= I'm So Glad You're You (And Not Me) =

Song by Motherlode
- A-side: "I'm So Glad You're You (And Not Me)"
- B-side: "Whipoorwill"
- Written: "William Smith, Phyllis Gorman
- Released: 1970
- Label: Revolver REVS 008
- Producer: Mort Ross

Motherlode singles chronology
"Dear Old Daddy Bill" (1970)	"I'm So Glad You're You (And Not Me)" (1970)	"All That's Necessary" (1971)

I'm So Glad You're You (And Not Me) was the fourth single for Canadian group Motherlode. It got to #33 in the Top 50 MAPL Canadian chart, staying around for about six weeks.

== Background ==
Motherlode had a huge hit the previous year with "When I Die". They followed up with "Memories of a Broken Promise" also in 1969 and "Dear Old Daddy Bill" in 1970.

The original line up broke up in December 1969. Their second album, Tapped Out which had already been recorded previously was released posthumously, but only in the United States. Original members Steve Kennedy, Ken Marco and Wayne Stone went on to be members of Dr. Music in Toronto, Ontario, Canada.

Due to Revolver Records having ownership of the Motherlode name, it decided to reform the group, keeping William Smith which made this line up the second version of the group. This new line up of Smith and three new musicians consisted of Smith on keyboards and vocals, Doug Richardson on saxophone, Anthony Shinault on guitar and Philip Wilson on drums.

It was reported by Billboard in its July 18, 1970 issue that their new single, "I'm So Glad You're You (And Not Me)" bw "Whipoorwill" which was produced by Mort Ross was scheduled for immediate release, with the Canadian release to be on Revolver and the United States release to be on Buddha. Released on Revolver REVS-008, the A side was composed by William Smith and Phyllis Gorman. The B side was composed by Anthony Shinault.

== Charts ==
For the week ending September 13, 1970, the single entered the Top 50 MAPL Canadian chart at No. 50. It reached its highest position at #33 on October 17, 1970 and held it for another week. By the 31st of that month, RPM Weekly had changed the chart to the Top 30 Canadian MAPL Chart, making it drop off the chart. It was now out of the chart and in the Recommended Canadian Singles list.
