= Dear Old Daddy Bill =

1969 single by Motherlode

Single by Motherlode

from the album When I Die
- B-side: "Living Life"
- Released: 1969
- Recorded: 1969
- Genre: Soul
- Label: Revolver REVS-005
- Songwriters: S. Kennedy, W. Smith, K. Marco
- Producer: Mort Ross

Motherlode singles chronology
"Memories of a Broken Promise" (1969)	"Dear Old Daddy Bill" (1969)	"I'm So Glad You're You And Not Me" (1970)

"Dear Old Daddy Bill" was the third and final charting single for Canadian band Motherlode. Not having the success of the two previous releases, it was only a minor hit for the group.

== Background ==
"Dear Old Daddy Bill" bw " Living Life" was released in Canada on Revolver REVS-005. It was written by Steve Kennedy, William "Smitty" Smith Smith and Kenny Marco. With the new distribution deal between Revolution Records and Compo Company, the single was released by early May, 1970.

== Chart performance ==
In June 1970, the single reached number 10 on the Top 50 MAPL chart. It peaked at number 20 on the RPM Top 50 Canadian Content chart. It peaked at #69 on the RPM100 chart.
