= Life (Canadian band) =

Canadian rock group

- Origin: Canada
- Genres: Rock
- Years active: 1969–1970
- Label: Polydor Records
- Past members: Barry Albert; Jean Pierre Lauzon; Michael Ship; Marty Simon; Danny Zimmerman; Lorri Zimmerman

Life was a late 1960s to early 1970s Canadian musical group who had success with the top 20 hit, "Hands of the Clock". They also charted with a cover of the Beatles' "Strawberry Fields Forever".

== Background ==
Formed from the remnants of the popular mid-1960s Canadian group The Scene, who had a hit in 1967 on the RPM chart, Life was made up of Michael Ship (Keyboards, Vocals), Marty Simon (Drums, Keyboards, Vocals), Danny Zimmerman (Bass,) Jean Pierre Lauzon (Guitar), and Barry Albert (Guitar). Lorri Zimmerman (Vocals) was with the group for a period of time. They recorded several singles and released an album. Their best success was with "Hands of the Clock". They also had some charting success with "Strawberry Fields Forever".

Neil Sheppard was a composer. He had the idea for "Hands of the Clock" which came into being one night while at Montreal's Winston Churchill pub. Recorded by Life and released as their debut single, it did well for them and became a hit, getting to the #19 spot. They got second prize in the Best Beat category for the single.

At some stage Barry Albert who was dissatisfied with the way things were progressing, and having possible issues with a new guitarist, Jean Pierre Lauzon, left to join the group Tapestry.

== Career ==
The origins of Life go back to a group called The Scene who were a popular Montreal group. Made up of Michael Ship on keyboards, Truly Noland on guitar, Danny Zimmerman on bass, and Marty Simon on drums, they released a single "Scenes (from Another World)" bw "You're In A Bad Way" on BT Puppy 533. The song got to #14 on the RPM Chart on December 2, 1967. Producer, songwriter Neil Sheppard was looking for a group to record his songs. The group Life which more or less came out of The Scene's leftovers was chosen to record for him.

=== 1969 ===
"Hands of the Clock"

The group's debut single, "Hands of the Clock" bw "Ain't I Told You Before" was released on Polydor 540.009 in 1969. Both sides were written by Neil Sheppard.

By May 26, the single was in the Recommended Canadian Content section of RPM Weekly. It was also making progress in Montreal and Ontario. By June 9, it had entered the Canadian Content Chart at #9. It had also entered the RPM100 Chart at #100. The group made the front cover of the RPM Weekly, July 14 issue. Their single was also at its second week at #4 on the RPM Canadian Content Chart, and had moved up from #48 to #43 on the RPM100 Chart.

It was noted by Billboard in the August 2 issue that "Hands of the Clock" by Life, "Laughing" by The Guess Who, and "When I Die" by Motherlode were three Canadian produced singles that were either in the Billboard "Hot Hundred" or "Bubbling Under". Following a strong response to the single in the US, it was noted in September that it would be released in England on Polydor.

The song eventually got to #19 on Canada's RPM chart.

Further activities

In June, they appeared at the Montreal Forum which hosted the First Montreal Bi-Cultural Pop Festival which was headlined by Steppenwolf. Other acts to appear were Triangle and Robert Charlebois.

Life was booked to appear at the "Freak Out" festival. A 72-hour event that ran on the Labor Day period from August 29 to September 1, held at Rock Hill, 16 miles north of Orangeville. Other acts booked to appear were The Brass Union, Brutus, Lighthouse, Motherlode, The Guess Who, and Buckstone Hardware, among others.

By November 22, their song "Sweet Lovin'" was showing signs of being a national breakout. The following week on November 29, it was seeing action at CFNB Fredericton. A photo of the group was included on page 6. By December 6, it was seeing action at CFNB Radio, Atlantic, and Radio Mutuel. It was announced in the December 13 issue that the single had been released. They had recently headlined the CJMS Starovan Underground event, playing to a crowd of 9,000, at the Paul Sauvé Arena. Booked solidly to play in Montreal during December, their agency Donald K. Donald Productions had planned an Eastern Canada tour for them in January.

Before 1969 was out, Marty Simon had left Life, relocating to Los Angeles to work with a new group.

=== 1970 ===
A song from the group's album, "Strawberry Fields" was selected for release as a single. Polydor's ad chief, Allan Katz, and label chief Frank Gould saw potential in the song. They believed it could become a hit for Life. Running at over 4 minutes, the song was edited down to 3:28. Katz took the single to Diane Jefford, CJMS's librarian. She listened to the record and within a period of minutes, the song was being played on air. Roger Fox of G-Fox was impressed and Dave Marsden of CKGM referred to it as a "helluva thing". Katz was also arranging a huge tie-in promotion for its release. Backed with Come Into My Life", it was released on Polydor 2065 005. By April 25, it had entered the Canadian Content Chart at #36. It was noted by Billboard in the May 30 issue that according to Frank Gould, the single had been picked up by the Maple Leaf System.

The single "Needing You" bw "Lovin' Time" was released on Polydor 2065 017. In July, Billboard reported that it was making some headway for Polydor.

Break up

Having carried on without Marty Simon as After Life, the band broke up some time in 1970.

== Discography ==
Singles
| Release | Catalogue | Year | Notes |
|---|---|---|---|
| "Hands Of The Clock" / "Ain't I Told You Before" | Polydor 540.009 | 1969 | |
| "Sweet Lovin'" / "Desire" | Polydor 540.013 | 1969 | |
| "Strawberry Fields Forever" / "Come into Me" | Polydor 2065 005 | 1970 | |
| "Needing You" / "Lovin' Time" | Polydor 2065 017 | 1970 | |

Album
| Release | Catalogue | Year | Notes |
|---|---|---|---|
| Life | Polydor | 1970 | |
| Life | | 2016 | Japanese (unmarked) reissue, off master tapes with 2 bonus tracks |
