= The Regents (Canadian band) =

- Origin: Canada
- Genres: Pop music
- Years active: 1959 to 1966
- Label: Quality Records

The Regents were a Canadian group formed in 1959. They started out as a club band and then reformed as a recording band. They had a Top 20 hit with "Me and You".

== Background ==
The formation of the group came about as a result of Steve Kennedy talking to Peter Groschel in the late 1950s. Kennedy was working for Bache and Co., where part of his job involved answering phone calls from Peter Groschel who worked in the stock brokerage business. Groshel would call Kennedy at Bache and Co. when there were international buy-and-sell orders. During the course of talking to each other over a period of time, and discovering Kennedy played saxophone, a band was formed, and Kennedy came in. The line up consisted of Brian Massey on bass, Tommy Goodings on guitar, Kennedy on saxophone and Groschel on drums. Sometime later singer Kay Taylor came in to front the band.

At some stage, they were invited by a man called Al Steiner for their group, now called The Regents to be the house band for the Blue Note club. Drummer and founder Peter Groschel developed health problems that lasted for six months. As a result, he was replaced by drummer Bob Andrews. The Regents were working as a backing band, playing with artists such as The Righteous Brothers Jackie Wilson, Johnny Nash, Jimmy Reed, Conway Twitty, and Stevie Wonder. They also backed local musicians such as Eric Mercury, Grant Smith, David Clayton Thomas, Ronnie Hawkins, Robbie Robertson and Levon Helm.

Around 1963, The Regents broke up and a short time later was reformed as a recording band with a different line up. Kennedy hung around on the scene, and afterwards joined the replacement house band, The Silhouettes which was Doug Riley's band that included Dianne Brooks in the line up. The new line up of The Regents recorded four singles and an album. One of them “Me And You” became a Canadian Top 20 hit.

== Career ==
After the early club house band line up of the Regents broke up, a new line up emerged. This consisted of Judi Jansen and Duncan White on vocals, Bob Andrews on trumpet, Russ Strathdee on saxophone, Brian White on organ, Jack Arseneault on guitar, Wayne Harmon on drums and Bruce Staubitz on bass. They recorded four singles and an album.

It was noted by Billboard in the March 6, 1965 issue that their single "Me and You" bw "Playmates" had been picked up by Red Bird Records in the United States. The single was given a 4 star rating by Billboard in their March 27, 1965 issue.

By May 1, 1965, "Me and You" was charting. It was at #3 in the Billboard Hits of the World, Canadian Records division of the Canadian chart, just behind "Walk that Walk" by David Clayton Thomas & Quintet. The following week both singles had maintained their positions. For the week ending May 3, 1965, the song had moved up from #5 to #3 on the R.P.M. play sheet. The single was released in the United States on the Blue Cat record label. Moving forward with the success of their single, Billboard noted it in the May 8, 1965 issue that Quality Records were releasing the album, Going Places with the Regents and that the hit single would be included. One of the first US radio stations to play the song was KYNO in Fresno. The station would later get an award from Quality records for breaking out "Shakin' All Over" by The Guess Who.

Also that year, the group had a full front-page article and photo in the May 3rd issue of RPM Weekly.

In 1966, they became a road band, performing as Dunc And Judi And The Regents.

== Later years ==
Judi Jansen would become part of the group Tapestry with Jack Winters and Heather Woodburn.

Jansen aka Judith Harmon died on Friday, June 7, 2019, at age 76.

== Discography Canada ==
Canadian singles
Act	Release	Catalogue	Year	Notes #
The Regents	"Night Train From Tunisia" / "Dance Of The Ookpiks"	Quality 1674X	1964	
The Regents	"Me and You" / "Playmates"	Quality 1709X	1965	#3 in Canada
The Regents	"Close To Me" / "I'm Moving Out Babe"	Quality 1734X	1965	
The Regents	"Space Walk" / "Blast Off"	Quality 1747X	1965	

Canadian albums
Act	Release	Catalogue	Year	Notes #
The Regents	Going Places with the Regents	Quality V 1757C	1965	
