= The Soul Searchers (Canadian group) =

Canadian soul music group

- Also known as: Diane Brooks, Eric Mercury and the Soul Searchers, Diane Brooks and the Soul Searchers, Eric Mercury and the Soul Searchers
- Origin: Toronto, Canada
- Genres: Soul, R&B
- Years active: 1966 to 196?
- Labels: Sac, Big Man Records, Mad Meece Records
- Past members: Diane Brooks; Eric "Mouse" Johnson; Steve Kennedy; Terry Logan; Glen McDonnell; Eric Mercury; William "Smitty" Smith

The Soul Searchers were an important part of Canadian soul music history. The group contained notable artists such as Diane Brooks, Eric Mercury, William "Smitty" Smith, Steve Kennedy and Eric "Mouse" Johnson. At times they are also referred to Diane Brooks, Eric Mercury and The Soul Searchers or Eric Mercury and the Soul Searchers.

== Background ==
They were a jazzy R&B ensemble which moved up from the teen clubs to licensed bars in Toronto. Playing at many of the clubs around Ontario and Québec and over the US border to venues in Buffalo, they also performed at The Scene club in New York. They also appeared multiple times on Canadian television on the Music Hop television show.

Singer Brenda Russell, who opened for the group, said they were the "most stunning things" she'd ever seen and that the group was the biggest soul band in the country and "there was nobody like them".

Two members of the group, Steve Kennedy and William Smith, were later founding members of the group Motherlode.

== Career ==
Diane Brooks had been a member of The Three Playmates, who had a hit in 1958 with "Sugah Wooga". Brooks and Steve Kennedy had been part of the Silhouettes, who were an established group on the Toronto R&B scene. The Silhouettes had backed Eric Mercury on his single "I Wondered Why" b/w "Softly", released on Clip 1122 in 1966. That year the two of them left the group to form The Soul Searchers with Eric Mercury, guitarist Terry Logan, organist William "Smitty" Smith and drummer Eric "Mouse" Johnson.

In his book A Stroke of Luck, William "Smitty" Smith wrote that Brooks and Kennedy were romantically involved. He and Kennedy had an idea of putting together a group to play behind her. So in 1966 the group was formed. Even though the group is referred to as the Soul Searchers, the real name was Diane Brooks, Eric Mercury and the Soul Searchers. The group included Eric "Mouse" Johnson on drums and vocals, Steve Kennedy on tenor, baritone sax and background vocals, Terry Logan on guitar and vocals, and William "Smitty" Smith on Hammond B3 organ and vocals. Their first gig was at the Memory Lane in Toronto.

With things moving along for the group, Brooks got an offer to record for herself. Due to the band supposedly not being up to the task and lacking in experience, they did not get to play on the recording. A session took place in New York in 1966. According to Michel Ruppli's book on the Verve discography, on November 17 of that year, four songs were recorded with Harvey Brooks (no relation to Diane), who was producing at the time. The four songs on that date were "I Just Don't Know What To Do With Myself" / "In My Heart" (Verve 5036), and "Sometimes I Wonder" and "Into Something Good". The following year, on March 15, two more tracks were recorded, "Picture Me Gone" (Verve 5055) and "Say Something Nice To Me". Some of these tracks were not released. Diane Brooks did have "Picture Me Gone" b/w "Sometimes I Wonder" released on Verve Forecast KF 5055 in 1967. The B-side was composed by herself and Kennedy. In mid-1967, members of the group provided vocal backing for Mandala on their Soul Crusade album that was released on Atlantic Records. Also in that period, along with The Free Spirits and Tiny Tim, the group appeared at The Scene on the same bill as The Doors on various nights in May and June.

At some stage Brooks had left the band after falling in love with a hairdresser, leaving Mercury to be the front man.

=== Lonely Girl ===
In spite of the group having played gigs in Canada and the US, they still had not secured a record deal. They did, however, get the attention of a young producer called C. Nash. He had been coming to their performances and wanted to record them. They had been playing in Detroit at the time when a session was set up around the middle of the night in a small spartan studio. After a few hours of rehearsal and arrangement, the recording session took place. The song "Lonely Girl", which was written by William "Mickey" Stevenson and Ivy Jo Hunter, had been rejected by Motown. Later, ten copies of the record were given to the group. They never saw Nash again and had no airplay or promotion. The single credited to Eric Mercury & The Soul Searchers would eventually become highly prized among collectors, attracting some high prices. By mid-1968, the Soul Searchers were a popular band in Canada with Mercury as the front man. It was when they were playing in Halifax that he decided to leave the band.

=== Breaking up ===
One thing that pushed Eric Mercury out was when the group played a gig at The Mercury Club on Victoria street without him. The killing of Dr. Martin Luther King Jr. and hearing what Richie Havens was doing musically were other things that prompted him to leave. So he headed to New York with just his library card and $52.

Steve Kennedy left the band and was replaced by saxophonist Glen McDonnell. Some time later, following the break-up of the group, William Smith followed Kennedy and joined Grant Smith & The Power, of which David Clayton Thomas was a member. Then in 1969, Smith and Kennedy formed Motherlode.

== Later years ==
Eric "Mouse" Johnson would be a member of Rhinoceros and their drummer for the group's final months in 1971. He was also a member of Dr. Music and later played on albums by David Clayton-Thomas, Eric Mercury, Diane Brooks and Leon Hayward etc.

After Motherlode, William Smith worked with Etta James, David Foster, Richie Havens and Crosby, Stills and Nash in the 1970s and in the 1980s, more session work with artists such as Tracy Chapman, Linda Ronstadt, Maurice White, Jackson Browne, Bruce Willis, Rod Stewart, Tina Turner and The Pointer Sisters. He also recorded two solo albums, A Good Feelin and Smitty. On New Year's Day 1992, he suffered a stroke and on November 26, 1997, he died of a heart attack in Sherman Oaks.

Diane Brooks had a solo career and recorded two albums, Some Kind of Soul and The Backstairs of My Life. She also recorded an album with Bob Ruzicka in 1974 that was for CBC radio use only. She also was a backing singer and toured with Bette Midler, Boz Scaggs, and Count Basie. She died from pulmonary disease in 2005 at age 66.

Eric Mercury went on to record Electric Black Man, which was released in 1969. He had a hit in 1971 with "I Can Smell That Funky Music", which got to no. 30 on the Canadian charts. With William "Smitty" Smith, he co-wrote "Down the Backstairs of My Life", which would be recorded by himself, Smith, Dianne Brooks, Yvonne Elliman, Leah Kunkel, Thelma Houston, Kenny Rankin, Joey Scarbury and Dee Dee Warwick. He also had a minor hit in 1983 with "Our Love Will Stop the World", which he sang as a duet with Roberta Flack. He died from pancreatic cancer on 14 March 2022.

== Discography ==
Recordings
Act	Song title	Catalogue info	Year	Notes #
Eric Mercury And The Soul Searchers	"Lonely Girl" / "Lonely Girl" Part 2	Sac 5-0001	196?	US original release
Eric Mercury And The Soul Searchers	"Lonely Girl" / "Lonely Girl" Part 2	Sac 5-0001	2020	US Re-release
Eric Mercury And The Soul Searchers	"Lonely Girl" / "Lonely Girl" Part 2	Big Man Records BMR - 1006	2021	UK release ( Re-release)

Album
Act	Song title	Catalogue info	Year	Notes #
The Soul Searchers	Live at Strawberry Patch	Mad Meece Records	1968	
