= Walkin' on My Mind =

1969 single by Dianne Brooks

Single by Dianne Brooks

from the album Some Other Kind Of Soul
- B-side: "Need To Belong"
- Released: 1969
- Genre: Soul
- Length: 3:06
- Label: Revolver REVS-001
- Songwriter(s): Doug Riley
- Producer(s): Mort Ross

Dianne Brooks singles chronology
"Picture me Gone" (1967)	"Walkin' on My Mind" (1969)	"Show Him (He's Not Alone)" (1969)

"Walkin' on My Mind" is a hit for soul singer Dianne Brooks. Released in 1969, it was the first single released by Revolver Records. It was also Brooks' first release on a Canadian owned label. It is also an example of how the quality of a song can activate a record label.

== Background ==
"Walkin' on My Mind" bw "Need to Belong" was a Mort Ross production. It was released in February, 1969 on the Revolution Records' subsidiary, Revolver. It was also released as "Walking On My Mind" in the United States on Ray Charles' Tangerine label, cat no. TRC 993.

The song started off in 1969 as one of two demos at a newly built recording studio that was set to open for business later that year in August. It wasn't the intention of the studio owners to start off with a record company. Mort Ross, Doug Riley and their engineer, Englishman, Terry Brown wanted to build a studio with recording facilities superior to what was in Canada at the time. However Dianne Brooks' vocal work on the two Doug Riley compositions changed things. The songs were deemed to be too good to remain unreleased. As a result of this Revolver Records came into being.

== Distribution ==
For Canadian distribution in Canada, the Compo Company was chosen. Revolution's chief, Mort Ross had travelled to New York to set up the distribution deal with Ray Charles' Tangerine label for the current record. The deal also involved any future releases from Brooks. For English distribution Morgan Records was chosen.

The record was released in New Zealand on the Viking record label.

== Chart performance ==
By April 21, 1969, the song had entered the RPM Weekly Canadian Content Chart at #10. By May 2, it reached #4 on the RPM chart. It got to #67 nationally.

== Releases ==
Releases
Title	Catalogue	Year	Country	Notes #
"Walkin' on My Mind" / "Need to Belong"	Revolver REVS 001	1969	Canada	
"Walking On My Mind" / "Need to Belong"	Tangerine Records TRC 993	1969	United States	
"Walkin' On My Mind" / "Need to Belong"	Revolver REVS 001	1969	United Kingdom	
"Walkin' on My Mind" / "Need to Belong"	Pink Elephant PE 22.013	1969	Netherlands	
"Walkin' on My Mind" / "Need to Belong"	Viking VS.240	1969	New Zealand	
