= David Soul (album) =

- Cover of original 1976 release

Studio album by David Soul
- Released: January 14, 1976
- Recorded: June–October 1975
- Studio: His Masters Wheels (San Francisco)
- Genre: Pop rock; soft rock
- Label: Private Stock
- Producer: Elliot Mazer

David Soul chronology
David Soul (1976)	Playing to an Audience of One (1977)

David Soul is the debut album by American actor and singer-songwriter David Soul, released in 1976.

On later editions of the album, Soul's hit single "Don't Give Up on Us" was featured in place of "One More Mountain to Climb".

== Track listing ==
Side one
No.	Title	Writer(s)	Length
1.	"The Wall"	David Soul, Gardner McKay	1:50
2.	"1927 Kansas City"	Mike Reilly	3:05
3.	"Bird on a Wire" (Leonard Cohen cover)	Leonard Cohen	2:57
4.	"Hooray for Hollywood"	David MacKenzie	2:35
5.	"Landlord"	Jim Page	3:05
6.	"Seem to Miss So Much (Coalminer's Song)"	Bruno Kirby, Sam Fox	3:46

Side two
No.	Title	Writer(s)	Length
7.	"One More Mountain to Climb" (Dr. Music cover)	Neil Sedaka, Howard Greenfield	3:02
8.	"Ex Lover"	Amanda McBroom	4:18
9.	"Topanga"	David Soul, Gardner McKay	4:06
10.	"Black Bean Soup" (Duet with Lynne Marta)	David Soul, Gardner McKay	2:33
11.	"Kristofer David"	David Soul	4:16

== Musicians ==
- Norton Buffalo - harmonica
- John Doukas - backing vocals
- Greg Errico - percussion
- Richard Greene - fiddle
- Hawkins: Feddy, Lynette, Tremaine, Walter Hawkins - backing vocals
- Tom Hensley - keyboards
- Jimmy Hodder - drums
- Nicky Hopkins - piano
- Hutch - backing vocals
- Teddy Irwin - Guitar
- Andy Kulberg - bass, strings arranger
- Taj Mahal - mandolin, acoustic bass
- Gary Mallaber - percussion
- Lynne Marta - backing vocals
- Elliot Mazer - bass
- Chris Mickie - guitar
- Jac Murphy - piano
- The Nob Hill Gang - horns
- The Persuasions - backing vocals
- Merl Saunders - piano
- Smiggy - electric guitar
- David Soul - acoustic guitar
- Hoshal Wright - acoustic guitar, banjo

== Charts ==
=== Weekly charts ===
Chart (1976/77)	Peak position
Australian Albums (Kent Music Report)	8
Dutch Albums (Album Top 100)	17
New Zealand Albums (RMNZ)	13
UK Albums (OCC)	2

=== Year-end charts ===
Chart (1977)	Position
UK Albums (OCC)	37
