= Marty Simon =

Canadian entrepreneur, composer, and musician

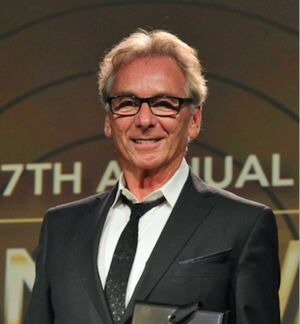
- Born: Montreal, Quebec, Canada
- Education: McGill University
- Occupations: Composer, music director, entrepreneur

Marty Simon is a Canadian drummer, composer and music director. In the 1970s, Simon was part of Mylon LeFevre's Holy Smoke Band and later formed the rock band Sharks in London with Andy Fraser and Chris Spedding. His songwriting credits include works with Celine Dion, Wilson Pickett, and Rick Ross. Simon has collaborated with artists such as Brian Eno, Leslie West, and Serge Gainsbourg. As a film and TV composer, he is best known for scoring the sci-fi TV series Lexx (1996–2002), contributing to 65 episodes.

== Early life and education ==
Simon was born in Montreal, Quebec, to Arthur and Miriam Simon, who were originally from Winnipeg. His musical talent emerged at age 5 when he played the piano by ear.

In the mid-1960s, Simon played in local bands influenced by The Beatles. He attended Concordia University (then Sir George Williams University) in 1966, where he met drummer Corky Laing. Simon's first studio experience came in 1967 with his band The Scene, which recorded "Scenes (From Another World)" for B.T. Puppy Records. In 1968, after dropping out of Concordia University, Simon studied piano and percussion at McGill University's Faculty of Music. In 1969, he formed the band LIFE, which gained regional success with the hit Hands of the Clock for Polydor Records.

== Career ==
In the 1970s, Simon had a progressive music career, starting with his involvement in New York City with Mountain's management firm and joining Mylon LeFevre's "Holy Smoke" band in Atlanta. He toured with Mylon and opened for bands like The Who, Ten Years After, and Traffic. Simon contributed to projects such as Mylon's albums Holy Smoke and Over the Influence. He later formed Sharks in London with Andy Fraser, recording albums and touring Europe, and worked with several artists there, including Brian Eno on Here Come the Warm Jets.

Simon continued collaborating with artists, including The Leslie West Band, Michel Pagliaro, and Wilson Pickett. He co-wrote the disco hit "(Everybody) Get Dancin'" by The Bombers in the late 1970s.

He is the founder of MRD-Music Revenue Data Inc., a global royalty management service, and Powerscore Music, a tech-reporting subsidiary.

== Discography (selected) ==
- Scenes From Another World (1967) – The Scene
- Hand of the Clock (1969) – LIFE
- Mylon with Holy Smoke (1971) – Mylon LeFevre
- Mylon: Under the Influence (1972) – Mylon LeFevre
- First Water (1973) – Sharks
- Jab It In Yore Eye (1974) – Sharks
- Here Come the Warm Jets (1974) - Brian Eno
- I Want You (1979) - Wilson Pickett
- Walking Through Fire(1985) – April Wine
- Des mots qui sonnent (1991) – Celine Dion
- Tales From A Parallel Universe (1997) - Marty Simon / LEXX
- God Forgives, I Don't (2012) - Rick Ross

== Filmography (selected) ==
- And Then You Die (1987)
- The Squamish Five (1988)
- Eddie and the Cruisers II: Eddie Lives!! (1989)
- Scanners II The New Order (1991)
- Lexx (1997)
