= Dianne Brooks =

American jazz musician (1939–2005)

- Also known as: Gwen Brooks, Diane Brooks
- Born: Gwendolyn Dianne Brooks; January 3, 1939; New Jersey, U.S.
- Died: April 29, 2005 (aged 66) Toronto, Ontario, Canada
- Genres: Soul, jazz
- Occupation: Singer
- Instrument: Vocals
- Labels: Verve, Revolver, Reprise
- Formerly of: The Three Playmates, The Silhouettes, The Soul Searchers

Gwendolyn Dianne Brooks (January 3, 1939 – April 29, 2005) was an American soul, R&B and jazz singer. With the Three Playmates, Brooks recorded several songs in 1957. She moved to Toronto shortly thereafter. Her part in Canadian soul music history began when the group Diane Brooks, Eric Mercury and the Soul Searchers was formed. As a solo singer, she recorded two albums and several singles. Her biggest solo hit was "Walkin' on My Mind" in 1969. She was also a prolific session singer. As a vocalist, she provided backing vocals on albums by a multitude of artists that include Anne Murray, Gino Vannelli and Richie Havens. She was also a songwriter.

== Background ==
Brooks was born in New Jersey and grew up there singing gospel music. Things started for her at three years of age when she was singing in her New Jersey church. Taking note of Dianne's talent, her mother eventually sent her to New York City to study voice. Brooks was a teenager when she joined the group The Three Playmates, who recorded for the Savoy label. In 1960, she moved to Toronto. During the 1960s, she was a member of two popular Canadian R&B / soul groups. She also appeared regularly on Canadian radio and television. Along the way, she caught the attention of Jerry Schoenbaum, who founded the Verve Records label. She was offered a deal and recorded two singles for the label. One of the songs she recorded, "Picture Me Gone", was recorded by Madeline Bell, who was also from New Jersey and like Brooks grew up singing gospel. Like Bell, she had a similar career, adding her backing vocals to recordings by a multitude of artists. During the 1970s, she had a lot of work as an in-demand backing vocalist.

Commenting on Brooks, Emmylou Harris once said, “I know I'm a valid singer, but when I hear Dianne I feel like handing in my contract.”. Ray Charles referred to her as the greatest voice he'd heard since Dinah Washington. Jack Batten of The Toronto Star once called her the best soul singer in the country. Anne Murray said that she had never met someone as innovative vocally as Brooks.

== Early career ==
=== 1950s ===
With the Three Playmates

In the late 1950s, she was involved in the following recordings:

- "Giddy-Up-a-Ding-Dong" / "It Must Be Love" (released on Savoy 45-1523 in 1957),
- "Give Your Love to Me" / "(Do-oo, Do-oo) I Dreamed" (released on Savoy 45-1528 in 1957) with backing by musicians George Barrow, Jerome Richardson, Budd Johnson, Sam Price, Kenny Burrell, Joe Benjamin, Bobby Donaldson, and Ernie Wilkins (arranger)
- "Sugah Wooga" / "Lovey Dovey Pair" (released on Savoy 45-1528 in 1957) with backing by musicians Buddy Lucas, Bobby Banks, and Leonard Gaskin.

The Three Playmates was made up of sisters Lucille and Alma Beatty and Gwen Brooks (Dianne). They had a chart hit with one of their records on the Savoy label. The song "Sugah Wooga", which she co-wrote with Ozzie Cadena, got to #89 on the Billboard Pop Top 100.

=== 1960s ===
The Orbiteers In 1962, she was featured on a recording relating to the Orbiteer toy. The song was "The Orbiteer Twist", which was a commercial. It was also her own composition. The A-side of the single was credited to Dianne Brooks with Billy O'Conner and His Orbiteersmen. The B-side, "My Orbiteer Will Come Back", a Randy Leeds composition, was credited to The Orbiteers with Billy O'Conner and His Orbiteersmen. It was allegedly the first time Robbie Robertson played on a released recording.

The Silhouettes Brooks and saxophonist Steve Kennedy had been part of The Silhouettes who were an established group on the Toronto R&R scene. The Silhouettes had backed Eric Mercury on his single, "I Wondered Why" / "Softly", released on Clip 1122 in 1966. The group also backed and included Jack Hardin. They played at venues such as Toronto's music clubs Friar's Tavern and the Blue Note.

With the Soul Searchers Also in 1966, Brooks and Kennedy left the group to form The Soul Searchers with Eric Mercury, guitarist Terry Logan, organist William "Smitty" Smith and drummer Eric "Mouse" Johnson. According to Smitty's book A Stroke of Luck, Brooks and Kennedy were in a romantic relationship. Smith and Kennedy had an idea of putting together a group to play behind Brooks. Things began in April that year. Even though the group is referred to as the Soul Searchers, the real name was Diane Brooks, Eric Mercury and The Soul Searchers. The group included Eric "Mouse" Johnson on drums and vocals, Steve Kennedy on tenor, baritone sax and background vocals, Terry Logan on guitar and vocals and William "Smitty" Smith on Hammond B3 organ and vocals. They first played at the Memory Lane in Toronto.

Sometime that year, Brooks got an offer to record for herself. Due to the band supposedly not having the experience or considered to be up to the task, they didn't get to play on the recording. According to Michel Ruppli's book on the Verve discography, a recording session took place in New York on November 17 of that year. Four songs were recorded with Harvey Brooks (no relation to Diane), who was producing at the time. They were "I Just Don't Know What To Do With Myself", "In My Heart", "Sometimes I Wonder" and "Into Something Good". The following year on March 15, two more tracks, "Picture Me Gone" and "Say Something Nice To Me", were recorded. It's possible that some of these tracks did not see a release. "In My Heart" b/w "I Just Don't Know What To Do With Myself" was released on Verve Folkways 5036 around November 1966 while "Picture Me Gone" b/w "Sometimes I Wonder" was supposed to be released on Verve Forecast 5055 in 1967.

In May and June 1967 the group appeared in New York at The Scene club with The Free Spirits and Tiny Tim. The Soul Searchers were on the same bill as The Doors on various nights, with the poster saying "APPEARING WITH THE DOORS NIGHTLY for a Completely Flipped Out Evening: DIANNE BROOKS / ERIC MERCURY and The SOUL SEARCHERS".

At some stage Brooks had left the band after falling in love with a hairdresser, leaving Mercury to be the front man.

== Solo career ==
=== Revolution Records period ===
Revolution Records was run by Mort Ross and Doug Riley with Terry Brown as their recording engineer. The intention of Revolution Records wasn't to start as a record company as they did. They wanted to build a recording facility with equipment superior to what other Canadian studios had at the time. But with the studio having been built and ready for business later in August 1969, they recorded some demos with Brooks in the meantime. They were originally intended to be just demos. The studio owners were very impressed with what they heard, and considered them to be "So good they had to be released". This is how Revolver Records came into being when it did.

By March 1969, she was signed to Revolution. Also that month, her single "Walkin' on My Mind" had been released by Revolution's subsidiary, Revolver Records. It was also being released in the United States on Ray Charles' Tangerine label. Revolution's Mort Ross had travelled to New York to set up the distribution deal with Charles' label for the current record, which also involved any future releases from Brooks. A distribution deal was also set up for England with Morgan Records handling that task. For Canadian distribution, the Compo Company was chosen. By April 21 the song had entered the RPM Weekly Canadian Content Chart at #10. By May 2 it made it to #4 on the RPM chart. However, it only got to #67 nationally.

The group Motherlode was doing gigs on Friday and Saturday nights in London, Ontario. They did a demo session with Brooks as a backing vocalist. However, it was decided that she wasn't needed. Also around that period, Motherlode came up with their When I Die album.

In late September 1969, her second single with Revolution, "Show Him (He's Not Alone)", which was written by Doug Riley, was released on Revolver REVS 003. The single, which was backed with "Show Me", was produced by Mort Ross. She also had written a song, "Memories of a Broken Promise", which Motherlode had recorded and released as the follow-up to their hit "When I Die". By the end of November the song was charting in both Canada and the US. The song would get to #99 on the Cash Box Top 100 Singles chart. By November 22, the song was at #4 on the RPM Canadian Content Chart and at #55 on the Canadian National chart. It would eventually be one of the BMI Canada Certificate of Honour winners of 1969.

An article in the November 29 issue of RPM indicated that her album was soon due to make its appearance. Motherlode did some instrumental backing on her Some Other Kind of Soul album. William Smith and Steve Kennedy also wrote "The Boys Are On the Case".

Her other activities during 1969 until the end of the year involved performing with Doug Riley at Friar's Cub and then appearing at the Savarin Tavern with Rob McConnell's Boss Brass.

By June 27, 1970, Some Other Kind of Soul was at #87 on the RPM100 album chart.

=== 1970s ===
Along with Emmylou Harris and Anne Murray, she provided backing vocals to Canadian folk singer Bob Carpenter's album Silent Passage, which was released in 1975. In 1976, her Back Stairs Of My Life album was released. It also included the song "Down the Backstairs of My Life". It was written by Eric Mercury and William Smith. Smith was also one of the backing musicians, playing keyboards. The album also included the songs "Kinky Love" and "Brown Skin Rose". They were released on a single with "Kinky Love" as the A-side. The single got into the Canadian Top 40. It also got some airplay in the US. Also in 1976, she and William Smith provided background vocals to the music on Richie Havens' The End of the Beginning album. Sharing background vocal duties with Pattie Brooks and Brenda Russell, she was one of the handpicked singers to sing on Dusty Springfield's tenth studio album, It Begins Again, which was released in 1978.

=== 1980s ===
According to the Cash Box article dated April 18, 1981, her single was one of the new releases on the Town House record label, which was formed by Las Vegas-based real estate developer William Levitt. The single, "Go Away" b/w "Drums", was produced by Nat Kipner.

=== 1990s to 2000s ===
On October 1, 1996, the Toronto Blues Society announced that she was to share the stage in November that year with artists that included Blues Talent Search winner Robin Banks, rock diva Lee Aaron, Chris Armstrong, Juno nominee Georgette Fry, Melanie Jean, Andrea Koziol, and Jani Lauzon.

== Death and legacy ==
Brooks died in Toronto on April 29, 2005, at age 66, from chronic obstructive pulmonary disease.

Brooks' daughter Jo-Ann a.k.a. JoAnne Brooks VanderMeer died from health complications on March 7, 2019, at age 65. She was also a singer. Her daughter Lindsay Bell is also a singer.

== Posthumous releases ==
In 2021, an album of eight songs, From the Heart & Soul, was released by Panda Digital. Musicians playing on the album included Don Grusin and Jack Lee on keyboards and piano, Doug Riley on piano, Al Ciner, Chris Corrigan and Rob Walsh on guitar, and Paul Stallworth on bass. The drummers were Joe Carrero, Claudio Slon and Bob McLaren. The songs on the album were "Trying to Get to You", "Give Me One More Chance", "I'm Carrying", "Can't Get Enough of You", "All I Need is You", "Out Love is Here to Stay", "Venice Breeze" and "But Not for Me". The first five tracks on the album are from two L. A. sessions, one in 1978 and the other in 1980. The other three tracks were recorded with the Doug Riley Trio, live at George's Spaghetti House in 1983. A track of special note was "All I Need Is You". The Jazz Week chart showed plays from September 13, 2021, to January 10, 2022, with the last recorded position of 283. Even though brief, the review by George W. Harris of Jazz Weekly was good, with the reviewer saying she floated over the bassline of "Trying To Get To You" and slinked on the slow cover of "I'm Carrying", a Paul McCartney song.

== Discography ==
Singles With the Three Playmates
Act	Release	Catalogue	Year	Notes #
The Playmates (Gwen, Lucille, Alma)	"It Must Be Love" / "Giddy-Up-A-Ding-Dong"	Savoy 45-1523	1957	
The Three Playmates	"Sugah Wooga" / "Lovey Dovey Pair"	Savoy 45-1528	1957/1958?	
The Three Playmates	"Give Your Love to Me" / "(Do-oo, Do-oo) I Dreamed"	Savoy 45-1537	1957/1958?	

Solo singles Canada
Act	Release	Catalogue	Year	Notes #
Dianne Brooks	"The Orbiteer Twist" / "My Orbiteer Will Come Back"	RCA Victor 57-3292	1962	Side 2 The Orbiteers
Dianne Brooks	"In My Heart" / "I Just Don't Know What to Do with Myself"	Verve Folkways KF-5036	1966 or 1967	
Dianne Brooks	"Walkin' on My Mind" / "Need To Belong"	Revolver REVS 001	1969	
Dianne Brooks	"Show Him (He's Not Alone)" / "Show Me"	Revolver REVS-003	1969	
Dianne Brooks	"Kinky Love" / "Brown Skin Rose"	Reprise Records RPS 1366	1976	

Solo singles USA
Act	Release	Catalogue	Year	Notes #
Dianne Brooks	"In My Heart" / "I Just Don't Know What to Do with Myself"	Verve Folkways KF 5036	1967	
Diane Brooks	"Picture Me Gone" / "Sometimes I Wonder"	Verve Forecast KF 5055	1969	
Dianne Brooks	"Walking on My Mind" / " Need To Belong"	Tangerine TRC 993	1969	Released in Canada on Revolver REVS 001
Dianne Brooks	"Kinky Love" / "Brown Skin Rose"	Reprise Records RPS 1366	1976	
Dianne Brooks	"Go Away" / "Drums"	Town House 1051	1981	

USA Albums unless specified otherwise
Act	Song title	Release info	Year	Notes #
Dianne Brooks	Some Other Kind of Soul	Revolver RLPS 503	1970	with Lenny Breau
Bob Ruzicka / Dianne Brooks	Bob Ruzicka Dianne Brooks	Radio Canada International LM 404	1974	Canada release Also released on CBC Radio Canada LM 404
Dianne Brooks	Back Stairs of My Life	Reprise MS 2244	1977	
Dianne Brooks	From the Heart & Soul	Panda Digital	2021	Digital
