= Leigh Ashford =

Canadian rock band

- Origin: Canada
- Genres: Rock
- Years active: 1960s–1970s
- Labels: Nimbus, Revolver

Leigh Ashford was a Canadian rock group formed in Toronto, Ontario, Canada, and which existed between 1966 and 1974. Many of the band members would go on to form Moxy in 1973.

== Background ==
The group was formed in 1967 by, the guitarist Gord Waszek, drummer and singer Dave Cairns, bassist Joe Agnello and keyboard player Newton Garwood.

== History ==
With Newton Garwood as keyboardist, the band opened for The Vanilla Fudge. Later on in 1969 a lead singer was added for more dynamics. Percussionist Vocalist Glenn Brown was recruited from another iconic Toronto band, A Passing Fancy. During his stint in the band, Leigh Ashford opened for the bands The Foundations at the Electric Circus in Toronto and The Who at the Rockpile in 1969. Record producer Jack Richardson took the band to New York to record. A single "Country Place" was released on the Nimbus 9 label, but the album itself was never issued.

The band kept busy in the clubs in Toronto until 1970. Garwood was replaced by keyboardist Bruno Weckerle, Craig Kaleal (of The Witness) became the permanent drummer and a new vocalist Buzz Shearman was added. The band was invited to appear at three day long, Strawberry Fields Festival, in August 1970. In 1971, they recorded their debut album called Kinfolk in the RCA studios in Toronto. Things were looking good for the band with a US tour. In addition, the album's first single, "Dickens", began gaining attention of US radio stations. However creative differences due to member turn-over rate was breaking the band up. It fell to singer Buzz Shearman to pick up the pieces and soldier on in 1972, when founding members Gord Waszek joining Fludd and Joe Agnello joining Grant Smith & The Power. Wally Cameron and Doni Underhill also decided to leave in 1974, with Underhill also joining Fludd. Shearman recruited Earl Johnson (guitar, and former member of the King Biscuit Boy band), Kim Fraser, then Terry Juric (bass guitar) and Bill Wade (drums), the latter being former members of Outlaw Music. This group ultimately evolved with a harder sound into the hit recording act Moxy in late 1974.

In 1997, Pacemaker Records re-issued the sole Leigh Ashford album, Kinfolk, on CD.

== Career ==
In December 1970, the group had their single out on the Revolver label that was headed by Mort Ross. A distribution deal between Revolver and RCA had been signed. In addition to Leigh Ashford, other acts included Chimo!, Motherlode, and Jam Jar.

== Members ==
- Dave Cairns (drums, vocals)
- Joe Agnello (bass)
- Newton Garwood (keyboards)
- Gord Waszek (guitar)
- Glenn Brown (vocals)
- Wally Cameron (drums; replaced Cairns 1970)
- Lance Wright (drums; replaced Cameron)
- Craig Kaleal (drums; replaced Wright)
- Buzz Shearman (vocals; replaced Brown 1971)
- Bruno Weckerle (keyboards; replaced Garwood)
- Don Elliot (bass; replaced Agnello)
- Doni Underhill (bass; replaced Elliot)
- Kim Fraser (bass; replaced Underhill 1973)
- Earl Johnson (guitar; replaced Waszek 1973)
- Terry Juric (bass; replaced Fraser 1974)
- Bill Wade (drums; replaced Kaleal 1973)

== Discography ==
=== Singles ===
Canadian release
Act	Release	Catalogue	Year	Notes #
Leigh Ashford	"Country Place" / " Ev'rything Is Easy"	Nimbus 75-1026	1969/1970	(with David Cairns on vocals)
Leigh Ashford	"Dickens" / "Lee Oompa Kum Pah Pah"	Revolver 75-1040	1971	(with Buzz Shearman on vocals) (#27 Canada) REVS-0010
Leigh Ashford	"Never Give Myself" / "County Country"	Revolver 75-1054	1971	(with Buzz Shearman on vocals) REVS-0012
Leigh Ashford	"Never Give Myself" / "Good Day"	Revolver 74-0526	1971	(with Buzz Shearman on vocals)
Leigh Ashford	"The Country's Got a Soul All Its Own" / ""Workin' All Day"	Hopi PI 1001	1972	(with Buzz Shearman on vocals)

=== Albums ===
- Kinfolk - Revolver– LSP-4520, 1971
1. "Dickens" - 2:40 (Sherman, Waszek)
2. "Mighty Fine Cookin'" - 3:15 (Waszek)
3. "Never Give Myself" - 4:27 (Waszek)
4. "Juicy Lucy" - 3:25 (Waszek)
5. "County Country" - 3:24 (Sherman, Waszek)
6. "Good Day" - 4:00 (Agnelio, Kaleal, Shearman)
7. "Lee Oompa Kum Pah Pah" - 3:10 (Agnello, Shearman, Waszek)
8. "Lady" - 4:44 (Sherman, Waszek)
9. "Sicawine, Part 1" - 3:27 (Sherman, Waszek, Weckerle, Agnello)
10. "Sicawine, Part 2" - 6:39 (Sherman, Waszek, Weckerle, Agnello)
11. "Workin' All Day" - 2:05 (Sherman)- Bonus track on 1997 re-issue CD
12. "The Country's Got a Soul" - 3:14 (Sherman) - Bonus track on 1997 re-issue CD
