= Trudy Desmond =

- Born: 11 October 1945; U.S.
- Died: 19 February 1999 (aged 53); Toronto, Ontario, Canada
- Genres: Jazz
- Occupation: Singer
- Years active: 1980s–1990s

Trudy Desmond (October 11, 1945 – 19 February 1999) was a Canadian jazz singer.

== Career ==
After moving from New York to Toronto, she worked as an actress, interior designer, club manager, and theatrical producer. She was one of the 16 original members of the Dr. Music ensemble led by Doug Riley.

She performed in concert with the Don Thompson Quartet (Ed Bickert on guitar, bassist Paul Novotny, and drummer John Sumner) during the Sound of Toronto Jazz Series at the Ontario Science Centre on January 23, 1989.

== Discography ==
- Tailor Made (The Jazz Alliance, 1992)
- RSVP (Jazz Alliance, 1994)
- Make Me Rainbows (Koch, 1995)
- My One and Only (Justin Time, 1998)
