= The Scene (Canadian band) =

Canadian psychedelic rock band

- Also known as: Scene, Scenes
- Origin: Montreal, Canada
- Genres: Rock, psychedelic rock
- Years active: late 1960s
- Label: B.T. Puppy Records
- Spinoffs: Life
- Past members: Truly Noland; Michael Ship; Marty Simon; Danny Zimmerman

The Scene was a short-lived Canadian psychedelic rock band who had a top 20 hit in their country in 1967 with "Scenes (From Another World)". Some members of the group later ended up in another Canadian rock band, Life.

== Background ==
The Scene were a popular Montreal group. The line-up consisted of Michael Ship on keyboards, Truly Noland on guitar, Danny Zimmerman on bass and Marty Simon on drums. They released a single "Scenes (from Another World)" bw "You're In A Bad Way". The song got to #14 on the RPM Chart on December 2, 1967.

== Career ==
Neil Sheppard aka Neil Ship was in New York, where he met Hank Medress and The Tokens, who owned the B.T. Puppy label. He did some studio work for them. In late 1967, he helped his brother Michael Ship to get a one-off single deal for The Scene, which led to the group recording the psychedelic rock flavored "Scenes (from Another World)" bw "You're in a Bad Way".

Their single was released on B.T. Puppy in 1967. The October 28th issue of RPM Music Weekly confirmed its release. Referring to The Scene as "a top Montreal group", it was reported by Billboard in the October 21, 1967, issue that "Scenes From Another World" had made its international debut on the B.T. Puppy label. In December 1967, the single peaked at No. 13 on the RPM singles chart in Canada.

=== Break up ===
After the group broke up, producer and songwriter Neil Sheppard was looking for a group to record his songs. The group Life included three Scene members and was chosen to record for him. They had a hit with "Hands of the Clock".

== Discography ==
Singles
Act	Release	Catalogue	Year	Notes
The Scene	"Scenes (From Another World)" / "You're in a Bad Way"	B.T. Puppy 533	1967	

Appears on (selective)
Title	Track	Catalogue	Year	Notes
Night Time Music: The B.T. Puppy Story (Rev-Ola Phantom Jukebox Vol. II)	"Scenes (From Another World)"	Rev-Ola – CR REV 38; Phantom Jukebox Series Vol. II	2003	CD; UK release
Psychedelia Volume Four	"Scenes (From Another World)"	Tiny Alice Records TA 004	(C)1994	LP; UK, unofficial Release
Gear! 2	"You're In A Bad Way"	Newbottle – 016	2007	Credited as Scene; CDr, Unofficial release UK release
Psychedelia A Herbal Mixture Of Psychedelic Remedies And Freakbeat Fantoms	"Scenes (From Another World)"	Rubble RUBCDBOX2	2015	5 x CD, Compilation, Enhanced; UK release
