= Terry Black =

Canadian pop singer (1949–2009)

- Born: February 3, 1949; Vancouver, British Columbia, Canada
- Died: June 28, 2009 (aged 60) Kamloops, British Columbia, Canada
- Genres: Pop
- Occupations: Singer, radio DJ
- Years active: 1964–1982
- Labels: Tollie Records, ARC Records, Dunhill, GRT, Kama Sutra, Yorkville, Columbia, Duke Street Records, Underground Records, Avanti

Terry Black (February 3, 1949 – June 28, 2009) was a Canadian pop singer and teen idol, born in Vancouver, British Columbia.

== Career ==
Black's debut U.S. single, "Unless You Care", was released in 1964, when Black was 15. The song was written and produced by P. F. Sloan and Steve Barri and featured backing from Glen Campbell and Leon Russell, who were at that time studio musicians. The song was a major hit in Canada and also cracked the U.S. Billboard Hot 100, and Black was awarded the "Male Vocalist of the Year" award at the Maple Music Awards in 1965.

Black had several further singles through 1966, such as the Sloan-Barri tunes "Kisses for My Baby" and "Say It Again", Sam Cooke's "Only Sixteen", and "Baby's Gone" (written by Graham Bonney and Barry Mason), all of which were produced by Sloan and Barri. He released a Sloan-Barri produced album, Only 16 in 1965, on the Canadian ARC Records label. Black then moved to the U.S., and his remaining unreleased tracks (plus some alternate versions of released songs) were assembled into another Sloan-Barri produced album, The Black Plague, in 1966.

Under the name "Terence" he released the album An Eye for An Ear by Decca Records in the U.S. and Canada in 1969. The album was also released with a different cover by MCA Records in Germany. A hoped-for film career failed to materialize, and Black returned to Canada.

Black also joined the cast for the Toronto production of Hair in 1969. He married a member of the cast, Laurel Ward, in 1970, and from 1972 to 1982 the pair released several singles together as Black and Ward, such as the minor hit "Goin' Down (On the Road to L.A.)", peaking at No. 57, 2/12/72. He also performed, alongside Ward, with Dr. Music, including the 1972 Canadian hit "Sun Goes By". In 1979, Black performed the song "Moondust" on the soundtrack for the movie Meatballs. Black and Ward divorced in 1993.

In the 2000s, Black hosted an oldies radio show in British Columbia. He had multiple sclerosis late in life and died as a result of the condition on June 28, 2009, in Kamloops, British Columbia, Canada.

== Discography ==
=== Albums ===
==== Solo ====
Year	Album	Record Label
1965	Only 16	Arc Records (Canada)
1966	The Black Plague	Arc Records (Canada)
1969	An Eye for An Ear (as "Terence")	Decca Records DL75137
1979	Meatballs soundtrack (2 songs)	

==== with Laurel Ward ====
Year	Album
1982	All Night Long

==== with Dr. Music ====
Year	Album	Canada	Record Label
1972	Dr. Music	35	GRT Records
1973	Dr. Music II	78	GRT Records
1974	Bedtime Story	–	GRT Records
1984	Circa '84	–	Canadian Talent Library

=== Singles ===
==== Solo ====
Year	Title	Peak chart positions		Record Label	B-side	Album
Year	Title	CAN	US	Record Label	B-side	Album
1964	"Dry Bones"	–	–	Arc Records (Canada)	"Sinner Man"	
1964	"Unless You Care"	2	99	Arc Records (Canada)	"Can't We Go Somewhere"	Only 16
1965	"Say It Again"	24	–	Arc Records (Canada)	"Everyone Can Tell"	Only 16
1965	"Little Liar"	10	–	Arc Records (Canada)	"Ordinary Girl"	Only 16
1965	"Only Sixteen"	14	–	Arc Records (Canada)	"How Many Guys"	Only 16
1965	"Poor Little Fool"	6	–	Arc Records (Canada)	"Kisses for My Baby"	Only 16
1966	"Rainbow"	17	–	Arc Records (Canada)	"There's Something About You"	
1966	"I (Who Have Nothing)"	–	–	Arc Records (Canada)	"Baby's Gone"	
1966	"Baby's Gone"	–	–	Arc Records (Canada)	"Ordinary Girl"	
1967	"Wishing Star"	–	–	Arc Records (Canada)	"Kick Me Charlie"	
1972	"Ridin' a Daydream"	–	–	GRT Records	"Boutique"	

==== with Laurel Ward ====
Year	Title	Peak chart positions		Record Label	B-side
Year	Title	CAN	US	Record Label	B-side
1972	"Goin' Down (On the Road to L.A.)"	99	57	Kama Sutra Records	"Oh Babe"
1972	"Warm Days, Warm Nights"	–	–	Kama Sutra Records	"Love Is Gone"
1973	"Love is the Feeling"	87	–	Yorkville Records	"Now's the Time"
1975	"It's Your Love"	–	–	RCA Records	"Delight"
1975	"Back Up (Against Your Persuasion)"	35	–	RCA Records	"This Is My Confusion"
1976	"Long Time"	–	–	RCA Records	"Restless"
1982	"Waves of Emotion"	–	–	Duke Street Records	"Wild Out"

==== with Dr. Music ====
Year	Title	Peak chart positions		Record Label	B-side	Album
Year	Title	CAN	US	Record Label	B-side	Album
1971	"Try a Little Harder"	78	–	GRT Records	"The Land"	Dr. Music
1971	"One More Mountain to Climb"	14	–	GRT Records	"I Can Hear Her Calling Him"	Dr. Music
1971	"Sun Goes By"	23	–	GRT Records	"Gospel Rock"	Dr. Music
1972	"Long Time Comin' Home"	28	–	GRT Records	"Say Real"	Dr. Music II
1973	"Tryin' Times"	–	–	GRT Records	"In My Life"	Dr. Music II
