= Revolution Records (Canada) =

Canadian record company

- Founded: 1968; 58 years ago
- Founder: Mort Ross, Doug Riley, Terry Brown
- Distributor: Compo Co.
- Genre: Popular music
- Country of origin: Canada

Revolution Records was a Canadian Record company. It was also the parent company for the Revolver label. It had success with hits from artists such as Dianne Brooks and Motherlode.

== Background ==
Incorporated in October 1968, the company was co-founded by Mort Ross, Doug Riley and Terry Brown. The company started up in February, 1969. They were located at 31 Prince Arthur Avenue, Toronto.

Ross was a veteran Canadian composer, instrumentalist and arranger. He also composed advertising jingles.

In the beginning, the intention was not to start off as a record company. They wanted to build a recording facility with equipment superior to that of other Canadian studios at the time. But with the studio having been built and ready for business in August 1969, two Doug Riley demos that had been recorded with Dianne Brooks as the vocalist. Impressed with what they had heard and the demos being "So good they had to be released", Revolver Records came into being.

Revolution's label for releases was Revolver Records. In addition to Brooks and Motherlode, artists to have recordings released on the Revolver label also included Leigh Ashford, Chimo! and Moe Koffman.

== History ==
=== 1960s ===
By March Dianne Brooks' single, "Walkin' on My Mind" had been released by their subsidiary Revolver. By 21 April, the song had entered the RPM Weekly Canadian Content Chart at No. 10. By May 2, it made it to No. 4 on the RPM chart. It peaked at No. 67 nationally. Mort Ross had travelled to New York to set up the distribution deal with Ray Charles's Tangerine label for the United States distribution of Brooks' new record single. The deal also involved any future releases from Brooks. A distribution deal was set up for England with Morgan Records handling that task. For distribution in Canada, the Compo Company was chosen. They were also negotiating US and UK distribution deals and package tours for Motherlode.

Also in May, Motherlode's new single "When I Die" had been released on Revolver REVS-002. The label incorporated a promo using gimmick mailers in their extensive campaign for the group.

By September 1969, "When I Die" had got to No. 12 on the Cash Box Top 100. It got to No.1 on the RPM Weekly chart.

As it appeared in Billboard's October 25, 1969 issue, due to corporate disagreements between partners, the company would be splitting. Terry Brown and Doug Riley who would continue to work together had split with Mort Ross. By the end of November, Ross had total control of Revolution Records Limited and Revolution Music Limited. At the time, artists under contract to the label included Motherlode, Dianne Brooks, Moe Koffman and Hagood Hardy.

=== 1970s ===
In 1970, Hagood Hardy's single, "New World in the Morning" bw "Soon", was released on REVS-007. It was the artist's first single for the label. The songs were performed live on The Barbara McNair Show on November 29, 1970.

As of February 1971, Mort Ross was president of Revolution Music Ltd. and Doug Riley was president of Dr. Music Productions.

In December 1970, the group Leigh Ashford had their single out on the Revolver label. A distribution deal between Revolver and RCA had been signed. In addition to Leigh Ashford, other acts included Chimo!, Motherlode and Jam Jar. By early 1971, Leigh Ashford's single "Dickens" was charting at CKOC. It was also making its way up the RPM100 Singles chart.
