= Poor Little Fool =

1958 single by Ricky Nelson

- Danish release picture sleeve

Single by Ricky Nelson

from the album Ricky Nelson
- B-side: "Don't Leave Me This Way"
- Released: June 23, 1958
- Recorded: April 17, 1958
- Studio: United Recording Studios, Hollywood, California
- Genre: Country; Rock and roll; doo-wop
- Length: 2:32
- Label: Imperial
- Songwriter: Sharon Sheeley
- Producers: Ricky Nelson, Ozzie Nelson, Jimmie Haskell

Ricky Nelson singles chronology
"My Bucket's Got a Hole in It" / "Believe What You Say" (1958)	"Poor Little Fool" (1958)	"Lonesome Town" / "I Got a Feeling" (1958)

"Poor Little Fool" is a song written by Sharon Sheeley and first recorded by Ricky Nelson in 1958.

== Background ==
Sheeley wrote the song when she was 15 years old. She had met Elvis Presley, and he encouraged her to write. It was based on her disappointment following a short-lived relationship with Don Everly of The Everly Brothers. Sheeley sought Ricky Nelson to record the tune. She drove to his house, and claimed her car had broken down. He came to her aid, and she sprang the song on him. Her version was at a much faster tempo than his recording.

The song was recorded by Ricky Nelson on April 17, 1958, and released on Imperial Records through its catalog number: 5528. The recording features the background vocals of the Jordanaires. On August 4, 1958, it became the first number-one song on Billboard magazine's then-new Hot 100 chart, replacing the magazine's Jockeys and Top 100 charts. It spent two weeks at the number-one spot. It also reached the top 10 on the Billboard Country and Rhythm and Blues charts (number three on both). Following its success, Sheeley worked with Eddie Cochran.

"Poor Little Fool" became a radio hit when it was released as part of a four-song extended-play 45 rpm disc, which was excerpted from the artist's second LP, Ricky Nelson. Responding to the buzz, Lew Chudd, the founder and head of Imperial Records, rushed out a single version (on both 45 and 78 rpm). Nelson objected, however, believing that the move would hurt sales of the EP. Under his contract with Imperial, the singer had approval rights for all picture-sleeve art, so to express his displeasure with Chudd's decision, he chose not to select a photograph for the "Poor Little Fool" single. As a result, "Poor Little Fool" was the only Ricky Nelson single released by Imperial to be issued in the United States without a photo in a plain-label, cut-out sleeve.

== Release ==
Poor Little Fool was released under Imperial Records on the June 23, 1958. It was included on Ricky Nelson's EP, Unchained Melody, as well as his self-titled album Ricky Nelson.

== Critical reception ==
Cashbox called the song a "beautiful rock-a-ballad that should jump into the winners' circle in short order". Tom Breihan of Stereogum called "Poor Little Fool" a "negligible midtempo bopper" with a whiny vocal performance and a "staid plonk" of a rhythm.

== Charts ==
Chart (1958–1959)	Peak position
Canada (CHUM Hit Parade)	1
Norway (VG-lista)	6
UK Singles (Official Charts)	4
US Billboard Hot 100	1
US Billboard Country & Western Best Sellers	3
US Billboard Rhythm & Blues Best Sellers	3
US Cash Box Top 100	2

== Other versions ==
- The "Dodgers" and Johnny Angel released a cover version of the song in 1958 on Skyway 45-119-AA.
- The Fleetwoods recorded a version in 1962 on their album The Best Goodies of the Oldies.
- Terry Black released a version of the song in 1965 on his debut album, Only 16, and it reached number six in Canada.
- Frank Mills released a version in 1972 in Canada. It was one of two of his mainly instrumental recordings to include his own vocals.

== See also ==
- List of Billboard Hot 100 number-one singles from 1958 to 1969
