= Grant Smith & The Power =

- Origin: Toronto, Ontario, Canada
- Genres: Rock-soul
- Years active: 1960s
- Labels: BOO, MGM
- Spinoffs: Motherlode
- Website: Official URL

Grant Smith & The Power were a popular Canadian (from Toronto) rock-soul outfit from the 1960s that had a hit with a cover of Jackie Edwards' "Keep On Running" (previously a big hit for The Spencer Davis Group) and was also a training ground for musicians who went on to the likes of McKenna Mendelson Mainline and Motherlode.

== Group replaces Eddie Spencer with Grant Smith ==
Forming early in October 1966, vocalist Eddie Spencer, organist Val Stevens, guitarist Les Morris, bassist Mike Harrison, drummer Charlie Miller, (his brother) trumpeter Ralph Miller, and Jerry Mann (Shymanski) on tenor saxophone performed in popular Toronto R&B venues as Eddie Spencer & The Power. On December 31, 1966, the band announced that a new frontman, vocalist Ellis Grant Smith, would replace Eddie Spencer, and that guitarist Jim Pauley would take over from Les Morris. Smith and Pauley were both from popular London (Ontario) band E. G. Smith & The Express. Shortly after, the band's advisor, Brian "Otis" Ayers – who had earlier played with Ralph Miller in Las Vegas showband The Beau Keys – replaced Jerry Mann on sax. Within a few weeks, Wayne "Stoney" Stone, another former member of The Express, joined the band, creating a unique two-drummer lineup.

During its first year, the band established a solid fan base on southern Ontario's dance circuit, billed either as E. G. Smith & The Power or as Grant Smith & The Power. Shortly after a June 27, 1967 show at the Broom and Stone in Scarborough, Toronto, Charlie Miller left the band. With the lineup reduced to a single drummer, Wayne Stone cut his teeth in the solo drummer chair at a week-long summer resort gig in Grand Bend, Ontario, after which the band headed to the United States, spending 1967's famous "Summer of Love" working clubs in the Boston area and in upstate New York. On the band's return to Toronto in early September, Jim Pauley left the band and was replaced by guitarist Jon Palma.

In the fall of 1967, the band recorded its debut single, an R&B version of "Keep On Running", previously a hit for The Spencer Davis Group, at Toronto music mogul Art Snider’s Sound Canada studios in Don Mills, Ontario. Backed with "Her Own Life", an original composition by Grant Smith and organist Val Stevens, "Keep On Running" was released in January, 1968, on early indie label Boo! Records. Within weeks, the band had recorded a second single, "Thinkin' About You" b/w "You Got What I Want", both penned by Toronto songwriter Al Rain. Both singles were recorded with guest sax player and de facto musical director Steve Kennedy, who in early 1968 flew down to Boston to join the band full-time while it was on tour. In New York City during the same tour, the band was offered a deal by Tony Orlando, pop star and A&R man for MGM, and in the early spring, "Thinkin' About You" was released on MGM Records.

While in New York, guitarist Kenny Marco replaced Palma. Marco had played with The Upset, but especially with Ayres and Ralph Miller in The Beau Keys during the mid-1960s. On March 17, 1968, between U.S. dates, Grant Smith & The Power opened for The Hollies and Spanky & Our Gang at Toronto's O'Keefe Centre. The following month, the band headed out on another leg of U.S. touring.

== Harrison joins McKenna Mendelson Mainline ==
Back in Canada later that summer, former Dianne Brooks, Eric Mercury and The Soul Searchers member, Steve Kennedy joined full-time on saxophone. Following a show at the Hidden Valley in Huntsville, Ontario on October 13, Mike Harrison left to join McKenna Mendelson Mainline. With Val Stevens leaving at about the same time to form his own jazz trio (he later spent some time in England, where he had spells with Tucky Buzzard and Steve Hillage's Khan), Kennedy convinced the group to recruit fellow former Soul Searcher William "Smitty" Smith on the grounds that he could play bass on the pedals of his Hammond organ, meaning there would be fewer musicians to pay.

The revised line up, comprising Grant Smith (vocals), Ralph Miller (trumpet), Brian Ayres and Steve Kennedy (saxophone), Ken Marco (guitar), Wayne Stone (drums), and William Smith (keyboards) was responsible for recording the bulk of the group's album in November 1968, which also included the band’s debut single. In early 1969, however, Marco, Kennedy, Smith and Stone left to form Motherlode, who had a massive hit with "When I Die".

Drummer Sonny "Jiggs" Bernardi (from The Spirit Revue) and keyboard player Josef Chirowski (from various bands, including Mandala and The Power Project) came in as replacements and remained until February 1970 when they were recruited to join Crowbar. (Chirowski later did sessions for Alice Cooper among others.)

Bassist Joe Agnello also came in at this time from the Lee Ashford Blues Band, though he soon left to rejoin his old friends in a renamed Leigh Ashford. Former Franklin Sheppard sideman, Frank De Felice, filled in for the last few months on drums before joining Jericho in March 1970. The band split up at this stage.

== Recordings ==
- 45 - "Keep On Running" c/w "Her Own Life" (BOO 681), 1968
- 45 - "Thinkin’ About You" c/w "You Got What I Want" (MGM 13979), 1968
- LP - Grant Smith & The Power (BOO 6802), 1968
