= Marc Tanner Band =

- Years active: 1979–1980
- Labels: Elektra
- Past members: Marc Tanner; Linda Stanley; Steve Mann; Stepen Lyle; Michael Stevens; Irvin Kramer; Ronny Edwards; Joe Romersa

The Marc Tanner Band was an American rock band fronted by Marc Tanner that released two albums on the Elektra label. They had a minor hit with the song "Elena" in 1979.

== Background ==
During their time the band released two albums, No Escape in 1979 and Temptation in 1980. They released two singles in 1979, "Elena" b/w "Lady in Blue" and "She's So High" b/w "Never Again". They released two more the following year, "Hold Your Head Up" b/w "Don't Say No (Surrender)", and "Hot and Cold" b/w "Temptation" in 1980.

== Career ==
By February 1979, the group's debut album No Escape was released on Elektra, supported by the single "Elena". Among the musicians that appeared on the album were William "Smitty" Smith, formerly of the group Motherlode and Vanetta Fields.

For the week ending April 7, 1979, their single "Elena" had moved up from previous weeks position of 53 to 45, with "I Will Survive" by Gloria Gaynor at No. 1. Also in April that year with a line up that had been together for two months, the band appeared at the Golden Bear in Huntington Beach, playing a 51-minute set. Billboard reviewer Eliot Tiegel commented on the intensity of the band with the bass, 2 guitars and drums drowning out the other instruments, with a suggestion that this promising band should respect the beauty of its instruments rather than concentrate on the wattage output. In May 1979, Billboard had recommended "She's So High" as a top single pick. Towards the end of May their record label was wrapping up a promo for the band's album No Escape. The marketing ploy had given out ten thousand tie clips in the form of handcuffs. There were also requests for the items from the nontraditional outlets, usually retail stores and radio. These were restaurants and night clubs. There was also an agenda to promote "Never Again" as a single.

It was reported in the September 29 issue of Billboard that the group were working on a new album. The group's second album Temptation was more towards band album in comparison to the previous which leaned towards a Marc Tanner solo album.

The band was managed by Lewis Kaplan who also managed Carole King's daughter Louise Goffin.

=== Later years ===
Tanner has since embarked on a career in production and songwriting and is currently executive producer of a broadway play.

"Elena" is featured on the 4 CD compilation California Groove II, released in 2010.

== Members ==
- Marc Tanner - vocals
- Linda Stanley - vocals
- Steve Mann - flute, saxophone
- Stephen Lyle - keyboards
- Michael Stevens - lead guitar
- Irvin Kramer - guitar
- Ronny Edwards - bass
- Joe Romersa - drums

== Discography ==
Singles
Title	Release info	Year	Notes
"Elena" / "Lady In Blue"	Elektra E-46003	1979	
"She's So High" / "Never Again"	Elektra E-46043	1979	
"Never Again" / "Never Again"	Elektra AS-11419	1979	12", 33 ⅓ RPM, Promo
"Hold Your Head Up" / "Don't Say No (Surrender)"	Elektra E-46589	1980	
"Hot And Cold" / "Temptation"	Elektra E-46614	1980	

Albums
Title	Release info	Year	F	Notes
No Escape	Elektra 6E-168	1979	LP	
Temptation	Elektra 6E-240	1980	LP	
