= Elena (song) =

Single by The Marc Tanner Band

from the album No Escape
- B-side: "Lady in Blue"
- Released: January 1979
- Genre: Rock, pop
- Length: 3:29
- Label: Elektra E-46003
- Songwriter(s): Marc Tanner, Nat Jeffrey, Jeff Monday
- Producer(s): Nat Jeffrey

The Marc Tanner Band singles chronology
"Elena" (1979)	"She's So High" (1979)

"Elena" is the debut single by the West Coast rock group, Marc Tanner Band. It was a Hot 100 hit for them in 1979.

== Background ==
The song was written by Marc Tanner, Nat Jeffrey, and Jeff Monday. Nat Jeffrey also produced the single. It was released on the Elektra label, cat# E-46003 in January 1979. Two of the features in the song described by Billboard were the wailing sax solo and the sassy vocals. The single was taken from the group's No Escape album, released on Elektra 6E-168.

== Chart performance ==
As reported for the week ending April 7, 1979, "Elena" moved up to No. 45 on the Billboard Hot 100. It spent six weeks on the chart.
