= Tapestry (musical group) =

- Origin: Canada
- Genres: Pop music
- Years active: 1970s
- Label: Polydor
- Past members: Jack Winters; Heather Woodburn; Judy Harmon aka Judi Jensen

Tapestry was an early 1970s Canadian musical group fronted by singers Jack Winters, Heather Woodburn and Judy Harmon aka Judi Jensen. They released several singles and had a hit with "The Music Doesn't Seem to Be Going Anywhere". Some of their other singles also charted.

== Background ==
In 1972, the group was made up of Jack Winters (group leader) from Montreal, Heather Woodburn of Montreal and Judi Jensen from Toronto. During the 1960s, Jensen was a singer in the Canadian band, The Regents.

At some stage they were joined by Barry Albert from the band Life who was dissatisfied with the way things were progressing.

== Career ==
The group's first single was released in October 1971. It was "Love Me Brother" bw "Coming Into Los Angeles", released on Polydor 2065 091. It had a good review in the RPM November 20 issue with the reviewer referring to it as blue-eyed gospel soul that had captured ears of several MOT programmers as well as the Maple Leaf System. It was also on five major market play lists and two secondary markets lists. It entered the RPM100 chart at #88 on week ending November 20.

By June 1972, their second single, "Country Music" had already been released. They had been doing very well on the Canadian and US club circuit. Led by Jack Winters, the line up at the time consisted of himself, Heather Woodburn and Judi Jensen. They were booked to appear at the Maple Music Junket in Montreal at 7:30pm on Monday June 5.

Having tried to get things happening with a single for some time, things were now looking good for the group. The single that showed promise was "The Music Doesn't Seem to Be Going Anywhere". It was recorded in Canada in 1972. An account of the song's lyrics was given by RPM Weekly in the November 4 issue. The magazine also predicted that it would emerge for them in the charts. By November 25, the single had entered the RPM100 Singles chart at #100. By January 14, 1973, it had moved up to #62 from the previous week's position of #72. By the 20th it had fallen back to #86. It was also at #36 on the Programmers Adult Contemporary Additions list.

By March 1973, they had a new single out which was taken from their forthcoming Down By Maple River album. The single "Everything's Bringing Me Down (Runnin' From The Years)" was written by Jack Winters. It entered The Programmers Adult Contemporary Play List at #98 for the week ending March 10.

By the end of March the album was released by Polydor. The group was set to take a nationwide tour to promote it.

By April 14, "Everything's Bringing Me Down" was 7 places up from #72 at #65 on The Programmers Adult Contemporary Play List. An article in the April 14 issue of RPM The Programmers Weekly confirmed that the group was now a duo, consisting of Jack Winters and Heather Woodburn who were now husband and wife. They had recently done a tour across Western Canada which was a success. That month, they released another single, "Down by Maple River" on Polydor 2065 192. It entered the RPM100 chart at #96 on the week ending May 5, 1973.

== Discography ==
Singles
Act	Release	Catalogue	Year	Notes
Tapestry	"Love Me Brother" / "Coming Into Los Angeles"	Polydor 2065 091	1971	
Tapestry	"Country Music" / "Begin With You And Me"	Polydor 2065 120	1972	
Tapestry	"The Music Doesn't Seem To Be Going Anywhere" / "I Believe In Loving You"	Polydor 2065 152	1972	
Tapestry	"Everything Is Bringin' Me Down (Runnin' From The Years)" / " I Wish I Was Going Back Home"	Polydor 2065 177	1973	
Tapestry	"Down By Maple River" / "Cowboy Song"	Polydor 2065 192	1973	
Tapestry	"California" / "Silver Bird"	Polydor 2065 204	1973	

Albums
Act	Release	Catalogue	Year	Notes
Tapestry	Down By Maple River	Polydor 2424 078	1973	

== Later years ==
Judi Jensen, aka Judith Harmon, died on Friday, June 7, 2019, at age 76.

== Links ==
- YouTube: Tapestry - He Has Changed (Canada Psychedelic Folk 1973)
- ArtistInfo: Tapestry
