= Buckstone Hardware =

- Origin: North Bay, Ontario, Canada
- Genre: Rock music
- Years active: 1969 - 1970
- Label: Apex
- Spinoffs: Aaron Space
- Spinoff of: The Riffkin

Buckstone Hardware was a Canadian rock group who had a hit in 1969 with "Pack it In". It did well on the RPM 100 chart as well as the Canadian Content chart.

== Background ==
The group's origins go back to 1967, with a four-piece North Bay band called The Riffkin. They added a fifth member and moved to Toronto. In 1969, they changed their name to Buckstone Hardware.

In the summer of 1969, Buckstone Hardware appeared at a concert that was opened by Motherlode. The Guess Who were also at the event. When Buckstone Hardware came on to do their set, guitarist Jake Thomas broke the high E string of his guitar within the first minute. He didn't have a spare guitar and had to finish the song. After the song finished, he had a tap on his shoulder and it was Randy Bachman offering him the use of his guitar. After the next song Bachman returned his guitar to him with the new string installed. After the show, he wanted to thank Bachman and went to the tent where the Guess Who were in but he was stopped by security.

During their time they shared billing with acts such as Manchild and Brutus. They were referred to by Billboard as one of Toronto's leading bands.

Their manager was Michael Watson.

== Career ==
=== 1968 to 1969 ===
In 1969, the North Bay group, having appeared recently on the Sunday Morning Show on CBC-TV and their week run at Electric Circus, along with appearances local and further afield had set a good scene for their record release. The single, "Pack it In" which was cut at Sound Canada Studios was released on Apex 77098. It was recorded by Greg Hambleton for Meatworm Productions.

Hit single

For the week of May 19, 1969, the group's single, "Pack It In" entered the RPM Canadian Content Chart at #9. The following week (week of May 26, 1969) "Pack It In" entered the RPM 100 chart at #99.

By June 9, the single got to #2 on the Canadian Content Chart. On June 20, the single was in the "Hit Bound category on the CKLG Boss 30 chart. It was still holding the Canadian Content position of #2 until June 23. That week the CHUM report had the record as the third voted for simultaneous play by the Maple Leaf System.

It peaked on the RPM 100 at #33 on July 21.

Further activities

The group along with The Mid-Knights and The Five Shy appeared at Toronto's El Zorro discotheque on July 25.

They were booked to appear at the "Freak Out" festival. A 72-hour event that ran on the Labor Day period from August 29 to September 1, held at Rock Hill, 16 miles north of Orangeville. Other acts booked to appear were Lighthouse, Motherlode, The Guess Who and Life etc.

Also, that year the group appeared at the Wonderland Pavilion in London, Ontario to open up the show for Muddy Waters.

=== 1970 ===
They were booked to play at the Transcontinental pop festival 70 fest. that ran from June 27 to June 28. Other groups to appear were, The Band, Janis Joplin, Delaney, Bonnie & Friends, The Grateful Dead, Cat, Eric Andersen, Ten Years After, Traffic, Ian & Sylvia, The Great Speckled Bird, Sha Na Na, Buddy Guy, Tom Rush, James & The Good Brothers and Sea Train.

The group was having differences in ideas musically and by May 1970 they had broken up.

== Post Buckstone Hardware ==
Jake Thomas would later become a member of Aaron Space. Manager Michael Watson would later do well as a promo rep for CBS and then Capitol.

== Members ==
- Russell Franklin - drums
- Charlie “Jake” Thomas - lead guitar
- Ralph Wiber - drums
- Jacques "Jocko" Chartrand
- Peter Marsh - vocals
