= Dickens (song) =

1970 single by Leigh Ashford

Single by Leigh Ashford

from the album Kinfolk
- B-side: "Lee Oompa Kum Pah Pah"
- Released: 1970
- Genre: Rock
- Label: Revolver 75-1040
- Songwriters: Gord Waszek, Buzz Shearman
- Producer: Mort Ross

Leigh Ashford singles chronology
"Country Place" (1969)	"Dickens" (1970)	"Never Give Myself" (1971)

"Dickens" was a hit for Canadian group Leigh Ashford in 1971. It was a track from their Kinfolk album that was released that year.

== Background ==
The single which was composed by Gord Waszek and Buzz Shearman was backed with the nonsense song, "Lee Oompa Kum Pah Pah". It was from their 1971 Kinfolk album which was produced by Mort Ross and released on RCA LSP 4520, Revolver LSP-4520.

"Dickens" came 3rd with 5.3 in the Maple Leaf System competition with Tom Northcott coming first with "I Think It's Going to Rain Today" at 6.3, results published in Billboard, January 2, 1971. As reported in the Jan, 23 edition of RPM Weekly, RCA had faith in the single's potential and their promotion team were taking advantage of the current chart action with the intention of bolstering it. The team that was pushing it consisted of Ed Preston, Scott Richards and Johnny Murphy.

It was mentioned in the January 30, 1971 issue of Billboard that re-mixed and re-edited versions of "Dickens" were being sent to rock music stations.

== Chart action ==
By the 23rd of January, the single was doing well with some chart action across Canada. It was also at #68 on the RPM100 Singles chart. By February 6th, it was charting at CKOC. It eventually got to #27 in Canada.
