= Only 16 =

Studio album by Terry Black
- Released: 1965
- Genre: Pop
- Length: 27:03
- Label: Arc (Canada) 5002
- Producer: P.F. Sloan, Steve Barri, Lou Adler

Terry Black chronology
Only 16 (1965)	The Black Plague (1966)

Singles from Only 16
- 1. "Unless You Care"/ "Can't We Go Somewhere" Released: July 1964; 2. "Say It Again"/ "Everyone Can Tell" Released: January 1965; 3. "Little Liar"/ "Ordinary Girl" Released: May 1965; 4. "Only Sixteen"/ "How Many Guys" Released: August 1965; 5. "Poor Little Fool"/ "Kisses for My Baby" Released: November 1965

Professional ratings
Review scores
Source	Rating
Allmusic	3/5 stars

Only 16 is the debut album by Terry Black and was released in 1965.

The album featured five songs that were released as singles: "Unless You Care" which reached #2 in Canada, "Poor Little Fool", which reached #6, "Little Liar", which reached #10, "Only Sixteen", which reached #14, and "Say It Again", which reached #24.

== Track listing ==
All songs written and composed by P.F. Sloan and Steve Barri except where noted.

1. "Only Sixteen" (Sam Cooke) – 2:13
2. "Can't We Go Somewhere" – 1:59
3. "Little Liar" – 2:15
4. "Ordinary Girl" – 2:20
5. "World Without Love" (Lennon–McCartney) – 2:45
6. "Unless You Care" – 2:01
7. "Poor Little Fool" (Sharon Sheeley) – 2:10
8. "Bad to Me" (Lennon–McCartney) – 2:12
9. "Say It Again" – 2:10
10. "How Many Guys" – 2:17
11. "Everyone Can Tell" – 2:08
12. "Kisses for My Baby" – 2:19

== Credits ==
- Produced by: Sloan and Barri (2–6, 8–12), Adler (1, 7)

== Charts ==
Singles

Year	Single	Chart	Position
1964	"Unless You Care"	RPM	2
1964	"Unless You Care"	Billboard Hot 100	99
1965	"Say It Again"	RPM	24
1965	"Little Liar"	RPM	10
1965	"Only Sixteen"	RPM	14
1965	"Poor Little Fool"	RPM	6
