= Pack It In =

Single by Buckstone Hardware
- A-side: "Pack It In"
- B-side: "You're Still Feelin' Better"
- Released: 1969
- Studio: Sound Canada Studios
- Label: Apex 77098
- Composers: Hedely, Wilber
- Producer: A Meatworm Production

Pack It In was a hit for Canadian rock group Buckstone Hardware in 1969. It made it into both the RPM 100 and the Canadian Content charts.

== Background ==
A fertile ground for the release of the single had been prepared with the group's recent appearances on CBC-TV's Sunday Morning Show and a week run at Electric Circus. This was also complemented with the band's appearances local and further afield.

The single, "Pack it In" backed with "You're Still Feelin' Better" was recorded by Greg Hambleton for Meatworm Productions., and was cut at Sound Canada Studios. It was released on the Apex label (Cat no. 77098).

== Chart info ==
"Pack It In" made its debut on the RPM Canadian Content Chart at #9 on the week of May 19, 1969. The following week (week of May 26, 1969) it debuted on the RPM 100 chart at #99.

By June 9, the single got to #2 on the Canadian Content Chart. On June 20, the single was in the "Hit Bound category on the CKLG Boss 30 chart. It was still holding the Canadian Content position of #2 until June 23. That week the CHUM report had the record as the third voted for simultaneous play by the Maple Leaf System.

Its peak position of #33 on the RPM 100 chart was reached on July 21.
