= Scenes (from Another World) =

Song by The Scene
- B-side: "You're in a Bad Way"
- Released: 1967
- Label: B.T. Puppy 533
- Songwriters: N. Sheppard, J. Fishman
- Producer: Neil Sheppard

"Scenes (from Another World)" is a 1967 single by Canadian rock group the Scene. It was their only release, reaching number 13 on the RPM chart.

== Background ==
The chance for the Scene to record the single for the B.T. Puppy label came about as a result of Neil Sheppard (also known as Neil Ship) being in New York. In New York Sheppard met the label owners, Hank Medress and the Tokens, and ended up doing some studio work for them. In late 1967, he helped his brother Michael Ship, a member of the Scene, to get a one-off single deal. The result was the psychedelic rock flavored "Scenes (from Another World)" (with "You're in a Bad Way" as the B side), which was released on the B.T. Puppy 533 label that year. Music magazine, Billboard referred to the Scene as "a top Montreal group" in the October 21, 1967 issue. They also wrote that "Scenes from Another World" had made its international debut on the B.T. Puppy label.

== Charts ==
The October 28, 1967 issue of RPM confirmed the single had been released. The single had entered the RPM Canadian Hits chart at number 15 as recorded by RPM Music Weekly on November 25. The following week on December 2, RPM recorded the movement from number 15 to the number 14 spot. The following week it was at number 13. The week after, on the 16th, it was still holding the number 13 position. By December 23, it had dropped down to number 15.
