= Little Liar =

Single by Terry Black

from the album Only 16
- B-side: "Ordinary Girl"
- Released: May 1965
- Genre: Pop music
- Length: 2:15
- Label: Arc 1090
- Songwriters: P.F. Sloan, Steve Barri
- Producer: Lou Adler

Terry Black singles chronology
"Say It Again" (1965)	"Little Liar" (1965)	"Only Sixteen" (1965)

"Little Liar" is a song written by P.F. Sloan and Steve Barri and performed by Terry Black. It reached #10 in Canada in 1965. The song was featured on his 1965 album, Only 16.

The song was produced by Lou Adler.
