= Kenny Marco =

Canadian guitarist (1947–2025)

- Also known as: Ken Marco
- Born: Kenneth John Marco; February 14, 1947; Brantford, Ontario, Canada
- Died: May 24, 2025 (aged 78) Saskatoon, Saskatchewan, Canada
- Genres: Rock music
- Occupation: Musician
- Instrument: Guitar
- Years active: 1960s to 2025
- Label: Quality Records
- Formerly of: Grant Smith & The Power, Motherlode, Dr. Music, Blood, Sweat And Tears
- Spouse: Judith Anne Chiki

Kenneth John Marco (February 14, 1947 – May 24, 2025) was a Canadian guitarist who was a member of rock groups such as Grant Smith & The Power, Motherlode and Dr. Music. He was also a member of Blood, Sweat & Tears.

== Background ==
Marco has been described as the most prolific guitarist in the history of Canadian rock and roll. He has been a member of supergroups in the 1970s from Motherlode to Dr. Music and Blood Sweat & Tears. In later years, the musical genres he played in include American funk/jazz and Brazilian cha cha.

The son of a music store owner, he grew up in Brantford. The expected music path for him was to play the accordion like his brothers. Instead he took a different direction and learnt the guitar. He got his first guitar while still working as a newspaper boy on his paper route. He later attended Pauline Johnson Collegiate in Brantford, Ontario. He joined the high school band The Galaxies, and later at age 17, he hit the road with the Beau-Keys, his first road band, leaving his mother looking anxious as he left home.

Marco died from cancer in Saskatoon, Saskatchewan, on May 24, 2025, at the age of 78.

== Career ==
=== 1960s to 1980s ===
In 1968, he played guitar on Grant Smith & The Power's debut album, Keep On Running. Among the musicians on the album were Wayne Stone, William "Smitty" Smith on keyboards and Steve Kennedy on saxophone. There was some dissatisfaction felt by these musicians. They were unhappy about playing mostly covers. They were also disappointed with the lack of success of the record album. Leaving the band, the four of them relocated to London, Ontario, and formed the group Motherlode. They went on to have the hit "When I Die".

When Motherlode broke up in December 1969, Marco, Steve Kennedy and Wayne Stone went on to be members of Dr. Music in Toronto, Ontario, Canada. He replaced guitarist Jon Palma. As a member of Dr. Music, one of the albums he played on was the self-titled album in 1972, released on GRT RCC 23172. He played on the Tequila Sunrise by David Clayton-Thomas that was released that year.

=== 1990s to 2000s ===
In March 2015, Marco and Theresa Sokyrka were set to play a benefit concert for the Hope Cancer Centre. He had worked with Sokyrka previously, playing on her 2005 album, These Old Charms.
