= Memories of a Broken Promise =

Single by Motherlode
- B-side: "What Does It Take (To Win Your Love)"
- Released: 1969
- Genre: Pop soul
- Label: Revolver REVS-004; Buddah Records BDA 144
- Songwriter: Dianne Brooks
- Producer: Mort Ross

Motherlode singles chronology
"When I Die" (1969)	"Memories of a Broken Promise" (1969)	"Dear Old Daddy Bill" (1970)

"Memories of a Broken Promise" was a hit for Canadian group Motherlode in 1969. It was their second charting single.

== Background ==
The follow-up to their hit "When I Die", Motherlode released "Memories of a Broken Promise" which was written by Dianne Brooks. It was released in Canada on Revolver REVS 004 and in the US on Buddah 144. This being their second hit, it puts to rest the myth that Motherlode was a one hit wonder band. It would eventually be one of the BMI Canada Certificate of Honour winners of 1969.

== Chart performance ==
=== Canada ===
By November 5, 1969, the song had moved from #49 to #38 on the WMCA Radio 57 Survey chart. By November 22, the song was at #4 on the RPM Canadian Content Chart and at #55 on the Canadian National chart. It made it to the Canadian Top 40, peaking at #25 on the CHUM Charts, and #40 on the RPM Charts.

=== United States ===
By the end of November the song was also charting in the US. The song would spend a total of two weeks in the US charts, peaking at #99 on the CASH BOX Top 100 Singles chart. On the Bubbling Under Hot 100 charts, " Memories Of A Broken Promise" got as far as #116 while the B side "What Does It Take (To Win Your Love?)" got to #111.

== Links ==
- US Hot 100 Bubbling Under
