= Unless You Care =

Single by Terry Black

from the album Only 16
- B-side: "Can't We Go Somewhere"
- Released: July 1964 (CAN); October 1964 (US)
- Genre: Pop music
- Length: 2:01
- Label: Arc 1074 (CAN); Tollie 9026 (US)
- Songwriters: P.F. Sloan, Steve Barri
- Producers: P.F. Sloan, Steve Barri

Terry Black singles chronology
"Dry Bones" (1964)	"Unless You Care" (1964)	"Say It Again" (1965)

"Unless You Care" is a song written by P.F. Sloan and Steve Barri and performed by Terry Black. It reached No. 2 on Canada's RPM Top 40 & 5 and No. 99 on the U.S. Billboard Hot 100 in 1964. The song was featured on his 1965 album, Only 16.

The song was produced by Sloan and Barri. Glen Campbell and Leon Russell, who were session musicians at the time, performed on the record.

== Other versions ==
- Johnny Chester released a version of the song as a single in 1965 that went to No. 65 in Australia.
- Bobby Curtola released a version of the song as a single in 1969 in Canada, but it did not chart.
