= No Escape (album) =

Studio album by Marc Tanner Band
- Released: 1979
- Genre: Rock
- Label: Elektra 6E-168
- Producer: Nat Jeffrey; Glen Spreen (co-producer)

Marc Tanner Band chronology
| No Escape (1979) | Temptation (1980) |

No Escape is an album by the Marc Tanner Band which includes the single "Elena". It was released on the Electra label in 1979.

== Background ==
The album made its appearance in early 1979, released on Elektra 6E-168. It was produced by Nat Jeffrey and Glen Spreen. The ten songs on the album were written by Marc Tanner. Some of them were co-composed by Nat Jeffrey and Sal Marquez. Billboard picked the best songs as "Elena", "She's So High", "In A Spotlight" and "Edge Of Love". One of the musicians to play on the album was William "Smitty" Smith who was with the 1960s group Motherlode. Two well known musicians on the album were Vanetta Fields and Richie Zito.

It was re-released on CD through Wounded Bird Records in 2006.

== Promotion ==
Around April, the Marc Tanner Band featuring Linda Stanley performed 9 songs from the album at the Golden Bear in Huntington Beach, California. In May, Elektra/Asylum were wrapping up a promo for the album which was a blanket marketing strategy for another single from the album, "Never Again". 10,000 tie clips in the form of handcuffs were distributed to radio and retail outlets. There were also requests from non-music outlets in the L.A area such as restaurant staff and nightclubs for the items.

== Reception ==
For the week ending March 3, 1979, it entered the Billboard album chart at 160. By April 21, at its 8th week in the chart, it had fallen to 185.

== Track listing ==
Track listing
| No | Title | Composer | Time |
|---|---|---|---|
| A1 | "Never Again" | | 3:12 |
| A2 | "Crawlin'" | | 2:54 |
| A3 | "She's So High" | | 4:30 |
| A4 | "Elena" | | 3:27 |
| A5 | "Edge Of Love" | | 3:25 |
| B1 | "Getaway" | | 3:35 |
| B2 | "Lady In Blue" | | 3:51 |
| B3 | "In A Spotlight" | | 4:15 |
| B4 | "Lost At Love" | | 3:42 |
| B5 | "Your Tears Don't Lie" | | 3:33 |

== Personnel ==
Adapted from AllMusic.

- Michael Baird – drums
- Ben Benay – guitar
- Rosemary Butler – vocals, background vocals
- Dan Dugmore – steel guitar, Lap steel guitar, Pedal steel guitar
- Venetta Fields – vocals, background vocals
- Mike Finnigan – vocals, background vocals
- Bob Glaub – bass
- Jay Graydon – guitar
- Max Gronenthal – vocals, background vocals
- Jim Horn – flute
- Nat Jeffrey – composer, producer
- Steve Lukather – guitar
- Gary Mallaber – drums
- David Paich – keyboards, piano
- David Piet – bass
- Jeff Porcaro – drums
- Bryan Savage – saxophone
- William D. "Smitty" Smith – clavinet, Fender Rhodes, keyboards, piano, background vocals, Wurlitzer
- Glen Spreen – ARP synthesizer, bass, keyboards, Moog bass, Moog synthesizer, organ, piano, Wurlitzer
- Marc Tanner – guitar, background vocals
- Joe Turano – vocals, background vocals
- Tommy Vig – percussion
- Richie Zito – guitar

== Release history ==
Versions released (US)
| Title | Release info | Year | Format |
|---|---|---|---|
| No Escape | Elektra 6E-168 | 1979 | LP |
| No Escape | Elektra TC-5168 | 1979 | Cassette |
| No Escape | Elektra ET-8168 | 1979 | 8 Track |
| No Escape | Wounded Bird Records WOU 168 | 2006 | CD |
