= The Three Playmates =

American R&B trio

- Origin: Newark, New Jersey, U.S.
- Genres: Rhythm and blues
- Years active: 1957–1958
- Label: Savoy
- Past members: Lucille Beatty; Alma Beatty; Gwen Brooks a.k.a. Dianne Brooks

The Three Playmates were a female R&B trio from Newark, New Jersey who were active in the late 1950s. They recorded for the Savoy label, and had three singles released. One of them, the dance oriented "Sugah Wooga", became a hit for the trio in 1958.

== Background ==
The group was made up of sisters, Lucille and Alma Beatty and Gwen Brooks a.k.a. Dianne Brooks. Their first release was credited to The Playmates (Gwen, Lucille, Alma). Later as The Three Playmates, they had a hit with "Sugah Wooga" in late 1958.

Some of the venues they performed at included New York's Apollo Theater and Washington's Howard Theater. They also appeared on the same bill as Betty Carter, the Cadillacs, the El Doradoes, the Dells, Jackie Wilson and Dinah Washington.

== Career ==
They recorded "It Must Be Love" and "Giddy-Up-A-Ding Dong" with backing by George Barrow and Jerome Richardson on tenor sax; Budd Johnson on baritone sax, Sam Price on piano, Kenny Burrell on guitar, Joe Benjamin on bass, and Bobby Donaldson on drums. These two songs came out on their first single the trio had released on Savoy 45–1523. It was credited to The Playmates (Gwen, Lucille, Alma).

Their single "Sugah Wooga" bw "Lovey Dovey Pair" was recorded with backup from musicians that included Buddy Lucas on tenor sax, Bobby Banks on organ, Leonard Gaskin on bass. It was released on Savoy 1528. The review of their single in Billboard December 16, 1957 issue was positive, noting the clever use of voices on the A side. The B side was a "tender" ballad about adolescent love. The single peaked at #89 on March 10, 1958.

By May 1958, their single with "I Dreamed" and "Give Your Love to Me" was out. The track "I Dreamed" had a fair review. It was noted that "Give Your Love to Me" had a Latin feel to it. However, it didn't get anywhere on the charts.

The ending of the group was Alma Beatty's pregnancy. When their manager learnt of this he discontinued his association with them as took their stage costumes. Their relationship with their label also deteriorated.

== Discography ==
Singles
Act	Release	Catalogue	Year	Notes #
The Playmates (Gwen, Lucille, Alma)	"It Must Be Love" / "Giddy-Up-A-Ding-Dong"	Savoy 45-1523	1957	
The Three Playmates	"Sugah Wooga" / "Lovey Dovey Pair"	Savoy 45-1528	1957/1958?	
The Three Playmates	"Give Your Love to Me" / "(Do-oo, Do-oo) I Dreamed"	Savoy 45-1537	1957/1958?	
