= Hands of the Clock =

Song by Life
- B-side: "Ain't I Told You Before"
- Released: 1969
- Label: Polydor
- Songwriter: Neil Sheppard
- Producer: Neil Sheppard

Life singles chronology
"Hands of the Clock" (1969)	"Sweet Lovin'" (1969)

"Hands of the Clock" was a hit for Canadian band Life in 1969. It was written and produced by Neil Sheppard.

== Background ==
The group's debut single, "Hands of the Clock" bw "Ain't I Told You Before" was released on Polydor 540.009 in 1969. Both sides were written by Neil Sheppard. With a strong response to the single in the United States, it was noted in the September, 1969 issue of Billboard that it would be released in England on Polydor.

== Charts ==
The single was in the Recommended Canadian Content section of RPM Weekly on May 26. It was also picking up in Montreal and Ontario. By June 9 it was charting, having just entered the Canadian Content Chart at #9. It also made its entry into the RPM100 Chart at the #100 spot. By July 14, the group appeared on the RPM Weekly cover. Their single was also at its second week at #4 on the RPM Canadian Content Chart. It had also moved up from #48 to #43 on the RPM100 Chart.

Stateside it was making some progress and Billboard wrote in the August 2 issue that "Hands of the Clock" by Life, "Laughing" by The Guess Who and "When I Die" by Motherlode were three Canadian produced singles that were either in the Billboard "Hot Hundred" or "Bubbling Under".

The song eventually got to #19 on Canada's RPM chart.
