= Motherlode (band) =

Canadian pop rock group

- Origin: London, Ontario, Canada
- Genres: Soul, rock, R&B
- Years active: 1969–1970, 1976, 1989–1990
- Labels: Buddah, Revolver, Unidisc
- Past members: VERSION 1 William "Smitty" Smith; Steve Kennedy; Ken Marco; Wayne "Stoney" Stone VERSION 2 William "Smitty" Smith; Doug Richardson; Anthony Shinault; Philip Wilson; VERSION 3 Wally Cameron; Newton Garwood; Breen LeBoeuf; Mike Levine; Gord Waszek; VERSION 4 Wally Cameron; Newton Garwood; Mike Levine; Kieran Overs; Wayne St. John VERSION 5 Dave Berman; Brian Dewhurst; Gerry Legault; Joey Roberts aka Joey Miquelon; Brian Wray

Motherlode was a Canadian pop rock group formed in 1969 in London, Ontario. The group scored some success in the US with their single, "When I Die", which hit #1 in Canada and #18 on the U.S. Billboard Hot 100 chart in 1969. The group did not have a bass guitarist. William Smith would play the bass notes on his keyboard. They did however use bass players on their studio recordings.

The act remains a one-hit wonder despite two more singles in the top 100 in Canada.

== Biography ==
=== Early years ===
The first connection can be traced back to the Blue Note club on February 22, 1964, where the club's house band, The Silhouettes were playing. Steve Kennedy was a member of the band and in a relationship with the female singer, Dianne Brooks. Doug Riley was also in the group. This is where William "Smitty" Smith first met Kennedy. Smith was working at The Flamingo which was a club down the road. Getting on well with each other straight away, they kept in touch. They had a plan to put together a group to play behind Brooks and they eventually did.

In 1966, The Soul Searchers were formed. The correct name for the group was Diane Brooks, Eric Mercury and The Soul Searchers. The instrumental part of the group consisted of Eric "Mouse" Johnson on drums and vocals, Steve Kennedy on tenor, baritone sax and background vocals, Terry Logan on guitar and vocals, and William "Smitty" Smith on Hammond B3 organ and vocals. Their first gig the group played was at the Memory Lane in Toronto.

Steve Kennedy left the band and his replacement was saxophonist Glen McDonnell. Some time later, and following the break up of the Soul Searchers, William Smith went via the same direction as Kennedy and joined Grant Smith and The Power, a group which David Clayton Thomas had been a member of. Kennedy had officially become a member of Grant Smith and The Power in April 1968 and Smith came in to the group in September. They played on the group's debut album, Keep On Running which was released on Boo BST 6802 around October–November 1968. Among the musicians on the album were Wayne Stone on drums and Kenny Marco on guitar. Some things Smith, Kennedy, Marco and Stone weren't happy about was that they were playing mostly covers. And they were disappointed with the lack of the album's success.

=== Motherlode formed ===
Smith, Kennedy and co. formed Motherlode in 1969 and relocated to London, Ontario, where they struggled and stayed with friends. They finally got a break following their debut at the Image Club when Mort Ross signed them to Revolver Records that same year. According to Ritchie Yorke's book, Axes, Chops & Hot Licks: The Canadian Rock Music Scene, they got about 25 songs together and cut some of them in the studio.

Their first single, "When I Die" that was produced by Doug Riley and Terry Brown did not make any headway on the radio. A reciprocal deal in the US with Buddah Records made the song a hit reaching Number 18 on the charts. The song sold more than 500,000 copies and it eventually climbed to Number 1 in the Canadian charts.

Dianne Brooks contributed a song "Memories of a Broken Promise" as well as some background vocals to Motherlode's When I Die album. Motherlode also contributed a song and instrumental backing on Brooks album, Another Kind Of Soul that was released on Revolver Records. The bass guitar work and some acoustic guitar was handled by L.A. session-woman Carol Kaye. Just one track had Dave Young on bass.

Motherlode was booked to appear at the "Freak Out" festival. A 72-hour event that ran on the Labor Day period from August 29 to September 1, held at Rock Hill, 16 miles north of Orangeville. Other acts booked to appear were The Brass Union, Brutus, Lighthouse, Life, The Guess Who, and Buckstone Hardware etc.

=== Break up and personnel changes ===
The group broke up in December 1969, their second album, Tapped Out which had already been recorded, previously was released posthumously only in the United States. Steve Kennedy, Ken Marco and Wayne Stone went on to be members of Dr. Music in Toronto, Ontario, Canada. The album contained the song "Black Cat", which was sampled by Gang Starr's "Daily Operation" (intro).

2nd version

As Revolver Records owned the name Motherlode, it decided to reform the group, keeping William Smith making this the second version of the group. This new Motherlode was formed with Smith and three new musicians, all black! This line-up consisted of Doug Richardson (saxophone), Anthony Shinault (guitar) and Philip Wilson (drums). It was reported by RPM Weekly in the July 11 issue that Mort Ross was producing new recordings for Motherlode and Chimo!. Also at that time, their single "Dear Old Daddy Bill" was at #20 in the Top 50 Canadian MAPL Chart.

It was reported by Billboard in its July 18, 1970, issue that their new single, "I'm So Glad You're You (And Not Me)" bw "Whipoorwill" which was produced by Mort Ross was scheduled for immediate release, with the Canadian release to be on Revolver and the United States release to be on Buddha. Released on Revolver REVS-008, the A side was composed by William Smith and Phyllis Gorman. The B side was composed by Anthony Shinault. For the week ending September 13, the single entered the Top 50 MAPL Canadian chart at #50. It reached its highest position at #33 on October 17 and held it for another week. By the 31st, RPM Weekly had changed the chart to the Top 30 Canadian MAPL Chart, making it drop off the chart. It was now in the Recommended Canadian Singles list. Their new single flopped in the US.

This line up stayed together for around seven months.

3rd and 4th versions

Mort Ross, Revolver Record's president had brought in Gord Waszek, of the rock group Leigh Ashford, to begin writing for the third version of Motherlode. They recorded "All That's Necessary", with Breen LeBoeuf on vocals, Mike Levine on bass plus Gord Waszek and several other members of Leigh Ashford. The B-side of this single was "My Chant" which was just a renamed version of "Hiro Smothek" from 1970's Tapped Out.

It was reported by RPM Weekly in their December 5, 1970, issue that Motherlode had reformed for recording with the previous line up having failed to capitalize on the success of "When I Die". The group was now under the leadership of Mike Levine. The line up consisted of Mike Levine (bass), Wayne St. John (vocals), Kieran Overs (guitar) and two former members of Leigh Ashford, Wally Cameron (drums) and Newton Garwood (keyboards). According to the December 5 article, there was still a high amount of American interest in the band. The group was working in Sudbury and Thunder Bay and later they moved to Western Ontario. Reactions to the group were said to be excellent. Along with Jam Jar, and Chimo!, Motherlode had been signed to the R.A.M. and Concept 376 agencies for Canadian representation. The record flopped and this 4th version that was assembled to promote the record broke up.

5th version

By March 1971, a fifth version of Motherlode was created from the remnants of Natural Gas, a Montreal-based group. The members were Dave Berman (saxophone), Brian Dewhurst (drums), Gerry Legault (bass, vocals), Joey Roberts aka Joey Miquelon (guitar), and Brian Wray (keyboards). They never managed to recording anything, and became part of Truck with the addition of Graham Lear.

== Later years ==
The original Motherlode members reunited in 1976, and recorded a song "Happy People" but, because of issues surrounding the name Motherlode, it had to be released as a Kenny Marco solo release. In November 1989, they used the name Motherlode for a reunion during a week of live performances at the Bluenote club in Toronto. In 1990 they recorded eight new songs, but those sessions have remained unreleased. Also in 1990, RPM Weekly mentioned William Smith and Motherlode as artists to appear in CBC Television's Supathon '90 13 hour long show, scheduled to begin on 24 February.

Breen LeBoeuf eventually relocated to Montreal in 1978 to join Offenbach. He later recorded three solo albums and did a two-year stint with Celine Dion as bassist/background vocalist, before joining Canadian rockers April Wine in January 2007, replacing Jim Clench on bass.

Kennedy later joined the Canadian band Lighthouse. He first performed with Lighthouse in 1982 at the One Fine Weekend Ontario Place reunion.

Smith became a session musician and played on and contributed background vocals to recordings by artists such as Eric Mercury on his Funky Sounds Nurtured In The Fertile Soil album, Mark Tanner on his No Escape album, and Rickie Lee Jones on her Flying Cowboys album. He also released a solo album Smitty, which included a song "Sweetie Pie" that he co-wrote with Eric Mercury. He died in 1997, aged 53, of a heart attack.

Newton Garwood left professional music in the mid-1970s, choosing instead to become a Toronto manager at Long & McQuade music instrument retailers. Garwood died of cancer in 2005.

== Personnel ==
Original members

- Steve Kennedy – saxophone, harmonica, vocals
- Ken Marco – guitar, vocals
- William "Smitty" Smith – keyboards, vocals
- Wayne Stone – drums

Guest musicians

- Dianne Brooks - background vocals
- Carol Kaye - bass, acoustic guitar
- Dave Young - bass
- Paul "Mickey" Callum - congas
- Andy Cree - percussion

Later members

- Doug Richardson - saxophone - replaced Steve Kennedy 1970
- Anthony Shinault - Guitar- replaced Ken Marco 1970
- Philip Wilson - drums - replaced Wayne Stoney Stone 1970
- Wally Cameron - drums - replaced Philip Wilson 1971
- Newton Garwood - keyboards - Replaced William Smitty Smith 1971
- Gord Waszek - guitar - replaced Anthony Shinault 1971
- Dave Berman - saxophone
- Brian Dewhurst - drums
- Breen LeBoeuf - Vocals
- Gerry Legault - Bass, Vocals
- Mike Levine - Bass
- Kieran Overs - guitar
- Joey Roberts (Miquelon) - Guitar
- Wayne St. John - Vocals
- Brian Wray - Keyboards

== Discography Canada ==
Canadian singles
Act	Release	Catalogue	Year	Notes #
Motherlode	"When I Die" / "Hard Life"	Revolver REVS 002	1969	(#1 RPM CAN) (#5 CHUM CAN)
Motherlode	"Memories Of A Broken Promise" / "What Does It Take"	Revolver/Apex REVS 004	1969	(#25 CAN CHUM) (#40 CAN RPM)
Motherlode	"Dear Old Daddy Bill" / "Living Life"	Revolver REVS 005	1970	(#69 CAN)
Motherlode	"I'm So Glad You're You (And Not Me)" / "Whipoorwill"	Revolver REVS 008	1970	
Motherlode	"All That's Necessary" / "Chant"	Revolver 75-1046 (REVS 011)	1971	
Kenny Marco	"Happy People" / "Happy People (Instrumental)"	Quality 2197X	1976	Motherlode single but due to legal complications released under Kenny Marco's name

Canadian albums
Act	Release	Catalogue	Year	Notes #
Motherlode	When I Die	Revolver RLPS 501	1969	
Motherlode	Tapped Out	Unidisc UBK-4198	2018	CD reissue

Canadian compilations
Act	Release	Catalogue	Year	Notes #
Motherlode	When I Die/Tapped Out	Pacemaker Entertainment Limited PACE-007	1994	[2-fer-1 CD re-issue]
Motherlode	The Best Of / When I Die	Unidisc AGEK-2246	2008	

== Discography USA ==
US singles
Act	Release	Catalogue	Year	Notes #
Motherlode	"When I Die" / "Hard Life"	Buddah BDA 131	1969	
Motherlode	"Memories Of A Broken Promise" / "What Does It Take"	Buddha BDA 144	1969	
Motherlode	"I'm So Glad You're You And Not Me" / "Whippoorwill"	Buddah BDA 185	1970	
Jim Weatherly / Motherlode	"The Need To Me" / "When I Die"	Collectables B 3535; Back To Back Hit Series		
Motherlode	"When I Die" / "Hard Life"	Radio Active Gold RD-18		

US EP
Act	Release	Catalogue	Year	Notes #
Motherlode	A1. "Dear Old Daddy Bill" A2. "Memories Of A Broken Promise"; B1. "Oh! See The White Light" B2."You Ain't Lookin' In The Right Place Baby"	Buddah Records SP 11	1969	Promo

US albums
Act	Release	Catalogue	Year	Notes #
Motherlode	When I Die	Buddah Records BDS 5046	1969	No. 93 in the US
Motherlode	Tapped Out	Buddah Records BDS 5108	1970	
