= Sugah Wooga =

Single by The Three Playmates
- B-side: "Lovey Dovey Pair"
- Released: 1957
- Genre: R&B
- Length: 2:45
- Label: Savoy 45-1528
- Songwriters: Brooks, Cadena

The Three Playmates singles chronology
"It Must Be Love" (1957)	"Sugah Wooga" (1957)	"Give Your Love To Me" (1958)

"Sugah Wooga" was a chart hit for R&B female trio the Three Playmates in 1958. It was their only hit.

== Background ==
The female trio was from Newark, New Jersey, and consisted of the Beatty sisters, Lucille and Alma and Gwen Brooks. The song they recorded was a dance song.

The single, backed with "Lovey Dovey Pair", was recorded with backup from musicians that included Buddy Lucas on tenor sax, Bobby Banks on organ, and Leonard Gaskin on bass. It was written by Brooks and Ozzie Cadena. It was released on Savoy 1528.

== Reception ==
The review of their single in Billboard December 16, 1957 issue was positive, referring to the songs as powerful entries and noting the clever use of voices on the A side. The B side was a "tender" ballad about adolescent love.

== Chart performance ==
The single did very well in some cities, hitting the number-one spot. By December 30, it was noted as a hit and selling fast, with momentum continuing in February 1958. The single peaked nationally at #89 on March 10, 1958.
