= Georgette Fry =

Canadian blues singer (born 1953)

Georgette Fry (born 9 September 1953) is a Canadian blues singer, songwriter and choir director. Her first solo album, Rites of Passage (1995), earned a Juno nomination for Best Blues/Gospel Album. She won the CBC's Saturday Night Blues Great Canadian Blues Award for the year's best Canadian blues musician in 2006. For her work as the founding director of Shout Sister Choir, a network of choirs open to all women who love to sing, she was awarded the Governor General's Meritorious Service Medal in 2017.

== Early life ==
Fry was born in Saint-Jérôme, Quebec, to a Canadian Armed Forces family. As she was growing up, her family moved every few years to new military postings, which included Lahr, Germany, Metz, France, and Ottawa, Ontario.

In an interview with the Kingston Whig Standard, Fry recalled her first encounter with a professional woman singer as probably one of her “most vivid childhood memories.” She was about age four, living in France, when her parents took the family to the circus: “I was having a great time watching the animals when this woman came out,” sat down at a grand piano and started to sing. Fry was so riveted by the performance that her parents had to “pry [her] out of her seat” when it ended. She started listening to the radio “around the clock” and singing along; she purchased her first guitar at age ten. During high school years, in Ottawa, Ontario, Fry and other students who wanted to make music were encouraged by a teacher who let them jam in his classroom after school.

Fry moved from Ottawa to Kingston, Ontario, in 1975.

== Career ==
In Kingston, Ontario, in 1976, band leader Bill Joslin discovered Georgette Fry singing at an open mic event. They began to perform as “Joslin and Fry” and shared the lead vocals on Late Datin’, the vinyl LP they recorded at Comfort Sound studio in Toronto in 1984.

From 1987 to 1994, Fry lived in London, Ontario, where she collaborated with local musicians, with two of them forming the acoustic blues trio One Flight Up. One Flight Up played in London clubs and on the blues festival circuit, including Harbourfront, in the early 1990s.

When the City of London, Ontario, which is nicknamed the Forest City, established its Forest City London Music Hall of Fame in 2003, Fry was among its six inaugural inductees.

In 1994, Fry received an Ontario Arts Council grant to record music. She moved back to Kingston to work on her first solo album. That album, Rites of Passage, was released in August 1995. Tom Schneider reported on its success in Toronto Maple Blues Society report: “Her debut CD, Rites of Passage, which was produced with the help of many close musician/friends, . . . has been met with excellent reviews, extensive radio play, burgeoning sales, and a Juno nomination in the Blues & Gospel category for 1995.” Schneider, in the same article, discussed whether the eclecticism of Fry’s musical influences would affect her career in an industry that brands music and musicians by genre. He concluded, “The public, the press, and the music industry consistently remark that they hear country, jazz, rock, and pop in the songs she both writes and covers but everyone agrees that it’s all coming from a voice which starts from a whiskey-and-cigarettes centre, while each piece is draped in a patina which is unmistakably bluesy.” On the website The Band, Fry offered her own view of the music on her first CD: “Ask me to pick a musical pigeonhole and I'll tell you my home is in the one marked ‘The Blues’. The thing about pigeonholes, though, is that (unless you've got the wrong end sticking out of it) you're bound to notice that you're surrounded by a lot of other pigeonholes that look like interesting places to visit. Gregarious bird that I am, I've left home more than a few times and have brought back some interesting pieces with which to feather my nest.”

In 1996-1997, Fry toured in Canada (Alberta, BC and the Maritimes) and South Africa, with musicians Gerry (Dirt) Clancy, on drums, Zak Colbert, bass, Dean Harrison, keyboards, and Pete Pereira, tenor sax. The CBC recorded her live performance in Calgary, Alberta, on May 30, 1996, and released her second album, Georgette Live, in 1997.

In 1998, Fry shared the Saturday night main stage of the Ottawa Folk Festival with Ferron, Roy Forbes and Connie Kaldor, among others. Delivering “a rousing closing set,” Fry “ably demonstrated why she was awarded Jazz Report Magazine’s Blues Artist of the Year award [1997].” Fry also received the Annual Real Blues Award for Best Blues Vocalist (Female) in 1997 and 1998.

When not touring, Fry was singing regularly on Thursday nights at Brandees, a large bar in downtown Kingston. This weekly gig with her B-Side Blues Band—Gerry (Dirt) Clancy, drums, Zak Colbert, bass, Jim Preston (d. 2005), guitar, and Cam Schaeffer, keyboards—lasted more than twenty years, from 1995 to 2008.

From the early 1990s to 2000, Georgette Fry also played with Grant Heckman and Bob Robertson in a folk-rock-jazz-blues-indie trio, fittingly called Eclectricity. The three members traded lead vocals and each contributed original songs, playing together until Grant Heckman left Ontario for his home province of New Brunswick. They recorded one album, Eclectricity, in 1998.

In 2002, Fry released her third solo album, Let Me Drive, earning three Annual Real Blues Awards: Best Canadian Blues Vocalist (Female), Best Blues Songwriter, and Best Blues Release. The album includes seven original songs, among them "Let Me Drive."

St. Lawrence College, in Kingston, Ontario, conferred an honorary diploma on Fry in 2002.

Fry is included on the Maple Blues Society retrospective compilation album of great Canadian female blues singers, Women’s Blues Revue Live, and the CBC compilation album, Saturday Night Blues – 20 Years, both released in 2006.

Fry's fourth solo album, Back in a Moment (2007), is a collection of American jazz standards, with Canadian additions "A Case of You", by Joni Mitchell, and "Gifted Hands", by Paul McKay.

== Shout Sister Choir ==
In September 2002, Fry started an open choir for women: “[B]ecause of her conviction that one does not need to have an education in music to reap the physical and psychological benefits of singing, Georgette designed and implemented a non-reading, non-auditioning "pop" choir (Shout Sister!) [known as That Choir until 2005], specifically aimed at women whose so-called musical limitations may have robbed them of prior opportunities to sing in a group setting.” It was the movie Sister Act, starring Whoopi Goldberg, that kindled Fry’s interest in starting a choir. However, since Fry doesn’t read music, she thought directing a choir was out of the question. One of her vocal students disagreed, pointing out that Fry had been teaching voice for years and could teach a group using similar methods. Since then, Fry has created and recorded more than 170 choral arrangements for Shout Sister Choir, ranging across the genres of pop, Motown, folk, country and blues. Shout Sister Choir grew from the three choirs Fry started in Kingston (2002), Brockville and Picton, Ontario (2006) to a network of choirs across the province. At its apex, before the Covid pandemic of 2020-21, Shout Sister comprised 1400 members in 25 chapters, led by 12 different directors.

In 2008, Fry received a Quinte Arts Council Award for bringing Shout Sister Choir to Picton, Ontario. In 2016, Fry was awarded the Governor General’s Meritorious Service Medal for her work with the choir. In 2016, she also received the Queen’s University Ban Righ Foundation Community Leadership Award for “her vision of inclusive vocal music” and for creating female choirs that are “in themselves communities, bringing succour, support and strength to members." In 2017, the City of Kingston named Fry the winner of the 2017 First Capital Honourable Achievement Award, an award for Kingstonians who consistently contribute to the overall quality of life in the community. Her nomination notes that Shout Sister Choir benefits not only its own members but also those in need in the community, by making visits to retirement homes and doing fundraising concerts for charitable causes.

In 2025, Shout Sister comprises eight choirs, with those in Kingston, Brockville, Belleville and Picton led by Fry herself. The London Shout Sister Choir, under the direction of Leanne Mayer, won the 2025 Forest City London Music Award for Classical Vocal (Choir/Group).

== Return to the stage ==
In 2013, Fry “returned from semi-retirement [as a singer] to perform a spectacular tribute” to Etta James, called At Last! Georgette Sings Etta. Etta James (d. 2012) was a singer Fry had long admired. “'Etta James, for me, was this big-voiced woman with an attitude that I loved, so I just decided I would learn just as much as I could from her singing style,' said Fry, who first heard James on the transistor radio hanging from her bed post." In the tribute show she created, Fry delivered a "big and amazing sound," backed by an eight-piece band, led by saxophonist Jonathon (Bunny) Stewart, back-up singers, including Anne Sudac and Tabby Johnson, and Shout Sister Choir. The sold out premiere performance at the Grand Theatre in Kingston on 20 June 2013 was recorded by Josh Lyons. The show toured three more cities and returned to the Grand Theatre in 2016.

The Calgary Blues Music Association named Fry "Singer of the Year" in 2013.

On 9 September 2023, Fry celebrated her seventieth birthday by performing in Joel Stone Park, on the waterfront of Gananoque, Ontario. This concert was a reunion and a retrospective, with family, friends and longtime fans in attendance and many of the musicians Fry had played with over the decades, joining her on stage.

In 2025, Fry has been performing with Georgette Fry & Friends in small theatres in Kingston and the surrounding region. Her band members are Zak Colbert (bass), Ken Hall (keyboards), Duncan Holt (drums), Ian Kojima (tenor sax), Tom Leighton (piano, accordion), Matt Ray (guitar) and Anna Sudac (vocals).

== Awards ==
- Jazz Report Blues Musician of the Year, 1997
- Annual Real Blues Awards:
  - Best Canadian Blues Vocalist (Female), 1997. 1998, 2002
  - Best Blues Songwriter, 2002
  - Best Blues Release of 2002
- St. Lawrence College, Honorary Diploma, 2002
- Forest City London Music Hall of Fame Inductee, 2003
- CBC Saturday Night Blues Award for Best Blues Musician, 2006
- Quinte Arts Council Arts Recognition Award, 2008
- Calgary Blues Music Association Blues Awards, Singer of the Year, 2013
- Queen’s University Ban Righ Foundation Community Leadership Award, 2016
- Governor General’s Meritorious Service Medal, 2016, invested 2017
- City of Kingston First Capital Honourable Achievement Award, 2017

== Discography ==
- Late Datin’ (with Bill Joslin), 1984
- Rites of Passage, 1995
- Georgette Live, 1997
- Eclectricity (with Grant Heckman and Bob Robertson), 1998
- Let Me Drive, 2002
- Back in a Moment, 2007
