= William "Smitty" Smith =

Canadian musician (1944–1997)

William Smith
- Born: William Daniel Smith
- Origin: Canada
- Genres: Rock; soul; jazz
- Occupation: Musician
- Instruments: Vocals; keyboards
- Years active: 1960s–1980s
- Formerly of: Motherlode; Diane Brooks & The Soul Searchers; Eric Mercury; Grant Smith & The Power; Blood Sweat & Tears; David Clayton Thomas; Mike Finnigan & The Right Band, David Lindley & El Rayo-X

William Daniel "Smitty" Smith (August 30, 1944 – November 28, 1997) was a Canadian keyboardist and session musician.

== Background ==
Smith had been playing together with Steve Kennedy, Eric Mercury, Eric "Mouse" Johnson, Terry Logan, and Diane Brooks in a Toronto band called the Soul Searchers that was fronted by Mercury and Brooks. After the Soul Searchers broke up, first Kennedy and then Smith joined a group called Grant Smith & The Power. In 1969, Smith and Kennedy, along with Ken Marco and Wayne "Stoney" Stone, formed Motherlode and went on to have a U.S. #18 hit with "When I Die." The group broke up in 1970 and Smith fronted a second version of Motherlode that was soon to break up after releasing one single.

Smith became a session musician and played on and contributed background vocals to recordings by artists such as Bob Dylan, David Clayton-Thomas, Billy Joel, The Pointer Sisters, Bonnie Raitt, Linda Ronstadt, Etta James, Blood, Sweat and Tears, Richie Havens, Tracy Chapman, Rod Stewart, Bruce Willis, and Brenda Russell. He also played with Eric Mercury on his Funky Sounds Nurtured in the Fertile Soil album, Marc Tanner Band on their No Escape album, Ricky Lee Jones on her Flying Cowboys album, among others. He also released a solo album Smitty which included a song, "Sweetie Pie", that he co-wrote with Eric Mercury. In the early 1980s, Smith played keyboards and background vocals in Mike Finnigan and The Right Band.

== Early years ==
Smith happened to be at the Blue Note club on February 22, 1964, where the club's house band, The Silhouettes, were playing. Steve Kennedy was a member of the band and in a relationship with the female singer, Dianne Brooks. Doug Riley was also in the group. This is where Smith first met Kennedy. Smith was working at The Flamingo, which was a club down the road. Getting on well with each other straight away, they kept in touch. They had an idea to put together a group to play behind Brooks and they eventually did. He became part of the instrumental section of The Soul Searchers, aka Diane Brooks, Eric Mercury and the Soul Searchers, playing Hammond B3 organ and vocals. Other members were Eric "Mouse" Johnson on drums and vocals, Steve Kennedy on tenor, baritone sax and background vocals, Terry Logan on guitar and vocals. Their first gig was at the Memory Lane in Toronto.

== Illness and death ==
He suffered a stroke on January 1, 1992. He died in 1997, aged 53, of a heart attack.

== Discography ==
As leader/co-leader (William D. Smith)

- A Good Feelin' – Warner Bros – BS 2911 – 1976
- Smitty - A&M SP-4693 - 1978

As sideman

- 1975: See How The Years Have Gone By – Valdy (A&M Records SP-4538)
- 1976: Some People Can Do What They Like – Robert Palmer (Island Records ILPS 9420)
- 1986: Crossroads – Original Motion Picture Soundtrack – Ry Cooder (Warner Bros. Records 25399-2)
