= One More Mountain to Climb (Neil Sedaka song) =

Single by Dr. Music

from the album Dr. Music
- B-side: "I Can Hear Her Calling Him"
- Released: 1971
- Genre: Pop rock, Judeo-Christian rock
- Length: 2:40
- Label: GRT 1233
- Songwriters: Neil Sedaka, Howard Greenfield
- Producer: Doug Riley

Dr. Music singles chronology
"Try a Little Harder" (1971)	"One More Mountain to Climb" (1971)	"Sun Goes By" (1971)

"One More Mountain to Climb" is a song written by Neil Sedaka and Howard Greenfield, originally released by Sedaka on his album Emergence in 1971.

Two hit records came from cover versions of the song, one in Canada and the other in New Zealand, both of which hit #14 in their respective country's chart in 1971. The Canadian hit was recorded and released by Dr. Music. The song was featured on their 1971 album, Dr. Music. Dr. Music's recording of the song was produced and arranged by Doug Riley. The New Zealand hit was recorded and released by Craig Scott.

It is not to be confused with the Ronnie Dove song, which reached #45 on the Billboard Hot 100 in 1967.

== Other versions ==
- Skylark released a version of the song on their 1974 album, 2.
- David Soul released a version of the song on his 1976 album, David Soul.
