= B.T. Puppy Records =

American record label

B.T. Puppy Records was an American record label formed in New York City in 1963 by Bright Tunes Productions, a music publishing and production company established by vocal group The Tokens.

== Background ==
Initially set up to release the Tokens' own recordings, it had its greatest successes with another vocal group, The Happenings, whose hits included "See You in September" (1966) and "I Got Rhythm" (1967). Other musicians who recorded for the label included Beverly Warren, Lollipop Tree, and The Del-Satins. The label continued to release singles until 1970, and albums until 1972.

== History ==
In 1969, Canadian group The Scene had a top 20 hit on the Canadian charts with "Hands of the Clock".
