= Chimo! =

Canadian jazz-rock/jazz fusion band

- Origin: Canada
- Genres: Rock
- Years active: 1969–1971
- Labels: Revolver
- Past members: Pat Little; Andy Cree; Breen LeBoeuf; Jack Mowbray; Stewart McCann; Tony Collacott; Ross Raby; Rick King; John Johnson

Chimo! (Inuit for "Hello") was a Canadian jazz-rock/jazz fusion band, founded in 1969. The band played with some of the biggest acts of their era, and recorded one album, Cross Country Man for Revolver Records.

== History ==
Chimo! evolved from Georgian IV, a band formed in Parry Sound in 1962 by John Johnson, Ross Raby, Stewart McCann and Rick King. After seven years of increasing success the band saw major personnel changes and, in 1969, changed its name to Chimo!, with the original line-up of Jack Mowbray (guitar), Tony Collacott (keyboards), Ross Raby (keyboards, vocals), John Johnson (guitar), Andy Cree (drums), and Breen La Boeuf (lead vocals).

Also in 1969, the band played alongside Chicago at the Toronto Rock and Roll Revival and, on June 28, 1970, opened the second day of the Festival Express with The Band and Janis Joplin at the Canadian National Exhibition Stadium. They also appeared at the Midsummer Night Rock Festival at Michigan State Fairgrounds Coliseum with Alice Cooper, The Poor Souls, Iggy & The Stooges, and others.

Following the release of the band's album Cross Country Man in November 1970, Andy Cree left to do sessions for David Wiffen before joining Anne Murray's band. He was replaced by Pat Little, who had previously been with Luke & The Apostles, and had been doing session work for Van Morrison and Peter, Paul & Mary. The new line-up was responsible for two singles, Little's "In The Sea" and Mowbray's "Cross Country Man".

In 1971, Raby, Johnson and Collacott left the band to start families (save for Collacott, who would have no children). Little joined the band Heaven and Earth, and then founded the band Flag. LeBoeuf joined a re-formed Motherlode and, in 1977, Offenbach.

== Personnel ==
- Breen LeBoeuf: vocals
- Ross Raby: organ, vocals
- Jack Mowbray: guitars, vocals
- John Johnson: bass, vocals
- Andy Cree: drums, percussion
- Pat Little: drums, percussion
- Tony Collacott: piano

== Recordings ==
Singles
Act	Song title	Catalogue info	Year	Notes #
Chimo!	"Quicksilver Woman" / "Day After Day"	Revolver 006	1969	
Chimo!	"Silken Silver Melody" / "Lonely Girl"	Revolver 009	1970	
Chimo!	"In The Sea" / "Cross Country Man"	Revolver 1070	1971	

Albums
Act	Song title	Catalogue info	Year	Notes #
Chimo	Chimo!	Revolver 503	1970	

== Sources ==
- "1,500 rock groups in search of smash records", Toronto Telegram, September 17, 1970, page 33
- Bill Munson's sleeve for Chimo! CD on Pacemaker
- Interview with Breen LeBoeuf, 2004 I love Chimo!
