= Steve Kennedy (musician) =

- Occupation: Musician
- Instrument: Saxophone
- Years active: 1960s to present
- Formerly of: The Regents, The Silhouettes, The Soul Searchers, Grant Smith and The Power, Motherlode, Dr. Music, Lighthouse, Blood, Sweat And Tears

Steve Kennedy is a Canadian based musician who co-wrote the hit song "When I Die" which was a hit for Motherlode in 1969. He is also notable for being a member of prominent historical Canadian groups such as The Soul Searchers, Dr. Music, Lighthouse, and Grant Smith & The Power. He was also a member of Blood, Sweat And Tears.

== Background ==
Kennedy and Diane Brooks had been part of The Silhouettes who were a well established r&b group on the Toronto music scene. This group had actually backed Eric Mercury on his single, "I Wondered Why" / "Softly", which was released on the Clip label, catalogue no. 1122 in 1966. That year Kennedy left the group to form the instrumental core of The Soul Searchers with William Smith, guitarist Terry Logan, and drummer Eric "Mouse" Johnson, backing Eric Mercury and Diane Brooks. After some time Kennedy left The Soul Searchers and was replaced by saxophonist Glen McDonnell. When The Soul Searchers finally broke up, William Smith followed Kennedy's direction and joined the group Grant Smith and The Power of which David Clayton Thomas was a member.

In 1969, Smith and Kennedy formed Motherlode. Together with Smith, Kennedy wrote "When I Die" which got to No. 1 in Canada and Top 20 on the U.S. charts.

Kennedy also wrote the hit "Sun Goes By" which spent 9 weeks on Vancouver’s CKVN chart, peaking at no. 12 in August, 1972.

He was a member of Blood Sweat & Tears in 1979.

== Early career ==
=== The Regents ===
In the late 1950s, Kennedy was working for Bache and Co. where he would on occasion answer calls from Peter Groschel who worked in the stock brokerage business. Groshel would call the company where Kennedy worked when there were international buy-and-sell orders. After talking to each other for a period of time and discovering Kennedy played saxophone, they decided to form a band. The line up consisted of Brian Massey on bass, Tommy Goodings on guitar, Kennedy on saxophone and Groschel on drums. Some time later they added Kay Taylor to vocally front the band. They were invited by a man called Al Steiner to be the house band for the Blue Note club. The band was called The Regents. Drummer and founder Groschel developed health problems that lasted for six months. As a result he was replaced by drummer Bob Andrews.

Around 1963, The Regents broke up and a short time later was reformed as a recording band with a different line up. Kennedy hung around, and afterwards joined the replacement house band, The Silhouettes which was Doug Riley's band. Dianne Brooks came on board as well. The Silhouettes were playing there on a night in February 22, 1964. This is when William "Smitty" Smith first met Kennedy. They hit it off quite well and stayed in touch. They had discussed a plan to put together and band to play behind Dianne Brooks. This would later become a reality. The Silhouettes played at the Blue Note for three years.

=== The Soul Searchers ===
In 1966, the group The Soul Searchers was formed. Even though the group is referred to as the Soul Searchers, the name they performed as was Diane Brooks, Eric Mercury and the Soul Searchers. The instrumental part of the group consisted of Eric "Mouse" Johnson on drums and vocals, Kennedy on tenor, baritone sax and background vocals, Terry Logan on guitar and vocals, and William "Smitty" Smith on Hammond B3 organ and vocals. Their first gig was at the Memory Lane in Toronto. Kennedy eventually left the band and was replaced by saxophonist Glen McDonnell. Some time later, following the break up of the group, William Smith followed Kennedy direction and joined Grant Smith and The Power.

== Links ==
- Discogs
