= Dr. Music =

Canadian jazz band

- Origin: Toronto, Ontario, Canada
- Genre: Jazz
- Years active: 1969–1977; 1984
- Label: GRT of Canada

Dr. Music was a Toronto jazz group founded in 1969 by producer, arranger and performer Doug Riley. The band recorded three albums and toured across Canada. The personnel of the band changed throughout its history, with Riley remaining at the core of the group.

== Background ==
The group also inherited some members from the group Motherlode.

Along with the group Everyday People, Dr. Music were one of the key acts for the GRT label.

== History ==
In 1969, Doug Riley became the music director for The Ray Stevens Show. He was asked to put together a group of musicians to play for the 1969–1970 season of the show. Riley's 16-piece vocal and instrumental band became known as Dr. Music. When the show was cancelled in 1970, Dr. Music remained together to record and tour Western Canada. Riley became partners with producer Terry Brown to form the Toronto Sound Recording Studio where Dr. Music recorded from 1970 to 1971.

At this point, Dr. Music joined forces with the Canadian duo Terry Black and Laurel Ward, which led to a more vocal-driven sound for the band. In 1972, GRT Record Company released the group's first recording entitled Dr. Music, which included the hits "Sun Goes By", "One More Mountain to Climb", and "Try a Little Harder". This album was produced by Riley and co-arranged by Riley and Steve Kennedy. Because of the number of singers in the band, this album had a gospel-rock feel, although it still fit within the jazz rock genre.

Shortly after Dr. Music's album release, the group disbanded, despite the success of the single "Sun Goes By". This gave Riley an opportunity to concentrate on his studio position at Toronto Sound Recording. In 1973, Doug Riley assembled a second version of Dr. Music. This group, however, was only a seven-piece ensemble. This new version of Dr. Music toured Western and Eastern Canada and released a new album, Dr. Music II . The group split up in 1974.

Riley continued to produce and arrange for television shows. From 1973 to 1974, he worked as a music director on Keith Hampshire's television series Music Machine. In 1974, he formed the third version of Dr. Music which became the house band of the show. This group recorded the album Bedtime Story at Toronto Sound Studios during February and March 1974. Bedtime Story consisted of jazz compositions by Riley and his band members, Claude Ranger and Don Thompson, and belonged to the genre of progressive jazz rock.

Dr. Music continued to be a leading jazz band within Toronto throughout the 1970s but formally disbanded in 1977. In 1984, Riley resurrected the idea Dr. Music by creating a group composed of his musical friends. Together they recorded the album Dr. Music Circa 1984.

== Members of Dr. Music ==
=== 1972 Dr. Music ===
Doug Riley (keyboards), Laurel Ward (vocals), Rhonda Silver (vocals), Brenda Gordon (vocals), Terry Black (vocals, harmonica), Diane Brooks (vocals), Trudy Desmond (vocals), Michael Kennedy (congas), Steve Kennedy (vocals, tenor sax, flute), Brian Russell (vocals), Terry Clarke (drums), Kenny Marco (guitar), Doug Mallory (vocals, guitar), Don Thompson (bass, vibes, percussion), Bruce Cassidy (trumpet, flugelhorn), Gary Morgan (clarinet, baritone sax, alto flute), Keith Jollimore (vocals, baritone, alto & tenor sax, flute), and Barrie Tallman (trombone)

=== 1973 Dr. Music II ===
Doug Riley (keyboards), Doug Mallory (lead vocals, guitar), Wayne Stone (drums), Michael Kennedy (vocals, percussion), Steve Kennedy (vocals, tenor & alto sax, flute), Keith Jollimore (vocals; baritone, tenor sax; flute), Barrie Tallman (trombone)

=== 1974 Bedtime Story ===
Doug Riley (keyboards), Doug Mallory (lead vocals, guitar), Claude Ranger (drums), Bruce Cassidy (trumpet, fluegel horn), Don Thompson (electric & acoustic bass), Dave Brown (drums), Steve Kennedy (vocals, tenor sax, flute), Keith Jollimore (vocals, baritone, alto sax, flute), and Barrie Tallman (trombone)

=== 1977 Transcription ===
Doug Riley (keyboards), Keith Jollimore (saxophone), Steve Kennedy (saxophone), Barrie Tallman (trombone), Doug Mallory (guitar), Tom Szczesniak bass, and Bob McClaren (drums)

== Discography ==
=== Albums ===
- Dr. Music (GRT of Canada, Ltd. Record Company) (1972) #23 CAN
- Dr. Music II (GRT) (1973) #78 CAN
- Bedtime Story (GRT) (1974)
- Transcription (RCI) (1974)
- Dr. Music Circa 1984 (CTL, Canadian Talent Library Trust) (1985)

=== Compilations ===
- Retrospective (GRT) (1975)

=== Singles ===
- Try A Little Harder (GRT) 1971 #78 CAN
- One More Mountain To Climb (GRT) 1971 #14 CAN
- Gospel Rock (GRT) (1972) #65 CAN
- Sun Goes By (GRT) (1972) #23 CAN
- Long Time Comin' Home (GRT) (1972) #28 CAN

== Post Dr. Music ==
Many of the members of Dr. Music went on to pursue their own musical careers. Don Thompson continued as a jazz bassist and piano player, winning two Juno awards. Keith Jollimore and Bruce Cassidy became members of the Canadian rock band, Lighthouse. Doug Riley, who became known by the nickname Dr. Music, continued to perform, compose, and arrange.

He collaborated on more than 300 recordings with musicians such as Moe Koffman, Anne Murray, David Clayton-Thomas, Gordon Lightfoot, the Brecker Brothers, Bob Seger, Ray Charles, Molly Johnson, and Natalie MacMaster. He also recorded a number of solo albums including Dreams (1976), Freedom (1990), Con Alma (1994), and A Lazy Afternoon (1997).

Riley won Jazz Report's "Jazz Organist of the Year" from 1993 to 2000. In 2003, he became a member of the Order of Canada. Brenda Russell (née Gordon), a member of Dr. Music in 1972, recorded nine solo albums and wrote "Piano in the Dark," which received three Grammy Award nominations. The title track of Brenda's 4th album Get Here was covered by Oleta Adams and became a worldwide hit.

Together with lyricists-composers Allee Willis and Stephen Bray, she wrote the score for the 2005 Broadway musical version of Alice Walker's The Color Purple, produced by Oprah Winfrey. Russell and her co-writers were nominated for a Tony Award (for Best Score) and a Grammy Award (in the Best Musical Show Album category).
