= Compo Company =

Canadian independent record company

The Compo Company Ltd.
- Industry: Music
- Founder: Herbert Berliner
- Defunct: 1970
- Fate: Sold to MCA Inc. and became MCA Records Canada
- Successor: MCA Music Entertainment Canada; Universal Music Canada
- Headquarters: Lachine, Quebec
- Parent: Independent (1918-1951); Decca U.S. (1951–1970)

Compo Company Ltd. was Canada's first independent record company.

The Compo Company was founded in 1918 in Lachine, Quebec, by Herbert Berliner, an executive of Berliner Gramophone of Canada and the oldest son of disc record inventor Emile Berliner.

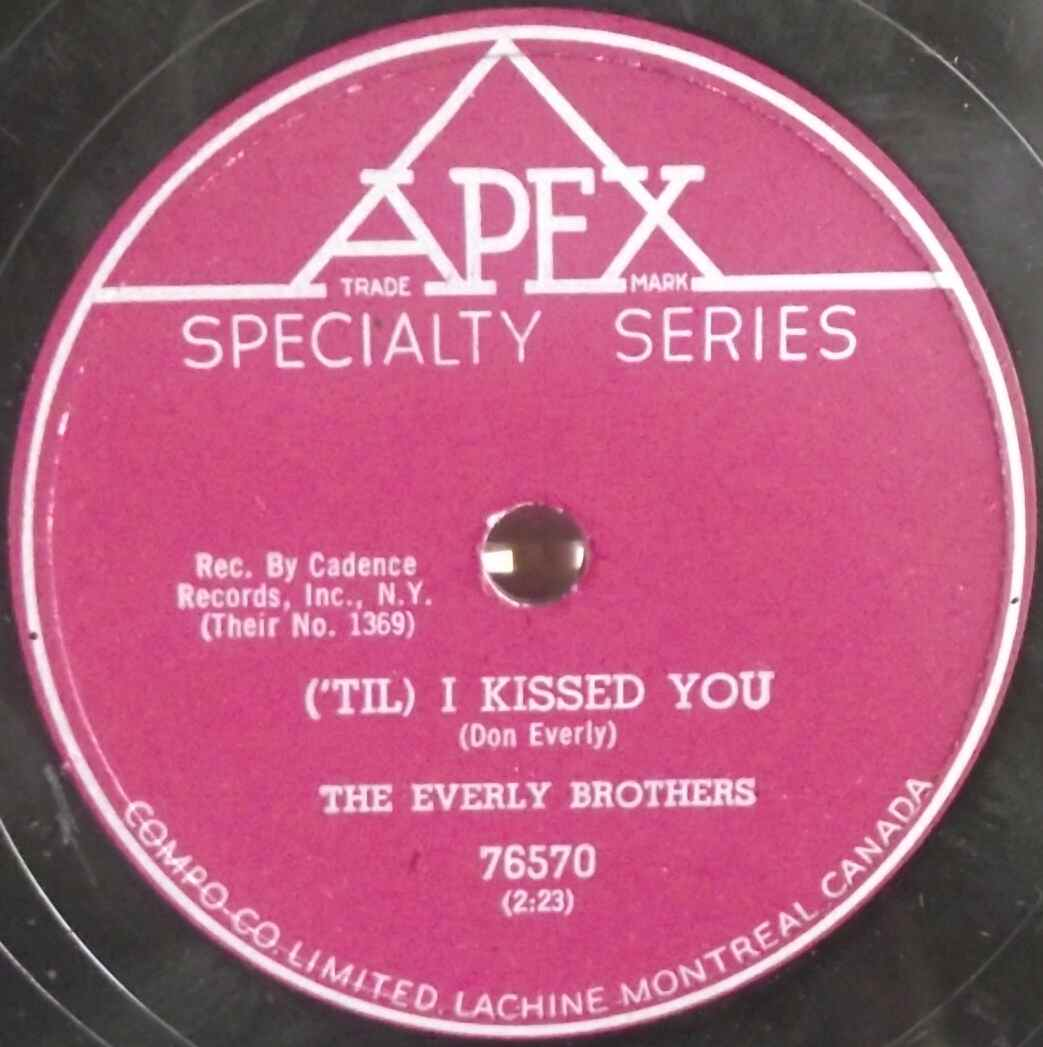
Everly Brothers "('Til) I Kissed You" issued on Compo's Apex label in 1959

Compo was created to serve the several American independent record companies which wanted to distribute records in Canada, such as Okeh Records. Its initial business was pressing records in Canada for these companies. Herbert Berliner broke with Berliner Gramophone in 1921, taking several senior Berliner Gramophone executives with him. This allowed Compo to immediately expand into a full-fledged record company by establishing the Sun and Apex record labels, among others. Apex was the longest lasting of the Compo labels, lasting into the 1970s.

Compo was one of only two Canadian record companies to survive the Great Depression. RCA Victor Records of Canada—formerly Berliner Gramophone—was the other (it is currently the oldest Canadian label that forms part of Sony Music Entertainment in Canada).

Warner Bros. Records used Compo as its Canadian distributor until it established its own Canadian branch in 1967. That branch later became Warner Music Canada.

In 1935, Compo became the Canadian licensee for the American Decca Records. American Decca bought Compo in 1951 with Berliner staying on as president until his death in 1966. MCA Inc. acquired Compo when it acquired American Decca. Compo was renamed MCA Records (Canada) in 1970. The company eventually evolved into Universal Music Canada.

== See also ==
- Music of Canada
- Apex Records (Canada)
