= Doug Riley =

Canadian musician (1945–2007)

Background information
- Born: Douglas Brian Riley; April 12, 1945; Toronto, Canada
- Died: August 27, 2007 (aged 62) Calgary, Canada
- Genre: Jazz
- Occupations: Musician, producer
- Instrument: Piano
- Formerly of: The Silhouettes, Dr. Music

Douglas Brian Riley, CM (April 12, 1945 – August 27, 2007) was a Canadian musician, also known as Dr. Music. He spent two decades with the Famous People Players as its musical director, besides his participation on over 300 album projects in various genres, which included the gold and multi-platinum records Night Moves, Against the Wind, and Endless Wire. Riley died of a heart attack on August 27, 2007.

== Biography ==
Riley was a graduate of the University of Toronto and studied at the Royal Conservatory of Music.

Doug Riley was born and raised in Toronto. At the age of two he was diagnosed with polio. When he was three, as a way to help cope with his physical disability and to provide him with a means of self-expression, he began to study piano. In his teens, he played with R&B band the Silhouettes. He attended the University of Toronto and, in 1965, graduated with a Bachelor of Music. He did his postgraduate work on the music of the Iroquois. In 1969, Riley was the arranger and keyboardist on Ray Charles' album Doing His Thing. In a 2006 interview with the Toronto Star, Doug Riley said, "Ray Charles was my first influence outside the boogie-woogie and stride pianists like Albert Ammons and Fats Waller". After the completion of the album, Ray Charles asked Doug Riley to join his band, but Riley turned down the offer and decided to stay in Toronto to continue his musical career.

== Career (groups) ==
=== The Silhouettes ===
Background

As a teenager, he was in the Silhouettes, playing R&B at the Blue Note, a night club in Toronto. Musicians also included Steve Kennedy and Dianne Brooks. They played at the Blue Note on February 22, 1964, where William "Smitty" Smith first met Steve Kennedy. The Silhouettes were the house band there, replacing the original house band, The Regents, and inheriting their saxophonist Kennedy in the process. They played at the Blue Note for three years. They recorded two singles with Jack Hardin, "I'm Not Running After You (Anymore)" b/w "I Will Never Turn My Back On You" (1966) and "She'll Be Back" b/w "Love Is Wonderful" (1967). They were also the backing band on Eric Mercury's 1966 single "I Wondered Why" / "Softly".

Career

In early 1965, the group was backing singers Jack Hardin and Dianne Brooks, appearing at The Hawk's Nest in Toronto as the opening attraction. An ad appeared in the May 30, 1966 edition of RPM Weekly predicting a guaranteed 100% Canadian and possible international smash hit for "I'm Not Running After You (Anymore)". Reviews in the June 20 edition of RPM Weekly were lukewarm. Barry Sarazin of CJET didn't believe the song had the spice to be an instant hit but had merit to deserve airplay. Dave Charles of CJBQ said that it would at least deserve a chart rating. He also complimented Hardin's voice, saying that the song was ideal for the singer's style. As Jack Hardin & The Silhouettes, they played at the Whitby Arena on May 13, 1967.

=== Dr. Music ===
Background

Riley formed the group Dr. Music in 1969. It began with Riley being asked to put together musicians for The Ray Stevens Show on CTV. This was for the 1969 to 1970 season. The core of the ensemble stayed together after the show's cancellation, and they recorded and toured together. The group had a run of Top 20 hits during the 1970s.

Career

Their single "One More Mountain to Climb" b/w "The Land" got a good review in the September 11, 1971 edition of Cash Box. Spending 7 weeks on Vancouver's CKVN chart, it peaked at #15 in October that year. Their debut album was released on the GRT label in 1972. Self-titled, the album featured the tracks "Sun Goes By", "One More Mountain to Climb", and "Try a Little Harder". Riley produced the album as well as co-arranging it with Steve Kennedy. "Sun Goes By", which Kennedy wrote, spent 9 weeks on Vancouver's CKVN chart, peaking at #12. Not long after the release of their album, the group broke up. He later formed another version of the group.

== Composer, producer ==
A prolific composer of jingles at the age of 20, he was working in collaboration with Mort Ross, Tommy Ambrose and Larry Trudel. Trudel had the company Trudel Productions.

He composed the song "Show Him (He's Not Alone)", which was Dianne Brooks' second single that was released on Revolver (REVS 003) in 1969. It was produced by Mort Ross. With Ross, he produced "When I Die", which was a hit for the group, getting to No. 1 in Canada and Top 20 on the U.S. charts.

Bruce Wheaton wrote the song "You Make Me Wonder", which was recorded as a demo with his band Everyday People. The demo was taken to Toronto Sound Studios owners Terry Brown and Doug Riley. They liked the song and signed the band up straight away. They produced the song plus "Nova Scotia Home Blues", which Wheaton had co-written with Pamela Marsh. The songs were released on single GRT 1233-01 in November 1970. "You Make Me Wonder" peaked at No. 60 for the week of 9 January 1971, and the B-side, "Nova Scotia Home Blues", peaked at No. 20 on the RPM MOR Playlist chart for the week of 19 December, holding its position until 9 January 1971.

== Discography ==
=== Dr. Music ===
- Dr. Music (1971)
- Dr. Music II (1973)
- Bedtime Story (1974)
- Doctor Music (1977)
- Circa '84 (1984)

=== Solo ===
- Dreams (1975)
- Freedom (1990)
- Con Alma (1994)
- A Lazy Afternoon (1997)
- Stride (2005)
- You Can't Make Peace (2007)

== Awards and recognition ==
- 1981: nominee, Juno Awards, Best Jazz Album: Tommy Ambrose at Last (Tommy Ambrose with the Doug Riley Band)
- 1993-2000: Jazz Organist of the Year, Jazz Report Awards
- 2003: member, Order of Canada
