= When I Die (Motherlode song) =

1969 single by Motherlode

Single by Motherlode

from the album When I Die
- B-side: "Hard Life"
- Released: April 1969
- Genre: Soul
- Length: 3:20
- Label: Buddah
- Songwriters: Steve Kennedy, William Smith
- Producers: Mort Ross, Doug Riley

Motherlode singles chronology
"When I Die" (1969)	"Memories of a Broken Promise" (1969)

"When I Die" is a 1969 hit single by Motherlode. It is the title track of their debut LP and was their first single.

== Background ==
A studio musician who worked with artists like Sam Cooke, Carol Kaye, played bass guitar on this recording.

== Charts ==
In the US, the song reached number 18 on the Billboard Hot 100 and number 12 on the Cash Box Top 100. "When I Die" was a major hit in Canada, reaching number 1 in August of the year.

== Charts ==
=== Weekly charts ===
Chart (1969)	Peak position
Canada RPM Top Singles	1
Canada CHUM Chart Top 30	5
US Billboard Hot 100	18
US Cash Box Top 100	12

=== Year-end charts ===
Chart (1969)	Rank
Canada	35
US Billboard Hot 100	71
US Cash Box	94
