= Jim Mancel =

Canadian musician

- Genres: Rock, pop, r&b
- Occupation: Musician
- Labels: Polydor, Celebration, Change, Apex, Quality, Cel Mar Inc., People City Music
- Formerly of: Chester

Jim Mancel was a Canadian singer, producer, composer and arranger who had several hits from the early 1970s and another in the early 1980s. He has recorded for the Polydor, Apex, and Quality labels, and Quality's subsidiary, Celebration. His hits include, "I Could Give You the World" which was a hit on the MAPL chart in 1970, and his 1975 single "Let the Phone Ring" which was also commercially successful in Canada. He hit the adult contemporary chart in 1977 with "Just Be Yourself". He was also a member of the Canadian band, Chester who had a hit in 1973 with "Make My Life a Little Bit Brighter".

Competing in overseas musical events, he has won awards in Greece and France.

== Background ==
In the late 1950s at the age of thirteen, Jim Mancel was singing a cappella in Toronto Hillcrest Park with two of his young friends. At 2am, a man in a long flannel coat appeared out of the darkness. After convincing them that he wasn't a deviant, they went the man to his house where they did an audition for him and his wife. The man then arranged a gig for them at a folk club in Toronto, the Purple Onion. After that the boys faded out of sight.

In 1971, Mancel won the Songwriters' award at the Cannes Festival in France.

Mancel was the lead singer of the Canadian group Chester, which was formed by Glen Morrow in late 1972. The group consisted of Mike Argue on lead guitar and vocals, Jim Mancel on lead vocals, and Glen “Wedge” Monroe on drums, piano, and guitar, and Glenn Morrow on keyboard, guitar and vocals. The group had a hit with "Make My Life a Little Bit Brighter" which spent 13 weeks on Vancouver’s CKLG chart, peaking at #3 in November 1973. After the group broke up, Mancel embarked on a solo career and recorded the single, "Let the Phone Ring".

Mancel was also mentored by Sam Sniderman at some stage in his career.

In 1976, Mancel entered into a partnership with John Marmora with the company, Celmar Productions which was at one time rated as one of Canada's top three jingle recording companies. For the next ten years the company won awards and produced over five hundred advertising jingles. Their client base reached from Canada to the United States.

Working with The Longo Brothers, Mancel recorded a composition of theirs.

== Career ==
=== 1970s ===
"I Could Give You the World"

In 1970, Mancel's single "I Could Give You the World" was released. It became an award winner in Greece at the 3rd Olympiad of Song. With "Aido" by Ljupka Dimitrovska from Yugoslavia in first place, Cash Box magazine wrote that his place was second, and in third place was Eva Correia José Maria from Brazil with "Teletema". In actual fact, Mancel who was representing the United States came third. He received a medal and $300 in prize money. He was also pictured on page 29 of the Photo Journal newspaper, and in another in Cash Box with the other two contestants.

It entered the Top 50 MAPL Canadian Chart at #49 on September 19. It would get to #26 on the Top 30 MAPL Canadian Chart on October 31. On that week, the chart had been changed from Top 50 MAPL to Top 30 MAPL. The following week (November 7) the chart had changed again and was now the Top 20 MAPL chart. The song was now in the "Recommended singles meeting CRTC requirements for AM radio" section. On the 14th of that month it was in the "Recommended selections that have met RPM's good music programming standards" section, just outside the Top 20 MAPL GMP Playlist chart.

It spent a total of seven weeks in the MAPL chart.

"Let the Phone Ring"

In 1975, the single, "Let the Phone Ring" would be a national hit. It entered the RPM 100 Top Singles chart at #97 on February 15. It peaked at #77 on March 15. With the single getting a heavy amount of air-attention in Toronto, it was making the right kind of noise over the border, reaching the ears of people in Buffalo. It got the interest of the WYSL program director Steve Mitchell. Several copies were also taken to various radio stations in the United States due to the growing interest in the record. Meanwhile in Canada, as recorded by the April 19 issue of RPM Weekly, the single was still charting regionally and getting spun on contemporary play lists such as Jim Duncan's show at CKBC in Bathurst (charted), CFOM-FM in Quebec, CKCK in Regina (charted), Billie Gorrie's show on CKRC in Winnipeg (charted). Billboard reported in the May 5 issue that the record was showing some surprising sales action in Canada with it being playlisted and charting across the country.

It spent a total of four weeks in the National chart.

Further activities

As reported by RPM weekly in the June 7, 1975 issue, Mancel was free from his contract with the Celebration label and looking around for a new record deal. He was also planning for a session at the 16-track facility at Master's Workshop studio in Toronto which was run by Doug MacKenzie. With a recent gig at Kingston behind him which resulted in "Let the Phone Ring" becoming one of local radio's top phone requests, Mancel and his five-piece band Reachout had a good run on the Ontario club circuit. They were to set to appear at the Shamrock club in Toronto on June 2.

"Just Be Yourself", Change Records period

Along with Myles Cohen, Jeanette Brantley, Aura, Mancel was part of Change's Canadian list of artists.

In 1977, the single "Just Be Yourself" bw "Dreams" was released on the Change Records label, Cat #CH 45003. It was produced by John James Stewart. Mancel co-wrote the A side with Glen Morrow. The B side was written by Bill Hughes.

In January 1978, the record had been getting some good attention. Being one of the records that was in the "Additions to playlists and charts that are not yet charted on the RPM charts" category, it was getting spun on Dave Watts' show at CFRA Ottawa, and Ray Edwardson's show at CFSL Weyburn, It was also charting there, entering the station's chart #39 for the week of January 21, 1978. A breakout market addition at CFRA Ottawa, it was also playlisted on Dave Watts' show. By the week of February 4, the record had been on the RPM Adult Oriented Play list chart for three weeks. It had moved up from #47 to #42. It peaked at #37 on February 25, spending a total of seven weeks in the chart.

By March 18, RPM had noted that the record had received solid airplay in the MOR and Top 40 markets across Canada. It did particularly well in the Maritimes. It peaked at #24 on CKTS in Sherbrooke. It was currently at #13 on CKBC Bathurst. It had also had a nine-week run at Ottawa's leading station, CFRA. Throughout the Maritimes there were fourteen stations spinning the disc. There were other stations that had picked up on it including some adult contemporary stations which were instrumental in getting the record to have its charting run on the RPM Adult Oriented playlist.

According to Mancel's label, his debut album was to be released in April. Artist Aura a.k.a. Aura Urziceanu recorded his composition "L.A. Sunshine" which was released on Change Records CHD 300 in 1978.

=== 1980s to 1990s ===
In 1980, Mancel released two singles. They were "Heart of a Lion (Terry's Theme)" bw "Heart of a Lion (Terry's Theme)" Instrumental on Quality Q 2382X and "We Had a Dream (The Dream Song)" bw "We Had a Dream (The Dream Song) Long version on Apex AP 95564. It was credited to The Northern Light Orchestra Featuring Jim Mancel.

In 1981, working with The Longo Brothers, Mancel sang lead on the song "Easy Life" which was written by Frank and Larry Longo. He co-produced and co-arranged the record with John Marmora. It was released on People City Music C-336. It was a hit on the CKLW chart that year.

In a joint-effort production with John Marmora and The Longo Brothers, the song "City Motions" (Featuring Moe Koffman) bw "If The Feeling’s Not Right" was released on People City Music PCM-823 in 1984. It got into the CanCon Top 10 Adult Contemporary chart that year. It was in the chart from October 6 to the 27th.

1984 was also the year that Mancel pulled out of his Celmar Productions partnership to re-pursue his solo career.

== List of hits and participation ==
List
Act	Title	Year	Chart	Peak	Wks	Role	Notes #
Jim Mancel	"I Could Give You the World"	1970	MAPL Top 50; MAPL Top 30	26	7	Artist	3rd place winner 3rd Olympiad of Song, Greece
Chester	"Make My Life a Little Bit Brighter"	1973	RPM 100; Cash Box 100; Cash Box Looking Ahead	10; 100; 101	21; 1; 6	Band member Vocals	
Jim Mancel	"Let the Phone Ring"	1975	RPM 100	77	4	Artist; Composer	
Jim Mancel	"Just Be Yourself" / "Dreams"	1977	RPM Adult Oriented Play list	37	7	Artist	
Jim Mancel	"Easy Life"	1981	CKLW	HB		Artist; Co-producer, co-arranger	
The Longo Brothers featuring Moe Koffman	"City Motions"	1984	CanCon Top 10; Adult Contemporary	10	4	Co-producer	

== Discography (selective) ==
Singles
Act	Title	Cat	Year	Notes #
Jim Mancel	"I Could Give You The World" / "Sidewalk Dreamer"	Polydor 2065 026	1970	
Jim Mancel	"Let The Phone Ring" / "Jenny"	Celebration CEL 2116X	1975	
Jim Mancel	"Just Be Yourself" / "Dreams"	Change CH 45003	1977	
The Northern Light Orchestra Featuring Jim Mancel	"We Had a Dream (The Dream Song)" Short Version / "We Had a Dream (The Dream Song)" Long Version with Dialogue	Apex AP 95564	1980	
Jim Mancel	"Heart of a Lion (Terry's Theme)" / "Heart of a Lion (Terry's Theme)" (Instrumental)	Quality Q 2382X	1980	
Jim Mancel	"Easy Life" / "Easy Life" (Instrumental)	People City Music C-336	1981	
Jim Mancel	"After All You Put Me Through" (Mono) / "After All You Put Me Through" (Stereo)	Cel Mar CM-001	1981	
