= I'm as Guilty as You =

Studio album by Brian Plummer
- Released: 1981
- Studio: Studio West
- Label: Sefel Records SEF-1002
- Producer: Stacy Heydon

Brian Plummer chronology
| No Questions (1980) | I'm as Guilty as You (1981) | No Questions Remixed version (1981) |

I'm as Guilty as You is a 1981 album by Brian Plummer. It contains the single "Lisa" and the controversial single "I'm as Guilty as You".

== Background ==
Along with Cravings by Daniel Lavoie, Needless Freaking by Dwayne Ford, and Lessons of Love by Guidonna Lee, I'm as Guilty as You represents Sefel Records' expansion into popular music.

The album eventually ended up in the bargain bins due to the stalling of Plummer's career.

== Reception ==
John Griffin wrote in the 3 October 1981 issue of the Montreal Gazette that Brian Plummer had delivered an ambitious second album on the audiophile Sefel label.

The album was reviewed by Bill Robertson in the 24 October 1981 issue of The Star-Phoenix. He noted Plummer's reliance on raw and choppy guitar chords for his sound and his pinning his word-wise lyrics to it which set him apart from the other "guts and guitars gang". He finished off with "Second time around, Plummer gets better".

As reported in the 5 December 1981 issue of The Star-Phoenix, Plummer's album I'm as Guilty as You was getting attention in Canada.

== Live performances ==
As reported in the 8 September 1982 issue of the Star-Phoenix, Brian Plummer and The Press Gang were appearing at Centennial Hall on 16 September to perform songs from his No Questions album and I'm as Guilty as You.

== Singles ==
The single from Plummer's album was "I'm As Guilty as You". The song was allegedly based on the kidnapping Toronto millionaire Fred Johnson. Backed with "Paper Star" the song was released on Sefel 45-009. According to an article in the 8 October issue of The Leader-Post, Plummer based it on the story of Lisa Johnson, wife of the Toronto car dealer Johnson. The article also said that this wasn't the first time that he had been inspired by the front pages of a daily newspaper.

== Track listing ==
=== A ===
- "The Fire-Eater" - 3:31
- "(At the End of) The Monkey Line" - 3:47
- "Paper Star - 3:43
- "Lisa" - 3:26
- "Caviar Or Ginseng" - 4:05

=== B ===
- "I'm As Guilty as You" - 3:30
- "Space Instead of Lines" - 4:01
- "The King of the Jungle" - 3:03
- "Such a Fuss" - 2:34
- "Steady Rain" - 4:04
