= Ridin' High (Van Dyke song) =

Song by Van Dyke

from the album Deal Me In
- A-side: "Ridin' High"
- B-side: "They Call Her Easy"
- Released: 1977
- Length: 2:20
- Label: Change CH 45004-AS
- Composer: Bob Van Dyke
- Producer: John James Stewart

Van Dyke singles chronology
"This Love Song" (1977)	"Ridin' High" (1977)	"'Till The Morning" (1978)

"Ridin' High" is a 1977 single by singer Van Dyke. It made the charts that year. The B side was also a hit.

== Background ==
"Ridin' High" was written by Change Records recording artist Van Dyke. He recorded the song with John James Stewart as the producer. It was the A side of the single that was released on Change 45004 in 1978. The B side was the Harry Chapin composition, "They Call Her Easy". It ended up being a two-sided charting record.

"Ridin' High" backed with " Bought and Sold" was released in Australia on 7 Records MS 293.

== Reception ==
Along with "Does the Rain Only Fall on My Mansion" by Jerry Palmer and "It's All Wrong, But It's All Right" by Dolly Parton, "Ridin' High" was one of the three RPM Country Action Singles for the week of 8 April 1978.

== Airplay ==
As reported in the 18 March issue of RPM Weekly, Van Dyke's album was gaining airplay in all formats. "Ridin' High" had been added to the playlist of AM and FM Country stations. It had been added to the lists of CHOO in Ajax, CFGM in Toronto, CKWX in Vancouver, CJCA-FM in Edmonton, CKLO-FM in Brandon, CKRM Regina, CFMK-FM in Kingston, CKBC in Bathurst, CJCJ in Woodstock, CHMM-FM in Winnipeg as well as CKLW-FM and CKBY-FM.

== Charts ==
Listed as "Riding High", the single debuted at No. 46 on the RPM Country Playlist chart for the week of 18 March. For the week of 13 May, it was in its ninth charting week. It peaked at No. 16. It held that position for an additional week. It was still charting at No. 26 for the week of 3 June.
