= Just Be Yourself =

"Just Be Your Self"

Single by Jim Mancel
- B-side: "Dreams"
- Released: 1977
- Length: 3:48
- Label: Change CH 45003
- Songwriter: Jim Mancel / Glen Morrow
- Producer: John James Stewart

Jim Mancel singles chronology
"Let the Phone Ring" (1975)	"Just Be Your Self" (1977)	"We Had a Dream" (1981)

"Just Be Yourself" was the third hit single for Jim Mancel. It made the RPM Weekly Adult Oriented Play list chart. It also received regular airplay at some major record stations.

== Background ==
By 1977, Mancel was signed to Change Records. In 1977, the single "Just Be Yourself" was released by Change Records backed with the B-side, "Dreams". It was produced by John James Stewart. Mancel co-wrote the A-side with former Chester bandmate Glen Morrow. The B side was written by Billie Hughes.

It is included on the 2008 Solid Soul Volume 4 compilation.

== Chart performance ==
=== Airplay ===
In January 1978, the record had been getting some good air-play. Being one of the records that was in the "Additions to playlists and charts that are not yet charted on the RPM charts" category, it was getting spins on Dave Watts' show at CFRA Ottawa, and Ray Edwardson's show at CFSL Weyburn. It became a song Mancel was known for.

=== Charts ===
It was also charting at CFS, entering the station's chart #39 for the week of January 21, 1978. A breakout market addition at CFRA Ottawa, it was also playlisted on Dave Watts' show.

By the week of February 4, the record had been RPM Adult Oriented Play list chart for three weeks and had moved up from #47 to #42. It peaked at #37 on February 25, spending a total of seven weeks in the chart.

By March 18, RPM had noted that the record had received solid airplay in the MOR and Top 40 markets across Canada. It did particularly well in the Maritimes. It peaked at #24 on CKTS in Sherbrooke. It was currently at #13 on CKBC Bathurst. It had also had a nine-week run at Ottawa's leading station, CFRA. Throughout the Maritimes there were fourteen stations spinning the disc. There were other stations that had picked up on it including some adult contemporary stations which were instrumental in getting the record to have a charting run on the RPM Adult Oriented playlist.

Chart performance for "Just Be Yourself"
Chart (1978)	Peak position
RPM Weekly RPM Adult Oriented Play list	37
CKTS chart	24
