= Patsy Gallant =

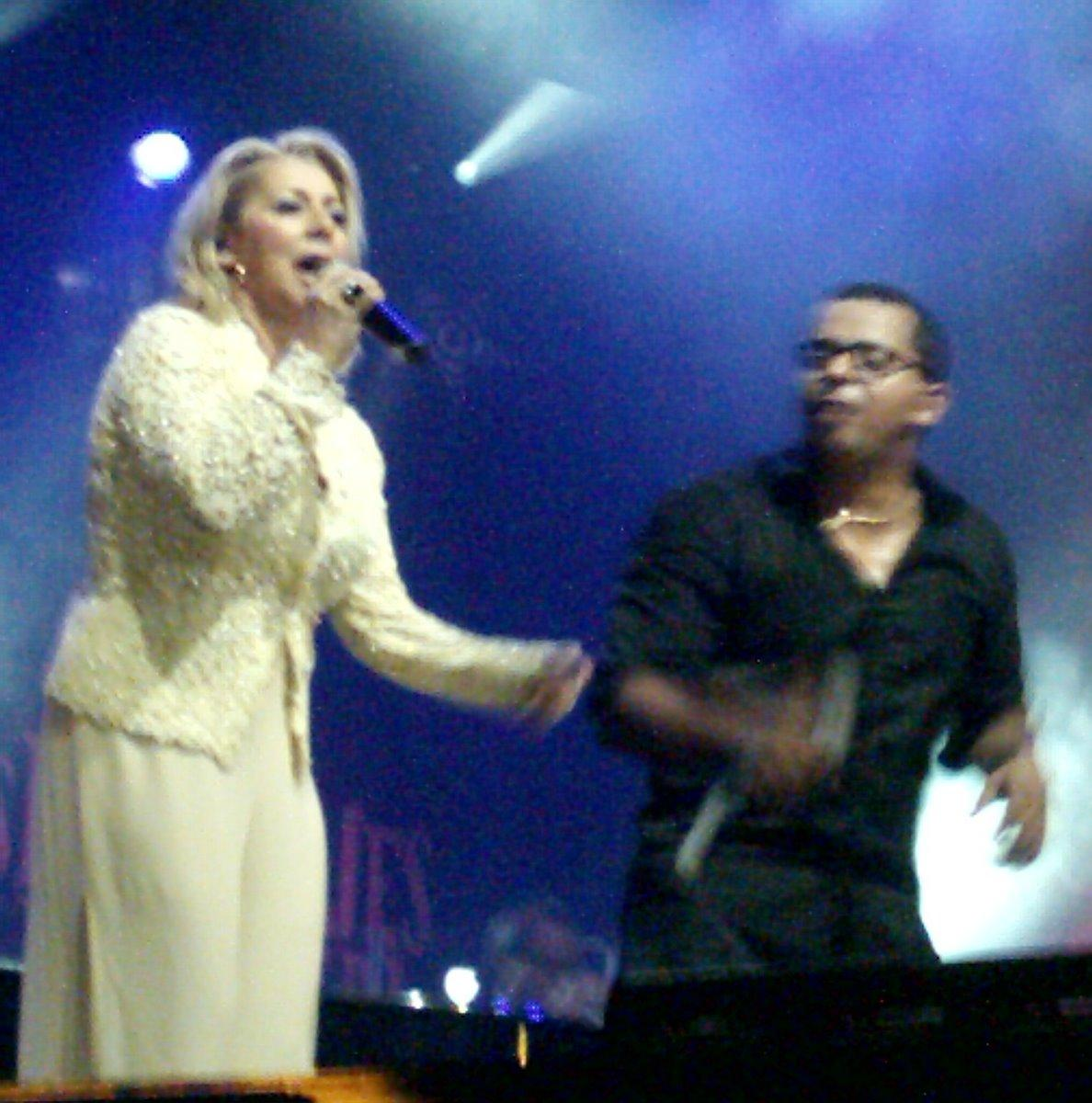
- Patsy Gallant (left) with Gregory Charles in concert in 2008

Background information
- Born: August 15, 1948 (age 78)
- Origin: Campbellton, New Brunswick
- Genres: Pop, Rock, Blues, Disco, Yacht Rock, Jazz
- Occupations: Singer/Songwriter, Actress
- Years active: 1953–present
- Labels: Columbia, Attic, Trilogie Musique, Pee Gee Records

Patricia Gallant CM (born August 15, 1948, in Campbellton, New Brunswick) is a Canadian pop singer and musical theatre actress. Of Acadian ancestry, she has recorded and performed in both English and French.

== Early life ==
Patsy Gallant was one of the 10 children of Béatrice Aubé Gallant and Arthur Gallant. At age five, she was part of The Gallant Sisters with older siblings Angeline, Florine, and Ghislaine. At eight Gallant gained television exposure after her parents moved to Moncton; two years later the group was playing nightclubs in Montreal. She left the group for a solo career in 1967, was featured in commercials, and was a regular on both the French-language TV variety program Discothèque and its English equivalent, Music Hop.

== Career ==
=== Successful beginnings in French ===
Gallant released her first single in 1967, which earned her appearances on a number of television variety shows. That same year she performed at Montreal's Place des Arts, opening for Charles Aznavour. Through the late 1960s and 1970s Gallant worked with a host of young and talented creators including Yves Lapierre, Judi Richards, Christine Charbonneau, and Denis Forcier. In 1971, Gallant co-starred on the weekly television variety show Smash presented by Télévision de Radio-Canada (the French arm of CBC Television). During the show, Gallant teamed up with singer-songwriter Christine Charbonneau who wrote most of the lyrics for her two major French albums that were released by Columbia Records. Gallant songs, written by Charbonneau included, "Tout va trop vite", "Thank you come again" (French version), "Le lit qui craque", "Un monde en voie de naître", and "Un jour comme les autres". The album Patsy Gallant (Tout va trop vite) from 1972 was followed by Toi l'enfant in 1974. Several of the songs including "Tout va trop vite", "Un jour comme les autres", "Le lit qui craque", and "Thank You Come Again (French version)" climbed the Quebec charts. Also found on the latter album is the original song "Les femmes", a hit song which was covered in 1976 by Sheila in France.

Patsy Gallant, as a bilingual artist, used to release English and French versions of her albums simultaneously. She aimed for the Francophone market of Quebec and Europe as well as English Canada and the United States. In September 1972 she released Upon My Own, her first English album. Although her two French albums were hits in French Canada, the only song from this album to score a minor hit was "Get That Ball", a funky song written by Yves Lapierre and Ken Owen. Other notable songs from this album are "This Old Lady", "Saturday Weather", "People Going Down the Avenue" and "I've Gotta Make It" (Upon My Own).

Intensifying her efforts in the American market, Gallant recorded her 1974 album Power in Nashville, Tennessee, United States. Although the album spawned four moderately popular singles with "Save the Last Dance For Me", "Make My Living", "Doctor's Orders" and the title song "Power", they were not a commercial breakthrough.

=== Disco Diva ===
Gallant's biggest pop success came when she teamed up with producer and manager Ian Robertson for her 1976 album, Are You Ready for Love. Together, Gallant and Robertson would produce five albums for Attic Records. They were nominated for the Juno Award on the Producer of the Year category in 1977 and 1978. Although they did not win, the nominations made Gallant the first woman ever to be nominated for a major record production award.

Having always been involved with jazz, soul music and funk, she started recording disco music in 1973 (initially in French). "Daya Dou Doum", from her album Toi, l'enfant, can be considered her first incursion. In 1975, she released "Makin' Love In My Mind" (in French, "J'ai le droit"). After leaving CBS, Gallant released a 7-inch single with a reworking of Gilles Vigneault's 1964 Québécois song "Mon Pays". Then, the following year, she released the English language version for this song: "From New York to L.A.". It was her only recording to attract considerable notice outside Canada, becoming a hit in many other countries such as the UK (#6 in the UK Singles Chart) in August 1977, Ireland (#5), Australia (#10), the Netherlands (#15), Norway (#7), South Africa (#5) and Sweden (#17). "Sugar Daddy" and the album's title song, "Are You Ready for Love", were also Top 20 Canadian hits that helped Gallant to win Juno Awards for Best Female Vocalist in 1976 and 1977. Although overlooked by radio in the U.S., "From New York to L.A." and "Sugar Daddy" were played in American discos. Gallant followed up in 1977 with her French album Besoin d'amour, which includes a French rendition of "Sugar Daddy". That year she won a Juno Award as best female vocalist.

Gallant released the English album Will You Give Me Your Love in 1977, which featured songs like "Every Step of the Way" and "Back to the City". One year later, she recorded the French album Patsy Gallant et Star, both in 1978 on Attic Records, and had a hit with "Stay a While With Me" ("Aime-moi" in French); she also released the English album Patsy! which contains the disco hit "O Michel". Gallant then released a bilingual greatest hits package in early 1979, which included a rendition of the original "Mon Pays".

Although named "the Canadian disco queen", Patsy Gallant never dedicated herself exclusively to the genre. All her albums from the late seventies feature obscure songs that range from Steely Dan-like West Coast music and blue-eyed soul ("Back to the City" and "It'll All Come Around") to Latin-Brazilian jazz ("Te Caliente") and Motown-inspired ballads ("Together Again" and "World of Fantasy").

=== Personal life ===
In the early seventies, Patsy Gallant was dating Ian Robertson, a photographer who became her manager and co-produced her recordings from 1975 to 1980. The couple split in 1977 and Gallant started dating Dwayne Ford, a Canadian musician who emerged as a member of Bearfoot and was playing keyboards in her accompanying band Star, as well as collaborating on her recordings. They married in 1980.

In 1985, Gallant and Ford had a son named Jason Remington Ford (who is also a singer and songwriter). The couple divorced in 1987.

=== Achievement through musicals ===
With the decline of disco, Gallant focused on adult contemporary music. After her 1984 album Take Another Look, she took a break from the music business. She returned in the late 1980s, performing gigs and taking roles in musical theatre. She has appeared in productions of Cats, Nunsense, a stage biography of Édith Piaf, and played the role of Stella Spotlight in the French hit musical Starmania, in Paris, France, which ran for eight years in the 1990s. Luc Plamondon, the creator of Starmania, wanted Gallant to play Stella in the original stage production in the 1970s; but owing to Gallant's busy schedule at the time, her managers did not even tell her about Starmania, and the role of Stella Spotlight in the original production went to Diane Dufresne. She also had a brief stint as Palma the stepmother in Cindy, a musical based on Cinderella, also written by Plamondon.

After living in Paris for eleven years, Gallant returned to Canada in 2005 and released the compilation album Tout va trop vite. The album contained a number of her biggest French hits, early recordings from the 1960s, lost disco-era songs such as "It's Got to Be You", and a re-recording of "Sugar Daddy". Gallant has more recently recorded a duet with the French rap group, Treizième Étage, called "Faut pas lâcher". The song appeared on the group's album L'Asphalte dans mon district (2006). Her most recent single "Coeur de velours" written by Mario Leonard was released in July 2010.

In 2015, she released the album Patsy Gallant chante Piaf.

In 2022, 38 years after releasing her previous album with original material, Patsy released the album "To Exist and Be Heard", with songs that she had been writing and developing for more than 10 years. The album, preceded by a few singles released on streaming platforms ('Mon bel indifférent / Around the World', 'Overdose de solitude', and 'J'ai besoin d'air / I Don't Care'), was described by her as "the album of my life" and brings a mix of rock, R&B, pop, jazz, blues and dance music.

=== Film and television ===
In 1973, Gallant had a minor role in the Denis Héroux film Enuff Is Enuff (J'ai mon voyage!) as an anglophone Canadian girl who tried to seduce Jean Lefebvre's character in a campsite.

On the strength of her disco success, Gallant hosted her own variety show, The Patsy Gallant Show, which was produced and broadcast on CTV in 1978 and 1979.

In 2002, Gallant had a supporting role in the feature film Yellowknife, in which she played a nightclub singer. Gallant performed four songs for the film soundtrack, including "Sugar Daddy" and three compositions penned by her, "Ain't No Way to Treat a Woman," "Dancing in the Wind," and "Save My Soul". For this role, Gallant was nominated for a 2003 Jutra Award for Best Supporting Actress (Meilleure Actrice de Soutien).

== Discography ==
=== Albums ===
- Patsy Gallant (Tout va trop vite) (1972)
- Upon My Own (1972)
- Power (1973)
- Toi l'enfant (1974)
- Are You Ready For Love (1976)
- Besoin D'Amour (1977)
- Will You Give Me Your Love? (1977)
- Patsy! (1978)
- Patsy Gallant Et Star (1978)
- Greatest Hits / Ses Plus Grands Succès (1979)
- Stranger in the Mirror (1980)
- Amoureuse (1981)
- Take Another Look (1984)
- Tout va trop vite ("best of" compilation including new version of "Sugar Daddy") (2005)
- Patsy Gallant chante Piaf (2015)
- To Exist And Be Heard (2022)

=== Singles ===
Year	Song	CAN	CAN AC	AUS	UK
1972	"Get That Ball"	32	27	-	-
1973	"I Don't Know Why"	-	47	-	-
1974	"Save the Last Dance for Me"	-	97	-	-
1974	"Raconte"	-	42	-	-
1975	"Doctor's Orders"	83	-	-	-
1975	"Makin' Love in My Mind"	66	-	-	-
1976	"From New York to L.A."	6	1	10	6
1977	"Are You Ready for Love?"	16	4	-	-
1977	"Sugar Daddy"	9	6	-	-
1978	"Back to the City"	69	-	-	-
1978	"Stay Awhile with Me"	77	28	-	-
1978	"Best of The Woman In Me"	77	28	-	-
1978	"Every Step of the Way"	-	26	-	-
1979	"O Michel"	-	22	-	-
1979	"We'll Find a Way" <w/ Dwayne Ford>	94	-	-	-
1979	"It's Got To Be You"	-	-	-	-
1980	"How Many Lonely Nights"	-	27	-	-
1980	"Ce matin-la"	-	-	-	-
1981	"Don't Forget About Me"	-	24	-	-
1986	"Hit The Streets Tonight"	-	-	-	-

|}

== JUNO Awards ==
- 1975 Female Vocalist of the Year (Nomination)
- 1977 Best Selling Single: "From New York to LA" (Nomination)
- 1977 Female Vocalist of the Year (Win)
- 1977 Producer of the Year: "From New York to LA" (Nomination; with Ian Robertson)
- 1978 Best Selling Single: "Sugar Daddy" (Win)
- 1978 Female Vocalist of the Year (Win)
- 1978 Producer of the Year: "Sugar Daddy" (Nomination; with Ian Robertson)
- 1979 Female Vocalist of the Year (Nomination)
- Carlisle Miller nominated for Composer of the Year (1978) for "Sugar Daddy"
- Gilles Vigneault nominated for Composer of the Year and Gene Williams for lyrics (1977) for "From New York to L.A.
