= Craig Ruhnke =

- Born: 17 December 1949; Scarborough, Ontario, Canada
- Died: 14 April 2015 (aged 65)
- Occupation: Musician
- Labels: Reprise Records, United Artists, Polydor, Sefel Records, Avalon, Pinnacle
- Formerly of: The Groovin' Company, Craig Ruhnke his Piano & Orchestra

Craig Ruhnke (December 17, 1949 – April 14, 2015) was a Canadian singer who had success in Canada with several singles in the 1970s. His biggest hit was in 1980 with "You're a Heartbreaker".

== Background ==
Craig Ruhnke was born in Scarborough, Ontario and grew up there. As a child he took piano and he also taught himself to play guitar. Having left high school, he joined the group, the Groovin’ Company which broke up due to a lack of success. From the early 1970s, he tried his hand as a songwriter and teaching guitar. It was 1974 that he recorded his first single.

Ruhnke wrote "I'll Always Love You". It was later recorded by Pinky Dauvin who worked with producer Andrew A. Melzer at Toronto Sound. Backed with "Long Gone", it was credited to The Pinky Dauvin Group and released on United Artists UAXW-235-W around April 1973. By early June it was on the playlist of CFRN in Edmonton. The single debuted at No. 97 in the RPM Weekly Adult Contemporary Playlist chart for the week of 23 June.

== Career ==
=== 1970s ===
It was reported in the 23 February 1974 issue of RPM Weekly that Ruhnke who had been signed to Reprise Records for over eleven months had released his first single, "My World", a tune he wrote himself.

In May 1974, he wrote "Summer Girl" and handled all of the vocals, arrangements and played all the instruments on the recording. The song charted nationally making No. 33 and boosted his profile as a musical force. It was also released in six countries.

=== 1980s ===
In 1980, he released "You're a Heartbreaker" bw "You and I" on A&M AM-498. It spent a month on the Canadian Top 40. It also made the charts in Japan and England.

It was reported in the 27 March 1982 issue of RPM Weekly that a deal had been struck between the Avenue Road Music Group and Linda Dawe Associates for the latter to represent and promote to radio songs that were controlled and administered by the Avenue Road Group. The first recordings in the deal were recordings by Mary-Lu Zahalan, Ron Mahonin, Jimi B. and Ruhnke's forthcoming Sefel Records single, "Baby Blue". The single which was written and arranged by Ruhnke was backed with "My Heart Belongs To You" and released on Sefel 45-010.

Cathy Kinsman and Ruhnke recorded the song "In the Movies" which was composed by her. He produced the recording as well as the B side which was credited to her. "In the Movies" was credited to Cathy Kinsman / Craig Ruhnke and released on Songmaster SM-4 in 1982. It debuted at No. 29 on the RPM Contemporary Adult for the week of 17 April 1982. At week nine, for the week of 12 June, it reached No. 9. It held that position for another week. It made No. 9 again for the week of 10 July.
