= The Longo Brothers =

- Origin: Canada
- Genres: Pop music, rock music, r&b, disco
- Years active: 1970s - ?
- Labels: Blue Chip; People City Music; Active Force Records
- Past members: Frank Longo; Larry Longo; Dino Longo

The Longo Brothers were a Canadian act who had some national hits during the 1970s. Other artists have also recorded their compositions. They have collaborated with Moe Koffman, Paul Zaza and Yvonne Murray.

== Background ==
The group was made up of Canadian brothers, Frank, Larry and Dino Longo.

They have had hits on the Canadian charts, which include an RPM Contemporary Adult chart hit in '83 with "Manhattan", and the following year, a CanCon hit with "City Motions". Their songs have been used in films and television shows including, Breaking Bad, All Hail King Julien, Freaks of Nature, The Wedding Ringer, "Cyrus" and Crazy Stupid Love.

Artists who have recorded their material include Yvonne Murray, Jim Mancel, and Patti Janetta.

Frank Longo who was born on November 22, 1953, in Toronto, Ontario is also an actor.

== Career ==
=== 1970s ===
They released the single "Free Feeling" in 1977 on Blue Chip 11. It was a pick for the Adult Oriented chart on July 16. In October 1978, the Longo Brothers released their single "Sun Side Up" bw "Looking For Love" on People City Music PCM-123. The single was produced by Paul Zaza and recorded at Zaza Sound Studio in Toronto. In 1979, their album Imitation Life was released on People City Music PCM 323LB. A disco / pop album, it contained the disco track, "Movin' On".

Also in 1979, a collaboration with Yvonne Murray, "Easy Life" was released.

=== 1980s ===
Frank, Larry and Dino worked on Patti Jannetta's self-titled album which was released in 1981. Also in 1981, the song they composed, and recorded by Jim Mancel, "Easy Life" was released. It was released on People City Music C-336. It was a hit on the CKLW chart that year.

By May 1982 their single "Coast to Coast" bw "Takin' Off" was out. Composed by Frank and Larry, the single was to appear on a proposed album. The were also producing their own recordings and active in composing songs for artists such as Jim Mancel, Patti Jannetta, and Yvonne Murray.

In 1983, the single, "Manhattan" / "Nightwalk" was released on People City Music PCM-523. The single debuted at #30 on the RPM Contemporary Adult chart for the week ending July 23, 1983. At its fifth week on August 20 it peaked at #27. Also in 1983, a single they recorded with Jill Vogel, "In the Middle of the Night" bw "In the Middle of the Night" (instrumental) was released on People City Music PCM 623. Written by Frank, Larry and Dino Longo, it was in the Recommended section of the Billboard Top Single Picks for August 13, 1983.

In March, 1984, the single "The Nightlife" bw "Coast to Coast" was released on People City Music PCM-723. It was credited to The Longo Brothers featuring Wayne St. John.

"City Motions" (Featuring Moe Koffman) bw "If The Feeling’s Not Right" was released on People City Music PCM-823 in 1984. The A side was jointly written by Frank and Larry. The production was a joint effort between the Longo Brothers, Jim Mancel and John Marmora. It got into the CanCon Top 10 Adult Contemporary chart that year. It charted from October 6 to the 27th.

== Discography (selective) ==
Singles
Act	Title	Cat	Year	Notes #
The Longo Brothers	"Sun Side Up" / "Looking for Love"	People City Music PCM 123	1978	
The Longo Brothers	"Coast to Coast" / "Takin Off"	People City Music C-382	1982	
The Longo Brothers	"Manhattan" / "Nightwalk"	People City Music PCM 523	1983	
The Longo Brothers Featuring Jill Vogel	"In the Middle of the Night" / "In the Middle of the Night" (Instrumental)	People City Music PCM 623	1983	
