= They Call Her Easy =

1970 song by Harry Chapin

"They Call Her Easy" is a song by Harry Chapin which he recorded in the 1970s. It was recorded later by Canadian singer Van Dyke who had a hit with it in Canada.

== Harry Chapin version ==
"They Call Her Easy"

Song by Harry Chapin

from the album Short Stories
- Composer: Harry Chapin
- Producer: Paul Leka

=== Background ===
The first time Harry Chapin and his band played "They Call Her Easy" was when they were in Champaign–Urbana in the early 1970s.

=== Airplay ===
As shown in the 25 January 1974 issue of Radio & Records, "Wold" and "They Call Her Easy" were the cuts being played from Harry Chapin's Short Stories album. They were still being played for the week of 1 March.

=== Performances ===
Along with songs; "Wold", "30,000 Lbs. of Bananas", "Mail Order Annie", and "Greyhound", "They Call Her Easy" was performed by Chapin at New York's Philharmonic Hall in March 1974.

== Van Dyke version ==
"They Call Her Easy"

Song by Van Dyke

from the album Deal Me In
- A-side: "Ridin' High"
- B-side: "They Call Her Easy"
- Released: 1978
- Length: 4:25
- Label: Change Records
- Composer: Harry Chapin
- Producer: John James Stewart

"They Call Her Easy" is a 1978 single by singer Van Dyke. It was chart hit in Canada where it registered on the RPM Adult Oriented Playlist and the RPM 100 Top Singles charts.

=== Background ===
Van Dyke recorded the song with John James Stewart as the producer. It was the B side to "Ridin' High" which was released on Change Records in 1978.

According to the 25 February 1978 issue of RPM Weekly, it was a credit to Van Dyke in his recording of the song as he didn't stick strictly to his own compositions.

"They Call Her Easy" was backed with "Deal Me In" and released in Australia on 7 Records.

=== Reception ===
As reported in the 25 February 1978 issue of RPM Weekly, "They Call Her Easy" was expected to get airplay at the top 40 and AOR levels.

Along with "Daylight Katy by Gordon Lightfoot and "Survival" by Marc Jordan, it was one of the three RPM Weekly Rock-Oriented Action Singles for the week of 29 April.

=== Airplay ===
The song had been added to the playlist of CFCN in Calgary for the week of 25 February. It was also an Action Single at CKY-FM in Winnipeg. By 18 March it had gained major market airplay at a range of stations. And "Ridin' High" had been added to the playlists of various AM and FM country stations.

=== Charts ===
"They Call Her Easy" debuted at No. 49 on the RPM Adult Oriented Playlist for the week of 18 March. It also debuted at No. 100 on the RPM 100 Top Singles chart that week. For the week of 20 May (week ten) it peaked at No. 26 then dropped down to No. 27 the following week. It had also peaked at No. 89 at week four on the RPM 100 Singles chart for the week of 20 May.
