= Let the Phone Ring =

Song by Jim Mancel
- A-side: "Let the Phone Ring"
- B-side: "Jenny"
- Released: 1975
- Label: Celebration CEL 2116X
- Composer: Jim Mancel
- Producer: R. A. (Bob) Morten

Jim Mancel singles chronology
"I Could Give You the World" (1970)	"Let the Phone Ring" (1975)	"Just Be Yourself" (1977)

"Let the Phone Ring" was the second hit single for singer-songwriter Jim Mancel. It charted in 1975 on the RPM 100 chart in Canada.

== Background ==
This was the second single for Jim Mancel who recorded the single, "I Could Give You the World "that was released in 1970. He also was a member of the group Chester who had a hit with "Make My Life a Little Bit Brighter" in 1973. In 1975, the single, "Let the Phone Ring" would be a national hit for Jim Mancel. Composed by Mancel, the single backed with "Jenny" was released on Celebration CEL 2116X. With the release of the record, the reaction to it in the first week was exceptionally good.

The single was getting a heavy amount of air-attention in Toronto, it eventually reached the ears of people in Buffalo. It got the attention and interest of Steve Mitchell who was the WYSL program director. Several copies of the record were also taken to various radio stations in the United States due to the growing interest there.

RPM Weekly reported in the June 7 issue that the song became one of the top phone requests on local radio.

== Chart performance ==
It entered the RPM 100 Top Singles chart at #97 on February 15. It peaked at #77 on March 15.

In Canada, as recorded by the April 19 issue of RPM Weekly, the single was still charting regionally and getting spun on contemporary play lists such as Jim Duncan's show at CKBC in Bathurst (charted), CFOM-FM in Quebec, CKCK in Regina (charted), Billie Gorrie's show on CKRC in Winnipeg (charted).

It entered the CKLG 30 chart at #25 on March 28. On April 25, it was at its second week at #19 on the CKLG 30 chart.

Billboard magazine reported in the May 5 issue that the record was showing some surprising sales action in Canada with it being playlisted and charting across the country.
