= No Questions =

1980 album by Brian Plummer

Studio album by Brian Plummer
- Released: 1980
- Studio: Studio West
- Label: Change Records CLP-8010
- Producer: J. J. Stewart

Brian Plummer chronology
No Questions (1980)	I'm as Guilty as You (1981)

No Questions is a 1980 album by Canadian rock musician, Brian Plummer. It was released on the Change Records label and contains the single "Money Talks"

== Background ==
The album was released through Change Records as a result of Brian Plummer wanting to sign with a label that would allow for more than one album in a contract. Plummer found Change Records to be the most accommodating.

Working with producer John Stewart, Plummer recorded the album with guitarist Stacey Heydon, drummer Glenn Ens and some studio musicians at Studio West in Saskatoon. It was released on Change Records CLP-8010 in 1980.

The two singles from the album are "Money Talks", followed by "Wizards Have Come".

The album was also issued in Germany on Jupiter Records 202 591–320 in 1980.

While Plummer was on tour to promote the album and single, Change Records went bankrupt.

It was reported in the 29 August 1981 issue of Billboard that Sefel Records were reissuing an album that Brian Plummer had recorded for a defunct record label. Set for release in the fall, the album was to appear with new mixes, vocals and packaging. According to Ned Powers in the 25 March issue of the The Star-Phoenix, Plummer had been working with engineer Stacy Heydon, and had created a more attractive package with the No Questions album with the vocals re-worked and album remixed. It was released on Sefel SEF-1005 that year.

== Reception ==
The album was reviewed in the 29 March 1980 issue of RPM Weekly. The review was positive with the reviewer writing that it was "a hard driving rock album with a live band sound". The strong lyrics and the unusual, city-conscious themes were also noted.

In his review that was published in The Star-Phoenix on 26 April 1980, Rod Salloum wrote that the album was a deliberate attempt to cash in on the latest rock trend by an artist who vastly underestimated his own potential. He did write that one or two of the album's tracks could make it to an AM playlist and gain good sales.

The album was also reviewed in the 4 July issue of the French language newspaper L'Évangéline.

According to Isaac Williams in the 16 August 1980 issue of the Victoria Daily Times, the album convinced him that something was about to happen. He wrote that the songs on the album were some of the best that he had heard. However, he also wrote that when an artist was that close to being great, was walking on dangerous ground. And a wrong step could bring it all tumbling down.

In the 6 December 1980 issue of New Musical Express Fred Dellar wrote that it was a personable album from the rugged-sounding Canuck singer-songwriter. He also wrote that it was a sad mistake to include "Jacky Boy" which utilized the Yorkshire Ripper. The song was banned from airplay in Britain.

== Airplay ==
The album was on the CanCon Albums Medium Rotation list at Q107 in Toronto for the week of 29 March and the following week. For the week of 3 May, it was still on medium rotation at Q107 and a Cancon Add at Chez 106 in Ottawa.

The album was still on the CanCon Medium rotation list, and for the week of 29 June at Q107 in Toronto.

== Single ==
The single "Money Talks" was on the CanCon Singles Playlisted list at CJBK-129 Radio London for the week of 10 May. It was on the list at CJME Music Radio for the week of 14 June and again on the list at CJME Music Radio for the week of 12 July.

== Track listing ==
=== A ===
1. "Money Talks" - 2:36
2. "No Questions" - 3:28
3. "Jacky Boy" - 3:12
4. "The Wizards Have Come" - 4:09
5. "Roll Away the Stone" - 4:44

=== B ===
1. "Full Moon on the Midway" - 3:00
2. "Killing Time" - 3:19
3. "Change the World (If You Want)" - 3:44
4. "Hole in the Wall" Saxophone – 3:09
5. "Losing Touch" - 4:40
