= Just Be Yourself (disambiguation) =

"Just Be Yourself" is a song by Jim Mancel.

Just Be Yourself may also refer to:

- "Just Be Yourself", single by American R&B/funk band Cameo, 1982
- Just Be Yourself, album by Curtis Lundy, 1987
- Just Be Yoursel, album by Jeff James (musician), 2013
- "Just Be Yourself", single and anime theme by Japanese group The World Standard, 2017
- "Just Be Yourself", song by South Korean group Twice from the album Celebrate, 2022
- Just Be Yourself, see List of 2001 This American Life episodes
- Just Be Yourself, independent short film with Kandyse McClure
