= Chester (band) =

Canadian bubblegum pop band

- Origin: Toronto, Ontario, Canada
- Genres: pop rock bubblegum pop
- Years active: 1972–1975, 1977
- Label: Celebration
- Past members: Jim Mancel; Mel O'Brien; Mike Argue; Wedge Monroe; Glen Morrow; Fran Cheslo

Chester was a Canadian bubblegum pop band, active primarily from 1972 to 1975. Although they released only two singles in their original form before breaking up, the single "Make My Life a Little Bit Brighter" was a Top 10 hit on the Canadian pop charts in 1973 and the band garnered a Juno Award nomination for Most Promising Group at the Juno Awards of 1974.

== Background ==
The band was formed by keyboardist Glen Morrow in 1972, and included vocalist Jim Mancel, guitarist and backing vocalist Mike Argue, bassist Mel O'Brien and drummer and pianist Wedge Monroe.

Mancel had some success with his 1970 single, "I Could Give You the World" which won him an award at the 3rd Olympiad of Song in Greece. It was also a hit on the Top 30 MAPL Canadian Chart.

== Career ==
In summer 1973, their single "Make My Life a Little Bit Brighter" premiered on RPM magazine's RPM100 and Adult Contemporary charts, eventually peaking at #10 in the RPM100 the week of September 22, 1973, and at #8 in the AC chart the week of October 27, 1973.

The record managed to chart in the United States. Entering the Cash Box Looking Ahead chart on October 6, 1973, it had seven weeks run with one of those weeks (September 1) just making it into the Cash Box Top 100 Singles chart. The last position was at #114. It also entered the Record World 100 - 150 singles chart at #114 on September 8, 1973. It peaked at #101 on October 6.

The follow-up single "Start a Dream", released in 1974, did not chart.

== Post Chester ==
Argue left the band in 1974 to pursue a solo career. Although the remaining band members initially continued as Chester, they released no further recordings before breaking up in 1975. Mancel recorded a solo single under his own name; in 1977, Mancel and Morrow each separately revived the band name Chester for two singles. New vocalist Fran Cheslo performed with Morrow's version of the band.

Argue recorded the single, "Dancing With Your Lady" bw "Oh Yeah" that was released on Celebration CEL 2101X in 1975. The song also got onto the K-tel compilation, Sounds Spectacular that was released that year. He became involved with Scientology but left after twelve years.

Jim Mancel went on to have a hit in 1975 with "Let the Phone Ring".

== Later years ==
In 1996 the band received a Classics Award from SOCAN, to mark "Make My Life a Little Bit Brighter" having been played 100,000 times on Canadian radio.

A compilation album, containing the singles released by Chester and those released by Argue and Mancel as solo artists, was released in 2006 on Unidisc Music.
