= Aura Urziceanu =

Romanian pop singer

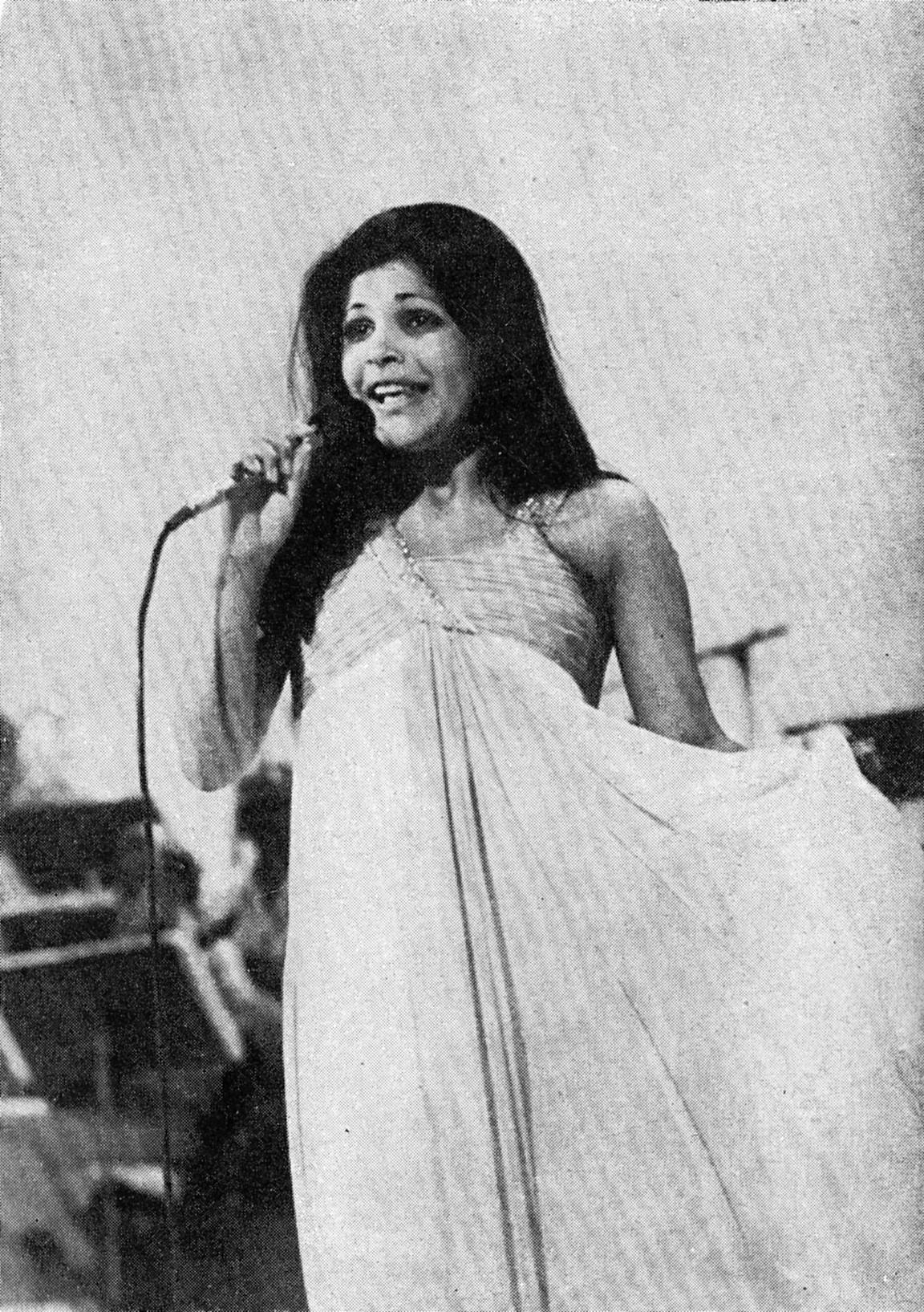

Background information
- Born: December 14, 1946 (age 79); Bucharest, Romania
- Genres: Jazz, Funk, Soul, Folk, Disco
- Occupation: Musician
- Instrument: Vocals
- Years active: 1959–present
- Labels: Electrecord, Four Leaf

Aura Urziceanu (born Bucharest, 14 December 1946), also known as Aura, is a Romanian pop star who was famous in the 1970s and 1980s. In America she had performed as Urziceanu-Rully and Aura Rully.

She has toured and performed with artists such as Bill Evans, Duke Ellington, Ella Fitzgerald, Ahmad Jamal, Hank Jones, Thad Jones, Dizzy Gillespie, Quincy Jones, Paul Desmond, Joe Pass and Mel Lewis.

== Career ==
As reported in the 25 November issue of RPM Weekly, Aura had released her album Special Way which was recorded at Toronto's Sounds Interchange with engineer Rick Capreol and producer Jeff Smith. It was released on the Change Records label. It was doing well with airplay on both AM and FM stations. A track from the album, "L.A. Sunshine" (a Jim Mancel composition) was gaining popularity in the disco markets.
