= Syd Kessler =

Canadian businessman

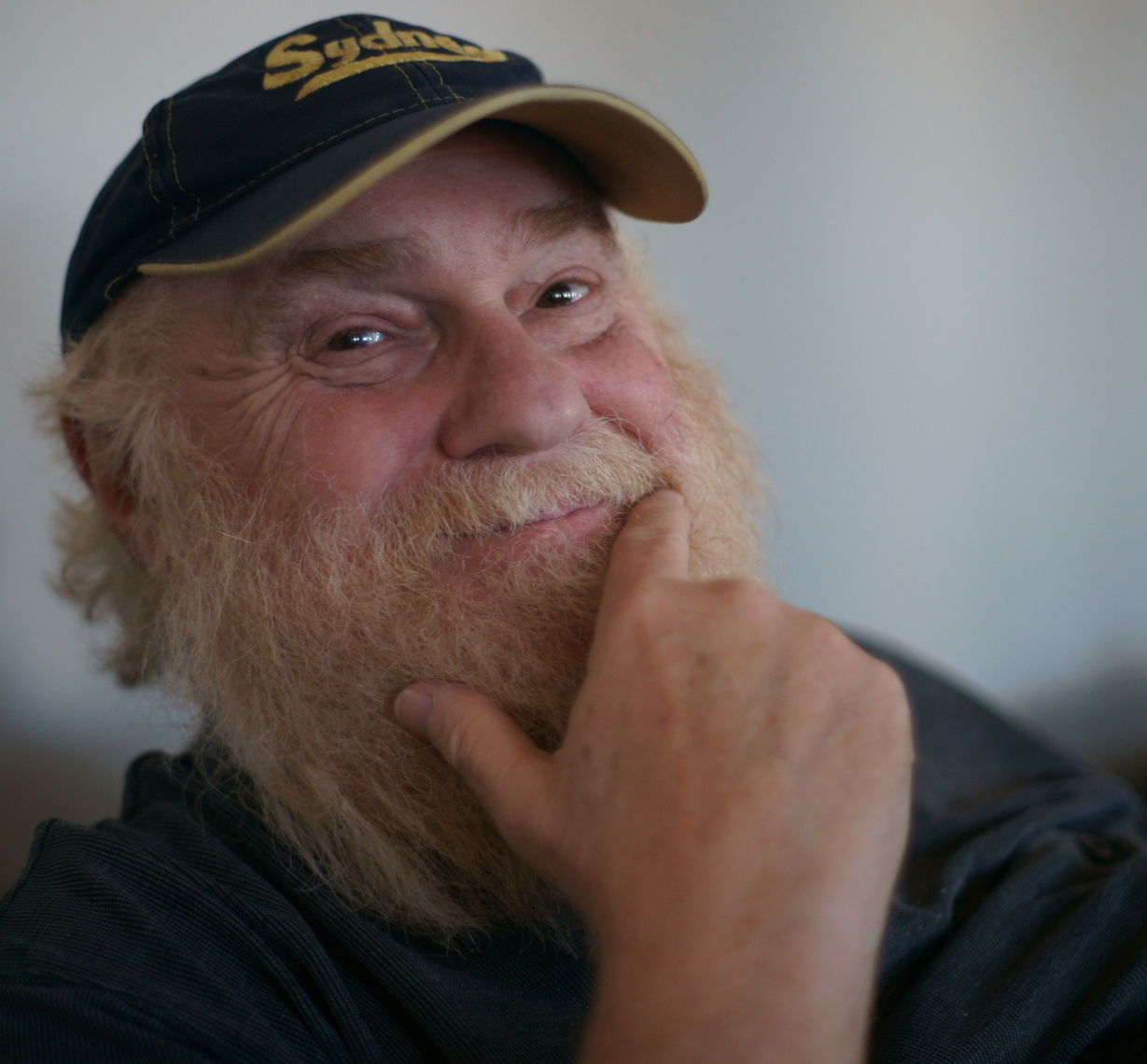
- Syd Kessler
- Born: April 2, 1946; Hamilton, Ontario, Canada
- Died: March 7, 2021 (aged 74)
- Occupations: Businessman, writer
- Spouse: Ellen Kessler
- Children: 2
- Writing career
- Years active: 1970-Present

Syd Kessler (1949–2021) was a Canadian businessperson and writer.

== Career ==
In 1970-71, Hatos/Hall – the producers of the legendary game show Let's Make a Deal – hired him to develop a game show (The Crosswits) styled after a crossword puzzle. This show ran on ABC for six seasons.

Kessler then started his own business and was president of Kessler Productions between 1974 to 1978, producing and writing creative radio commercials exclusively for the Canadian marketplace. The company continued to grow, and Kessler took in other partners. The company changed its name to Kessler Music Inc. In 1980, Kessler Music Corp purchased Change Records and its parent company, Sounds Interchange.Kessler served as president of the corporation until 1981, when he merged with the two top audio production companies in Canada and became the dominant player in the marketplace. This new company was called The Air Company, and Kessler was its president from 1981 to 1988. In this period, the company won Canadian and International awards such as the I.B.A.s, The Bessies, The One Show, etc.

In 1988, John Labatt Ltd., a multinational Canadian corporation, with over $3 billion CAD in revenue, joint ventured with Kessler Music to create a new entity called Supercorp. Starting revenues of this company was $10 million. In four years the revenues rose to $150 million. Supercorp dominated the commercial production business, this time in all aspects of advertising production. Supercorp owned the following premiere enterprises: HYP&N, The Partners Film Company and all its subsidiaries, The Animation House, Sounds Interchange Recording Studios, and The Air Company. Supercorp controlled 68 percent of all advertising production in Canada and 2% of the television commercial production business in the U.S. Aside from his senior management responsibilities as President and CEO, Syd also consulted in the retail sector of advertising. He became known as a respected specialist/problem solver, working with such clients as Saffer Advertising, Black's Photography, Esso, Carson Pirie, Towers, etc. During this time, Kessler was the creative marketing force behind the new positioning of the Canadian Broadcasting Corporation. Their “GO PUBLIC” campaign was conceived and produced by him.

Following a change in corporate direction at Labatt's in 1994, Kessler sold his shares in Supercorp and started a new company called The Kessler Group, which was created to address a growing need in the advertising community to move away from the broadcast advertising model, with its inherent inability to deliver measurable results, to a new advertising model called narrowcasting; narrowcasting takes advantage of new digital technologies’ ability to cost-effectively tailor advertising messages to individuals, producing improved and fully measurable results.

Kessler became co-director of KPMG e-commerce practice in 1997.

== Books ==
- The Perfect System (Stoddart Publishing)
- The Perfect System of Parenting (Bastian Books)
- The Master Builder, co-written with Michael Berg
- Vibes, co-written with David Morrison
