= Freaks of Nature (film) =

- Theatrical release poster
- Directed by: Robbie Pickering
- Written by: Oren Uziel
- Produced by: Matt Tolmach
- Starring: Nicholas Braun; Mackenzie Davis; Josh Fadem; Joan Cusack; Bob Odenkirk; Patton Oswalt; Ed Westwick; Vanessa Hudgens; Denis Leary
- Cinematography: Uta Briesewitz
- Edited by: Craig Alpert
- Music by: Fil Eisler
- Production companies: Columbia Pictures; Matt Tolmach Productions; LStar Capital
- Distributed by: Sony Pictures Releasing
- Release date: October 30, 2015
- Running time: 92 minutes
- Country: United States
- Language: English
- Budget: $33 million
- Box office: $70,958

Freaks of Nature is a 2015 American comedy horror film directed by Robbie Pickering and written by Oren Uziel. It stars Nicholas Braun, Mackenzie Davis, Josh Fadem, Joan Cusack, Bob Odenkirk, Keegan-Michael Key, Ed Westwick, Patton Oswalt, Vanessa Hudgens and Denis Leary. The film was issued in a limited release by Columbia Pictures on October 30, 2015.

The film follows three high-school outcasts whose social alienation is compounded when they join rival species in a town inhabited by humans, vampires, and zombies. Aliens set the species against each other, and the outcasts try to band everyone together to fight the invaders.

== Plot ==
The town of Dillford, Ohio, is home to three species who despise each other: humans, vampires, and zombies. Vampires are at the top of the food chain, both literally and in social circles, and tend to be the cooler kids in town. The zombies are able to leave their ghetto with special collars that keep them compliant. The humans languish somewhere in the middle, intimidated by the vampires while seeing the zombies as second-class citizens. All seem to have their own communities and rules by which they keep a tense truce.

School nerd Dag Parker sets out to lose his virginity with Lorelei, the hottest girl in school to prove he isn't a loser. He has issues with Rick Wilson, the baseball coach and manager of the local meat factory. Rick fired all of the human employees, including Dag's mother, and replaced them with zombies as cheap labor. Rick taunts him with this as Dag practices his pitching and he chokes and ends up hitting one of the star athletes, injuring him severely.

Dag's hippy parents try to cheer him up with a speech about the men in his family being late bloomers. When the euphemisms about puberty and "huge changes" make Dag uncomfortable, he stops his well-meaning parents and tries to forget about the conversation.

Meanwhile, social outcast Petra Lane is seduced and transformed into a vampire after being bitten by Milan - the high school's playboy vampire - while they are making out. Later he rejects her when she wants to make the relationship permanent, leaving her alone and now a vampire with no idea how to cope.

Dag's former best friend Ned Mosley, the brother of the athlete Dag injured, is also a social outcast at high school. He is one of the smartest people in the town but is ostracized by his sport-loving father and receives only contempt from his teachers. Following an argument with his family, Ned visits the zombie ghetto and he allows a female teenage zombie to bite his leg, transforming him into a zombie so he doesn't have to think or be smart anymore.

Just as Dag is finally about to score with Lorelei, out of nowhere aliens invade Dillford, causing residents to believe that the vampires, zombies, and humans are attacking each other. This causes an all-out war between the three groups that envelopes the town in a free for all of vampires vs. humans vs. zombies.

Dag and Lorelei hide in a house which is raided by a group of vampires and Lorelei is seemingly killed by Petra, who has always been jealous of her. In subsequent brawls between the factions, Dag, Ned, and Petra reluctantly join and hide in Stuart Miller's basement, Stuart being the local doomsday nut. While sheltering from the invasion, Petra and Ned are overcome by hunger and eat Stuart and his mother.

The aliens are able to determine their location, causing them to seek cover at the high school. Ned and Dag fight about their former friendship and Dag not wanting to be a loser anymore so they stop being friends. Ned, who is still a genius despite his non-verbal zombie status, leaves angrily. Later Petra and Dag become trapped and begin to make out, but he flinches as Petra goes to kiss his neck. Petra angrily accuses him of being afraid of her, but the conversation is cut short when the aliens find them again. Dag realizes that the aliens can only see inorganic materials, such as their synthetic clothing. The three then strip and run to Dag's house, where they change into organic cotton clothes kept by Dag's hippie mother.

Later, Dag, Petra, and Ned are captured by the aliens. They are placed with other captured residents in a warehouse, with force fields segregating the humans, vampires, and zombies. Dag and Petra find that instead of dying, Lorelei has been changed into a hot vampire, which intimidates Petra. After figuring out the weakness in the force field keeping them apart, Dag, Ned, and Petra convince everyone to band together to fight the aliens and destroy the force field.

At Rick Wilson's meat factory, the chemical "Tetrafluoraxipan" is used to transform horse cartilage into a meat-like substance and is what the aliens are after. Dag convinces Rick to let the town into the factory, as the aliens arrive and submerge in the chemical, combining to grow into a single large alien. It begins to make a speech about how they just wanted to ask nicely for the chemical, but the town's residents reacted badly and tried to attack each other. So the aliens locked the citizens up to protect them from each other. Then the alien starts quoting We Didn't Start the Fire by Billy Joel to scold the residents for their behavior. Petra insults the alien for his condescending attitude and points out it was them who scared everybody else, inspiring Rick to throw a torque wrench at the creature. Furious, the alien attacks the crowd, hitting people with its huge hands. As the group runs, Keller is smashed and Petra is knocked into a hose, accidentally dislodging a spray of liquid ammonia. The ammonia starts to melt the giant alien and Dag quickly gets people to grab more hoses and spray as much ammonia on the alien as possible.

Meanwhile, Milan corners Petra and attempts to kill her. Dag sees this and, remembering Petra's words about hesitating, immediately jumps on Milan. Dag manages to throw a couple of punches, but Milan quickly overpowers him. At that moment, the clouds move to reveal a full moon. The moonlight touches Dag and his body suddenly starts changing into a werewolf, the change his parents were trying to explain earlier. With his new powers, Dag fights Milan again in a fair match. After exchanging a few hits, Milan comes after Dag with a knife, but Dag dodges just in time and Milan ends up impaled on a wooden spike, instantly exploding.

As the outclassed alien shrinks back to its mini size, it attempts to escape by spaceship and launches a bomb to destroy the town. Surprisingly, Ned catches the bomb and gives it to Dag who then pitches it through the ship closing . The ship then explodes, destroying the aliens.

Everyone in town returns to their normal lives. Lorelei asks Dag out on a date, but Dag chooses to be with Petra instead. Ned is happier and better adjusted as a zombie and seems to have bonded with his star athlete brother who has also become a zombie.

== Cast ==
- Nicholas Braun as human (later, werewolf) Dag Parker
  - Jacob Eddington as young Dag
- Mackenzie Davis as human (later, vampire) Petra Lane
- Josh Fadem as human (later, zombie) Ned Mosely
  - Max Wright as young Ned
- Joan Cusack as Peg Parker
- Bob Odenkirk as Shooter Parker
- Keegan-Michael Key as Mr Mayhew P. Keller
- Ed Westwick as Milan Pinache
- Patton Oswalt as Stuart Miller
- Vanessa Hudgens as human (later, vampire) Lorelei
- Denis Leary as Rick Wilson
- Ian Roberts as human (later, zombie) Chaz Mosely Sr.
- Utkarsh Ambudkar as Parminder
- Cerina Vincent as Daisy
- Chris Zylka as Chaz Mosely Jr.
- Rachael Harris as Mrs Mosely
- Mae Whitman as Jenna Zombie
- Werner Herzog as the voice of the Perfect Being
- Derek Mears as the wolf
- Aurora Perrineau as the vampiress
- Pat Healy as the zombie priest
- Lilith Fury as a vampire in the cage
- Natalie Palamides as Kathy Murch
- John Ennis as Coach Pulcifer

== Production ==
The film entered development as The Kitchen Sink. In March 2011, Jonah Hill was reported to be in talks to make his directorial debut with The Kitchen Sink. In February 2012, Robbie Pickering was chosen as the director for the film, though Hill would stay attached to the film as one of the executive producers. The film was renamed from Kitchen Sink to Freaks of Nature.

=== Casting ===
In January 2013, it was reported that Nicholas Braun was in talks to join the film as well as Chris Zylka. In July of that same year, it was announced Vanessa Hudgens was in talks to join the film, as well as Denis Leary. On August 15, 2013, it was announced Ed Westwick was in talks to join the film. On August 19, 2013, it was announced Patton Oswalt, Bob Odenkirk, and Ian Roberts, Keegan-Michael Key, and Mackenzie Davis had all joined the cast of the film.

=== Filming ===
Principal photography took place in Los Angeles, California, and in Vancouver, British Columbia. Shooting began on August 15, 2013, and lasted 37 days. Shooting locations in Los Angeles included Santa Clarita, Temple City and Van Nuys High School. Vancouver locations included Steveston, Metrotown Mall and A.R. Macneill Secondary School.

== Release ==
The film was initially scheduled for release on January 9, 2015. In October 2014, Sony pushed it back to September 4, 2015. On October 16, 2015, Sony announced it would have a limited release on October 30, 2015.

== Soundtrack ==
- "My Life Is Right" by Big Star
- "Fever Dreaming" by No Age
- "Days" by The Drums
- "Kill for Love" by The Chromatics
- "It's Simply Love" by The Longo Brothers
- "On My Mind" by CharlieRED
- "Deceive"' by Trentemøller
- "Moments of Love" by Debbie Martin
- "The Heat" by Jungle
- "Jump on It" by SweatBeatz
- "Germ-Free Adolescents" by X-Ray Spex
- "Evil Soul" by The Young Werewolves
- "User" by KOVAS
- "Fall in Love Again" by Fuzzy Dora
- "We Didn't Start the Fire" by Billy Joel
- "Born on a Saturday Night" by Mean Jeans
- "It's Alright, It's OK" by Primal Scream

== Critical reception ==
Tim Janson of The SciFi Movie Page gave the film 2 stars out of 5 citing, "The ideal way to watch the film would be with your hand on the fast-forward button, stopping when Key, Leary, Odenkirk, and Oswalt are on screen and skipping through when they are not."

On the review aggregator website Rotten Tomatoes, 0% of 5 critics' reviews are positive, with an average rating of 2.6/10.
