= Lessons of Love (album) =

1981 album by Guidonna Lee

Studio album by Guidonna Lee
- Released: 1981
- Studio: Eastern Sound
- Label: Sefel Records SEF 1000
- Producer: Joseph Sefel

Lessons of Love is a 1981 album by Guidonna Lee. It contains two charting singles by her. Some tracks from the album were used in the films Stone Cold Dead and The Kidnapping of the President.

== Background ==
It was reported in the 16 August 1980 issue of RPM Weekly that Guidonna Lee, the first pop artist signed to Sefel Records was in the process of recording her first album at the Eastern Sound studio. The acting producer was veteran engineer Ken Friesen.

When the record was released, Joseph Sefel was credited as the executive producer.

As reported in the 10 October 1981 issue of RPM Weekly that Guidonna Lee was on release with her album. The record was released in 1981 on Sefel Records SEF 1000 and distributed by Distributed by Almada Corp.

== Singles ==
- "You Never Saw Me Crying" / "Do You Dream" was released on Sefel 45–001 in 1980. It charted on the RPM Adult Oriented Playlist from 4 October to 22 November reaching No. 25. It also registered on the RPM Country 75 Singles chart from 4 October to 6 December, where it reached no. 34. The song also appears in the film, The Kidnapping of the President. "Do You Dream?" was also used in the film.
- "Second Hand Emotion" / "Children of the Night" was released on Sefel 45-002. At week-thirteen, for the week of 25 April, it peaked at No. 8 on the RPM Adult Oriented CanCon chart. The B side "Children of the Night" was used in the 1979 film, Stone Cold Dead.

== Track listing ==
A

1. "Jamie's Song" - Guidonna Lee – 3:18
2. "Cryin' in the Rain" - Carole King / Greenfield – 3:04
3. "Cant Let You Go" - Guidonna Lee – 3:26
4. "Lessons Of Love" - Guidonna Lee – 3:14
5. "Children Of the Night" - Guidonna Lee – 3:14

B

1. "Second Hand Emotion" - Guidonna Lee – 3:01
2. "Never Saw Me Cryin'" - Guidonna Lee – 3:15
3. "Do You Dream" - Guidonna Lee – 2:45
4. "Paper Chains" - Guidonna Lee – 3:53
5. "Fly Me Away" - Guidonna Lee – 4:18

== Credits ==
=== Musicians ===
- Guidonna Lee: vocals, backing vocals
- Mike (Pepe) Francis: guitar
- Peter Marley: guitar
- Peter Follet: guitar
- Dennis Pendrith: bass
- Steve Duben: bass
- Barry Keane: drums
- Bob Disalle: drums
- Jorn Andersen: drums
- Kenton Hall: steel guitar
- Jonathan Goldsmith: synthesizers, electric piano
- Michael Hefferman: keyboards
- Coleena Philips: backing vocals
- Sharon Lee Williams: backing vocals
- Shawn Jackson: backing vocals
- Ted Alexander: keyboards, backing vocals
- Bruce Thomson: backing vocals
- Kurt Kellen: French horn

=== Arrangement, production, technical ===
- String arrangements by Peter Cardinali, Eric Robertson, and Jonathan Goldsmith
- Electronic strings by The Armin String Quartet
- Engineered by Mark Holden, assisted by Fraser Hill and Rhonda Lee Kohler
- Recorded at Thunder Road Studios, Calgary, Alberta and Eastern Sound, Toronto, Ontario
- Musical direction by Allan Bell
- Mixed by Howard Steele at Thunder Road Studios, Calgary, Alberta
- Mastered by Rich Donaldson at 1/2 speed at I.A.M., Los Angeles, California, USA
- Design, art direction by A. Hordos Designs Ltd.
- Photography by Antony Attanya
