= Deal Me In (album) =

Studio album by Van Dyke
- Released: 1977
- Studios: Sounds Interchange Studios, Toronto
- Label: Change Records CLP-8001
- Producer: John James Stewart

Van Dyke chronology
Deal Me In (1977)	Another...Van Dyke (1978)

Deal Me In is a 1977 album by singer Van Dyke. It contained the charting hit singles "This Love Song", "They Call Her Easy" and "All Cried Out".

== Background ==
Deal Me In was Van Dyke's debut album. It was produced by John Stewart of Change Records at Sounds Interchange Studios in Toronto. Mike Jones was the engineer. It was also the first release that Change Records had released. On 25 November, a celebration organized by Change Records for the release of the album was held at Sounds Interchange. Among the attendees were representatives from Polydor Records, the Canadian distributors for Change Records.

As reported in the 11 February 1978 issue of RPM Weekly, Van Dyke was gaining good ground in the country market with his single, "This Love Song" and "Ridin' High", another single was taken from Deal Me In as the follow up.

It was released in Canada on Change CLP 8001 in 1977. It was also released in Australia on 7 Records MLF 273 in 1978.

== Reception ==
In reference to the album, Johnny Murphy in his RPM Weekly feature Keep it Country wrote that Van Dyke had the ability to write and sing refreshing, exciting songs.

The album was reviewed in the 17 December issue of RPM Weekly. It was well-received and described as a "bit of country, a bit of rock, a bit of classical, a bit of blues and some may say a bit of a mess". But the reviewer said to forget the latter. The reviewer also wrote that Van Dyke's move into country was smooth and well thought out with the drawcard being the single release of "This Love Song" backed with "Bought and Sold".

== Airplay ==
By 19 November, the album was receiving airplay in Toronto. There was an indication that "This Love Song" had the potential to be a solid hit. It was seeing action at CFGM in Toronto and charting.

It was reported in the 18 March issue of RPM Weekly that the album had gained airplay in all formats. This was down to the material on the album, which besides country was pop and even progressive. Certain tracks on the album were receiving AOR, top 40, MOR and country airplay. The current single from the album was "They Call Her Easy" which was written by Harry Chapin. It was backed with Van Dyke's own country genre composition, "Ridin' High". "They Call Her Easy" had gained major market airplay at stations CKXL, CFCN and CJAY-FM, all stations in Calgary; CHED Edmonton, CKY and CKY-FM in Winnipeg, CING-FM in Burlington, CKWS in Kingston, and CHER and CJCB in Sydney, Nova Scotia. The other side of "They Call Her Easy", "Ridin' High" had been added to the playlists of various AM and FM country stations. "This Love Song" was still charting at No. 16 at CHMM-FM in Winnipeg and CKFH in Toronto was still playing it.

== Charting songs ==
- "This Love Song" debuted at No. 41 on the RPM Country Playlist chart for the week of 21 January 1978.
- "They Call Her Easy" debuted at No. 49 on the RPM Adult Oriented Playlist for the week of 18 March.
- "Ridin' High", the other side of "They Call Her Easy" debuted at No. 46 on the RPM Country Playlist chart for the week of 18 March.
  Along with "Daylight Katy" by Gordon Lightfoot and "Survival" by Marc Jordan, "They Call Her Easy" was one of the three Rock-Oriented Action Singles for the week of 29 April. It also debuted at No. 100 on the RPM 100 Top Singles chart that week.
- "All Cried Out" debuted at No. 73 on the RPM Country Week Singles chart for the week of 30 September 1978.

== Track listing ==
A

1. "Singin' the Blues" - 2:50
2. "This Love Song" - 2:45
3. "They Call Her Easy" - 4:25
4. "All Cried Out" - 2:45
5. "Til the Morning" - 2:50
6. "Gone Crazy" - 4:23

B

1. "Ridin' High" - 2:20
2. "Deal Me In" - 3:30
3. "I Love to Hear You Listen" - 2:50
4. "Bought & Sold" - 3:05
5. "Drink Up - Be Somebody" - 2:20
6. "Help Yourself" - 6:45

== Album credits ==
=== Musicians ===
- Bob Van Dyke: vocals, electric guitar, acoustic guitar
- Danny ‘Slide’ McBride: lead guitar, backing band
- Bob Mann: electric guitar, acoustic guitar
- Eric Robertson: keyboards
- Bob Lucier: pedal steel guitar
- Marty "I’m Never Late for a Gig’ Warsh": violin, fiddle, backing vocals
- Brian Leonard: drums, percussion
- Susan Anspach: backing vocals

=== Arrangements ===
- Arranged by Jeff Smith
- Keyboards arranged by Eric Robertson

=== Production ===
- Produced by John James Stewart
