= Joseph Sefel =

Businessman and music industry executive

- Born: January 1934; Magyarkeszi, Hungary
- Died: 11 May 2021 (aged 87)
- Occupation: Businessman

Joseph Seffel was a businessman and music industry executive. He is the founder of the Canadian Sefel Records label.

== Background ==
Sefel was a farm boy from Hungary. In the small village where he was growing up, it was customary for boys to follow the occupation that their fathers went into. There was no high school in that area as well. Sefel and his older brother had higher ambitions. So, his brother made his way to a college near the Austrian border and crammed four years' worth of study into a twelve-month course. Seffel had agreed to stay home for a year. He would follow his brother without the blessing of his parents. While at the school, he came across professors from other universities who were recruiting. At the school was a professor from Budapest who taught geophysics. Being a farm boy who loved being outside, the outside aspect of geophysics work would suit him, and geophysics became the choice of study for him.

In 1956, Sefel gained his master's degree in geophysics. A month later in October, a revolution took place and Hungary became a Communist state. A month later Sefel and his girlfriend escaped to Austria. However, there were too many Hungarians already there which limited his opportunities. Some days later they seized on an opportunity to go to England. Now newly-weds, Sefel and his wife secured their own residence instead of staying in a Hungarian refugee camp. They lived off of his wages as a janitor at an Oxford Street department store. He later met another student from Hungary who arranged for him to attend interviews by two oil companies and a geophysical firm. He had difficulties with the interviews as he didn't speak English and had to use interpreters. However, for the geophysical firm interview, he attended it on his own. This resulted in a job offer. At that time, Sefel and his wife had an offer to go to Canada. He declined the offer but then discovered that the company was willing to keep a position in Calgary open for him.

Ten years after coming to Calgary, he had enough experience in the business to go out on his own. It was a failure and in his words he lost his shirt and pants. He had to go back to working for someone else. In 1970, he tried going out on his own again. This time, the consulting firm he headed was prosperous and expanded. By 1981, his company included 900 employees operating from offices in Calgary, Denver and London England. Under the umbrella was a real estate company that engaged in construction and a recording company in Montreal.

== Career ==
It was reported in the 6 March 1979 issue of The Calgary Herald that his Sefel Group had purchased a Calgary-based Geophysical firm. They had purchased all of the outstanding shares of Central Development Exploration Ltd. (CDX) for an undisclosed sum. This resulted in the creation of the Oil Industry's largest Canadian-owned international service organization.

In 1980, he founded Sefel Records. Also that year, Sefel Records had lunched a takeover bid on the Almada Corporation.

Sefel was the executive producer for Guidonna Lee's Lessons of Love album that was released in 1981.

== Death ==
Sefel died on 11 May 2021 at age 87.
