= George Mendeluk =

Canadian director (born 1948)

- Born: March 20, 1948 (age 78); Augsburg, Germany
- Occupations: Director, writer, producer
- Years active: 1972–present

George Mendeluk (Ukrainian: Джордж Менделюк) (born March 20, 1948, in Augsburg, Bavaria) is a German-born Canadian film director, television director and writer of Ukrainian descent.

His television credits as director include Miami Vice, Night Heat, The New Alfred Hitchcock Presents, The Young Riders, Counterstrike, Kung Fu: The Legend Continues, Hercules: The Legendary Journeys, Poltergeist: The Legacy, Highlander: The Series, Highlander: The Raven, Queen of Swords, First Wave, Relic Hunter, Romeo!, Odyssey 5, Deck the Halls (2005) and Judicial Indiscretion (2007).

Mendeluk directed Bitter Harvest, a 2017 period romantic-drama film set in Soviet Ukraine in the early 1930s. The film is the first English language feature film depicting Ukraine's famine, the 1932–33 Holodomor.

== Filmography ==
- 1972 - The Merry Wives of Tobias Rouke (co-writer)
- 1979 - Stone Cold Dead
- 1980 - The Kidnapping of the President
- 1985 - Doin' Time
- 1986 - Meatballs III: Summer Job
- 1992 - Gangsters
- 1995 - Bolt
- 1997 - Mission Genesis (7 episodes)
- 1998 - Men of Means
- 2005 - Secret Lives
- 2005 - Deck the Halls
- 2006 - Presumed Dead
- 2006 - 12 Hours to Live
- 2006 - Her Fatal Flaw
- 2006 - Under the Mistletoe
- 2007 - Secrets of an Undercover Wife
- 2007 - Judicial Indiscretion
- 2007 - Destination: Infestation a.k.a. Deadly Swarm a.k.a. Ants on a Plane
- 2007 - I Know What I Saw a.k.a. Post Mortem
- 2008 - Nightmare at the End of the Hall
- 2008 - The Secret Lives of the Second Wives
- 2008 - Riddles of the Sphinx
- 2008 - Desperate Hours: An Amber Alert
- 2009 - Storm Seekers
- 2009 - Desperate Escape
- 2017 - Bitter Harvest
- 2017 - The Wrong Babysitter
