= Dwayne Ford =

- Occupation: Musician
- Labels: Epic Records, Sefel Records
- Formerly of: The Hawks, Atkinson Danko and Ford with Brockie and Hilton, Bearfoot, Toronto Rhythm Section, Star

Dwayne Ford is a Canadian rock musician. He was a member of various Canadian bands. He later embarked on a solo career.

== Background ==
Ford was born in Edmonton, Alberta on 7 October 1949 to American parents. As a child he studied classical piano. By his mid-teens, he had learnt to play competently on keyboards, guitar, drums, and had good vocal skills.

In the late 1960s, he was a member of the Canadian group and live attraction, the Nomads. Having moved to Toronto in 1970, he became part of Ronnie Hawkins' Rock and Roll Revival and Travelling Medicine Show.

== Career ==
=== 1970s ===
In the early 1970s, Ford was part of an ensemble that would eventually become Bearfoot. In June 1975, Dwayne Ford and Bearfoot played at the Exibition Auditorium.

Working with producer Bob Gallo, Ford recorded "Let it Burn". It was backed with his own composition "Justine" and released on Columbia C4 4113 in July 1976. For the week of 10 July, it was playlisted at CHAB in Moose Jaw, and a Breakout Market Addition at CHED at Edmonton and CKY in Winnipeg. Along with "Sweet Love" by the Bandit Stampeders and "The Queen" by Nannette Workman, it was one of the three Hitmakers at both CHED and CKY.

In 1977 Ford went on tour with Donovan.

=== 1980s ===
It was reported in the 29 March 1980 issue of RPM Weekly that Ford was to score the music for a new Canadian film, Anatomy of Horror. He was writing the lead songs for the film.

Ford recorded "Roll Me Away" which was written by him. It was released on Hot Vinyl HV1001A. It was a recommended pop single in the 19 July 1980 issue of Billboard. Ford's single "Roll Me Away" debuted at No. 100 on the RPM Top 100 Singles chart for the week of 2 August 1980. It also debuted at No. 18 on the RPM CanCon chart for the week of 6 September.

Ford recorded the single "Seven Men from Texas". It made the RPM Adult Oriented CanCon chart and for the week of 7 February 1981, in its third charting week, it was at No. 22.

It was reported in the 13 October 1981 issue of RPM Weekly that Ford, a recent signee to Sefel Records was to have his Needless Freaking album released. The album was produced by himself, Ken Friesen and David Foster. The album which included musicians such as Steve Lukather and Mike Porcaro was a labor of love for him. Along with Cravings by Daniel Lavoie, I'm as Guilty as You by Brian Plummer, and Lessons of Love by Guidonna Lee, Ford's Needless Freaking was a representation of the expansion into pop field that Sefel Records had made.

In early 1982 Ford's single "Lovin' and Losing You" / "The Best Will Survive" was released on Sefel Records 45-007.

Ford recorded his composition "The Hurricane" which was backed with "Lovin' and Losin' You" and released on Epic E4-8471 in 1982. It was on the playlists of CFMI-FM and CKGM in Montreal for the week of 27 March.

=== 1990s - 2020s ===
In 2009, Ford released his On the Other Side album.
