= Brian Chater =

- Born: Sutton England
- Died: 5 September 2013
- Occupations: Music industry executive, record producer, consultant

Brian Chater was an English born Canadian music industry executive, record label founder and record producer whose long career began in England and continued in Canada.

== Background ==
Brian Chater was born in Sutton, England. During his career, Chater had worked as a record executive, music publisher, a music industry association president and professional consultant. He had a number of awards named after him which include the Brian Chater Leadership Award, the Brian Chater Industry Award, and the Brian Chater Builder Award.

== Career ==
=== 1960s ===
At age 21, Chater was Mills Music in London, England was working as the Copyright Manager of Mills Music in London, England.

In the mid-1960s, he moved to Canada and ran Burlington Music. As reported in the 11 December 1965 issue of Cashbox, Englishman Charter had brought considerable experience in publishing to his new position.

Chater produced the In The Beginning... album for psychedelic rock band from Montreal, Quebec, British North America Act. It was released on Now Records in 1969.

=== 1970s ===
In September 1970 Chater founded the Montréal-based Much Records.

It was reported in the 12 January 1974 issue of Billboard that Chater of Summerlea/Winterlea Music, the publishing arm of Much Productions had announced a signed agreement with Sam Trust of ATV Music Corp. This agreement was for ATV Music Corp. to represent Chater's company for the Canadian market.

Much Records ceased operations in 1974 when Chater directed his efforts towards his new company B.C. Music Management.

In January 1978, Chater was at MIDEM representing his Montreal-based firm, BJC Music Management. He valued MIDEM as it was a good way of making contact with people from all over the world. He said that there were two ways of making contacts. One was by taking a world trip and the other was by going to MIDEM.

=== 1980s ===
==== Avenue Road Music Group, Avalon Records ====
Chater and lawyer Edmund Glinert formed the Avenue Road Music Group which was located at 120 Avenue Road, Toronto, Ontario. As reported in the September-October 1981 issue of Music Scene, the new organization company would represent a number of songwriters and had plans to administer the publishing activities of independent companies. Under the umbrella of the org. was a new company, Roehampton Music. Another subsidiary of Avenue Road Music Group (ARMG) was Avalon Records. The records were distributed by PolyGram Canada.

Nancy Nash's Letting Go album was produced by herself and her manager Fred Dalgleish. It was released in 1982 on both Avalon Music AVE 1011 and Sefel SEF 1011.

A Girl Next Door aka The Girl Next Door was a group who had recorded two songs under producer Don Hamilton-Stevens. Their single "Heartbeat"/"Tell Me" Was released on Avalon AVN-102 in 1982 Later that year Sefel Records picked it up for wider distribution.

Mary Lu Zahalan who had previously been with Heart Records and Sefel Records came to Avalon Records. Her album Think of Me and single "If I Had One Wish" were released on the label.

=== 1990s - 2000s ===
It was reported in the 8-13 May 1989 issue of RPM Weekly that executive director of CIRPA Brian Chater had been appointed to the board of directors of FACTOR. He had previously held the position of director from to 1985.

From 2004 to 2007 Chater was a Director of Radio Starmaker Fund. He was also a consultant to the CPCC (Canadian Private Copying Collective).

== Death ==
Chater died on 5 September 2013 at age 73.

== Awards ==
- The Canadian Songwriters Award from the Songwriters Association of Canada (1993)
- Canadian Music Industry Hall of Fame Award (2000)
- Special Achievement Award from SOCAN (2003)
