= Mary Lu Zahalan =

Canadian rock singer and actress

- Born: 1958; Renfrew, Ontario, Canada
- Died: 27 May 2023 (aged 64–65)
- Genres: Country, pop, rock
- Occupations: Singer, actress, author, professor
- Labels: Sefel Records, Avalon Records, Heart Records, MaZa Records, Justin Entertainment Inc., Iron Music Group Inc.
- Website: www.maryluzahalan.com

Mary Lu Zahalan (25 October 1958 – 27 May 2023) was a Canadian rock singer and actress.

== Background ==
Born in Renfrew, Ontario, and raised in Oakville, Zahalan was a Miss Canada finalist in 1975 before embarking on a career as an entertainer. She had entered the contest as a class project while taking a personal improvement class at Sheridan College to overcome her shyness; what she ultimately took away from the competition was an interest in the theatrical production aspects of the experience, so she then enrolled in the college's musical theatre program.

== Career ==
She released her debut album, Think of Me, in 1982. As reported in the 7 August 1982 issue of RPM Weekly, she was a guest on second edition of radio CKAN's program "Canadian Made", where for the first time on Canadian radio, tracks from her album were played. The host of the program was Dean Burton. According to CKAN, the material from her album drew a favorable response from listeners. For the album, she received a Juno Award nomination for Most Promising Female Vocalist at the Juno Awards of 1983.

In 1985, she performed vocals on Visible, the final album by rock band CANO, and toured with the band to promote the album. In this era, she also had various acting roles in musical theatre.

In 1990, she released the album Zahalan on MCA Records, and enjoyed moderate success with the single "I Can't Forget About You" on Canadian radio. Another song from the album "While We're Still Young" debuted at No. 9 on the RPM Weekly Cancon to Watch chart for the week of 11 May 1991. It peaked at No. 6 for the week of 25 May and held that position until 8 June during its five-week run.

She later returned to Sheridan College as a music teacher. She also had supporting roles in film and television, including in the television films Woman on the Run: The Lawrencia Bembenek Story and Alley Cats Strike.

In January 2011, Zahalan graduated from Liverpool Hope University with a master's degree in a program that studied the Beatles. She was the first graduate of the program. She subsequently directed Becoming the Beatles, a live musical documentary about the history of the Beatles.

== Illness and death ==
On 27 May 2023, Zahalan died from cancer at the age of 66.

== Discography ==
=== Studio albums ===
- Think of Me (1982)
- Zahalan (1990)

=== Singles ===
Year	Single	Peak chart positions		Album
Year	Single	CAN	CAN AC	Album
1982	"Try a Little Love Sometime"	—	29	Think of Me
1982	"Turn of the Wheel"	—	25	Think of Me
1982	"If I Had One Wish"	—	19	Think of Me
1985	"Call Me"	—	11	Non-LP single
1985	"A.M. Girl (In An F.M. World)"	—	—	Non-LP single
1990	"I Can't Forget About You"	66	24	Zahalan
1991	"Fallen Angel"	90	—	Zahalan
1991	"While We're Still Young"	—	—	Zahalan
