= Nancy Nash =

Canadian blues and pop singer

- Born: 17 June 1955 (age 71); Canada
- Genres: Blues, pop
- Occupation: Singer
- Labels: Mustard, Nash Records, Sefel Records, Avalon Records

Nancy Nash is a Canadian blues and pop singer, who has recorded and performed both under her birth name and as Sazacha Red Sky. Under the latter name, she garnered a Juno Award nomination for Best Music of Aboriginal Canada Recording at the Juno Awards of 1994. Initially nominated for her recording of Chief Dan George's "The Prayer Song", the nomination was revised to reflect her album Red Sky Rising after she was accused of cultural appropriation by George's family.

== Early career ==
Nash was born June 17, 1955, and raised in North Battleford, Saskatchewan, and spent her early career working in Edmonton, Alberta. Associated with the blues band Hot Cottage in the 1970s, she was given her own half-hour CBC Television special as part of the variety series Points East, Points West in 1976. She released her debut album, Natural Born, in 1978.

It was reported in the 21 February 1981 issue of RPM Weekly that Nash had been recording her album at Mushroom Studios in Vancouver with Rolf Hennemann as the engineer. She had just completed the task. The musicians that played on the album included Peter Clarke, Geoff Eyre, Dave Pickell and Harris Van Berkel. The album Letting Go, which was self-funded was first released on her own Nash Records in 1981. The following year it was released on Sefel SEF 1011 and Avalon AVE 1011.

Nash released the single "Beginners Luck" which was released on the Sefel label in 1982.

She later moved to Vancouver. Initially a member of the short-lived dance pop band Touché, she later released a second album and several singles as a solo artist. She participated in the 1986 charity single "Actions Speak Louder Than Words", performed as a backing vocalist for Bon Jovi, Loverboy, Long John Baldry, Dr. Hook & the Medicine Show, Big Walter Horton and Cher, and recorded the Expo 86 theme song "Something's Happening Here". She won a West Coast Music Award in 1987 for Best Female Vocalist.

She was a supporter of native rights, becoming a friend and musical collaborator of George's children in this era. Her relationship with the George family was strained in the early 1990s when she changed her name to Sazacha Red Sky, and began to state in promotional materials that she was George's adopted daughter.

== Controversy ==
George's son Leonard disputed the claim of adoption, noting that he had never met Nash until long after his father's death, and insisted that she did not have the right to record "The Prayer Song". Under conventional copyright law, as long as the song is properly credited and the appropriate royalties are paid a singer does not need permission to record a cover version of another musician's song — however, "The Prayer Song" is considered a sacred song to the Tsleil-Waututh First Nation, and according to Leonard George it could not be performed or recorded by a musician who is not a member of the First Nation unless it was explicitly given to that musician as a gift by Dan George or his surviving heirs. Nash had participated as a guest musician in public performances of the song by the George family, but according to Leonard George she had not been given their approval to record her own version without their participation.

Nash, for her part, claimed that Dan George had personally granted her permission to record "The Prayer Song" by appearing to her in a dream, in which he adopted her as his daughter on the basis that she had been his daughter in a previous incarnation. She also stated that Leonard George had originally given her his blessing to record the song, and withdrew his approval only after her album had already been released. She disputed George's claim that she had appropriated the song for financial gain, noting that only 1,000 copies of the album had been pressed of which she had no expectation of selling more than a few hundred. Further, the song was subsequently revealed to already have been registered in the public domain by SOCAN long before the release of Nash's recording.

Leonard George sought a legal injunction to prevent the award from being presented at the Juno Awards ceremony, and the final compromise revising her nomination to reflect the album instead of the song was announced on the morning of the ceremony.

Unlike Nash's dispute with the George family, Minnie Croft, the Haida elder whom Nash had named in the same promotional materials as her adoptive mother, confirmed to the media that she did consider Nash to be her adopted daughter.

The fact that Nash was of European heritage and had only an adoptive claim to First Nations culture did not affect her eligibility to be nominated, as the award is presented based on First Nations character in the music rather than the heritage of the musician.

== Later career ==
She has recorded three further albums, composed music for the documentary film Girl Gone Bad, and founded a wildlife sanctuary in British Columbia.

In 2013, she wrote and recorded "Comin' Home", a song for the centennial of her hometown of North Battleford. She reunited with her onetime Hot Cottage bandmate Cam MacInnes to record the album Long Live the Blues, released in 2014.

In 2015, Nash was the first woman to be inducted into the Edmonton Blues Hall of Fame.

== Discography ==
- Natural Born (1978)
- Touché (1979, with Touché)
- Letting Go (1982)
- Red Sky Rising (1992, as Sazacha Red Sky)
- Sing It to the Wind (as Sazacha Red Sky)
- Love Is All That Matters (2004)
- 4:11 Special (2010)
- Long Live the Blues (2014, as Nash-MacInnes)
