= Think of Me (album) =

Studio album by Mary Lu Zahalan
- Released: 1982
- Labels: Sefel Records SEF 1010; Avalon Records AVE 1010
- Producer: Randy Kumano

Mary Lu Zahalan chronology
Think of Me (1982)	Zahalan (1990)

Think of Me is a 1982 debut album by Canadian singer Mary Lu Zahalan. The album contains a number of charting singles.

== Background ==
Think of Me was the debut album for Mary Lu Zahalan and was produced by Randy Kumano. It contains her debut single "Try a Little Love Sometime" which was released on the Heart label. According to RPM Weekly in the magazine's 3 July issue, a French version of the album and single "Turn of the Wheel" were planned for the Quebec market. A distribution deal for the United States and Europe was in the pipeline.

Most of the material was written by Randy Kumano and Stuart Peterson. The album was aimed at the rock audience..

One of the backing singers on the album was Zahalan's friend Shirley Eikhard.

It was reported in the 25 December 1982 issue of RPM Weekly that the second single from the album had been released on Avalon Records. The credited producers were Randy Kumano and Jody Colero.

For the album, she received a Juno Award nomination in the Most Promising Female Vocalist category at the Juno Awards of 1983.

== Reception ==
The album was previewed on Radio CKAN's program "Canadian Made" (second edition) where she was a guest. As reported in the 7 August 1982 issue of RPM Weekly, this was the first time on Canadian radio, tracks from her album were played in Canada. The host of the program was Dean Burton. According to CKAN, the material from her album drew a favorable response from listeners.

It was reported in the 4 September issue of RPM Weekly that Zahalan was present for the opening of the new Toronto store for Records on Wheels and autographing copies of her album.

In a 2014 review of the song "Turn of the Wheel", Carlos Ramirez of No Echo wrote that Think of Me was definitely a product of its era with Zahalan laying pop-kissed vocals over tracks that ranged from AOR to soft ballads and horn-driven rock to pop. He wasn't surprised at success that it had on Canadian radio when first released. It was the song "Turn of the Wheel" that really impressed him.

== Singles ==
- Working with producer Randy Kumano, Zahalan recorded "Try A Little Love Sometime". Backed with "Take Me Through the Twilight", it was released on Heart HRT-8110 in 1981.
- "Turn of the Wheel" backed with "Think of Me" was produced by Randy Kumano. It was released on both Sefel Records 45-015 and Avalon AVN 100 in 1982. "Turn of the Wheel" debuted at No. 28 on the RPM Contemporary Adult chart for the week of 21 August. As reported in the 4 September issue of RPM Weekly, Zahalan was gaining ground on the RPM Contemporary Adult survey with her Sefel single release, "Turn of the Wheel". According to the 8 October article by The Hamilton Spectator, "Turn of the Wheel" had A&M play across Canada, was breaking into the Top 40 in Toronto, the Top 20 in Hamilton and the Top 10 in Moose Jaw.
- "If I Had One Wish" was produced by Randy Kumano and Jody Colero. Backed with "Caught In This Love", it was released on Avalon AVN 104 in 1982. It debuted at No. 29 on the RPM Contemporary Adult chart for the week of 13 November 1982.

== Track listing ==
=== A ===
- "Turn of the Wheel" – 3:19
- "Caught in This Love" – 4:00
- "Touch of a Lover" – 4:20
- "Try a Little Love Sometime" – 3:31
- "Would You Believe Me?" – 4:21

=== B ===
- "Think of Me" – 3:30
- "Daytime Nightime" – 3:00
- "Take Me Through the Twilight" – 3:28
- "If I Had One Wish – 3:00
- "Breaking Away" – 3:10
