= Brian Plummer (singer) =

- Born: 1954; Tisdale, Saskatchewan, Canada
- Died: 30 April 2008 (aged 53–54)
- Genre: Rock
- Occupation: Musician
- Instruments: Guitar, vocals
- Labels: 7 Records, Change Records, Change Records Inc., Sefel Records, Duke Street Records, AB CD Company, Head Shop Recordings
- Member of: Trina, Brian Plummer & The Reporters, Brian Plummer & Tax, Brian Plummer and the Suspects

Brian Plummer was a Canadian rock singer, guitarist and bandleader who had played in bands since his teens and later in the 1980s released singles and albums. Labels his albums were released on included the Change Records, Sefel Records and Duke Street Records labels.

== Background ==
Brian Plummer was born in Tisdale, Saskatchewan in 1954. By the time his family had moved to North Battleford and he was attending high school, he had already learnt guitar. By the age of seventeen he was playing in a band.

Plummer would attract controversy with the release of his album No Questions due to one song referencing the infamous Yorkshire Ripper. Four of his albums met with critical acclaim.

== Career ==
At the age of twenty, Plummer was living in Ottawa and playing with local group called Trina. The members were himself, Tom Cunningham and Greg Delaronde. The band would work the road on the Praries and in the Pacific Northwest area from 1970 to 1975. In 1974 Gerry Mosby joined the band. At that time the line up appeared to be Brian Plummer (guitar, vocals), Malcolm Buchanan (keyboards), Greg Delaronde (lead vocals), and Tom Cunningham (drums). They were a progressive band playing originals and covers. The band ran out of money and their last appearance was at the Gasworks on 15 March 1975. It was now the mid 1970s and Plummer had been in a band that he thought would go places. After the band broke up and Plummer took a hiatus from music for five years. For three of the five years, he was working at the Canadian Broadcasting Corporation as a technician.

=== Change Records period ===
Plummer and Al Higbee who was a CBC technician made a tape which ended up being accepted by Change Records. At some stage Plummer recorded a demo and had signed with Change Records. He had found them to be the most engaging for a contract of more than one record album. Working with guitarist Stacey Heydon who was also a producer, drummer Glenn Ens and some studio musicians, he recorded the No Questions album at Studio West in Saskatoon. The album was produced by John Stewart. One song from the album, "Jacky Boy" was about a serial killer, The Ripper. Plummer heard the "chilling phone calls" that he made to taunt the police.. The song was banned on British radio which gave Plummer great notoriety. The debut album No Questions was reviewed in the 29 March 1980 issue of RPM Weekly. The review was positive with the reviewer writing that it was "a hard driving rock album with a live band sound". The strong lyrics and the unusual, city-conscious themes were also noted. The single from the album was "Money Talks". It would get strong airplay. The album was also on the CanCon Albums Medium Rotation list that week. The single "Money Talks" was on the CanCon Singles Playlisted list at CJBK-129 Radio London for the week of 10 May. The album was also on the CanCon Albums Medium Rotation list at both Q107 in Toronto and Chez 106 FM in Ottawa. His album was still on the CanCon Medium rotation list, and for the week of 29 June at Q107 in Toronto and the single "Money Talks" was on the CanCon Singles Playlisted list at CJME Music Radio. It was still on the CJME list for the week of 12 July.

Plummer went on tour and he took with him drummer Glenn Ens who played on his album and guitarist Dave Cooper and bassist Dave Bowes who had been in his band, Brian Plummer & The Reporters.

As reported in the 5 July 1980 issue of RPM Weekly, the group Brian Plummer & Tax were touring the west of Canada and were set to record a second album in August of that year.

On Friday 11 July 1980, 7Ppm, Plummer & the Taxes, Goddo, Teaze and Les Pucks were appearing at the Saskatoon Pioneer Grandstand show.

Midway through Plummer's tour to promote the No Questions album and the single, Change Records went bankrupt.

=== Sefel Records period ===
Sefel Records was a record label that was known for releasing classical recordings. However a new division had been created for rock and pop artists. As reported in the 10 October 1981 issue of RPM Weekly. The label's move to including the new genres resulted in I'm as Guilty as You from Plummer, Cravings from Daniel Lavoie, Needless Freaking from Dwayne Ford and Lessons of Love from Guidonna Lee. The single from Plummer's album was "I'm As Guilty as You". The song was allegedly based on the kidnapping Toronto millionaire Fred Johnson. Backed with "Paper Star" the song was released on Sefel 45-009. According to an article in the 8 October issue of The Leader-Post, Plummer based it on the story of Lisa Johnson, wife of the Toronto car dealer Johnson. The article also said that this wasn't the first time that he had been inspired by the front pages of a daily newspaper.

=== Duke Street Records period ===
Plummer part of the Duke Street Records roster which also included Hugh Marsh, singer/songwriter, pianist Hagood Hardy, and singer Valdy.

Plummer released his Without a Mark on Duke Street DSR-31001-P. Much of the material were co-compositions by Plummer and Al Higbee. It was reviewed in the 24 March 1984 issue of RPM Weekly. It was positive with the reviewer writing that Plummer displayed his unique vocal talents in interpreting what was described as his own brand of contemporary rock. At the time his group, the Suspects were Bruce Fowler on keyboards, Jack Hazenbroek on drums, Phil Rohr on bass and himself on guitars. And as shown in the same issue, his album was getting regular rotation at CFNY-FM in Toronto..

His group Brian Pummer and the Suspects released their self-titled album on Duke Street Records DSR-31012-P in 1985. It was the RPM Weekly album pick for the week of 20 July 1985. It also had a positive review elsewhere in the issue. The group kicked off their promotional tour on 29 March. The single "Stop Running" which the group recorded was supported with a video. For the week of 27 July, the single was new on the playlist of CKGM in Montreal.

On Saturday 3 August Plummer, along with Babyface and Rocki Rolletti were appearing at the Grand Beach Jam.

On Wednesday 7 August 1985, Plummer and his band played at Razors. His performance was reviewed by Monica Zurowski for the Leader Post. The strongest performance was "Stop Running" which was the first single from his fourth album. Another song from the album was "Heart Full of Soul" which featured smooth vocal harmonies and what was described as a well-executed guitar solo. There were a small crowd of about forty people and the song got some of them dancing. he played another song "It's Not Easy" which got the people's feet tapping. However, due to technical problems, he stopped midway through a song, about 45 minutes into his first set.

For the week of 30 August, the Brian Plummer & The Suspects song "Stop Running" was at No. 20 on the playlist at CHOM in Montreal. And as shown in the 31 August issue of RPM Weekly, the song was a new addition to the playlist of C100 FM in Halifax. For the week of 8 November it was at No. 27. The song was included on the Wea No. 38 compilation video.

Brian Plummer and the Suspects were booked to appear at the Holiday on 3 December 1985.

According to an article in the 19 March 1987 issue of The Phoenix, Plummer thought that he was still with Duke Street Records even though he hadn't released any material in two years. His time was then spent preparing for a show that he was to headline at the Broadway Theater in a few days on Sunday. The show which was to stick to original material was to feature Paul Tobin as well as Active Joy. Plummer was to be backed by a five-piece band that was made up of William Butler on guitar, Glen Enns on drums, Dog Scarrow on guitar, Dean Kaplan on keyboards and Terry Collison on bass.

=== Further activities ===
Brian Plummer and the Suspects were appearing at the Dinwoodie Lounge on 27 March 1986.

In 1999, Plummer's album Plums was released on ABCD Company ABCD-32848-1.

In 2007 he released his Perfect World album on the Headshot label..

== Death ==
Plummer died of cancer on 30 April 2008.

== Discography ==
=== Albums ===
- Brian Plummer - No Questions - Change Records CLP-8010 - 1980
- Brian Plummer - I'm as Guilty as You - Sefel Records SEF-1002 - 1981
- Brian Plummer - No Questions - Sefel Records SEF-1005 - 1981 (remixed version of No Questions)
- Brian Plummer - Without A Mark - Duke Street Records DSR-31002 - 1984
- Brian Plummer & the Suspects - Brian Plummer and The Suspects Duke Street Records DSR-31012 - 1985
- Brian Plummer - Plums - ABCD Company ABCD-32848-1 - 1999
- Brian Plummer - Perfect World - Head Shop Recordings - 2007 (no catalogue no.)
