= Stone Cold Dead =

1979 Canadian film directed by George Mendeluk

- Film poster
- Directed by: George Mendeluk
- Written by: George Mendeluk
- Based on: The Sin Sniper by Hugh Garner
- Produced by: George Mendeluk; John Ryan
- Starring: Richard Crenna; Paul Williams
- Cinematography: Dennis Miller
- Edited by: Martin Pepler
- Music by: Paul Zaza; Guidonna Lee; Alexis Radlin
- Distributed by: Dimension Pictures
- Release date: 1979
- Running time: 97 minutes
- Country: Canada
- Language: English

Stone Cold Dead is a 1979 Canadian film directed by George Mendeluk and starring Richard Crenna and Paul Williams.

== Plot ==
A Toronto detective searches for a serial killer who shoots prostitutes. The detective is also determined to arrest the pushy pimps, and a few undercover cops get killed as they try to infiltrate the hooker trade.

== Cast ==
- Richard Crenna as Sergeant Boyd
- Paul Williams as Julius Kurtz
- Linda Sorenson as Monica Page
- Belinda Montgomery as Sandy MacAuley (credited as Belinda J. Montgomery)
- Chuck Shamata as Sergeant Tony Colabre (credited as Charles Shamata)
- Alberta Watson as Olivia Page
- Monique Mercure as Dr. Bouvier
- George Chuvalo as Frank
- Andrée Cousineau as Bernice Carnival
- Jennifer Dale as Claudia Grissom
- Frank Moore as Teddy Mann
- George Touliatos as Inspector Webb
- Dennis Strong as Danny De Lion
- Michael Ironside as Murdered Police Detective
- Lesleh Donaldson as Girl In Police Station
- Lynette Louise as Prostitute (uncredited)
- Linnea Quigley as First Victim (uncredited)

== Production ==
Crenna said he was drawn to the film partly because his character survives the events of the plot, something that few of his characters had done recently. Mendeluk used both actresses and real-life Toronto prostitutes during filming. Shooting took place during November and December 1978 in Toronto, and production ended in February 1979. It was based on the novel The Sin Sniper by Hugh Garner.

== Reception ==
TV Guide rated it 1/5 stars and called it a "typical crime thriller".

Crenna later said that he thought the content was not Canadian-specific enough.
