= You Never Saw Me Crying =

Song by Guidonna Lee

from the album Lessons of Love
- A-side: "You Never Saw Me Crying"
- B-side: "Do You Dream"
- Released: 1980
- Length: 2:46
- Label: Sefel Records 45-001
- Composer: Guidonna Lee
- Producer: Ken Frissen

Guidonna Lee singles chronology
"You Never Saw Me Crying" (1980)	"Second Hand Emotion" (1980)

"You Never Saw Me Crying" is a 1980 single composed and recorded by Guidonna Lee. It registered on two Canadian charts that year.

== Background ==
Guidonna Lee wrote the song "You Never Saw Me Crying". Working with music producer Ken Friesen, she recorded the song as well as another composition of hers, "Do You Dream". With "You Never Saw Me Crying" as the A side, both songs were released on Sefel Records 45–001 in 1980. The song appeared in the film The Kidnapping of the President which starred William Shatner, Hal Holbrook, Van Johnson and Ava Gardner.

The song was a hit in Canada, making both the RPM Weekly RPM Adult Oriented Playlist and the RPM Country 75 Singles charts.

The song was also the first single release for Sefel Records and its first successful pop release.

== Charts ==
=== RPM Adult Oriented Playlist ===
"You Never Saw Me Crying" debuted at No. 50 on the RPM Adult Oriented Playlist chart for the week of 4 October 1980. By 22 November, the single had moved up from No. 29 to No. 25.

=== RPM Country 75 Singles ===
For the week of 4 October, "You Never Saw Me Crying "debuted at No 75 on the RPM Country 75 Singles chart. For the week of 22 November, the record peaked at No. 34. It held that position until 6 December. By that time, the chart had been renamed as RPM Country 50 Singles.
