= CJMQ-FM =

Radio station in Sherbrooke, Quebec

Coordinates: 45°23′48″N 71°49′52″W

- Sherbrooke, Quebec; Canada
- Frequency: 88.9 MHz

Programming
- Language: English
- Format: community radio

Ownership
- Owner: Radio Bishop's Inc.

History
- First air date: 1995

Technical information
- Class: A
- ERP: 2 kW

Links
- Website: www.cjmq.fm

CJMQ-FM is a Canadian radio station. Based in Sherbrooke, Quebec, where it has studios in both downtown Sherbrooke and the borough of Lennoxville, the station broadcasts a community radio format targeted to Anglo-Quebecers in Sherbrooke and the Eastern Townships.

The station broadcasts at a frequency of 88.9 FM in Sherbrooke, on the cable FM services of Vidéotron (103.9 FM) and Cogeco (104.7 FM), and on the Internet.

Since the demise of CKTS in 1992, CJMQ is the only locally produced English-language broadcaster in the Eastern Townships.

== History ==
CJMQ originated in the 1940s as the Radio Club of Bishop's University, a campus radio station at Bishop's University which broadcast by closed circuit and carrier current. In the 1940s it had a studio in the basement of Norton Hall. With the construction of Bishop Mountain House (or the Student Union Building) the station acquired space in the basement and constructed their first studio.

In the 1970s, as Radio Bishop's, the service broadcast in the late evenings over CKTS, the local English radio station in Sherbrooke. This continued to 1978 when CKTS had sufficient resources to cover their broadcasting day.

In the early 1980s, the station radically expanded, acquiring a large complement of studio equipment from the Canadian Broadcasting Corporation, including the sound console from Les Beaux Dimanches, and a complete studio from CJFM in Montreal. At this time Radio Bishop's changed its name to RCBU (Radio Champlain Bishop's University) to recognise the support from Champlain Regional College. In 1987, the station officially incorporated as CJMQ Radio Bishop's Inc.

In 1995, CJMQ was granted its first broadcast license by the Canadian Radio-television and Telecommunications Commission, and began broadcasting at an effective radiated power of 25 watts on the FM band to a broadcast audience within the town of Lennoxville. It was licensed by the CRTC as a low power not-for-profit campus-community station, which meant it had to provide an alternative source of news, information, and entertainment programming. Transmitting power and antenna location meant that signal reception was not optimum: parts of Bishop's University campus itself and one side of the main street in downtown Lennoxville received a static filled signal throughout the majority of the broadcast day. In 1998, CJMQ increased its effective radiated power to 500 watts.

In 2004, the CRTC reclassified the station's license from campus radio to community radio. Following the shutdown of CKTS in 2006, CJMQ's license was upgraded from Type B to Type A, a special status which confers a more flexible set of regulatory requirements on community radio stations in markets which are not served by any commercial radio stations operating in the same language.

In 2007, the station was granted another power increase, from 500 to 1,670 watts.
