= Bob Van Dyke =

- Also known as: Van Dyke
- Born: Saskatoon, Saskatchewan, Canada
- Years active: 1970s - ?
- Labels: Change Records, BBC Radioplay Music

Bob Van Dyke aka Van Dyke is a Canadian country singer. He had a number of charting singles during the later part of the 1970s and into the early 1980s.

== Background ==
Bob Van Dyke was born in Saskatchewan, Canada. He was raised in a small community outside Saskatoon. He had his debut album Deal Me In released in 1977. It produced a number of chart hits.

== Career ==
Van Dyke recorded his album Deal Me In which was released on Change CLP 8001 in 1977. It was well-received with Johnny Murphy commenting in the 10 December issue of RPM Weekly that Van Dyke had the ability to write and sing refreshing, exciting songs. The following week it was reviewed in the magazine with the reviewer mentioning the different genres within and that Van Dyke's move into country was smooth and well thought out.

It was reported in the 18 March 1978 issue of RPM Weekly that current single from the album Deal Me In was "They Call Her Easy", a Harry Chapin composition. It was backed with Van Dyke's own country genre composition, "Ridin' High". "They Call Her Easy" had gained major market airplay at a range of stations. "Ridin' High" had been added to the playlists of various AM and FM country stations. It debuted at No. 49 on the RPM Adult Oriented Playlist for the week of 18 March. It was one of the three Rock-Oriented Action Singles for the week of 29 April. It also debuted at No. 100 on the RPM 100 Top Singles chart that week.

In 1978, Van Dyke recorded and released his Another… album on Change CLP 8004. By early 1979, RPM Weekly had confirmed that Van Dyke's second album was released.

Van Dyke's version of the Dave Mason composition "Every Woman" backed with his composition "Moonshine Molly" were released on Change CH 45011 in December 1978. The single debuted at No. 71 on the Country 75 Singles chart for the week of 30 December.

The A side of his single, "A Nice Nite for Falling in Love" was credited to Van Dyke featuring Staphanie Taylor. Backed with "Sun Sets in California", it was released on Change CH-45016 in April 1979.

It was reported in the July-August 1979 issue of The Music Scene that Van Dyke and his band were to perform two songs at the Intervisons World Song Festival in Warsaw, Poland that summer. One was to be an original composition and the other was from a Polish composer.

Van Dyke released the single "Texas" bw "I Wanna Hold You" on Change CH-45023 in 1979. It debuted at No. 72 on the RPM Country 75 Singles chart for the week of 10 November.

Van Dyke's album Only Two Lives to Live was released on Change CLP 8013 in 1980.
