= Patti Jannetta =

Canadian pop and rock singer

- Also known as: Jannetta
- Origin: Canada
- Occupation: Singer
- Years active: 1980s, 1990s
- Labels: Janta, Trilogy Records International

Patti Jannetta is a Canadian pop and rock singer, who was most prominent in the 1980s and early 1990s.

== Background ==
She was first discovered while going to school in Toronto after which she became a teen actress and landed a role in the Canadian production of Jesus Christ Superstar. She was later active with the band Mixed Reaction.

Her father is Louis Jannetta, the longtime maitre d' of Toronto's Imperial Room,

== Work ==
She released her first album, Patti Jannetta, in 1981. The album's first single "You've Got No One" charted on the Adult Contemporary charts in RPM, peaking at #7 in the week of April 9, 1983, the second single "I'm Ready for Your Love" peaked at #15 in the week of August 6, and "Don't Change" peaked at #13 in the week of April 7, 1984.

She represented Canada at the Festival Sopot in Poland in 1984, and was presented the "Musician's Favorite" award. In 1986, she hosted her own Christmas special on CFTO-TV.

Her second album, Breathless, was released in 1988, and garnered radio airplay for the singles "Party Girl" and "Name of the Game". She promoted the album with a cross-Canada concert tour, including a performance in Ottawa as part of the 76th Grey Cup festivities. She was a Juno Award nominee for Most Promising Female Vocalist at the Juno Awards of 1989.

She followed up in 1991 with her third and final album, Mark on My Heart. The album's main singles were "I Know You'll Wait" and the title track; "I Know You'll Wait" reached #28 on RPM's adult contemporary charts the week of July 6, 1991, while "Mark on My Heart" reached #14 on the adult contemporary charts the week of August 29, 1992, and #64 on the general contemporary hit radio chart in the week of July 25. The album also included the song "Even Though You're Gone", a tribute to a friend who had died of AIDS. Her tour to support the album was one of the first concert tours ever to be officially sponsored by a condom company, she included a safer sex education component in her live show, and a portion of the album's sales were donated to AIDS charities.

She has not released any further albums since Mark on My Heart, instead becoming involved in arts and charity administration, although she has continued to perform at benefit concerts in Toronto and Mississauga, including the 1999 Sick Kids Hospital Mistletoe Ball and Mississauga mayor Hazel McCallion's 90th birthday party in 2011. She has also performed and toured as a backing vocalist for Ronnie Hawkins.

In 2013, Jannetta was presented with the Freedom for the Song award, in honour of her role in a 1987 protest by musicians against Canadian royalty payment rates. She was both the youngest and the only female musician active in the campaign.

In August 2020, Jannetta received a star on the Mississauga Music Walk of Fame, which has previously honoured figures such as Jeff Healey, Alessia Cara, Ronnie Hawkins, Tommy Hunter, and Liberty Silver. Jannetta was the 29th inductee.
