= I Could Give You the World =

Song by Jim Mancel
- A-side: "I Could Give You the World"
- B-side: "Sidewalk Dreamer"
- Released: 1970
- Label: Polydor 2065 026
- Composer(s): M. Butler, B. Bilyk
- Producer(s): Ben Kaye

Jim Mancel singles chronology
"I Could Give You the World" (1970)	"Let the Phone Ring" (1975)

"I Could Give You the World" was a chart hit for Jim Mancel in 1970. It won an award in Greece at the 3rd Olympiad of Song.

== Background ==
The single was released in 1970. In first place was "Aido" by Ljupka Dimitrovska from Yugoslavia. According to Cash Box Mancel came second with his entry, and in third place was Eva Correia José Maria from Brazil with "Teletema". It became an award winner in Greece at the 3rd Olympiad of Song. However, newspaper Photo Journal has Mancel winning third prize. He did though win a prize of $300 and received a medal of honor.

== Charts ==
The record made its debut in the Top 50 MAPL Canadian Chart at #49 on September 19. It would get to #26 on the Top 30 MAPL Canadian Chart on October 31. On that week, the chart had been changed from Top 50 MAPL to Top 30 MAPL.

"I Could Give You the World" spent a total of seven weeks in the MAPL chart.

=== Other lists ===
On the week of November, 7 due to the MAPL chart changing to the Top 20 MAPL chart. The song was now in the "Recommended singles meeting CRTC requirements for AM radio" section.

On the 14th of November it was in the "Recommended selections that have met RPM's good music programming standards" section, just outside the Top 20 MAPL GMP Playlist chart.
