= Bearfoot (Canadian band) =

Canadian rock band, founded 1969

- Also known as: Atkinson, Danko and Ford; Atkinson, Danko and Ford (with Brockie and Hilton); Dwayne Ford and Bearfoot
- Origin: Toronto, Ontario, Canada
- Genres: Rock, country rock
- Years active: 1969–1970s, 1985–?
- Label: Columbia
- Past members: Jim Atkinson; Terry Danko; Dwayne Ford; Hugh Brockie; Brian Hilton; Mal Turner; Malcolm Tomlinson; Chris Vickery; Marty Cordrey; Penti 'Whitey' Glan; Jerry Baird

Bearfoot was a Juno Award-nominated Canadian rock band, founded by Jim Atkinson, Terry Danko, Dwayne Ford, Hugh Brockie and Brian Hilton. Initially going by "Atkinson, Danko and Ford", they changed their name out of practicality and because they didn't want to sound as though they were a law-firm. They released three albums and five singles through Columbia Records.

== Biography ==
The founding members came together as part of Ronnie Hawkins' Rock and Roll Revival and Travelling Medicine Show, first meeting at the Graham Bell Hotel in Brantford, Ontario. Hawkins' group played the upstairs lounge that day while Danko and Atkinson's group, Tin Pan Alley, played downstairs. Hawkins hired the two as part of his group, which Ford, Brockie and Hilton were already part of.

Bearfoot eventually formed in 1969 and left Hawkins to sign with Columbia. They released three albums and five singles through the label. Their first, 1972 album was released under the name "Atkinson, Danko and Ford (with Brockie and Hilton)". They were nominated for the 1974 Juno Award for Most Promising Group of the Year, which Bachman-Turner Overdrive would win. Danko and Atkinson left in 1973 to pursue work as musicians in California. The group continued without them, releasing their final album as "Dwayne Ford and Bearfoot" in 1975. Danko and Atkinson returned to Canada in 1985 and reformed the band for a time with Jerry Baird. The group is now presumably defunct.

== Discography ==
=== Albums ===
Year	Title	Label	Notes
1972	Atkinson, Danko and Ford (with Brockie and Hilton)	Columbia	*as "Atkinson, Danko and Ford (with Brockie and Hilton)"
1973	Bearfoot	Columbia	*re-issue of first album, as "Bearfoot"
1973	Friends with Bearfoot	Columbia	
1975	Passing Time	Columbia	*as "Dwayne Ford and Bearfoot"

=== Singles ===
Year	Title	Label	Notes
1972	Right On/Holy, Holy, Holy	Columbia	
1972	Right On/Mark Twain	Columbia	*alternate B-side *issued in the USA
1973	Only A Soldier/Life Goes Too Fast	Columbia	
1973	Molly/St. Augustine	Columbia	
1974	Passing Time/She Comes to Me	Columbia	
1975	Cable to Carol	Columbia	

=== Compilation inclusions ===
Year	Song	Album	Label	Notes
1976	"Passing Time"	Canada's Finest	K-Tel	
