= The Kidnapping of the President =

1980 film by George Mendeluk

- Theatrical film poster
- Directed by: George Mendeluk
- Screenplay by: Richard Murphy
- Based on: The Kidnapping of the President; 1974 novel by Charles Templeton
- Produced by: George Mendeluk; John Ryan
- Starring: William Shatner; Hal Holbrook; Van Johnson; Ava Gardner; Miguel Fernandes; Cindy Girling; Michael J. Reynolds; Elizabeth Shepherd; Gary Reineke; Maury Chaykin
- Cinematography: Mike Molloy
- Edited by: Michael MacLaverty
- Music by: Nash the Slash; Paul Zaza
- Distributed by: Crown International Pictures
- Release dates: 15 August 1980 (U.S.); 19 September 1980 (Canada)
- Running time: 114 minutes
- Countries: Canada; United States
- Language: English

The Kidnapping of the President is a 1980 Canadian-American political thriller film starring William Shatner, Hal Holbrook, Van Johnson and Ava Gardner.

== Background ==
It was produced and directed by George Mendeluk and co-produced by John Ryan from a screenplay by Richard Murphy, based on Charles Templeton's 1974 novel of the same name. The original music is by Nash the Slash and Paul Zaza and the cinematography by Mike Molloy. The song "You Never Saw Me Crying" by Guidonna Lee appears in the film. The film was made by Presidential Films and Sefel Films and distributed by Crown International Pictures.

== Plot ==
During a state visit to Canada, President Adam Scott is warned by Secret Service agent Jerry O'Connor about a potential threat to his life. Scott ignores O'Connor's warning and is consequently abducted (while walking through Nathan Phillips Square in Toronto) by South American terrorist Roberto Assanti and his female accomplice. They demand $100 million in diamonds along with two airplanes as ransom for the president's safe return.

While Scott is being held captive in an armored truck booby-trap with high explosives timed to detonate at midnight, O'Connor must find a way into the truck to rescue him before that happens, while also contending with a turf war between various U.S. federal law enforcement agencies and the political ambitions of the U.S. vice president, Ethan Richards.

Agent O'Connor eventually gets one of Assanti's terrorist group members to turn on Assanti, which caused Assanti's sister to die. O'Connor learns Assanti's plan for the president and develops a plan to save the President by going through the engine and firewall with a cutting torch.

== Cast ==
- William Shatner as Secret Service Agent Jerry O'Connor
- Hal Holbrook as President Adam Scott
- Van Johnson as Vice President Ethan Richards
- Ava Gardner as Second Lady Beth Richards
- Miguel Fernandes as Roberto Assanti
- Cindy Girling as Linda Steiner
- Elizabeth Shepherd as First Lady Joan Scott
- Michael J. Reynolds as MacKenzie
- Gary Reineke as Deitrich
- Maury Chaykin as Harvey Cannon
- Murray Westgate as Archie Standler
- Ken Anderson as Willis
- Sully Boyar as Director of the FBI
- Aubert Pallascio as the Canadian Prime Minister (unnamed, but resembling the non-fictional prime minister at the time, Pierre Trudeau)
- Virginia Podesser as the Canadian Prime Minister's Wife

== Novel ==
The movie is based on Charles Templeton's bestselling 1974 novel of the same name. The primary difference between the two is the story's location. The book sets the kidnapping in New York City's Herald Square and the subsequent siege in nearby Times Square. In the movie, the kidnapping occurs in Templeton's home city, Toronto, with the mob, chase, and explosion scenes commencing in Nathan Phillips Square.

Although the novel and the film have their differences, senior feature writer at The Globe and Mail Stephen Godfrey found "the film is as easy to 'read' as the book apparently was. The inevitable cross-cutting, from fanatical terrorists to the presidential cavalcade, and later, from a nearly unflappable security man (William Shatner) in Toronto, is well handed."

== Critical reception ==
The film received lukewarm ratings overall. It received a lot of talk from the New York Post and the Newark Star Ledger as well as outstanding reviews from Bergen Records and other newspaper organizations.

Janet Maslin, from The New York Times, thought the plot was not fresh enough to be frightening and the characters were not brave enough to do anything new.

Chris Lowry, a writer for Film Reviews, found George Mendeluk's directing uninspiring and Richard Murphy's screenplay mediocre for an action movie. Lowry stated, "the film disorients and disturbs the audience at the outset" since the subject of kidnapping a president isn't a funny concept in general. He expected the editing to be better as well since the readers of the novel were aware that the setting is different in the film compared to the novel.

== Award nominations ==
The film received two nominations in the 1981 Genie Awards.

Best Achievement in Film Editing - Michael MacLaverty

Best Achievement in Overall Sound - Mike Hoogenboom, Douglas Ganton, and Nolan Roberts
