= Make My Life a Little Bit Brighter =

Single by Chester
- B-side: "But Maybe Next Time"
- Released: 1973
- Label: Celebration
- Songwriter: Michael Argue
- Producer: Bob Morten

Chester singles chronology
"Make My Life a Little Bit Brighter" (1973)	"Start a Dream" (1974)

"Make My Life a Little Bit Brighter" was a hit single for Canadian pop/rock group Chester in 1973.

== Background ==
"Make My Life a Little Bit Brighter" was released as a single backed with "But Maybe Next Time" on the Celebration label. It was written by Michael Argue. Both sides were produced by Bob Morten. This was the first of two singles before the original incarnation of Chester broke up. Chester was founded by Glen Morrow in late 1972. By the summer of '73 the group had been together for about seven months and their single was racing up the charts.

It was listed at No. 38 on the Top 100 Singles of 1973 list by RPM Weekly in the magazine's December 29 issue.

The record was released in the United States on Bell 379. One of the stations in the US that was spinning the record was WIXY in Cleveland.

== Musicians ==
- Glenn Morrow - keyboard, guitar and vocals
- Jim Mancel - lead vocals
- Mike Argue - lead guitar and vocals
- Glen “Wedge” Monroe - drums, piano, and guitar

== Chart performance ==
=== Canada ===
With the song getting played on Mike Goddin's show at CFCF Montreal, it had debuted in the RPM100 Singles chart for the week of July 28, 1973. It held the #10 spot for three weeks. By December 8, with the CHUM Chart coming close to a 30% Canadian content, the single was taking the lead at #3 on the CHUM chart. The single was still charting at #60, having held the position for two weeks. It was still charting on the RPM100 Singles chart at #77 on December 29. By January 12, it was off the RPM 100 Singles chart. But it was still on The Programmers Pop Music Playlist, dropping from the previous week's #55 spot to #73.

=== United States ===
Entering the Cash Box Looking Ahead chart on October 6, 1973, it had seven weeks run with one of those weeks (September 1) in the Cash Box Top 100 Singles chart. The last position was at #114.

It entered the Record World 100 - 150 singles chart at #114 on September 8, 1973. It peaked at #101 on October 6.
