= Cashbox =

Cashbox may refer to:

- Cash register
- Safe
- Cashbox (magazine), a music industry publication, in print from 1942 to 1996
