= Moe Koffman =

Canadian jazz musician (1928–2001)

Background information
- Born: Morris Koffman; 28 December 1928; Toronto, Ontario, Canada
- Died: 28 March 2001 (aged 72) Orangeville, Ontario, Canada
- Genres: Jazz
- Occupation: Musician
- Instruments: Saxophone; flute
- Labels: Anthem; GRT; Jubilee; Kama Sutra; United Artists

Morris "Moe" Koffman, OC (28 December 1928 – 28 March 2001) was a Canadian jazz saxophonist and flautist, as well as composer and arranger. During a career spanning from the 1950s into the 2000s, Koffman was one of Canada's most prolific musicians, working variously in clubs and sessions and releasing 30 albums. With his 1957 record Cool and Hot Sax on the New York-based Jubilee label, Koffman became one of the first Canadian jazz musicians to record a full-length album. Koffman was also a long-time member of Rob McConnell's Boss Brass.

His most famous pieces, "Curried Soul" and "Koff Drops", have been the theme music for the CBC Radio One show, As It Happens, since 1972.

== Early life and education ==
Koffman was born in Toronto to Jewish immigrants from Poland. His parents operated a variety store. At the age of nine he began his musical studies in his native city, studying violin. He studied with Gordon Delamont, and later attended the Toronto Conservatory of Music, now the Royal Conservatory of Music of Toronto, where he was a student of Samuel Dolin.

== Background ==
Koffman dropped out of school when he found work performing in dance bands. In 1950, he moved to the United States, where he played with big bands including those of Sonny Dunham and Jimmy Dorsey. In 1955, he returned to Toronto where he formed a quartet and later a quintet. He recorded Swinging Shepherd Blues in 1957 which helped establish his reputation as a flautist. "Swinging Shepherd Blues" was a hit in Canada, reaching #4, the United States, reaching #38 on the Billboard pop chart, and #23 on the UK Singles Chart.

Koffman was inspired by Rahsaan Roland Kirk to play multiple instruments at once; and had a modified set of straps to hold a tenor and an alto saxophone so that he could put forward incredible chords and improvise at the same time. One of the more famous session musicians in Toronto, he appeared in countless commercials, background music, and film and TV soundtracks. Most work on bass flute in Canadian soundtracks from 1950 to 1990 in Toronto sessions was done by Koffman on this rare instrument. Koffman was also an exponent of circular breathing techniques for his large volumes of sound, and joined fellow Canadian Maynard Ferguson and new age multi-instrumentalist musician Ron Allen in this talent.

During the 1970s, Koffman recorded several albums with arrangements of works by classical composers including Bach, Mozart and Vivaldi. The albums were released by GRT Canada and later by Universal. He also was a guest performer with a number of symphony orchestras across Canada.

He performed with Dizzy Gillespie and Peter Appleyard during the 1980s, as well as continuing to front the Moe Koffman Quintet. He often performed with Rob McConnell's Boss Brass. From 1956 to 1990, Koffman booked performers for George's Spaghetti House in Toronto, where he performed weekly. His compositions "Curried Soul" and "Koff Drops" have been used as the opening and closing themes respectively for the CBC radio show As It Happens since 1972.

He was appointed to the Order of Canada in 1993 and inducted into the Canadian Music Hall of Fame in 1997.

== Career ==
By May 1970, Koffman's album, Moe's Curried Soul was out on the Revolver label. It entered the RPM100 album chart at #100 on the week ending May 9. It peaked at #90 on the week ending June 13.

Koffman recorded the single "City Motions" with The Longo Brothers. It charted in the CanCon Top 10 Adult Contemporary chart for a number of weeks in 1984.

== Illness and death ==
Koffman was diagnosed with non-Hodgkin's lymphoma in 2000, and died of cancer in Orangeville, Ontario in 2001 at the age of 72.

== Legacy ==
In 2002, Moe Koffman was a MasterWorks honouree by the Audio-Visual Preservation Trust of Canada. Some of Koffman's music for Duke Street Records was unreleased at the time of his death. Music for the Night was released and re-issued in 2007, and Devil's Brew was re-issued in 2009.

== Discography (Selective) ==
Canadian singles
Act	Release	Catalogue	Year	Notes
Moe Koffman Quartette Moe Koffman Septette	"The Swingin' Shepherd Blues" / "Hambourg Bound"	Quality K1690	1957	
Moe Koffman Quartet	"Little Pixie" / "Koko-Mamey"	Jubilee 45-5324	1958	
Moe Koffman	"Keep Walkin' Little Flock" / "Wishbone"	Zirkon 1057	1961	
Moe Koffman	"Swingin' Shepherd Blues Twist"	United Artists UA 2100	1962	
Moe Koffman	"Jazz Merengue" / "Growing Up"	United Artists UA 2118	1962	
Moe Koffman	"Soul Brothers" / "I Want to Hold Your Hand"	Jubilee J-5485X	1964	
Moe Koffman	"Flootenanny" / "Coffee House"	Sparton 4-1243-R	1964	
Moe Koffman	"Bulldog Walk" / "Big Bad Irving"	Atco ATCO. 6382	1965	
Moe Koffman	"Night Love (Nacht Liebe)" / "Senor Acapulco"	Columbia C4-2727	1967	
The Longo Brothers Featuring Moe Koffman	"City Motions" / "If the Feeling's Not Right"	People City Music PCM 823	1984	

LPs:

- Cool and Hot Sax (1957) (Jubilee)
- The Shepherd Swings Again (1958) (Jubilee)
- Moe Koffman The Swinging Shepherd Plays for Teens (1962) (Ascot)
- Tales of Koffman (1962) (UA)
- The Moe Koffman Quartet (1963) (CTA)
- Moe Koffman (1967) (Universal)
- 1967 (1967) (Just A Memory)
- Moe Koffman Quartet (1967) (CBC/RCI)
- Moe Koffman Goes Electric (1967) (Jubilee)
- Turned On Moe Koffman (1968) (Jubilee)
- Moe's Curried Soul with Doug Riley & Lenny Breau (1969) (Revolver)
- Moe Koffman Plays Bach (1971) (GRT)
- The Four Seasons (1972) (GRT)
- Master Session (1974) (GRT)
- Solar Explorations (1974) (GRT)
- Swinging Shepherd (1975) (Universal)
- Live at George's (1975) (GRT)
- Jungle Man (1976) (GRT)
- Museum Pieces (1977) (Janus), a Juno Award for Best Jazz Album nominee
- Things Are Looking Up (1978) (GRT)
- Back to Bach (1979) (Anthem)
- Project (1980) (Universal)
- If You Don't Know Me By Now... (1982) (Elektra)
- Moe-Mentum (1986) (Universal)
- One Moe Time (1986) (Duke)
- Oop.Pop.A.Da featuring Dizzy Gillespie (1989) (Universal)
- Moe Koffman Quintet Plays (1990) (Duke Street Records)
- Music for the Night arranged by Doug Riley (1991) (Universal)
- Collection (1993) (Universal)
- Devil's Brew (1996) (Universal)

With the Ron Collier Orchestra featuring Duke Ellington

- North of the Border in Canada (Decca, 1967 [1969])

== See also ==
- Music of Canada
- Canadian Music Hall of Fame
