= Sefel Records =

- Parent company: Sefel Geophysical Corporation
- Founded: June 1980
- Founder: Joseph Sefel
- Genre: Classical, popular
- Country of origin: Canada

Sefel Records is a Canadian record label that released classical recordings. The label also released popular music recordings.

== Background ==
Sefel Records was founded in June 1980. It stemmed from the Sefel Geophysical Corporation. It was founded by Joseph Sefel, a Canadian businessman who was originally from Hungary. Sefel also had interests in oil and commercial real estate.

The music division was headed by Paul White who had been the A&R director for Capitol-EMI in Canada as well as a director with the Balmur Group.

The intention of the label was to fill a void as there was no major classical music record label in Canada.

In the early 1980s, the USA contact for the label was R.K. Herrington at 12 Maple Leaf Dr. Park Ridge, N.J. 07656.

Also in the early 1980s the label had created a pop / rock division. The first popular artists were, Brian Plummer, Daniel Lavoie, Dwayne Ford, and Guidonna Lee.

== History ==
In 1980, Sefel Records had lunched a takeover bid on the Almada Corporation.

Having taken over the Almada Corporation, Joseph Sefel noted that the move would greatly assist Sefel Records which was still in the fledgling stage. He said that they would be able to call on the skills of the national organization to promote and sell Sefel's records. Under the one umbrella would be Sefel Records, the Almada Corporation, and Distribution Almada One-Stop. By the beginning of the following year, the Almada branch of the operation was to be housed in new general offices and warehouses in Montreal. Sefel company was to remain based in Toronto. Frank Schweiger and Ken Mailer were to be based in Calgary. Schweiger was appointed to the position of executive vice president for all Sefel operations including Sefel Geophysical, Sefel Properties and Entertainment Division. Ken Mailer was to take the position of vice president of entertainment. In Toronto, Paul White who had been in the positions vice president and general manager of Sefel Records, had been appointed vice president and chief operations officer of Sefel Music Divisions, which included Sefel Records, Sefel Publising and the two Almada companies.

According to Paul White, the label was not just a classical record label as some people still thought. He also said that they would be moving to make more aggressive decisions in acquiring product for Sefel and Almada. He also pointed out that Sefel Records was now enjoying its first successful pop release with Guidonna Lee's single, "You Never Saw Me Crying". Lee was actually the first popular artist that had been signed to the label.

It was reported in the 15 June 1985 issue of Cash Box that Intercon Music Corp was to handle the U.S. national distribution for Sefel Records.

== Classical releases ==
As reported in the 26 July 1980 issue of RPM Weekly, Sefel Records was moving into Digital Sound. The label had recently signed entered into an exclusive worldwide contract with Arpad Joo, music director & conductor of the Calgary Philharmonic Orchestra. Sefel Group chairman Joseph Sefel was interested in the digital sound system and had made some exploratory moves in that direction. Their first project would be with maestro Joo conducting the London Symphony Orchestra. He was scheduled to record four albums of popular classical works in August which would take place at the Walthamstow Hall in London, England.

The box set of recordings by the Budapest Philharmonic and Symphony Orchestras, Barktok: The Major Orchestral Works, conducted by Arpad Joó was positively reviewed in the 19 December 1981 issue of Cash Box.

The Live at Carnegie Hall album by The New York Pops and Skitch Henderson was released on Sefel SEFD 5026. It was reviewed in the 17 March 1984 issue of Billboard. It was positive with the reviewer writing that Henderson was an ideal interpreter and the sound is warm and ingratiating.

== Pop and rock releases ==
Guidonna Lee was born Guidonna Lee Terzi in Calgary in 1947. She received her Bachelor of Music in Vocal Performance from the University of Calgary in 1970. It was announced by Sefel Records' vice-president Paul White in the 16 August 1980 issue of RPM Weekly that had been signed to the label. She was also the first pop artist that had been signed. She was currently recording her album at Eastern Sound with Ken Friesen handling the production duties. She released the single "You Never Saw Me Crying" which was produced by Ken Friesen and released on Sefel Records 45-001. It appeared in the film, The Kidnapping of the President that starred William Shatner, Hal Holbrook, Van Johnson & Ava Gardner. "You Never Saw Me Crying" made both the RPM Weekly RPM Adult Oriented Playlist and the RPM Country 75 Singles charts. She also had some success on the RPM Adult Oriented CanCon chart with "Second Hand Emotion" with the single peaking at No. 8. She died at age 76, after a 16-month battle with cancer on 27 July 2023.

As reported in the 29 August 1981 issue of Billboard, Sefel Records was reissuing an album that Brian Plummer had recorded for a defunct record label. Set for release in the fall, the album was to appear with new mixes, vocals and packaging.

By October 1981, Sefel Records was underway with popular releases as a result of the pop / rock division that was created following several new artists that had been signed up. Brian Plummer's album, I'm As Guilty as You had been released. Dwayne Ford's first solo album Needless Freaking had been released. Guidonna Lee's Lessons of Love had also been released. Daniel Lavoie's album Cravings was produced by himself, Ben Low and Mike Delaney. The song "Henry" was taken from the album for single release. From Brian Plummer's album, "I'm As Guilty as You" was released as a single. The song was allegedly based on the kidnapping Toronto millionaire Fred Johnson. Dwayne Ford, an artist who had recently been signed to Sefel Records had released the single, "Livin' and Losin' You". Guidonna Lee was to have the single " Jamie's Song" released. It was taken from her album Lessons of Love which was produced by Howard Steele. It was due to be shipped by the end of October. A children's album by Mark Dominico, George Szabo and Jim Aguanno, I'm Just a Kid was due for release.

Brian Plummer was from Tisdale in Saskatchewan. He had recorded five singles, including four for Change Records before coming to Sefel Records. He recorded "Lisa" / "The King of the Jungle" which was released on Sefel 45-006 and "I’m As Guilty as You" / "Paper Star" which was released on Sefel 45-009. His No Questions album that was released on Change Records in 1980 was remixed and released on Sefel SEF-1002 in 1981. He later recorded for Duke Street Records under his own name and with Brian Plummer and the Suspects.

Nicole Martin recorded "(Do You Remember) When the World Was Round". It was backed with "Downtown Quebec City" and released on Sefel Records P-1938-45 in 1981. The song appears on the 1981 soundtrack album, The Plouffe Family to the film The Plouffe Family.

Craig Ruhnke wrote, arranged and recorded "Baby Blue". Backed with his composition, "My Heart Belongs to You", it was released on Sefel 45-010 in May 1982.

A Girl Next Door aka The Girl Next Door was an act who had worked with producer Don Hamilton-Stevens and recorded the single, "Heartbeat" bw "Tell me" Which was originally released on the Avalon label. Sefel Records picked it up later that year for a wider distribution and released it on Sefel 45018 in 1982.

Mary Lu Zahalan had worked with producer, Randy Kumano and recorded "Turn of the Wheel". Backed with "Think of Me", it was released on Sefel 45-015 in 1982. It peaked at No. 25 on the RPM Contemporary Adult chart for the week of 28 August 1982. They were from her Think of Me album that was released on both the Sefel and Avalon labels.

Also in 1982, Nancy Nash's Letting Go album which was produced by herself and Fred Dalgleish was released on Sefel SEF 1011 and Avalon Music AVE 1011.
