= CKTS =

Former radio station in Sherbrooke, Quebec

- Sherbrooke, Quebec; Canada
- Frequency: 900 kHz
- Branding: CKTS 900

Programming
- Format: Contemporary hit radio; later News/talk

Ownership
- Owner: Corus Entertainment

History
- First air date: July 1, 1946
- Last air date: November 19, 2006

Technical information
- Class: B
- Power: 10,000 watts

CKTS was an English language Canadian radio station located in Sherbrooke, Quebec. It broadcast on 900 kHz with a power of 10,000 watts as a class B station, using a directional antenna which had a slightly directional pattern during the day and a much tighter pattern at night, to protect Class-A clear-channel station XEW-AM in Mexico City at night.

The station was shut down in 2006 by its owner, Corus Entertainment.

== History ==
CKTS went on the air on July 1, 1946. The station originally broadcast on 1240 kHz, and was operated by Telegram Printing & Publishing, the owner of the local weekly Sherbrooke Telegram-Observer. It was an affiliate of the Canadian Broadcasting Corporation's Trans-Canada Network by 1957. The station moved to 900 AM in 1959, and was sold to Telemedia in the late 1960s.

During the 1970s, it also aired programming produced by Radio Bishop's, the campus radio club of Bishop's University, which would later become CJMQ-FM.

CKTS-AM 900 had its antenna farm located close to 1643 Dion Road in St-Elie d'Orford (which has since become part of Sherbrooke). The four radio towers has since been taken down and dismantled.

As the English-speaking population declined in the Eastern Townships, the station tried to appeal to francophones, and by the mid-1970s the station had a Top 40 format with minimal spoken word content. Most of the advertising on the station was in French and most listeners were francophones, much to the displeasure of the Canadian Radio-television and Telecommunications Commission. The station changed its slogan to "Super Hits Sherbrooke K-900". Its short slogan was "K-K-K-900". The K-900 logo was written in red lettering on a white background. On air talent included Ted Silver, Daniel Coulombe and Frank Cavallaro.

The radio station moved its studios to a new location at 901 Galt Street West in Sherbrooke.

In 1989, the CRTC forced CKTS to use only English. As a result, by 1992 the station was acting as a de facto rebroadcaster of Standard Broadcasting's news/talk station CJAD in Montreal, with its only local programming consisting of a church service that aired every Sunday morning for half an hour.

Standard Broadcasting acquired Telemedia in 2002, bringing CJAD and CKTS under common ownership. However, Standard soon sold CKTS to Corus Entertainment in January 2005. Despite the fact that Corus had its own English news/talk radio station in Montreal, CINW, CKTS continued to air programming from CJAD.

== Shutdown ==
Due to high ongoing maintenance costs, the station was shut down on November 19, 2006, and its licence was voluntarily revoked as of December 13.
