= Change Records =

- Parent company: Sounds Interchange Ltd
- Founded: 1977
- Founder: Jeff Smith
- Status: defunct
- Distributors: Polydor Ltd, MCA (Canada)
- Genre: Various
- Country of origin: Canada
- Location: Toronto

Change Records was a Canadian Record label that was founded in 1977. Artists that have recorded for the label include Myles Cohen, Jim Mancel, Brian Plummer and Aura Urziceanu

== Background ==
Jeff Smith founded the label in 1977. It was a subsidiary of Sounds Interchange Ltd. John James Stewart who was the head of Sound Interchange's production company Inter-Productions handled the production of the majority of the label's early recordings.

Sounds Interchange which was located in Toronto was founded around the end of 1974 by Jeff Smith. By 1977 it had already made a name for itself as a quality studio. And artists who either did recording there or had their albums produced there included, Gladys Knight & The Pips, Ian Thomas, Shirley Eikhard, The Stampeders and Bruce Murray.

One artist who was quite prolific on Change Records was Bob Van Dyke.

== History ==
It was reported in the 21 January 1978 issue of RPM Weekly that Jeff Smith (president), John Stewart (A&R director) and Allen Shechtman (publishing houses manager) represented Change Records at MIDEM that year. They had a full house of CanCon material to make an impression on the international market. This included Myles Cohen, Jeannette Brantley, Jim Mancel and Aura. It was also reported that the label was having success in the country music field with Van Dyke who had released a single and an album.

In 1978, MCA Records entered into a distribution deal with Change Records. This marked MCA's first distribution deal with a domestic Canadian record label.

In 1980, Change Records and Sounds Interchange were sold to Syd Kessler's Kessler Music Corp.

== Artists and releases ==
Van Dyke's Deal Me In was the first album released on Change Records. On 25 November, a celebration organized by Change Records for the release of the album was held at Sounds Interchange. Among the attendees were representatives from Polydor Records, the Canadian distributors for Change Records.

It was reported in the 25 February 1978 issue of RPM Weekly that recording artists Myles and Van Dyke who had both released albums on Change were getting air-play action on their albums. Van Dyke's debut single "This Love Song" was currently climbing on RPM s Country Playlist chart.

Singer Aura had recorded a Jim Mancel composition, "L.A. Sunshine" which was released on Change CHD 300 in 1978. CHD 300. It was popular in the disco markets.

By December 1978, Ian Fletcher Kemp's single "Love Catch Fire" was already making progress and had been added to MOR, AOR, and country stations. It had also debuted at No. 49 on the RPM Adult Oriented Playlist for the week of 2 December. It debuted at No. 69 on the Country 75 Singles chart for the week of 30 December. Kemp's (Writer) album was produced by John Stewart at Sounds Interchange and was released on Change CLP-8006-J in 1979. It received a positive review in the 14 April 1979 issue of RPM Weekly, with the reviewer writing that "Fantasy and compassion fill the album"'. Because of the quality of the cuts on the album, Change was marketing the album in all formats regardless of its genre being country. His debut single, "Love Catch Fire" was already a country hit.

Brian Plummer was a former CBC technician who played in bands as a teenager. He dropped out of music and worked for the CBC. His debut album No Questions was reviewed in the 29 March 1980 issue of RPM Weekly. It was positive with the reviewer calling it "a hard driving rock album with a live band sound". The strong lyrics and the unusual, city-conscious themes were also noted. The single from the album was "Money Talks". The album was also on the CanCon Albums Medium Rotation list that week. His album was still on the CanCon Medium rotation list, and for the week of 29 June at Q107 in Toronto and the single "Money Talks" was on the CanCon Singles Playlisted list at CJME Music Radio.

== Company structure ==
=== 1977 ===
- Jeff Smith - owner
- Bob Johnson - national promotion manager
- John Stewart - general manager, A&R director
- Rita Gail - publishing administration
- Allen Schechtman - promotional coordination (working in liaison with Rita Gail)
