= Aaron Space =

Canadian rock group

- Genre: Rock music
- Label: Warner Bros.
- Spinoff of: Mudflat
- Past members: Bob DiSalle; Gene Falbo; Dave Moulaison; Jake Thomas

Aaron Space was a Canadian rock group that had a national hit with "Keep on Movin" in 1971. They had evolved out of a band called Mudflat.

== Background ==
The history of the group can be traced to two members of the group, Lighthouse who left the group. By 1970, Pinky Dauvin and Grant Fullerton had formed Mudflat. With two members leaving and a new one coming on board, the group eventually became Aaron Space. Aaron Space were handled by Capricorn Music Association, a Canadian booking agency from Toronto. They were allegedly seen in action by John Pozer who signed them to Warner Bros. A progressive rock type of group, they had a hit with their debut single.

Aaron space was made up of guitarist David Moulaison, Jake Thomas on guitar, Gene Falbo on bass and Bob DiSalle on drums. Guitarist Jake Thomas had previously been in the group Buckstone Hardware.

== Mudflat period ==
Mudflat was made up of Pinky Dauvin and Grant Fullerton who were previously with Lighthouse. Other band members were, David Moulaison on guitar, Gene Falbo on bass, and Bob DiSalle on drums. They were under exclusive management by Toronto company, Music Factory.

In 1970, Mudflat were booked to play at the Rock Hill Rock-In festival that ran from September 5 to September 6 that year. Other groups that were booked to appear there were Sound Spectrum from London, Ontario, Pour Soul from England, Madrigal from Hamilton and April from Orangeville. On September 20, Mudflat were warming up the crowds for Lighthouse at a free concert set up by radio station CHUM. It was a welcome back event for Lighthouse who had recently performed at the 1970 Isle of Wight Rock Festival. Mudflat were booked to play at the York Masonic Temple in Toronto on the 1st of November but the event never took place.

Also that month, RPM Weekly reported in their November 28 issue that Mudflat was becoming "top potential".

With Pinky wanting to concentrate on a solo career, the band broke up. Remaining members, David Moulaison, Gene Falbo and Bob DiSalle carried on with recruit Jake Thomas on lead guitar. They renamed themselves Aaron Space.

== Aaron Space career ==
With the remaining three Mudflat members and Jake Thomas, the group were now on the scene as Aaron Space.

In 1971, the group played a major role in the film Rip Off which was made in Canada. It was produced by Don Shebib. For the film, the group was fronted by Don Scardino, an artist recently discovered by Warner Brothers.

The group released their first single, "Keep On Movin'" bw "The Visitor". The backing vocalist on the single was Lisa Garber. By December 25, the single was noted as being in the Secondary Market with it being spun on CKRD in Red Deer and CHSC in St. Catharines. Also for the week ending December 25, 1971, their song "Keep on Movin'" had entered the RPM 100 Singles chart at #95. The single peaked at #83 on January 17, 1972.

By late March 1972, their single "Marsha" bw "When She Smiles" had been released on Warner Bros. CW-4010-P. Within the first week it was on playlists of CHSC, CKWS, CHLO, CFTR and CJOE where it was at #30 on their chart.

Their album was also issued in 1972. All of the tracks were composed by the members. There was a good amount of promotion, but it didn't make an impression in the charts. It did get good raves from critics.

The group went on a succession of short tours in Central Canada. There was some material written and some studio time with a view to releasing a follow up album. Their contract with their label was nearing its end and the group broke up.

== Later years ==
In later years, Grant Fullerton became a member of Fullerton Dam, Madcats and the Grant Fullerton Band.

Gene Falbo became a member of Jackson Hawke. He also played bass on Rena Gaile's 1992 single, "Daddy's School".

In 2018, their album was released on CD in Korea on the Big Pink label, BIG PINK 578 and then the following year in Japan.

== Members ==
=== Mudflat ===
- Pinky Dauvin - vocals, percussion
- Bob DiSalle - drums
- Gene Falbo - bass
- Grant Fullerton - guitar
- David Moulaison - guitar

=== Aaron Space ===
- Bob DiSalle - drums, percussion, vocals
- Gene Falbo - bass, vocals
- Dave Moulaison - rhythm guitar, vocals
- Jake Thomas - lead guitar, vocals

== Discography ==
=== Singles ===
Single
Act	Release	Catalogue	Year	Notes
Aaron Space	"Keep on Movin’" / "The Visitor"	Warner Bros CW-4008	1971	
Aaron Space	"Marsha" / "When She Smiles"	Warner Bros CW-4010	1972	

=== Albums ===
Aaron Space, Warner Bros WSC9011-P
No.	Track	Composer	Time	Notes
A1	"Keep On Moving"		3:15	
A2	"Silly Ceilings"		5:01	
A3	"When She Smiles"		3:02	
A4	"Man In a Yellow Car"		4:21	
A5	"Marsha"		1:58	
B1	"North Country Rock 'n' Roll"		3:39	
B2	"It Might Be You"		3:05	
B3	"The Loser"		2:43	
B4	"Fair Child"		3:23	
B5	"Rainbow Ride"		5:05	
