= Stitch in Tyme =

Canadian band

The Stitch in Tyme
- Origin: Canada
- Genres: Rock
- Years active: 1960s
- Labels: Arc, Yorkville, Flick
- Spinoffs: Soma
- Spinoff of: The Continentals, The Untouchables
- Past members: Pinky Dauvin; Grant Fullerton; Donnie Morris; Bob Murphy; Bruce Wheaton; John Yorke

Stitch in Tyme was a popular Canadian band that was active in the 1960s. They made the charts a number of times and had success with their version of "Got to Get You into My Life".

== Background ==
The history of Stitch in Tyme can be traced back to the merging of The Continentals and The Untouchables who were two bands from Nova Scotia. The group's members were Donnie Morris, Pinky Dauvin, Grant Fullerton, Bob Murphy, and John Yorke. They were signed to Arc Records by vice-president Bill Gilliland.

In 1967, they were described by Elvira Capreese in RPM Weekly as one of the most financially successful bands in the Toronto sound era. In addition to their level of popularity in Canada, they also played at the Expo 67.

In Toronto, their equipment was handled by Akron Express.

== Career ==
=== Early period ===
The Continentals were a high school band from Amherst, Nova Scotia that started out in 1962. The group was made up of Larry Rhindress on lead guitar, Bobby Ackles on rhythm guitar, Donnie Morris on bass and vocals, Victor (Pinky) Dauvin on drums and vocals, Bruce Wheaton on guitar and vocals and Louise Ormond on lead vocals. The Untouchables were from the Parrsboro area and were around from 1963 to 1965. This band was made up of Bob Murphy on guitar and vocals, Grant Fullerton on guitar and vocals, John Yorke on bass and vocals and Philip Canning on drums. It was reported by RPM Weekly in the 8 November 1965 issue that the local group was to soon record with the Arc label. Both of the bands were struggling and at some stage there was a merge with Continentals members, Donnie Morris and Pinky Dauvin merging with Untouchables members, Bob Murphy, Grant Fullerton and John Yorke to form a group called Golden Earing.

=== Signed to Arc Records ===
They moved to Toronto and changed their name to Stitch in Tyme.

In June 1966, the Stitch in Tyme released the single, "Dry Your Eyes" bw "Point of View" on Arc A 1133. Both sides were produced by T. DiMaria.

Along with Dee and Lee and the Roulettes, the group was booked to appear at the Winter Sports Show at the Coliseum in Toronto which ran from 2 to 5 November.

In late 1966, John Yorke left the band, and he was replaced by Bruce Wheaton who had been a member of The Continentals and had been a member of Chester & the Unknowns, backing singer Chester Boucher. It was around this time that Bill Gilland of Yorkville Records brought the band to the label.

=== "Got to Get You into My Life" ===
The group recorded their version of The Beatles' song "Got to Get You into My Life" in November 1966. Backed with "Dry Your Eyes", it was released on the Yorkville label.

The early radio chart action happened on 17 December 1966 where it registered on CFUN in Vancouver. It also saw action at CHUM in Toronto on their December 12/66 chart.

In her Big Scoop column for the week of 28 January, Elvira Capreese claimed that she had been told not to hype or review any singles in her column. However, she went against that instruction and said that the Stitch in Tyme version of "Got to Get You into My Life" was one of the best of its kind that she had heard in a long time. She also said that while it wasn't as good as the Beatles' version, it was still an excellent record and should be played at every radio station in Canada. Also that week, the record had moved from No. 19 to No. 14 in the Canadian Hits chart.

For the week of 4 February, the single debuted at No. 81 in the RPM 100 chart. The record peaked at No. 3 on the Canadian Hits chart and held that position for an additional week. The record also peaked at No. 36 on the RPM 100 chart for the week of 18 March.

Other radio action for the single included getting to No. 28 on the C-Funtastic Fifty and No. 2 on the C-FUN All Canadian Top Ten in Vancouver. It went to No. 12 in Kitchener, Ontario, and No. 16 on CHUM in Toronto. The single was listed as the No. 21 song for the year 1967 on CFNB in Fredericton, New Brunswick.

=== "New Dawn" ===
The group released the single "New Dawn" bw "Don't Make Promises" on Yorkville YV-45011 in August 1967.

For the week of 9 September, "New Dawn" was on the list at CHNS in Halifax, CJKL in Kirkland, CKPR in the Lakehead and CKNX in Wingham. It debuted at No. 95 in the RPM 100 chart and No. 12 in the RPM Canadian Hits chart. "New Dawn" peaked at No. 36 on the RPM 100 chart, and at No. 3 on the RPM Canadian Hits chart for the week of 28 October.

=== Further activities ===
In early 1968, the group started Flick Entertainment Corporation, which was their own label and publishing company.

It was reported by RPM Weekly in the 11 November 1968 issue that the group had not been on the record scene for some time, but they had been making money by doing personal appearances. They were also a sought-after group for television commercials. One was the "Hip Flip" which was a party game. The jingle was written by Stitch in Tyme members Grant Fullerton and Bob Murphy. The band also performed the music. The McConnell Eastman production was recorded at Hallmark studios.

During that year with the creation of their own label and publisher, they tried to release their single, "Stop Wastin' Time". Because things weren't cleared with the Yorkville / ARC labels, they were threatened with legal action and the single was blocked from release. However, it appears that the single managed to gain some popularity as it was a Top 30 hit in Fredericton.

== Break up ==
The band broke up around the end of 1968. Grant Fullerton and Pinky Dauvin both joined the group Lighthouse.

== Other projects ==
Bob Murphy went back to Nova Scotia and formed the country-rock band Soma with Bruce Wheaton and Donny Morris. The group recorded the single "Train". It debuted at No. 98 in the RPM 100 Singles chart for the week of 27 March 1971. It peaked at No. 54 for the week of 19 June.

Later Bruce Wheaton formed the group Everyday People which was named after the Sly & the Family Stone song of the same name. They had a hit in 1971 with "You Make Me Wonder", and "Nova Scotia Home Blues", in 1972 with "Feelin' Better Already" and in 1973 with "To-Day I Feel Like Being Happy".

Bob Murphy wrote and recorded the song "Don't Put the Blame on Me" which was credited to his band "Bob Murphy & Big Buffalo. It was a hit on the RPM Country chart, peaking at No. 25 in March 1975.

== Members ==
- John Yorke - vocals, 12 string and rhythm guitar
- Bruce Wheaton - guitar, vocals (replaced Yorke in late 1966)
- Grant Fullerton: guitar, vocals
- Bob Murphy - keyboards, leader vocals
- Donnie Morris - bass, vocals
- Pinky Dauvin - drums, vocals

== Later years ==
In 1990 with the song "Got to Get You into My Life" appearing on compilations, there was a renewed interest in the band which led to them regrouping. Having not performed together since their 1968 break up, They performed at The Toronto Rock Revival which was held at a venue called the Warehouse. The concert was released on a TV show titled The Boys Are Still in Town.

Donnie Morris played in the latter, last stages of group Molly Oliver, from February to July 1987, having replaced bassist Ian MacDougall.

Victor "Pinky" Dauvin died in Newmarket, Ontario in 2013.

== Discography ==
- The Stitch in Tyme - "Dry Your Eyes" / "Point of View" - Arc A 1133–1966
- The Stitch in Tyme - "Got to Get You into My Life" / "Dry Your Eyes" - Yorkville YV-45001 - 1966
- The Stitch in Tyme - "New Dawn" / "Don't Make Promises" (Instrumental) - York YV-45011 - 1967
- The Stitch in Tyme - "Stop Wastin' Time" / "?" - Flick - 196? (single blocked from release)
- The Stitch in Tyme, Terry Black - "Got to Get You into My Life" / "Little Liar" - Arc URM-9001 - 19??
