= Streetgame =

1981 album by Madcats

Studio album by Madcats
- Released: 1981
- Studios: Phase I Studios, Toronto
- Label: Freedom Inc. FR-004
- Producer: Jack Richardson

Madcats chronology
Madcats (1979)	Streetgame (1981)

Streetgame is an album by Canadian rock band Madcats that was released on the Freedom Records Inc. label in 1981.

== Background ==
The album was produced by Jack Richardson of Phase One Studios in Toronto. The album was released after they had signed with the newly-formed Freedom Records label. One of the musicians that played on the album was new member, bassist, Clarence Greer.

Following the success of the first album, Streetgame turned out to be a disappointment. There were two years between the release of the first one and Streetgame. According to Grant Fullerton, they started work on the album too late. Also, the album didn't sound like the first one and he felt that they sunk their boat with this one. Their new manager William Tenn said that because the album didn't do that well and issues with bookings, the band was ready to throw in the towel. But they changed their sound and their name to the Grant Fullerton Band.

It was reported in the 23 May issue of Record World that the album had just been released.

== Reception ==
The album was reviewed in the 18 April issue of RPM Weekly. The reviewer wrote that the material on the album was flat out rock and roll that was designed for the AM rock and AOR formats. The songs top songs mentioned were, "Call it Quits" which was written by Bobby Blake, the Lovin Spoonful hit, "Summer in the City", "Execution" and "More You than Me".

It was reported in the 23 May issue of Cash Box that the album was getting a good reaction from radio programmers in Canada.

== Singles ==
Two singles from the album, "Summer in the City" and "Call It Quits" managed to make the charts.

== Track listing ==
=== A ===
1. "Street Game"
2. "Call It Quits"
3. "Long Distance Callin'"
4. "Save Me"
5. "Young Man's World"

=== B ===
1. "More You Than Me""
2. "Brown Baggin'"
3. "Execution"
4. "I Like It"
5. "Summer in the City"
6. "My Baby"

== Musicians ==
- Grant Fullerton - lead guitar, lead vocals
- Bobby Blake - guitar, lead vocals
- Brad MacDonald - keyboards, vocal
- Glen Gratto - drums, vocal
- Clarence Greer - bass
