= Mad Cat =

Mad Cat may refer to:

- M.A.D. Cat, or "Dr Claw" in the TV series Inspector Gadget
- Mad Catz, a third-party video game accessory maker
- Madcat, a video game live streaming platform, renamed Trovo
- Madcats, Canadian band
  - Madcats (album), the band's debut album
