= Everywhere =

Everywhere may refer to:

- Everywhere (band)
- Everywhere (Roswell Rudd album), 1966
- Everywhere (Gerald Wilson album), 1968
- "Everywhere" (Pepper Tree song), 1970
- Everywhere (Tim McGraw album), 1997
  - "Everywhere" (Tim McGraw song), title track from the album
- "Everywhere" (Fleetwood Mac song), 1987
- "Everywhere" (Michelle Branch song), 2001
- Everywhere (Maaya Sakamoto album), 2010
- "Everywhere", the first of three discs from Lupe Fiasco's forthcoming album LupE.N.D.
- "Everywhere", a song by Niall Horan from his 2020 album Heartbreak Weather
- Everywhere (video game), an open world video game
- "Everywhere at the end of time", a song by the caretaker
