= Molly Oliver (album) =

Studio album by Molly Oliver
- Released: 1979
- Studio: Solar Audio
- Label: London DL 3023
- Producer: Bruce Wheaton

Molly Oliver is a 1979 album by the group Molly Oliver. It contains the chart hit "You Didn't Listen to Me". The album had a charting run for fourteen weeks.

== Background ==
Molly Oliver was a five-piece band led by Bruce Wheaton who was a member of Stitch in Tyme and Everyday People. The album, which was produced by bandleader Wheaton was recorded at Solar Audio in Dartmouth. It was released on London DL 3023 in 1979.

== Reception ==
Music trade magazine RPM Weekly referred to the album as a solid debut in its 10 March issue.

Guy Lepage of the Ottawa Citizen referred to the album in the publications 2 March issue as their dynamite new album.

According to the 10 March issue of RPM Weekly, the single, "You Didn't Listen to Me" hadn't yet charted but since it had been added to radio playlists, it was showing action.

== Airplay ==
By 31 March, the album had been receiving a month's worth of substantial amount of airplay since its release.

== Charts ==
The album debuted at No. 100 in the RPM 100 Albums chart for the week of 10 March. For the week of 28 April, the record was at No. 77 in its eighth charting week. At week fourteen the album was still in the chart at No. 96.

== Singles ==
"You Didn't Listen to Me" backed with "Open Up" was released on London LX 2681 in 1979. The single debuted at No. 97 in the RPM 100 Singles chart for the week of 17 March. For the week of 5 May, and in its seventh charting week, the single was at No. 72. It was still at No. 72 the following week.

The single, "Somebody New in My Eyes" backed with "Hey There" was released on London LX 2681. As shown in the 23 February 1980 issue of RPM Weekly, the song was playlisted at CFTJ in Cambridge. The following week, it was playlisted at CJCJ in Woodstock, and CKIQ in Kelowna. As shown in the 8 March issue of RPM Weekly, "Somebody New in My Eyes" was one of the playlisted Cancon singles. It was also at No. 48 on the play chart at CKBW in Bridgewater. It was still on the CFCN Cancon singles playlist as shown in the 15 March issue of RPM Weekly.

== Track listing ==
=== A ===
1. "Hey There" - B. Wheaton - 3:13
2. "You Didn't Listen to Me" - B. Wheaton - 3:11
3. "Somebody New in My Eyes" - B. Wheaton - 4:08
4. "Carry On" - S. Stills - 5:17

=== B ===
1. "Greet Your Neighbor" - B. Wheaton - 3:34
2. "Where Do We Go" - B. Wheaton - 3:10
3. "Living A Dream" - B. Wheaton - 6:27
4. "Rock 'N' Roll Music" - B. Wheaton - 5:04

== Credits ==
=== Musicians ===
- Bass – Carson Richards
- Drums, Percussion – Ian MacMillan
- Keyboards, vocals – Michael Leggat
- Lead Guitar, Congas, Vocals
- Rhythm guitar, vocals -
- Vocals, Rhythm Guitar – Larry Maillet

=== Techinical and production ===
- Arranger – Molly Oliver
- Arranger (strings) – Paul Mason
- Engineer – Harold Tsistinas
- Mixing - Bruce Wheaton
- Producer – Bruce Wheaton
