= Bruce Wheaton =

Canadian rock musician

- Born: 1946 (age 79–80)
- Origin: Amherst, Nova Scotia, Canada
- Genre: Rock
- Occupation: Musician
- Instruments: Guitar, congas, vocals
- Years active: 1960s - present
- Formerly of: The Continentals, The Vibrasonics, Chester & The Unknowns, The Purple Hearts, Stitch in Tyme, Soma, Everyday People, Molly Oliver

Bruce Wheaton is a Canadian rock musician, composer and former band leader who has been active since the 1960s. He was a key member of the Canadian rock groups which include Stitch in Tyme, Everyday People and Molly Oliver. He either wrote or co-wrote the charting songs, "Feelin' Better Already", "Nova Scotia Home Blues", "To-Day I Feel Like Being Happy", "You Didn't Listen to Me" and "You Make Me Wonder".

== Background ==
Wheaton started his musical career in the late 1960s. He was a key member in the groups, The Stitch in Tyme, Everyday People and Molly Oliver. After winding up Molly Oliver, he embarked on a solo career where he found success and played throughout Canada.

He has been described by Flea Market Funk as a Maritimes music legend.

== Career ==
=== The Continentals ===
Wheaton was a member of The Continentals, a high school band from Amherst N.S that started out in 1962. In addition to himself on guitar and vocals, the group included Larry Rhindress on lead guitar, Bobby Ackles on rhythm guitar, Donnie Morris on bass and vocals, Victor (Pinky) Dauvin on drums and vocals and Louise Ormond on lead vocals.

=== Further activities ===
It was in 1964 and while in the RCAF that he formed The Vibrasonic where he was the lead vocalist and guitarist. In 1965, he was transferred to a Canadian Forces detachment in the Toronto suburb of Downsview. While there he became a member of Chester & the Unknowns which featured Chester Boucher on lead vocals. The group managed to appear on A Go Go ’66, a television show in Toronto during 1956 and 1966. He was with another band called the Purple Hearts for a period of time. By the end of 1966 he had taken up the offer by Donnie Morris and Pinky Dauvin to Join Stitch in Tyme.

=== Stitch in Tyme ===
Stitch in Tyme was made up of Donnie Morris, Pinky Dauvin, Grant Fullerton, Bob Murphy, and John Yorke. They were signed to Arc Records by vice-president Bill Gilliland. Wheaton joined Stitch in Tyme around the time the group Bill Gilland of Yorkville Records brought the band to the label. He replaced band member John Yorke who had left the group. The group would be described by Elvira Capreese of RPM Weekly as one of the most financially successful bands in the Toronto sound era.

The group had success with their version of "Got to Get You into My Life" which peaked at No. 36 on the RPM 100 chart for the week of 18 March 1967. They also had success with "New Dawn" which peaked at No. 36 on the RPM 100 chart, and at No. 3 on the RPM Canadian Hits chart for the week of 28 October.

The group broke up around the end of 1968.

=== Soma ===
Having left Stitch in Tyme and needing a change, Wheaton would find his way into Soma. Along Donny Morris and Bob Murphy to form the group. They had success with the song "Train" which made it to 54 in Canada for the week of 19 June 1971.

=== Everyday People ===
With himself on lead guitar and lead vocals, Carson Richards on bass and vocals, Pamela Marsh on keyboards and vocals, Chris Papputts on keyboards and vocals, David Hare on keyboards and Alan Muggeridge on drums, he formed the group Everyday People which was named after the Sly & the Family Stone song of the same name. Along with Dr. Music, they would prove to be one of the key acts for the GRT Records label. In addition to leading Everyday People, he did most of the composition work for them.

He wrote "You Make Me Wonder" and with Pamela Marsh co-wrote "Nova Scotia Home Blues" which were released on single, GRT 1233-01 in November 1970. "Nova Scotia Home Blues" was the first to chart, debuting at No. 27 on the RPM MOR Playlist chart for the week of 12 December. "You Make Me Wonder" debuted a week later on the RPM 100 Singles chart at No. 75. It peaked at No. 60 for the week of 9 January 1971.

It was reported in the January / February 1972 issue of The Music Scene that Wheaton's group "Everyday People" had recently completed the tracks for their debut album at the Toronto Sound Studio.

The group's single "I Like What I Like" bw "Don't Wait for Tomorrow" which was produced by Terry Brown was released on GRT 1233-12 in March 1972. Wheaton composed both sides. According to the 4 March issue of RPM Weekly, their label GRT got behind the song for a nation-wide push. The song was also on the playlist of CKXL in Calgary. The song would later become an underground dance hit in North American dance clubs and achieve a type of cult status. After she left the Mamas & the Papas, Cass Elliott recorded the song and put her own spin on it.

Wheaton composed "Feelin' Better Already" which Everyday People recorded at Toronto Sound Studios. It debuted at No. 98 in the RPM 100 Singles chart for the week of 22 July 1972, and at No. 9 in the RPM Top 30 MAPL Chart for the week of 19 August. It peaked at No. 6 on the RPM Top 30 MAPL chart for the week of 9 September. It also peaked at No. 37 on the RPM 100 Singles chart that same week.

Wheaton wrote "To-Day I Feel Like Being Happy" which peaked at No. 31 on the RPM Weekly Adult Contemporary Playlist chart for the week of 16 June 1973.

Wheaton remained with Everyday People until 1974 and did his final tour with them. He decided to move to Halifax, Nova Scotia. There he was based in the Maritimes and he continued his musical career.

=== Molly Oliver ===
Following the break-up of Everyday People, Wheaton and bassist Carson Richards went on to create Molly Oliver. Tim Garagan and Bob Quinn had been members of the rock group Pepper Tree. They also pulled in Tim Garagan and Bob Quinn had been members of the rock group Pepper Tree.

Wheaton wrote "You Didn't Listen to Me" and "Open Up" which were recorded by Molly Oliver and released on London LX 2681 with "You Didn't Listen to Me" as the A side in 1979. The record debuted at No. 97 in the RPM 100 Singles chart for the week of 17 March. For the week of 5 May, and in its seventh charting week, the single was at No. 72. It was still at No. 72 the following week.

Molly Oliver broke up in 1987.

=== Further activities ===
In 1987, "Keep On Givin'", a record for the Canadian Red Cross Society was released. It featured Wheaton on guitar, Peter Jackson on keyboards, Mike Leggatt on keyboards, Mike Gaudet on bass, Neil Robertson on drums and about twenty-two other artists on vocals etc.

In April 2020, Wheaton released the song "Love Looks Good on Us".
