= Pretty Lady (Lighthouse song) =

Single by Lighthouse

from the album Can You Feel It
- B-side: "Bright Side"
- Released: September 1973
- Recorded: 1973
- Genre: Pop, jazz fusion
- Length: 3:57 (album); 3:10 (single)
- Label: Polydor (US), GRT (Canada)
- Songwriter: Skip Prokop
- Producer: Jimmy Ienner

Lighthouse singles chronology
"Broken Guitar Blues" (1973)	"Pretty Lady" (1973)	"Can You Feel It?" (1974)

"Pretty Lady" is a 1973 song by Canadian rock band Lighthouse. The song was the lead single of three released from their Can You Feel It LP. It was written by lead singer Skip Prokop.

The song spent eight weeks on the US Billboard Hot 100, debuting at number 100 the week of 3 November 1973 and peaking at number 53 the week of 15 December 1973. It also reached number 31 on the Cash Box chart. It was their final charting single in the United States, and became their third greatest hit. It was the group's second of two hits on the Adult Contemporary chart, reaching number 38, after "One Fine Morning" had hit number 30 two years earlier.

In their native Canada, "Pretty Lady" reached the Top 10, and was not their final hit. It reached as high as number nine, for two weeks during the winter of 1974.

== In popular culture ==
- An intoxicated Sam Losco sang it to a Barbara Lahey in an episode of the popular Canadian sitcom Trailer Park Boys.
- The song was covered by the Trans-Canada Highwaymen for their 2023 album, Explosive Hits Vol. 1.
- In 2025, the song was recorded and performed by the award winning Carolina Beach Band, North Tower from Raleigh, North Carolina, USA. "Pretty Lady" has continued to remain #1 on several beach music radio stations for over 47 weeks as of August 2026.

== Chart history ==
=== Weekly charts ===
Chart (1973–74)	Peak position
Canada RPM Top Singles	9
Canada CHUM Top 30 Airplay	6
U.S. Billboard Top Canadian Singles	5
U.S. Cash Box Top Canadian Singles	2
Hawaii Airplay	1
U.S. Billboard Hot 100	53
U.S. Billboard Easy Listening	38
U.S. Record World Top Singles	33
U.S. Cash Box Top 100	31
Canada CKLW Top 30 Airplay	17

=== Year-end charts ===
Chart (1973)	Rank
Canada RPM Top Singles	60
Canada CHUM Year End Singles	84
