= Russ Little =

Russ Little may refer to:

- Russ Little, musician and member of Lighthouse
- Russ Little, political activist and member of the Symbionese Liberation Army
