= Don't Put the Blame on Me =

Song by Bob Murphy & Big Buffalo
- A-side: "Don't Put the Blame on Me"
- B-side: "Save Me"
- Released: 1974
- Length: 2:58
- Label: Broadland BR 2107X
- Composer: Bob Murphy
- Producer: Gary Buck

Canada chronology
"Don't Put the Blame on Me" (1974)	"Papa's Wagon" (1975)

"Don't Put the Blame on Me" is a 1974 single by Canadian band Bob Murphy & Big Buffalo. It was hit for the group that year.

== Background ==
"Don't Put the Blame on Me" was written by Bob Murphy. It was recorded by himself and his backing group the Big Buffalo. Backed with his composition, "Save Me", it was released on Broadland BR 2107X in 1974.

As reported in the 1 February 1975 issue of RPM Weekly, Broadland Records were seeing chart additions and play listings almost daily for "Don't Put the Blame on Me" by Bob Murphy & Big Buffalo, "Kock on My Door" by Darlene Madill and "I'll Be Seeing You Someday" by Patti MacDonnell.

The song appears on the Country's Best, The Best of Broadland compilation, released on Broadland BR 1930-M in 1976.

== Reception ==
According to the 21 December issue of RPM Weekly, Paul Kennedy of Radio CKDH in Amherst felt that "Don't Put the Blame on Me" would go a long way.

== Airplay ==
As shown in the 21 December 1974 issue of RPM weekly, had been playlisted at CKDH in Amherst.

The 1 February 1975 issue of RPM Weekly showed that "Don't Put the Blame on Me" had been playlisted on CJET at Smiths Falls.

As shown in the 29 March issue of RPM Weekly, the single had charted at CFCY in Charlottetown.

== Charts ==
"Don't Put the Blame on Me" debuted at No. 46 in the RPM Weekly RPM Country Playlist chart for the week of 21 December 1974. At week eleven, for the week of 15 March, the single peaked at No. 25.
