= You Didn't Listen to Me =

Song by Molly Oliver

from the album Molly Oliver
- A-side: "You Didn't Listen to Me"
- B-side: "Open Up"
- Released: 1979
- Length: 3:08
- Label: London
- Composer: B. Wheaton
- Producer: Bruce Wheaton

Canada chronology
"Somebody New In My Eyes" (1978)	"You Didn't Listen to Me" (1979)

"You Didn't Listen to Me" is a 1979 single by Canadian rock group Molly Oliver. It registered on the RPM 100 singles chart that year.

== Background ==
"You Didn't Listen to Me" backed with "Open Up" was released on London LX 2681 in 1979. Both sides were written by Bruce Wheaton. The song also appears on the group's 1979 self-titled album.

The musicians who played on the recording were, Larry Maillet on lead vocal & rhythm guitar, Bruce Wheaton on vocals and lead guitar, Michael Leggat on vocals & keyboards, Carson Richards on bass guitar, and Ken "Dutch" Schultz on drums.

== Reception ==
According to the 10 March issue of RPM Weekly, the single, "You Didn't Listen to Me" hadn't yet charted but since it had been added to radio playlists, it was showing action.

== Airplay ==
For the week of 10 March, "You Didn't Listen to Me" was added to the playlist of CKXL in Calgary. For the week of 24 March, it was playlisted at CJNB in North Battleford, CHLO in St. Thomas, and was at No. 38 at CJCJ in Woodstock. It was also playlisted at CFVR in Abbotsford, CJFX in Antigonish and CKOV in Kelowna. For the week of 7 April, the song had been playlisted at CJOY in Guelph.

== Charts ==
The single debuted at No. 97 in the RPM 100 Singles chart for the week of 17 March. For the week of 5 May, and in its seventh charting week, the single was at No. 72. It was still at No. 72 the following week.
