= Madcats (album) =

Studio album by Madcats
- Released: 1978
- Label: Skyline SKY 10166
- Producer: John Driscoll

Madcats chronology
| Madcats (1978) | Streetgame (1981) |

Madcats is the 1979 debut album by Canadian rock band Madcats. It had a level of success and made the RPM Weekly album chart that year.

== Background ==
Working with producer, John Driscoll, Madcats recorded their self-titled album, which was released on Skyline SKY 10166 in 1978.

It was reported in the 27 May 1978 issue of RPM Weekly that a major promotional campaign for the group by Quality Records was underway. The campaign was called "Madcats Go Gold". A special limited edition of the group's album which had the disc on gold colored vinyl was produced. At the start of the campaign, the album sales were at 6000. But when the campaign was reported on in the 9 May issue, the sales had quadrupled.

== Reception ==
It had a positive review in the 4 March issue of RPM Weekly with the reviewer calling it "Top fare for the AOR crowd".

The US release of album wouldn't be reviewed by Walrus until 1979. It was previously only available in the United States as an import, and did have an earlier review, but was now available in the US in 1979 on Buddah SOS 5718. It was reviewed in the 23 April issue of the magazine. In this issue the reviewer noted the strong voices of Grant Fullerton and Bobby Blake. However the arranging was said to be standard rock and Fullerton's lyric writing needed work, but there was still potential with the album.

== Charts ==
The album debuted at No. 100 in the RPM 100 Albums chart for the week of 15 April 1978. It would eventually peak at No. 47 for the week of 24 June.

== Awards ==
The album designers Alan Gee and Greg Lawson won a Juno Award in 1979, in the Best Graphics category.

== Track listing ==
=== A ===
1. "Freewheelin'" - 4:10
2. "Woman's Got the Power Over Me" - 4:29
3. "Teenage Valentino" - 7:53
4. "She's Got It" - 3:43

=== B ===
1. "Prisoner Of Your Love" - 3:26
2. "I'm Not a Free Man" - 4:55
3. "We Can Get the Feelin" - 3:43
4. "Take All the Love" - 3:35
5. "Too Late for Love" - 3:41
