= One Fine Morning =

One Fine Morning may refer to:

- One Fine Morning (film), 2022 film directed by Mia Hansen-Løve
- "One Fine Morning" (song), 1971 song by Lighthouse
