= Mr. Love (song) =

Song by Vehicle

from the album Vehicle
- A-side: "Mr. Love"
- B-side: "Da-Nite Shuffle"
- Released: 1977
- Label: Skyline Records Inc.
- Composer: Wall
- Producer: John Dee Driscoll

Canada chronology
"Mr. Love" (1977)	"You Could Have Been a Star" (1978)

"Mr. Love" is a 1977 single by Canadian rock group Vehicle. It charted for them that year on the RPM Top 100 Singles chart.

== Background ==
Vehicle were a Grimsby, Ontario-based band who had been actively performing in Hamilton for some time prior to the release of their single "Mr. Love". The John Dee Driscoll produced song was backed with "Da-Nite Shuffle" and released on Skyline Records SKY 015X in 1977. The lead singer on the song was Owen Smith.

The national breakout status for the single was confirmed in the 27 August issue of RPM Weekly. The single was quickly becoming a hit in Canada.

The record was released in the United States on Roadshow 1089.

== Reception ==
Even before the official release, "Mr. Love" caused a heavy favorable reaction amongst radio programmers. And both CHUM in Toronto and CKOC in Hamilton had it as an instant add on before it was released.

In the United States, it was in Gary Taylor's Personal Picks section of the 7 October issue of The Gavin Report. He also wrote that this "left field choice" was pulling on the Top Ten phones in Toronto.

The single was reviewed in the Record World Hits of the Week section for the week of 22 October where it was one of the four sleepers. The reviewer wrote that it sounded like a children's marching song that was given rock & roll treatment that almost demanded a sing along from the listener. The good production effects and acapella chorus were also noted.

It was reported in the 5 November issue of RPM Weekly that the single which had been released in the United States three weeks prior was receiving favorable action there. A range of top U.S. trades and tip sheets had Mr. Love as a pick. Roadshow Records who Quality Records had entered into a US release agreement was planning an all-out campaign for the group's single and album. Quality was also in the process of selecting a second single from the album.

== Airplay ==
For the week of 23 July, "Mr. Love" was at No. 37 at CKOC in Hamilton.

For the week of 27 August, "Mr. Love" was at No. 47 at CKOM in Saskatoon, 47 at CKBC in Bathurst and 37 at CFSL in Weyburn.

== Charts ==
Even though the alphabetical listing of the singles in the 23 July issue of RPM Weekly had "Mr. Love" at No. 95, it was actually at its debut position of No. 100 in the RPM 100 Singles chart. The single eventually peaked at No. 25. For the week of 22 October, at week fourteen, it was still in the chart at No. 42.

It also made the Canadian Recording Industry Association National Best Selling Record chart.

== Musicians ==
- Carlo Dibattista
- Tom Smith
- Martin Wall
- Gary Pratt
- Richard Hawksby
- Scott Wilson
