= Grant Fullerton =

Canadian rock guitarist

- Genres: Rock
- Occupation: Musician
- Instruments: Bass, guitar, vocals
- Formerly of: The Untouchables, Golden Earing, The Stitch in Tyme, Lighthouse, Mudflat, Flag, Fullerton Dam, The Madcats and The Grant Fullerton Band, Jamnation

Grant Fullerton is a Canadian rock guitarist, bass guitarist and former bandleader. He has been a member of Canadian rock groups, The Stitch in Tyme, Lighthouse, Fullerton Dam, The Madcats and The Grant Fullerton Band.

== Background ==
Guitarist Fullerton who grew up in Parrsboro, Nova Scotia, started out at age fourteen, playing his uncle's guitar. He was also singing and composing from that young age.

Fullerton started out professionally in Halifax in the group The Untouchables. Later with The Stitch in Tyme, they had a hit with "Got to Get You into My Life". He co-founded the group Lighthouse and played on three of their albums. In 1974, he and Brad MacDonald formed the Fullerton Dam and had a degree of success. Later, he helped form The Madcats, which he wrote most of the material for. Other bands Fullerton has been a member of include Mudflat, Friends and Flag. According to Billboard, Fullerton was regarded as something of a legend in Canada for his musical involvement.

== Career ==
=== The Untouchables ===
The Untouchables were a band from Parrsboro, Nova Scotia who were active from around 1963 to 1965. The band was made up of Fullerton on guitar and vocals, Bob Murphy on guitar and vocals, John Yorke on bass and vocals and Philip Canning on drums. It was reported in the 8 November 1965 issue of RPM Weekly that the local group would record with the Arc label. Murphy, Fullerton and Yorke would later form The Stitch in Tyme.

=== Stitch in Tyme ===
The group was born out of a combination of members from two bands. Donnie Morris and Pinky Dauvin from The Continentals merged with Untouchables members; Murphy, Fullerton and Yorke, to form The Golden Earing. They relocated to Toronto, signed a record deal with Arc and then changed their name. Bill Gilliland of the Arc label was their manager. They went on to have hits with "Got to Get You into My Life" and "New Dawn".

=== Lighthouse ===
In December 1969, bassist Fullerton and singer/percussionist Pinky Dauvin joined Lighthouse. He played bass and sang on the group's albums Lighthouse, Suite Feeling and Peacing It All Together, all released in 1969.

=== Further activities ===
In the 1970s, Fullerton and Pinky Dauvin were members of the group Mudflat. The group opened for Lighthouse at the City Hall, Toronto, on 20 September 1970.

=== Flag ===
In late 1972, Music Shoppe, a Toronto management firm, announced the formation of the group Flag, composed of three veterans of the Canadian music scene. It was made up of Fullerton (group's leader), Pat Little, formerly of Luke & The Apostles, and Joe Agnello, formerly with Leigh Ashford and Grant Smith & The Power. The name of the group comes from their names, Fullerton Little Agnello Group. They were managed by Ray Daniels, who was confident of a record deal soon. Planned appearances were at Toronto clubs: The Gasworks, Coal Bin, El Mocambo and Picadilly Tube. They were also to appear throughout Ontario. They recorded the single "Do Do" bw "I’ve Been Waiting", which was released on Taurus TR-001 in September 1973. The single charted, making it to No.83 on the RPM Top 100 singles chart that November.

While with the group, Fullerton suffered a collapsed lung, and as reported in the 20 July 1974 issue of RPM Weekly, he was out of action and recuperating at his home in Nova Scotia.

=== Fullerton Dam ===
It was reported in the 21 June 1975 issue of RPM Weekly that Fullerton's band Fullerton Dam had signed a long-term contract with Polydor. They had released the single "You Didn't Break My Heart". At the time, the group was made up of Fullerton on guitar and vocals, Brad MacDonald on keyboards and vocals, Larry Brohman on bass and vocals and Steve Nagus on drums. The group released the single "My Lady" on Condor 97801. It debuted at No. 96 in the RPM 100 chart for the week of 12 June 1976. At week five in the chart, the single peaked at No. 70 for the week of 10 July and held the position for an additional week.

By July, Fullerton was having to deny rumors that his group had split up. The group had apparently lost their drummer, and while they were auditioning replacements, the group was taking time out to write new material.

=== Further activities ===
Fullerton was pictured on the cover of the 16 January 1982 issue of RPM Weekly.

=== Madcats ===
Fullerton wrote all the material for the Matcats' self-titled album that was released on Skyline SKY 10166-M in 1978. It received a positive review in the 4 March issue of RPM Weekly, with the reviewer writing that he was particularly inspiring interpreting his own lyrics.

=== Further activities ===
In 1986 Fullerton released the single "Lenny" bw "I Just Gotta Survive" on Freedom Records Inc. FR45-038.

Fullerton starred in the 1989 film Vacant Lot, directed by William D. MacGillivray. He played the part of David, a down-and-out rock guitarist who is hired by an aspiring Canadian all-girl punk band and develops a friendship with Trudi, an emotionally scarred member of the band. The film also starred Trudi Peterson and Barbara Nicholson.

Fullerton and his five-piece band Jamnation were booked to appear at the Strawberry Festival on 1 July 2010. Other members were Alec Fraser, who had played with David Wilcox and the Jeff Healey Band, tenor sax player John Pancychun, keyboardist Michael Fonfara who played with the Electric Flag, Downchild Blues Band, Lou Reed and Alice Cooper, and drummer Billy Campbell, who at the time was also playing in the Sensations.

On 8 June 2024, Fullerton performed a private outdoor concert at the Sandycove Acres.
