= The Minglewood Band =

Canadian music group

- Origin: Cape Breton Island, Nova Scotia, Canada
- Genres: Rock music
- Years active: 1969–1986
- Labels: RCA, Columbia Records
- Past members: Matt Minglewood; Donnie Hann; Bob Woods; Mark MacMillan; Paul Dunn; Enver Sampson Jr.

The Minglewood Band was a Canadian rock group from Cape Breton, Nova Scotia that was active in the 1970s and 1980s. The group received a 1980 Juno Award nomination for the Most Promising Group of the Year.

The Minglewood Band was founded in the late 1960s by guitarist/vocalist Matt Minglewood, with bassist/vocalist Donnie Hann, percussionist Bob Woods, guitarist Mark MacMillan, and vocalist Paul Dunn. Vocalist Enver Sampson Jr. joined the group in the early 1970s. The Minglewood Band independently released their self-titled debut album in 1976. The group was signed by RCA Records in 1979, but in 1982 they shortened their name to just Minglewood and switched labels to Columbia Records. At this same time guitarist Mark McMillan left the group and was replaced by George Antoniak.

The band was included on an Eastern Alliance Records compilation album that also featured, Molly Oliver, Oakley, Dutch Mason, Titan, Sam Moon, the Battery, Spice, and Ram. It was released around September 1982.

== Discography ==
- The Minglewood Band (Independent, 1976)
- The Minglewood Band (RCA, 1979) (CAN #60)
- Moving (1980) (CAN #57)
- Out on a Limb (1981) (CAN #38)
- Smokers: Best of The Minglewood Band (1982)
- M5 (1982) (CAN #43)
- Me And the Boys (1985) (Matt Minglewood solo album)
- The Promise (1988) (Matt Minglewood solo album)
- The Best of the Minglewood Band (1992)

=== Singles ===
| Year | Single | Chart Positions | | | Album |
| Year | Single | CAN Country | CAN | CAN AC | Album |
|---|---|---|---|---|---|
| 1979 | "Ain't What It Used To Be" | — | 84 | — | The Minglewood Band |
| 1981 | "Out On A Limb" | — | — | 21 | Out On A Limb |
| 1985 | "Livin' Outside of the Law" | 41 | — | — | Me and the Boys |
| 1985 | "Me and the Boys" | — | 94 | — | Me and the Boys |
| 1986 | "Georgia On A Fast Train" | 24 | — | — | Me and the Boys |
| 1987 | "Cajun Stars" | 34 | — | — | The Promise |
| 1988 | "You Win Again" | 30 | — | — | The Promise |
