= Goin' to the Country =

Single by Young
- B-side: "Grape Farm"
- Released: 1971
- Length: 2:33
- Label: Ampex
- Composer: Bruce Gordon
- Producer: John Dee Driscoll

Young singles chronology
"Goin' to the Country" (1971)	"The Rain Came Down" (1971)

"Goin' to the Country" is a 1971 single by Canadian rock group Young. It was a hit in Canada and also created interest in the United States.

== Background ==
Young recorded "Goin' to the Country" and "Grape Farm" on Ampex AC 1301. Produced by John Driscoll, the A side "Goin' to the Country" was composed by Bruce Gordon and the B side was composed by Rocco Ferrill. The two songs were the first published by Skyline North, a new publishing company established by Ampex Music.

Bases on the success of "Goin' to the Country", there was expectation that the follow-up single "The Rain Came Down" bw "We Got Time" would do well. It was given a 75% charting probability.

== Reception ==
The single was reviewed in the New MAPL Releases section of the 10 April issue of RPM Weekly. The reviewer wrote that the song was heavy enough to make the free-formers pleased and it was good for the Top 40 format and aggressive promotion could get it across the country. There was also speculation that the B side could out-do the A side.

It was reported in the 22 May issue of Record World that the Young single which was a big hit in Canada was now being well-received in the US.

== Airplay ==
It was reported in the 3 April issue of RPM Weekly that "Goin' to the Country" was seeing regional action. It was reported in the 10 April issue of RPM Weekly that "Goin' to the Country" was seeing regional action. It was reported on page 11 that the regional action was strong. This trend continued into the following week.

It was smash at nineteen Canadian stations which included CKOC, CKOM, CKBB, CKDH, CKFH, CHLO, CJRW and CKCW.

== Charts ==
For the week of 24 April, the single debuted at No. 80 on the RPM Weekly RPM 100 Singles chart. It peaked at No. 37 for the week of 22 May. It was still in the chart at No. 81 for the week of 19 June.
