= Karen Silver =

- Born: Toronto, Canada
- Occupations: Singer, session musician, beautician
- Instrument: Voice
- Labels: Skyline Records, Quality Records, Arista, RFC Records, Unidisc
- Formerly of: Star City

Karen Silver is a Canadian singer who found success in the late 1970s and early 1980s with a number of disco singles. She is mostly remembered for her hit cover of "Hold on I'm Coming'".

== Background ==
Karen Silver was born in Toronto, Canada. In her early days she was part of the Canadian Rock Theater and had prominent roles in Jesus Christ Superstar and Godspell.

From the early 1970s to about 1977, she was in Los Angeles and then returned to Toronto. She also wrote her own material. She started singing professionally in 1978 as part of the disco group Star City of which she was the lead vocalist. The group made the Top 10 with their disco version of Spencer Davis' song "I'm a Man".

Bands that she has worked with or been part of include, Star City, Discovery and the Highlight City Band.

Along with rock band Vehicle, she recorded for John Driscoll's Skyline label.

== Career ==
In 1971, Silver was part of the National Rock Opera which was formed by Bill Clement and based in Toronto. In addition to her, other performers included Avril Chown, Tabby Johnson, Fred Nicolaidis and Paul Ryan.

In 1978, Silver was vocalist and percussionist with Star City, a band that had evolved out of a group called Funktion. They had the distinction of being the very first Canadian band to be signed by TK Records who had KC & The Sunshine Band, George MacRae, Peter Brown and Foxy on their roster. As of September 1978, Star City consisted of Karen Silver on percussion and vocals, Val Mancuso on guitar and vocals, Jim Rigon on keyboards and vocals, Gilles Maheu on bass and vocals and Joe Rijon on drums. The group had recorded their version of the Spencer Davis Group hit song, "I'm a Man". The single was produced by John Driscoll, assisted by Robert Ouimet at Toronto's Sounds Interchange Studios. As reported in the 23 September issue of RPM Weekly, a deal had been done with TK Records and a disco mix of the single had been rush-released in the US.

On 23 April 1979, Silver appeared at the Harbor Castle Convention Centre in Toronto as the show's featured musical guest. The show called Metamorphosis was a musical fashion show. She performed six songs and modelled fashions whilst accompanied by a number of dancers on a stage set that was described as elaborate. Both her and the event was said to be well received.

=== "Make Me Feel Alright" ===
Working with producer John Driscoll, Silver recorded the single "Make Me Feel Alright" in Montreal. They thought it had some potential so they released it in 12" format to generate some interest in the product. Some copies found their way into the United States and it was being spun in a few discos. One day Bob Feiden of Arista Records rang Driscoll to see what he was up to, and Driscoll informed him that he was working with Silver. Feiden was told go to a local store to pick up a copy of the single. He did that and an hour later he called Driscoll and said that he thought the single was great and asked him when they could sit down and talk. This resulted in Driscoll flying to New York with product by both Silver and a group called The Poppers. Arista would then take on both acts.

By May, her single "Make Me Feel Alright" which was attainable in the US as import was attracting attention. John Driscoll was said to be nearing the completion of a major label deal for the United States. Quality Records were also getting ready to release Silver's debut album which was planned for a release on 1 July. The producers were to be Driscoll and Robert Ouimet.

With the interest and success growing with Silver's disco single "Make Me Feel Alright", it was reported in the 2 June issue of RPM Weekly that Skyline Records had signed an exclusive recording agreement with her. It was reported the following week by RPM Weekly that "Make Me Feel Alright" was causing quite a stir on the West Coast in the US. In the same issue Silver was also pictured with the Mighty Pope, Gaston Graven, John Driscoll, Robert Ouimet and engineer Paul Pachard at Tempo Studio. This is where Silver and the Mighty Pope had had their recordings done.

=== "Hold on I'm Comin'" ===
For the week of 22 September, Silver's single "Hold On I'm Comin' debuted at No. 37 in the Cash Box Top 40 Disco chart. In its sixth charting week, the single peaked at No. 19 for the week of 27 October.

For the week of 22 September, "Hold on I'm Comin" debuted at No. 83 in the RPM Weekly 100 Singles chart, and at No. 40 in the RPM Weekly Adult Oriented Playlist chart.

=== Further activities ===
It was reported in the 9 February 1980 issue of RPM Weekly that Silver with a single and album already behind her was due to have her single "Fake" released that month. The song which was written by Gino Soccio was taken from her previous album. According to the article, some songs for her upcoming were written by members of her band, Discovery. Due to Silver's preference to record in Montreal rather than Toronto, the album was likely to be recorded there. It was also reported that she was to tour Europe in April. Her management company at the time was Starrider. With "Fake" now released, it was at No. 12 on the Montreal Billboard Disco Action chart for the week of 5 April 1980.

In 1980, Silver was nominated for a Juno Award in the Most Promising Female Vocalist of the Year category.

In 1981, her album Set Me Free was released. The single taken from the album, "Set Me Free" / "Love Me Tonight" which was written by Gino Soccio and Bob McDill peaked at No. 9 on the US Dance chart. Another single from the album, " Nobody Else" later peaked at No. 15.

In 1982, Silver was nominated in the Most Promising Female Vocalist of the Year category.

In 1984, Silver's single "I Don't Wanna Fall in Love Again" was released on the Power Records label.
