= Pepper Tree (band) =

Canadian rock band

- Origin: Canada
- Genre: Rock
- Years active: 1967 - 1974
- Label: Capitol
- Past members: Tim Garagan; Tony Argent; Lenny Brennan; Richie Richmond; Bawnie Oulton

Pepper Tree was a Canadian rock band that was formed in 1967. They had chart hits with "Everywhere", "Mr Pride", "You're My People" and "Try".

== Background ==
Pepper Tree came in to being in 1967. The founding members were, Tim Garagan (drums, lead vocals), Lenny Brennan (guitar), Richie Richmond (bass), Tony Argent (guitar, vocals) and Bawnie Oulton (lead vocals). Garagan had been in the group, Friends of the Family. Brennan and Richmond had been in the group Lost Children and Argent had been a member of the Outcasts. At some stage Tony Argent left the band and was replaced by keyboardist Bob Quinn.

In the summer of 1969, a talent scout spotted the band and suggested to them to make a demo recording. As a result of this, they were signed to the Capitol label.

The group's bookings were handled by Halifax-based booking agency, Entertainment Contacts who also handled bookings for Ashley Heavy, Fox and the Universal Power.

== Career ==
=== 1960s ===
The group was doing the rounds of the Atlantic Provinces when they were spotted by Alex Clark, a sales rep for Capitol Records. He made the suggestion to them to record a demo tape which he would get it to Paul White the A&R director for Capitol. It wasn't long before the group recorded their debut single, "Mr Pride". Even though it was a strong single, it didn't make it to the top, but it did establish the group as one to monitor.

=== 1970s ===
It was reported in the 28 March 1970 issue of RPM Weekly that Pepper Tree who had been working with Nimbus 9 producer, Jack Richardson just completed their recording sessions at the RCA Toronto Studios for a release on the Capitol label. The release was to be "Everywhere" which was an original composition. The line up at the time was Doug Billard on vocals, Bob Quinn on organ, Richie Richmond on bass, Len Brennan on lead guitar and Tim Saragon on drums.

==== "Everywhere" / "Mr. Pride" ====
"The single "Everywhere" debuted at No. 40 on the RPM Canadian Content Chart for the week of 25 April. The following week, the chart was re-named as the Top 50 Canadian Content chart. The record had moved up to No. 38.

"Everywhere" debuted at No. 98 in the RPM 100 Singles chart for the week of 23 May 1970.

"Everywhere" peaked at No. 11 on the Top 50 MAPL Canadian Chart for the week of 6 June 1970. It also peaked at No. 75 on the RPM 100 chart that week. The following week, in both the TOP 50 MAPL chart at No. 7 and the RPM 100 chart at No. 51, the song was now "Mr. Pride". For the week of 18 July, "Mr. Pride" was at No. 1 on the Top 50 MAPL Canadian chart. It was also at No. 13 on the RPM 100 Singles chart. For the week of 25 July, the single was still at No. 1. It also reached its peak at No. 12 on the RPM 100 chart.

==== "You're My People" (single) ====
"You're My People" debuted at No. 76 on the RPM 100 Singles chart for the week of 25 September 1971.

==== You're My People (album) ====
The group's album You're My People was produced by Jack Richardson and released on Capitol ST6364-F. It was reviewed in the 25 September issue of RPM Weekly. It was positive with the reviewer writing that the band should have made it a long time ago and referred to them as the Maritime's foremost group. The two songs mentioned were "Try" and "How Many Times" with the latter being called great singles material.

The album You're My People debuted at No. 80 in the RPM 100 Albums chart for the week of 16 October 1971.

==== Further activities ====
In February 1973, the group released the single, "Midnight Lady" / "Teach Me How to Fly".

In the spring of 1973, Tim Garagan and Bob Quinn left the band. There was a final Newfoundland-based line up that was made up of Chris Brockway on bass, Brian "Too Loud" MacLeod on drums, Ralph Parker on keyboards, Paul Butler on guitar. They carried on until their breakup in early 1974.

It was reported in the 18 May 1974 issue of RPM Weekly that Tim Garagan and Bob Quinn had signed a five-year personal management agreement with producer Skip York. Garagan and Quinn had completed a one-week session at Audio Atlantic recording songs that they had composed. The magazine also indicated that a single would be released on 1 June and then a double album would follow. Also that year, Quinn worked on and contributed to the Sail on Nova Scotia album that was released on Solar SAR 3026.

== Later Years ==
Tim Garagan and Bob Quinn would later become members of Bruce Wheaton's group Molly Oliver.
