= Bob Murphy (country rock musician) =

- Died: 24 June 2021
- Genres: Rock, country-rock, rock
- Occupation: Musician
- Instruments: Guitar, keyboards
- Years active: 1960s - ?
- Labels: Broadland, RCA Records, RCA Victor
- Formerly of: The Untouchables, Stitch in Tyme, Soma, Bob Murphy & Big Buffalo

Bob Murphy was a Canadian rock and country musician who had been members of bands such as The Untouchables, Stitch in Tyme, Soma and Bob Murphy & Big Buffalo. He also had chart hits with his band in the 1970s.

== Background ==
From 1963 to 1965 Murphy was a member of the Untouchables, where he was a guitarist and vocalist. He was also a member of other rock groups. It was in the mid 1970s that he turned to country.

He and his group were 1975 Juno Nominees in the Country Group of the Year category. They were also RPM Big Country Award winners in the Outstanding Performer Group category for 1975.

== Career ==
=== 1960s ===
==== The Untouchables ====
Murphy was playing guitar and contributing vocals in group The Untouchables which also included, Grant Fullerton on guitar and vocals, John Yorke on bass and vocals, and Philip Canning on drums.

==== Stitch in Tyme ====
In 1965, Untouchables members Murphy, Fullerton and Yorke merged with members of another group, The Continentals; Donnie Morris and Pinky Dauvin to form the band Golden Earing. The group later changed their name to the Stitch in Tyme. Murphy played keyboards in this ensemble. Jorke left the group in 1966 and was replaced by Bruce Wheaton who had been in the Continentals. The group had chart hits with "Got to Get You into My Life" which got to No. 36 on the RPM 100 chart for the week of 18 March 1967, and "New Dawn", which peaked at No. 36 on the RPM 100 chart for the week of 28 October. and at No. 3 on the RPM Canadian Hits chart for the week of 28 October. The group had another hit on the radio with "Stop Wastin' Time". It got to No. 30 in Fredericton. However, due to legal issues, it was never properly released.

=== 1970s ===
==== Soma ====
After the Stitch in Tyme broke up, Murphy, Bruce Wheaton and Donnie Morris joined the group Soma. The group's formation was actually Murphy's idea. He was also the leader. The name for the group came from a narcotic drink in Aldous Huxley's Brave New World. As mentioned in the 8 May 1971 issue of RPM Weekly, the group was made up of Murphy, Frank McKay, Jack Harris, Donny Muir, Richie Oakley and Donnie Morris. The group was also pictured on the front cover of that issue.

The group's single, "Train" debuted at No. 98 in the RPM 100 Singles chart for the week of 27 March 1971. It peaked at No. 54 for the week of 19 June.

==== "Don't Put the Blame on Me" ====
Murphy wrote the song "Don't Put the Blame on Me", which was recorded by himself and his backing group the Big Buffalo. Backed with his composition, "Save Me", it was released on Broadland BR 2107X in 1974. The single debuted at No. 46 in the RPM Weekly RPM Country Playlist chart for the week of 21 December 1974. At week eleven, for the week of 15 March, the single peaked at No. 25.

==== Further activities ====
On 4 April 1978, Murphy was signed to RCA by Jack Feeney as an artist exclusive to the label as well as a songwriter for Dunbar Publishing which was affiliated with RCA. It was also reported in the 22 April issue of RPM Weekly that RCA was rushing out his first single for the label, a Charlie Russell composition called "Home Folks" backed with "When God Dips His Love in My Heart". His backing musicians at the time were, Vic Mullen on banjo, Stan Winistock on fiddle, and Al Brisco on dobro. With Murphy giving twenty-four tracks to Feeney as a result of the deal, it was speculated that his album to be released in the near future could be a two-record package.

==== "Homefolks" ====
Murphy and his band had "Homefolks" backed with "When God Dips His Love in My Heart" released on RCA Victor in 1978.

The record was nominated for an award in the Country Music Top Single Recording category.

==== "I Just Got Tired of Being Poor" ====
Murphy recorded the songs " Just Got Tired of Bein' Poor" and "I Shoulda Known Better" which appeared as the A side and B sides of 1978 single release, RCA Victor PB-50482. The single debuted at No. 73 in the RPM Country 75 Singles chart for the week of 25 November.

==== "Day After Day" ====
For the week of 24 March 1979, "Day After Day" debuted at No. 72 in the RPM Country 75 Singles chart. For the week of 21 April, the single at week five had moved up from No. 70 to No. 69. By 5 May, it was no longer in the chart.

"Day After Day" had a second debut in the RPM Country 75 Singles chart at No. 75 for the week of 2 June 1979.

== Death ==
Bob Murphy died at his home on 4 June 2021. He was aged 76.
