= Max Bergå =

Swedish talent agent

Max Bergå is a Swedish talent agent and co-founder of Marion Vain.

Bergå has been mentioned by magazines such as V Magazine, King and Rodeo for his contributions to Swedish men's fashion and being part of founding the careers of numerous well-known Swedish models. Among them are Charlie Westerberg, Texas Olsson, Axel Tiderman, Oscar Spendrup och Kristian Åkergren.

In 2013, Max featured in episode 6 of the Swedish reality-series 'Modellpojkar', airing on SVTplay. The show was given the award "Kristallen" for "best reality show 2013".

Since 2010, Bergå is a member of the Post-pop band Everywhere.
