= I Like What I Like (song) =

1972 song by Everyday People

"I Like What I Like" is a song that was originally recorded by the Canadian rock band Everyday People. It eventually became an underground dance hit and has achieved a type of cult status. The song has since been covered by artists such as Hot Line, Cass Elliot, The LTG Exchange and Mr. Creeps.

== Everyday People version ==
"I Like What I Like"

Song by Everyday People

from the album Everyday People
- A-side: "I Like What I Like"
- B-side: "Don't Wait For Tomorrow"
- Released: 1972
- Length: 3:23
- Label: GRT Records 1233-12
- Composer: Bruce Wheaton
- Producer: Terry Brown

Everyday People singles chronology
"Don't Wait for Tomorrow" (1972)	"I Like What I Like" (1972)	"Feelin' Better Already" (1972)

=== Background ===
Everyday People recorded "I Like What I Like" and "Don't Wait for Tomorrow", which were produced by Terry Brown and released in Canada on GRT 1233-12 in March 1972. Bruce Wheaton composed both sides. The song also appeared as the B side to "Experience in Love" which was released in the United States on Paramount PAA-0157 in 1972.

It was reported in the March 4th issue of RPM Weekly that Everyday People were midway through their month-long tour through Eastern Canada and were to make numerous appearances on radio and television and other venues. Also label GRT was currently behind a nation-wide push of the group's new song, "I Like What I Like".

The song eventually became popular in the clubs and earnt itself the status of an underground dance hit and a cult song.

Tom Jones and Three Dog Night had expressed interest in the song in 1973.

=== Reception ===
The single was in the First Time Around section of the Billboard Top Single Picks for the week of 30 June 1973. The reviewer wrote that it was a catchy dance song that was all melody and repeat phraseology. Interestingly Steve Kennedy, not Terry Brown was credited as the producer.

In his 1973 review of the song, Gordon Fletcher of Rolling Stone wrote that it was a completely strange production.

According to Cosmo Baker in 2022, "I Like What I Like" predated the "four on the floor" innovations of Baker, Harris & Young. He also wrote that it was more of the Mancuso / Siano school of "party music" type.

=== Airplay ===
The song was on the playlist of CKXL in Calgary for the week of 4 March 1972. The record was in the Secondary Market section of the 25 March 1972 issue of RPM Weekly. It was on the playlist of CKEN in Kentville.

=== Confusion ===
There was a band from North Jersey, called The Everyday People who recorded for Red Coach Records during the 1970s. A version of "I Like What I Like" song which is included on their CD compilation album which was released on Unidisc SPLK-7160 in 1996. The band performing the song appears to be The Hotline which is related to The Everyday People.

== Hot Line version ==
"I Like What I Like"

45rpm single by The Hot Line
- A-side: "I Like What I Like"
- B-side: "Get Down Get Stank!"
- Released: October 1973
- Label: Red Coach RC 804
- Producers: Sonny Tyler and Freddie Vee; Gene Redd Jr. (exec. prod.)

The Hot Line was an American funk group that was previously known as The Everyday People. Workingh with producers, Sonny Tyler and Freddie Vee, they recorded their version of "I Like What I Like". Backed with "Get Down Get Stank!", it was released on Red Coach RC 804 in October 1973.

=== Airplay ===
As shown in the 17 November 1973 issue of Cash Box, the single had been added to the playlist of radio station WHAT in Philadelphia.

== Other versions ==
Cass Elliot recorded her version of the song which appeared on her 1973 album, Don't Call Me Mama Anymore. According to High Fidelity, Cass Elliot's voice was said to be strong on "I Like What I Like". Even though it was aided by the big band arrangement of producer Jack Daugherty, the song was said to be average. However in a review of her album which was published in the 23 October issue of Cash Box, the reviewer wrote that the songs "The Torch Song Medley" and "I Like What I Like" were beautiful just like Cass.

New York funk band The LTG Exchange recorded a version of the song which was included on their self-titled debut album that was released in 1974.

A version by Mr. Creeps was recorded. A Sea Sheen Production, it was arranged by Pete Jeffries. Backed with the Frank Sheen composition "Good Time Girl", it was released on Private Stock PVT 12 in 1975.
