= Young (band) =

- Origin: Canada
- Genres: Jazz Rock, rock
- Years active: 1970s
- Label: Ampex

Young was a Canadian rock music group from Hamilton, Ontario led by Danny Squire.They released a few singles and an album during the 1970s. They had success with "Goin' to the Country" which was a hit in both Canada and the United States. Their album also spent about 14 weeks in the charts. The group may have been working on a second album prior to their break up.

== Background ==
Their group had a hit with "Goin' to the Country" in both Canada, and the United States where it made it to #30 on the Billboard Hot 100 chart. Two members of the group, Carl Watral and Leon Feigenbaum had been in the Canadian group, Natural Gas.

== History ==
=== 1971 ===
That year, the group released the single, "Goin' To the Country" bw "Grape Farm" on Ampex AC 1301. Produced by John Driscoll, the A side was composed by Bruce Gordon and the B side by Rocco Ferrill. The two songs were the first published by Skyline North, a new publishing company established by Ampex Music.

By May 1, 1971, the single had moved up from #80 to #74 in the RPM100 Chart. By May 29, 1971, the single was at its second week still holding the #37 spot, just behind "Garden of Ursh" by Karen Young.

In August that year, the band was pictured on the front cover of RPM Weekly. At that time the line up consisted of Roger Plomish who replaced the original vocalist Danny Squire (leader, lead singer, trumpet, organ, piano, pedal steel guitar), Mo Prieur (sax, flute, vocals), Mike Sloski (drums, percussion, vocals), Alex MacDougall (lead guitar, banjo, pedal steel guitar, vocals), Brian Kirkwood (bass, vocals, trumpet), John Redmond (keyboard, lead vocals), Paul Olympico (trumpet, flugel horn, vocals), and Danny Elliott (trombone and vocals).

Following on from the success of their previous single, "Goin' to the Country", there was expectation that the new single "The Rain Came Down" bw "We Got Time" would do well. It was given a 75% charting probability.

=== 1972 ===
In August 1972, RPM Weekly wrote that the nine member band had had undertaken a successful tour through Ontario, and were preparing for a Western Canadian tour starting on the 18th of the following month. They were readying their next single for Ampex. At the time they were made up of former members from Truck, Natural Gas, Brass Union and the Tom Jones Las Vegas Review. Ampex's A&R director John Driscoll was hoping to release an album of the band to coincide with their tour.

Album

By early December their album Business had been released. It received a favorable review by RPM Weekly with the reviewer calling it a first rate production and commenting on the vocal strength having increased considerably since their last record. It was referred to as "Big Band Hard Rock" with good commercial appeal, with the best tracks being "Buffalo" and "America". The album entered the RPM100 album chart at #97 for the week of December 30, 1972. By January 20, at its third week, it was at #77. The following week it was still holding at #77. The album was recorded at #85 in the RPM Weekly March 3 issue. By March 10, it was in still charting at #89.

Further activities

=== 1973 ===
By mid-February, the line up had changed. It now consisted of Roger Plomish (lead singer, keyboards, guitar), Bobby Washington (bass guitar and background vocals), Roger Dickin (lead guitar), Joe Bendzsa (drums), Joe Edmonds (trombone, euphonium, flute and background vocals), Mike Hunter (trombone, octa voice, French horn, background vocals and brass arrangements), Carl Waytral (aka Carl Watral) (trumpet, brass arrangements), Tony Mastrull (trumpet, fluegel horn, French horn, head arranger), and Danny Fogel (trumpet, brass arrangements). Bruce Ley who sang lead on the song "Buffalo" was no longer with the group. Tony Booth who both wrote and sang lead on "America" and sang on "Invitation" had also left the band.

By August 1973, the group had come under the management of Jules Rabkin who also managed Robbie G. Griffith. The group's line up at the time consisted of Roger Plomish on lead guitar, keyboards and lead vocal; Jimmy Roberts on tenor sax and flute; Joe Edmonds on trombone, bass and vocals; Mike Hunter on trombone, bass and vocals; Leon Feigenbaum on bass; Joe Bendzsa on drums; Carl Watral on trumpet and flugel horn; Tony Mastrull on trumpet and flugel horn; Dennis Collier on trumpet; and Roger Dickin on lead guitar. An article in the September 1 issue of Billboard that the group was working on their second album with producer John Driscoll. They had recently appeared at the Granny's venue where Rabkin had arranged for several US booking agents to see their show. Also in that early period of September, the group were half-way through a six week engagement at the Marco Polo in Miami, playing to sell out crowds nearly every night. After that engagement finished they were to head off to Mexico and then to Toronto work on their album which John Dee Driscoll would be producing at the RCA studios.

== Discography ==
Singles
Act	Release	Catalogue	Year	Notes
Young	"Goin' to the Country" / "Grape Farm"	Ampex AC-1301	1971	
Young	"The Rain Came Down" / "We Got Time"	Ampex AC-1302	1971	
Young	"Happy Song" / "Don't Push A Man"	Ampex AC-1308	1971	
Young	"Buffalo" / "Goin' Down"	Ampex AC-1312	1971	

Albums
Act	Release	Catalogue	Year	Notes
Young	Business	Ampex A-10151	1971	

== Line ups ==
Line up as of August, 1971

- Alex MacDougall (lead guitar, banjo, pedal steel guitar, vocals)
- Danny Elliott (trombone and vocals)
- Brian Kirkwood (bass, vocals, trumpet)
- Paul Olympico (trumpet, flugel horn, vocals)
- Roger Plomish (leader, lead singer, trumpet, organ, piano, pedal steel guitar)
- Mo Prieur (sax, flute, vocals)
- John Redmond (keyboard, lead vocals)
- Mike Sloski (drums, percussion, vocals)

Line up on 1972 album

- Paul Booth (bass guitar, backing vocals, lead vocals)
- Jim Chivers (drums, percussion)
- Roger Dickin (guitar, backing vocals)
- Jaan Koel (tenor saxophone, soprano saxophone, alto flute, flute)
- Dan Fogel (trumpet)
- Bruce Ley (keyboards, tambourine, backing vocals, lead vocals)
- Tony Mastrull (trumpet)
- Roger Polmish (lead vocals, guitar)
- Carl Watral (trumpet, flugelhorn)

Line up in early 1973

- Joe Bendzsa (drums)
- Roger Dickin (lead guitar)
- Joe Edmonds (trombone, euphonium, flute and background vocals)
- Danny Fogel (trumpet, brass arrangements)
- Mike Hunter (trombone, octa voice, French horn, background vocals and brass arrangements)
- Tony Mastrull (trumpet, fluegel horn, French horn, head arranger)
- Roger Plomish (lead singer, keyboards, guitar)
- Bobby Washington (bass guitar and background vocals)
- Carl Watral aka Cark Waytral (trumpet, brass arrangements)

Line up in August, 1973
under management of Jules Rabkin.

- Joe Bendzsa (drums)
- Dennis Collier (trumpet)
- Roger Dickin (lead guitar)
- Joe Edmonds (trombone, bass, vocals)
- Leon Feigenbaum (bass)
- Mike Hunter (trombone, bass, vocals)
- Tony Mastrull (trumpet, flugel horn)
- Roger Plomish (lead guitar, keyboards, lead vocal)
- Jimmy Roberts (tenor sax, flute)
- Carl Watral on (trumpet, flugel horn)

== Later years ==
James Roberts aka Jimmy Roberts who was a member of Truck would play with artists such as David Benoit, R&B singer Derek Bordeaux, Rick Braun, The Eurythmics, Randy Jacobs, Etta James, Greg Karukas, Pianist Rob Mullins, Sade, Rod Stewart, Carly Simon. Later, with the help of his old friend William "Smitty" Smith, he became one of the stock session musicians in L. A. and became a sought after player. He also had released some solo recordings.

== Links ==
- Discogs: Young
