= Donald Whitton =

- Whitton, furthest to the right, recording at the Canadian Broadcasting Centre, Toronto, 1964.

Background information
- Born: Donald Richard Whitton; August 2, 1923; London, Ontario, Canada
- Died: April 26, 2018 (aged 94) Ottawa, Ontario, Canada
- Genres: Classical, jazz, rock
- Occupations: Cellist, teacher
- Instruments: Violoncello, Viola da Gamba
- Years active: 1941–2018
- Formerly of: National Arts Center Orchestra, Toronto Symphony Orchestra, Lighthouse, CBC Radio Orchestra

Donald Richard "Don" Whitton (August 2, 1923 – April 26, 2018) was a Canadian concert cellist, recording musician, and teacher, with a professional career in music spanning over 50 years.

== Biography ==
Whitton was born in London, Ontario, Canada in August 1923. From a young age, he showed an aptitude for music, studying piano and cello. He continued to study until World War II was declared. Like many other young Canadians, he enlisted, joining the 4th Royal Canadian Field Artillery Regiment (4RCA). Stationed in England until shortly after the D-Day invasion, Whitton and his unit joined the extremely heavy fighting during the Caen/Falaise battles in Normandy. As part of the 2nd Infantry Division, 2nd Canadian Corps, 4RCA suffered heavy casualties in the terrible battles of Normandy, Belgium, the Netherlands (Woensdrecht), and the Rhineland (Hochwald). In addition, it was the target of the first-ever bombing attack by a jet plane (an Me 262). With 4RCA, Whitton operated in the dangerous role of forwarding observation signaler, which placed him on the front line with the infantry. Casualty rates among artillery observation teams were very high, but he survived the long odds to see VE day. With the fighting over in Europe, he decided to answer an audition call for forces musicians. Playing on a borrowed instrument, he was successful, even though he'd been unable to practice since the start of the war. He was transferred to an entertainment unit in England where he spent the next year as a cellist with a forces orchestra. On his return home, he decided to take a music degree from the University of Toronto.

Cornelius Ysselstyn, a famed Canadian cellist at the time, accepted Donald as a student. Donald once again showed great promise. He went on in the next five years to study with many great cellists, including the genius cellist-editor Leonard Rose.

The National Arts Center, in Ottawa, home of the National Arts Center Orchestra

Whitton auditioned for the Toronto Symphony Orchestra (TSO) in 1948, and was awarded the position of principal's assistant the following year. While in Toronto he also joined the CBC Radio Orchestra, and several other small music groups. In 1960 Donald quit the TSO, but remained in the CBC radio orchestra. For the next eight years Whitton remained in Toronto, recording with various artists, and playing in dozens of chamber groups, as well as joining the group Lighthouse. In 1970 Donald heard about the newly created National Arts Centre Orchestra, in Ottawa, Ontario, Canada, and that it was in need of musicians. Donald, without hesitation, left both Lighthouse, and the CBC radio orchestra to audition for the NACO, 450 km north-east of Toronto to Ottawa. He landed the top spot as the founding principal cellist of the NACO. During this period Donald took up teaching, and taught some of Canada's current cellists, the most notable of these being; Julian Armour, and Jan Järvlepp. In 1984 he was a tone judge for the Violin society of America's international competition. After retiring from the NACO, in 1994, he continued to teach, and contribute to the Ottawa arts scene. He died in Ottawa in April 2018 at the age of 94.

A CBC reviewer of the performing arts wrote about Whitton:

Solo cello, Don Whitton, captured the tone, nuance and expressive beauty of the Andante’s opening theme with skill and artistry that solidifies his prime years leading the cellos of the National Arts Centre Orchestra.

- James Wegg

== Lighthouse ==
From 1968 to October 1970, Whitton performed with the Canadian rock group Lighthouse, alongside fellow Canadian Howard Shore in the string/brass section. He was one of the original members of the group, but when he had to leave for Ottawa to continue his classical music career, he had to leave Lighthouse as well. Lighthouse was one of the last non-classical music groups he was involved with. Paul Hoffert, the co-founder of Lighthouse, who had the idea for the string/brass section, was disappointed that Don had to leave.

Because of the high calibre of a lot of our people and their great demand, there was a tendency to have personnel changes. Our original cellist, Don Whitton, is now principal cellist with the National Arts Orchestra, and Freddy Stone, one of the trumpeters on our first album, is now playing lead trumpet with Duke Ellington. So it's kind of sad when you lose great musicians like them, but you move on.

- Paul Hoffert

== Playing style ==
Whitton was known for his diversity of styles of playing. He could easily switch from classical to baroque, and many other styles, even including rock and jazz. He was an excellent ripieno musician, but also had the skill of a virtuoso for solo performances. He led his section with direction, and was a strong leader. He is particularly noted for the magnificence of his large, rich, and beautiful tone quality.

== Recording and radio ==
=== Recording ===
Whitton frequented the recording studio with various artists, both classical, and non-classical. He compiled 7 jazz recordings between 1967 and 1969, with various artists. He recorded with Glenn Gould, on his version of several Bach Brandenburg concertos. In 1973 he played with the Ron Collier orchestra on Duke Ellington's album "Collages". Whitton was also the member of several music groups which recorded music including: The Jack Groob Trio and the Jack Groob String Quartet, the Toronto Baroque Ensemble (1958–1963), and the Pack Quartet.

=== Radio ===
During Donald's tenure in both of his major orchestras; the National Arts Centre Orchestra, and the Toronto Symphony Orchestra, he was being broadcast nationwide on a regular basis. Also while he was a member of the CBC Radio Orchestra, he would perform on radio weekly. He would also occasionally perform for a radio jingle.

== See also ==
- National Arts Center Orchestra
- CBC Radio Orchestra
- Toronto Symphony Orchestra
- Leonard Rose
- Lighthouse
