= Madcats =

Canadian rock band (1977–1981)

- Genre: Rock music
- Years active: 1977 - 1981
- Labels: Skyline, Freedom, Buddah
- Spinoffs: The Grant Fullerton Band
- Spinoff of: Fullerton Dam
- Past members: Grant Fullerton; Brad MacDonald; John Erdman; Glen Gratto; Bobby Blake

Madcats were a Canadian rock band active in the late 1970s and early 1980s. They had chart success with their debut album.

== Background ==
The history of the Madcats can be traced back to the breakup of the group Fullerton Dam when two of its members, Grant Fullerton and Brad MacDonald formed a new group in 1977 which was Madcats. Madcats leader Fullerton had also been frontman for the group, Stytch in Time. He had been a member of Lighthouse, playing on the first two albums.

In addition to Fullerton, the other front man was Bobby Blake.

Their debut album was released on the Skyline label. According to the September–October, 1978 issue of Music Scene, the songs, "Freewheeling", "Teenage Valentino", "She’s Got It", and "Woman’s Got the Power Over Me" established the group as an up-and-coming attraction. And radio exposure gave them the push to tour most of Canada. At the time, the line up was Grant Fullerton on guitar and vocals, Brad MacDonald on keyboards and vocals, John Erdman on bass, Glen Gratto on drums and vocals and Bobby Blake on lead vocals. Glen Gratto had been a member of The Kidds which included member, Paul Langlois, and were managed by Jack Nestor Jr. They recorded the 1967 single, "Children In Love" / "You Were Wrong". He was also a member of early '70s band Bullrush and had played with Frank Soda.

== Career ==
=== 1970s ===
==== Debut album ====
The group's self-titled album was released on Skyline SKY 10166 in 1978. It was produced by John Driscoll. It had a positive review in the 4 March issue of RPM Weekly with the reviewer calling it "Top fare for the AOR crowd".

The self-titled album debuted at No. 100 in the RPM 100 Albums chart for the week of 15 April. It would eventually peak at No. 47 for the week of 24 June.

It was reported in the 27 May 1978 issue of RPM Weekly that a major promotional campaign for the group by Quality Records was underway. The campaign which was called "Madcats Go Gold" involved a special limited edition of the group's album which had the disc on gold colored vinyl. At the start of the campaign, the album sales were at 6000. But when the campaign was reported on in the 9 May issue, the sales had quadrupled.

The album designers Alan Gee and Greg Lawson would win a Juno Award in 1979, in the Best Graphics category.

The US release of album wouldn't be reviewed by Walrus until 1979. It was previously only available in the United States as an import, but was now available there that year on Buddah SOS 5718. It was reviewed in the 23 April 1979 issue of the magazine. It had been previously reviewed as an import. In this issue the reviewer noted the strong voices of Grant Fullerton and Bobby Blake. However the arranging was said to be standard rock and Fullerton's lyric writing needed work, but there was still potential with the album.

==== Further activities ====
It was reported in the 18 March 1978 issue of RPM Weekly that Madcats had released their debut single from their album on the Skyline label. The single "Too Late for Love" bw "Take All the Love" was produced by John Dee Driscoll. Both sides were written by Grant Fullerton. It was also an RPM Rock Pick for that week. They had also completed a promotional tour in support of the album that included appearances in Montreal and Toronto. The launch of the album was tied in with their five-day appearance from 22 to 26 February at the El Casino in Montreal. They had also guested on the CFCF-TV show, Feel Like Dancing. The album had been picked up for airplay at CHUM-FM and Q107 in Toronto, CKOI and CHOM in Montreal and CHED in Edmonton. It was also reported that the album was selling well and John Driscoll the A&R and national promotion director for Quality Records had confidence in its success.

On 4 April 1978, they opened for Rush at the War Memorial Auditorium in Rochester, New York and played to 13,000 people. The group was well received. In the audience were people from radio stations, WMJID, WCMR and WSAY.

Following the success of their album, the group was scheduled to tour Ontario and Western Canada in May and June. Quality Records were also running a campaign for them.

The single "We Can Get the Feelin'" backed with "Freewheelin'" was released on Skyline SKY-10166. The songs on both sides were composed by Grant Fullerton. It was an RPM Weekly Rock-Oriented Pick for the week of 17 June.

By late 1979, the group were feeling the effects of competition and club owners opting for the week-to-week booking format, trying disco one week and then new wave the next and waiting until the last minute to make up their minds with what they wanted.

=== 1980s ===
By July 1980, bassist Charlie Towers had joined the band. The rest of the lineup was Grant Fullerton and Bobby Blake on guitars and vocals, Brad MacDonald on keyboards and Glen Gratto on drums. They were to record an album at Phase One Studios in Toronto and would work with veteran producer Jack Richardson. Their signing to Quality Records in a worldwide contract was reported in the 5 July 1980 issue of RPM Weekly. The issue also reported that they were to release their version of the Lovin' Spoonful song "Summer in the City" on 1 July.

It was reported in the 7 November 1981 issue of RPM Weekly that there were major changes happening within the band. According to group manager Frank Daller, rhythm guitarist Bobby Blake had left the group. Bassist Clarence Greer and drummer Glen Gratto were gone too. Two new members had come into the group. They were drummer Rob Blacker who had been with Hellfield and bass guitarist Steve Campbell who had been with Wednesday. Blacker had taken the place of Glen Gratto. However, Gary McCracken from Max Webster had been a temporary drummer in between Gratto and Blacker. Greer had left to join the group Zon and Steve Campbell had taken his place. The two founding members guitarist Grant Fullerton and keyboardist Brad MacDonald were still there to ground the group. Their album Streetgame on the Freedom label which label included the single " Calling It Quits" was expected to have Japanese and South African releases. There was also to be a new session for an album that would see a release in late fall.

==== New name and direction ====
It was reported in the 28 November 1981 issue of RPM Weekly that the group had changed their name to the Grant Fullerton Band. The group's manager William Tenn said that it was really a new band that had been formed from the remnants of the previous band. Madcats members Glen Gratto and Clarence Greer had been replaced with Rob Blacker and Steve Campbell. According to Tenn, the band had run out of steam, were ready to "throw in the towel" and the last album hadn't done well plus they couldn't get bookings. The group had a new image and were heading in a direction of straight-ahead rock. With more energy in the band, they now had bookings for the rest of the year. They had released a new single, "Let Her Go" on the Freedom label as well as a four-track 12" EP called Killers.

== Later years ==
Glen Gratto died on 31 August 2021.

== Members ==
- Grant Fullerton - guitar, lead vocals
- Brad MacDonald - keyboards and vocals
- John Erdman - bass
- Glen Gratto - drums and lead vocals
- Bobby Blake - guitar, lead vocals

== Discography ==
=== Singles ===
- Madcats - "Too Late for Love" / "Take All the Love" - Skyline SKY 019X - 1978
- Madcats - "We Can Get the Feelin'" / "Freewheelin" - Skyline SKY 020X - 1978
- Madcats - "Woman's Got the Power Over Me" / "I'm Not a Free Man" - Skyline SKY 023X - 1979
- Madcats - "Summer in the City" / "I Like It" - Quality Q 2377X - 1980
- Madcats - "Call It Quits" / "Young Man's World" - Freedom FR-45-008 - 1981

- Grant Fullerton Band - "Let Her Go" / "Let Her Go" - Freedom Records Inc. FR-DJ-45-1 - 1981
- Grant Fullerton Band – "Fear in the Night" / "Fear in the Night" - Freedom Records Inc. FR-DJ-45-2 - 1981

=== EPs ===
- Grant Fullerton Band – Killers! - Freedom Records Inc. FR-EP-001 - 1981
  A. "My Mind and My Music", "Where Do I Fit In
  B. "Let Her Go", "Fear in the Night"

=== Albums ===
- Madcats - Madcats - Skyline SKY 10166 - 1978
- Madcats - Streetgame - Freedom Records Inc. FR-004 1981
