= Everyday People (Canadian band) =

Canadian rock band

- Origin: Nova Scotia, Canada
- Genres: Rock
- Years active: 1970s
- Labels: GRT, Paramount
- Spinoffs: Molly Oliver
- Past members: Bruce Wheaton; Carson Richards; Pamela Marsh; Chris Papputts; David Hare; Alan Muggeridge

Everyday People, not to be confused with an American band of a similar name was a Canadian rock band that was led by Bruce Wheaton. They were active in the early 1970s, and made the charts a few times during that period.

== Background ==
The band was formed by Bruce Wheaton who had been with the bands Stitch in Tyme and Soma. It was made up of Wheaton on lead vocals and lead guitar, Carson Richards on bass and vocals, Pamela Marsh on keyboards and vocals, Chris Papputts on keyboards and vocals, David Hare on keyboards and Alan Muggeridge on drums. The band's name came from the "Everyday People" song by Sly & the Family Stone.

Along with Dr. Music, Everyday People were one of GRT Records' key acts.

== Career ==
=== "You Make Me Wonder" ===
The group recorded "You Make Me Wonder" which was written by Bruce Wheaton. Backed with "Nova Scotia Home Blues", which Wheaton co-wrote with Pamela Marsh, it was released on GRT 1233-01. The release was noted in the 12 November 1970 issue of RPM Weekly. The group were also an RPM Weekly front-page feature for that week.

"Nova Scotia Home Blues" debuted at No. 27 on the RPM MOR Playlist chart for the week of 12 December.

"You Make Me Wonder" debuted at No. 75 on the RPM 100 Singles chart for the week of 19 December 1970. It peaked at No. 60 for the week of 9 January 1970.

It was noted in the 30 January 1971 issue of RPM Weekly that "You Make Me Wonder" had not been getting major radio station airplay in the Toronto area. However, it was still doing well in all of the markets. The record had moved down from 73 to 85 on the RPM 100 Singles chart that week.

=== "I Get that Feeling" ===
The group recorded the Bruce Wheaton / Pamela Marsh composition, "I Get That Feeling" which was backed with "Experience in Love" and released on GRT 1233-05 in early June 1971. The reviewer wrote that there was great instrumental backing and the group had a lot of voice charm. It was given a chart probability factor of - 62%. The single was seeing regional action and debuted at No. 99 in the RPM 100 Singles chart for the week of 12 June. It peaked at No. 92 for the week of 26 June.

=== Further activities ===
I was reported in the January–February issue of Music Scene that Everyday People had recently completed recordings for the debut album at the Toronto Sound studio. Their new single, a Bruce Wheaton composition was "Don't Wait for Tomorrow". It was backed with the Sylvester Stewart composition, "Everyday People".

The group's album was reviewed in the February 19th issue of RPM Weekly. The reviewer wrote that it had a good selection of material and was high paced and should pay off in sales. The reviewer also wrote that every cut should receive airplay and "Don't Wait for Tomorrow" should be heard. It was also reported in the same issue that a party had been thrown at the Gasworks for the launch of their album on 26 January. Also, the group's bookings arrangements were being handled by Roscoe Productions and the group had embarked on their most comprehensive tour which started on February 2nd.

It was reported in the March 4th issue of RPM Weekly that Everyday People were midway through their month-long tour through Eastern Canada and were to make numerous appearances on radio and television and other venues. Also label GRT was currently behind a nation-wide push of the group's new song, "I Like What I Like". The song was also on the playlist of CKXL in Calgary.

=== "Feeling Better Already" ===
With the group's single "Feelin' Better Already" being a recent maple Leaf System winner, the group embarked on their tour in early August, appearing at the Generator in Toronto, the Toronto Fair, MacMaster University in Hamilton, and the Genosha Hotel in Oshawa. It was also reported in the 2 September issue of RPM Weekly that they had ahead of them, appearances at The Penthouse Motor Hotel in West Hill (11 to 16 September), Thistletown Collegiate, Rexdale (22 September), The Coal Bin in Toronto (25 September to October 7), Picadilly Tube in Toronto (9-21 September), and the Gasworks in Toronto (23 October to 4 November).

"Feeling Better Already" peaked at No. 37 on the RPM 100 Singles chart for the week of 16 September.

=== "To-Day I Feel Like Being Happy" ===
Everyday People recorded the Bruce Wheaton composed songs "To-Day I feel Like Being Happy" and "Music Man" which were produced by Terry Brown. They were the A & B sides of the single, GRT 1233-16, announced in the 10 February 1973 issue of RPM Weekly. For the week of 31 March, "To-Day I feel Like Being Happy" debuted at No. 97 on the RPM Weekly Adult Contemporary Playlist chart. It was also a Breakout at CIKL, CJTT in Kirkland Lake. The following week, it moved up from No. 97 to No. 93 on the RPM Weekly Adult Contemporary Playlist chart. On 16 June, the single peaked at No. 31.

== Breakup and following years ==
The group broke up in 1974. Bruce Wheaton and Carson Richards formed the Halifax group Molly Olver. The released the self-titled album in 1979. The album had a fourteen-week run in the RPM 100 Albums chart, and at week-eight it was at No. 77.No. 77.

Pam Marsh would go on to work with the band Crowbar, and lend her backing vocals for artists such as April Wine and Rick James.

Guitarist Chris Paputts would later become Chris Hate and a member of the punk group, The Viletones.

In 2001, Pam Marsh released her Dream Come True CD album.

== Members ==
- Bruce Wheaton - Lead vocals, lead guitar
- Carson Richards - bass, vocals
- Pamela Marsh - keyboards, vocals
- Chris Papputts - guitar, vocals
- David Hare - keyboards
- Alan Muggeridge - drums

== Discography ==
=== Singles ===
- "You Make Me Wonder" / "Nova Scotia Home Blues" - GRT - 1970
- "I Get That Feeling" /"Experience of Love" - GRT - 1971
- "Don't Wait for Tomorrow" / "Everyday People" - GRT - 1971
- "I Like What I Like" /" Don't Wait for Tomorrow" - GRT - 1972
- "I Like What I Like" (Part 1)/ "I Like What I Like" (Part 2) (Paramount / GRT)
- "Feelin' Better Already - GRT - 1972
- "Today I Feel Like Being Happy" / "Music Man" - GRT - 1972

=== Albums ===
- Everyday People, GRT 9233-1002 - 1971
