= You Make Me Wonder =

Song

from the album Everyday People
- A-side: "You Make Me Wonder"
- B-side: "Nova Scotia Home Blues"
- Released: 1970
- Length: 3:27
- Label: GRT 1233-01
- Composer: Bruce Wheaton
- Producers: Terry Brown & Doug Riley

singles chronology
"You Make Me Wonder" (1970)	"I Get That Feeling" (1971)

"You Make Me Wonder" is a 1970 single by Canadian rock band Everyday People. The A side registered on the RPM 100 Singles chart, and the B side registered on the RPM MOR Singles chart that year.

== Background ==
"You Make Me Wonder" was written by Bruce Wheaton. The group recorded the song. It was backed with "Nova Scotia Home Blues" which Wheaton co-wrote with Pamela Marsh, and released on GRT 1233-01 in 1970. The release was noted in the 12 November 1970 issue of RPM Weekly. The group were also an RPM Weekly front page feature for that week.

"You Make Me Wonder" had not been getting major radio station airplay in the Toronto area. However, as noted in the 30 January 1971 issue of RPM Weekly, it was still doing well in all of the markets.

== Reception ==
The Maple Leaf System vote results were published in the 26 December 1970 issue of RPM Weekly. No. 1 was "Band Bandit" by Tundra at 6.1, No. 2 was "You Make Me Wonder" by Everyday People at 5.8, No. 3 was "Rocking Chair Ride" by Christopher Kearney at 4.2, No. 4 was "Sally Bumper" by Houston at 3, No. 5 was "Fighting Today" by Meadow at 3, No. 6 was "Girl in Green" by Good Grief at 2.5 and No. 7 was "Kelly" by Alan Mobert at 1.9.

== Charts ==
=== Side A ===
"You Make Me Wonder" debuted at No. 75 on the RPM 100 Singles chart for the week of 19 December 1970. It peaked at No. 60 for the week of 9 January 1971.

=== Side B ===
The B side, "Nova Scotia Home Blues" debuted at No. 27 on the RPM MOR Playlist chart for the week of 12 December. It peaked at No. 20 for the week of 19 December. It held that position until 9 January 1971.
