= Molly Oliver =

Canadian rock group

- Origin: Halifax
- Genres: Rock
- Years active: 1979 - 1987
- Label: London Records
- Spinoff of: Everyday People
- Past members: Bruce Wheaton; Carson Richards; Tim Garagan; Bob Quinn; Mike Leggat

Molly Oliver was a Canadian rock group that was formed and fronted by Bruce Wheaton. They had a chart hit with "You Didn't Listen to Me" in 1979.

== Background ==
After the group Everyday People broke up, Bruce Wheaton and bassist Carson Richards who was a fellow member went on to create the group Molly Oliver. Tim Garagan and Bob Quinn had been members of the rock group Pepper Tree.

The group was described by Guy Lepage of the Ottawa Citizen as having the guitar skills of Jimmy Page, the keyboard expertise of Keith Emerson and the vocal arrangements of Crosby, Stills, Nash and Young.

The name for the group is apparently from two dogs that lived near where the band rehearsed.

== Career ==
=== 1970s ===
It was reported in the 17 February 1979 issue of RPM Weekly that Molly Oliver had been signed to an exclusive world-wide contract with London Records of Canada. Gary Chalmers of the label's A&R Office said that they were in preparation to engage in the largest launching campaign that they had undertaken on a Canadian group. Present at the signing of the group were, Alice Koury the vice-president of the label and Ron Scribner of Music Shoppe, the group's agency.

As reported by Guy Lepage in the 3 March issue of the Ottawa Citizen, the group was appearing at the Black Swan. They had been playing since the beginning of the month.

A review of the band's performance at the Moustache Club was published in the 15 March issue of The McGill Daily. Even though the reviewers Mark Butler and S. Peter Loshin found them to be polished and their individual musicianship quite capable, the echo effects the band employed sounded like they were in a wind-tunnel. They also found their covering of other artists material lackluster. However, the response by the patrons in the club which was at near capacity was enthusiastic.

It was reported in the 31 March issue of RPM Weekly, earlier that month, a press party for the band was held in downtown Toronto. Their album had been released about a month prior and had been getting a considerable amount of airplay.

==== Album ====
The group's self-titled album had made its debut at No. 100 in the RPM 100 Albums chart for the week of 10 March. For the week of 28 April, the record was at No. 77 in its eighth charting week. At week fourteen the album was still in the chart at No. 96.

=== "You Didn't Listen to Me" ===
Bruce Wheaton wrote the song "You Didn't Listen to Me", which the band recorded. Backed with "Open Up", it was released on London LX 2681. It debuted at No. 97 in the RPM 100 Singles chart for the week of 17 March. For the week of 5 May, and in its seventh charting week, the single was at No. 72. It was still at No. 72 the following week.

==== Further activities ====
It was reported in the 12 May 1979 issue of RPM Weekly that former Music Shoppe International partner, Bruce Hudson had formed his own agency, The Hudson Agency, which was located at 5467 Spring Garden Road, Halifax. Artists to be represented by the agency were, Maritime acts; Titan, Taquila and Molly Oliver. The agency was also in the process of organizing cross-country tours for Molly Oliver and Titan.

=== 1980s ===
==== "Somebody New in My Eyes" ====
The group released the single, "Somebody New in My Eyes" bw "Hey There" on London LX 2681. As shown in the 23 February 1980 issue of RPM Weekly, the song was playlisted at CFTJ in Cambridge. The following week, it was playlisted at stations, CJCJ in Woodstock, and CKIQ in Kelowna. As shown in the 8 March issue of RPM Weekly, "Somebody New in My Eyes" was one of the playlisted Cancon singles. It was also at No. 48 on the play chart at CKBW in Bridgewater. It was still on the CFCN Cancon singles playlist as shown in the 15 March issue of RPM Weekly.

=== Further activities ===
An Eastern Alliance Records compilation featuring Molly Oliver, Oakley, The Minglewood Band, Dutch Mason, Titan, Sam Moon, the Battery, Spice, and Ram was released around September 1982.

Following lineup changes, the group released an EP in 1982.

The group broke up in 1987.

== Members ==
=== Original line up ===
- Bruce Wheaton - lead vocals, guitar
- Carson Richards - bass, vocals
- Tim Garagan - drums, vocals
- Bob Quinn - keyboards, vocals

=== Member list ===
- Bruce Wheaton - lead vocals, guitar
- Bob Quinn - keyboards, vocals
- Carson Richards - bass, vocals
- Bob Biggs- (drums)
- Tim Garagan - drums, vocals
- Ken "Dutch" Schultz - drums (replaced Garagan)
- Tony Quinn - guitar, vocals (added)
- Mike Leggat - keyboards, vocals (replaced B. Quinn)
- Larry Maillet - guitar, harmonica, vocals (replaced T. Quinn)
- Ian MacMillan - drums (replaced Schultz)
- Peter Jackson - keyboards, vocals (replaced Leggat)
- Don Rodgers - keyboards, vocals (replaced Jackson 1984–86)
- Terry Hopkins - drums (replaced MacMillan)
- Mike Gaudet - bass (replaced Richards)
- Ian MacDougall - bass (replaced Gaudet)
- Neil Robertson - drums (replaced Hopkins)

=== Reunion Line-up 1999-2000 ===
- Bruce Wheaton - guitar, lead vocals
- Larry Maillet - guitar, harmonica, vocals
- Mike Gaudet - bass
- Andre Leblanc - keyboards
- Doug MacKay - drums
- Donnie Morris
- Robin Chapman

== Later years ==
The band reformed in 1999. The members were, Wheaton, Larry Maillet, Mike Gaudet, Andre Leblanc, and Doug MacKay who had been with the band Oakley.
