= Mr. Pride =

Song by The Pepper Tree
- A-side: "Everywhere"
- B-side: "Mr. Pride"
- Released: 1970
- Studio: RCA Studios, Toronto
- Length: 2:50
- Composer: Billard/ Quinn/ Richmond/ Brennan/ Garagan
- Producer: Jack Richardson

Canada chronology
"Mr. Pride" (1970)	"Shine Light Shine" (1971)

"Mr. Pride" is a 1970 song by Canadian rock group, The Pepper Tree. It was the B side of the single. It registered on the RPM 100 Singles chart that year, making the Top Twenty. The A side "Everywhere" also charted.

== Background ==
Pepper Tree had the single, "Everywhere" / "Mr. Pride" released on Capitol 72612 in 1970. The sessions were produced by Jack Richardson of Nimbus 9 at the RCA studios in Toronto. The executive producer was Paul White.

== Reception ==
The single "Everywhere" had been picked up almost straight away. However, some disk jockeys had a preference for the B side, "Mr Pride" which also became a Maple Leaf System pick. By July 1970, the song had become a national favorite.

== Charts ==
=== MAPL Top 50 chart ===
The chart run began with "Everywhere" making its debut at No. 40 on the RPM Canadian Content Chart for the week of 25 April. The following week, the chart was re-named as the Top 50 Canadian Content chart, and the record had moved up to No. 38. "Everywhere" peaked at No. 11 on the Top 50 MAPL Canadian Chart for the week of 6 June 1970. The following week, in the TOP 50 MAPL chart at No. 7, the song in its place was now "Mr. Pride". For the week of 18 July, "Mr. Pride" was at No. 1 on the Top 50 MAPL Canadian chart. For the week of 25 July, the single was still at No. 1. For the week of 29 August, the single was still in the chart at No. 34.

=== RPM 100 Singles ===
The RPM 100 run began with "Everywhere" debuting at No. 98 in the RPM 100 Singles chart for the week of 23 May 1970. For the week of 6 June, it peaked at No. 75. The following week (13 June), in its place was "Mr. Pride" at No. 51. "Mr. Pride" reached its peak at No. 12 on the RPM 100 chart for the week of 23 July.

== Musicians ==
- Tim Garagan, drums, vocals
- Len Brennan, lead guitar
- Bob Quinn, organ
- Robert Richmond aka Richie Richmond, bass
- Doug Billard, lead singer
