= Pinky Dauvin =

- Also known as: Pinky
- Born: Victor Roy Dauvin; 15 January 1946; Sackville, New Brunswick, Canada
- Died: 21 April 2013 (aged 67) New Market, Ontario, Canada
- Genre: Rock
- Instruments: Drums, percussion, vocals
- Label: United Artists
- Formerly of: The Continentals, The Stitch in Tyme, Lighthouse, Mudflat, The Pinky Dauvin Group

Pinky Dauvin born Victor Dauvin was a Canadian singer and percussionist who was a member of Stitch in Tyme, Lighthouse and Mudflat. He also had chart hits of his own in Canada.

== Background ==
Dauvin was born Victor Roy Dauvin in Sackville, New Brunswick on 15 January 1946. Having been vocalist and drummer in The Stitch in Tyme and lead vocalist for Lighthouse, he went solo and was signed to United Artists and became the first Canadian act to do so. He had success with his singles, "Tell Me Who", "Don't Send Someone", "Cheatin' Mistreatin" and "I'll Always Love You".

== Career ==
During the mid 1960s, Dauvin was a member of the group The Continentals. Both he and Donnie Morris from the band merged with Untouchables members, Grant Fullerton, Bob Murphy on guitar and John Yorke to form The Golden Earing. relocating to Toronto, they signed a record deal with Arc and then changed their name to Stitch in Tyme. Bill Gilliland of the Arc label was their manager. They went on to have hits with "Got to Get You into My Life" and "New Dawn".

It was reported in the 24 March 1969 issue of RPM Weekly that both Dauvin and Grant Fullerton had joined Lighthouse. Dauvin who was known as one of the best drummers around was putting away his drumsticks and taking on the role as lead vocalist for the band.

=== "Tell Me Who" ===
With the magazine misprinting the month date as April 20, "Tell Me Who" debuted at No. 92 in the RPM 100 Singles chart for the week of 20 May.

Dauvin was pictured on the front cover of the 27 May issue of RPM Weekly. As mentioned in that issue, in spite of being known as the lead singer of Lighthouse, he was unknown as a solo artist. His single had a big boost with Allan Mathews, the national promotion manager of United Artists running the promotion drive. This resulted in the single being playlisted at CKLW in Windsor. It tied in with the single's release in the United States. The record was also submitted to the Maple Leaf System for evaluation. Earlier that month, Dauvin had flown to Montreal to be on a taped TV show.

It was reported in the 3 June issue of RPM Weekly that the Maple Leaf System Winner for that week was "Tell Me Who".

With the strong progress throughout Canada the single was making, United Artists had scheduled a German release of it for July. It peaked at No. 42 on the RPM 100 Singles chart for the week of 1 July 1972. It was reported in the 8 July issue of RPM Weekly that United Artists who were still feeling good over the response of their first Canadian single "Tell Me Who" had followed it up with a single by "Claudia Valade".

=== Further activities ===
By April 1973, Dauvin had changed his release and performing name to the Pinky Dauvin Group.

=== "I'll Always Love You" ===
Working with producer Andrew A. Melzer at Toronto Sound, Pinky Dauvin recorded the Craig Ruhnke composition "I'll Always Love You". Backed with "Long Gone", it was credited to The Pinky Dauvin Group and released on United Artists UAXW-235-W around April 1973. By early June it was on the playlist of CFRN in Edmonton. The single debuted at No. 97 in the RPM Weekly Adult Contemporary Playlist chart for the week of 23 June.

== Discography ==
=== Singles ===
- "Tell Me Who" / "Call Me If You Want Me" - United Artists UA-50909 - 1972
- "Don't Send Someone" / "Susie" - United Artists - UA-50944 - 1972
- "Cheatin' Mistreatin'" / "Downtown Feelin'" - United Artists - UA-50986 - 1972
- "I'll Always Love You" / "Long Gone" - United Artists - UAXW-235Y - 1973 (The Pinky Dauvin Group)

=== Album ===
- Pinky - United Artists

=== Appears on ===
- Can’t Stop Dancin' - Cachet/Tee Vee CA-1013 - 1974
