= Feelin' Better Already =

Song by Everyday People
- A-side: "Feelin' Better Already"
- B-side: "Music Man"
- Released: 1972
- Label: GRT 1233-14
- Songwriter: Bruce Wheaton
- Producers: Terry Brown, Dr. Music Prod.

Canada chronology
| "I Like What I Like" (1972) | "Feelin' Better Already" (1972) | "To-Day I Feel Like Being Happy" (1972) |

"Feelin' Better Already" is a 1972 single by the Canadian band Everyday People. It made both the RPM 100 and MAPL 30 charts that year.

== Background ==
"Fellin Better Already" was written by Bruce Wheaton. It was recorded at Toronto Sound Studios. Backed with "Music Man", it was released on GRT 1233-14-T in 1972. The single's release was recorded in the 15 July issue of RPM Weekly.

In early August, the group went on tour.

The song was also a winner of the Maple Leaf System vote.

== Reception ==
As reported in the 12 August issue of RPM Weekly, "Feelin' Better Already" was the Maple Leaf System winner for that week. This now gave it two weeks play on each of the Maple Leaf Member radio stations.

== Airplay ==
For the week of 15 July, the record was a Breakout at CKBC in Bathurst, and at CHEC in Lethbridge. It was also enjoying a strong response at CHNL.

For the week of 22 July, John Oliver of CHEC said that the song was going well. It was also a Breakout there.

== Charts ==
"Feelin' Better Already" debuted at No. 98 in the RPM 100 Singles chart for the week of 22 July. It debuted at No. 9 in the RPM Top 30 MAPL Chart for the week of 19 August.

The single peaked at No. 6 on the RPM Top 30 MAPL chart for the week of 9 September. It also peaked at No. 37 on the RPM 100 Singles chart that week.

The single was still in the MAPL 30 Chart at No. 7 for the week of 16 September. By the next week, the chart was renamed as RPM MAPL details. The song was now at No. 14. It was also still in the RPM 100 chart at No. 86 for that week.
