= Evolution Records =

Record label (1969–1975)

Evolution Records was a record label operated by the Stereo Dimension Records subsidiary of the Longines Symphonette Society, a unit of the Longines watch company. It was founded in 1969 as the retail arm of the mail-order Longines Symphonette Society, which typically issued box sets of old radio shows, such as a two-record set of Orson Welles's 1938 Mercury Theatre on the Air production of "The War of the Worlds", or traditional pop songs. Loren Becker was the president of the label. In 1973 the label made a concerted effort to break into the soul music genre.

The Canadian rock group Lighthouse earned Evolution its first gold record. Evolution sold Lighthouse's contract to Polydor Records, but retained rights to material originally issued on Evolution.

The 1972 Mike Quatro Jam Band single "Circus (What I Am), released on Evolution, reached No. 8 on Billboard magazine's Bubbling Under Hot 100 Singles chart and No. 91 on Cash Box Top 100 Singles chart.

Longines exited the record business in 1975.

== Artists ==
- Bloontz
- Dorothea Joyce
- Lighthouse
- Mike Quatro Jam Band
- Richard Sarstedt
- Steel River
