= John Driscoll (music producer) =

Canadian music executive and producer

- Born: John Dee Driscoll; Canada
- Occupations: Music industry executive, record producer

John Driscoll is a former music executive and record producer. He was associated with the Canadian record labels Quality Records and Ampex Records.

== Background ==
In the late 1970s, Driscoll was the A&R director for Quality Records. He worked with disco singer Karen Silver and her band Star City, and also with the studio group The Poppers.

In the 1970s Driscoll formed the Skyline record label which was closely associated with Quality Records. It served as an outlet for some of his projects which included disco singer Karen Silver and rock band Vehicle.

In addition to being head of A&R, Driscoll was also staff producer at Quality Records.

== Career ==
Working with Robert Martin, Driscoll produced the single, "Smiles and Kisses" / "You" for the group Aurora Borealis which was released on the Itco Stereo Records label in 1969.

Driscoll produced the single "Hang on Girl" for the band Wednesday, which was released on the Ampex label. Although the label struggled to secure sufficient airplay outside the Eastern provinces, the song became a minor hit and helped the band undertake a successful East Coast tour.

Working with the Canadian band Young, Driscoll produced the single "Goin' to the Country", which was released in 1971. The song became a chart hit, reaching No. 37 on the RPM singles chart during the week of May 22, 1971.

In late 1972, Driscoll produced Wednesday's single "Last Kiss". He took the recording to Toronto radio station CFTR, where it reportedly began receiving airplay almost immediately. The song later reached No. 1 on the Canadian chart and remained there for six weeks. It also earned the band an RPM Maple Leaf Award and a gold record in 1973.

Driscoll worked with rock band Vehicle that was made up of Owen Smith on vocals, Carlo de Battista on trumpet, Burt Garfield (aka Gary Pratt) on guitar, Richard Hawksby on bass and Scott Wilson on drums. They recorded some demos for Driscoll and within a year they had been signed to the Skyline label. Their self-titled debut album was released in 1977. They also released their first single, "Mr. Love" bw "Da-Nite Shuffle" on Skyline SKY-015X that year. The song got to No. 25 on the RPM Top Singles chart. The group were pictured on the front cover of the 27 August 1977 issue of RPM Weekly.

Driscoll produced the album and single for the Toronto-based five-piece rock group, Madcats. The single "Too Late for Love" bw "Take All the Love" was released on Skyline SKY-019X-M in 1978. It was an RPM Rock Pick in the 18 March issue of RPM Weekly. It was reported in the RPM Hitmakers section of the 8 April issue of RPM Weekly that the single was seeing action on CHED in Edmonton. It was also at No. 43 on the Radio Fanshawe chart. As noted in the 5 August issue of RPM Weekly, the album was getting recognition in the United States. By 24 June it was at No. 47 in the RPM 100 Album chart.

Driscoll produced Karen Silver's album Hold On I'm Coming. The title track, "Hold On I'm Coming", which was released in 1979 reached No. 15 on the Canadian disco chart.
