= Everywhere (band) =

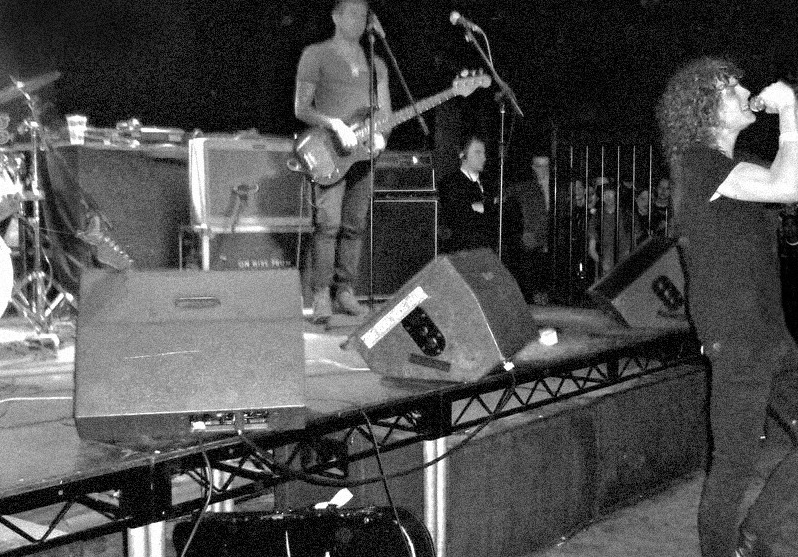

Background information
- Origin: Stockholm
- Genres: Rock
- Years active: 2012-present
- Label: Trompe L'Oeil Records
- Website: http://www.everywheretheband.com

Everywhere is a UK Alt Rock band. The band play 'Post-pop' and their sound has been compared to artists such as 'The Cure' and 'Depeche Mode'.

== Formation ==
The band formed in 2012, starting with the lead singer Max Bergå posting an ad online, leading to a selection process the singer himself described as "a bunch of washed up rockers turning up, and out of that bunch I hand-picked a few guys that seemed to have the right stuff in them.". Allegedly, the name of the band was chosen when a friend of the members sent a festival poster where he had photoshoped the word "Everywhere" as the headliner.

== Eddie' single ==
The group released its first single, 'Eddie' in 2013 as a free download and the track was described by the band itself as "a little song about a plan that completely backfired". The track was introduced to national radio in the UK by BBC Radio 2's Alex Lester and got some notable support from blogs and magazines. 'Sam Daas' of indie-blog 'Faded Glamour' called the single "a checklist for stadium pop stardom" and 'Louisa Ferguson' at 'Indie Schuffle' wrote that the song was indeed "a promising start" for the group. 'Jessica Pattengill' of Vulture Hound Magazine reviewed the track saying "One of the things that the majority of bands have lost in recent years is intimacy. The art of songwriting aims to make the listener feel whatever it is the band is singing or playing for. It’s bands like Everywhere that are trying to redeem the industry." At the time of the release, the band performed a gig at the Kaiser Chiefs Aftershow at the venue Brixton Jamm. Blogger 'Clare Knight' reviewed the performance saying "There was not a huge crowd at 8.45pm when Everywhere took the stage at Brixton Jamm. But that did not deter front man Max Berga from performing as if to the crowd at the sold out gig at the O2 just down the road", further she added, "Max took the lead when it came to crowd interaction, especially when he was complimented on his hair numerous times. “Thanks, it’s a perm”, he responded". The group also performed a gig at the NME Awards Aftershow where both Palma Violets and Django Django performed DJ-sets, and received some strong reactions, notably, BBC Introducing Radio presenter and blogger 'Jess Bracey' commented on the performance saying "their epic performance and technically tight tracks were a treat for the ears". The song 'Eddie' has also been featured in the first episode of the second season of the HBO series 'Looking'.

== American Grandeur EP' and 'Soldier' single ==
In October 2013, the band released their debut EP American Grandeur, produced by Grammy nominated engineer Mark Needham through the label 'Trompe L'Oeil Records'. 'American Grandeur' and its leading single 'Soldier' got a fair share of support. Notably, Bloomberg's rock critic 'Mark Beech' compared the band to ABBA and described the EP as a "unbland blend of pop hooks and very slick production" as well as Clash Music's 'Robin Murray' describing the leadsingle 'Soldier' as a "piano led stomper" and "pop in the grandest loosest sense of the word". The single made it into Music Week's Upfront Club Chart where it peaked at position #7. Off the back of the release, the band performed a showcase at 'Notting Hill Arts Club' in London supported by California Gypsies and The Arches. In November 2013 'Everywhere' appeared on the front-cover of 'Music Week'.
