= One Fine Morning (song) =

Single by Lighthouse

Single by Lighthouse

from the album One Fine Morning
- B-side: "Little Kind Words"
- Released: August 1971
- Genre: Jazz pop
- Length: 5:16 (album); 3:16 (single)
- Label: Evolution (US); GRT (Canada)
- Songwriter: Skip Prokop
- Producer: Jimmy Ienner

Lighthouse singles chronology
"Hats Off (To The Stranger)" (1971)	"One Fine Morning" (1971)	"Take It Slow (Out In The Country)" (1971)

"One Fine Morning" is the second single released off of Lighthouse's 1971 album, One Fine Morning. The song is one of the band's most successful singles, making the top of the charts in Canada, and becoming their most popular single released in the United States. It spent 12 weeks on the US Billboard Hot 100, debuting at number 75 the week of 11 September 1971 and peaking at number 24 the weeks of 6 and 13 November 1971.

== Charts ==
=== Weekly charts ===
Chart (1971)	Peak position
Canadian Content	1
Canada RPM Top Singles	2
Canada RPM Adult Contemporary	7
Canada CHUM Top 30 Airplay	13
Netherlands Top 30	13
US Cash Box Top 100	16
US Billboard Hot 100	24
US Adult Contemporary	30
US Record World Top Singles	14
US Record World Adult Contemporary	29

=== Year-end charts ===
Chart (1971)	Rank
Canada RPM Top Singles	30
Canada CHUM Year End Singles	53
US Billboard Hot 100	153
