= Scott Richards (musician) =

- Born: Circa 1944
- Died: 2003
- Occupations: Musician, Music industry executive, record label founder
- Instrument: Bass
- Works: 1960s to 2000s
- Label: Freedom Records Inc.
- Formerly of: The Shays
- Spouse: Linda Dawe

Scott Richards was a musician, vice-president of the Canadian branch of MCA Records and founder of the Canadian Freedom Records label.

== Background ==
During the 1960s, Scott Richards was a member of The Shays who were the backing group for singer David Clayton-Thomas.

After his time as a performing musician, he joined Apex, a division of Compo. While with Apex, he was instrumental in taking Apex from an obscure label, back into a prominent position within the music industry. Following that, he was employed by RCA as Regional Promotion Manager, then he we went to MCA Records. He was with MCA for around eight years until 1980.

== Career (musician) ==
Richards was a member of The Shays, the backing band for David Clayton-Thomas. He was the group's bass guitarist. Other members included, Fred Keeler on guitar, John Weatheral on drums and Gord Fleming on keyboards. They recorded the album, David Clayton Thomas and the Shays À Go-Go which was released in 1964 / 1965. The tracks included, "Take Me Back", "Boom Boom" and "Walk that Walk".

== Career (music industry executive) ==
On 13 December 1969, Richards coordinated a show at premises formerly known as the Rock Pile Club. Acts Lighthouse and Edward Bear played to a capacity audience of around 2500 attendees. On the 19th, the first annual promotion men's luncheon was held at Ports of Call. Richards and Joe Woodhouse of Capitol Records organized the event.

As of 1976, Richards was national promotion manager for MCA. It was reported in the 20 March 1976 issue of RPM Weekly that he had announced the appointment of former CBS A&R staffer Linda Dawe as the promotion representative of the Eastern and Northern Ontario territories.

It was reported in the 3 March 1979 issue of RPM Weekly that Richards had recently re-introduced the Apex label in Canada. Having been wound down many years prior, it was re-introduced for the main purpose of being an outlet for developing Canadian talent.

Richards was involved in the production of Daniel Lavoie's Nirvana Bleu album that was released on the Apex label in 1979. Richards was the creative director for the The Good Old Days album by Don Messer and His Islanders that was also released that year.

Along with Robert Leth of Falcon Records and Stan Klees of RPM Weekly, Richards was a panelist at a 3DIM event for demonstrating of video discs on 31 March 1980.

Richards produced the Mondo Combo More Money Than Brains album that was released on Freedom Records Inc in 1981.

With the Freedom label still in its fresh stages, Richards was quoted in the 30 January 1982 issue of RPM Weekly saying that there was a real international market for Canadian records. The artists on the Freedom roster included the Grant Fullerton Band, Coyote, and Mondo Combo. Having already made contacts at MIDEM, he was looking forward to a second visit there in 1982 as a continuation of establishing Freedom Records as a label and a name. At the time he was also making a big push to deal with international markets other than North America. Since having left MCA his association with RCA was said to be "tremendous" and his association with CIRPA was just as positive.

Working with former Ronnie Hawkins guitarist, John Lewis, he both produced and added backing vocals to his Prisoner of Gravity album that was released on Freedom Records Inc. in 1987.

In 1990, Richards was appointed to the position of director of recording arts management at the Toronto-based organization, Harris Institute for The Arts. Richards had actually been associated with the organization for some time prior to the appointment. His role in coordinating the Recording Arts Management (RAM) was overseeing twelve months of intensive training in music industry management. His appointment to the position was announced by John Harris, the director of the institute.

In 1991, Richards and Linda Dawe formed the company Music Solutions. They did well, working with artists like Helmut Lotti, Emma Shapplin, and Andre Gagnon. Also through Willi Morrison, their UK associate, they managed to attain major international record contracts for Matt Dusk and RyanDan with the Decca / Universal entities. At some stage, Richards and Dawe had become husband and wife.

== Death ==
In 2003, Dawe kissed her husband Scott goodbye and embarked on a journey to the UK to work with Willi Morrison. Later in the day he died as a result of a heart attack. He was 59 years old.
