= Lighthouse (band) =

Canadian rock band formed 1969

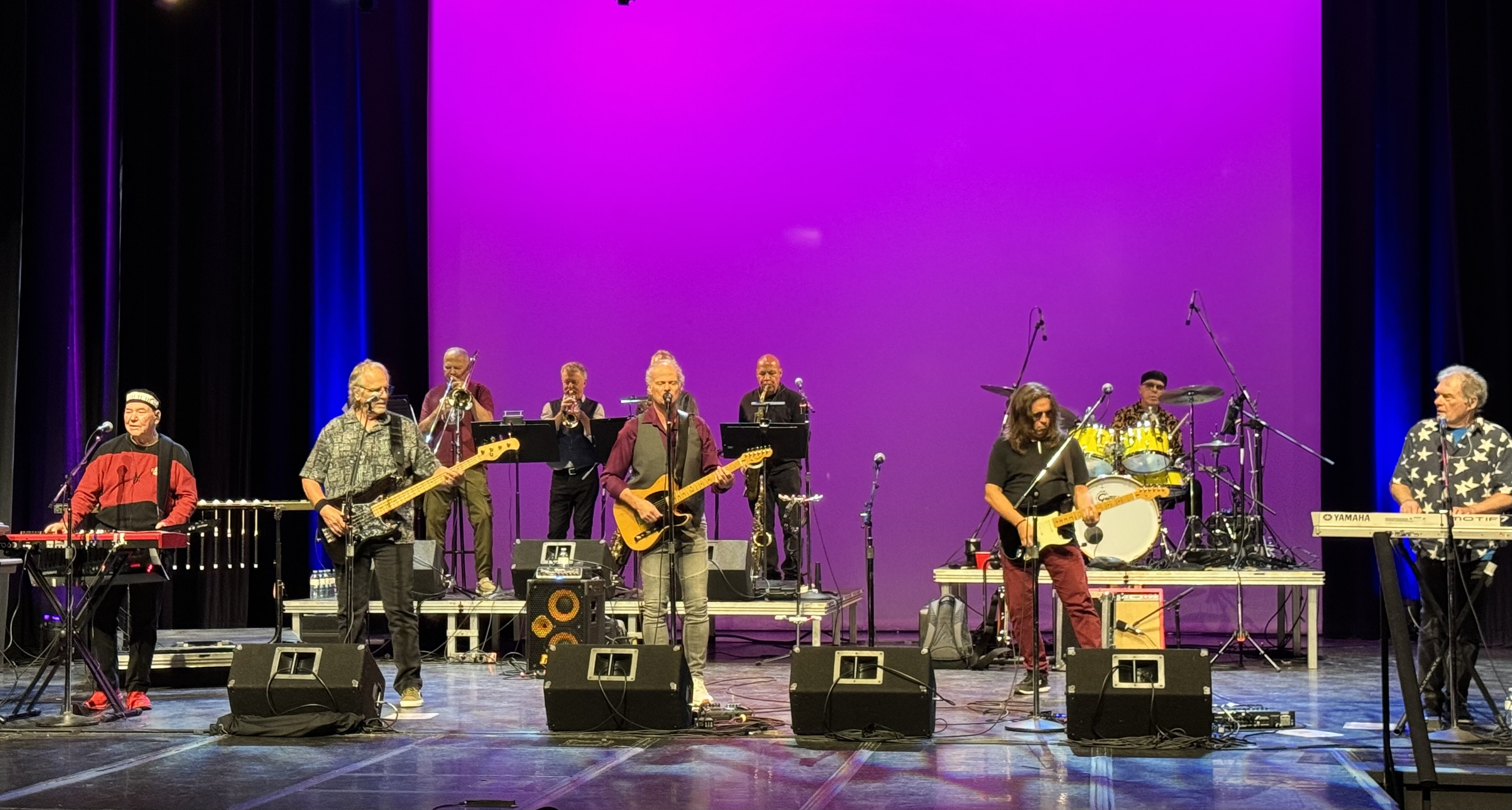
- Lighthouse performing at a concert in Newmarket Ontario

Background information
- Origin: Toronto, Ontario, Canada
- Genres: Rock; jazz rock
- Years active: 1969–1974; 1975; 1976; 1978–1979; 1980; 1982; 1992–present
- Labels: RCA; GRT; Evolution; Vertigo; Polydor; Janus; Denon; Universal
- Website: www.lighthouserockson.com

Lighthouse is a Canadian rock band formed in 1969 in Toronto, Ontario, whose repertoire included elements of rock music, jazz, classical music, and swing and featured horns, string instruments, and vibraphone. They won Juno Awards for Best Canadian Group of the Year in 1972, 1973, and 1974.

== Band history ==
=== Formation ===
Lighthouse was formed in 1969 in Toronto by vocalist/drummer Skip Prokop, previously of the Paupers, and keyboardist Paul Hoffert. The two met on a flight from New York City to Toronto, and discussed forming a band structured around a rock rhythm section, jazz horn section, and classical string section. Prokop had admired Ralph Cole's playing when they shared the bill at the Grande Ballroom in Detroit, so he invited him to Toronto to be the band's guitarist. Prokop and Hoffert assembled the rest of the group from friends, studio session musicians, and Toronto Symphony Orchestra members, and proceeded to make a demo recording.

Prokop and Hoffert took the demo to MGM Records in New York, who signed the band. Two days later they had a manager, Vinnie Fusco, from Albert Grossman's office, who overturned the MGM contract and made a deal with RCA Victor.

Lighthouse made its performing debut on May 14, 1969, at The Rock Pile in Toronto, introduced by Duke Ellington with the words, "I'm beginning to see the Light...house". The band originally consisted of 13 members:

- Skip Prokop: drums and vocals
- Paul Hoffert: keyboards and vibraphone
- Ralph Cole: guitar and vocals
- Grant Fullerton: bass and vocals
- Vic "Pinky" Dauvin: percussion and lead vocals
- Ian Guenther: violin
- Don Dinovo: violin and viola
- Don Whitton: cello
- Leslie Schneider: cello
- Freddy Stone: trumpet and flugelhorn
- Arnie Chycoski: trumpet and flugelhorn
- Howard Shore: alto saxophone
- Russ Little: trombone

One of the first Lighthouse concerts was at Carnegie Hall, and in its first year the band also played at Fillmore East, Fillmore West, Toronto, Boston, the Atlantic City Pop Festival, and the Monterey and Newport Jazz Festivals. A free concert at Toronto City Hall in the summer of 1969 drew a reported crowd of 25,000.

=== First albums ===
Their first album, Lighthouse, was released in June 1969 by RCA recorded in RCA's Toronto Eastern Sound Studio. It features "If There Ever Was a Time", which was a minor hit on the popular Toronto radio station CHUM 1050 at number 24..

Their next album, Suite Feeling, was released in November 1969, recorded at Toronto Eastern Sound Studio. It features two cover songs: The Band's "Chest Fever" and The Beatles' "A Day In The Life". The single "Feel So Good" was a hit, peaking at #5 on the Canadian Content chart and #55 on the Canadian Top 100. Lighthouse was invited to perform at Woodstock that year, but turned it down.

Their third and final album for RCA was also the last for original lead singer Pinky Dauvin. Peacing It All Together was recorded in RCA's Music Centre of the World Hollywood Studios. It includes the Top 40 hit, "The Chant".

In the summer of 1970, Lighthouse represented Canada and Ontario at Expo '70 in Japan. The band appeared at the Strawberry Fields Festival in August 1970, followed by the Isle of Wight Festival where they performed two nights, along with The Doors, Joni Mitchell, Chicago, Miles Davis, and The Who.

=== New record label ===
At the end of 1970, due to less than expected sales, Lighthouse was dropped from RCA and moved to Evolution in the US and GRT in Canada, recording at Toronto's Thunder Sound Studios. There were some lineup changes; the band dropped from thirteen musicians to eleven, including five original members (Prokop, Hoffert, Cole, Dinovo, and Shore), and Bob McBride became the band's new lead singer.

=== One Fine Morning and commercial success ===
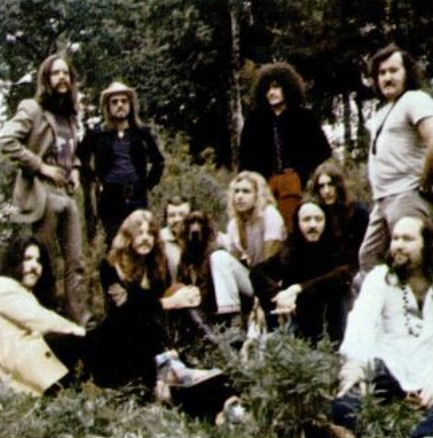
The band in 1971

In July 1971, Lighthouse released One Fine Morning on Evolution/GRT. The title track from One Fine Morning was a hit in Canada, peaking at #2 on Canada's Singles Chart, eventually going platinum. The song was also an international and American hit, peaking at #24 on the Billboard Hot 100 chart, going gold, and the 'bubbling under' chart in the Netherlands. It was preceded on the Canadian charts by "Hats Off to the Stranger" (#9), yet another gold single. The album cover features psychedelic artwork by artist Brad Johannsen. That year the band performed at the anniversary celebration concert in the city of Hamilton.

In between recording albums and touring 300 days a year, the band was involved in the first performances by a rock band with symphony orchestras, a collaboration with the Royal Winnipeg Ballet company, Ballet High, which toured across Canada, and a CBC production of Prometheus Bound with actress Irene Worth.

=== Thoughts of Movin' On ===
Thoughts of Movin' On was released on December 8, 1971. The lead single "Take It Slow (Out In The Country)" went to #12 on the Canadian Top 100, going gold. The album also features the hits "I Just Wanna Be Your Friend" (#54) and "I'd Be So Happy" (#32), the latter covered by Three Dog Night on their 1974 album Hard Labor. Thoughts of Movin' On also featured album artwork by Brad Johannsen. Both Thoughts of Movin' On and One Fine Morning eventually went platinum in Canada.

=== Lighthouse Live! and Sunny Days ===
Lighthouse Live! was recorded live at Carnegie Hall in February 1972 and released on Evolution/GRT. This was the first time a Canadian album went platinum.

The band returned to the studio later that year releasing another gold album, Sunny Days, on Evolution/GRT. The title track became the band's second Top 5 Canadian hit single and second to go platinum. It was also a Top 40 hit on the Billboard Hot 100, peaking at #34 on December 9, 1972. Hoffert, tired of life on the road, left the band shortly after but continued as the band's executive producer.

During this period of recording from 1970 to 1972 with Evolution/GRT, RCA Records released a double album best-of in 1972 consisting of selections from the first three albums recorded with RCA entitled One Fine Light.

=== Can You Feel It ===
Bob McBride failed to appear at The Record Plant in New York City for the recording of their next album, Can You Feel It, and was fired. Prokop and Cole wanted to scrap the sessions but producer Jimmy Ienner insisted they continue. He decided that whoever wrote the song would sing it. Evolution sold the band's recording contract to Polydor in the US, which reportedly cost the label "six figures". With the exception of "No More Searching", written and sung by new sax player Dale Hillary, Prokop and Cole sang all the vocals and harmonies on the album. The result was one of the band's biggest single releases, "Pretty Lady", which was a Top 10 Canadian hit, and was their final Hot 100 hit in the US, reaching #53. It did better in Hawaii however, where it reached #1 for six consecutive weeks. Both the album and the single went gold in Canada.

=== Good Day and dissolution ===
Good Day, also on Polydor, was released in mid-September 1974. As with the previous album, the lead vocals were divided between Skip Prokop and Ralph Cole, but Prokop switched to guitar full-time and the drummer was Billy King. The album went gold and produced a minor hit with the title track. It also contains "Wide-Eyed Lady", a song co-written by Bob McBride.

At Thunder Sounds Recording Studios, the band began work on the next album, and had recorded several tracks when Prokop called it quits and left the band. The album was never completed.

Janus/GRT released Best of Lighthouse in January 1975 to capitalize on their past success. The album went gold in Canada.

Paul Hoffert recruited new members and Ralph Cole took the band out for another couple of tours with Doug Billard (formerly a member of Pepper Tree, Central Nervous System, and Five Sounds) as lead vocalist but in 1976 Lighthouse disbanded. Cole toured as Lighthouse once again from 1978 to 1980 with a nearly completely new lineup consisting of only one other previous Lighthouse member, Dale Hillary.

=== Reunion ===
Prokop, Hoffert, Cole, and McBride reunited along with many of the Lighthouse alumni in September 1982 for a weekend of four large concerts at Ontario Place. Afterwards the members went their separate ways and made no future plans.

In 1989, Denon Records bought the rights to the Evolution/GRT recordings and released a greatest hits collection in Canada, The Best of Lighthouse - Sunny Days Again. The re-mix of the album was produced by Hoffert, Cole, Prokop, and McBride.

In 1992, the band reunited with a ten-member line-up which included founders Prokop, Hoffert, and Cole with McBride on vocals. McBride was dismissed several months later. He was replaced by Dan Clancy.

Three years later Song of the Ages, the band's first new studio album in 22 years, was released by Breaking Records. The single, "Remember the Times", was a top-thirty hit in Canada. In 1998, the original master tapes of The Best of Lighthouse - Sunny Days Again were digitally re-mastered and released on CD by True North Records who also re-released Song of the Ages in 1999.

== After disbandment ==
After Lighthouse disbanded in the 1970s, many of the members continued with their musical careers while some went in different directions.

Paul Hoffert has continued his career as a film composer, winning a Genie Award in 1978 for his score for the cult-hit movie Outrageous!; headed up the Ontario Arts Council from 1994 to 1997; created and was the Director of CulTech from 1992 to 2000, a Research Centre at York University, and has written five books exploring the intersection of culture and technology. In 2004 he received the Order of Canada.

Prokop and Cole formed other bands with some success before hitting their stride in the advertising world and as record producers. Saxophonist Howard Shore became the music director for Saturday Night Live and began a career in film composition, emerging as one of Hollywood's most sought after composers. Shore won three Academy Awards for The Lord of the Rings film trilogy. Don DiNovo bought a church in Arthur, Ontario, and turned it into a recording studio. Dick Armin continued his work as a creator of electronic string instruments.

Russ Little has continued as a musician and composer. He can be heard on numerous releases including his own albums, Snapshot, Footwork, and On the Shoulders of Giants. He was voted Best Trombonist of 2007 by Canada's National Jazz Awards. John Naslen became a recording engineer (he engineered the 1994 Lighthouse "Song of the Ages" release). Grant Fullerton continues to perform with his own band.

Louie Yacknin opted out of music altogether and bought a tire installation company. Larry Smith moved to Israel and created a software company for language translation. Bob McBride became a top studio session singer and was heard on numerous commercials but he suffered from drug abuse and serious illness, and died February 20, 1998, of heart failure in Toronto.

Arnie Chycoski, Don DiNovo, Keith Jollimore, Alan Wilmot, Dale Hillary, Freddy Stone, Pinky Dauvin, Joe Ambrosia, and Skip Prokop are all deceased.

Lighthouse has remained together since they reunited in 1992. Since that time they have recorded one new studio album, Song of the Ages, released in 1996. The rhythm section for the ten-member group features the original founders, Prokop (drums), Hoffert (keyboards and vibraphone), and Cole (guitar) with Don Paulton (keyboard), Doug Moore (bass), and Dan Clancy (vocals). The horn section is made up of original member, trombonist Russ Little, Simon Wallis (saxophones and flute), Chris Howells (trumpet), and saxophonist Steve Kennedy who performed with the band at Ontario Place in 1982. Lighthouse continues to perform and create innovative works including a reunion concert with the Edmonton Symphony Orchestra that was broadcast nationally, a tour of Brazil with an original multimedia stage show in collaboration with the Desrosiers Dance Theatre, and a series of concerts in which sections of the band performed in different locations across Toronto linked together by broadband cable. In 1995 Lighthouse was inducted into the Q107 Canadian Rock 'n' Roll Hall of Fame.

Lighthouse songs have been used in films and covered by other artists including Three Dog Night, Shobha, and Carlos Santana. Rap artist Akon has sampled "I'd Be So Happy" and Japanese rock stars Theatre Brook perform "One Fine Morning" in their stage show.

== Recent activity ==
For Lighthouse's 40th anniversary, Ole/Universal Records released 40 Years of Sunny Days, a retrospective of their biggest hits, featuring digitally remastered tracks, and a DVD of new performances recorded at Q Music in 5.1 Surround Sound.

On July 19, 2013, it was announced that the band would be appearing on the second annual Moody Blues Cruise in April 2014, on the cruise ship MSC Divina.

In April 2013, Skip Prokop suffered from ventricular tachycardia. A device was implanted to regulate his heart. Prokop toured with Lighthouse throughout 2013 but was diagnosed with Type 2 Diabetes, then suffered more heart trouble requiring bypass surgery. He officially retired from music in 2016 and died at the age of 73 on August 30, 2017, from heart complications. He was replaced by his son, Jamie Prokop.

The band's most recent compilation album, Icon, was released on August 10, 2018.

They continue to perform and tour extensively across Canada.

== Members ==
Current members

- Ralph Cole – guitar (1968–1974, 1982, 1992–present)
- Paul Hoffert – keys (1968–1973, 1982, 1992–present)
- Russ Little – horns (1968–1970, 1992–present)
- Steve Kennedy – horn (1982, 1992–present)
- Doug Moore – bass (1992–present)
- Simon Wallis – horns (1992–present)
- Dan Clancy – lead vocals (1993–present)
- Don Paulton – keys (1994–present)
- Chris Howells – horns (1996–present)
- Jamie Prokop – drums (2014–present)

Former members

- Skip Prokop – drums, vocals (1968–1974, 1982, 1992–2014), guitar (1974)
- Don DiNovo – strings (1968–1974)
- Dick Armin – strings (1968–1974)
- Howard Shore – horns (1968–1973)
- Grant Fullerton – bass (1968–1971)
- Leslie Schneider – strings (1968–1971)
- Arnie Chycoski – horns (1968–1969, 1970–1971)
- Pinky Dauvin – lead vocals (1968–1970)
- Freddy Stone – horns (1968–1969)
- Don Whitton – strings (1968–1969)
- Ian Guenther – strings (1968–1969)
- Bruce Cassidy – horns (1969–1971)
- Paul Armin – strings (1969–1971)
- Myron Moskalyk – strings (1969–1970)
- Paul Adamson – horns (1969–1970)
- Bob McBride – lead vocals (1970–1973, 1982)
- Larry Smith – horns (1970–1973), keys (1973–1974)
- Louie Tacknin – bass (1971–1972)
- Keith Jollimore – horns (1971–1972)
- Mike Malone – horns (1971–1972)
- Pete Pantaluk – horns (1971)
- Alan Wilmot – bass (1972–1974)
- John Naslen – horns (1972–1974)
- Dale Hillary – horns (1973–1974)
- Rick Stepton – horns (1973–1974)
- Terry Wilkins – bass (1974)
- Sam See – keys (1974)
- Billy King – drums (1974)
- John Dell – drums (1982)
- Donald Quan – keys, strings (1992–1994)
- Rick Waychesko – horns (1992–1996)

== Awards and nominations ==
Year	Nominated work	Award	Result
1970	RCA	Best Overall Record Company	Won
1971	Themselves	Group of the Year	Nominated
1971	"One Fine Morning"	Song of The Year	Won
1972	Themselves	Juno Award for Outstanding Performance of the Year – Group	Won
1972	GRT of Canada Ltd.	Canadian Content Record Company of the Year	Won
1972	Bob McBride and Skip Prokop with "I Just Wanna Be Your Friend"	BMI Canada Limited Certificate of Honor	Won
1972	Ralph Cole, Keith Jollimore, and Larry Smith with "Take It Slow (Out In The Country)"	BMI Canada Limited Certificate of Honor	Won
1972	"Take It Slow (Out In The Country)"	Moffat Award for Best Record	Won
1973	Themselves	Vocal Instrumental Group of the Year	Won
1973	Bob McBride	Outstanding Performance - Male	Won
1973	Bob McBride with "Pretty Lady"	BMI Canada Limited Certificate of Honor	Won
1973	Skip Prokop with "Sunny Days"	BMI Canada Limited Certificate of Honor	Won
1973	Skip Prokop with "You Girl"	BMI Canada Limited Certificate of Honor	Won
1973	Bob McBride	Billboard Country Genre Program Director of The Year	Nominated
1974	Themselves	Group of the Year	Won
1974	Skip Prokop with "Pretty Lady"	Canadian Composer of The Year	Nominated
1974	Skip Prokop with "Pretty Lady"	Best Songwriter	Nominated
1974	Bob McBride	Best Male Vocalist	Nominated
1974	GRT of Canada Ltd.	Canadian Content Record Company of the Year	Won
1974	GRT of Canada Ltd.	Canadian Record Company of the Year In Promotional Activities	Nominated
1974	GRT of Canada Ltd.	Canadian Record Company of the Year (Manufacturer and Distributor)	Nominated
1974	Skip Prokop with "Pretty Lady"	Canadian Contemporary Single of The Year	Nominated
1974	Can You Feel It	Canadian Contemporary Album of the Year	Nominated
1974	"Pretty Lady"	Billboard Talent in Action Award for Best Vocal and Instrumental Group	Won
1974	Bob McBride	Billboard Talent in Action Award for Best Vocalist with Group	Won
1974	Skip Prokop with "Pretty Lady"	BMI Canada Limited Certificate of Honor	Won
1974	Bob McBride with "Do It Right"	BMI Canada Limited Certificate of Honor	Won
1975	Themselves	Group of the Year	Nominated

== Discography ==
=== Studio/live/compilation albums ===
Year	Album	Canada	US Top 200	US Cash Box	US Record World	Certifications
1969	Lighthouse	-	-	-	-	CAN: Gold
1969	Suite Feeling	-	-	-	-	CAN: Gold
1970	Peacing It All Together	73	133	-	104	CAN: Gold
1971	One Fine Morning	14	80	48	58	CAN: Platinum
1971	Thoughts of Movin' On	11	157	75	89	CAN: Platinum
1971	One Fine Light (Double Best Of)	-	-	-	-	
1972	Lighthouse Live!	8	178	122	122	CAN: Platinum
1972	Sunny Days	7	190	165	140	CAN: Gold
1973	Can You Feel It	8	-	145	-	CAN: Gold
1974	Good Day	-	-	-	-	CAN: Gold
1976	Best of Lighthouse	56	-	-	-	CAN: Gold
1978	K-Tel presents Lighthouse - 20 Great Hits	-	-	-	-	
1989	Sunny Days Again: The Best of Lighthouse	80	-	-	-	
1991	Lighthouse Live! (CD re-release)	-	-	-	-	
1994	Festival 94 (EP)	-	-	-	-	
1996	Song of the Ages	-	-	-	-	
1998	Sunny Days Again: The Best of Lighthouse (CD re-release)	-	-	-	-	
1998	Lighthouse Live! (re-release)	-	-	-	-	
1999	Song of the Ages (re-release)	-	-	-	-	
2009	40 Years of Sunny Days	159	-	-	-	CAN: Gold
2010	20th Century Masters – The Millennium Collection: The Best of Lighthouse	-	-	-	-	CAN: Gold
2018	Lighthouse Icon Series	-	-	-	-	
2020	Lighthouse 50th Anniversary Live in Concert	-	-	-	-	

=== Singles ===
Year	Song	Canada RPM 100	Canada RPM AC	US US BB	US US CB	US AC	Certifications	Album
1969	"If There Ever Was a Time"	-	-	-	-	-		Lighthouse
1969	"Feel So Good"	55	-	-	-	-		Suite Feeling
1970	"The Chant"	39	30	-	-	-		Peacing It All Together
1971	"Hats Off (To the Stranger)"	9	-	-	-	-	CAN: Gold	One Fine Morning
1971	"One Fine Morning"	2	-	24	16	30	CAN: Platinum / US: Gold	One Fine Morning
1971	"Take It Slow (Out in the Country)"	12	-	64	63	-	CAN: Gold	Thoughts of Movin' On
1972	"I Just Wanna Be Your Friend"	54	-	93	-	-		Thoughts of Movin' On
1972	"Sunny Days"	4	11	34	37	-	CAN: Platinum	Sunny Days
1973	"You Girl"	17	-	114	107	-		Sunny Days
1973	"Broken Guitar Blues"	34	-	-	-	-		Sunny Days
1973	"Pretty Lady" (Note: "Pretty Lady" made number one in Hawaii for 6 consecutive weeks.)	9	-	53	31	38	CAN: Gold	Can You Feel It
1974	"Can You Feel It?"	19	-	-	-	-		Can You Feel It
1974	"Magic's in the Dancing"	-	-	-	-	-		Can You Feel It
1974	"Good Day"	66	-	-	-	-		Good Day
1974	"Eight Miles High" (Note: "Eight Miles High", taken from the band's Best of Lighthouse LP, was released as a single in November 1974. It was not included on Good Day, however the B-side, "Got a Feeling", was.)	-	-	-	-	-		Best of Lighthouse/Good Day
1976	"One Fine Morning"/"Sunny Days"	-	-	-	-	-		Best of Lighthouse
1978	"One Fine Morning"/"Sunny Days" (re-issue)	-	-	-	-	-		One Fine Morning/Sunny Days
1996	"Remember the Times"	-	22	-	-	-		Song of the Ages
2017	"Tower of Song"	-	-	-	-	-		Non-album single
