= Quality Records =

Canadian record label

Quality Records was a Canadian entertainment company which released music albums in Canada on behalf of American record labels. They also released recordings by Canadian artists.

The company operated between 1950 and 1985 with offices in Toronto. The company also ran from 1990 to 1998 as "Quality Special Products" with Offices both in Canada and the United States.

== History ==
In the 1950s and 1960s it was commonplace for American labels without Canadian branches to lease their recordings out to Canadian-based labels that would release the songs on their behalf north of the border. Quality was one of the largest and most visible of these companies; aside from the Quality brand itself, several other sister labels such as Reo were employed for this purpose. US labels distributed via Quality included Essex Records, Chess Records and Sun Records. As a result, it was through Quality that Canadian audiences first heard the music of Bill Haley and His Comets, Chuck Berry, Carl Perkins, Jerry Lee Lewis, Johnny Cash and other early rock and roll artists.

Bobby Gimby's song "Canada" as sung by the Young Canada Singers was released in 1967 as a 45 rpm single by Quality on behalf of Canada's Centennial Commission. It set a sales record for Canadian single releases.

Stompin' Tom Connors recordings made by CKGB radio in 1967 were pressed by Quality Records and distributed by Connors himself.

The company won in the category of Best Company for Canadian Content at the Gold Leaf Awards of 1970 and the Juno Awards of 1971.

In the mid-80s, Quality Records replaced K-tel International as a distributor of various artist compilations in Canada, most notably with the Rock series (Rock '85, Rock '86, etc.) and 'This is Music' series.

It closed down in 1985. However, in 1990, it revived as Quality Music & Video for new recordings, notably Dan Hill's 1991 album Dance of Love and Timmy T's number 1 pop hit "One More Try". However, it folded again in 1997 & a selection of the US catalog rights were sold to Warlock Records, a New York-based record label that acquired the catalog numbers of Sleeping Bag Records. Quality also had some of its domestic artist releases distributed through Critique Records and Popular Records in the United States for their compilations, including the "Dance Mix USA" series.

In the 90's Quality Records rebranded as Quality Special Products, Quality Records along with MuchMusic put out the Dance Mix series from 1990 to 1997. Quality Records folded in 1997 in Canada shortly before their American branch folded in 1998.

The Dance Mix series was rebranded MuchDance in late 1997 after Much's contract with Quality Records expired.

== Subsidiary ==
A small article appeared in the 27 June 1970 issue of Billboard, informing that Quality Records had set up a new label, Celebration. The name came from a promotion magazine of theirs which was edited by Mel Shaw. He was also named as the man who would coordinate the new label and handle its promotion. The fledgling label kicked off with "Love is All" by Montreal artist Patrick Norman.

Skyline Records was closely associated with Quality Records. It was formed in the 1970s by producer John Driscoll. It served as an outlet for some of his projects which included disco singer Karen Silver, rock band Vehicle and Madcats.

== Distributor ==
In addition to its own Quality label, Quality also distributed for the Birchmount, and Celebration labels and the independent Broadland, Kanata, MWC (Music World Creations), and Reo labels.
