= Funky Sounds Nurtured in the Fertile Soil of Memphis That Smell of Rock =

Studio album by Eric Mercury
- Released: 1971
- Label: Enterprise
- Producer: Steve Cropper

Eric Mercury chronology
Electric Black Man (1969)	Funky Sounds Nurtured in the Fertile Soil of Memphis That Smell of Rock (1971)	Love Is Taking Over (1973)

Funky Sounds Nurtured in the Fertile Soil of Memphis That Smell of Rock is an album by Eric Mercury. Released in 1971, it contains the hit single, "I Can Smell That Funky Music". The album was successful, registering on the RPM 100 Albums chart in Canada.

== Background ==
The album was arranged and produced by Steve Cropper. It was released on Enterprise ENS-1020 in August / September 1971.

The title printed on the album's original record label is Funky... Rock. Sometimes it is also referred to as Funky Sounds or Funky Rock.

== Reception ==
In the 4 September 1971 issue of Record World, the reviewer believes Mercury "should have no trouble going that much further when word of the album gets around."

In the 4 December 1971 issue of RPM Weekly, the reviewer wrote that Mercury's voice is much improved and soulful and thought the album would "smash his way up the charts with no trouble". It was also written in the same issue that was proving his point with his Enterprise single and album.

According to the 11 March 1972 issue of RPM Weekly, Stax-Enterprise artist, Eric Mercury's album had favorable reviews throughout the United States. There were now plans for Mercury and Steve Cropper to produce a second album for the label in Toronto, and he would be the first Stax act to do this.

== Airplay ==
It was reported by Record World in the magazine's 4 September issue that the album was getting airplay at four FM stations.

It was reported in the 18 December 1971 issue of RPM Weekly that with the single "I Can Smell That Funky Music" experiencing a national breakout in Canada, Eric Mercury and Allan Katz, the national advertising chief for Polydor, the distributor for Enterprise Records had just completed their trip through Central & Western Canada. In addition to success of the single, the album was getting heavy air play from several progressive FM stations.

== Charts ==
For the week of 18 December 1971, Funky Sounds debuted at No. 95 in the RPM Weekly RPM 100 Albums chart. The album peaked at No. 58 for the week of 26 February 1972. It was still in the chart for the week of 11 March.

== Tracks ==
Side A

1. "I Can Smell That Funky Music" (Eddie Floyd, Mack Rice, Steve Cropper) – 3:49
2. "Like It Should Be" (William Smith) – 3:37
3. "Stop Looking Down" (Mary Williams, Cropper) – 3:00
4. "It's Time for Me to Love You" (Eric Mercury, Cropper) – 9:23

Side B

1. "Don't Stop the Feeling" (Mack Rice, Cropper, Tommy Tate) – 3:07
2. "Wrap Me in a Map" (Mercury, Cropper) – 3:53
3. "Listen With Your Eyes" (Carson Whitsett, Mercury) – 3:18
4. "A Gift to You" (Williams, Rice, Cropper) – 3:43
5. "Over In Arkansas" (Mercury, Williams, Cropper) – 4:24

== Personnel ==
- Eric Mercury – lead vocals
- Jim Johnson – bass
- Richie Simpson – drums
- Paul Cannon – guitar
- Steve Cropper – guitar
- Jay Spell – piano, organ
- William "Smitty" Smith – organ
- TMI staff – backing vocals
