= Brand New (Gary Stewart album) =

Studio album by Gary Stewart
- Released: 1988
- Studio: Music City Music Hall (Nashville, Tennessee)
- Genre: Country
- Label: HighTone
- Producer: Roy Dea

Gary Stewart chronology
20 of the Best (1984)	Brand New (1988)	Battleground (1990)

Brand New is an album by the American musician Gary Stewart, released in 1988. It was regarded as a comeback album; Stewart had spent years dealing with personal issues. The first single was "Brand New Whiskey".

== Production ==
Stewart realized that he had to make another album when he noticed his concert attendance declining; it took him a while to get back into the groove of songwriting. The album was produced by Roy Dea, who had worked with Stewart on earlier albums. Its production was chaotic, with Stewart failing to complete songs or missing recording sessions. Stewart cowrote eight of the songs. David Briggs contributed to Brand New.

== Critical reception ==
Professional ratings
Review scores
Source	Rating
AllMusic	3/5 stars
Chicago Sun-Times	4/4 stars
Robert Christgau	B
The Encyclopedia of Popular Music	2/5 stars
The Rolling Stone Album Guide	3/5 stars

Robert Christgau noted that "hard living deepens great voices, but it's hell on the smaller ones, and so naturally Stewart compensates by oversinging." The Los Angeles Times wrote: "Sounding inspired and refreshed, Stewart retains the unmistakable vocal quaver." The Chicago Sun-Times considered Brand New to be the ninth best album of 1988, concluding that, "at his rawest, the honky-tonk veteran sounds like the missing link between George Jones and Jerry Lee Lewis, but Stewart originals such as 'I Owe It All to My Heart', 'An Empty Glass' and 'Ramona' show a subtlety beyond either of them."

The Advocate opined that "it's clear that Stewart is still in great vocal form and a singer who somehow still hasn't received the widespread acclaim that he deserves." The Orange County Register stated that "Stewart brings the grease and the glory, the sleaze and the sublime of the honky-tonk world to life."

AllMusic called the album "a collection of bar-slammin' good-time rowdy honky tonk songs and broken, screwed-up love songs seen from the bottom of a glass."

== Track listing ==
No.	Title	Length
1.	"Brand New Whiskey" (Gary Stewart, Mary Lou Stewart)	2:25
2.	"Son of a Honky Tonk Woman" (G. Stewart, M. L. Stewart)	2:45
3.	"I Owe It All to My Heart" (G. Stewart, Dean Dillon, Tanya Tucker)	3:20
4.	"Lucretia" (G. Stewart, M. L. Stewart)	3:16
5.	"An Empty Glass" (G. Stewart, D. Dillon)	3:41
6.	"Rainin' Rainin' Rainin'" (G. Stewart, M. L. Stewart, Don Smith)	4:22
7.	"Looking for Some Brand New Stuff" (Sonny Tackett)	3:06
8.	"Ramona" (G. Stewart, M. L. Stewart)	3:32
9.	"I Get Drunk" (G. Stewart, Steve Hunter)	1:58
10.	"Murdered by Love" (Roguie Ray Lamontagne, Billy Stone, Donald Mealer)	4:18
