= 20 of the Best (Gary Stewart album) =

Compilation album by Gary Stewart
- Released: 1984
- Genre: Country
- Length: 53:44
- Label: RCA
- Producer: Bill Williams, Gary Wallington

Gary Stewart chronology
Those Were the Days (1983)	20 of the Best (1984)	Brand New (1988)

20 of the Best is a compilation album by American country music singer and songwriter Gary Stewart released in 1984 by RCA Records. In the period 1973 to 1983 Stewart enjoyed over twenty US Billboard country hits with RCA, including three duets with label-mate Dean Dillon. The tracks on this album spent over two hundred and ten weeks in the Billboard Country Charts and the track list includes a number of top-twenty successes.

== Track listing ==
Side 1

1. "Drinkin' Thing” (Wayne Carson) – 2:57
2. "Ramblin' Man" (Richard Betts) – 2:39
3. "She's Actin' Single (I'm Drinkin' Doubles)” (Wayne Carson) – 2:46
4. "Mazelle" (Kirkpatrick) – 3:11
5. "Oh, Sweet Temptation" (Wayne Carson) – 2:49
6. "Quits" (Danny O’Keffe) – 3:15
7. "Whiskey Trip" (Wayne Carson, Donn Tankersley) – 3:07
8. "Cactus and a Rose" (Chips Moman, Bobby Emmons) – 3:21
9. "She’s Got a Drinking Problem" (Morrison, Tim DuBois, Newton) – 2:42
10. "Brotherly Love" (with Dean Dillon) (Gary Stewart, Dean Dillon) - 2:39

Side 2

1. "Out of Hand" (Tom Jans, Jeff Barry) – 2:47
2. "Flat Natural Born Good Timin’ Man" (Gary Stewart) – 2:44
3. "In Some Room Above the Street" (Sterling Whipple) – 3:05
4. "Your Place or Mine" (Rory Michael Bourke, Carol Anderson, M. B. Anderson) – 3:01
5. "Ten Years of This" (Gary Stewart, Wayne Carson) – 2:33
6. "Single Again" (Gary Stewart) – 3:01
7. "Stone Wall (Around Your Heart)" (Pat Twitty) – 3:08
8. "Are We Dreamin’ the Same Dream" (Billy Burnette, Johnny Christopher) – 4:05
9. "Let’s Forget That We’re Married" (Lewis, Stewart, Tackett) – 2:39
10. "She Sings Amazing Grace" (Jerry Foster, Bill Rice) – 2:49
