= I'm a Texan =

Studio album by Gary Stewart
- Released: October 15, 1993
- Genre: Country
- Label: HighTone
- Producer: Roy Dea

Gary Stewart chronology
| Gary's Greatest (1991) | I'm a Texan (1993) | The Essential Gary Stewart (1997) |

I'm a Texan is an album by the American musician Gary Stewart, released in 1993. Stewart was born in Kentucky and resided in Florida; the album title is an acknowledgement of his popularity in Texas. Governor Ann Richards declared Stewart an honorary Texan after the release of the album. He supported it with a North American tour.

== Production ==
Recorded in Nashville, the album was produced by Roy Dea. Tracy Nelson provided harmony and backing vocals on some of the tracks. "It's True" is the only song written for the album by Stewart. "One Night" is a cover of the song made famous by Elvis Presley. "Draggin' Leather" was written by Mickey Newbury. "Dark End of the Street" is an interpretation of the James Carr song. "Those Memories" is a cover of the song most associated with Bill Monroe. "Honky Tonk Hardwood Floor" was written by Johnny Horton. Charlie McCoy played harmonica on "Stompin' Grounds".

== Critical reception ==
Professional ratings
Review scores
| Source | Rating |
|---|---|
| AllMusic | 3/5 stars |
| Lincoln Journal Star | 4/5 stars |
| Orlando Sentinel | 5/5 stars |
| The Philadelphia Inquirer | 3.5/4 stars |

The Orlando Sentinel opined that "Stewart's mile-wide vibrato, rich tone and soulful phrasing are as affecting as ever." The Los Angeles Times said that "what defines Stewart's vision of country—beyond his signature spine-tingling vocal quaver—is his willingness to travel the highway of hurt, and face the pain of living here in the real world." Rolling Stone noted that "much of the material finds Stewart's quaver in its usual shot-and-beer setting (where his voice sounds like hands shaking after too much whiskey)".

The Dallas Morning News stated that "Stewart's quivering voice, so fragile and steamy, is not a pretty thing... But then neither are the subjects he sings about: alcoholism, infidelity, sorrow and regret." The Gazette called the album "a solid package of country-rockers, honky tonkers and weepers." The Fresno Bee labeled it "high-octane honky-tonk", and considered it one of 1993's best country albums.

In 1999, Dave McElfresh of Tucson Weekly listed I'm a Texan as the seventh best "low selling" album of the 1990s.

== Track listing ==
| No. | Title | Length |
|---|---|---|
| 1. | "Come On In" | 2:51 |
| 2. | "I'm a Texan" | 2:50 |
| 3. | "Stompin' Grounds" | 3:50 |
| 4. | "Hand Me Another" | 3:18 |
| 5. | "Draggin' Leather" | 3:56 |
| 6. | "It's True" | 4:07 |
| 7. | "Honky Tonk Hardwood Floor" | 2:52 |
| 8. | "Dark End of the Street" | 4:24 |
| 9. | "Make It a Double" | 3:07 |
| 10. | "One Night" | 3:38 |
| 11. | "Those Memories" | 4:25 |
| 12. | "Two More Fools" | 3:46 |
