= I Can Smell That Funky Music =

Single by Eric Mercury

from the album Funky Sounds Nurtured in the Fertile Soil of Memphis That Smell of Rock
- B-side: "Listen With Your Eyes"
- Released: 1971
- Genre: soul
- Length: 3:00
- Label: Enterprise ENA-9041
- Songwriters: Rice, Floyd, Cropper
- Producer: Steve Cropper

Eric Mercury singles chronology
| "Everybody Has The Right To Love" (1970) | "I Can Smell That Funky Music" (1971) | "What's Usual Seems Natr'l" (1972) |

"I Can Smell That Funky Music" was a hit in 1972 for soul singer Eric Mercury. This was the first time he had a single of his own in the charts. Recorded and produced in the United States, the success of the single was in Canada where Mercury was originally from.

== Background ==
The song was written by Steve Cropper, Mack Rice and Eddie Floyd. The opening song for one of two albums produced by Steve Cropper for Stax Records at his new TMI studio, it was a song that fused elements of roots and soul. It was one of Canada's biggest hits of 1972.

The single was released in Canada on Enterprise ENA 9041 around the time that Allan Katz, the national promotional director of Polydor had taken Mercury on a cross-country tour, visiting stations from Toronto to Vancouver to promote his new album, Funky Sounds Nurtured in the Fertile Soil of Memphis That Smell of Rock.

== Chart performance ==
By December 18, Cashbox were calling it a national breakout. Roy Hennessy of CKLG had chart action predictions for the song. Mercury's album was also getting heavy airplay on some FM stations. By December 25, 1971, the song was predicted to reach the top 60 of the Billboard Hot Hundred Chart. It was already at #40 on the RPM100 singles chart. By the end of the year, the single was at #12 on the CKVN 1410 Top 40 chart. It eventually peaked at number 30 in Canada on January 15, 1972.
