= Out of Hand =

Studio album by Gary Stewart
- Released: 1975
- Genre: Country, honky tonk
- Length: 27:25
- Label: RCA Victor
- Producer: Roy Dea

Gary Stewart chronology
You're Not the Woman You Used to Be (1973)	Out of Hand (1975)	Steppin' Out (1976)

Out of Hand is a 1975 honky tonk album by country music singer Gary Stewart. The singer's second album, his debut for RCA Records, reached #6 on Billboard's Country Albums chart, launching three charting singles, "Drinkin' Thing" (#10), "Out of Hand" (#4), and "She's Actin' Single (I'm Drinkin' Doubles)" (#1). The album, a departure from prevalent country styles at the time of its release, was a critical as well as a commercial success and has come to be regarded as a classic in the honky tonk genre.

== Background ==
Stewart had already abandoned Nashville when RCA's producer Roy Dea heard him on a demo tape and approached him about making the album. Dea partnered Stewart in the studio with a number of well-established country musicians, but focused them on the honky tonk Southern rock that Stewart preferred. The resultant album, Out of Hand, was released in 1975, Stewart's RCA debut.

== Reception ==
Professional ratings
Review scores
Source	Rating
AllMusic	5/5 stars
Christgau's Record Guide	A−

The album launched three charting singles. The titular song, "Out of Hand," reached #4 on the "Country Singles" chart. "Drinkin' Thing" and "She's Actin' Single (I'm Drinkin' Doubles)," two tracks penned by Grammy Award winning Wayne Carson, reached #10 and #1 respectively. The album itself was a strong seller, climbing to #6 on Billboard's "Country Albums" chart.

In addition to being commercially successfully, the album was, like all of Stewart's early work, critically well received. The year after the album's release, Time said that "all three of his albums have been gushed over by critics". Village Voice critic Robert Christgau said "the wild urgency of Stewart's voice reminds me of both Hank Williams and Jerry Lee Lewis, communicating an unrestraint that feels genuinely liberating even when Stewart himself sounds miserable." Rolling Stone gave it high praise as well, stating at the time of its release that "[w]ith practitioners like Stewart around, honky-tonk—and rockabilly—may not be dead yet" and, in a later review, describing it as a "formidable deadpan triumph". AllMusic in its review declares it "indispensable for roots music fans of any stripe."

== Genre ==
The album is particularly prized within the honky tonk genre, regarded as a classic by a master of the genre. A year after its release, Stewart would be dubbed by Time "the current king of honkytonk". AllMusic calls it "the separate but equal third element" — with Back to the Barrooms by Merle Haggard and Honky Tonk Masquerade by Joe Ely — in forming "honky tonk's unholy trinity". Rough Guides' volume on country music declares the album "a brilliantly conceived chunk of country that stands as one of the finest honky-tonk records ever cut in Nashville", while country music critic Bill Malone went broader in calling Out of Hand "one of the greatest honky-tonk country albums ever recorded."

The album, like Stewart's live performances, had crossover appeal. Christgau characterized the album as "the best regular issue country LP I've heard in about five years", which he noted "may just mean that it's barely a country record at all." According to Nashville Scene, Stewart "updated the hillbilly existentialism of Hank Williams for the rock ’n’ roll era." The Encyclopedia of Country Music attributes Stewart's appeal to rock critics, as well as to younger music fans, to his "loud and wild" albums and concerts, but adds that these "made the Nashville establishment wary", with the country music industry at the time of the album's release focused on musicians like Olivia Newton-John and John Denver. In its obituary, CMT staunchly declared him "simultaneously more country than most country artists of his time and more of a staunch, down-and-dirty Southern rocker than almost all of the Southern rockers."

== Track listing ==
=== Side one ===
1. "Drinkin' Thing" (Wayne Carson) – 2:57
2. "Honky Tonkin'" (Troy Seals, Don Goodman, John Bettis, Dave Gillon) – 2:42
3. "I See the Want To in Your Eyes" (Carson) – 2:38
4. "This Old Heart Won't Let Go" (Jimmie Helms) – 2:30
5. "Draggin' Shackles" (Gary Stewart, Nat Stuckey) – 2:25

=== Side two ===
1. "She's Actin' Single (I'm Drinkin' Doubles)" (Carson) – 2:46
2. "Back Sliders Wine" (Michael Martin Murphey) – 2:59
3. "Sweet Country Red" (Seals, Goodman) – 2:31
4. "Out of Hand" (Jeff Barry, Tom Jans) – 2:47
5. "Williamson County" (Gary Stewart, Mary Lou Stewart, Rick Durrett) – 3:10

== Personnel ==
=== Performance ===
- Harold Bradley – guitar, bass guitar
- David Briggs – piano
- Jerry Carrigan – drums
- Pete Drake – steel guitar
- Ray Edenton – guitar
- Buddy Harman – drums
- John Hughey – steel guitar
- Jim Isbell – drums
- The Jordanaires – vocals, backing vocals
- Charlie McCoy – harmonica
- Bob Moore – double bass
- Weldon Myrick – steel guitar
- The Nashville Edition – vocals, backing vocals
- Hargus "Pig" Robbins – piano
- Dale Sellers – electric guitar
- Jerry Shook – guitar
- Jerry Stembridge – guitar
- Gary Stewart – guitar, piano, vocals
- Henry Strzelecki – bass
- Tommy Williams – fiddle
- Bobby Wood – piano
- Reggie Young – electric guitar

=== Production ===
- Jerry Bradley – liner notes
- Herb Burnette – art direction, photography
- Roy Dea – producer
- Bill Vandevort – engineer

== Charts ==
=== Weekly charts ===
Chart (1975)	Peak position
US Top Country Albums (Billboard)	6

=== Year-end charts ===
Chart (1975)	Position
US Top Country Albums (Billboard)	18
