= Battleground (Gary Stewart album) =

Studio album by Gary Stewart
- Released: 1990
- Studio: Music City Music Hall (Nashville, Tennessee)
- Genre: Country
- Label: HighTone
- Producer: Roy Dea

Gary Stewart chronology
Brand New (1988)	Battleground (1990)	Gary's Greatest (1991)

Battleground is an album by the American musician Gary Stewart, released in 1990. It was his second album for HighTone Records. The album was more commercially successful than his 1988 comeback, Brand New.

== Production ==
The album was produced by Roy Dea. "Let's Go Jukin'" was written with Dickey Betts. "You're the Reason I'm Living" is a cover of the Bobby Darin song. "Nothin' but a Woman" is a cover of the Robert Cray song.

== Critical reception ==
Professional ratings
Review scores
Source	Rating
AllMusic	2.5/5 stars
Chicago Tribune	3/4 stars
Robert Christgau	B+
The Encyclopedia of Popular Music	3/5 stars
The Rolling Stone Album Guide	3/5 stars

The Boston Globe wrote that "the album dwarfs much of today's country radio fare—and Stewart is a true master at work." The Chicago Tribune called the album "a convincing illustration of why Stewart is a king of that increasingly rare breed: the honky-tonkers." The Dallas Morning News noted that Battleground "has a raw, hollow, sound that immediately conjures up a dark bar."

The Buffalo News determined that, "scratchy and scrawny as his voice is, there is something quite compelling about the way this country/blues/rock veteran puts across a song." The Fresno Bee listed "Nothin' but a Woman" as the second best country cover song of 1990. Robert Christgau concluded that Stewart's "r&r groove is sharp-witted where Steve Earle's is muscle-headed and the average Nashville cat's just mechanical."

== Track listing ==
No.	Title	Length
1.	"Nothin' but a Woman"	4:03
2.	"Bedroom Battleground"	3:09
3.	"Let's Go Jukin'"	2:30
4.	"Nothing Cheap About a Cheap Affair"	3:12
5.	"Ol' Hank's Lovesick Blues"	3:04
6.	"Woman in Demand"	2:57
7.	"Hey Leona"	3:02
8.	"You're the Reason I'm Living"	3:37
9.	"Delia"	2:42
10.	"Seeing's Believing"	2:46
