= Little Junior (album) =

Studio album by Gary Stewart
- Released: 1978
- Genre: Country
- Label: RCA Victor
- Producer: Roy Dea

Gary Stewart chronology
Your Place or Mine (1977)	Little Junior (1978)	Gary (1979)

Little Junior is an album by the American musician Gary Stewart, released in 1978. It peaked at No. 35 on Billboard's Top Country Albums chart. The first single was "Whiskey Trip". Stewart supported the album with a North American tour.

== Production ==
The album was produced by Roy Dea. Stewart wrote the title track and "Single Again". "I Got Mine" is a cover of the Ry Cooder version of the 1902 song. Josh Graves played dobro on the cover of the Marshall Tucker Band's "Can't You See". "Honky-Tonkin'" is a cover of the Hank Williams song. The Jordanaires and Linda Hargrove provided backing vocals on the album.

== Critical reception ==
Professional ratings
Review scores
Source	Rating
AllMusic	3/5 stars
Robert Christgau	B
The New Rolling Stone Record Guide	3/5 stars

Robert Christgau wrote that Stewart is "secure by now in his good-humored bad-old-boy persona." The Commercial Appeal said that "Stewart's quavering voice is the type that calls for neon beer signs, cheap checkered tablecloths and either a broken heart or a lusty gleam." The Dayton Daily News noted that "a million-dollar studio can do a lot for a voice."

The Kansas City Star praised the title track, but opined that "Stewart needs to decide whether he's going to sound like an honest-to-goodness honky-tonker or whether he's going to drift into the Nashville-sound trap." The Boston Globe called Stewart's voice "a devastating instrument, drenched with emotion and a dual capacity to convey suffering and boiled-up craziness." The Citizen deemed Little Junior "funky, country-blues [with] tough guitars and fat-back drums."

AllMusic wrote that "Stewart's aching warble adds new dimensions to shopworn generalizations, often evoking compassion for decidedly unsympathetic characters."

== Track listing ==
No.	Title	Length
1.	"Whiskey Trip"
2.	"Little Junior"
3.	"Stone Wall (Around Your Heart)"
4.	"Can't You See"
5.	"Single Again"
6.	"Tequila After Midnight"
7.	"I Got Mine"
8.	"If My Eyes Touch You"
9.	"Honky-Tonkin'"
10.	"You're Running Wild"
