= 20 of the Best =

20 of the Best was a 1980s series of compilation albums by RCA Records and may refer to:

- 20 of the Best (Gary Stewart album), 1984
- 20 of the Best (Willie Nelson album), 1982
- 20 of the Best, by Chet Atkins, 1986
- 20 of the Best, by The Browns, 1985
- 20 of the Best, by Floyd Cramer, 1982
