= Randy Gurley =

- Born: Circa 1963; Salem, Massachusetts
- Genre: Country
- Occupation: Singer
- Years active: 1970s
- Labels: ABC, RCA

Randy Gurley is an American country singer who performed in the US and the UK. She had several hits on the US country charts from 1977 to 1979. She recorded for the ABC and RCA labels. She is most likely remembered for her version of "True Love Ways".

== Background ==
Randy Gurley was recognized within the music industry before she had a hit on the charts. ABC's decision to sign with Gurley deviated from their normal trend of refusing to sign artists without a single. Jim Foglesong, who was ABC's president in Nashville, felt that Gurley had a unique talent that could go far. With this recognition, Gurley released an album and a single almost at the same time.

She was born circa 1963 in Salem, Massachusetts, and grew up in Maine and California. She was singing from the age of sixteen. She apparently was on the verge of giving up singing. However, she borrowed money and headed to Dallas to stay with a friend and try to get her career going. It was there that she came into contact with a young public relations specialist called David Van Cronkhite. He is the man who was credited with discovering her. It was Cronkhite who took her to see veteran producer Owen Bradley and have him interested in producing her as an artist. He then took her to Tulsa where she met Jim Halsey to get him interested in handling her career.

Gurley's hits include "True Love Ways" in 1977 and "Don't Treat Me Like a Stranger" and "If I Ever", both in 1979. She was a Cash Box Country Album place Winner (New Female Vocalists section) in 1978 and a Country Music Magazine Bullet Award runner up the following year.

She was on the ABC Nashville roster that also included Thom Bresh, Roy Clark, John Conlee, Narvel Felts, Freddy Fender, Barbara Mandrell, The Oak Ridge Boys and Tommy Overstreet etc. She was also a touring support act for The Oak Ridge Boys. She had also hired Vickie Carrico as her backing singer.

As of July 1977, Randy Gurley was being managed by DVC, Inc. headed by David Van Cronkhite.

== Career ==
=== 1977 ===
Randy Gurley recorded the Carol Bayer Sager / David Wolfer song "Heartbreaker" which was produced by Harold Bradley. Backed with "Louisville", it was released on ABC/Dot 17728 in 1977. It was a recommended single in the Country section of the November 12 issue of Billboard.

According to the December 9, 1977 issue of Radio & Records, her single was added to the playlist of KLAK in Denver, Colorado.

=== 1978 ===
On February 14, 1978, Randy Gurley was set to headline at her first major show at the Palomino club in North Hollywood.

Gurley's performance at the Palomino Club was reviewed by Patricia Thomas in the March 11, 1978 issue of Cash Box. Thomas wrote that after the support acts, Gurley came bounding across the dance floor then on to the stage. She started off with the song "Southland" which was described as a rock stomping tribute to the southern neighbors. Thomas said that it was a well-chosen kick off for the set of songs which were written or performed by artists such as the Eagles, Bonnie Raitt and JD Souther. It was the cover of Souther's "Faithless Love" which was singled out as a fine performance. Some songs from Gurley's forthcoming album were also performed. In addition to saying that Gurley's 5 feet 1 inch of unaffected personality and vocal style mix well, Gurley's clear voice as her outstanding feature and her cross-over potential was also noted.

==== Let Me Be the One (album) ====
Gurley's debut album Let Me Be the One which was produced by Harold Bradley and Jim Foglesong was released in 1978 on ABC AB-1067. It was reviewed in the May 6 issue of Cash Box with the reviewer saying that it bursts with smooth professionalism. The consistency of the material was also noted. The picks were the title song which was referred to as a standout and JD Souther's "Faithless Love" and Steve Young's "Old Memories Mean Nothing to Me". The reviewer predicted a long line of her albums to follow.

Three songs from the album were recommended by The Gavin Report in the publication's April 28 issue. They were "Only Diamonds Are Forever", "Faithless Love" and "Old Memories".

==== "Let Me Be the One" (single) ====
The single "Let Me Be the One" was released on ABC AB-12347. It was reviewed by Record World in the magazine's April 1 issue. It was one of the two Country Picks of the Week, the other being "Two More Bottles of Wine" by Emmylou Harris. The reviewer referred to Gurley's song as pleasant and easy-going and it would go well with the coming of the spring season. According to The Country Column in the April 15 issue of Cash Box, the song had been chosen by American Airlines for all of their aircraft's in-flight stereo music programming.

Further activities

During July, she was appearing at the Park Tahoe Hotel in Stateline, NV and was set to wrap up her month-long engagement on the 30th. The next day she was to commence her week-long engagement at the Caravan East, in Albuquerque, NM.

==== "True Love Ways" ====
Gurley recorded the Buddy Holly and Norman Petty composition "True Love Ways" which was released on ABC AB -12392 in 1978. It was one of the "Singles to Watch in the July 22 issue of Cash Box.

On the week of September 23, 1978, her song "True Love Ways" entered the Record World Country Singles Chart at no. 92. It peaked at no. 90 the following week. It also made it to no. 77 on the Billboard Country chart.

Further activities in 1978

It was reported by Cash Box in the magazine's October 21 issue that Gurley and Roy Head had been in Plymouth, England headlining the first country show with ten to follow. It was for the Westward Television. They had recently returned to the United States.

With Bonnie Tyler at no. 1, Stella Parton at no. 2, Mary K. Miller at no. 3 and Susie Allanson at no. 5, Gurley came no. 4 in the New Female Vocalists section of the 1978 Cash Box Country Album Winners Poll which was published the magazine's December 30 issue.

=== 1979 ===
==== "Don't Treat Me Like a Stranger" ====
It was reported by Cash Box in the June 30, 1979 issue that Cliff Cochran, Randy Gurley and Mary K. Miller were three artists that had been signed to the RCA label. Her single "Don't Treat Me Like a Stranger" had been released on RCA JH-11611 earlier that month. It was written by Dave Loggins and produced by Roy Dea. It was one of the Billboard Top Picks in the Country section. On the week ending the song debuted in the Billboard Hot Country Singles chart at no. 98. It peaked at no. 97 the following week.

Further activities

It was reported by Record World in the October 13, 1979 issue that Gurley and fellow RCA newcomer Steve Wariner had recently performed at LA's Palamino Club.

According to Record World Country Hotline columnist Marie Ratliff in the October 27 issue, Gurley's song "If I Ever" was getting good attention on radio stations, WWVA, KERE, KSOP, WWNC, WNYN, WBAM, and WSLC. It made its debut on the Billboard Hot Country chart for the week ending October 27, 1979. It spent three weeks in the chart, peaking at no. 92.

=== 1980s ===
Gurley was mentioned in the Nashville Scene column of the July 4, 1981 issue of Billboard. It said to the readers if they were wondering what happened to Randy Gurley and then mentioned that she was back in the studio the next month with Norbert Putman a well-known pop producer. There was no indication of what direction Gurley would take musically. It was mentioned in the paragraph that with her voice, no matter what direction, the finished product would be commercial.

== Discography ==
Singles
Act	Release	Catalogue	Year	Notes
Randy Gurley	"Heartbreaker" / "Louisville"	ABC, Dot DO-17728	1977	
Randy Gurley	"Let Me Be the One" / "Faithless Love"	ABC AB-12347	1978	
Randy Gurley	"True Love Ways" / "I'll Never Get Over Loving You"	ABC AB-12392	1978	
Randy Gurley	"Don't Treat Me Like a Stranger" / "Every Night"	RCA PB-11611	1979	
Randy Gurley	"If I Ever" / "How Long"	RCA PB-11726	1979	

Album
Act	Release	Catalogue	Year	Notes
Randy Gurley	Let Me Be the One	ABC AB-1067	1978	
