= If I Ever (Otha Young song) =

"If I Ever" is a song that was composed by Otha Young. It was recorded by Juice Newton & Silver Spur and included on their album in 1976. In 1979, the song was recorded by Randy Gurley and released as a single. It became a minor hit for her on the country chart that year.

== Background ==
The song appears on side one of the 1976 album After the Dust Settles by Juice Newton & Silver Spur. The composer, Otha Young, played on the album as well. Juice Newton & Silver Spur also released the song as a promo single.

== Randy Gurley version ==
"If I Ever"

Song by Randy Gurley
- B-side: "How Long"
- Released: September 1979
- Length: 3:16
- Label: RCA
- Songwriter(s): Otha Young
- Producer(s): Roy Dea

Randy Gurley singles chronology
"Don't Treat Me Like a Stranger" (1979)	"If I Ever" (1979)

=== History ===
Randy Gurley recorded the song with Roy Dea handling the production. It was backed with the Jonathan Edwards composition "How Long" and released on RCA Records in September 1979.

=== Reception ===
The single was a Country Single Pick in the September 29, 1979, issue of Record World. The reviewer noted the slow and easy start of the song with it then building into the chorus. Gurley's expressive style was noted with the reviewer saying that it could be her strongest single. It was a recommended record in the Billboard Top Single Picks for the week ending September 29, 1979. It was also a Single to Watch in the October 6 issue of Cash Box.

=== Airplay ===
According to the October 12 issue of Radio & Records, her single was added to the playlist of WBAM in Montgomery, Alabama. In Marie Ratliff's Country Hotline column on the October 27 issue of Record World, it was shown that the single was getting good attention at various radio stations across the United States.

=== Charts ===
The song made its debut on the Billboard Hot Country chart the week ending October 27, 1979. It spent three weeks on the chart, peaking at no. 92.

=== Subsequent versions ===
UK country pop singer Barbara Allen recorded a version which appeared on her album, Staying Power, released by Hawk Records in 1986.
