= Rocky (song) =

1975 song written by Jay Stevens

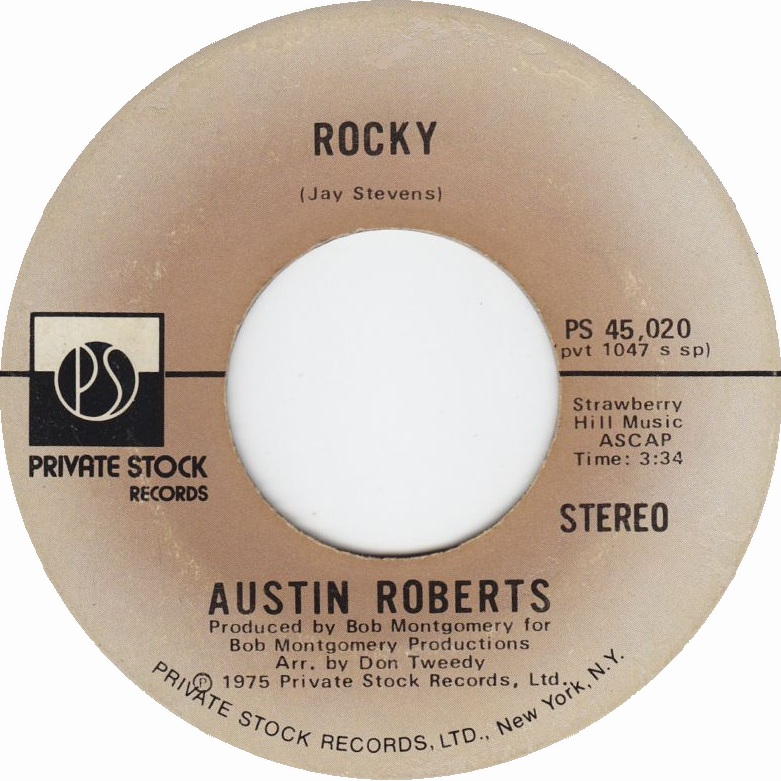
- Side A of the original US single

Single by Austin Roberts

from the album Rocky
- B-side: "You Got the Power"
- Released: May 19, 1975
- Genre: Pop
- Length: 3:34
- Label: Private Stock
- Songwriter: Jay Stevens
- Producer: Bob Montgomery

Austin Roberts singles chronology
"I'd Rather Be with You" (1974)	"Rocky" (1975)	"Children of the Rain" (1975)

Audio
- "Rocky" on YouTube

"Rocky" is a song written by Ronald Johnson (under the moniker Jay Stevens, a.k.a. Woody P. Snow) and performed by American singer Austin Roberts. It was released in May 1975 as the lead single and title track from his studio album of the same name which was released in October 1975. It was an international success, reaching Number 1 in South Africa, as well as being a moderate hit in the UK, reaching Number 22 on the UK Singles chart, his only chart appearance there. The song has also spawned multiple successful cover versions, including a Country version by Dickey Lee three months later as the fifth single from his album of the same name, which was a North American Top 10 country hit, where it peaked at Number 1 on the US Country Charts, as well as two successful foreign-language adaptations in Europe the following year, in German by Frank Farian (which was Number 1 in West Germany and a crossover hit in Dutchophone markets, where it was a Top 10 hit in the Netherlands and a moderate hit in Dutch Belgium), and in Dutch by Don Mercedes (based on Farian's German adaptation, where in both the Netherlands and Dutch-speaking Belgium out-charted Farian's version at Number 1).

== Content ==
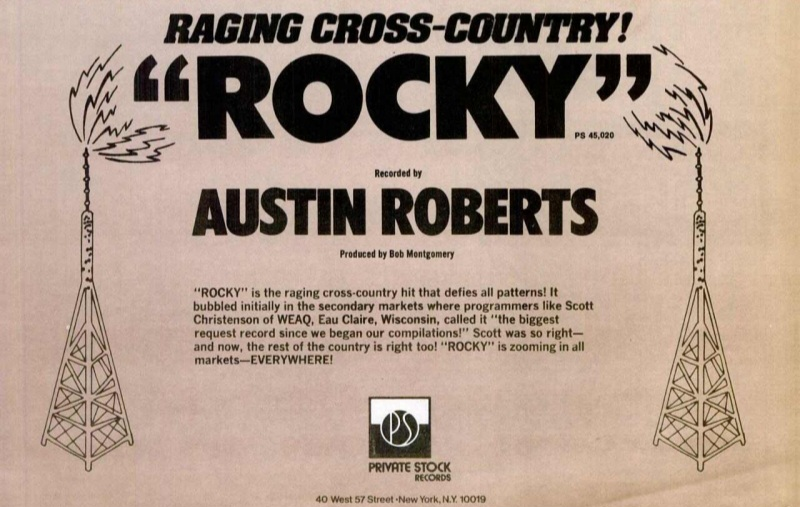
Trade ad for the single, 1975

In a paradoxically upbeat melody in a major key, Rocky, the title protagonist, tells the tragic story of his young wife in first person. He first recalls the day four years earlier where, as an 18-year-old college student, he met his wife-to-be (unnamed in the song) and recalls how well they hit it off. She accepts Rocky's marriage proposal, and they spend the next several months fixing up an old house to make their home. The two soon learn they are expecting their first child, a girl.

Although the family has its usual problems, the happy memories outweigh the bad. One example is a particularly rambunctious first birthday party for the couple's daughter. With things going well and the family settling in on a content life, Rocky soon gets devastating news: his wife has been diagnosed with an apparently inoperable illness — the specific illness is unidentified in the song — and that she has only a short time to live.

All of this is told in flashback, as in the final verse, his young wife has died. Rocky is now a widower and raising his daughter alone. He feels a sense of sadness every time he looks at his daughter, who strongly resembles her mother, and now doing the same things alone that he once did with his wife. However, he feels a sense of hope, with his wife looking down on him and the couple's daughter and reassures that his love for her will always remain safe.

Each of the first three verses — telling one of the chapters in the couple's life — ends with the woman having a sense of fear of the unknown, expressed through the refrain's statement, "Rocky, I've never…," followed by the appropriate follow-up ("been in love before," "had a baby before," "had to die before") and the unassured, "Don't know if I can do it." However, both he and she realize that the strength they have in each other can help them meet each challenge head on. At the end, Rocky says that "if the world would end, your love is safe with me." The fourth refrain has Rocky envisioning hearing his deceased wife reassure, "Rocky, you know that you've been alone before, you know that you can do it," and that in her own way, she can still advise him in his time of need.

== Chart performance ==
Chart (1975)	Peak position
Australia Kent Music Report	25
Canada RPM Top Singles	10
Canada RPM Adult Contemporary	20
Ireland (IRMA)	13
New Zealand (RIANZ)	38
South Africa (Springbok)	1
UK Singles Chart	22
US Billboard Hot 100	9
US Billboard Easy Listening	22
US Cash Box Top 100	11

=== Year-end charts ===
Chart (1975)	Rank
Australia	190
Canada	93
U.S. (Joel Whitburn's Pop Annual)	100

Chart (1976)	Rank
South Africa	16

== Dickey Lee version ==
"Rocky"
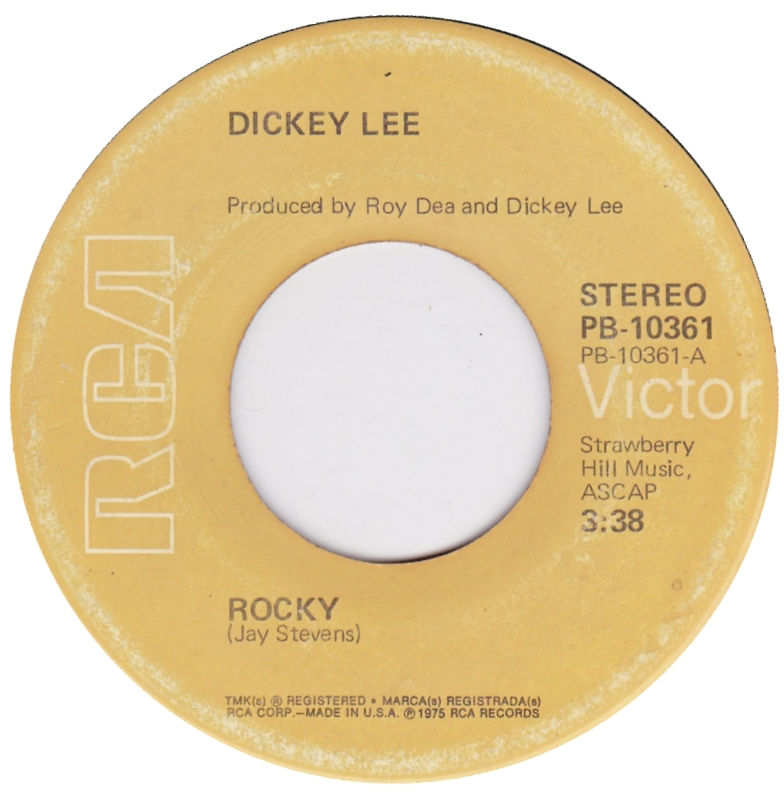
- Side A of the original US single

Single by Dickey Lee

from the album Rocky
- B-side: "The Closest Thing to You"
- Released: August 1975
- Recorded: July 11, 1975
- Genre: Country
- Length: 3:38
- Label: RCA
- Songwriter: Jay Stevens
- Producers: Roy Dea; Dickey Lee

Dickey Lee singles chronology
"The Door is Always Open" (1975)	"Rocky" (1975)	"Angels, Roses and Rain" (1976)

Audio
- "Rocky" on YouTube

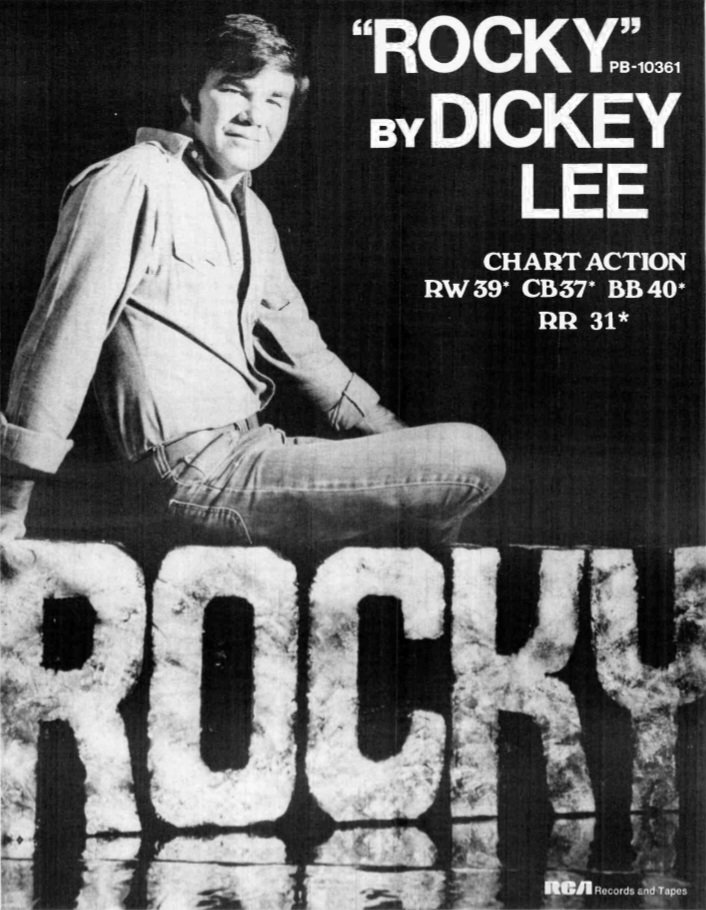
Trade ad for Lee's version, 1975

Two months after Roberts' original, on July 11, 1975, country singer-songwriter Dickey Lee recorded a version of the song, where it would be released as a single the following month, the fifth overall single and title track from his album of the same name which was released that September, where it was a North American Top 10 country hit, peaking at Number 1 on the US Country Charts and Number 9 on the Canadian Country charts. Lee also performed his version on the American country music television program Pop! Goes the Country on February 7, 1976.

=== Charts ===
Chart (1975)	Peak position
US Hot Country Songs (Billboard)	1
US Cash Box Top 100 Country	1
US Country Singles (Record World)	1
US Country (Radio & Records)	1
Canada RPM Country Tracks	9

== Frank Farian version ==
"Rocky"
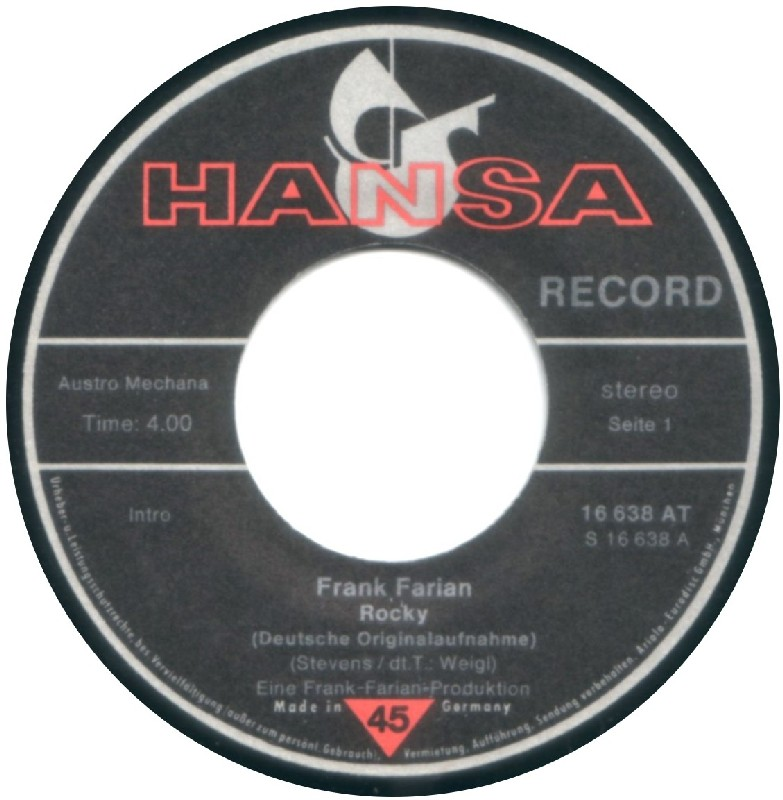
- Side A of the original West German single

Single by Frank Farian

from the album Rocky
- Language: German
- B-side: "Am Samstagabend"
- Released: February 1976
- Recorded: Late 1975
- Genre: Schlager
- Length: 4:00
- Label: Hansa
- Songwriters: Jay Stevens; Hans-Ulrich Weigel
- Producer: Frank Farian

Frank Farian singles chronology
"Cara mia bleib" (1975)	"Rocky" (1976)	"Spring über deinen Schatten, Tommy" (1976)

Music video
- "Rocky" (Disco, 1976) on YouTube

In early 1976, the song was covered by West German schlager singer and record producer Frank Farian, and adapted into the German language by Hans-Ulrich Weigel, now featuring uncredited female vocals in the chorus for quoting the wife and daughter (both Roberts' and Lee's recordings feature them singing from all perspectives despite being male), with Farian singing from the titular protagonist's perspective, and was released as the third single and title track from Farian's 1976 studio album of the same name, and was a success, mainly in German-speaking markets and a crossover hit in Dutch-speaking markets, where it reached Number 1 in Farian's native West Germany, Number 2 in Austria, Number 3 in Switzerland, Number 6 in the Netherlands, and a moderate hit at Number 28 in Dutch Belgium. Farian mimed his version on the West German television program Disco on March 27, 1976 and on the Dutch program TopPop on May 14, 1976.

=== Charts ===
Chart (1976)	Peak position
Switzerland (Singles Top 100)	3
West Germany (GfK)	1
Austria (Ö3)	2
Netherlands (Single Top 100)	6
Belgium (Ultratop 50 Flanders)	28

== Don Mercedes version ==
"Rocky"
- Netherlands single sleeve

Single by Don Mercedes
- Language: Dutch
- B-side: "Melanie"
- Released: April 13, 1976
- Recorded: Early 1976
- Genre: Pop; schlager
- Length: 4:07
- Label: Philips
- Songwriters: Jay Stevens; Hans-Ulrich Weigel; C.A.R. Pano
- Producers: Peter Koelewijn; Will Hoebee

Don Mercedes singles chronology
"Stuck on You" (1975)	"Rocky" (1976)	"Dan ben ik thuis" (1976)

Bonnie St. Claire singles chronology
"Een heel gelukkig kerstfeest" (1975)	"Rocky" (1976)	"Dokter Bernhard" (1976)

Music video
- "Rocky" (TopPop, 1976) on YouTube

In early 1976, Dutch record executives Peter Koelewijn and Will Hoebee heard Farian's then-newly-released German adaptation of "Rocky" and decided to adapt the song into the Dutch language. The Dutch lyrics were written by John Eshuis under the pseudonym C.A.R. Pano. They decided to have the choruses of their version sung by a female vocalist as well; like Farian's German adaptation that was a crossover hit in the Dutch-speaking world, and was performed by Dutch singer Robert Bommel, known professionally as Don Mercedes. They chose Bonnie St. Claire for the female vocals (of whom was uncredited on the original release), while the male vocals were sung by Mercedes, in the key of Lee's version. This version would be released as a non-album single by Mercedes that April. Mercedes' version peaked at Number 1 in both the Netherlands and Dutch Belgium (Flanders) that year, out-charting Farian's German adaptation that served as the basis for Mercedes' version. Mercedes mimed his version of the song on the Dutch music program TopPop on May 22, 1976.

=== Charts ===
Chart (1976)	Peak position
Netherlands (Single Top 100)	1
Belgium (Ultratop 50 Flanders)	1

== Other notable versions ==
- In Late 2004, based on the Dutch-language version by Mercedes, the Dutch novelty duo Bad Brothers (consisting of Frank Hoek and Nol Roos) released a Dance music version of the song as a non-album single, which was a minor hit in the Netherlands into early 2005 and peaked at Number 57 on the Dutch Single Top 100.
- In February 2009, another Dutch-language dance music version based on the Bad Brothers arrangement was released as a non-album single, performed by Dutch singers Addie Timmermans and Jolanda van de Wetering, which was again a minor hit in the Netherlands, peaking at Number 36 on the Single Top 100 in May 2009.
