= Mack Rice =

American singer-songwriter (1933–2016)

- Also known as: Sir Mack Rice
- Born: Bonny Rice; November 10, 1933; Clarksdale, Mississippi, U.S.
- Died: June 27, 2016 (aged 82) Detroit, Michigan, U.S.
- Occupations: Singer, songwriter
- Formerly of: The Falcons

Bonny "Mack" Rice (November 10, 1933 – June 27, 2016), sometimes credited as Sir Mack Rice, was an American songwriter and singer. His best-known composition and biggest hit as a solo performer was "Mustang Sally". He also wrote "Respect Yourself" with Luther Ingram.

== Life and career ==
Rice was born in Clarksdale, Mississippi. In 1950, his family moved to Detroit, Michigan, where he began his work in the R&B field, performing with the Five Scalders in 1956. From 1957–63, he performed with the Falcons, a group whose members included Eddie Floyd, Wilson Pickett and Joe Stubbs. He performed as a solo vocalist in the years to follow, but his biggest successes were as songwriter for other artists on labels like Stax and others in the 1960s and following decades. He began his solo vocalist career at Stax in 1967, recording on Atco Records beginning in 1968. Rice is one of the few musicians whose career touched both Motown and Stax Records.

As a solo recording artist, he had two chart hits: "Mustang Sally", which reached number 15 on the Billboard R&B chart in 1965, and "Coal Man", which reached number 48 on the soul music chart in 1969.

== Songwriter ==
Rice's biggest success was as a songwriter. Besides "Mustang Sally", which also became a major hit for Wilson Pickett in 1966, and "Respect Yourself", a hit for the Staple Singers, his other songs include "Betcha Can't Kiss Me (Just One Time)", "Cheaper to Keep Her", "Cadillac Assembly Line", "Money Talks", "Cold Women With Warm Hearts", "Do the Funky Penguin, Pt. 1", "It Sho Ain't Me", and "Santa Claus Wants Some Lovin'". His compositions have been performed by many well-known artists, including the Staple Singers, Ike and Tina Turner, Albert King, Johnnie Taylor, Joe Cocker, Shirley Brown, Rufus Thomas, Etta James, Billy Eckstine, Eddie Floyd, Buddy Guy, The Rascals, The Kingsmen, Wilson Pickett, Albert Collins, Busta Rhymes, Lynyrd Skynyrd, Otis Clay and The Blues Brothers (in Blues Brothers 2000).

=== Chart hits and other notable songs written by Mack Rice ===
Year	Song	Original artist	^{U.S. Pop}	^{U.S. R&B}	^{UK Singles Chart}	Other notable versions, and notes
1963	"Take This Love I've Got"	The Falcons	-	-	-	Written by Eddie Floyd, Mack Rice, and Wilson Pickett
1965	"Mustang Sally"	Mack Rice	-	15	-	1966: Wilson Pickett, #23 US, #6 R&B
1966	""Betcha Can't Kiss Me (Just One Time)"	Ike & Tina Turner	-	-	-	
1967	"Got to Be On (The Case)"	Johnnie Mae Matthews	-	-	-	Written by Mack Rice, Johnny Gibson, and Carlis Monroe
1967	"I Call You Lover But You Ain't Nothin' But a Tramp"	Margie Hendrix	-	-	-	
1967	"Sophisticated Sissy"	Rufus Thomas	-	43	-	Written by Isaac Hayes, David Porter, Mack Rice, and Joe Shamwell
1968	"The Memphis Train"	Rufus Thomas	-	-	-	Written by Rufus Thomas, Mack Rice, and Willie Sparks
1968	"You Got to Change (Your Evil Ways)"	Leah Dawson	-	-	-	
1969	"Coal Man"	Mack Rice	-	48	-	
1971	"Blood is Thicker Than Water"	Eddie Floyd	-	33	-	Written by Steve Cropper, Eddie Floyd, and Mack Rice
1971	"Do the Funky Penguin"	Rufus Thomas	44	11	-	Written by Jo Bridges, Rufus Thomas, Mack Rice, and Joe Nixon
1971	"I Can Smell That Funky Music"	Eric Mercury	-	-	-	Written by Steve Cropper, Eddie Floyd, and Mack Rice#30 Canada
1971	"Respect Yourself"	The Staple Singers	12	2	-	Written by Luther Ingram and Mack Rice1984: Kane Gang #21 UK 1987: Bruce Willis #5 US, #20 R&B, #7 UK
1973	"Cheaper to Keep Her"	Johnnie Taylor	15	2	-	
1974	"Santa Claus Wants Some Lovin'"	Albert King	-	-	-	
1976	"Cadillac Assembly Line"	Albert King	-	40	-	

== Later years and death ==
In 1992, backed by the soul band The Dynatones, Rice released his first solo album, Right Now on Blue Suit Records. On it he reprised a number of his hit songs along with a mixture of new tunes.

Rice continued to live in the Detroit area. He died at home in Detroit on June 27, 2016, aged 82, from complications of Alzheimer's disease.
