= Our Love Will Stop the World =

Single by Eric Mercury & Roberta Flack
- B-side: "Only Heaven Can Wait"
- Released: 1983
- Genre: soul
- Length: 3:58
- Label: Atlantic 7-89931
- Songwriter(s): Eric Mercury & Dick Wagner
- Producer(s): Eric Mercury & Roberta Flack

"Our Love Will Stop the World" was a hit song in 1983 for soul singers Eric Mercury and Roberta Flack. This was the second time Eric Mercury had a single in the charts. It was recorded and produced in the United States.

== Background ==
The song was written by Eric Mercury and Dick Wagner, and produced by Eric Mercury and Roberta Flack. It was released on Atlantic 7-89931, the B side was "Only Heaven Can Wait For Love". Calling it a gentle love ballad, the review by Billboard said that the quiet interplay of voices with Mercury gruff and Flack smooth worked well. In comparison to Flack's work with Donny Hathaway, the Cash Box review said that the smokey quality of Mercury's pipes gave the song a decidedly different flavor but the results were no less pleasing.

== Chart performance ==
By February 5, 1983, Cash Box mentioned the single as "Up and Coming" for the Black Contemporary chart. On February 12, the single had made its entrance into the Cash Box Top 100 Black Contemporary Singles chart at #83. By March 5, the single was at #66 in the Top 100 Black Contemporary Singles chart. On March 12 on its sixth week in the charts, it held #65 position in the Billboard Black Singles chart for its second week. Spending seven weeks in the chart, its peak position was at #65. By March 19, it was at #92 on the Cash Box Top 100 Black Contemporary Singles chart. In Canada it was #30 for two weeks on the AC charts.
