= Electric Black Man =

Studio album by Eric Mercury
- Released: 1969
- Genre: Soul, rock, country
- Label: Avco Embassy
- Producer: Gary Kannon

Eric Mercury chronology
Electric Black Man (1969)	Funky Sounds Nurtured in the Fertile Soil of Memphis That Smell of Rock (1971)

Electric Black Man is a 1969 debut album by Eric Mercury. It attracted a good amount of attention when first released and was well received.

== Background ==
Electric Black Man was Eric Mercury's debut album. It was released in late 1969 on Avco-Embassy AVE-33001. It was produced by Gary Katz under the pseudonym Gary Kannon, and was the first full-length album he produced. The musicians who played on the album were Harvey Brooks on bass, Rick Derringer (credited under his real name, Rick Zehringer) on guitar, Paul Harris on keyboards and arrangements, Marty Kupersmith on guitar, Elliott Randall on guitar and Billy Williams on drums.

The fledgling Avco Embassy got behind the newly released Electric Black Man. A party was thrown for Mercury in New York, and another would be thrown when he arrived at the Coast. For the purpose of sales, a seven-minute interview between Mercury and Richard Robinson had been recorded. Along with Maxine Brown's untitled album, Electric Black Man being released in cassette, 8-track and reel to reel formats were the first commercial releases for Ampex tapes.

There are some unexpected moments on the album with country fiddles and wah-wah guitar on "Long Way Down" and jazz-rock horn riffs on the Bobby Bloom composition, "Again 'N Again". On another Bobby Bloom composition, "You Bring Me to My Knees", Mercury stops singing, then starts with what is described as "a little down home soul preaching". He also covers a third Bobby Bloom song, "Life Style".

The first single from the album was a cover of Donovan's "Hurdy Gurdy Man". Backed with "Enter My Love", it was released on Avco Embassy 4516 in January 1970. It received positive reviews from Record World, and Cash Box.

== Reception ==
The Electric Black Man album was in the Record World Pick of the Week section for the week of 1 November 1969. The reviewer wrote that Mercury had introduced himself on the album with a collection of grittily groovily sung new rockers.

In his Record World Money Music column, Kal Rudman described the first cut on the album, "Long Way Down" as having a "cooking Cajun fiddle".

The album received a glowing review in the 8 November issue of Cash Box. Referring to the album as stunning, dynamic and vital, the reviewer said that he had emerged potentially as a figure to be reckoned with on the pop scene. The material that he covered, which includes his own compositions was said to be solid. His vocal style which was said to be rooted in the best of rhythm and blues, and the powerful backing band were also noted.

According to the Insights & Sounds feature in the 15 November issue of Cash Box, Electric Black Man was said to be one of the most exciting of recent releases.

Referring to Cash Box, Billboard, Record World and After Dark as "that voodoo sect", RPM Weekly reported in its 22 November issue that the publications had all taken turns in praising the excitement that had been generated by Eric Mercury who was due to release his album.

It was reported by Record World in the magazine's 20 December issue that Eric Mercury was midway through his successful concert and promotional tour. He was getting a favorable reaction to Electric Black Man as well as the single from the album, "Hurdy Gurdy Man". With the highly positive reviews from his performances and recordings, the executives and field men from Avco-Embassy were reporting that the single and album were getting airplay on the underground, R&B stations as well as a number of A&M stations.

According to Hit Parader, musicians, critics and audiences were unanimous in their praise of the album. Some critics have used the terms psychedelic soul and blues rock to describe the album. The magazine said that Mercury had such a unique style that every listener would hear something different. The album had heavy radio play and generated large advance orders.

== Airplay ==
Referring to Electric Black Man as a super album, Kal Rudman wrote in his Money Music column that the Embassy LP was upsetting the nation. Later in the 29 November issue, Rudman reported that Electric Black Man was getting a potent response.

== Charts ==
Electric Black Man made its debut at No. 35 in the Record World LP's Coming Up chart for the week of 8 November 1969. It peaked at No. 26 for the week of 29 November, and held the position for an additional week. It was still in the chart for the week of 3 January 1970.

== Track listing ==
Side A

1. "Long Way Down" (Gary Kannon, Shelly Weiss) - 3:59
2. "Everybody Has the Right to Love" (Lou Stallman) - 2:21
3. "Tears, No Laughter" (Eric Mercury) - 3:47
4. "Life Style" (Bobby Bloom) - 2:35
5. "Earthless" (David and Jeffrey Budge) - 6:41

Side B

1. "Night Lady" (Mercury, Steve Tindall) - 4:56
2. "Again N' Again" (Bloom, John Linde) - 1:46
3. "Hurdy Gurdy Man" (Donovan Leitch) - 2:37
4. "You Bring Me to My Knees" (Bloom, Marty Kupersmith) - 3:02
5. "Enter My Love" (Mercury) - 3:16
6. "Electric Black Man" (Mercury) - 2:38

== Personnel ==
- Eric Mercury – vocals
- Harvey Brooks – bass
- Billy Williams – drums
- Elliott Randall, Rick Zehringer, Marty Kupersmith – guitars

== Later years ==
Mercury teamed up with composer Anthony Aramouni to record the single, "Bright Eyed Woman". Its launch in 2019 was to coincide with the fiftieth anniversary of the release of Electric Black Man.

In 2019, the album was described by Canada Billboard as "a milestone '60s recording and penetrating music document from a Canadian singer who should have been an international superstar".
