= Don't Treat Me Like a Stranger =

"Don't Treat Me Like a Stranger" is a song written by, and recorded by Dave Loggins. It has been recorded by several artists and was a hit for country singer Randy Gurley in 1979.

== Background ==
The song was written by Dave Loggins and copyrighted on 14 January 1977. He recorded the song and it was included on his One Way Ticket to Paradise album. It was also one of the "best cuts" selected when the album was reviewed in the October 15, 1977 issue of Billboard. The song was the B side to Loggins' single, "Three Little Words (I Love You)" that was released on Epic 8–50326 in early 1977.

The song was also recorded by Connie Smith and appeared on her Pure Connie Smith album that was released in 1977.

== Randy Gurley version ==
"Don't Treat Me Like a Stranger"

Song by Randy Gurley
- A-side: "Don't Treat Me Like a Stranger"
- B-side: "Every Night"
- Released: June, 1979
- Label: RCA PB-11611
- Composer(s): Dave Loggins
- Producer(s): Roy Dea

Randy Gurley singles chronology
"True Love Ways" (1978)	"Don't Treat Me Like a Stranger" (1979)	"If I Ever" (1979)

=== Info ===
This single was Randy Gurley's debut single for the RCA label. It was produced by Roy Dea and released on RCA PB-11611.

=== Reception ===
"Don't Treat Me Like a Stranger" was one of the Top Single Picks in the Country section of the June 16, 1979 issue of Billboard. It was also reviewed in the June 16 issue of Cash Box. The reviewer said that Roy Dea "set the beat bright and up tempo". One of the Country Single Picks, it was reviewed in the June 16 issue of Record World with the reviewer calling it a light, up-tempo tune and that it would appeal to both the country and pop audiences.

=== Chart ===
The song debuted at no. 98 in the Billboard Hot Country Singles chart on the week ending July 14, 1979. It peaked at no. 97 the following week.

== Subsequent versions ==
The song was recorded by Crystal Gayle and appears on both her When I Dream album that was released in 1978 and her Favorites album released in 1980.
