= Mary K. Miller =

- Born: 1957 (age 68–69); Houston, Texas, U.S.
- Origin: Nashville, Tennessee, U.S.
- Genres: Country
- Occupation: Singer
- Instrument: Vocals
- Years active: 1977-1980
- Labels: Inergi, RCA

Mary K. Miller is an American country music singer. From 1977 to 1980, she charted ten singles for Inergi Records.

== Background ==
Mary K. Miller was born in 1957 in Houston, Texas.

She began singing in her hometown at an early age. At age 15, she was discovered by Frank Sinatra at a concert in Las Vegas, Nevada. He signed her to Reprise Records. She recorded for both that label and Capitol Records in her teens, but was unsuccessful.

Record industry executive Vincent Kickerillo discovered her at a private party. Unable to secure her a contract with a major label, he founded the Inergi label in 1977. Her debut single was a cover of "I Fall to Pieces", which charted at number 89 on the Billboard Hot Country Songs charts. Miller charted in the top 20 in 1978 and 1979 with "Handcuffed to a Heartache" and "Next Best Feeling" respectively.

== Career ==
Mary K. Miller recorded the song "I Fall to Pieces" which was backed with "Just Can't Believe You're Gone" and released on Inergi 300 in 1977. It made the Billboard Hot Country chart, peaking at no. 89.

It was reported by Cash Box in the June 30, 1979 issue that Miller along with Cliff Cochran, and Randy Gurley were three artists that were signed to the RCA label.

Her single, "Next Best Feeling" was at no. 7 on the Musicland Country & western chart for the week of April 9, 1979.

Miller was one of the artists who appeared on Jerry Lewis' MDA Telethon in 1979. She performed the Donna Summer song "Last Dance".

Kay recorded the song "Guess Who Loves You" which was composed by Deborah Allen and Rafe Van Hoy. It was released on RCA PB-11665. It was reviewed in the July 21, 1979 issue of Cash Box. The reviewer noted the strong lyrics and said that Kay's bold vocals offered a unique blend.

Along with Kelly Warren, Steve Wariner, Randy Barlow, The Wright Brothers Reunion, and Tom Grant she was to appear at the WIRE Sponsors Free Picnic for Listeners event which was held on July 22nd at the Indianapolis Raceway Park.

On the week of July 28, her single "Guess Who Loves You" made its debut at no. 75 in the Cash Box Top 100 Country chart. Having been in the chart for five weeks, the song peaked at no. 50 in the Top 100 Country chart on the week of August 25. It was also doing well in the Juke Box Programmer Top New Country Singles chart at no. 2, behind "Dream On" by The Oak Ridge Boys. The song held the no. 50 position in the Top 100 Country chart for another week.

Miller charted her last single in 1980 and has not recorded since.

== Singles ==
List of singles, with selected chart positions
Year	Title	Peak positions
Year	Title	US Country
1977	"I Fall to Pieces"	89
1977	"You Just Don't Know"	54
1977	"The Longest Walk"	33
1978	"Right or Wrong"	41
1978	"I Can't Stop Loving You"	28
1978	"Handcuffed to a Heartache"	19
1978	"Going, Going, Gone"	45
1979	"Next Best Feeling"	17
1979	"Guess Who Loves You"	47
1980	"Say a Long Goodbye"	85
