= 9,999,999 Tears =

1966 single by Razzy Bailey

"9,999,999 Years"

Single by Razzy Bailey
- B-side: "Keep Her Out Of Sight"
- Released: 1966
- Genre: Country
- Length: 2:30
- Label: Lowery
- Songwriter: Razzy Bailey

Razzy Bailey singles chronology
"9,999,999 Years" (1966)	"I Hate Hate" (1974)

"9,999,999 Tears"

Single by Dickey Lee

from the album Angels, Roses and Rain
- B-side: "I Will Never Get Over You"
- Released: November 1976
- Recorded: March 2, 1976
- Studio: RCA Studio A, Nashville, Tennessee, United States
- Genre: Country
- Length: 3:00
- Label: RCA
- Songwriter: Razzy Bailey

Dickey Lee singles chronology
"Angels, Roses and Rain" (1975)	"9,999,999 Tears" (1976)	"Makin' Love Don't Always Make Love Grow" (1977)

"9,999,999 Tears" is a 1976 hit single by Dickey Lee. The song was written and originally recorded by American country music artist Razzy Bailey. Originally titled "9,999,999 Years", it was released as a non-album single in 1966 but did not reach the charts.

== Dickey Lee cover ==
Dickey Lee covered "9,999,999 Tears" in 1976. Released in November, it was the third and final single from his album Angels, Roses and Rain. The song peaked at number 3 on the U.S. Billboard Hot Country Singles and Canadian RPM Country Tracks charts. It also reached the pop charts of both nations.

The song about crying marked a return to the pop charts for Lee following a 10-year hiatus. In the interim he had begun a 10-year string of country hits ending in 1981. "9,999,999 Tears" is among his greatest hits and his only hit to have charted on both the pop and country charts.

== Chart performance ==
Chart (1976–77)	Peak position
Canada RPM Country Tracks	3
Canada RPM Top Singles	85
U.S. Billboard Hot 100	52
U.S. Billboard Hot Country Singles	3
U.S. Cash Box Top 100	83
U.S. Cash Box Country Singles	1
