= Cliff Cochran =

American country singer and songwriter

- Born: Clifford Lee Cochran
- Genres: Country
- Occupation: Singer
- Years active: 1970s
- Labels: Renfro Valley, Enterprise, RCA

Cliff Cochran is an American country singer and songwriter who had a number of hits on the US country charts in the period of the mid to late 1970s. His greatest success was "Love Me Like a Stranger"

== Background ==
In 1974, his song "The Way I'm Needing You" made the charts. The following year, he had minor success with "All the Love You'll Ever Need". In 1979, he had his best success with "Love Me Like a Stranger" and later that year, he had some good success with "First Thing Each Morning".

It was the Enterprise record label that established Cochran on the country chart in 1974.

== Career ==
Cliff Cochran composed "Only the Lonely Are Free" with Barbara Webb. It was backed with the song he co-wrote with Jim Dennis, "Love Can't Grow in the Shadows". The songs were released on Renfro Valley 45-11005 in 1972.

Cochran recorded the song "The Way I'm Needing You" which was written by Hank Cochran and Jane Kinsey. It was released on Enterprise 9103 in July, 1974. It was a recommended record in the Top Single Picks of the July 6 issue of Billboard. It was also one of the Country Single Picks in the July 6 issue of Record World. The reviewer referred to it as a dime-puller and said that the crying ballad had a great hook line with Cliff delivering it just right. The following week, it was reported by Marie Ratliff in her Country Hotline column that the song was doing well at KENR, WENO, WMC, and WKDA. She also said that it had Sleeper Potential.

His album was released on Enterprise ENS-7508 in 1974.

It was reported by Cash Box in the magazine's October 19, 1974 issue that Cochran was new to the music business. At the time, his song, "The Way I'm Needing You" was still in the Top 75 chart.

As per the February 8, 1975 issue of RPM Weekly, his song "All the Love You'll Ever Need" was seeing action on Radio CJCJ in Woodstock, N. B., Canada.

It was reported by Cash Box in the June 30, 1979 issue that Cliff Cochran, Randy Gurley and Mary K. Miller were three artists that were signed to the RCA label. And at the time of print, his single, "Love Me Like a Stranger" was at #36 on the Country Chart.

On November 10, 1979, his song "First Thing Each Morning" peaked at no. 29 on the Billboard Hot Country Songs chart. It spent a total of nine weeks in the chart.
