= Gary Stewart (singer) =

American country singer-songwriter (1944–2003)

- Born: Gary Ronnie Stewart; May 28, 1944; Jenkins, Kentucky, U.S.
- Died: December 16, 2003 (aged 59) Fort Pierce, Florida, U.S.
- Genres: Country, honky-tonk
- Occupations: Musician, songwriter
- Instruments: Piano, guitar, bass
- Years active: 1968–2003
- Labels: Cory, Kapp, Decca, RCA, MCA, HighTone, Smith Music Group

Gary Ronnie Stewart (May 28, 1944 – December 16, 2003) was an American musician and songwriter, known for his distinctive vibrato voice. At the height of his popularity in the mid-1970s, Time magazine described him as the "king of honkytonk." He had a series of country chart hits from the mid- to late 1970s, the biggest of which was "She's Actin' Single (I'm Drinkin' Doubles)", which topped the U.S. country singles chart in 1975.

== Early life ==
Stewart was born in Jenkins, Kentucky, on May 28, 1944, the son of George and Georgia Stewart. He was named after the actor Gary Cooper. In 1959 his father, a coal miner, sustained an injury while working in the mines, and shortly afterwards the family moved to Fort Pierce, a city on Florida's Atlantic coast.

== Career ==
Learning guitar and piano, Stewart began touring with local bands and writing songs in his teens. He married Mary Lou Taylor, who was more than three years his senior, at age seventeen and began working days in an airplane factory. He still played in rock and country bands at night. While playing in an Okeechobee, Florida, honky-tonk known as the Wagon Wheel, Stewart met country singer Mel Tillis, who advised Stewart to travel to Nashville to pitch his songs. He recorded a few songs for the small Cory label in 1964 and began co-writing songs with local policeman Bill Eldridge. Stewart and Eldridge wrote Stonewall Jackson's 1965 country hit, "Poor Red Georgia Dirt". Signed to the Kapp label in 1968, Stewart made several unsuccessful recordings but several songwriting successes followed, for artists like Billy Walker ("She Goes Walking Through My Mind", "Traces of a Woman", "It's Time to Love Her"), Cal Smith ("You Can't Housebreak a Tomcat", "It Takes Me All Night Long"), and Nat Stuckey ("Sweet Thang And Cisco"). He even played piano for a time in Charley Pride's band the Pridesmen, and can be heard on Pride's live In Person double-album. Disappointed with Music Row, however, he soon returned to Florida and resumed playing countrified rock 'n' roll in local clubs and bars. In 1970 Motown Records, hoping to get Nashville artists to record their songs, paid Stewart $30 to record countrified demos of "Baby I Need Your Loving", "Yester-Me, Yester-You, Yesterday", and "I Can't Help Myself (Sugar Pie Honey Bunch)".

== Peak of career ==
In case it's not clear why rock and rollers are so excited about a new country singer, it's because he really sings rockabilly, which supposedly flourished for a few years in the mid-'50s and then vanished. What I like best about this compilation of flop singles from a few years ago is the way Stewart transforms rockabilly's adolescent phobias about wimmin into unabashed burlesques involving the likes of 'Big Bertha' and 'The Snuff Queen.'

— Review of You're Not the Woman You Used to Be in Christgau's Record Guide: Rock Albums of the Seventies (1981)

Stewart was dropped from Kapp and then from Decca, but a series of demo tapes, including the countrified Motown tunes, found their way into the hands of producer Roy Dea, who convinced Jerry Bradley to sign Stewart to RCA Records. He returned to Nashville in 1973 and recorded a cover version of "Ramblin' Man" by the Allman Brothers, both of whom were Stewart's personal friends. It charted at only #63 on the country chart, but his follow-up, 1974's "Drinkin' Thing" became a top ten hit. His album Out of Hand was released in early 1975. "Out of Hand", the title cut, became a #4 country hit and was followed by the #1 hit "She's Actin' Single (I'm Drinkin' Doubles)".

The album Out of Hand, which climbed to #6 on the Billboard country album chart, has since become one of the most critically lauded country albums of the 1970s. Village Voice critic Robert Christgau gave the album an A− saying that it "was the best regular issue country LP I've heard in about five years." Rolling Stone gave it high praise as well, stating that, "With practitioners like Stewart around, honky-tonk—and rockabilly—may not be dead yet." Thom Jurek of AllMusic later gave the album five of five stars and stated that a "strong case could be made for Out of Hand as one of the Top 100 country records of all time. It might be in this writer's Top Ten!" Country music critic Bill Malone called Out of Hand "one of the greatest honky-tonk country albums ever recorded."

Later in 1975, MCA released Stewart's old Kapp material scoring a #15 hit with the single "You're Not the Woman You Use to Be". For the rest of the 1970s Stewart played the honky tonks with his road band, The Honky Tonk Liberation Army, and recorded similar albums with modest success for RCA: 1976's Steppin' Out; 1977's Your Place or Mine (which featured guest artists Nicolette Larson, Emmylou Harris, and Rodney Crowell); and 1978's Little Junior. These albums spawned several hit singles, including: "Flat Natural Born Good-Timin' Man", "In Some Room Above the Street", "Single Again", "Your Place or Mine", "Quits", and "Whiskey Trip". His 1977 ode to marital distress entitled "Ten Years of This", from the album Your Place or Mine, was a favorite of Bob Dylan and a #16 hit. Dylan noted his admiration of Stewart in a 1978 interview with Playboy.

== Later career ==
Though his late 1970s albums were well received by critics and his core fans, Stewart never established a large rapport with the general music audience. He was often labeled as "too country" for rock listeners and "too rock" for country fans. In 1980, he released the Chips Moman-produced Cactus and a Rose which featured Southern rockers Gregg Allman, Dickey Betts, Mike Lawler, and Bonnie Bramlett. It did not garner much airplay and RCA teamed Stewart up with songwriter Dean Dillon for a pair of duet records. Soon after, Stewart returned to Florida, where alcoholism and drug use kept him from recording for much of the 1980s. His son, Gary Joseph Stewart, committed suicide late in the decade as well. Stewart signed with the HighTone label in 1988 and recorded three albums over the next five years. These albums included fan favorites like the minor hit "An Empty Glass (That's the Way the Day Ends)" (written by Stewart and Dillon), "Let's Go Jukin'" (written by Stewart and Betts), and "Brand New Whiskey" (written by Stewart and his wife).

Stewart continued to tour through the 1990s, playing venues such as Fort Worth's Billy Bob's Texas several times a year. During this time, Bob Dylan, while touring with Tom Petty in Florida, drove out of his way to meet Stewart, "confessing that he'd played Stewart's ode to marital malaise 'Ten Years of This' over and over, the record casting a spell over him." In 2003, Stewart released Live at Billy Bob's Texas, his first album in ten years and his first-ever live album. Reviewers at Allmusic gave it good marks.

== Death ==
On November 26, 2003, the day before Thanksgiving, his wife of 41 years, Mary Lou, died of pneumonia. Stewart, who had been scheduled to play Billy Bob's three days later, canceled his concert appearances. His friends later told reporters that he was extremely despondent after Mary Lou's death. Less than a month later, on December 16, his daughter's boyfriend and Stewart's close friend, Bill Hardman, visited his Fort Pierce, Florida, home to check on his welfare. They found Stewart dead of a self-inflicted gunshot wound to the neck.

== Posthumous releases ==
In 2005, the Australia-based Raven Records released a CD containing Stewart's second and fourth albums: Steppin' Out and Little Junior, augmented with three previously unreleased bonus tracks from the RCA vaults. It was followed by a second Raven release containing Brotherly Love and Those Were the Days, expanded and augmented by rare bonus tracks which were previously unavailable on CD. Two songs from the era featured on this collection later became hits when recorded by George Strait.

Wounded Bird Records released a CD in 2010 which included the albums Cactus and a Rose and Collector's Series, a comprehensive greatest hits collection. In 2010, UK-based Floating World Records reissued Stewart's albums from the late 1980s and early 1990s: Brand New, Battleground and I'm a Texan. Floating World purchased the entire back catalog from the now-defunct HighTone label. In 2013, UK-based Morello Records released a CD containing Stewart's first and third albums: Out of Hand and Your Place or Mine. In 2017, Morello released a CD containing Stewart's fifth and sixth albums: Gary and Cactus and a Rose.

For Record Store Day in 2018, the Delmore Recording Society label released a 45 rpm single called Mowtown containing Stewart's versions of the Motown classics "Baby I Need Your Loving" and "Yester-Me, Yester-You, Yesterday". Stewart recorded the tracks (and the unreleased "I Can't Help Myself (Sugar Pie Honey Bunch)") in 1970 when Motown Records wanted demos of their songs in a Nashville style, hoping to interest country music artists in recording Motown songs. Stewart was paid $30 for the session.

In May 2020, the Austin-based band Mike and the Moonpies released Touch of You: The Lost Songs of Gary Stewart, an album of unreleased songs written or co-written by Stewart. The band's version of Stewart's "Smooth Shot of Whiskey", featuring Mark Wystrach of the band Midland was released as a single.

== Discography ==
=== Albums ===
Year	Album	US Country	Label
1973	You're Not the Woman You Used to Be	—	MCA
1975	Out of Hand	6	RCA
1976	Steppin' Out	15	RCA
1977	Your Place or Mine	17	RCA
1978	Little Junior	35	RCA
1979	Gary	45	RCA
1980	Cactus and a Rose	49	RCA
1982	Brotherly Love (with Dean Dillon)	23	RCA
1983	Those Were the Days (with Dean Dillon)	54	RCA
1988	Brand New	63	Hightone
1990	Battleground	—	Hightone
1993	I'm a Texan	—	Hightone
2003	Live at Billy Bob's	—	Smith Music Group

=== Compilation albums ===
Year	Album	Label
1981	Greatest Hits	RCA
1984	20 of the Best	RCA
1985	Collector's Series	RCA
1991	Gary's Greatest	Hightone
1997	The Essential Gary Stewart	RCA
1999	Your Place or Mine: The Best of Gary Stewart	BMG Camden
2002	Best of the Hightone Years	Hightone
2004	RCA Country Legends	RCA Nashville
2026	One Track Mind	Delmore Recording Society

=== Singles ===
Year	Single	Peak positions		Album
Year	Single	US Country	CAN Country	Album
1973	"Ramblin' Man"	63	—	non-album single
1974	"Drinkin' Thing"	10	—	Out of Hand
1974	"Out of Hand"	4	10	Out of Hand
1975	"She's Actin' Single (I'm Drinkin' Doubles)"	1	4	Out of Hand
1975	"You're Not the Woman You Used to Be"	15	22	You're Not the Woman You Used to Be
1975	"Flat Natural Born Good-Timin' Man"	20	17	Steppin' Out
1976	"Oh, Sweet Temptation"	23	17	Steppin' Out
1976	"In Some Room Above the Street"	15	14	Steppin' Out
1976	"Your Place or Mine"	11	7	Your Place or Mine
1977	"Ten Years of This"	16	25	Your Place or Mine
1977	"Quits"	26	—	Steppin' Out
1978	"Whiskey Trip"	16	5	Little Junior
1978	"Single Again"	36	45	Little Junior
1978	"Stone Wall (Around Your Heart)"	41	—	Little Junior
1979	"Shady Streets"	66	44	Gary
1979	"Mazelle"	75	—	Gary
1980	"Cactus and a Rose"	48	—	Cactus and a Rose
1980	"Are We Dreamin' the Same Dream" / "Roarin'"	66	—	Cactus and a Rose
1981	"Let's Forget That We're Married"	72	—	non-album singles
1981	"She's Got a Drinking Problem"	36	—	non-album singles
1982	"Brotherly Love" (with Dean Dillon)	41	—	Brotherly Love
1982	"She Sings Amazing Grace"	83	—	Brotherly Love
1983	"Those Were the Days" (with Dean Dillon)	47	—	Those Were the Days
1983	"Smokin' in the Rockies" (with Dean Dillon)	71	—	Those Were the Days
1984	"Hey, Bottle of Whiskey"	75	—	non-album singles
1984	"I Got a Bad Attitude"	64	—	non-album singles
1988	"Brand New Whiskey"	63	—	Brand New
1989	"An Empty Glass (That's the Way the Day Ends)"	64	—	Brand New
1989	"Rainin' Rainin' Rainin'"	77	—	Brand New
"—" denotes releases that did not chart

== Bibliography ==
- Bogdanov, Vladimir; Chris Woodstra; Stephen Thomas Erlewine (2003). All Music Guide to Country: The Definitive Guide to Country Music. San Francisco: Backbeat Books. pp. 721–722. ISBN 0-87930-760-9.
- Dansby, Andrew (December 19, 2003). "Country Singer Stewart Dead: Seventies star fused southern rock and honky-tonk". Rolling Stone.
- DeVoss, David (September 27, 1976). "A Honky-Tonk Man". Time. New York. Archived from the original on November 3, 2007.
- Flippo, Chet (December 17, 2003). "Honky-Tonk Singer Gary Stewart Dies: Out of Hand country rocker apparently committed suicide". Cmt.com. Archived from the original on June 30, 2007.
- Malone, Bill C. (2006). Don't Get Above Your Raisin': Country Music and the Southern Working Class. Urbana: University of Illinois Press. p. 363. ISBN 0-252-07366-5.
- McDonough, Jimmy (2026). Gary Stewart: I Am from the Honky-Tonks. Wolf+Salmon. ISBN 979-8--99057991-0.
- Miller, Jim (July 3, 1975). "Gary Stewart: Out of Hand". Rolling Stone. No. 190.
- Stambler, Irwin; Grelun Landon (1997). Country Music: The Encyclopedia. New York: St. Martin's Press. pp. 464–465. ISBN 0-312-15121-7.
- Wolff, Kurt; Orla Duane (2000). Country Music: The Rough Guide. London: Rough Guides. pp. 376–377. ISBN 1-85828-534-8.
- "Gary Stewart". Lone Star Music.
- "Gary Stewart". Rolling Stone. Archived from the original on June 3, 2008.
