= May the Force Be with You Always =

Single by Tom T. Hall

from the album New Train Same Rider
- B-side: "No One Feels My Hurt"
- Released: November 21, 1977
- Genre: Country
- Length: 2:47
- Label: RCA
- Songwriter: Tom T. Hall
- Producers: Roy Dea, Tom T. Hall

Tom T. Hall singles chronology
"It's All in the Game" (1977)	"May the Force Be with You Always" (1977)	"I Wish I Loved Somebody Else" (1978)

"May the Force Be with You Always" is a song written and recorded by American country music artist Tom T. Hall. It was released in November 1977 as the lead single from the album, New Train Same Rider. The song peaked at number 13 on the U.S. country singles chart and at number 5 on the Canadian country singles chart.

== Chart performance ==
Chart (1977)	Peak position
US Hot Country Songs (Billboard)	13
Canadian RPM Country Tracks	5
