= The Old Side of Town =

Single by Tom T. Hall

from the album Ol't's in Town
- B-side: "Jesus on the Radio (Daddy on the Phone)"
- Released: December 10, 1979
- Genre: Country
- Length: 3:00
- Label: RCA
- Songwriter: Tom T. Hall
- Producers: Roy Dea, Tom T. Hall

Tom T. Hall singles chronology
"You Show Me Your Heart (And I'll Show You Mine)" (1979)	"The Old Side of Town" (1979)	"Soldier of Fortune" (1980)

"Old Side of Town" is a song written and recorded by American country music artist Tom T. Hall. It was released in December 1979 as the second and final single from the album, Ol't's in Town. The song peaked at number 9 on both the U.S. and Canadian country singles chart.

== Content ==
The narrator tells the tale of the old days in a traditional country setting.

== Charts ==
Chart (1979–1980)	Peak position
US Hot Country Songs (Billboard)	9
Canadian RPM Country Tracks	9
