= Cactus and a Rose =

Studio album by Gary Stewart
- Released: 1980
- Genre: Country, Southern rock, honky-tonk
- Length: 30:01
- Label: RCA
- Producer: Chips Moman

Gary Stewart chronology
Gary (1979)	Cactus and a Rose (1980)	Brotherly Love (with Dean Dillon) (1982)

Cactus and a Rose is an album by the American musician Gary Stewart, released in 1980. The singer's seventh studio album, it only reached No. 49 on Billboard's "Country Albums" chart, spawning two low-charting singles: "Cactus and a Rose" (No. 48) and "Are We Dreamin' the Same Dream" (No. 66). Produced by Chips Moman, it features Southern rockers Gregg Allman, Dickey Betts, Mike Lawler, Bonnie Bramlett (from Delaney, Bonnie & Friends), and Randy Scruggs, in Stewart's usual honky-tonk style.

== Critical reception ==
Professional ratings
Review scores
Source	Rating
AllMusic	3/5 stars
Robert Christgau	B−

According to AllMusic, the album proves that "Stewart could have easily fronted the Allman Brothers or Marshall Tucker or, vocally kicked Charlie Daniels' southern rock butt from here to Pascagoula as a great honky tonk singer."

== Track listing ==
1. "Okeechobee Purple" (Chips Moman, Buddy Emmons) – 2:40
2. "Cactus and a Rose" (Moman, Emmons) – 3:21
3. "Staring Each Other Down" (Moman, Emmons) – 3:24
4. "Lovers' Knot" (Richard Supa) – 3:58
5. "Ghost Train" (Gary Stewart, Gregg Allman) – 3:36
6. "Roarin'" (Mike Lawler, Johnny Cobb) – 3:54
7. "Harlan County Highway" (Stewart, Dickey Betts) – 3:53
8. "Are We Dreamin' the Same Dream" (Billy Burnette, Johnny Christopher) – 4:03
9. "How Could We Come to This After That" (Reynolds, Stewart) – 2:51
10. "We Made It as Lovers (We Just Couldn't Make It as Friends)" (Moman, Emmons) – 2:24

== Chart performance ==
Chart (1980)	Peak position
U.S. Billboard Top Country Albums	49
