= She's Actin' Single (I'm Drinkin' Doubles) =

Single by Gary Stewart

from the album Out of Hand
- B-side: "Williamson County"
- Released: March 1975
- Genre: Country
- Length: 2:46
- Label: RCA
- Songwriter(s): Wayne Carson
- Producer(s): Roy Dea

Gary Stewart singles chronology
"Out of Hand" (1974)	"She's Actin' Single (I'm Drinkin' Doubles)" (1975)	"You're Not the Woman You Used to Be" (1975)

"She's Actin' Single (I'm Drinkin' Doubles)" is a song written by Wayne Carson, and recorded by American country music singer Gary Stewart. It was released in March 1975 as the third and final single from the album Out of Hand. The song was Stewart's third top ten hit on the country chart and his only song to hit number one. The single stayed at number one for a single week and spent a total of nine weeks within the top 40.

== Chart performance ==
Chart (1975)	Peak position
US Hot Country Songs (Billboard)	1
Canadian RPM Country Tracks	4

== Cover versions ==
- A version by Randy Rogers Band appears on the 2005 compilation album Brewed in Texas, Volume 2.
- In 2010, Ronnie Dunn of Brooks & Dunn covered the song for the soundtrack to the film Country Strong and on the same record label (RCA Records).
- American indie band Wednesday covered the song in their 2022 album Mowing the Leaves Instead of Piling 'Em Up.
