= Angels, Roses and Rain =

Single by Dickey Lee

from the album Angels, Roses and Rain
- B-side: "Danna"
- Released: January 1976
- Genre: Country
- Label: RCA
- Songwriters: Bob Morrison; Bill Zerface; Jim Zerface

Dickey Lee singles chronology
"Rocky" (1975)	"Angels, Roses and Rain" (1976)	"Makin' Love Don't Always Make Love Grow" (1976)

"Angels, Roses and Rain" is a single by American country music artist Dickey Lee. Released in January 1976, it was the first single from his album Angels, Roses and Rain. The song peaked at number 9 on the Billboard Hot Country Singles chart. It also reached number 1 on the RPM Country Tracks chart in Canada.

== Chart performance ==
Chart (1976)	Peak position
U.S. Billboard Hot Country Singles	9
Canadian RPM Country Tracks	1
