= Out of Hand (song) =

Single by Gary Stewart

from the album Out of Hand
- B-side: "Draggin' Shackles"
- Released: October 7, 1974
- Genre: Country
- Length: 2:47
- Label: RCA
- Songwriters: Tom Jans, Jeff Barry
- Producer: Roy Dea

Gary Stewart singles chronology
| "Drinkin' Thing" (1974) | "Out of Hand" (1974) | "She's Actin' Single (I'm Drinkin' Doubles)" (1975) |

"Out of Hand" is a song written by Tom Jans and Jeff Barry and recorded by American country music singer Gary Stewart. It was released in October 1974 as the second single and title from the album Out of Hand. The song peaked at number 4 on the U.S. Billboard Hot Country Singles chart and number 10 on the Canadian RPM Country Tracks chart.

== Chart performance ==
| Chart (1974–1975) | Peak position |
|---|---|
| US Hot Country Songs (Billboard) | 4 |
| Canadian RPM Country Tracks | 10 |
