= Dickey Lee =

American singer-songwriter (born 1936)

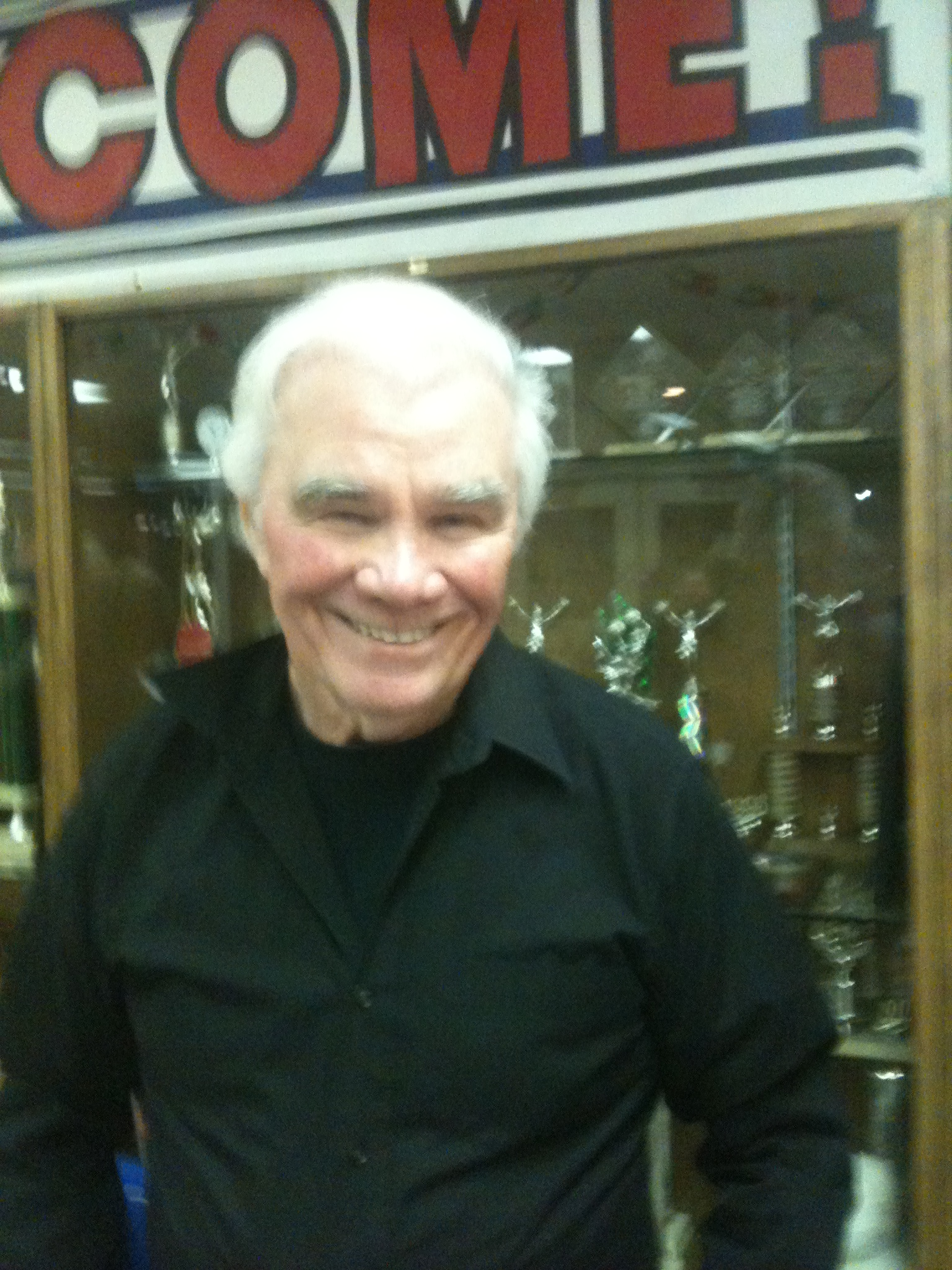
- Lee at Alpena High School in 2012

Background information
- Born: Royden Dickey Lipscomb; September 21, 1936 (age 89); Memphis, Tennessee, U.S.
- Origin: Nashville, Tennessee, U.S.
- Genres: Country
- Occupation: Singer-songwriter
- Instruments: Guitar, vocals
- Years active: 1957–present
- Labels: Tampa, Sun, Smash, TCF Hall, RCA, Mercury

Royden Dickey Lipscomb (born September 21, 1936), known professionally as Dickey Lee (sometimes misspelled Dickie or Dicky), is an American pop/country singer and songwriter, best known for the 1960s teenage tragedy songs "Patches" and "Laurie (Strange Things Happen)". He also has a number of hit songs on the country charts in the 1970s, including "Rocky" and "9,999,999 Tears", and has written or co-written songs recorded by other singers, such as "She Thinks I Still Care", "The Door Is Always Open" and "The Keeper of the Stars".

== Career ==
Lee formed a country trio while he was still at school at the age of 16, performing at his school and local functions. In 1957–1958, Lee made his first two recordings, "Dream Boy" and "Stay True Baby", in his hometown of Memphis for Tampa Records, later released two songs for Sun Records in, although the song were only regional hits. He moved to Texas, and achieved his first chart success in 1962, when his composition with Steve Duffy "She Thinks I Still Care" was a hit for George Jones (later recorded by Elvis Presley, Connie Francis, Leon Russell, and later Anne Murray as "He Thinks I Still Care"). Glen Campbell also recorded it for his final album, Adios, and the song has remained a country standard.

Later that year, "Patches", written by Barry Mann and Larry Kobler and recorded by Lee for Smash Records, rose to No. 6. The song tells in waltz-time the story of teenage lovers of different social classes whose parents forbid their love. The girl drowns herself in the "dirty old river". The singer concludes: "It may not be right, but I'll join you tonight/ Patches I'm coming to you." Because of the teen suicide theme, the song was banned by a number of radio stations. However, it sold over one million copies and was awarded a gold disc. It is in this period that he changed his name legally from Royden Dickey Lipscomb to Dickey Lee after a man of a similar name attempted to sue him for using his name.

Lee had a No. 14 hit in 1963 with a song he co-wrote, a conventional rocker, "I Saw Linda Yesterday". In 1965, he returned to teen tragedy with "Laurie (Strange Things Happen)", a song related to the urban legends known as the vanishing hitchhiker and Resurrection Mary. He focused primarily on production and songwriting in the late '60s.

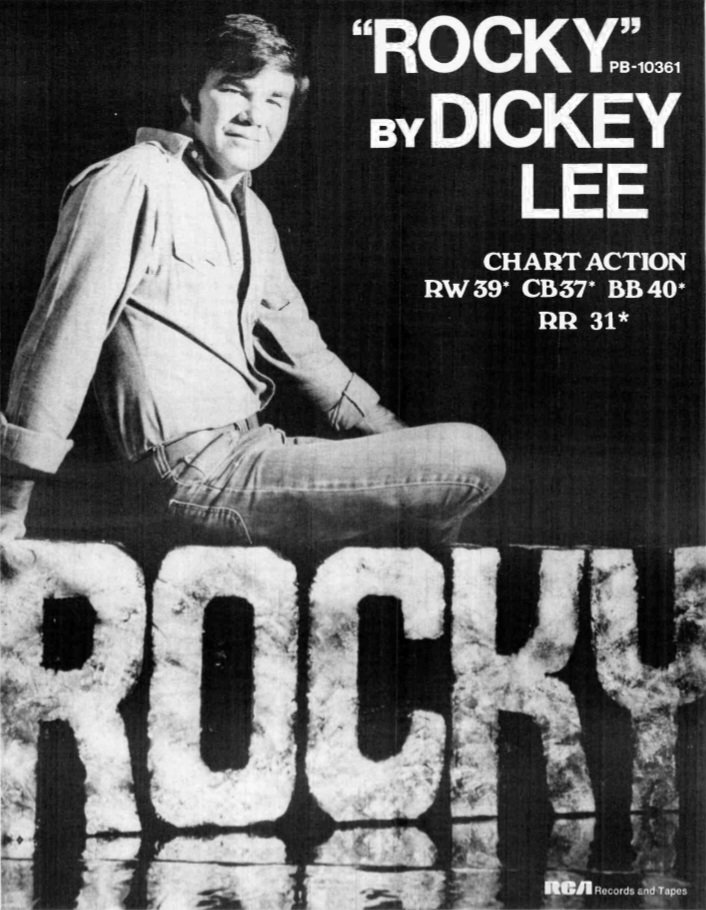
Trade ad for "Rocky", 1975

Lee returned to Nashville in 1969 and signed with RCA, and started releasing songs to the country chart in 1970. His 1970s country hits as a singer include two remakes of pop songs, Delaney & Bonnie's "Never Ending Song of Love" and Austin Roberts' "Rocky" (another bitter-sweet song, written by Ronald Johnson under the moniker Jay Stevens – aka Woody P. Snow), in addition to original songs such as "Angels, Roses, and Rain", and "9,999,999 Tears".

Lee co-wrote several songs with Bob McDill, including "Someone Like You" (by Emmylou Harris), "I've Been Around Enough To Know" (first recorded by Jo-El Sonnier in 1973, but would become a No. 1 hit in 1984 for John Schneider), and "The Door is Always Open" (by several artists, most notably by Dave and Sugar). He also co-wrote the 1994 Tracy Byrd hit, "The Keeper of the Stars", and has written or co-written songs for a number of other prominent country artists, including George Strait, Charley Pride, and Reba McEntire.

He was inducted into the Nashville Songwriters Hall of Fame in 1995. Lee is included as co-writer and singer on singer-songwriter Michael Saxell's 2005 album Wonky Windmill on the song "Two Men." In 1987 Lee became a lifetime member of the prestigious Nashville, Tn. organization (R.O.P.E.) Reunion of Professional Entertainers.

== Discography ==
=== Albums ===
Year	Album	Chart Positions		Label
Year	Album	US Country	US	Label
1962	The Tale of Patches	—	50	Smash
1965	Laurie and the Girl from Peyton Place	—	—	TCF Hall
1971	Never Ending Song of Love	12	—	RCA Victor
1972	Ashes of Love	16	—	RCA Victor
1972	Baby, Bye Bye	—	—	RCA Victor
1973	Crying Over You	42	—	RCA Victor
1973	Sparklin' Brown Eyes	—	—	RCA Victor
1975	Rocky	8	—	RCA Victor
1976	Angels, Roses and Rain	27	—	RCA Victor
1979	Dickey Lee	—	—	Mercury
1980	Again	—	—	Mercury
1981	Everybody Loves a Winner	—	—	Mercury

=== Singles ===
Year	Titles (A-side, B-side) Both sides from same album except where indicated	Chart Positions				Album
Year	Titles (A-side, B-side) Both sides from same album except where indicated	US Country	US	CAN Country	CAN	Album
1962	"Patches" b/w "More or Less" (Non-album track)	—	6	—	—	The Tale of Patches
1963	"I Saw Linda Yesterday" b/w "The Girl I Can’t Forget"	—	14	—	—	Non-album tracks
1963	"Don't Wanna Think About Paula" b/w "Just a Friend"	—	68	—	—	Non-album tracks
1963	"I Go Lonely" b/w "Ten Million Faces"	—	—	—	—	Non-album tracks
1963	"The Day the Sawmill Closed Down" b/w "She Wants to Be Bobby’s Girl"	—	104	—	—	Non-album tracks
1964	"To the Aisle" b/w "Mother Nature"	—	—	—	—	Non-album tracks
1964	"Me and My Teardrops" b/w "Only Trust in Me"	—	—	—	—	Non-album tracks
1964	"Big Brother" b/w "She’s Walking Away" (Non-album track)	—	101	—	—	Laurie and the Girl From Peyton Place
1965	"Laurie (Strange Things Happen)" b/w "Party Doll" (Non-album track)	—	14	—	6	Laurie and the Girl From Peyton Place
1965	"The Girl from Peyton Place" b/w "A Girl I Used to Know"	—	73	—	23	Laurie and the Girl From Peyton Place
1966	"Good Girl Goin' Bad" b/w "Pretty White Dress"	—	—	—	—	Non-album tracks
1966	"Good Guy" b/w "Annie" (from Laurie and the Girl From Peyton Place)	—	—	—	—	Non-album tracks
1968	"Red, Green, Yellow and Blue" b/w "Run Right Back"	—	107	—	—	Non-album tracks
1970	"All Too Soon" b/w "Charlie (My Whole World)"	—	—	—	—	Non-album tracks
1971	"The Mahogany Pulpit" b/w "Everybody’s Reaching Out for Someone"	55	—	—	—	Never Ending Song of Love
1971	"Never Ending Song of Love" b/w "On the Southbound"	8	—	31	—	Never Ending Song of Love
1972	"I Saw My Lady" b/w "What We Used To Hang On To (Is Gone)" (Non-album track)	25	—	—	—	Ashes of Love
1972	"Ashes of Love" b/w "A Kingdom I Call Home"	15	—	—	—	Ashes of Love
1972	"Baby, Bye Bye" b/w "She Thinks I Still Care" (from Ashes of Love)	31	—	15	—	Baby, Bye Bye
1973	"Crying Over You" b/w "My World Around You"	43	—	—	—	Crying Over You
1973	"Put Me Down Softly" b/w "If She Turns Up in Ohio" (from Crying Over You)	30	—	—	—	Sparklin' Brown Eyes
1973	"Sparklin' Brown Eyes" b/w "A Country Song"	49	—	—	—	Sparklin' Brown Eyes
1974	"I Use the Soap" b/w "Strawberry Women" (from Sparklin’ Brown Eyes)	46	—	—	—	Rocky
1974	"Give Me One Good Reason" b/w "Sweet Fever"	90	—	—	—	Rocky
1974	"The Busiest Memory in Town" b/w "A Way to Go On" (from Baby, Bye Bye)	22	—	15	—	Rocky
1975	"The Door’s Always Open" b/w "You Make It Look So Easy"	—	—	—	—	Rocky
1975	"Rocky" b/w "The Closest Thing to You"	1	—	9	—	Rocky
1976	"Angels, Roses and Rain" b/w "Danna"	9	—	1	—	Angels, Roses and Rain
1976	"Makin' Love Don't Always Make Love Grow" b/w "I Never Will Get Over You"	35	—	—	—	Angels, Roses and Rain
1976	"9,999,999 Tears" b/w "I Never Will Get Over You"	3	52	3	85	Angels, Roses and Rain
1977	"If You Gotta Make a Fool of Somebody" b/w "My Love Shows Thru"	20	—	17	—	Non-album tracks
1977	"Virginia, How Far Will You Go" b/w "My Love Shows Thru"	22	—	12	—	Non-album tracks
1977	"Peanut Butter" b/w "Breezy Was Her Name"	21	—	39	—	Non-album tracks
1978	"Love Is a Word" b/w "I’ll Be Leaving Alone" (from Angels, Roses and Rain)	27	—	—	—	Non-album tracks
1978	"My Heart Won't Cry Anymore" b/w "Danna" (from Angels, Roses and Rain)	49	—	—	—	Non-album tracks
1978	"It's Not Easy" b/w "I’ve Been Honky Tonkin’ Too Long"	58	—	—	—	Non-album tracks
1979	"I'm Just a Heartache Away" b/w "Midnight Flyer"	58	—	—	—	Dickey Lee
1979	"He's an Old Rock 'N' Roller" b/w "It Hurts to Be in Love"	94	—	—	—	Dickey Lee
1980	"Don't Look Back" b/w "I’m Trustin’ a Feelin’"	61	—	—	—	Dickey Lee
1980	"Workin' My Way to Your Heart" b/w "If You Want Me" (from Dickey Lee)	30	—	—	—	Again
1980	"Lost in Love" (with Kathy Burdick) b/w "Again"	30	—	—	—	Again
1981	"Honky Tonk Hearts" b/w "It’s Best I Hit the Road" (from Dickey Lee)	37	—	—	—	Everybody Loves a Winner
1981	"I Wonder If I Care as Much" b/w "Further Than a Country Mile"	53	—	—	—	Everybody Loves a Winner
1982	"Everybody Loves a Winner" b/w "You Won’t Be Here Tonight"	56	—	—	—	Everybody Loves a Winner
