= Drinkin' Thing =

Single by Gary Stewart

from the album Out of Hand
- B-side: "I See The Want-To In Your Eyes"
- Released: May 13, 1974
- Genre: Country
- Length: 2:59
- Label: RCA
- Songwriter(s): Wayne Carson
- Producer(s): Roy Dea

Gary Stewart singles chronology
"Ramblin' Man" (1973)	"Drinkin' Thing" (1974)	"Out of Hand" (1974)

"Drinkin' Thing" is a song written by Wayne Carson, and recorded by American country music singer Gary Stewart. It was released in May 1974 as the lead single from the album, Out of Hand. The song peaked at number 10 on the U.S. Billboard Hot Country Singles chart.

== Chart performance ==
Chart (1974)	Peak position
US Hot Country Songs (Billboard)	10
