= Eric Mercury =

Canadian singer (1944–2022)

- Also known as: Electric Black Man, Merc
- Born: Eric Alexander Mercury; 28 June 1944; Toronto, Ontario, Canada
- Died: 14 March 2022 (aged 77) Toronto, Ontario, Canada
- Genre: Soul
- Occupations: Singer
- Years active: 1962–2022
- Labels: Clip, Sac, Avco Embassy, Enterprise, Mercury, Columbia, Capitol, Atlantic, Manhattan, Anthony Aramouni
- Formerly of: The Pharaohs, Dianne Brooks, Eric Mercury and The Soul Searchers, Eric Mercury Birthrite, Merc & Monk

Eric Alexander Mercury (28 June 1944 – 14 March 2022) was a Canadian singer who was a member of the soul group The Soul Searchers during the 1960s. He later made waves in 1969 with his Electric Black Man album. He had two hits: the first on the Canadian charts in 1972 with "I Can Smell That Funky Music", and the second in the United States in 1983, singing a duet with Roberta Flack with "Our Love Will Stop the World". He also co-wrote the song "Down the Backstairs of My Life".

== Background ==
=== Family ===
Born into a musical family and the youngest of seven children, he was raised in Toronto, Ontario. His father, Methodist minister George Luther Mercury, was from Saint Vincent and the Grenadines. His mother, Gladys Viola Mercury (née Smith), came from Jamaica. They were community leaders who worked just west of the core of Toronto, out of the British Methodist Episcopal Church.

=== Musical etc. ===
The two groups he performed in during the 1960s were The Pharaohs and later The Soul Searchers. Following this, he moved to New York in 1968 to perform by himself.

His debut solo album, Electric Black Man, was released on Avco Embassy in 1969. It was considered by many in the music industry as a recording milestone in the 1960s. Mercury left his original Avco Embassy label and signed a deal with Enterprise Records, an imprint of Stax Records. His follow-up solo albums were Funky Sounds Nurtured in the Fertile Soil of Memphis That Smell of Rock (1971), Love Is Taking Over (1973), Eric Mercury (1975), and Gimme a Call Sometime (1981).

Mercury moved to Los Angeles from 1971 until Christmas 1978, when he relocated to New York. Eventually returning to Toronto, he worked in a management and production role for the band Age of Reason. The band failed to attract any interest from major record labels, and Mercury went to Chicago until 1997, when he again returned to Toronto. He wrote material for other artists such as Roberta Flack and Donny Hathaway, for whom he also produced. Mercury's other contributions include vocals to Michael Jordan's "Be Like Mike" advertising jingle for Gatorade.

He had a few acting roles, appearing in the stage production of Jesus Christ Superstar. He also had a role in the film The Fish that Saved Pittsburgh as Rudy, the league commissioner, and as Tyrone Blackwood in American Hot Wax.

== Career ==
=== 1960s ===
In 1966, Eric Mercury had a single, "I Wondered Why" / "Softly", released on Clip 1122. The group that backed him was The Silhouettes. Diane Brooks and Steve Kennedy were members of the group. According to William D. Smith's book, A Stroke of Luck, Smith and Kennedy had the idea of putting together a group to play behind Brooks, whom Kennedy was romantically involved with. The name of the group was The Soul Searchers. However, the real name was Diane Brooks, Eric Mercury, and The Soul Searchers. This all came together in April 1966. The instrumental part of the group was made up of Eric "Mouse" Johnson on drums and vocals, Steve Kennedy on tenor, baritone sax and background vocals, Terry Logan on guitar and vocals, and William "Smitty" Smith on Hammond B3 organ and vocals. Their first gig was at Memory Lane in Toronto.

While things were progressing, Brooks got an offer to record for herself. Due to the band supposedly not being up to the task and lacking in experience, they did not get to play on the recording. At some stage, while having played in Canada and the US, the Soul Searchers were still an unsigned group. However, they had attracted the attention of a young producer, C. Nash. He had been coming along to their performances, and he wanted to record them. A session was set up in the middle of the night in Detroit, where the group had been playing at the time. The recording session took place in a small, basic studio. The song "Lonely Girl", which was written by William "Mickey" Stevenson and Ivy Jo Hunter, had been rejected by Motown. It was learned, rehearsed, and arranged in a few hours, then recorded. Ten copies of the record were given to the group. There was no airplay or promotion, and that was the last they saw of Nash. The single credited to Eric Mercury and the Soul Searchers would eventually become a highly prized collector's item, attracting some very high prices. By the summer of 1968, the Soul Searchers were a very popular band in Canada, with Mercury fronting them. It was when they were playing in Halifax that he decided to leave the band. Decades later, in an interview with Bill King of FYI Music News, Mercury said the straw that pushed him out was when the band played a gig without him at the Mercury Club on Victoria Street. Two other reasons for his departure were the murder of Dr. Martin Luther King Jr. as well as what Richie Havens was doing musically. A few days later, after the Mercury Club non-inclusion incident, he got a ride with two hookers heading to New York with just a library card and $52 on him.

While trying to make things happen musically, he was sheltering at the Port Authority Bus Terminal, where he slept in an abandoned Studebaker.

By November 1968, Mercury was one of the acts signed to a new firm, Fairlead Management, which was formed by Attorneys Bennett Gotzer and Dennis Katz, who was the brother of musician Steve Katz.

Mercury recorded his debut solo album, Electric Black Man, and it was released in 1969. A review of the album from Village Voice critic Robert Christgau said, "Mercury is a fairly strong singer. Maybe someday he'll put out a fairly strong album." Others proved to be bigger fans of the LP, including Miles Davis.

=== 1970s ===
The 30 January 1970 issue of Cash Box announced that Mercury had dropped the "Electric Black Man" name, that his group was now called Eric Mercury Birthrite, and that they were recording at the Fillmore East on the 23rd and 24th of that month. The musicians in the band included guitarist and music director Elliott Randall, organist Carson Whitsett, and two young musicians, Willie Weeks and Bill Lordan. The group also played other venues, such as Fillmore East, Boston Tea Party, and Whiskey Au Go Go.

It was reported in the 11 December 1971 edition of Billboard that Allan Katz, the national promotional director of Polydor, had taken Mercury on a cross-country tour, visiting stations from Toronto to Vancouver to promote his new album, Funky Sounds Nurtured in the Fertile Soil of Memphis That Smell of Rock. His single "I Can Smell That Funky Music" had just been released as well. By the 31st of that month, the single was at #12 on the CKVN 1410 Top 40 chart and eventually reached number 30 in Canada on 15 January 1972.

In November 1973, Mercury appeared at the Millennium '73 festival at the Astrodome in Houston, Texas, which had Guru Maharaj Ji as the star attraction. Booked to perform on stage on the first day, with Stax Records promising a great spot for him and promotional hype to match, he did not come on until four in the afternoon. He performed to a disappointingly low audience, with just 4000 or 5000 people in the entire stadium. Actor Marjoe Gortner was there on stage as well. Gortner, a former preacher, noted that one of the songs Mercury performed was one he had heard in churches when he was a child.

In 1975, his self-titled Eric Mercury album was released. This is where the song "Down the Backstairs of My Life" made its first recorded appearance. Co-written with William D. Smith, the song was recorded by artists such as Smith, Dianne Brooks, Yvonne Elliman, Leah Kunkel, Thelma Houston, Kenny Rankin, Joey Scarbury, and Dee Dee Warwick. For the week of 23 May, the album was getting airplay on KWST FM in Los Angeles. The following week, it was being played on KMET FM in Los Angeles.

That year also saw motor car manufacturer Lincoln-Mercury want Mercury to compose and sing commercial jungles for their 1976 line of cars. Music magazine Radio & Records noted in their 13 June issue that Eric Mercury had a cousin called Lincoln Mercury.

=== 1980s to 1990s ===
In August 1981, his album Gimme a Call Sometime was released on Capitol ST12126. In the short review, Billboard recommended the tracks "It's Just Like Love", "To Become", "Gimme a Call Sometime" and "To Get it Right". A gimmick used to promote the LP was the setting up of two toll-free numbers by Capitol. Callers who rang would go through to a tape recording of Eric Mercury giving a brief sales pitch. By 5 March 1983, the single Mercury recorded with Roberta Flack, "Our Love Will Stop the World", was at #66 in the Top 100 Black Contemporary Singles chart. By 19 March, it was down to #93. The song peaked at #65.

Merc and Monk was a duo project with Thelonious Monk Jr. They released a self-titled album in 1985.

=== 2000s ===
In 2019, Mercury collaborated with Anthony Aramouni, a Montreal composer, and the song "Bright Eyed Woman" was released. The launch of the song was to coincide with the 50th anniversary of the release of his album, Electric Black Man.

In 2021, the highly collectible Eric Mercury & The Soul Searchers single, originally released on the SAC label, saw a re-release on the Big Man Records label.

== Illness and death ==
Mercury died from pancreatic cancer on 14 March 2022, at the age of 77.

== Discography ==
USA singles unless specified otherwise
Act	Song title	Release info	Year	Notes #
Eric Mercury	"I Wondered Why" / "Softly"	Clip KXP 1112	1966	
Eric Mercury and the Soul Searchers	"Lonely Girl" / "Lonely Girl" [Part 2]	Sac 5-0001	1968	
Eric Mercury	"Hurdy Gurdy Man" / "Enter My Love"	Avco Embassy AVE-4516	1970	
Eric Mercury	" Everybody Has The Right To Love" / "You Bring Me to My Knees"	Avco Embassy AVE-4523	1970	
Eric Mercury	"I Can Smell That Funky Music" / "Listen With Your Eyes"	Enterprise ENA-9041	1971	
Eric Mercury	"What's Usual Seems Natr'l" / "The Truth Will Set You Free"	Enterprise ENA-9047	1972	
Eric Mercury	"Love Is Taking Over" / "Take A Walk Down My Street"	Enterprise ENA-9080	1973	
Eric Mercury	"Don't Lose Faith in Me Lord" / "Sweet Sara"	Enterprise ENA-9089	1973	
Eric Mercury	"Pours When It Pains" / "Colour Yesterdays"	Mercury 73679	1975	
Eric Mercury	"Sweetie Pie" / "Down the Backstairs of My Life"	Mercury 73699	1975	
Eric Mercury	"Take Me Girl I'm Ready" / "Love Is on Our Side"	Columbia 3-10729	1978	
Eric Mercury	"Gimme a Call Sometime" / "Include Me Out"	Capitol A5020	1981	
Eric Mercury	"Get it Right" / "Kill 'Em (With Love)"	Capitol A-5058	1981	
Eric Mercury And Roberta Flack	"Our Love Will Stop the World" / "Only Heaven Can Wait (For Love)"	Atlantic 7-89931	1983	
Merc And Monk	"Baby Face" (Short Version) / " Baby Face" (Instrumental Version)	Manhattan B50003	1985	
Merc And Monk	"Carried Away" / "Carried Away" (Instrumental)	Manhattan B50004	1985	
Anthony Aramouni feat Eric Mercury	"Bright Eyed Woman"	Anthony Aramouni	2019	Digital
Eric Mercury and the Soul Searchers	"Lonely Girl" / "Lonely Girl" Part 2	Sac 5-0001	2020	US Re-release
Eric Mercury and the Soul Searchers	"Lonely Girl" / "Lonely Girl" Part 2	Big Man Records BMR – 1006	2021	UK release ( Re-release)

=== Studio albums ===
List of albums, with selected chart positions
Title	Album details	Peak chart positions
Title	Album details	CAN
Electric Black Man	Released: 1969; Label: AVCO Embassy AVE-33001	—
Funky Sounds Nurtured in the Fertile Soil of Memphis That Smell of Rock	Released: 1971; Label: Enterprise ENS-1020	58
Love Is Taking Over	Released: 1973; Label: Enterprise ENS-1033	—
Eric Mercury	Released: 1975; Label: Mercury SRM 1-1026	—
Gimme a Call Sometime	Released: 1981; Label: Capitol ST-12166	—
"—" denotes items that did not chart or were not released.
