= Enterprise Records =

- Parent company: Stax Records
- Founded: 1967
- Defunct: 1975
- Status: Defunct
- Genre: Various
- Country of origin: United States

Enterprise Records was an American record label, started in 1967 as a subsidiary of Stax Records. Its best-known recording artist during its existence was Isaac Hayes, who secured a No. 1 R&B and pop crossover hit in 1971 with the soundtrack hit "Theme from Shaft". In addition to Hayes, Big Ben Atkins, Cliff Cochran, Connie Eaton, Maynard Ferguson, Little Sonny, O.B. McClinton, Eric Mercury and David Porter also recorded for the label.

== Background ==
Enterprise Records was started in late 1967 by Stax Records' executive vice-president Al Bell. The label was named after the USS Enterprise, the spaceship from Bell's favorite television show at the time, Star Trek.

Only a few months into Enterprise's existence, the Stax Records company underwent a significant number of shifts and changes. Otis Redding, an artist on Stax's Volt label and the company's biggest star, died in a plane crash in December 1967 alongside many members of Stax-signed band The Bar-Kays. In May 1968, Stax broke away from its distributor, Atlantic Records, following the latter's acquisition by Warner Bros.-Seven Arts the previous October - and Bell and Stax president Jim Stewart learning that a clause in their Atlantic contract gave Atlantic full ownership of its master recordings released between 1960 and 1967.

The Stax organization regrouped and became a subsidiary of Gulf+Western's Paramount Pictures, which would remain its parent company until 1970. The upper management of Stax remained the same, with Stewart staying on as president and Bell as executive vice-president. They were to work directly with Arnold D. Burk, who was the vice-president in charge of music operations for Paramount Pictures . In addition to their desire to expand the Enterprise label, they were looking to do the same with their pop-rock label, Hip Records. At the time, Enterprise was regarded as a jazz-folk label.

An example of the success Enterprise was having can be seen in the May 16, 1970 issue of Billboard, where the label had three albums on the Billboard Best Selling Soul Albums chart. The Isaac Hayes Movement (1970) by Isaac Hayes was at No. 1, Gritty, Groovy, & Gettin' It (1970) album by David Porter was at No. 4, and Hot Buttered Soul (1969) by Isaac Hayes was at No. 10. The two Isaac Hayes LPs were also at No. 1 and No. 6, respectively, in the Best Selling Jazz LP's chart that week.

== History ==
It was reported by Billboard in the magazine's June 29, 1968, issue that Maynard Ferguson had recently joined the Enterprise record label.

Albums on the Enterprise label that were "happening" as per Ed Ochs' Soul Sauce column in Billboard, September 4, 1971 included Shaft by Isaac Hayes, Victim of the Joke by David Porter, Funky Rock by Eric Mercury, and Black & Blue by Little Sonny. Also that year, the Patchouli album by Big Ben Atkins was released on Enterprise ENS-102.

It was reported in the May 12, 1973 issue of Billboard that Enterprise was in the process of signing Weldon Lane, a former Capitol artist. They had just released an album for O.B. McClinton and were rushing out a single of his. They had also purchased a master recording in Orland of Paige O'Brien (O'Brian), which resulted in the release of her single "Satisfied Woman". Local artist Dale Yard recorded a single in a session described as being done in the total "Memphis country sound". The single "Purple Cow" b/w "I'ma Goin' A Courtin'," which was released on Enterprise ENA-9068, was reviewed in the May 19 issue of Cash Box, with the reviewer saying "The lively carefree nature of the tune should find many a country fanatic whistling and stomping along with the beat. The label had also purchased some masters from the Capitol label. The first of them was a Roland Eaton recording. which was re-mixed and then released. Enterprise was also about to release a single by Birmingham artist Roger Hallmark, and an LP by Eddie Bond. At the time, the label's director of the country operation was Jerry Seabolt.

On the week of July 3, 1973, Live at the Sahara Tahoe, a recording of a live concert by Isaac Hayes, was the No. 1 entry for the second week on the Record World R&B LP chart.

It was reported by Billboard in the magazine's May 25, 1974, issue that Stax Records, via its Enterprise subsidiary, was expanding its country division. It had recently signed three artists to the label. The label's country promoter and coordinator, Merlin Littlefield, said there would be more to come. With the expansion, Bill Hickman and Carol Stevenson had taken up positions in the office. For some time, Enterprise's country division had O.B. McClinton as their only artist. The recent additions were Connie Eaton, who had been with Chart Records and the Atlanta GRC Records label, and Cliff Cochran, who would be produced by Joe Allison and Hank Cochran. Enterprise was using Larry Butler, who was an independent producer in Nashville, to handle most of the production and recording. In the same issue, Bill Williams reported in his Nashville Scene section that when Cliff Cochran was to cut his new single for the label, his cousin-in-law, Jeannie Seely would be joining him on harmony vocals. The label also thought they were getting Jan Howard, but she changed her mind and went to the Atlanta-based GRC label.

== See also ==
- List of record labels
