= Roy Dea =

- Born: 18 April 1940; Texas, United States
- Died: 18 August 1997 (aged 57)
- Occupations: Record producer, music publisher
- Years active: 1960s - 1990s

Roy Dea was a record producer who produced music for Country artists. He also produced some Rhythm and blues recordings early in his career.

== Background ==
Roy Dea (last name pronounced Day) was born in Texas on April 18, 1940.

Artists he worked with include, Johnny Rodriguez on his release, Pass Me By (If You're Only Passing Through)", Dickey Lee on his release, "9,999,999 Tears", Gary Stewart on his release, "She's Actin' Single (I'm Drinkin' Doubles)", and Randy Gurley on her releases "Don't Treat Me Like a Stranger" and "If I Ever".

It was Roy Dea who was responsible for Gary Stewart to sign up with RCA Records in 1973. Stewart had recorded a demo tape of Motown songs in a country style. Dea found the tape and encouraged Stewart to sign with RCA. With Stewart working with Dea, a series of good albums followed.

Prior to coming on board with RCA, Dea was working for the Mercury label.

== Career ==
Roy Dea produced the single, "The Hurt Won't Go Away" for Margie Hendrix which was released on Mercury in 1967.

At some stage, Dea became unsatisfied with working for the Mercury label. He moved to Shreveport. In 1970, he returned to Music City and worked with Sun Records. It was his friend and fellow record producer Jerry Kennedy who convinced him to come back to Mercury. This was reported in the March 14 issues of both Cash Box and Record World that Dea had joined the Mercury Record Corporation's A&R staff in Nashville. According to Kennedy, Dea was one of the few people he felt he could trust to handle the artists in his name and would be involved in both signing and producing country and r&b acts for the label. It was mentioned in the Record World article that Dea would be expanding the Mercury roster himself as well as taking on some of the production of the prformers that Kennedy was handling.

Johnny Rodriguez was a guitarist in Tom T. Hall's band. It was around 1972 that Hall took Rodriguez to the office of Roy Dea and Jerry Kennedy to audition for the producers at Mercury's Nashville division. Rodriguez performed songs, "I Can't Stop Loving You" and "If I’d Left It Up to You". After hearing his renditions, Dea signed him up immediately. According to the alancackett.com website, when Rodriguez was singing "I Can’t Stop Loving You", he broke into a Spanish verse which resulted in Dea being overcome by it.

It was in the early to mid-1970s that Roy Dea was hired by Jerry Bradley as a producer. This happened when Bradley joined RCA.

It was noted in the June 10, 1994 issue of Radio & Records that Roy Dea and Paul Randall of WSIX in Nashville had formed joint publishing companies, Blue Day Music (BMI) and Gray Music (ASCAP). The offices were located at 30 Music Square West, Ste, 155, Nashville, TN 37203.

Dea produced Johnny Rodriguez' album You Can Say That Again that was released on HighTone Records HCD 8073 in 1996.

== Hit productions (selective) ==
- 1974 - "Drinkin' Thing" by Gary Stewart
- 1974 - "Out of Hand" by Gary Stewart
- 1975 - "She's Actin' Single (I'm Drinkin' Doubles)" by Gary Stewart
- 1975 - "Rocky" by Dickey Lee
- 1977 - "May the Force Be with You Always" by Tom T. Hall
- 1978 - "What Have You Got to Lose" by Tom T. Hall
- 1979 - "Don't Treat Me Like a Stranger" by Randy Gurley
- 1979 - "If I Ever" by Randy Gurley
- 1979 - "The Old Side of Town" by Tom T. Hall

== Death ==
Roy Dea suffered a heart attack in Nashville on August 18, 1997. He died two days later on August 20 at age 57.
