= Juno Award for Breakthrough Artist of the Year =

Annual music award in Canada

The Juno Award for Breakthrough Artist of the Year is an annual award given by the Canadian Academy of Recording Arts and Sciences to the best new musician in Canada. The award has been given since 1974, when it was originally divided into separate awards for men and women under the names Most Promising Female Vocalist of the Year and Most Promising Male Vocalist of the Year. These two awards were merged in 1994 into Best New Solo Artist, which was then changed to New Artist of the Year in 2003, and finally changed to its current title beginning in 2013. The award was customarily presented by the Minister of Canadian Heritage.

The award was discontinued following the Juno Awards of 2024. At the following Juno Awards of 2025, it was merged with the sibling category for Breakthrough Group of the Year into a single category for Breakthrough Artist or Group of the Year.

== Recipients ==
=== Most Promising Female Vocalist of the Year and Most Promising Male Vocalist of the Year (1974–93) ===
Year	Most Promising Female Vocalist of the Year	Nominees	Most Promising Male Vocalist of the Year	Nominees	Refs.
1974	Cathy Young	Linda Brown; Donna Moon; Marie Claire Seguin; Donna Warner; Nancy White	Ian Thomas	James Leroy; Tom Middleton; Dave Nicol; Michael Tarry	
1975	Suzanne Stevens	Alexis Rose Radlin; Charity Brown; Debbie Fleming	Gino Vannelli	Bill King; Justin Paige; Keath Barrie; Paul Hann	
1976	Patricia Dahlquist	Lisa Hartt; Robin Moir; Shawne Jackson; Sylvia Tyson	Dan Hill	Bim; Bruce Miller; Lewis Furey; Raoul Duguay	
1977	Colleen Peterson	Chris Nielsen; Denise McCann; Gail Dahms; Patricia Anne McKinnon	Burton Cummings	Danny Hooper; Nestor Pistor; Roger Doucet; Wayne St. John	
1978	Lisa Dalbello	Alma Faye Brooks; Claudja Barry; Glory-Anne Carriere; Roxanne Goldade	David Bradstreet	Malcolm Tomlinson; Pat Travers; Peter Pringle; Walter Rossi	
1979	Claudja Barry	Carolyne Bernier; Denise McCann; Ronney Abramson; Roxanne Goldade	Nick Gilder	Marc Jordan; Martin Stevens; Pat Travers; Rick James	
1980	France Joli	Alma Faye Brooks; Karen Silver; Laura Vinson; Nana McLean	Walter Rossi	Bryan Adams; Freddie James; Gary Fjellgaard; Richard Stepp	
1981	Carole Pope	Dianne Heatherington; Laura Vinson; Michaele Jordana; Shari Ulrich	Graham Shaw	B. B. Gabor; Bryan Adams; Long John Baldry; Wayne Rostad	
1982	Shari Ulrich	Karen Silver; Rita Johns; Salome Bey; Terry Crawford	Eddie Schwartz	B. B. Gabor; Gary O'; Jim Byrnes; Peter Pringle	
1983	Lydia Taylor	Lee Aaron; Luba; Mary Lu Zahalan; Terry Crawford	Kim Mitchell	David Roberts; David Wilcox; Lawrence Gowan; Leroy Sibbles	
1984	Sherry Kean	Ann Mortifee; Diane Tell; Jane Siberry; Veronique Beliveau	Zappacosta	Johnnie Lovesin; LaBarge; Nash the Slash; Tim Ryan	
1985	k.d. lang	Belinda Metz; Connie Kaldor; Liberty Silver; Vanity	Paul Janz	Claude Dubois; Daniel Lavoie; Johnnie Lovesin; Johnny MacLeod	
1986	Kim Richardson	Chantal Condor; Francesca Gagnon; Sheree Jeacocke; Siobhan Crawley	Billy Newton-Davis	Doug Cameron; Michel Lemieux; Scott Merritt; Stan Meissner	
1987	Rita MacNeil	Céline Dion; Debbie Johnson; Heather Bishop; Nancy Martinez	Tim Feehan	Christopher Ward; Daniel Lavoie; David Gibson; Mark Korven	
No award ceremony was held in 1988
1989	Sass Jordan	Candi; Patti Jannetta; Lisa Lougheed; Michelle Wright	Colin James	Andrew Cash; Art Bergmann; Jeff Healey; Michael Breen	
1990	Alannah Myles	Anita Perras; Annette Ducharme; Mary Margaret O'Hara; Mitsou	Daniel Lanois	Neil Harnett; Ray Lyell; Roch Voisine; Rufus Wainwright	
1991	Sue Medley	Holly Cole; Jane Child; Lorraine Segato; Mae Moore; Patricia Conroy	Andy Curran	Bob Wiseman; Danny Brooks; Francis Martin; John James; Kenny MacLean	
1992	Alanis Morissette	Chrissy Steele; Darby Mills; Kerri Anderson; Meryn Cadell	Keven Jordan	Glen Stace; Lennie Gallant; Stephen Fearing; Wild T	
1993	Julie Masse	Lisa Brokop; Priscilla Wright; Sofia Shinas; Sue Foley	John Bottomley	Devon; Don Neilson; John McDermott; Steve Fox	

=== Best New Solo Artist (1994–2002) ===
Year	Winner	Nominees	Refs.
1994	Jann Arden	Charlie Major; Jim Witter; Mario Pelchat; Meryn Cadell	
1995	Susan Aglukark	Andrew Matheson; David Gogo; Éric Lapointe; Sara Craig	
1996	Ashley MacIsaac	Amanda Marshall; Kim Stockwood; Lara Fabian; Laura Smith	
1997	Terri Clark	Chantal Kreviazuk; Damhnait Doyle; Duane Steele; Wendy Lands	
1998	Holly McNarland	Amy Sky; Dayna Manning; Lhasa de Sela; Tariq	
1999	Melanie Doane	Bruce Guthro; Emm Gryner; Hayden; Tamia	
2000	Tal Bachman	Ivana Santilli; Jorane; Tara Lyn Hart; Tory Cassis	
2001	Nelly Furtado	Adam Gregory; Amanda Stott; j. englishman; Sarah Harmer	
2002	Hawksley Workman	Gabrielle Destroismaisons; Jelleestone; Maren Ord; Thrust	

=== New Artist of the Year (2003–2012) ===
Year	Winner	Nominees	Refs.
2003	Avril Lavigne	k-os; Sam Roberts; Sarah Slean; Shawn Desman	
2004	Michael Bublé	Barlow; Danny Michel; Kazzer; Kinnie Starr	
2005	Feist	Fefe Dobson; Keshia Chanté; Matt Dusk; Matt Mays	
2006	Daniel Powter	Divine Brown; Jonas; Martha Wainwright; Skye Sweetnam	
2007	Tomi Swick	Eva Avila; Melissa O'Neil; Neverending White Lights; Patrick Watson	
2008	Serena Ryder	Belly; Jeremy Fisher; Jill Barber; Justin Nozuka	
2009	Lights	Crystal Shawanda; Jessie Farrell; Kreesha Turner; Nikki Yanofsky	
2010	Drake	Carly Rae Jepsen; Danny Fernandes; Justin Bieber; Shiloh	
2011	Meaghan Smith	Basia Bulat; Bobby Bazini; Caribou; Hannah Georgas	
2012	Dan Mangan	Alyssa Reid; Diamond Rings; JRDN; Lindi Ortega	

=== Breakthrough Artist of the Year (2013–2024) ===
Year	Winner	Nominees	Refs.
2013	The Weeknd	Cold Specks; Grimes; Kira Isabella; Shawn Hook	
2014	Brett Kissel	Florence K; Tim Hicks; Tyler Shaw; Wake Owl	
2015	Kiesza	Glenn Morrison; Jess Moskaluke; Mac DeMarco; Shawn Mendes	
2016	Alessia Cara	Coleman Hell; Francesco Yates; Scott Helman; Tobias Jesso Jr.	
2017	Ruth B	Andy Shauf; Kaytranada; Jazz Cartier; Tory Lanez	
2018	Jessie Reyez	Allan Rayman; Charlotte Cardin; NAV; Virginia to Vegas	
2019	bülow	Grandson; Killy; Johnny Orlando; Meghan Patrick	
2020	Lennon Stella	bbno$; Ali Gatie; Alexandra Stréliski; Tenille Townes	
2021	JP Saxe	Ryland James; Tate McRae; Powfu; Curtis Waters	
2022	Jessia	347aidan; Faouzia; Pressa; Tesher	
2023	Preston Pablo	Dax; Devon Cole; RealestK; Rêve	
2024	Talk	Karan Aujla; Connor Price; Lu Kala; Shubh	

== See also ==
- Music of Canada
