= Clarence Horatius Miller =

American jazz/blues singer and bassist

- Also known as: Big Miller
- Born: December 18, 1922; Sioux City, Iowa, United States
- Died: June 9, 1992 (aged 69) Edmonton, Alberta, Canada
- Genres: Blues, Jump blues
- Occupation: Singer
- Instrument: Trombone
- Years active: 1949–1992
- Label: Columbia

Clarence Horatius "Big" Miller (December 18, 1922 – June 9, 1992) was an American jazz and blues singer and trombonist, chiefly associated with the Kansas City blues style.

== Biography ==
=== Early years ===
Miller was born in Sioux City and grew up in Topeka, Kansas. His mother was descended from black slaves and his father was a preacher, of mixed black and Lakota origin. He studied the trombone and bass in high school. Miller was 193 cm in height (6 ft., 3.5 inches) and weighed more than 115 kilograms (over 250 lb.). He acquired the nickname "Big" while playing football as a teenager.

His proximity to Kansas City influenced his style. He joined the Lionel Hampton Orchestra before his first full-time professional job with the Jay McShann Orchestra. It was during this time that his vocal talents began to be recognized. He won fame as a "blues shouter", a singer whose voice was powerful enough, without microphone amplification, for an auditorium—even with big band accompaniment. He also occasionally performed on trombone.

He was the Fletcher Henderson Reunion Orchestra during the 1950s. He recorded for Savoy Records early in his career, including with The Five Pennies as backing musicians. His jazz activities also included work with Count Basie and Duke Ellington.

As a vocalist, Miller first rose to national prominence at the 1958 Newport Jazz Festival where he appeared with a group led by trombonist Bob Brookmeyer. This led to a New York session with Brookmeyer's ensemble that was released on a well-reviewed LP, The Kansas City Sound, which has since been re-released on CD. After performing with John Hendricks's revue, The Evolution of the Blues, Miller signed with Columbia Records and released several full-length albums, including Big Miller Sings, Twists, Shouts and Preaches (1962).

=== Edmonton ===
Discouraged by racial tensions in the mainland United States, he began touring other countries and lived for a while in Australia and then Hawaii. In the 1970s Miller toured with Big Joe Turner. Miller found himself stranded in Vancouver when one of his tours ran out of money. He travelled around Western Canada and in 1970 settled in Edmonton, Alberta. He became a Canadian citizen in 1973 and lived there for the rest of his life, working with local musician Tommy Banks, and covering "Big Yellow Taxi" with the song's composer, Alberta-born Joni Mitchell. Miller played a major role in the growth of the Edmonton Jazz Society, which began in the late 1970s, and taught at the Banff Centre for Fine Arts. Miller helped to organize Edmonton's Jazz City Festival.

He was the subject of a 1980 documentary "Big and the Blues", produced through the National Film Board of Canada.

He had a short side career as an actor, appearing in Big Meat Eater (1982), A Name for Evil (1973), and a cameo in the comedy It's a Mad, Mad, Mad, Mad World.

"Big" Miller died in 1992 in Edmonton at the age of 69, of a heart attack.

== Awards ==
- 1979 Juno Award – Best Jazz album: Jazz Canada Montreux 1978 (Tommy Banks Big Band with Guest Big Miller)

== Legacy ==
Tributes to Miller include a piano solo piece by Jay McShann entitled "Big Miller's Blues", and a track by the Canadian band Shuffle Demons called "Never Be the Same: Big Miller Blues".

The city of Edmonton named the park outside the Yardbird Suite jazz club after Miller.

== Discography ==
=== As leader ===
- Did You Ever Hear the Blues? (United Artists, 1959)
- Revelations and the Blues (Columbia, 1961)
- Sings, Twists, Shouts and Preaches with Bob Florence (Columbia, 1962)
- "Big" Miller (Radio Canada International, 1978)
- Live from Calgary (Black Bear, 1982)
- Live at Athabasca University (Stony Plain, 1990)
- Last of the Blues Shouters (Southland, 1992)
- Big Miller and the Tommy Banks Band and Quartet (Century II, 1997)

=== As guest ===
- Tommy Banks, Jazz Canada Montreux 1978 (Radio Canada International, 1978)
- Rex Stewart, Henderson Homecoming (United Artists, 1959)
