= Juno Awards of 1979 =

Canadian music awards ceremony

- Date: 21 March 1979
- Venue: Harbour Castle Hilton Hotel, Toronto, Ontario
- Hosted by: Burton Cummings

Television/radio coverage
- Network: CBC

The Juno Awards of 1979, representing Canadian music industry achievements of the previous year, were awarded on 21 March 1979 in Toronto at a ceremony hosted by Burton Cummings at the Harbour Castle Hilton Convention Centre.

Claudja Barry and Ginette Reno were live performers on the ceremony telecast, seen on CBC Television from 9:30pm Eastern Time. Gino Vannelli and Chilliwack provided videotaped performances.

Pierre Trudeau attended the ceremonies, the first time a Canadian Prime Minister did so. He introduced Hank Snow into the Canadian Music Hall of Fame.

Cummings and Dan Hill led nominations with four each. In an unusual move, Hill was nominated in the "Composer of the Year" category for "Sometimes When We Touch" for the second time as it had sold more than 75,000 copies after the first award at the 1978 Juno ceremony.

This was the first year when Gordon Lightfoot failed to pick up an award, and Anne Murray was not present to claim her two awards. The CBC television broadcast was seen by an estimated 1,827,000 viewers which was down from the year before.

== Nominees and winners ==
=== Female Vocalist of the Year ===
Winner: Anne Murray

Other nominees:

- Carroll Baker
- Lisa Dal Bello
- Patsy Gallant
- Joni Mitchell

=== Male Vocalist of the Year ===
Winner: Gino Vannelli

Other nominees:

- Burton Cummings
- Dan Hill
- Gordon Lightfoot
- Neil Young

=== Most Promising Female Vocalist of the Year ===
Winner: Claudja Barry

Other nominees:

- Ronney Abramson
- Carolyne Bernier
- Roxanne Goldade
- Denise McCann

=== Most Promising Male Vocalist of the Year ===
Winner: Nick Gilder

Other nominees:

- Rick James
- Marc Jordan
- Martin Stevens
- Pat Travers

=== Group of the Year ===
Winner: Rush

Other nominees:

- Chilliwack
- Prism
- Triumph
- Trooper

=== Most Promising Group of the Year ===
Winner: Doucette

Other nominees:

- Max Webster
- Streetheart
- Teaze
- Zon

=== Composer of the Year ===
Winner: Dan Hill (Co-composer with Barry Mann), "Sometimes When We Touch" by Dan Hill

Other nominees:

- Burton Cummings, "Break It to Them Gently" by Burton Cummings
- Nick Gilder & James McCulloch, "Hot Child in the City" by Nick Gilder
- Frank Mills, "Music Box Dancer" by Frank Mills
- Brian Smith & Ra McGuire, "Raise a Little Hell" by Trooper

=== Country Female Vocalist of the Year ===
Winner: Carroll Baker

=== Country Male Vocalist of the Year ===
Winner: Ronnie Prophet

=== Country Group or Duo of the Year ===
Winner: The Good Brothers

=== Folk Singer of the Year ===
Winner: Murray McLauchlan

Other nominees:

- Bruce Cockburn
- Dan Hill
- Gordon Lightfoot
- Valdy

=== Instrumental Artist of the Year ===
Winner: Liona Boyd

Other nominees:

- André Gagnon
- Hagood Hardy
- Frank Mills
- Black Light Orchestra

=== Producer of the Year ===
Winner: Gino Vannelli, Joe Vannelli & Ross Vannelli, Brother to Brother by Gino Vannelli

Other nominees:

- Matthew McCauley & Fred Mollin, Frozen in the Night by Dan Hill & McCluskey by David McCluskey
- Jack Richardson, Richard T. Bear by Richard T. Bear
- Terry Brown & Rush, Hemispheres by Rush
- Bob Segarini, Gotta Have Pop by Bob Segarini

=== Recording Engineer of the Year ===
Winner: Ken Friesen, Let's Keep It That Way by Anne Murray

Other nominees:

- Rick Capreol & Jeff Smith, Special Way by Aura
- David Greene, Unexplored Territory by Canadian Brass
- Andrew Hermant, Frozen in the Night by Dan Hill
- Mike Jones, The Cooper Brothers by The Cooper Brothers

=== Canadian Music Hall of Fame ===
Winner: Hank Snow

== Nominated and winning albums ==
=== Best Selling Album ===
Winner: Dream of a Child, Burton Cummings

Other nominees:

- Carroll Baker, 20 Country Classics
- Gordon Lightfoot, Endless Wire
- Trooper, Thick as Thieves
- Rush, Hemispheres

=== Best Album Graphics ===
Winner: Alan Gee & Greg Lawson, Madcats by Madcats

Other nominees:

- James Hill, The Candelight & Wine Album compilation by CHFI 98.1
- James O'Mara, See Forever Eyes by Prism
- Bob Kroll, Unexplored Territory by Canadian Brass
- William Roberto Wilson, Maneige by Maneige
- Myron Zabol & Gary Muth, Meanwhile Back in Paris by Streetheart

=== Best Children's Album ===
Winner: There's a Hippo in My Tub, Anne Murray

=== Best Classical Album of the Year ===
Winner: Hindemith; Das Marienleben, Glenn Gould and Roxolana Roslak

- A Baroque Bouquet — Toronto Baroque Trio
- First Lady of the Guitar — Liona Boyd
- Janacek Taras Bulba — Toronto Symphony Orchestra, Andrew Davis
- The Orford String Quartet — Orford String Quartet

=== Best Selling International Album ===
Winner: Saturday Night Fever, Bee Gees

=== Best Jazz Album ===
Winner: Jazz Canada Montreux 1978, Tommy Banks Big Band with Guest "Big" Miller

- Big Band Jazz, Vol. II — Humber College Jazz Ensemble
- Things Are Looking Up — Moe Koffman
- Bones Blues — Pete Magadini
- More Than Ever — Ted Moses

=== Comedy Album of the Year ===
Winner: The Air Farce Comedy Album, The Air Farce Other nominees:

- Alden Diehl, Fight On
- Nestor Pistor, Best of Nestor Pistor
- Nestor Pistor, Nestor Pistor for Prime Minister
- Nancy White, Civil Service Songwriter

== Nominated and winning releases ==
=== Best Selling Single ===
Winner: "Hot Child in the City", Nick Gilder

- Burton Cummings, "Break It to Them Gently"
- Dan Hill, "Sometimes When We Touch"
- Anne Murray, "You Needed Me"
- Martin Stevens, "Love Is in the Air"

=== Best Selling International Single ===
Winner: "You're the One That I Want", John Travolta & Olivia Newton-John

== Bibliography ==
- LeBlanc, Larry. (2010). Music from far and wide: Celebrating 40 years of the Juno Awards. Key Porter Books Limited, Toronto. ISBN 978-1-55470-339-5
