= Burquitlam =

Burquitlam is a portmanteau of Burnaby and Coquitlam, two cities in British Columbia, Canada.

It can refer to:

- Burquitlam, British Columbia
- Burquitlam Station, part of the Millennium Line
- Burquitlam (electoral district), former provincial electoral district
- Port Moody-Burquitlam, provincial electoral district
