= Under Heaven Over Hell =

Studio album by Streetheart
- Released: 1979
- Studio: Le Studio, Morin Heights, Quebec
- Genre: Rock
- Length: 37:25
- Label: Atlantic Records
- Producer: Manny Charlton

Streetheart chronology
Meanwhile Back in Paris... (1978)	Under Heaven Over Hell (1979)	Quicksand Shoes (1980)

Singles from Under Heaven Over Hell
- 1. "Here Comes the Night" Released: 1979; 2. "Hollywood" Released: 1979; 3. "Under My Thumb" Released: 1979

Professional ratings
Review scores
Source	Rating
AllMusic	2/5 stars

Under Heaven Over Hell is the second studio album by Canadian rock band Streetheart, released in 1979. The band's covers of Under My Thumb (The Rolling Stones), and Here Comes the Night (Them), both charted in Canada. In December 1979, Under Heaven Over Hell was certified Platinum in Canada (in excess of 100,000 copies sold). This was the second and last Streetheart album to feature Matt Frenette after he left to join Paul Dean in Loverboy.

== Track listing ==
All songs written by Streetheart unless otherwise noted.

1. "Hollywood" - 3:32
2. "Main Street" (Paul Dean, Kenny Shields) - 3:47
3. "Fight to Survive" - 3:48
4. "Baby's Got a Gun - 3:16
5. "Dreaded Dotted Line" (Daryl Gutheil, Shields, Dean) - 4:27
6. "Star" - 3:53
7. "Whose Turn Is It Tonight" (Dean, Shields, Matt Frenette) - 4:30
8. "Here Comes the Night" (Bert Berns) - 3:49
9. "Under My Thumb" (Jagger-Richards) - 6:38

== Personnel ==
Streetheart

- Kenny Shields - lead vocals, percussion
- Ken "Spider" Sinnaeve - bass, backing vocals
- Daryl Gutheil - keyboards, backing vocals
- Matthew Frenette - drums, backing vocals
- John Hannah - guitar, backing vocals

Production

- Nick Blagona - engineer
- Gary Muth - executive producer
- Manny Charlton - producer
