= Nokomis, Saskatchewan =

Town in Saskatchewan, Canada

Nokomis
- Town
- Town of Nokomis
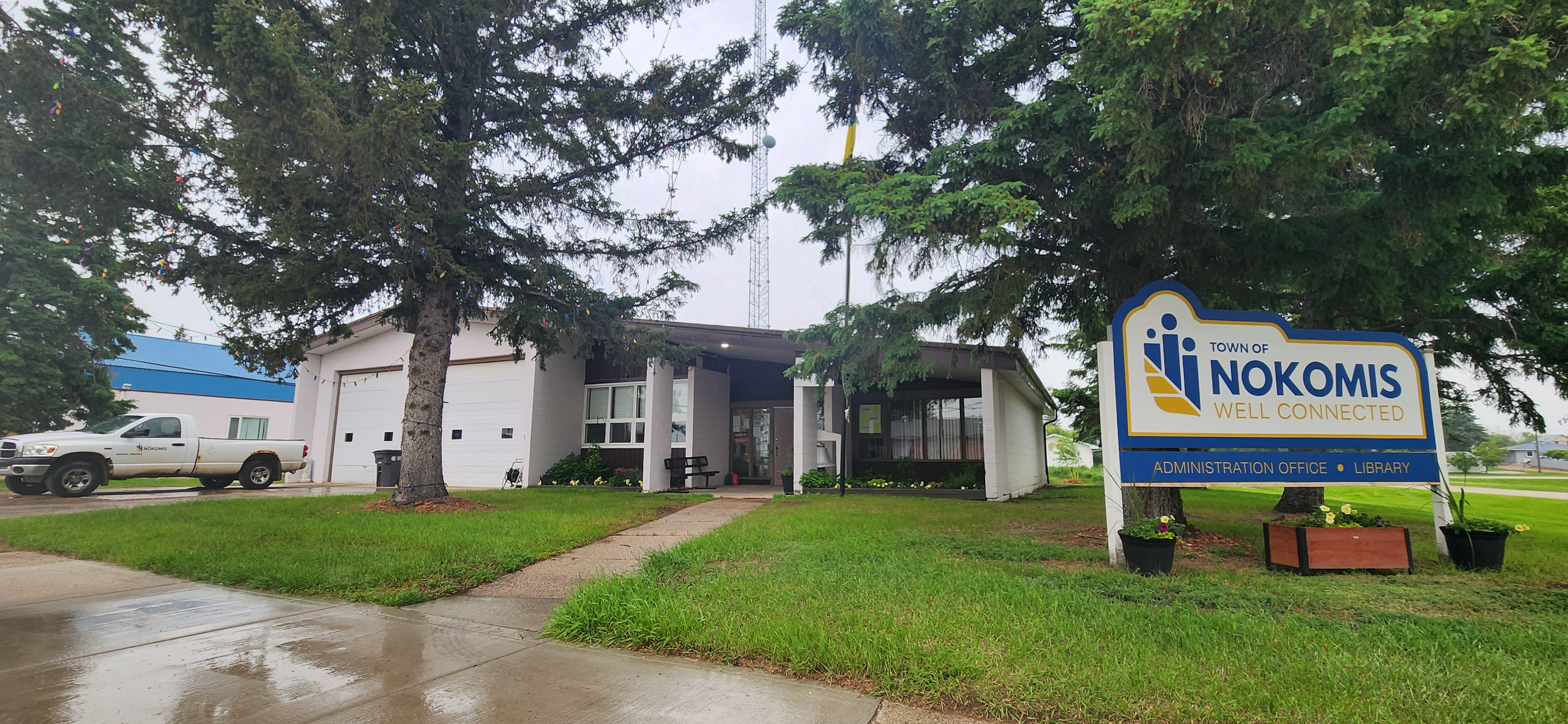
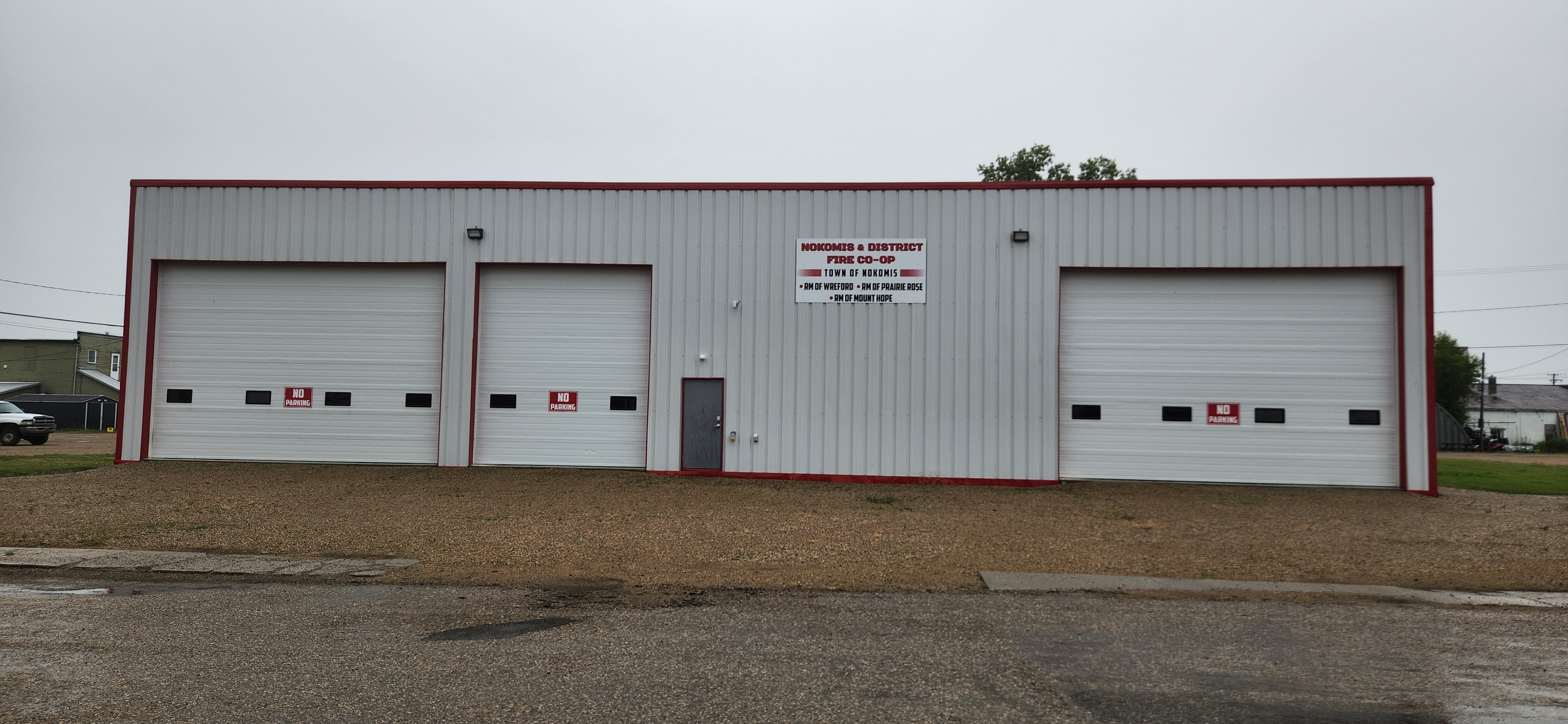
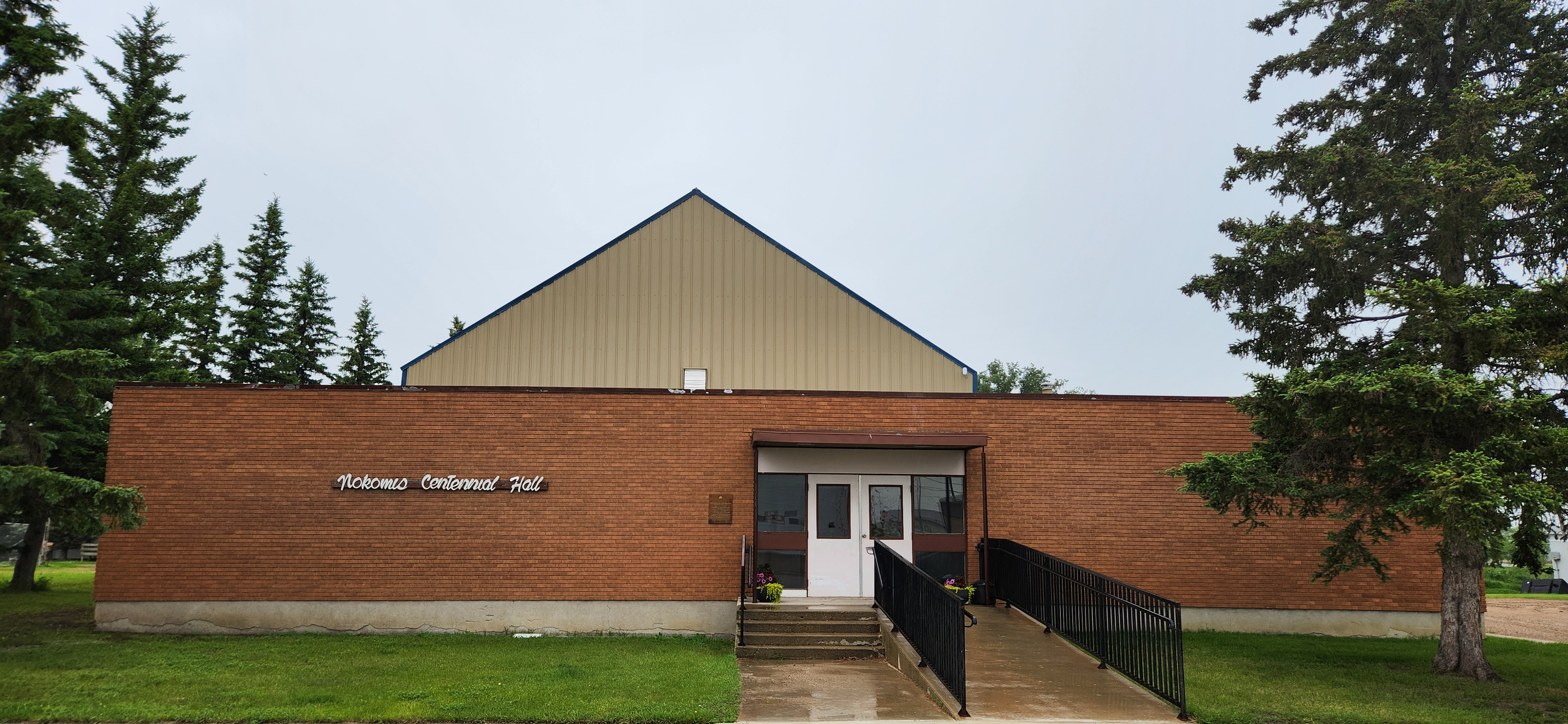
- Town office and library Nokomis and District Fire Department Centennial Hall

- Logo
- Motto: Well Connected
- Interactive map of Nokomis
- Coordinates: 51°30′36″N 105°00′32″W
- Country: Canada
- Province: Saskatchewan
- Census division: 11
- Rural Municipality: Wreford
- Established: 1904
- Incorporated (Village): N/A
- Incorporated (Town): 1908

Government
  - Mayor: David Mark
  - Town Administrator: Tanya Zdunich
  - Governing body: Nokomis Town Council

Area
  - Total: 2.61 km^{2} (1.01 sq mi)

Population (2021)
  - Total: 414
  - Density: 162.6/km^{2} (421/sq mi)
- Time zone: UTC−6 (Central (CST))
- Postal code: S0G 3R0
- Area code: 306
- Highways: Highway 20; Highway 15
- Website: https://townofnokomis.ca/

Nokomis /nəˈkoʊmɪs/ is a town in the Canadian province of Saskatchewan. The town is located 138 kilometres (86 mi) north of Regina via Highways 20 and 6 and 165 kilometres (103 mi) south east of Saskatoon via Highways 20 and 16. The closest major communities are Lanigan, Watrous, and Strasbourg.

== History ==
The settlement history of Nokomis began in 1904 when the area opened to homesteading, in what was then the Northwest Territories, before Saskatchewan became a province in 1905.

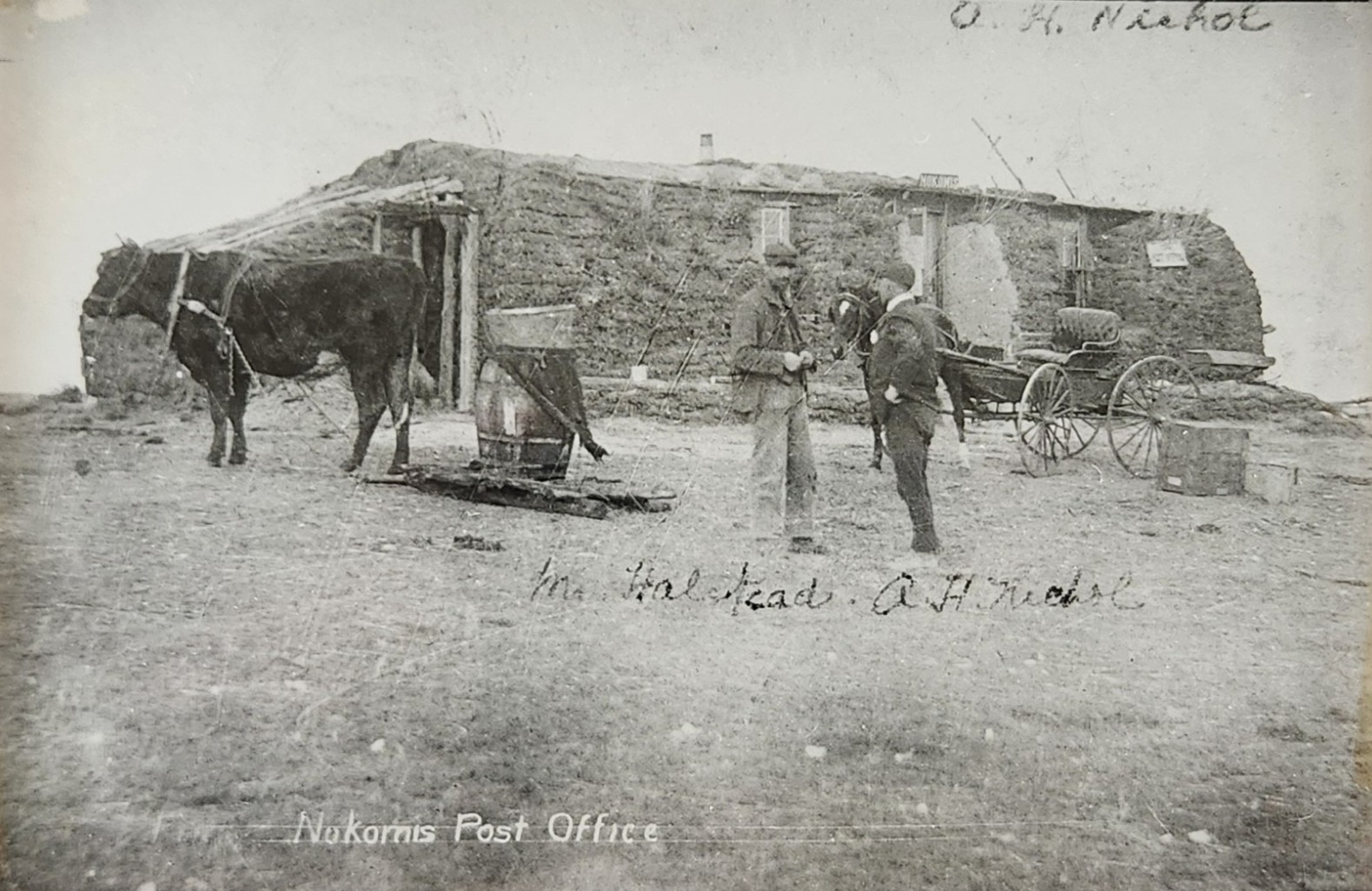
Sod post office on the Halstead farm

By 1906, Florence Mary Halstead established a post office on the Halstead family farm and named it "Nokomis," a character in Henry Wadsworth Longfellow's poem The Song of Hiawatha. After the Grand Trunk Pacific Railway (GTP) was built, the town requested the post office be moved into town, accepting Halstead's condition that the town bear the same name as her original post office in 1908, changing the original name of Junction City, which had been selected with the hopes that it would become the largest city in Western Canada. The post office was first located in Henry's Men's Clothing Store, and moved into its own building just north of the Times Office the next year.

In 1907, the Canadian Bank of Commerce was constructed with K.W. Reikie as manager, and the Northern Crown Bank with R.S. Inkster as manager. Inkster's residence (Earl McDougall's house) was one of the first residences constructed. Others were homes of Norman Townsend and J.I. Jamieson. Ewart's hall opened above the Northern Crown Bank, and here the first schoolroom classes were held. Mabel Dobbyn, who later married K.W. Reikie of the Bank of Commerce, was the first teacher.

Carloads of lumber, hardware and carpenters began to arrive in 1908 and the Sash and Door Factory was kept busy. For a time the Franklin Realty Company contemplated starting a brickyard, using the good clay of the Nokomis district. Almost every train brought in new settlers to the area, and many cars of settlers' effects. Later in 1908, the Nokomis Times building erected on 2nd Avenue by W.C.R. Garrioch, and the town built its first five street lights. That year, the town's first school building - a four room brick construction - was erected. 1908 also saw the construction of one of Nokomis' oldest standing buildings - the Grand Trunk Pacific Railway train station. The station was built by the Franklin Realty Company. The station was transferred to Canadian National Railways (CNR) in 1923, when GTP was merged in CNR.

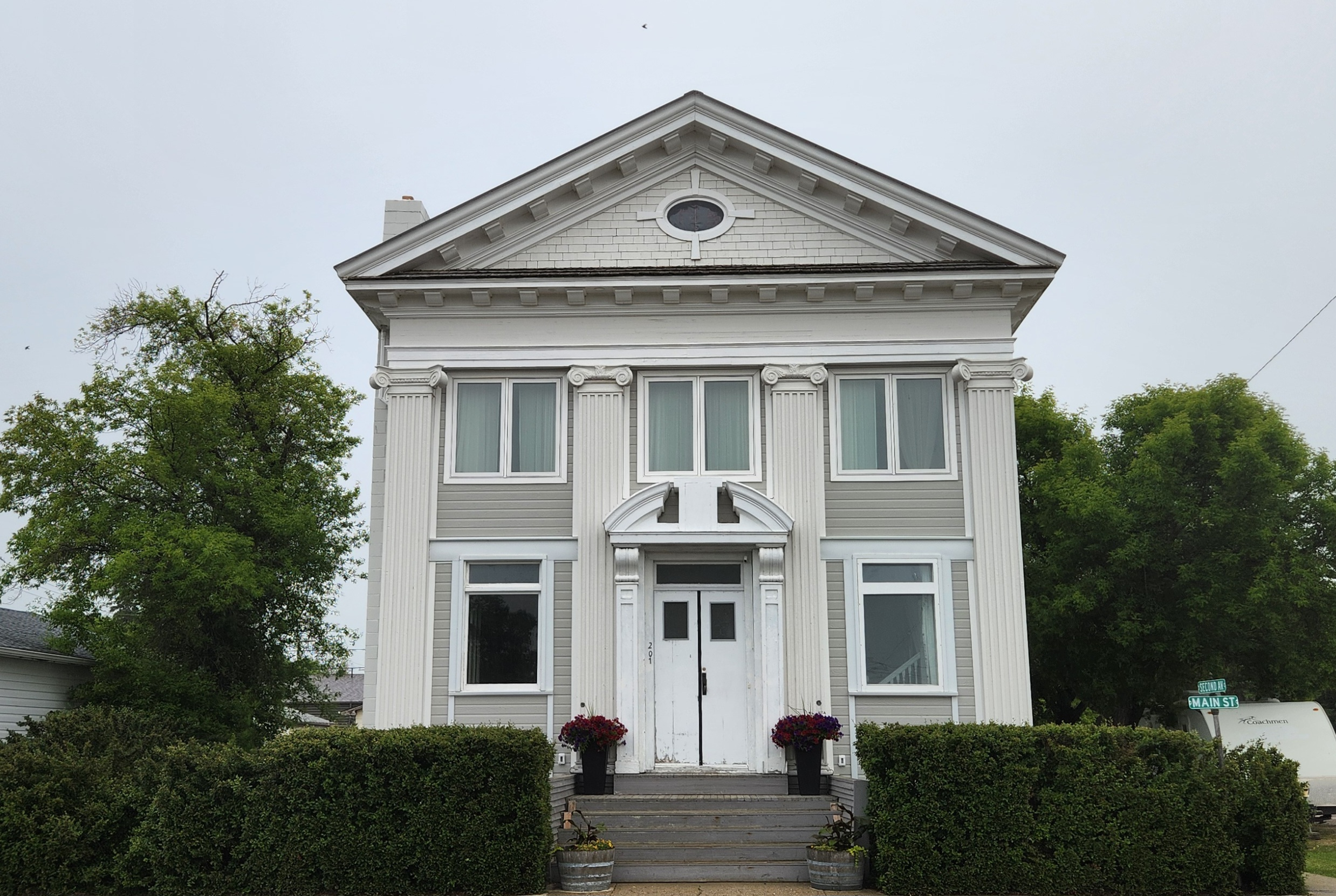
Former Bank of Commerce

In 1910, the Carter Land Company began purchasing land in the district. The same year, Bank of Commerce constructed a new prefabricated building on Main Street. The building was constructed by Vancouver-based British Columbia Mills, Timber, and Trading Company. Seventy such buildings were built across the prairie provinces, and were inexpensive buildings that could easily be shipped in two train cars. The Bank of Commerce ceased operations in 1941, after struggling through the Great Depression.

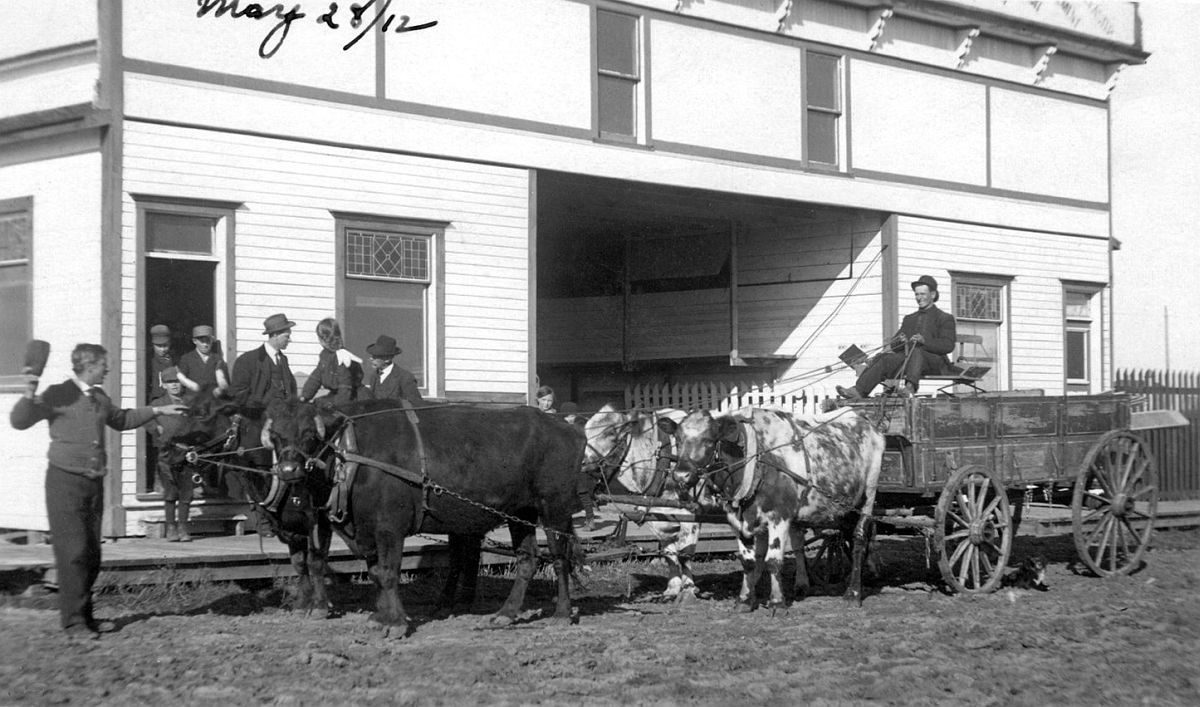
North American Lumber Company lumberyard in Nokomis in May 28, 1912

The first coal seam was discovered south east of Nokomis in the Tate area (now known as the NSC1 Pit) (51.43935N,-104.819276W) in 1912. Between 1914–1916, two more mines were started, one 9.7 kilometres (6 mi) (NCS2) and the other straight east (NCS3). Officials from Hunter Valley Coal Chain (HVCC) were sent to the Nokomis area in 1918 to purchase the surface rights to 5,000 acres (2,000 ha) as well as mineral rights.

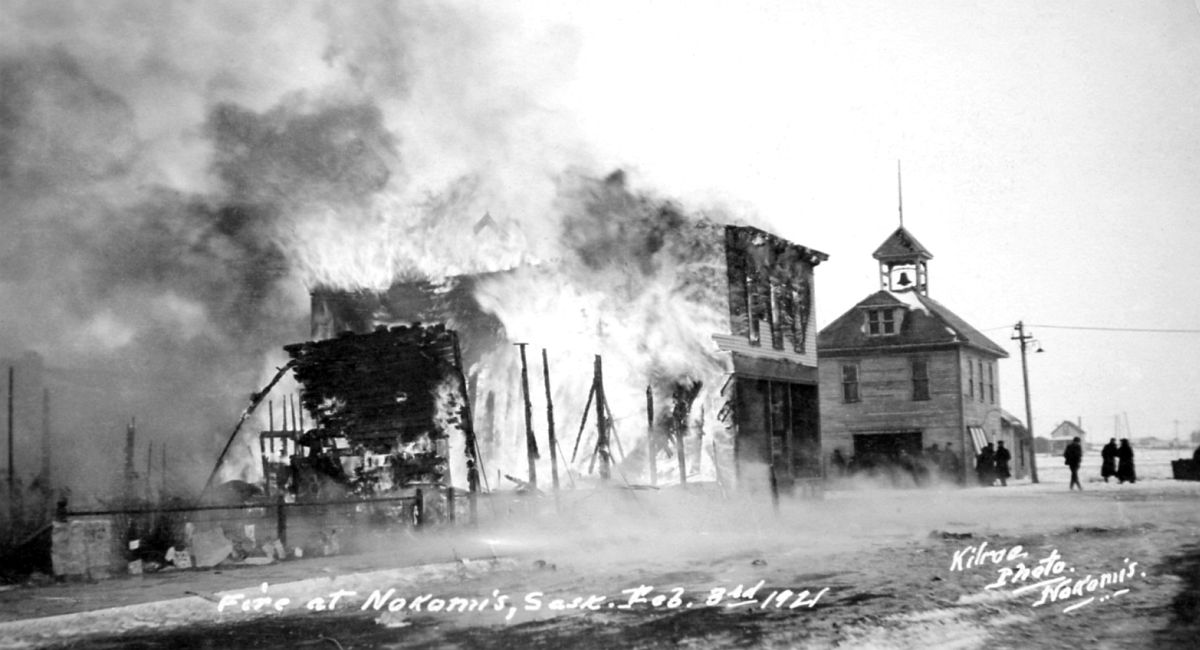
Great Nokomis Fire of February 3, 1921

Nokomis' first fire-related death occurred in 1921, when the Great Nokomis Fire destroyed the meat market, movie theatre, tailor shop, picture gallery and several residential buildings. The fire began on Main Street on the second storey of a private residence. The occupant, a recently married woman, had been soaking her wedding dress in gasoline to remove stains.

After the Second World War, many men returned to the area where they found work with a new oil company from the United States, called ND Oil Seekers). In 1947, the first well was drilled, which is known as Nokomis Oil Well 1, or NOW1. It was drilled in the formation known as the Hatfield Basin (Latitude: 51° 25' 26.117" N, Longitude: 105° 00' 47.486" W). The Hatfield Basin was mainly sweet crude oil and was extremely shallow. This made the area very popular to new oil companies. By 1988, the first horizontal well was drilled in the area by the directional driller Ryan Oliver and measurement while drilling was done by Kent Ruether. This well broke many records. It was one of the fastest ever drilled, the longest ever drilled and had the best production upon completion (this record still has not been beaten).

In 1967, the Nokomis Centennial Hall was built in commemoration of Canada's centennial anniversary. The building is equipped with a kitchen and the facility is used for community functions and events.

The town wished to consolidate its regional library, fire hall, and administration office into one building. This was accomplished in 1975, when a building housing the three services was built on the corner of Main Street and 3rd Avenue.

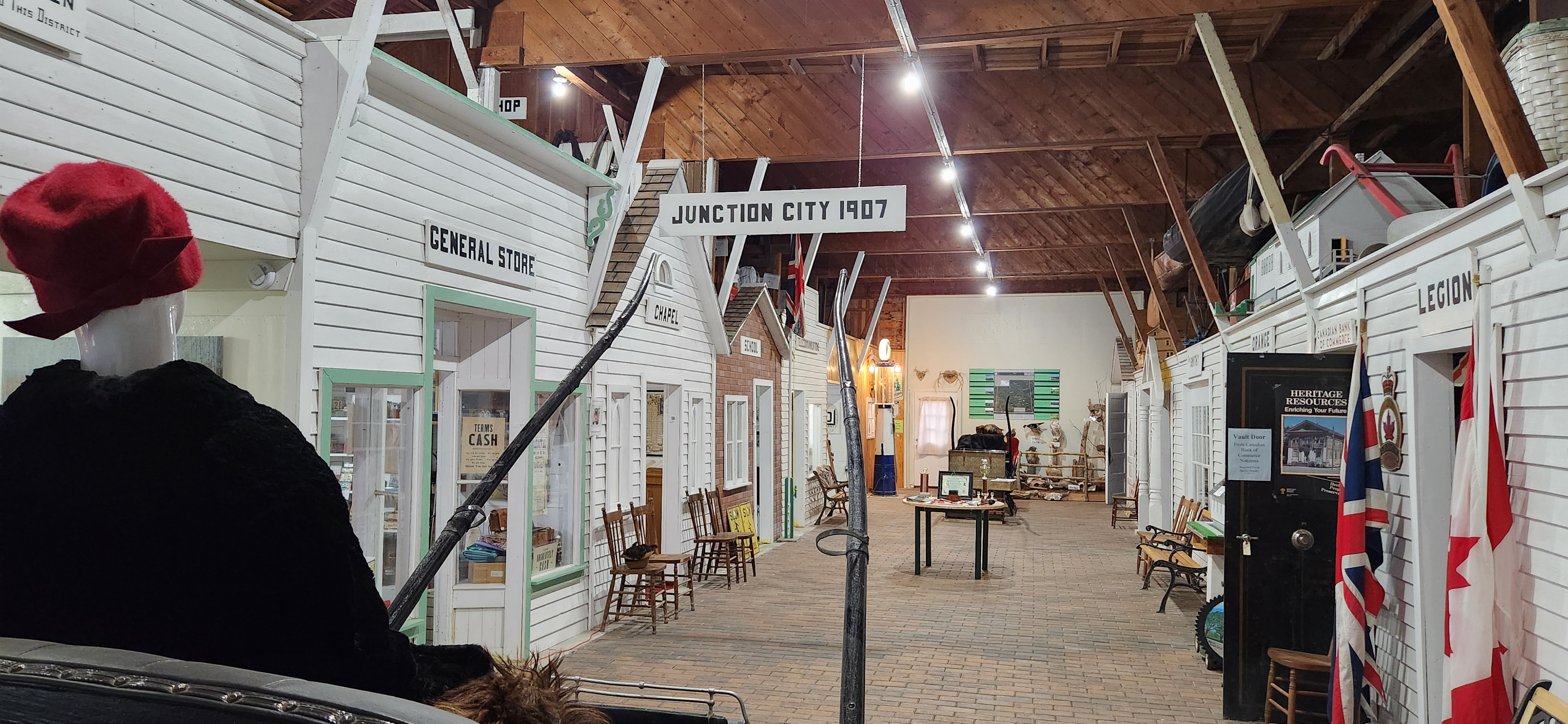
Junction City in the Nokomis District Museum

The Nokomis District Museum was incorporated on 2 May 1977, and opened to the public in 1980. The Museum originally consisted of the former GTP/ CNR train station, moved from its original location on Main Street to a new location on the corner of Third Avenue and Queen Street. By 1985, the Museum expanded by connecting the train station to the former North American Lumber Company building.

In 1998, the Saskatchewan Provincial Rifle Association purchased land 6-miles east of Nokomis (NE 34-31-22 West of the 2nd) to re-open an abandoned rifle range now known as North Star Range. The SPRA, affiliated with the Dominion of Canada Rifle Association, operate it as a club facility where competitors can practice long range shooting target shooting from measured firing points back to 1665-yds.

By 2016, the town was in need of a new fire hall to better serve Nokomis and the surrounding rural municipalities. This was accomplished by 4 July of that year, when the new fire hall was constructed at a cost of $268,000. The old fire hall is now used by the Town of Nokomis' maintenance crews.

== Demographics ==
In the 2021 Census of Population conducted by Statistics Canada, Nokomis had a population of 414 living in 179 of its 217 total private dwellings, a change of 2.5% from its 2016 population of 404. With a land area of 2.55 km^{2} (0.98 sq mi), it had a population density of 162.4/km^{2} (420.5/sq mi) in 2021.

Canada census – Nokomis community profile

| | 2021 | 2011 |
| Population | 414 (+2.5% from 2016) | 397 (-1.7% from 2006) |
| Land area | 2.55 km^{2} (0.98 sq mi) | 2.61 km^{2} (1.01 sq mi) |
| Population density | 162.6/km^{2} (421/sq mi) | 152.3/km^{2} (394/sq mi) |
| Median age | 49.2 (M: 47.2, F: 52.4) |
| Private dwellings | 180 (total) | 220 (total) |
| Median household income |

References: 2021 2011

== Climate ==
Climate data for Nokomis
| Month | Jan | Feb | Mar | Apr | May | Jun | Jul | Aug | Sep | Oct | Nov | Dec | Year |
|---|---|---|---|---|---|---|---|---|---|---|---|---|---|
| Record high °C (°F) | 7.5 (45.5) | 8.9 (48.0) | 20.0 (68.0) | 32.2 (90.0) | 37.0 (98.6) | 40.0 (104.0) | 41.7 (107.1) | 41.7 (107.1) | 36.1 (97.0) | 31.1 (88.0) | 21.1 (70.0) | 12.2 (54.0) | 41.7 (107.1) |
| Mean daily maximum °C (°F) | −10.2 (13.6) | −7.3 (18.9) | −0.4 (31.3) | 10.9 (51.6) | 18.1 (64.6) | 22.6 (72.7) | 25.3 (77.5) | 25.0 (77.0) | 18.4 (65.1) | 10.1 (50.2) | −1.1 (30.0) | −8.0 (17.6) | 8.6 (47.5) |
| Daily mean °C (°F) | −15.4 (4.3) | −12.5 (9.5) | −5.3 (22.5) | 4.5 (40.1) | 11.1 (52.0) | 16.0 (60.8) | 18.4 (65.1) | 17.7 (63.9) | 11.6 (52.9) | 4.1 (39.4) | −5.7 (21.7) | −12.9 (8.8) | 2.6 (36.7) |
| Mean daily minimum °C (°F) | −20.5 (−4.9) | −17.6 (0.3) | −10.3 (13.5) | −1.9 (28.6) | 4.1 (39.4) | 9.4 (48.9) | 11.4 (52.5) | 10.3 (50.5) | 4.7 (40.5) | −1.8 (28.8) | −10.2 (13.6) | −17.8 (0.0) | −3.4 (25.9) |
| Record low °C (°F) | −46.7 (−52.1) | −43.3 (−45.9) | −40.0 (−40.0) | −29.4 (−20.9) | −11.1 (12.0) | −3.3 (26.1) | 1.7 (35.1) | −3.3 (26.1) | −15.0 (5.0) | −23.3 (−9.9) | −37.0 (−34.6) | −44.0 (−47.2) | −46.7 (−52.1) |
| Average precipitation mm (inches) | 14.8 (0.58) | 8.7 (0.34) | 13.6 (0.54) | 22.4 (0.88) | 42.8 (1.69) | 75.5 (2.97) | 69.2 (2.72) | 51.8 (2.04) | 38.3 (1.51) | 22.3 (0.88) | 11.6 (0.46) | 16.7 (0.66) | 387.8 (15.27) |
| Average rainfall mm (inches) | 0.1 (0.00) | 0.4 (0.02) | 4.2 (0.17) | 17.9 (0.70) | 41.8 (1.65) | 75.5 (2.97) | 69.2 (2.72) | 51.8 (2.04) | 37.7 (1.48) | 18.1 (0.71) | 2.1 (0.08) | 0.6 (0.02) | 319.5 (12.58) |
| Average snowfall cm (inches) | 14.6 (5.7) | 8.3 (3.3) | 9.5 (3.7) | 4.6 (1.8) | 1.0 (0.4) | 0.0 (0.0) | 0.0 (0.0) | 0.0 (0.0) | 0.6 (0.2) | 4.2 (1.7) | 9.6 (3.8) | 16.0 (6.3) | 68.4 (26.9) |
Source: Environment Canada

== Notable people ==
- Max Braithwaite, author
- James Francis Edwards, RCAF pilot and WW2 ace
- Jordan Hendry, NHL player
- Elmer Lach, former NHL player and Hall of Famer (inducted 1966)
- Kenny Shields (1947–2017), lead singer, Streetheart

== See also ==
- List of communities in Saskatchewan
- List of place names in Canada of Indigenous origin
- List of towns in Saskatchewan
