= International Achievement =

International Achievement may refer to:

- Juno International Achievement Award
- New Zealand Music Award for International Achievement
