= Jazz Canada Montreux 1978 =

Live album by Tommy Banks Big Band with Guest Big Miller
- Released: 1978
- Genre: Jazz
- Label: RCI

Jazz Canada Montreux 1978 is an album by Tommy Banks Big Band with guest Big Miller, which was released in 1978 by Radio Canada International. It won the 1979 Juno Award for Best Jazz Album.
