= Streetheart (Streetheart album) =

Studio album by Streetheart
- Released: 1982
- Studio: Amber Studios, Toronto
- Genre: Rock
- Length: 39:40
- Label: Capitol Records
- Producer: George Semkiw, Streetheart

Streetheart chronology
Action – The Best of Streetheart (1981)	Streetheart (1982)	Live After Dark (1983)

Streetheart is the self-titled and fifth studio album by Canadian rock band Streetheart, released in 1982. The album features some of the band's best known songs, including What Kind of Love is This, Snow White, and Look in Your Eyes. Streetheart would prove to be the band's most successful album; in 2009 Streetheart would be certified Double Platinum in Canada (in excess of 200,000 copies sold).

== Track listing ==
All songs are written by Kenny Shields, Ken Sinnaeve, Daryl Gutheil, and Jeff Neill

1. "Without Your Love" – 5:03
2. "Mad as Hell" – 3:40
3. "Miss Plaza Suite" – 5:39
4. "Wired" – 3:13
5. "What Kind of Love is This" – 3:48
6. "Snow White" – 3:55
7. "Look in Your Eyes" – 4:49
8. "Ain't in No Hurry" – 5:00
9. "One More Time" – 4:33

== Personnel ==
Streetheart

- Kenny Shields – lead vocals, percussion
- Daryl Gutheil – keyboards, backing vocals
- Jeff Neill – guitar, backing vocals
- Ken 'Spider' Sinnaeve – bass
- Bob "Herb" Ego – drums

Production

- George Semkiw – producer, engineer
- Paul Bonish – assistant engineer
- Ralph Watts – engineer
- Terry DiMonte and Tom Powell – art direction
- Deborah Samuel – band photography
- Russ Mitchell – lyrical arrangement
