= Paradax Records =

Los Angeles music record label

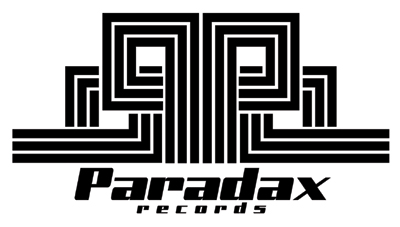
Paradax Records

Paradax Records is a dance music record label based in Los Angeles, California. Paradax's motto is "Nothing Over 126bpm". This bpm (beats per minute) designator signifies that most tracks produced on the label do not exceed 126 bpm thus branding the label as a true deep house label. It is Paradax's belief that a Deep House track is usually within the range of 119-126 bpm's.

DJ Dax & Dwayne Taylor started the label in 1999. In 2003 they launched their official production name “Soulato” pronounced so-la-toe, which is “just a cool way of combining the words Soul and Latin.”

While both DJ Dax & Dwayne started out as DJ's, their respective paths took a slightly different direction. DJ Dax still continues to spin music and produce, but has added acting to his resume. Dwayne's primary focus is on A&R (Artists & Repertoire) and artist management. Still, they both oversee the entire production of each release. They currently have fourteen vinyl and eight CD releases.

Having established an unparalleled presence as DJ's, remixers and producers, Soulato continue to use their combined talent to bring the dance community “a good solid blend of beats, instruments and most importantly, artists”.

== Artists ==
- Aaron Arce
- Anita Sherman
- Art Guiterrez
- Bernard Harris
- Brady Stone
- Chellena Black
- David Montoya & Juan Flores Jr. aka Estranjeros
- Dax (Daniel) Delgado
- DJ Rico
- Dusean
- Eddie Amador
- Evelyn Harris
- Frankie Ho
- Frankie Medina
- Gabriel Horizon
- Jerry Flores
- Jesse "Outlaw" Hinjosa
- Jessica Williams
- Jose Jimenez aka J-Vibe
- Joseph Junior
- Ken Myles
- Lars Behrenroth
- MAQman
- Marietta Archille
- Marta Santamaria
- Martin Villaneuve
- Miguel Plasencia
- Moses Eleyjian Sevan Shahgaldian aka roqsta
- Paul Zazadze
- Pino Arduini
- Rene Amaro
- Rob "House Music"
- Ryan "The rula"
- Teddy "Q" Zamora
- Tony Largo
- Victor Flores
- Victor Simonelli
- Wayne Howard
- Willy Sanjuan
- Womina Wells

== Vinyl-Releases ==
Catalogue No.	Artist	Title
PR01	Dj Dax & Dwayne Taylor	"Mish-Mosh e.p." "Soul Soul" "Remember Disco"
PR02	DJ Dax & Dwayne Taylor	"Together" "Midnite Fix"
PR03	DJ Dax & Dwayne Taylor feat. Marietta Archille, Moses E, Brady Stone, Stik Up Cru Productions	"The Right Way" "House The Power" "Hydra"
PR04	DJ Dax & Dwayne Taylor w\ Def Sol, Martin Villaneuve, Willy Sanjuan	"Up All Night w\Paradax Records" "I Don't Need You No More" "Destiny" "Groove Is In the Air"
PR05	Teddy "Q", Dax Delgado & Gabriel Horizon feat. Rene Amaro	"Gotta Feel It" "La Musica"
PR06	DDT, Frankie Medina & J Vibe, Brady Stone, Moso, Science	"DDT presents Gotta Feel It-The Remixes"
PR07	Miguel Plasencia, Dwayne & Moses	"Work It" "Live Together" "Learn to Love"
PR08	DJ Pino Arduini, Willy Sanjuan & F de Funk, Soulato Mix, Artie G	"Que Quieres De Mi" feat. Marta Santamaria
PR09	Soulato feat. Wayne Howard, Paul Zazadze	"12:01 A.M. Project" "Ain't No Doubt" "Look Around"
PR10	Aaron Arce, Miguel Plasencia & Frankie Ho	"12:02 A.M. Project" "Sweet Freedom" Generation & Soulsation
PR11	Jesse "Outlaw" & Jerry Flores feat. Dusean	"12:03 A.M. Project" "Set Yourself Free" "I want It" "Conversation" "Do You Really Feel It"
PR12	Soulato feat. Bernard Harris & Jesse "Outlaw"	"It's A Moody Thing"
PR13	Soulato, Frankie Medina, Lars Behrenroth	"Faith, Friendship & Love"
PRV 24	Rene Amesz	”Big & Rewind”
PRV 25	Mario Ferrini & Michelle Weeks, Aaron Arce, Gabriel Horizon and Tony Powell & B.Smiley	”You Are”
PRV 26	Aaron Arce, Soulato & Jesse “outlaw”	"You Can Count on Me feat. Alma Faye Brooks"

== CD Releases ==
- PR14 - I Don't Need You No More (2006)
- PR15 - WMC 07 Paradax Sampler (2007)
- PR16 - Paradax Summer Sampler (2007)
- PR17 - Mingle With The Night (2008)
- PR18 - Sweet Freedom “The 2009 Remixes” (2009)
- PR19 - Love Don't Hit (2009)
- PR20 - CHAINS (2010)
- PR21 - Funky Pressure feat Eszti (2014)
- PR22 - Housemusic Story feat. Dusean (2014)
- PR23 - Come on stand up-feat Claudja Barry (2016)
