= Big Meat Eater =

- Directed by: Chris Windsor
- Written by: Chris Windsor; Laurence Keane; Phil Savath
- Produced by: Laurence Keane
- Starring: George Dawson; Clarence Miller; Andrew Gillies
- Cinematography: Doug McKay
- Edited by: Laurence Keane; Lilla Pedersen; Chris Windsor
- Music by: J. Douglas Dodd
- Production company: BCD Entertainment
- Distributed by: Citadel Films
- Release date: 1982
- Running time: 82 minutes
- Country: Canada
- Language: English

Big Meat Eater is a 1982 Canadian comedy science fiction film.

Directed by Chris Windsor, the film centres on Bob (George Dawson), a butcher shop owner in Burquitlam, British Columbia. His new employee Abdullah (Clarence Miller) has murdered the mayor and stashed the body in Bob's freezer; meanwhile, unbeknownst to him, his shop is also a trove of "balonium", a rare radioactive fuel desired by a pair of space aliens who reanimate the mayor's body to help them harvest it.

Jay Scott of The Globe and Mail favourably reviewed the film, calling it an admirable entry in the emerging genre of intentionally bad cult films, and a better bad film than the contemporaneous Eating Raoul. Nathaniel Thompson of Turner Classic Movies later wrote that the film "cannily foreshadows the affectionate ribbing and emulation of classic '50s monster movies found in the likes of The Lost Skeleton of Cadavra and Ed Wood."

At the 4th Genie Awards in 1983, Windsor and cowriters Laurence Keane and Phil Savath were nominated for Best Original Screenplay.

The filmmakers planned a potential sequel to be titled Teenage Mounties from Outer Space, but the film was never made. Windsor never had another film credit, while Keane and Savath went on to write and direct the vastly more conventional historical drama film Samuel Lount in 1986.
