= Keven Jordan =

Keven Jordan is a former Canadian pop-rock singer and songwriter, most noted for winning the Juno Award for Most Promising Male Vocalist at the Juno Awards of 1992.

Born in Egypt, Jordan moved with his family to Stratford, Ontario in childhood. He worked for the Stratford Festival as a teenager before moving to Toronto, where he performed locally before signing to Sony Records in 1990. His debut album No Sign of Rain was released in 1991, and had some success on Canadian radio with the singles "Just Another Day", "No Sign of Rain" and "True Believers".

Following his Juno Award win, Jordan began working on his second album. Although the album was released in 1993, he found the creative process difficult and discouraging, and dropped out of the music business after it sold more poorly than expected. One of his last known public performances as a singer was performing "O Canada" at a Canadian Football League game between the Toronto Argonauts and the Ottawa Rough Riders in September 1994. He instead began to concentrate on graphic design work and photography, although he has continued to write songs for other artists and advertising jingles for television and radio commercials.

== Discography ==
- No Sign of Rain (1991)
- Keven Jordan (1993)
