= Roxanne Goldade =

Canadian pediatrician and country singer

Roxanne Goldade (born November 5, 1962, in Prelate, Saskatchewan) is a Canadian pediatrician and former country singer, most noted as a two-time Juno Award nominee for Most Promising Female Vocalist.

After appearing on local talent shows in the Calgary area, Goldade released her debut album 20 More Miles to Go on Westmount Records in 1975. Three singles were released from the album, "Listen to the Rain", "Mama Take My Hand" and a cover of Dickey Lee's "Give Me One Good Reason". "Listen to the Rain" was a Top 40 single in RPM's country charts in 1976, and "Give Me One Good Reason" was a Top 40 single in the magazine's country charts in 1978. She received her Juno Award nominations for Most Promising Female Vocalist at the Juno Awards of 1978 and the Juno Awards of 1979.

Goldade did not continue in the music business, but went to medical school and became a practicing pediatrician.
