= Young Saints =

- Origin: Newfoundland, Canada
- Genres: hard rock
- Label: Polygram Records
- Past members: Robin Cook; Darren 'Dirt' Churchill; Ian Roe; Alex MacFarlane; Rob Power

Young Saints were a Canadian hard rock band of the early 1990s. Although they recorded only one album before breaking up, they are most noted for garnering a Juno Award nomination for Most Promising Group at the Juno Awards of 1992 and for being only the second band from Newfoundland — and the first in a mainstream popular music genre, as their only predecessor was the traditional Newfoundland folk music band Figgy Duff — ever to sign a deal with a major record label.

Originally known as Crisis, the band consisted of vocalist and guitarist Robin Cook, guitarist Ian Roe, bassist Darren 'Dirt' Churchill and drummer Alex MacFarlane. After regularly touring the province but struggling to break out, they moved to Vancouver, British Columbia in 1989, where they landed a new manager and scored an early break as an opening act for Sue Medley.

After Medley talked the band up to her record label, they signed to Polygram Records in 1990. In January 1991, they entered the studio to begin recording their debut album on the same day the United States entered the Gulf War; the situation inspired the song "My God Is Bigger Than Your God", which was written during the recording sessions.

Their self-titled album was released on Polygram in 1991, and included the singles "Weight of the World", "Live for Today" and "New Solution". "Weight of the World" linked here at the #30 position, eventually peaked at #6 in the RPM100 singles chart, and "Live for Today", which included a guest performance by Randy Bachman, peaked at #58. The album peaked at #60 in the RPM album charts.

At the Juno Awards in 1992, the band garnered a nomination for Most Promising Group, and designer Robert Leboeuf was nominated for Best Album Design for the album's artwork. Despite their Juno nominations and chart success, however, the band broke up before recording another album. Cook and MacFarlane formed the new band Soul Candy, which pursued a more alternative rock direction than Young Saints, but did not attain significant success outside of the local Vancouver market.
