= Kerri Anderson =

Canadian pop and rock singer

- Genres: rock, pop
- Occupation: Singer
- Instrument: Vocals
- Years active: 1990s
- Labels: Impact Records

Kerri Anderson is a Canadian pop and rock singer, most prominent in the early 1990s. She is most noted for garnering a Juno Award nomination for Most Promising Female Vocalist at the Juno Awards of 1992.

Born and raised in Edmonton, Alberta, Anderson played piano in her youth and played briefly with a local band called Wages of Sin before recording a number of demo songs. The songs garnered her airplay on 96 K-Lite in the city, and the station recorded one of her subsequent live shows for broadcast; the recording in turn led to her becoming the first artist signed to Randy Nicklaus' Impact Records.

Impact released Anderson's album Labyrinth in 1991. However, by 1992 Impact Records was being taken over by MCA Records, and Labyrinth got lost in the shuffle. Left without a record label, Anderson battled clinical depression for several months before reemerging as a performer on Edmonton's local music scene again.

== Discography ==
- Labyrinth (1991)
