= Big House (Canadian band) =

Canadian rock band

- Origin: Edmonton, Alberta, Canada
- Genres: Rock music, Pop
- Years active: 1982-1992
- Labels: Boom Town Music, BMG Records
- Members: Jan Ek; K. B. Broc; Craig Beakhouse; Sjor Throndson; Jay Scott King

Big House was a Canadian punk-influenced rock band, based in Edmonton, Alberta, and active in the early 1990s.

== History ==
The band began in 1982, when singer and guitarist Jan Ek and drummer Sjor Throndson moved to Edmonton from their hometown of Portage la Prairie, Manitoba, where they had grown up together. Both had been steeped in classic rock, but were now hooked on Punk rock. In Edmonton, they joined the punk band Down Syndrome, which had been founded by Tim Balash, Laurie Bulback and Bob Kropotkin. Down Syndrome released one self-titled 7" E.P., in 1984. In 1986, Balash, Bulback and Kropotkin left the band; Ek and Throndson found replacements in guitarist Kevin 'K. B.' Broc and bassist Craig Beakhouse. They became Big House in 1987. They were renting a large old house at the time, which is how they chose the new band's name.

By this time, the band's music had evolved into a more commercial hard rock sound. In 1990, they were signed to Boom Town Music and produced an EP called "Pretty Things".

In 1991, they released the album Big House. Throndson recalled that Boom Town thought that it could market the band as a Canadian version of Guns N' Roses, and the label did invest in the band. The album was recorded at Prince's Paisley Park Studios, it was produced by the prominent David Bendeth and its cover was designed by Hugh Syme, who did all of the covers for Rush.

Three singles were released from the album: "Dollar In My Pocket (Pretty Things)", "All Nite" and "Baby Doll". "Dollar in My Pocket (Pretty Things)", topped the RPM Canadian Content chart in August 1991, and appeared on RPM's Top Singles chart that month. The song's video was a regular feature on MuchMusic, as were the videos for “Baby Doll” and “All Nite”. In his book Metal on Ice: Tales from Canada's Hard Rock and Heavy Metal Heroes musician Sean Kelly wrote that he considers "Dollar In My Pocket (Pretty Things)" to be "the best Canadian hard rock song of all time."

Just after the album's release, Beakhouse left the band and was replaced by Jay Scott King. The band went on tour with Slik Toxik and Sven Gali, and then broke up.

At the Juno Awards of 1992, Big House received three nominations: recording engineer Randy Staub was nominated as Best Recording Engineer for "Dollar In My Pocket (Pretty Things)", Syme was nominated for Best Album Design and the album itself was nominated as Hard Rock Album of the Year.

In 1992, Boom Town released a second EP called All Nite, which was a re-release of three of the band's top songs. The band's only other release was Live in Concert, a live album recorded at a performance in Toronto, which was distributed exclusively as a bonus gift to subscribers of Metal Forces magazine.

Of all of the musicians involved in Big House, the only one to stay in the music world was Jan Ek, who returned to Manitoba, where he performs and records as a solo artist and is an activist in the LGBTQ community.

== Discography ==
Albums

- Big House (1991), Boom Town Music
- Live In Concert (1992), Boom Town Music

EPs

- Pretty Things Limited Edition EP (1990), Boom Town Music
- All Nite (1992), Boom Town Music

Singles

- "Baby Doll" (1991)
- "Dollar In My Pocket (Pretty Things)" (1991)
- "All Nite" (1991)
