= Meanwhile Back in Paris... =

1978 rock album by Streetheart

Studio album by Streetheart
- Released: 1978
- Recorded: 1978
- Studio: Phase One Studios
- Genre: Rock; hard rock
- Length: 37:31
- Label: Atlantic
- Producer: George Semkiw; Streetheart

Streetheart chronology
The Twelve Incher - EP (1978)	Meanwhile Back in Paris... (1978)	Under Heaven Over Hell (1979)

Singles from Meanwhile Back in Paris...
- 1. "Look at Me" Released: 1978; 2. "Action" Released: 1978

Professional ratings
Review scores
Source	Rating
AllMusic	3/5 stars

Meanwhile Back in Paris... is the debut studio album by Canadian rock band Streetheart. It was released in 1978 and features the band's first two singles, "Action" and "Look at Me". The title comes from the lyrics of the album's opening track "Action". The album was followed by 1979's Under Heaven Over Hell.

In 1995, Repertoire Records re-released the album on CD. It only held the songs from the original LP, and all physical media issues of the album have since remained out of print. However, the album is still available via online MP3 download on major sites such as Amazon and iTunes.

In February 1981, Meanwhile Back in Paris... was certified platinum in Canada (in excess of 100,000 copies sold).

== Track listing ==
=== Side one ===
1. "Action" 4:48
2. "Pressure" 3:54
3. "Can You Feel It" 3:31
4. "Move On Over" 5:18

=== Side two ===
1. "Look at Me" 3:46
2. "Captain Rhythm" 4:21
3. "Streetwalker" 3:55
4. "People (Takin' Pieces of Me)" 3:40
5. "Just for You" 4:18

== Personnel ==
Credits are adapted from the Meanwhile Back in Paris... liner notes.

Streetheart

- Kenny Shields – lead vocals
- Paul Dean – guitar; backing vocals
- Matthew Frenette – drums; percussion
- Ken Sinnaeve – bass guitar; backing vocals
- Darryl Gutheil – keyboards; backing vocals

Production and artwork

- George Semkiw – producer; engineer
- Streetheart – producer
- Jeff Stobbs – assistant engineer
- Mark Wright – assistant engineer
- Mick Walsh – assistant engineer
- Gary Muth – executive producer
- Myron Zabol – photography
