= Roxolana Roslak =

Ukrainian-Canadian soprano singer (born 1940)

- Роксолана Росляк
- Born: 10 February 1940 (age 86); Chortkov, Ukrainian SSR, Soviet Union (now Chortkiv, Ternopil Oblast, Ukraine)
- Education: Royal Conservatory, University of Toronto
- Occupation: Soprano singer

Roxolana Mykhailivna Roslak (Ukrainian: Роксола́на Миха́йлівна Росляк, romanized: Roksolana Mykhailivna Rosliak; born 10 February 1940) is a Ukrainian-Canadian soprano singer.

== Biography ==
Roxolana Roslak was born on 10 February 1940 in Chortkov, Ukrainian SSR, Soviet Union (now Chortkiv, Ternopil Oblast, Ukraine).

From 1948, she lived in Edmonton, Canada and became a naturalized Canadian citizen in 1953. In 1964, Roslak graduated from the Royal Conservatory and the Faculty of Music at the University of Toronto.

== Career ==
From 1963, Roslak was a soloist with the Canadian Opera Company and the Toronto Regional Concert Bureau. She was a lecturer at the RCMT in Toronto, beginning in 1986.

She performed at opera houses in Germany (Munich, Düsseldorf), Great Britain (Royal Opera House, London; Shakespeare festival, Stratford-upon-Avon), and Switzerland (Geneva).

Roslak gave concerts in Canada and the United States, with a major 1978 tour of the American continent including the Lincoln Center and New York City; her repertoire included (among others) works by Antonio Vivaldi, Claude Debussy, and Ukrainian folk songs. She recorded several albums in the US.

Opera roles:

- 1963: Modiste, Der Rosenkavalier
- 1963, 1975: Marguerite, Somers' Louis Riel
- 1968: Musetta, La Bohème
- 1970: Donna Elvira, Don Giovanni
- 1970, 1979: Micaëla, Carmen
- 1978: Agnes Sorel, Jeanne d'Arc
- 1979: la comtesse, Les Noces de Figaro
- 1982: Alice Ford, Falstaff

== Awards ==
Year	Subject	Category	Awards	Result	Ref
1979	Hindemith: Das Marienleben (with Glenn Gould)	Best Classical Album of the Year	Juno Award	Won	
