= Juno Awards of 1992 =

Canadian music awards ceremony

- Date: 29 March 1992
- Venue: O'Keefe Centre, Toronto, Ontario
- Hosted by: Rick Moranis

Television/radio coverage
- Network: CBC

The Juno Awards (representing Canadian music industry achievements of the previous year ) from 1992, were awarded on 29 March in Toronto at a ceremony in the O'Keefe Centre. Rick Moranis was the host for the ceremonies, which were broadcast on CBC Television from 9 pm Eastern. The ceremony was watched by 1.3 million viewers.

Nominations were announced on 12 February 1992. Bryan Adams was nominated in 7 categories setting a Juno record, while Tom Cochrane received nominations in 6.

Adams sparked controversy in the Canadian music industry several months earlier when he openly criticised Canadian content regulations when his album project, Waking Up the Neighbours, was disqualified as Canadian for radio airplay purposes. That album was created largely with the help of non-Canadian producer Robert John "Mutt" Lange, therefore the songs fell below the legal Canadian content threshold. However, Adams qualified for the 1992 Juno nominations as an individual Canadian citizen. The 1992 Juno Awards thus became viewed as a showdown between Adams and Tom Cochrane, as the latter met Canadian content requirements.

When all the 1992 Juno Awards were presented, Tom Cochrane was the major winner with 4 Junos, compared to 3 for Adams. 1992's awards also featured an unprecedented three-way tie for winners in the Best Jazz Album category.

== Nominees and winners ==
=== Canadian Entertainer of the Year ===
Determined by public ballot.

Winner: Bryan Adams

Other Nominees:

- Blue Rodeo
- Celine Dion
- Colin James
- The Tragically Hip

=== Best Female Vocalist ===
Winner: Celine Dion

Other Nominees:

- Lee Aaron
- Loreena McKennitt
- Sarah McLachlan
- Mitsou

=== Best Male Vocalist ===
Winner: Tom Cochrane

Other Nominees:

- Bryan Adams
- Bruce Cockburn
- Maestro Fresh-Wes
- Robbie Robertson

=== Most Promising Female Vocalist ===
Winner: Alanis

Other Nominees:

- Kerri Anderson
- Meryn Cadell
- Darby Mills
- Chrissy Steele

Note: Julie Masse was originally nominated here but was disqualified prior to the awards because her album was deemed to have been released 21 August 1990. Juno rules had set 1 September 1990 as the earliest date for which an album could qualify for the 1992 awards. Masse's nomination for this category was replaced by Meryn Cadell.

=== Most Promising Male Vocalist ===
Winner: Keven Jordan

Other Nominees:

- Stephen Fearing
- Lennie Gallant
- Glen Stace
- Wild T

=== Group of the Year ===
Winner: Crash Test Dummies

Other Nominees:

- Blue Rodeo
- Glass Tiger
- Rush
- The Tragically Hip

=== Most Promising Group ===
Winner: Infidels

Other Nominees:

- The Rankin Family
- West End Girls
- World on Edge
- Young Saints

=== Songwriter of the Year ===
Winner: Tom Cochrane

Other Nominees:

- Bryan Adams
- Bruce Cockburn
- Shirley Eikhard
- Marc Jordan

=== Best Country Female Vocalist ===
Winner: Cassandra Vasik

Other Nominees:

- Carroll Baker
- Cindi Cain
- Joan Kennedy
- Anne Murray

=== Best Country Male Vocalist ===
Winner: George Fox

Other Nominees:

- Gary Fjellgaard
- Lennie Gallant
- Mark Koenig
- Ian Tyson

=== Best Country Group or Duo ===
Winner: Prairie Oyster

Other Nominees:

- Grievous Angels
- Joel Feeney and Western Front
- The Rankin Family
- Straight Clean & Simple

=== International Achievement Award ===
- Bryan Adams

=== Best Instrumental Artist ===
Winner: Shadowy Men on a Shadowy Planet

Other Nominees:

- John Arpin
- Jacques de Koninck
- David Foster
- Graham Townsend

=== Foreign Entertainer of the Year ===
Winner: Garth Brooks

Other Nominees:

- Michael Bolton
- Phil Collins
- MC Hammer
- Rod Stewart

=== Best Producer ===
Winner: Bryan Adams (with Robert John "Mutt" Lange), "(Everything I Do) I Do It for You" and "Can't Stop This Thing We Started"

Other Nominees:

- Tom Cochrane, Mad Mad World
- Geddy Lee, Alex Lifeson, Neil Peart with Rupert Hine, Roll the Bones
- Loreena McKennitt with Brian Hughes, The Visit
- Bob Rock with James Hetfield, Lars Ulrich, "Enter Sandman" by Metallica and Primal Scream by Mötley Crüe

=== Best Recording Engineer ===
Winner: Mike Fraser, "Thunderstruck" and "Money Talks" by AC/DC

Other Nominees:

- Scott Boyling, Paul Milner, John Naslen, "No Sign of Rain" and "Path to You" by Keven Jordan
- Kevin Doyle, "Slowly Slipping Away" by Harem Scarem
- Greg Reely, "D for Democracy" and "Political" for Spirit of the West
- Randy Staub, "Enter Sandman" by Metallica, "Dollar In My Pocket (Pretty Things)" for Big House

=== Canadian Music Hall of Fame ===
Winner: Ian and Sylvia Tyson

=== Walt Grealis Special Achievement Award ===
Winner: (posthumous) Harold Moon

== Nominated and winning albums ==
=== Best Album ===
Winner: Mad Mad World, Tom Cochrane

Other Nominees:

- The Ghosts That Haunt Me, Crash Test Dummies
- Highlights From The Phantom of the Opera, cast members of the Canadian production of this musical
- Road Apples, The Tragically Hip
- Waking Up the Neighbours, Bryan Adams

=== Best Children's Album ===
Winner: Vivaldi's Ring of Mystery, Classical Kids, producer Susan Hammond

Other Nominees:

- Children of the Morning, Jack Grunsky
- Happy Feet, Fred Penner
- Rendezvous Soleil, Claire de Lune
- Swing on a Star, Claire de Lune

=== Best Classical Album (Solo or Chamber Ensemble) ===
Winner: Liszt: Années De Pelerinage, Louis Lortie piano

Other Nominees:

- Ravel: Music for Four Hands, Louis Lortie and Helene Mercier
- Maurice Ravel: Piano Works Vol. 1, André Laplante
- Alessandro Scarlatti: Cantatas, Nancy Argenta
- Smetana: Complete Czech Dances, Antonin Kubelek

=== Best Classical Album (Large Ensemble) ===
Winner: Debussy: Pelleas et Melisande, Montreal Symphony Orchestra, conductor Charles Dutoit

Other Nominees:

- Bloch: Schelomo and Bruch Koi Nidrel, Ofra Harnoy
- Mozart: German Dances, Tafelmusik
- Mozart: Overtures, Tafelmusik
- Mozart: Six Symphonies After Serenades, Tafelmusik

=== Best Album Design ===
Winner: Hugh Syme, Roll The Bones by Rush

Other Nominees:

- Robert Leboeuf, Art Bergmann by Art Bergmann
- Robert Leboeuf, Young Saints by Young Saints
- Kevin Mutch, The Ghosts That Haunt Me by Crash Test Dummies
- Hugh Syme, Big House by Big House

=== Best Selling Album by a Foreign Artist ===
Winner: To The Extreme, Vanilla Ice

Other Nominees:

- Gonna Make You Sweat, C&C Music Factory
- Metallica, Metallica
- Time, Love and Tenderness, Michael Bolton
- The Razor's Edge, AC/DC

=== Best Jazz Album ===
Winners (3-way tie):

- For The Moment, Renee Rosnes
- In Transition, Brian Dickinson
- The Brass Is Back, Rob McConnell and the Boss Brass

Other Nominees:

- Climbing, Barry Elmes
- Gliding, Stan Samole

=== Best Selling Francophone Album ===
Winner: Sauvez mon âme, Luc de Larochellière

Other Nominees:

- L'Album du peuple, François Pérusse
- Kathleen, Kathleen Sergerie
- Snob, Les B.B.
- Vilain Pingouin, Vilain Pingouin

Note: Julie Masse was originally nominated here but was disqualified prior to the awards because her album was deemed to have been released 21 August 1990. Juno rules had set 1 September 1990 as the earliest date for which an album could qualify for the 1992 awards. Masse's nomination for this category was replaced by Kathleen.

=== Hard Rock Album of the Year ===
Winner: Roll the Bones, Rush

Other Nominees:

- Big House, Big House
- Love Machine, Brighton Rock
- Magnet to Steele, Chrissy Steele
- Some Girls Do, Lee Aaron

=== Best Roots & Traditional Album ===
Winners (tie):

- Various Artists, Saturday Night Blues
- Loreena McKennitt, The Visit

Other Nominees:

- Bruce Cockburn, Nothing But a Burning Light
- Kashtin, Innu
- The Rankin Family, Fare Thee Well Love

== Nominated and winning releases ==
=== Single of the Year ===
Winner: "Life Is a Highway", Tom Cochrane

Other Nominees:

- "Animal Heart", Glass Tiger
- "Can't Stop This Thing We Started", Bryan Adams
- "(Everything I Do) I Do It For You", Bryan Adams
- "Too Hot", Alanis

=== Best Classical Composition ===
Winner: Concerto For Piano & Chamber Orchestra, Michael Conway Baker

Other Nominees:

- Dream Rainbow Dream Thunder, R. Murray Schafer
- Improvisation on a Blue Theme, John Thrower
- Memorial to Martin Luther King, Oskar Morawetz
- Virelai, Patrick Cardy

=== Best Selling Single by a Foreign Artist ===
Winner: "More Than Words", Extreme

Other Nominees:

- "Black or White", Michael Jackson
- "Enter Sandman", Metallica
- "Joyride", Roxette
- "Unbelievable", EMF

=== Best R&B/Soul Recording ===
Winner: Call My Name, Love & Sas

Other Nominees:

- All Talk, Lorraine Scott
- Destiny, Simply Majestic
- Got 2 Have Your Love, Helen Sharpe
- Let Me Go, Debbie Johnson

=== Rap Recording of the Year ===
Winner: My Definition of a Boombastic Jazz Style, Dream Warriors

Other Nominees:

- Conductin' Things, Maestro Fresh-Wes
- Jamaican Funk: Canadian Style, Michie Mee and L.A. Luv
- Play the Music DJ, Simply Majestic
- She's a Flirt (Let's Do It), Kish

=== Best World Beat Recording ===
Winner: The Gathering, various artists

Other Nominees:

- Haï Musik, Anoosh
- Innu, Kashtin
- The Flying Bulgar Klezmer Band, Flying Bulgar Klezmer Band
- Till the Bars Break, Jeannette Armstrong

=== Best Dance Recording ===
Winner: "Everyone's a Winner" (Chocolate Movement mix), Bootsauce

Other Nominees:

- "Good Together" (Wicked mix), Candi & The Backbeat
- "I Don't Need Yo Kiss" (The 12 Inch mix), Love & Sas
- "I'll Respect You" (club mix), Debbie Johnson
- "Too Hot" (Hott Shot mix), Alanis

=== Best Video ===
Winner: Phil Kates, "Into The Fire" by Sarah McLachlan

Other Nominees:

- Lyne Charlebois, "Political" by Spirit of the West
- Alain DesRochers, "Dis Moi, Dis Moi" by Mitsou
- Dale Heslip, "Superman's Song" by Crash Test Dummies
- David Storey, "Life is a Highway" by Tom Cochrane
