= The Tommy Banks Show =

- Genre: Variety
- Written by: Colin MacLean
- Presented by: Tommy Banks
- Country of origin: Canada
- Original language: English
- No. of seasons: 3

Production
- Producer: Don McRae
- Production locations: Edmonton, Alberta, Canada
- Running time: 30-60 minutes

Original release
- Network: CBC Television
- Release: 29 December 1971 – 1974

The Tommy Banks Show is a Canadian variety and talk show television program that aired on CBC Television from 1971 to 1974.

== Premise ==
This Edmonton-produced program was recorded in the Student Union Theatre at the University of Alberta, featuring guests from Canada and other nations. On one episode, the visitors were musician Bruce Cockburn and nutritionist Adelle Davis. The program was broadcast locally in Edmonton until it was distributed nationally on CBC in 1971. Some guests have included leaders from the Church of Satan and the Canadian operations of the Ku Klux Klan.

== Scheduling ==
This program was broadcast over three seasons as follows:

Day	Time	Season run	Notes
Wednesdays	10:30 p.m.	29 December 1971 to 5 April 1972	30 minutes
Saturdays	10:00 p.m.	15 July to 9 September 1972	60 minutes
Fridays	10:30 p.m.	22 September 1972 to 18 May 1973	30 minutes
Wednesdays	10:30 p.m.	10 October 1973 to 9 January 1974	30 minutes
Thursday	9:00 p.m.	16 May 1974	30 minutes
Fridays	7:30-8:00 p.m.	21 Jun-2 Aug 1974	rebroadcast, 30 minutes
