= Glen Stace =

- Genres: rock, pop
- Occupations: Singer, songwriter
- Instrument: Vocals
- Years active: 1990s
- Label: Bumstead Records

Glen Stace is a Canadian pop and rock singer and songwriter, most prominent in the early 1990s. He is most noted for garnering a Juno Award nomination for Most Promising Male Vocalist at the Juno Awards of 1992.

Originally from Saskatoon, Saskatchewan, Stace began writing songs as a pastime while working in mining exploration in remote locations in northern Saskatchewan. In 1989, he won a local radio "Homegrown" competition with his song "Runaround", and competed in YTV's Rock Showdown series. Larry Wanagas then signed him to Bumstead Records, which released his debut album Buddha Hotel in 1991. The album's country rock style was commonly compared by critics to Neil Young, Steve Earle and John Fogerty. The album peaked at #73 in RPM, and "Runaround" peaked at No. 33 in the magazine's Top 40.

He followed up in 1992 with Road to Damascus. He subsequently lost his record deal, and reemerged in 2000 with the independently-released album Redemption Game.
