= John Bottomley =

Canadian singer and songwriter (1960–2011)

John Bottomley (September 17, 1960 – April 6, 2011) was a Canadian singer-songwriter.

He started in music in the early 1980s with the band Tulpa, which also included his brother Chris, and launched a solo career in 1990 with his solo debut album Library of the Sun. He followed up with his second album, Songs with the Ornamental Hermits, in 1992, and won the Juno Award for Most Promising Male Vocalist the following year.

His most successful album, 1995's Blackberry, spawned the Top 40 hits "You Lose and You Gain" and "Long Way to Go".

Bottomley died in 2011 in Brackendale, British Columbia. The coroner's report concluded that Bottomley killed himself and a family spokesperson confirmed that he had been suffering from clinical depression.

== Discography ==
=== Albums ===
Year	Album
1984	Mosaic Fish (with Tulpa)
1986	Live at CBGB's (with Tulpa)
1990	Library of the Sun
1992	Songs with the Ornamental Hermits
1995	Blackberry
1995	Triskelion
1998	Raggle Taggle
2000	The Crown of Life, Part I
2001	The Crown of Life, Part II
2001	Here's the Candy
2005	Star in the Singing Grove
2007	Songpoet
2010	The Healing Dream

=== Singles ===
Year	Single	Chart Positions		Album
Year	Single	CAN AC	CAN	Album
1991	"Barkeeper (Pour Me a Drink)"	—	—	Library of the Sun
1992	"Bell Tower Radio"	29	—	Songs with the Ornamental Hermits
1995	"You Lose and You Gain"	1	6	Blackberry
1995	"Long Way to Go"	15	29	Blackberry
1998	"Take You Higher"	53	—	Raggle Taggle
