= Cindi Cain =

Canadian country music artist

- Born: Cindy Churko; Winnipeg, Manitoba, Canada
- Genre: Country
- Occupation: Singer
- Instrument: Vocals
- Years active: 1988–present
- Labels: Golden Eagle; Epic
- Website: Official website

Cindi Cain (born Cindy Churko in Winnipeg, Manitoba, Canada) is a Canadian country music artist.

== Early life ==
Cain grew up in the Elmwood neighbourhood of Winnipeg, where she first began performing at the age of 13. By the time she was 19, she was performing regularly in Winnipeg.

== Music career ==
Cain's 1989 single "I Think That I'll Be Needing You" reached the Top 10 of the RPM Country Tracks chart. She released one album, A Place Where Memories Live in 1990 and a greatest hits album in 2006. Cain charted seven Top 40 hits on the Canadian country charts during her career. Cain was nominated for Best Country Female Vocalist at the Juno Awards in 1992. In 2019, she was inducted into the Manitoba Country Music Hall of Fame.

== Personal ==
Cain currently spends her time volunteering at the St. Boniface Hospital in Winnipeg, singing for patients in the palliative care ward.

== Discography ==
=== Albums ===
Title	Album details
A Place Where Memories Live	Release date: 1990; Label: Epic Records
The Best of Cindi Cain	Release date: 2006; Label: Unidisc Music

=== Singles ===
Year	Title	Peak positions	Album
Year	Title	CAN Country	Album
1988	"You Were Listening to the Singer"	15	A Place Where Memories Live
1988	"The Music Still in Me"	15	Non-album songs
1989	"I Think That I'll Be Needing You"	10	Non-album songs
1989	"Just a Place Where Mem'ries Live"	17	A Place Where Memories Live
1990	"Once the Magic's Gone"	19	A Place Where Memories Live
1991	"Two More on the Dance Floor"	37	A Place Where Memories Live
1992	"(You Made a) Rock of Gibraltar"	13	Non-album song
