= Johnnie Lovesin =

Canadian musical artist (1949–2019)

- Born: May 22, 1949; Val-d'Or, Quebec
- Origin: Toronto, Ontario
- Died: February 23, 2019 (aged 69)
- Genre: rock
- Occupation: Musician
- Instruments: Guitar, vocals
- Years active: 1960s-2019

Johnnie Lovesin (May 22, 1949 – February 23, 2019) was a Canadian musician, most noted as a two-time Juno Award nominee for Most Promising Male Vocalist at the Juno Awards of 1984 and the Juno Awards of 1985.

Originally from Val-d'Or, Quebec, he was first active as a musician on the Yorkville scene in Toronto in the 1960s. His first band was Black Ballet in 1969. Over the next number of years he performed with the bands Johnnie Lovesin and the Invisible Band; Johnnie Lovesin and the Sidewalk Commandos; Johnnie Lovesin and The Next; Red Hot and Blue; and as a solo artist under the stage name Crazy John Lovesin, the Ace from Space. When the Invisible Band opened for The Ramones at a show in Toronto, one Toronto Sun music critic asserted in his review that Lovesin had blown the Ramones off the stage. He released several singles during his early career.

He released his debut album Set the Night on Fire in 1980, and followed up with Rough Side of Town in 1983. In addition to his Juno Award nominations for Most Promising Male Vocalist, he was nominated for a U-Know Award for Best Male Vocalist in 1985. He then signed to A&M Records, which rereleased Rough Side of Town and his follow-up album Tough Breaks. Soon after releasing Tough Breaks, however, Lovesin suffered a brain aneurysm shortly after performing at the city's annual New Year's Eve show at Nathan Phillips Square, and withdrew from the music business for a time to recover.

Upon his return to music, he became leader of the house band at Toronto's Matador Club, and released the new album Ready to Rumble independently in 1996. After moving to Jordan, Ontario, he still performed occasional shows in Toronto including birthday shows in 2010 and 2016.

Lovesin died unexpectedly three months shy of his 70th birthday, on the evening of February 23, 2019.

== Discography ==
- Set the Night on Fire (1980)
- Rough Side of Town (1983)
- Tough Breaks (1986)
- Ready to Rumble (1996)
