= Alma Faye Brooks =

American-born Canadian disco singer

Alma Faye Brooks is an American-born Canadian disco singer. She is most noted as a two-time Juno Award nominee for Best New Female Vocalist, receiving nods at the Juno Awards of 1978 and the Juno Awards of 1980.

Born in Tyler, Texas, she moved to Montreal, Quebec, at age 12 with her family. Living in the Little Burgundy neighbourhood, she sang at the Union United Church, and had a musical theatre role in a production of Hair.

In 1977 she released her debut single "Stop, I Don't Need No Sympathy", a cover of a song previously performed by Lynn Roman.

In 1979 she released the album Doin' It, which spawned the singles "It's Over" and "Don't Fall In Love". Her performances to support the album included an appearance on Whatever Turns You On, a short-lived prime-time version of the long-running sketch comedy/variety series You Can't Do That on Television. However, with the disco genre in commercial decline around this time, she did not release another album, and reemerged in the late 1980s in Montreal's local live music scene, performing Motown music by artists such as Aretha Franklin and The Supremes at "Soul Unlimited" events at the Rising Sun club.

She has continued to perform as a singer with La Gioventu, a dance music band in Montreal led by her husband, Louis Toteda. Following the death of disco icon Donna Summer in 2012, she began performing Donna Summer songs with La Gioventu in tribute.

Her song "Thank You", from Doin' It, was used in the soundtrack to the 2023 film Solo.
