= Burquitlam, British Columbia =

Burquitlam Burquitlam Centre
- Neighbourhood of Coquitlam
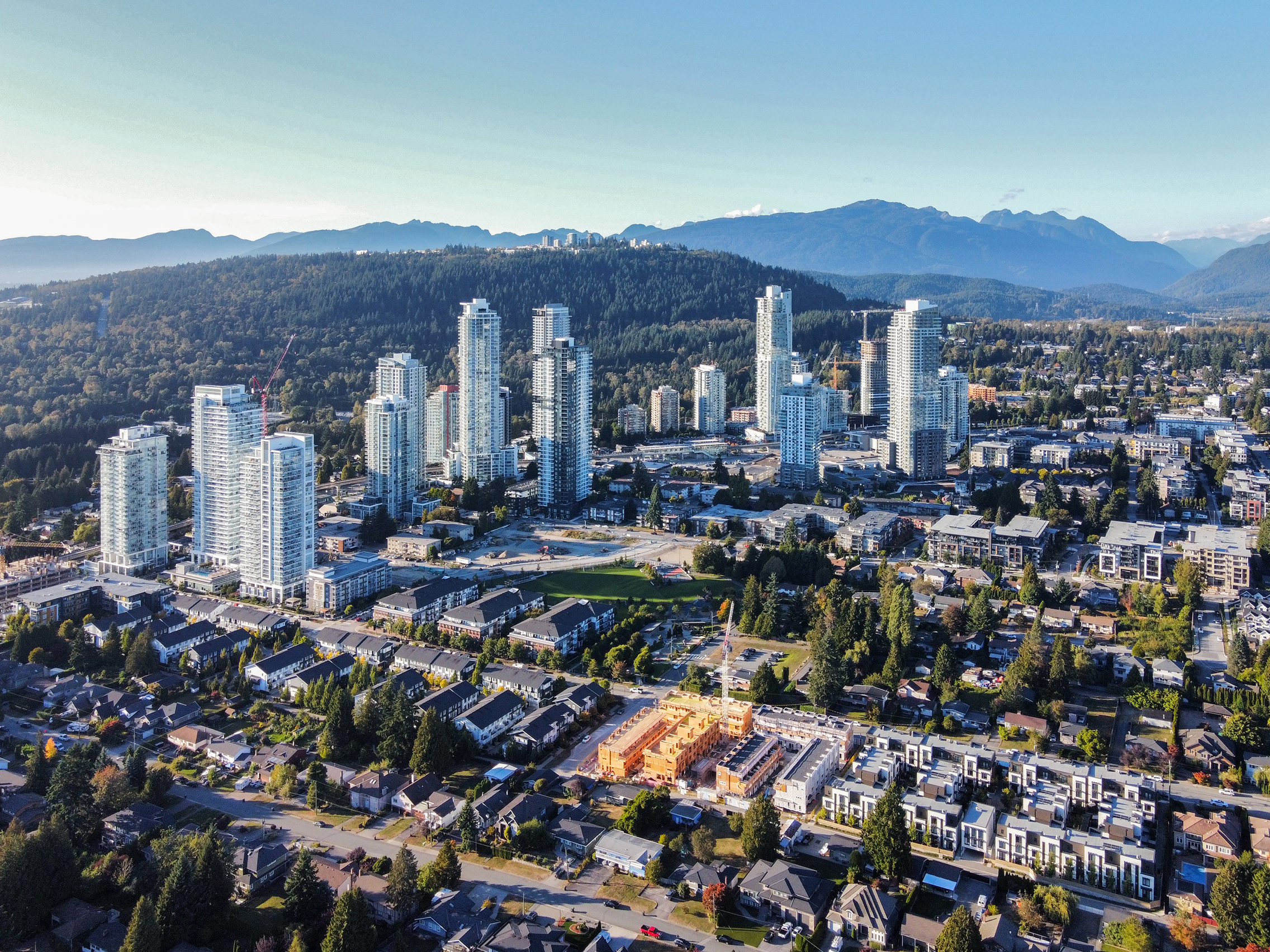
- Aerial view of Burquitlam in 2025

- Location of Burquitlam within Metro Vancouver
- Coordinates: 49°15′40″N 122°53′20″W
- Country: Canada
- Province: British Columbia
- Region: Lower Mainland
- Regional District: Metro Vancouver
- City: Coquitlam

Government
  - Mayor: Craig Hodge
  - MP (Fed.): Zoe Royer (LPC)
  - MLA (Prov.): John McEwen (BC Conservative)

Population (2021)
  - Total: 25,637
- Time zone: UTC−7 (PCT)

Burquitlam is a neighbourhood and commercial district of the City of Coquitlam, British Columbia, Canada.

== Etymology ==
Its name derives from a combination of the names of the cities (then district municipalities) of Burnaby and Coquitlam in order to name a post office for this area, which is just east of the boundary of the two cities and is not used by the City of Burnaby.

A fictionalized version of Burquitlam is seen in the 1982 film Big Meat Eater.

== Geography ==
The Planning Department of the City of Coquitlam describes the neighbourhood of Burquitlam–Lougheed as being north of the New Westminster boundary, east of North Road, west of Blue Mountain Street, and to the south of the boundary of the City of Port Moody. Burquitlam Plaza is a shopping plaza by the intersection of Clarke Road (a northeastern continuation of the North Road arterial) and Como Lake Ave.

== Demographics ==
Population history
Year	Pop.	±%
1986	16,217	—
1991	17,212	+6.1%
1996	18,516	+7.6%
2001	18,848	+1.8%
2006	19,216	+2.0%
2011	21,654	+12.7%
2016	22,775	+5.2%
2021	25,637	+12.6%
Source: Statistics Canada

=== Ethnicity ===
Panethnic groups in Burquitlam–Lougheed (1991−2021)
Panethnic group	2021 census		2016 census		2011 census		2006 census		2001 census		1996 census		1991 census	
Panethnic group	Pop.	%	Pop.	%	Pop.	%	Pop.	%	Pop.	%	Pop.	%	Pop.	%
European (Note: Statistic includes all persons that did not make up part of a visible minority or an indigenous identity.)	9,420	37.13%	9,920	44.16%	11,075	52.44%	11,590	60.89%	12,165	65.49%	13,285	72.95%	13,140	77.64%
East Asian (Note: Statistic includes total responses of "Chinese", "Korean", and "Japanese" under visible minority section on census.)	9,195	36.24%	6,895	30.69%	5,295	25.07%	4,175	21.93%	3,795	20.43%	2,665	14.63%	1,720	10.16%
Middle Eastern (Note: Statistic includes total responses of "West Asian" and "Arab" under visible minority section on census.)	1,605	6.33%	1,535	6.83%	1,015	4.81%	955	5.02%	835	4.5%	380	2.09%	205	1.21%
Southeast Asian (Note: Statistic includes total responses of "Filipino" and "Southeast Asian" under visible minority section on census.)	1,390	5.48%	1,375	6.12%	1,240	5.87%	580	3.05%	530	2.85%	445	2.44%	265	1.57%
South Asian	1,240	4.89%	1,185	5.27%	1,065	5.04%	795	4.18%	515	2.77%	610	3.35%	480	2.84%
African	725	2.86%	310	1.38%	175	0.83%	220	1.16%	150	0.81%	150	0.82%	200	1.18%
Latin American	590	2.33%	325	1.45%	410	1.94%	180	0.95%	230	1.24%	75	0.41%	90	0.53%
Indigenous	470	1.85%	540	2.4%	515	2.44%	320	1.68%	255	1.37%	465	2.55%	480	2.84%
Other/multiracial (Note: Statistic includes total responses of "Visible minority, n.i.e." and "Multiple visible minorities" under visible minority section on census.)	735	2.9%	380	1.69%	330	1.56%	220	1.16%	100	0.54%	135	0.74%	345	2.04%
Total responses	25,370	98.96%	22,465	98.64%	21,120	97.53%	19,035	99.06%	18,575	98.55%	18,210	98.35%	16,925	98.33%
Total population	25,637	100%	22,775	100%	21,654	100%	19,216	100%	18,848	100%	18,516	100%	17,212	100%
Note: Totals greater than 100% due to multiple origin responses

=== Language ===
Languages spoken in Burquitlam (2016) Source: ,		%
Language	English	48.6%
Language	Mandarin	8.8%
Language	Korean	8.4%
Language	Cantonese	5.9%
Language	Persian	4.0%
Language	Punjabi	2.5%
Language	Spanish	2.1%
Language	Russian	1.9%
Language	Tagalog	1.9%
Language	Arabic	1.6%
Language	Italian	1.4%
Language	Other	12.9%
Total %		100%

== Transportation ==
On December 2, 2016, the SkyTrain's Millennium Line Evergreen Extension opened. The area is served by Burquitlam station.

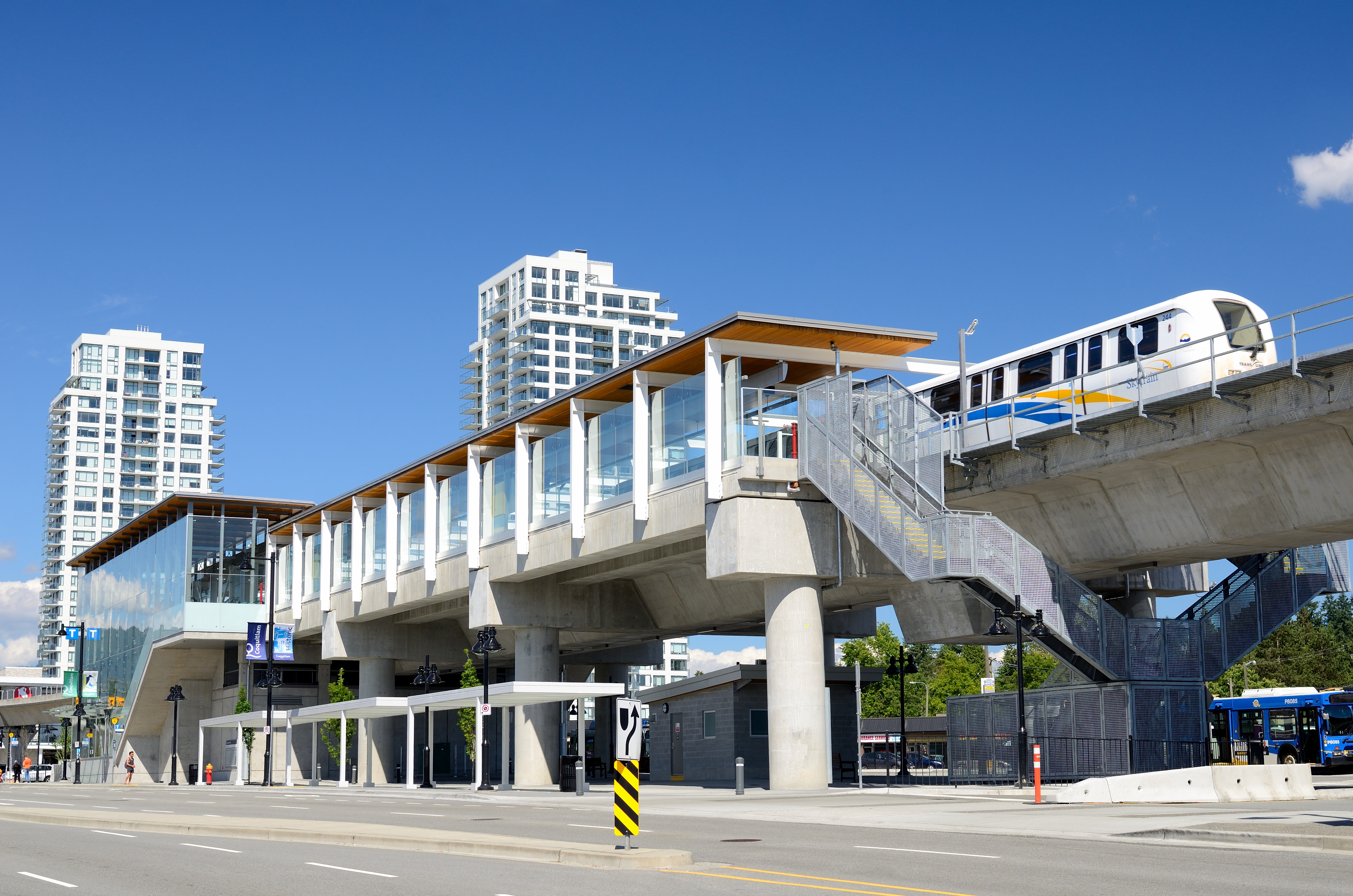
Burquitlam Station is situated in the heart of the Burquitlam Neighbourhood

== Climate ==
Like the rest of Metro Vancouver, Burquitlam features an oceanic climate. Snowfall is slightly higher than the City of Vancouver due to the inland location and relative high elevation of Burquitlam.

Climate data for Burquitlam (BURQUITLAM VANCOUVER GOLF COURSE) (Elevation: 122m) 1981−2010
Month	Jan	Feb	Mar	Apr	May	Jun	Jul	Aug	Sep	Oct	Nov	Dec	Year
Record high °C (°F)	14.5 (58.1)	17.5 (63.5)	24.5 (76.1)	28.0 (82.4)	32.0 (89.6)	37.0 (98.6)	37.0 (98.6)	35.0 (95.0)	31.5 (88.7)	26.5 (79.7)	17.0 (62.6)	14.5 (58.1)	37.0 (98.6)
Mean daily maximum °C (°F)	6.3 (43.3)	8.3 (46.9)	10.6 (51.1)	14.3 (57.7)	17.5 (63.5)	20.1 (68.2)	23.5 (74.3)	23.5 (74.3)	20.7 (69.3)	14.1 (57.4)	8.9 (48.0)	6.2 (43.2)	14.5 (58.1)
Daily mean °C (°F)	3.8 (38.8)	4.9 (40.8)	7.0 (44.6)	10.0 (50.0)	12.9 (55.2)	15.7 (60.3)	18.5 (65.3)	18.6 (65.5)	17.0 (62.6)	10.8 (51.4)	6.4 (43.5)	3.9 (39.0)	10.7 (51.3)
Mean daily minimum °C (°F)	1.4 (34.5)	1.6 (34.9)	3.4 (38.1)	5.7 (42.3)	8.3 (46.9)	11.2 (52.2)	13.4 (56.1)	13.5 (56.3)	11.3 (52.3)	7.4 (45.3)	3.8 (38.8)	1.6 (34.9)	6.9 (44.4)
Record low °C (°F)	−12.0 (10.4)	−13.5 (7.7)	−6.5 (20.3)	0.0 (32.0)	1.0 (33.8)	6.0 (42.8)	7.0 (44.6)	9.0 (48.2)	5.0 (41.0)	−4.0 (24.8)	−10.0 (14.0)	−15.5 (4.1)	−15.5 (4.1)
Average precipitation mm (inches)	286.0 (11.26)	149.7 (5.89)	176.3 (6.94)	137.0 (5.39)	117.1 (4.61)	94.7 (3.73)	61.7 (2.43)	72.4 (2.85)	78.3 (3.08)	206.9 (8.15)	306.7 (12.07)	250.3 (9.85)	1,937 (76.26)
Average rainfall mm (inches)	254.5 (10.02)	140.9 (5.55)	171.3 (6.74)	137.0 (5.39)	117.1 (4.61)	94.7 (3.73)	61.7 (2.43)	72.4 (2.85)	78.3 (3.08)	206.9 (8.15)	303.6 (11.95)	234.5 (9.23)	1,872.7 (73.73)
Average snowfall cm (inches)	31.6 (12.4)	8.8 (3.5)	5.1 (2.0)	0.0 (0.0)	0.0 (0.0)	0.0 (0.0)	0.0 (0.0)	0.0 (0.0)	0.0 (0.0)	0.1 (0.0)	3.2 (1.3)	15.8 (6.2)	64.4 (25.4)
Average precipitation days (≥ 0.2 mm)	19.8	14.2	19.1	15.2	13.9	12.7	7.7	6.8	7.7	16.9	21.1	19.4	174.3
Average rainy days (≥ 0.2 mm)	18.1	13.4	18.5	15.2	13.9	12.7	7.7	6.8	7.7	16.9	20.7	17.9	169.5
Average snowy days (≥ 0.2 cm)	3.5	1.7	1.1	0.0	0.0	0.0	0.0	0.0	0.0	0.06	1.1	2.7	10.16
Source: Environment Canada (normals, 1981−2010)
