= Martin Stevens (musician) =

Canadian singer (1953–2023)

- Born: Roger Prud'homme; October 3, 1953; Verdun, Quebec, Canada
- Died: July 5, 2023 (aged 69)
- Occupation: Pop singer

Roger Prud'homme (October 3, 1953 – July 5, 2023), better known by his stage name Martin Stevens, was a Canadian pop singer prominent in the disco era. He was most noted as a two-time Juno Award nominee for Best Selling Single, receiving nominations at the Juno Awards of 1979 for "Love Is in the Air" and at the Juno Awards of 1980 for "Midnight Music".

== Life and career ==
A francophone from Verdun, Quebec, he recorded a number of French-language singles in the 1970s, including "J’aime la musique (Comme un fou)" and "Sans ton amour". His self-titled debut album, released in 1978, consisted entirely of French material except for his cover of Vanda & Young's "Love Is in the Air". His version of the song debuted on the Canadian charts in July 1978, and had already reached #21 by September 9, the week the more internationally familiar version by John Paul Young debuted. The two versions appear to have cut into each other's chart performance; Stevens' version immediately stalled, peaking only at #19 a few weeks later before beginning to decline, while Young's peaked at #26 two weeks later.

Stevens' second album, Midnight Music, was released in 1979 and consisted entirely of English-language songs. The title track was a hit in Quebec, but did not perform strongly on the English Canadian charts, reaching number 50. Stevens was a Prix Félix finalist for Male Artist of the Year in 1979, but did not win.

Stevens published an autobiography, Sexe, drogue et disco, in 2007.

Martin Stevens died on July 5, 2023, at the age of 69.
