= Burquitlam station =

Metro Vancouver SkyTrain station

Burquitlam
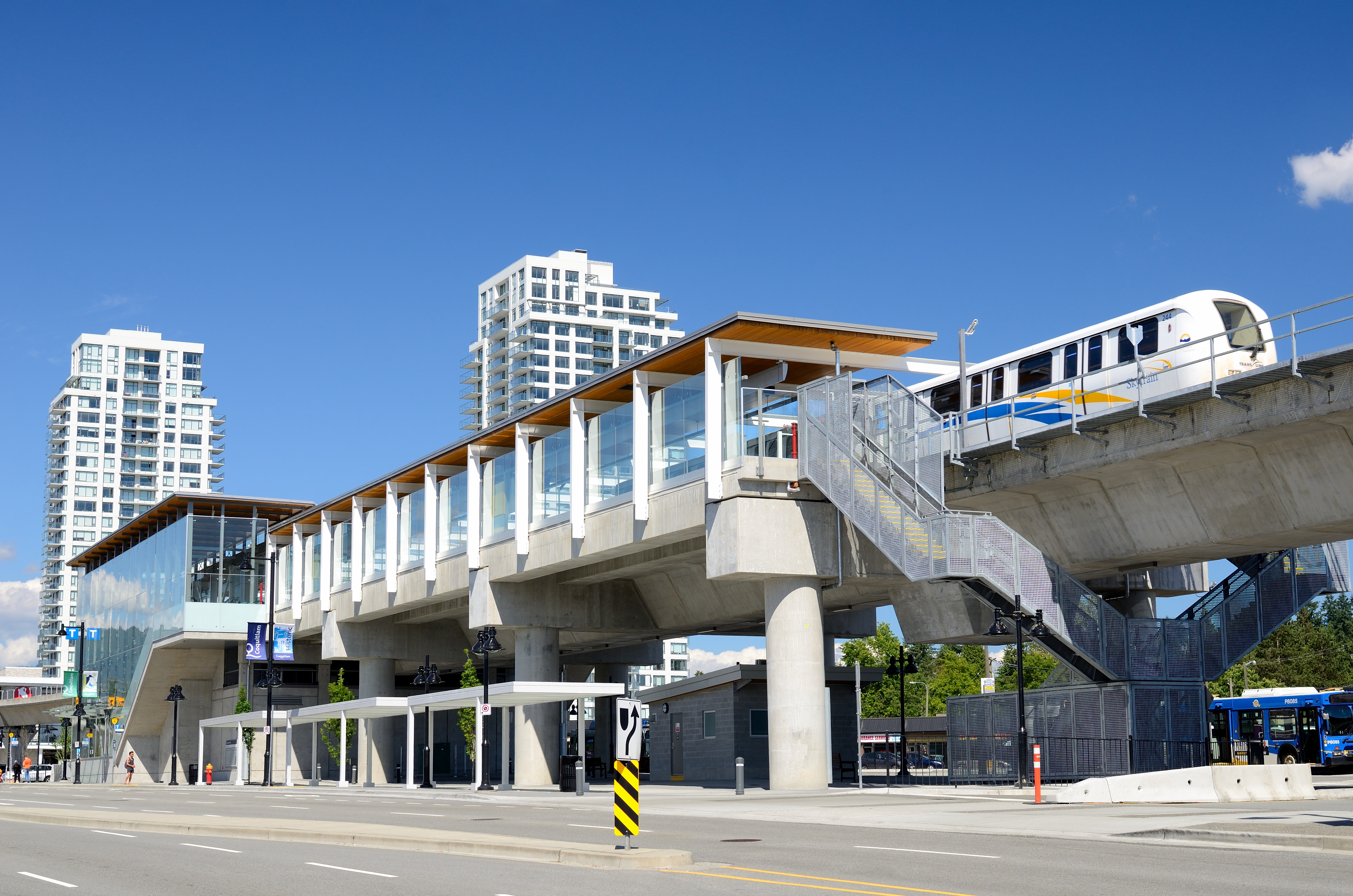

General information
- Location: 548 Clarke Road, Coquitlam
- Coordinates: 49°15′41″N 122°53′23″W
- System: SkyTrain station
- Owner: TransLink
- Platforms: Side platform
- Tracks: 2

Construction
- Structure type: Elevated
- Accessible: yes

Other information
- Fare zone: 3

History
- Opened: December 2, 2016

Passengers
- 2025: 1,622,000 ▲3.3%
- Rank: 31 of 54

Services
Preceding station	TransLink	Following station
Lougheed Town Centre towards VCC–Clark	Millennium Line	Moody Centre towards Lafarge Lake–Douglas
Location

Burquitlam station is a rapid transit station on the Millennium Line, part of Metro Vancouver's SkyTrain system, and is located in Coquitlam, British Columbia, Canada. It opened on December 2, 2016, with the rest of the Evergreen Extension and is named after the Burquitlam neighbourhood in which it is located.

The station features a transit exchange (including a direct connection to Simon Fraser University), HandyDart area, night bus service to and from Downtown Vancouver, and bike lockers and racks.

== Station information ==
=== Entrances ===
Burquitlam is served by a single entrance facing the north end of the station. The entrance is located on the east side of Clarke Road.

=== Transit connections ===
Burquitlam station provides an on- and off-street transit exchange on Clarke Road, between Como Lake and Smith avenues. The station is in Translink's Fare Zone 3 which means customers must pay additional fare if they cross zone boundaries using SeaBus or SkyTrain during peak hours (from start of transit service in the morning to 6:30 pm, excluding weekends and holidays). This additional amount is determined by the number of boundaries crossed. All bus and HandyDART travel is 1-zone.

Bay	Location	Route #	Notes
1	Bus loop	Unloading only	
2	Bus loop	157 Lougheed Station	Via Poirier Centre
3	Bus loop	151 Coquitlam Central Station	
4	Clarke Road; Northbound	143 SFU	Weekdays only
5	Clarke Road; Northbound	156 Braid Station	
5	Clarke Road; Northbound	180 Moody Centre Station	
5	Clarke Road; Northbound	N9 Coquitlam Central Station	NightBus service
6	Clarke Road; Southbound	To Lougheed Station: 156, 180	
6	Clarke Road; Southbound	N9 Downtown	NightBus service
