= Tom Middleton (Canadian singer) =

Canadian singer

Tom Middleton is a Canadian pop singer from Victoria, British Columbia.

Tom Middleton's first band, The Marquis, broke up in 1969. In the summer of 1971, Middleton approached Michael Easton, a local Victoria broadcaster, for help entering the recording industry. Easton became Middleton's manager, which led to the signing of a contract with Columbia records. Middleton recorded the album It Wouldn't Have Made Any Difference, which was released in May 1973. The title track made the Canadian top 40 for a month.

Middleton released his second album, One Night Lovers, in early 1976 after the title track peaked at #35. It was followed by "I Need A Harbour For My Soul," backed with "I'll Comfort You," which charted. In late 1976, Middleton was dropped by Columbia Records, and he retired a few months later.

Middleton reunited The Marquis in 1990 for a fundraiser for a boys' soccer team, and he would perform on and off for the next few years. He still occasionally makes appearances on the West Coast, playing blues and jazz festivals as well as occasional club dates.

== Singles ==
- "It Wouldn't Have Made Any Difference" (1973) (#10 CAN)
