= Juno International Achievement Award =

Canadian music award

The Juno Award for International Achievement is a special award, presented at the discretion of the Canadian Academy of Recording Arts and Sciences as recognition for international achievement by musicians from Canada.

== Recipients ==
Year	Image	Recipient	Ref.
1992		Bryan Adams	
1997		Alanis Morissette	
1997		Celine Dion	
1997		Shania Twain	
1999		Celine Dion	
2000		Sarah McLachlan	
2017		Drake	
2018		Arcade Fire	
2022		Shawn Mendes	
2025		Boi-1da	
2026		Daniel Caesar	
