= Streetheart (band) =

Canadian rock band

- Origin: Regina, Saskatchewan, Canada, Winnipeg, Manitoba, Canada (reformed)
- Genres: Rock, hard rock
- Years active: 1977–1983, 1999–present
- Labels: Atlantic, Capitol
- Members: Daryl Gutheil; Ken 'Spider' Sinnaeve; Jeff Neill; Paul McNair; Chris Sutherland
- Past members: Kenny Shields (deceased); Paul Dean; Matt Frenette; Brett M Beer (Frozen Ghost); John Hannah; Herb Ego; Billy Carmassi; George Demeduk
- Website: streetheart.ca kennyshields.com

Streetheart is a Canadian rock band, from Regina, Saskatchewan, and later based in Winnipeg, Manitoba. Their best known songs include "Here Comes the Night" (Them cover), "What Kind of Love is This", and their cover of the Rolling Stones' "Under My Thumb".

== History ==
Keyboard player Daryl Gutheil and bassist Ken "Spider" Sinnaeve formed a band called Witness Inc. in Regina, and later relocated to Winnipeg, where singer Kenny Shields joined the band. After renaming the band Wascana the group finally became Streetheart when guitarist Paul Dean and drummer Matt Frenette joined in 1977. A year later the band released Meanwhile Back in Paris..., and then Under Heaven Over Hell in 1979, after which Frenette dropped out to join Dean in Loverboy. John Hannah played guitars on Under Heaven Over Hell (1979), Quicksand Shoes (1980), and Drugstore Dancer (1980). In 1980, Streetheart won the Juno Award for "Most Promising Group of the Year".

Streetheart released a single in 1979, a disco-hybrid cover version of "Under My Thumb" by the Rolling Stones.

For the next four years they released a string of albums: Quicksand Shoes (1980), Drugstore Dancer (1980), Action: Best of Streetheart (1981), the self-titled Streetheart (1982), Dancing with Danger (1983), and the double live album Live After Dark (1983). Record sales earned them six gold albums and four platinum albums in Canada. The band broke up in 1983, after which a collection of unreleased songs called Buried Treasure was issued in 1984.

Frehley's Comet recorded their own version of "Dancing with Danger" for their 1988 album, Second Sighting. In 1991, Hardline recorded their own version of the Streetheart song "Hot Cherie" for their 1992 album, Double Eclipse.

At the peak of their career, Streetheart toured with several rock bands. Canadian bands included Chilliwack, Rush, Toronto, Harlequin, Max Webster, Aldo Nova, April Wine, and Headpins; American bands included Sammy Hagar, Styx, Kansas, and Blue Öyster Cult. They also toured with AC/DC.

Streetheart received a Juno Award, two Ampex Golden Reel Awards, and a Chimo Award from Music Express Magazine.

In 2008, the band released a 2 CD retrospective collection titled ...Read All About It - The Hits/Anthology.

In 2017, Kenny Shields underwent emergency surgery for a serious heart ailment, which forced the band to cancel all of its touring plans for 2017. They were to play a final farewell concert on August 29, 2017, at the Winnipeg Classic RockFest in Winnipeg, Manitoba. However, Shields died on the morning of July 21, 2017.

In 2026, Shields' estate sued Gutheil, Sinnaeve and Neill over money owed and the use of the band's name.

== Discography ==
Streetheart discography
- Studio albums: 7
- Live albums: 2
- Compilation albums: 7
- Singles: 14

=== Studio albums ===
Title	Album details
Meanwhile Back in Paris...	Released: 1978; Label: Atlantic; Format: Vinyl, LP
Under Heaven Over Hell	Released: 1979; Label: Atlantic; Format: Vinyl, LP
Quicksand Shoes	Released: 1980; Label: WEA; Format: Vinyl, LP
Drugstore Dancer	Released: June 15, 1980; Label: Capitol; Format: Vinyl, LP
Streetheart	Released: 1982; Label: EMI; Format: Vinyl, LP, cassette
Dancing with Danger	Released: March 31, 1983; Label: Boardwalk; Format: Vinyl, LP, cassette
Buried Treasure	Released: 1984; Label: Capitol; Format: Vinyl, LP, cassette

=== Live albums ===
Title	Album details
Live After Dark	Released: October 5, 1983; Label: UMusic; Format: Vinyl, LP
One Night One Take	Released: 2014; Label: N/A; Format: CD, streaming

=== Compilation albums ===
Title	Album details
Action: The Best of Streetheart	Released: June 15, 1981; Label: WEA; Format: Vinyl, LP
Over 60 Minutes with... Streetheart	Released: 1989; Label: Capitol; Format: vinyl, LP, cassette
The Essentials	Released: October 4, 2005; Label: Warner Music; Format: CD
...Read All About It - The Hits / Anthology	Released: 2008; Label: UMusic/Warner Music; Format: CD
40 Vol. I (1977-2017 — 40 Years of Rock and Roll — Vol. I)	Released: 2017; Label: UMusic/Warner Music; Format: Vinyl, LP, digital download
40 Vol. II (1977-2017 — 40 Years of Rock and Roll — Vol. II)	Released: 2017; Label: UMusic/Warner Music; Format: Vinyl, LP, digital download
Life. Legacy. Music.	Released: 2019; Label: UMusic; Format: Digital download, streaming

=== Singles ===
Title	Year	Peak chart position	Album
Title	Year	CAN	Album
"Look at Me"	1978	—	Meanwhile Back in Paris...
"Action"	1978	—	Meanwhile Back in Paris...
"Here Comes the Night"	1979	60	Under Heaven Over Hell
"Hollywood"	1979		Under Heaven Over Hell
"Under My Thumb"	1979	20	Under Heaven Over Hell
"Draggin' You Down"	1980	78	Quicksand Shoes
"Jokes on You"	1980	—	Quicksand Shoes
"Tin Soldier"	1981	—	Drugstore Dancer
"Teenage Rage"	1981	—	Drugstore Dancer
"What Kind of Love is This"	1982	22	Streetheart
"One More Time"	1982		Streetheart
"Look in Your Eyes"	1983	—	Streetheart
"Snow White"	1983	—	Streetheart
"Comin' True"	1983	—	Dancing with Danger

== Band members ==
Current Members

- Daryl Gutheil - keyboards (1977–present)
- Ken "Spider" Sinnaeve - bass (1977–1983, 2019–present)
- Jeff Neill - guitar (1981–1984, 2003–present)
- Paul McNair - vocalist (2018–present)
- Brent Fitz - drums (1993–1996, 2026-present)

Past

- Kenny Shields - vocalist (founding member, 1977–2017; his death)
- Paul Dean - guitar (founding member, 1977–1979)
- Matt Frenette - drums (founding member, 1977–1979)
- John Hannah - guitar (1979–1981: Died 2026)
- Bob (Herb) Ego - drums (1979–1983)
- Marshall B Beer - Keyboards
- Billy Carmassi - drums (1983)
- Bruce Crump - drums (1983–1984: Died 2015)
- Lou Petrovich - guitar (1990's)
- Blair DePape - bass (1998–2006)
- Tim Sutton - drums (2005–2016)
- Bruce "Jake" Jacobs - bass (2007–2016)
- Dylan Thomas Hermiston - drums
- David Langguth - drums (2019)
- Chris Sutherland - drums (2020–2026: his death)
