= Kenny Shields =

- Born: October 24, 1947; Nokomis, Saskatchewan, Canada
- Died: July 21, 2017 (aged 69) Winnipeg, Manitoba, Canada
- Genres: Rock music
- Occupation: Musician
- Formerly of: Streetheart

Kenny Shields (October 24, 1947—July 21, 2017) was a Canadian musician and the lead singer of rock band Streetheart, known for singing various hits, including "Action," "Hollywood," "Look in Your Eyes," "What Kind of Love Is This," and a cover of The Rolling Stones classic "Under My Thumb."

== Early life ==
Shields was born and spent his youth in Nokomis, Saskatchewan, a small farming community. He developed an interest in music early in his life, enrolling in an amateur talent show at six years old.

== Early career ==
Shields moved to Saskatoon to attend the University of Saskatchewan and joined the local band Witness Incorporated. The band started touring the country, opening for Roy Orbison and Cream. His career was sidetracked in 1970 when he was critically injured in a car accident.

Shields returned to music in 1975 and moved to Regina, Saskatchewan as well as Saskatoon, Saskatchewan following the dissolution of Witness Incorporated. He began performing with local musicians and soon formed the band that would become Streetheart. The band became a success in Canada, frequently playing cities across the country and recording six studio albums and one double-disc live album. Their more popular tour mates would include AC/DC, Styx and Max Webster.

== Later career and death ==
After the original Streetheart lineup dissolved, with two of them leaving to form Loverboy, Shields would continue to tour as the Kenny Shields Band throughout the 1980s. He would reunite with some of the original group in the late 1990s to play festival shows.

Heart disease ran strongly in the Shields family, affecting Kenny's grandfather, father, and uncle. Kenny had been dealing with heart issues for over a decade unknown to anyone but immediate family. During his final performance reduced oxygen flow from hereditary cardiac complications contributed directly to the disorientation and memory loss witnessed on stage. This occurred in 2017 at the Canada Day concert in Sherwood Park, Alberta. His demise led to the band cancelling its 40th anniversary tour.

Shields died at St. Boniface General Hospital in Winnipeg. Band mate Jeff Neill, via the band's Facebook page, confirmed on July 21, 2017, that Shields died that morning.
