= Tommy Banks (musician) =

Canadian politician (1936–2018)

The Honourable Tommy Banks OC AOE FRCMT(hon)

Canadian Senator from Alberta
- In office April 7, 2000 – December 17, 2011
- Appointed by: Adrienne Clarkson
- Preceded by: Ron Ghitter

Personal details
- Born: Thomas Benjamin Banks; December 17, 1936 Calgary, Alberta, Canada
- Died: January 25, 2018 (aged 81) Edmonton, Alberta, Canada
- Party: Liberal
- Spouse: Ida Heller
- Profession: Pianist; conductor; composer; television personality; politician

Thomas Benjamin Banks OC AOE FRCMT(hon) (December 17, 1936 – January 25, 2018) was a Canadian pianist, conductor, composer, television personality, and senator. He was appointed to the Senate of Canada on the advice of prime minister Jean Chrétien in 2000 and served as a member of the Liberal caucus until 2011.

== Early life ==
Banks was born in Calgary, Alberta on December 17, 1936. He was born to Benjamin and Laura Banks. He had three brothers: Jim, Terry, and John, and one sister, Wendy. In 1949, the Banks family moved to Edmonton, Alberta.

At 14 years old, he joined the Don Thompson jazz band as a pianist. Together the band toured all over the province of Alberta as a part of the "Jammin the Blues" shows. Four years later he became the music director of the Orion Musical Theatre in Edmonton, where he would eventually meet his future wife Ida Heller.

Banks met his wife Ida Heller when he was the musical director for various stage shows. They were married in 1959, and ten years later, Heller assumed ownership and management of Banks Associated Music Ltd., a talent agency founded by Banks. Together, Ida Heller and Banks had a son, Tom, and daughters Toby and Jill.

== Career ==
In 1956, after earning a license from the American Federation of Musicians, he managed the Associated Entertainment Services of Canada. From there, a decade later, he went on to incorporate two businesses: Tommy Banks Music Limited, and Banks Associated Music, which would later be run by his wife. A few years later he went on to incorporate yet more business, Century II Productions, where he would author numerous commercial jingles in the 60s and 70s.

=== Television and music ===
Banks was the host of syndicated and network television programs, including “The Tommy Banks Show” (1968–1983), “Somewhere There’s Music”, “What’s My Name”, “ Love and Mr. Smith”, “Celebrity Revue”, “Symphony of a Thousand”, “Tommy Banks Jazz”, etc. Banks is credited as being the founder of Edmonton's art scene due to the success of "The Tommy Banks Show" which featured performances from music icons such as Tom Jones and Tina Turner.

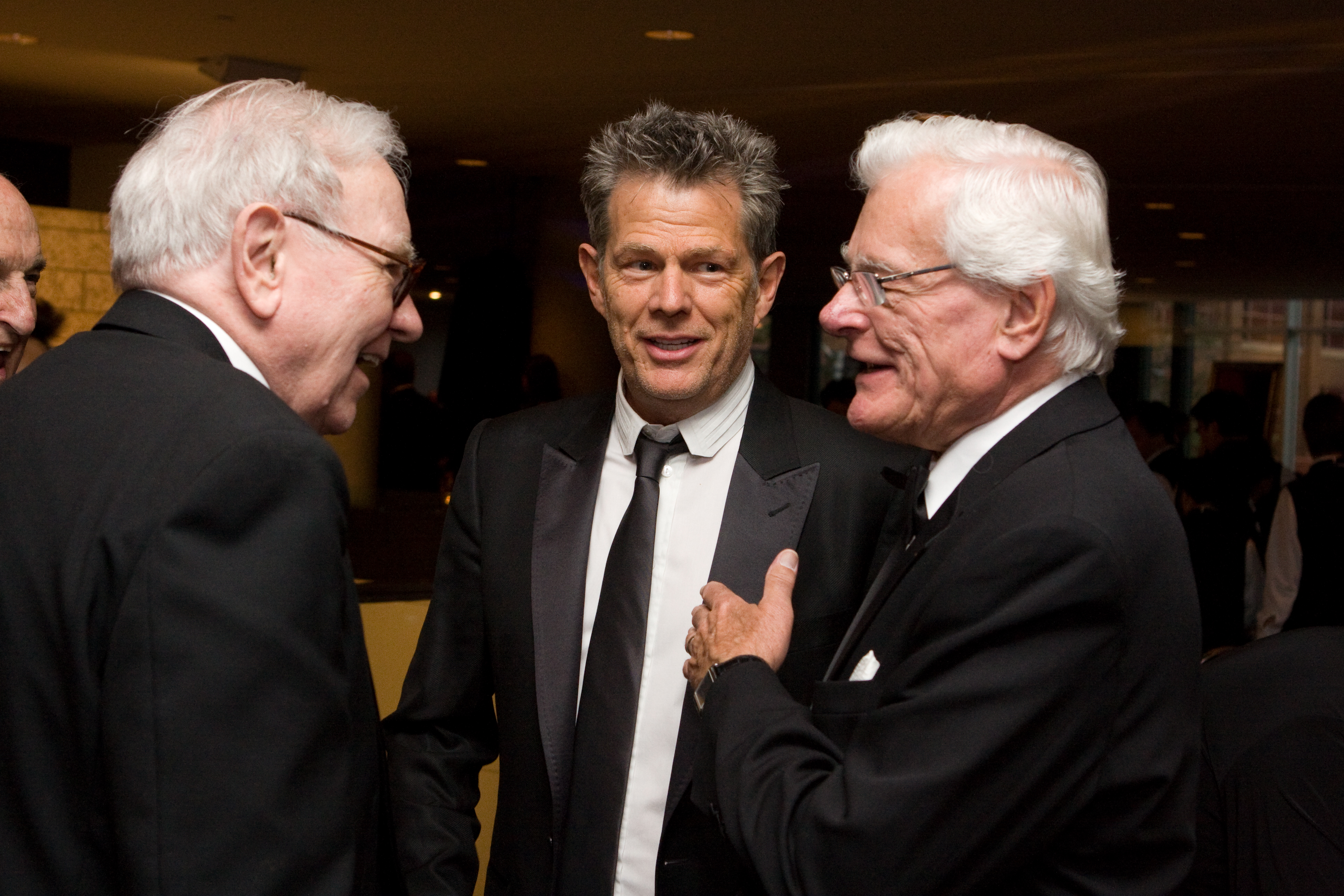
Tommy Banks with Warren Buffett and David Foster.

Banks provided musical direction for the ceremonies of the XI Commonwealth Games, EXPO ’86, the World University Games, the XV Olympic Winter Games, and for several radio and television shows. He produced and/or conducted command performances for Her Majesty the Queen and the Royal Family, and for President Ronald Reagan. He was a member of the A. F. of M., ACTRA, the National Academy of Recording Arts & Sciences (U.S.), the Canadian Academy of Recording Arts & Sciences, and of the Academy of Canadian Cinema & Television. Banks made his jazz-playing debut in 1950 in the touring band of saxophonist Don (D. T.) Thompson. At the age of 15, he performed at Varsity Hall.

Banks served as chair of the Music Committee of the Board of Governors of Alberta College and was the founding chairman of the Alberta Foundation for the Arts. Additionally, he chaired the Music Program at Grant MacEwan Community College and held positions on various boards, including the Edmonton Concert Hall Foundation, the Instrumental Jazz Division of MusicFest Canada, and the B&B Foundation for the Theatrical & Musical Arts of Alberta. Banks was also a member of the board of the CKUA Radio Network Foundation and held honorary positions with the Alberta Heart Fund, Cosmopolitan International, and Rotary International, where he was recognized as a Paul Harris Fellow. Additionally, he is the recipient of an Honorary Diploma of Music from Grant MacEwan College, an Honorary Doctorate of Laws from the University of Alberta, and of the Sir Frederick Haultain Prize. He is an officer of the Order of Canada, and a Member of the Alberta Order of Excellence.

=== Public service ===
Senator Banks was appointed to the Senate by Governor General Adrienne Clarkson at the recommendation of Prime Minister Jean Chrétien in 2000. He represented Alberta, sitting as a Liberal. In the Senate, he served as a member of the Standing Committee on National Finance, of the Special Committee on Illegal Drugs, of the Standing Committee on National Security and Defence (SCONSAD) and on its steering committee, and as chair of the Subcommittee on Veterans’ Affairs. In the 37th, 38th, and 39th Parliaments, Tommy Banks was elected Chair of the Standing Committee on Energy, the Environment, and Natural Resources. Additionally, during the 37th and 38th Parliaments, he held the position of Chair of the Alberta Liberal Parliamentary Caucus. After the dissolution of the 37th Parliament, Senator Banks was appointed to an all-party committee consisting of members from both Houses of Parliament, tasked with advising the Government on the implementation of parliamentary oversight in matters related to security intelligence. Additionally, he contributed to various ad hoc committees within the Senate. He served as the vice-chair of the Caucus Task Force on Urban Issues.

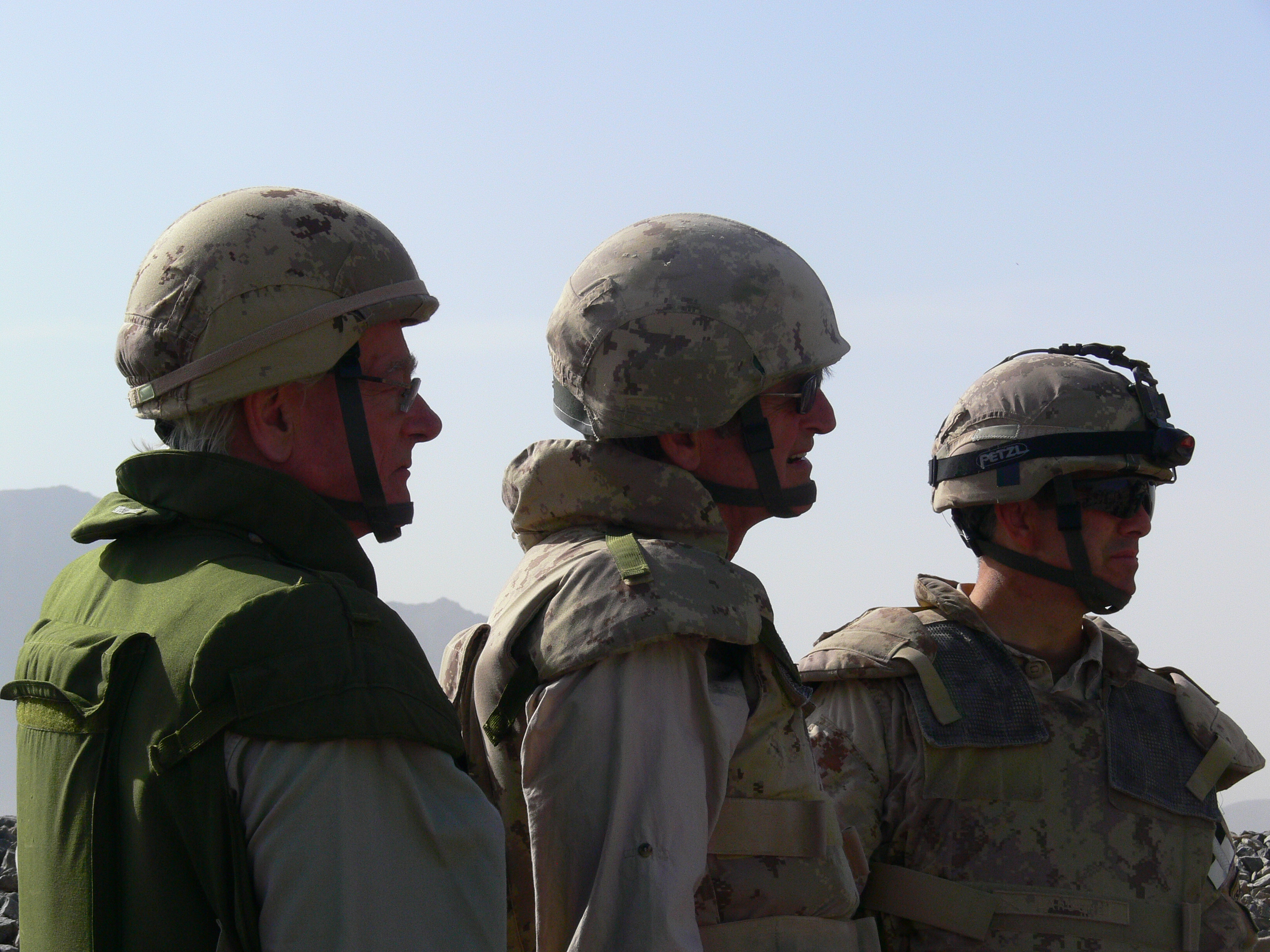
Tommy Banks in Afghanistan surveying the experiences of the Canadian Forces in the war on terrorism.

During his tenure as a Senator representing Alberta from 2000 to 2011, Banks participated in various committees and panels, including one that provided advice to the government during the North American Free Trade Agreement negotiations. He was the founding chairman of the Alberta Foundation for the Arts and was honored as an Officer of the Order of Canada.

Tommy Banks was appointed to the Senate of Canada on April 7, 2000. On May 9, 2001, he received the role of vice-chair for the Prime Minister's Caucus Task Force on Urban Issues.

== Honours ==
=== Titles ===
- December 17, 1936 – April 7, 2000: Mr. Thomas Benjamin Banks
- April 7, 2000 – : The Honourable Thomas Benjamin Banks

As a former senator, Banks was entitled to be styled The Honourable for life.

=== Honours ===
Ribbon bar of Tommy Banks

In order, these ribbons symbolize Banks': Order of Canada, Alberta Order of Excellence, Queen Elizabeth II Golden Jubilee Medal, 125th Anniversary of the Confederation of Canada Medal, Queen Elizabeth II Diamond Jubilee Medal, Alberta Centennial Medal

=== Awards ===
- Best Jazz Album (Jazz Canada Montreux 1978), Juno Awards (1979)
- Grand Prix du Disques-Canada, Canadian Music Council (1979)
- Inducted into the Edmonton Cultural Hall of Fame (1986)
- Sir Frederick Haultain Prize, Province of Alberta (1990)
- Best Performance in a Variety Program or Series (The 1990 Canadian Country Music Awards), Gemini Awards (1992)
- Inducted into the Alberta Order of Excellence (1993)
- Special Achievement Award, SOCAN (2010)

=== Honorary degrees ===
Jurisdiction	Date	School	Degree
Alberta	1979	Grant MacEwan College	Honorary Diploma of Music
Alberta	1987	University of Alberta	Honorary Degree, LLD

== Legislative items ==
=== Authored ===
- The Statutes Repeal Act, (2008)
- An Act to Amend the Federal Sustainable Development Act (2008)
- Auditor General Act (involvement of Parliament) (2010)

=== Sponsored ===
- Canada National Parks Act (2000)
- Canada National Marine Conservation Act (2001)
- Act to Establish the Department of Public Safety and Emergency Preparedness (2005)
- Act to Amend the Migratory Birds Convention (1994)
- Species At Risk Act (2002)
- Canadian Environmental Protection Act 1999 (2005)
- Canada Border Services Agency Act (2005)
- Act to Amend the Criminal Code (justification for detention in custody) (2010)

== Discography ==
Selected Currently-Available Recordings
Yes Indeed,	Solo piano	RRI 300–9647
For Dancers Only	Tommy Banks Big Band	RRI 300–9650
At the Montreux Festival**	Tommy Banks Big Band	RRI 300–9752
Big Miller	Banks Big Band/Quartet	CIICD 10974
The Holiday Season	Tommy Banks & Many Friends	RCD-0268
In The Middle of the Road	Tommy Banks & Many Friends	TBCD 1010
Tommy Banks's Christmas	Piano & Orchestra	TBCD 1308
Old Friends	P. J. Perry & Tommy Banks	TBCD 1312
Legacy Live*	Jens Lindemann & Tommy Banks	Ind.
Sweet Canadiana*	Order of Canada Soloists	Ind.
Make Someone Happy	Tommy Banks & Judi Singh	

On Century II Records, distributed by Royalty Records.

** JUNO Award winner * JUNO Award nominee

== Musical appearances and guest conducting ==
=== Appearances ===
- When Johnny Went Plowing For Kearon - Tommy Banks & John Cousins (1976)
- Pieces Of Dreams - Various (1977)
- Hit That Jive Jack- Various – (Go West) A Vital Collection Of Western Canadian Music (1999)

=== Guest conducted ===
- Budapest Symphony Orchestra of the Hungarian State Radio & Television
- Calgary Philharmonic Orchestra
- Chattanooga Symphony Orchestra
- Edmonton Symphony Orchestra
- Hamilton Philharmonic Orchestra
- Kitchener-Waterloo Symphony Orchestra
- Lethbridge Symphony Orchestra
- Memphis Symphony Orchestra
- National Arts Centre Orchestra
- Regina Symphony Orchestra
- Saskatoon Symphony Orchestra
- Southwest Florida Symphony Orchestra
- Toledo Symphony Orchestra
- The Toronto Symphony
- Vancouver Symphony Orchestra
- Symphony Nova-Scotia
- Winnipeg Symphony Orchestra
