= List of Canadian musicians =

This is a list of Canadian musicians. Only notable individuals appear here; bands are listed at List of bands from Canada.

== 0-9 ==
- 2Rude – hip hop/R&B record producer
- 347aidan – rapper

== A ==
- Lee Aaron – jazz and rock singer-songwriter, also known as "Metal Queen"
- Abdominal – hip-hop musician
- Adaline – singer-songwriter
- Bryan Adams – singer-songwriter
- Bernard Adamus – singer-songwriter
- Susan Aglukark – folk-pop singer-songwriter
- AHI – folk singer-songwriter
- Lydia Ainsworth – composer/singer
- Robert Aitken – composer, flute player
- Chuckie Akenz – rapper, songwriter
- Pierrette Alarie – opera singer
- Emma Albani – opera singer
- Jeremie Albino – country/roots rock singer-songwriter
- Coco Love Alcorn – pop singer
- John Alcorn – jazz singer
- Don Alder – fingerstyle guitarist, singer-songwriter, composer
- Toya Alexis – R&B singer
- Madeleine Allakariallak – Inuk throat singer, folk singer
- Chad Allan – singer (the Guess Who)
- Andrew Allen – singer
- John P. Allen – bluegrass, country and rock fiddler
- Lillian Allen – dub poet
- Archie Alleyne – jazz drummer
- a l l i e – R&B singer
- Allie X – singer-songwriter
- Tommy Alto – indie rock singer-songwriter
- Don Amero – singer-songwriter
- Barbra Amesbury – singer-songwriter
- Ammoye – reggae singer
- Amylie – pop singer-songwriter
- Anachnid – pop/electronic singer-songwriter
- Laura Anglade – jazz singer
- Charlie Angus – alternative country singer-songwriter, writer, politician
- Paul Anka – singer-songwriter, 1950s pop star
- Matt Andersen – singer-songwriter
- Kerri Anderson – pop singer
- James Anthony – blues guitarist
- Tafari Anthony – rhythm and blues singer
- Alan Anton – bassist (Cowboy Junkies)
- Aphrose – soul/R&B singer
- Natalie Appleton – singer (All Saints)
- Aqyila – rhythm and blues singer
- Violet Archer – composer
- Jann Arden – pop singer-songwriter
- Ardn – rapper
- Carolyn Arends – Contemporary Christian pop singer
- Susie Arioli – jazz singer
- Julian Armour – cellist
- John Arpin – pianist, composer, recording artist, entertainer
- Marie-Pierre Arthur – pop singer-songwriter
- Talena Atfield – bassist (Kittie)
- Athésia – pop/dance singer
- Allison Au – jazz saxophonist
- Rich Aucoin – indie rock singer-songwriter
- Viviane Audet – singer, composer
- Melissa Auf der Maur – rock bassist (Hole, the Smashing Pumpkins)
- Shawn Austin – country singer and songwriter
- Eva Avila – singer (winner of Canadian Idol, 2006)
- Mike Ayley – singer, bass guitarist (Marianas Trench)
- Jay Aymar – guitarist and singer-songwriter
- Marcel Aymar – singer-songwriter
- Aysanabee – singer-songwriter
- Caroline Azar – singer-songwriter, keyboardist (Fifth Column)

== B ==
- Baby Nova – singer-songwriter
- Sebastian Bach – rock singer
- Randy Bachman – rock singer, guitarist
- Tal Bachman – singer (son of Randy Bachman)
- Back Alley John – blues singer-songwriter, harmonica player
- Backxwash – rapper
- Bad News Brown – rapper
- Bahamas – folk singer-guitarist
- Jason Bajada – singer-songwriter
- Carroll Baker – country music singer
- Tim Baker – indie rock singer-songwriter
- James Baley – rhythm and blues/dance singer
- Gord Bamford – country singer
- Buddy Banks – jazz double-bassist
- Lanie Banks – Canadian-Ugandan rapper
- Del Barber – singer-songwriter
- Steve Barakatt – composer-pianist
- Jill Barber – singer-songwriter
- Matthew Barber – singer-songwriter
- Barlow – composer, rock
- Emilie-Claire Barlow – singer-songwriter
- Kim Barlow – singer-songwriter
- Quinton Barnes – R&B/electronic singer
- Alexis Baro – jazz, rhythm and blues trumpeter
- Laura Barrett – singer-songwriter, kalimba player
- Claudja Barry – disco singer
- Mary Barry – singer-songwriter, composer, pianist, jazz, blues, chanson
- Yank Barry – rock singer, composer, guitar, percussion
- Miguel de la Bastide – flamenco guitarist
- Annie Mottram Craig Batten – singer, vocal teacher, composer
- Isabel Bayrakdarian – soprano
- Kevin Bazinet – pop singer
- Bobby Bazini – singer-songwriter
- bbno$ – rapper, singer-songwriter
- Gary Beals – R&B singer
- Eric Bearclaw – guitarist
- Martin Beaver – violinist
- Dany Bédar – singer-songwriter
- Gabriela Bee – singer-songwriter
- Jaymz Bee – singer, music director
- Begonia — singer
- Dan Bejar – singer-songwriter (Destroyer; Swan Lake; Hello, Blue Roses; the New Pornographers)
- Daniel Bélanger – pop, electro, rock, ambience singer
- Steve Bell – guitarist, singer-songwriter
- Clayton Bellamy – singer-songwriter
- Belly – rapper, songwriter
- Quanteisha Benjamin – singer
- Eli Bennett – saxophonist, composer
- Willie P. Bennett – folk/alternative country singer-songwriter
- Ridley Bent – country singer
- Barney Bentall – rock singer-songwriter
- Beppie – children's musician
- Jennifer Berezan – singer-songwriter, producer
- Moe Berg – singer-songwriter (Pursuit of Happiness)
- Art Bergmann – punk/alternative singer-songwriter
- Ruth Berhe – singer-songwriter
- Camille Bernard – opera singer
- Mario Bernardi – conductor, pianist
- Geoff Berner – klezmer/folk accordionist, singer-songwriter
- Larry Berrio – country singer-songwriter
- Salome Bey – blues/gospel/jazz singer
- Amélie Beyries – pop singer-songwriter
- Laila Biali – jazz singer/pianist
- Ed Bickert – jazz guitarist
- Charlie Biddle – jazz bassist
- Dave Bidini – guitarist (Rheostatics)
- Justin Bieber – pop singer-songwriter
- Big Rude Jake – singer-songwriter, band leader, blues shouter, guitarist
- Dan Bigras – singer-songwriter
- Kim Bingham – rock/ska singer-songwriter
- Heather Bishop – folk singer-songwriter
- Jaydee Bixby – country singer
- Annesley Black (born 1979) – composer
- Gwendolyn Black – pianist, educator and activist
- Jully Black – R&B musician
- Stacey Blades – guitarist (L.A. Guns)
- Jason Blaine – country singer
- Jean-Michel Blais – composer and pianist
- Forest Blakk – pop singer
- Paul Bley – jazz pianist
- Omar Blondahl – singer
- George Blondheim – pianist, composer
- Joe Bocan – pop singer
- La Bolduc – singer-songwriter, harmonicist, violinist
- Mars Bonfire – from Steppenwolf
- Jonas Bonnetta – singer-songwriter
- Bonky (Onno Borgen) – trance musician
- Will Bonness – jazz pianist
- Boogat – rapper
- Dave Bookman – indie rock singer-songwriter
- Brian Borcherdt – singer-songwriter
- John Borra – singer-songwriter and bassist
- Bob Bossin – folk singer-songwriter, activist; co-founded the Canadian folk group Stringband with Marie-Lynn Hammond
- Boslen – rapper
- Robi Botos – jazz pianist
- John Bottomley – singer-songwriter
- Grimes (Claire Boucher) – singer, songwriter, artist
- Isabelle Boulay – pop singer
- Gerry Boulet – rock singer
- Bill Bourne – folk/alternative singer-songwriter
- Pierre Bouvier – singer-songwriter, guitarist (Reset, Simple Plan)
- Mitch Bowden – rock singer, guitarist (Don Vail, the Priddle Concern, Chore)
- Laurie Bower – jazz and pop singer and trombonist
- Benjamin Bowman – violinist
- Jimmy Bowskill – blues guitarist, bassist and singer
- Boy Golden – alternative country singer-songwriter
- Liona Boyd – classical guitarist
- Philippe Brach – singer-songwriter
- David Bradstreet – singer-songwriter
- Tim Brady – electric guitarist, composer, improviser, working in contemporary classical, experimental, musique actuelle
- Andru Branch – singer-songwriter, keyboardist (Andru Branch, Halfway Tree)
- Paul Brandt – country singer-songwriter
- Russell Braun – operatic baritone
- Lenny Breau – guitarist
- Beverly Breckenridge – bassist (Fifth Column and Phono-Comb)
- Michael Breen – pop/rock singer and guitarist
- Dean Brody – country singer-songwriter
- Lisa Brokop – country singer-songwriter
- Michael Brook – guitarist, producer, film scorer
- Alma Faye Brooks – disco, soul and R&B singer
- Jon Brooks – folk singer-songwriter
- Colleen Brown – singer-songwriter
- Divine Brown – R&B/soul singer
- Michael Jerome Browne – blues singer and guitarist
- Edwin Orion Brownell – neo-classical composer, pianist
- Chad Brownlee – country singer
- Measha Brueggergosman – operatic soprano
- Roxane Bruneau – pop singer
- Paul Brunelle – country music guitarist, songwriter
- Rod Bruno – singer-songwriter, guitarist
- Billy Bryans – percussionist, record producer
- Jon Bryant – singer-songwriter
- Dan Bryk – singer-songwriter
- Jim Bryson – singer-songwriter
- Michael Bublé – singer
- Buck 65 – hip-hop artist
- Basia Bulat – singer-songwriter
- George Burdi
- Malcolm Burn – singer, record producer
- Louise Burns – singer-songwriter
- Jason Burnstick – folk singer-songwriter
- Spencer Burton – indie rock and country singer-songwriter
- Win Butler – member of Arcade Fire
- Matthew Byrne – folk singer-songwriter

== C ==
- Meryn Cadell – rock singer-songwriter, performance artist
- Cadence Weapon – rapper
- Daniel Caesar – R&B, singer-songwriter
- Buddy Cage – pedal steel guitar player
- Shawna Cain – Christian R&B singer
- Kathryn Calder – indie rock/pop singer-songwriter
- John Allan Cameron – folk singer, guitarist
- Steph Cameron – folk singer-songwriter
- Cherie Camp – singer-songwriter
- James Campbell – clarinetist
- Torquil Campbell – singer-songwriter (Stars)
- Brendan Canning – singer-songwriter (Broken Social Scene, Valley of the Giants)
- Patricia Cano – jazz/Latin music singer and musical theatre actress
- Lou Canon – singer-songwriter
- George Canyon – country singer
- Ben Caplan – folk musician
- Alessia Cara – contemporary R&B
- Craig Cardiff – singer-songwriter
- Charlotte Cardin – pop singer
- Celeigh Cardinal – singer-songwriter
- Paul Cargnello – singer-songwriter
- Jean Carignan – fiddler
- Marie Carmen – pop singer, musical theatre actor (Starmania)
- Glory-Anne Carriere – country singer
- Stef Carse – country and pop singer
- Wilf Carter – country singer
- Jazz Cartier – rapper
- João Carvalho – recording and mastering engineer, producer and musician
- Andrew Cash – singer-songwriter
- Peter Cash – singer-songwriter
- Barbara Cass-Beggs – singer
- Andrew Cassara – pop singer-songwriter
- Ian Casselman – singer, drummer (Marianas Trench)
- Lou-Adriane Cassidy – pop singer-songwriter
- Tory Cassis – folk and jazz singer
- France Castel – pop and blues singer, musical theatre actress
- Jennifer Castle – singer-songwriter
- Demo Cates – jazz/R&B saxophonist and singer
- Rachel Cavalho – pianist, music educator
- Cayouche – singer-songwriter
- David Celia – singer-songwriter
- CFCF – electronic musician
- Tim Chaisson – singer-songwriter
- Chantal Chamandy – pop/dance singer-songwriter
- Champion – DJ, electronic musician
- Keshia Chanté – urban/R&B singer
- Mathieu Charbonneau – keyboardist, composer
- Robert Charlebois – rock and funk singer
- Chloe Charles – soul pop singer
- Gregory Charles – chorister and pianist
- Nuela Charles – soul/pop/R&B/hip hop singer
- Tanika Charles – soul and rhythm and blues singer
- Régine Chassagne – member of Arcade Fire
- Checkmate – rapper
- Vern Cheechoo – country singer-songwriter
- Brad Cheeseman – jazz bassist and composer
- Rita Chiarelli – blues singer
- Ramon Chicharron – Latin music singer and songwriter
- Jane Child – pop and rock dance artist, songwriter, producer
- Choclair – hip-hop artist
- Charlene Choi – pop singer in Hong Kong
- Gina Choi – South Korean singer
- Tommy Chong – guitarist (Bobby Taylor & the Vancouvers), comedian
- Timothy Chooi – violinist
- Christophe – pop singer
- Jarvis Church – R&B singer-producer (real name Gerald Eaton)
- Annabelle Chvostek – folk singer
- Cikwes – traditional Cree music singer
- Clairmont the Second – rapper
- Terri Clark – country singer-songwriter
- Alanna Clarke – pop/rock singer-songwriter
- Classified – rapper
- Renée Claude – singer
- Véronique Claveau – musical theatre actress
- David Clayton-Thomas – singer
- Jim Clench – bassist, vocalist (April Wine, Bachman–Turner Overdrive)
- Kevin Closs – singer-songwriter
- William Cloutier – pop singer
- Tom Cochrane – singer-songwriter
- Bruce Cockburn – singer-songwriter
- Code Pie – indie-pop/rock
- Ora Cogan – singer-songwriter
- Leonard Cohen – singer-songwriter, poet
- Cold Specks – soul singer
- Holly Cole – jazz singer
- Naida Cole – pianist
- Raquel Cole – country pop singer-songwriter
- Don Coleman – rock singer
- Jason Collett – singer-songwriter (also member of Broken Social Scene)
- Dorothy Collins – pop singer
- Simon Collins – pop/electronic musician
- Chuck Comeau – drummer (Reset, Simple Plan)
- Ray Condo – rockabilly singer
- Chantal Condor – singer
- Tyler Connolly – singer-songwriter, guitarist (Theory of a Deadman)
- Stompin' Tom Connors – country singer-songwriter
- Jesse Cook – guitarist, producer, composer
- Robin-Joël Cool – songwriter, composer
- Spirit Cool – live-looping acoustic guitarist, singer
- Bill Coon – guitarist, composer
- Jim Corcoran – singer-songwriter, radio personality
- J. P. Cormier – singer, guitarist
- Jacinta Cormier – singer, pianist
- Louis-Jean Cormier – rock singer-songwriter
- Corneille – funk, R&B, soul singer-songwriter
- Charlotte Cornfield – singer-songwriter
- Antoine Corriveau – singer-songwriter
- Michel Corriveau – keyboardist, composer
- Pierre-Philippe Côté – singer-songwriter, composer
- Ève Cournoyer – pop and rock singer
- Rose Cousins – singer-songwriter
- Deborah Cox – pop/R&B singer
- Jonny Craig – vocalist, songwriter, ex-front man for Dance Gavin Dance, front man for Emarosa and Isles and Glaciers
- Sara Craig – singer-songwriter
- Terri Crawford – rock singer, children's entertainer
- Siobhan Crawley – pop singer
- Jim Creeggan – singer-songwriter, member of the Barenaked Ladies and the Brothers Creeggan
- Andy Creeggan – singer-songwriter, former member of the Barenaked Ladies and the Brothers Creeggan
- CRi – electronic producer
- Cold Specks (Ladan Hussein) – soul musician
- Colin Cripps – rock guitarist, producer (Crash Vegas)
- Julie Crochetière – singer-songwriter, pianist (jazz, pop, R&B, soul)
- John Crossingham – rock singer (Raising the Fawn)
- Allison Crowe – singer-songwriter
- Alex Cuba – jazz/pop singer-songwriter
- Devin Cuddy – country/blues singer
- Jim Cuddy – rock singer (Blue Rodeo)
- Eliana Cuevas – jazz/Latin singer
- Lori Cullen – pop/jazz singer
- Burton Cummings – rock musician (the Guess Who, solo artist)
- Chris Cummings – country singer-songwriter
- Amelia Curran – singer-songwriter
- Andy Curran – rock singer and bassist
- Bobby Curtola – singer
- Isabelle Cyr – singer

== D ==
- Ryan Dahle – guitarist (Limblifter)
- Gail Dahms – pop singer, musical theatre actress
- Lisa Dalbello – singer-songwriter
- Sean Dalton – drummer (The Trews)
- France D'Amour – singer-songwriter
- Leah Daniels – country singer-songwriter
- Rick Danko – bassist, violinist, guitarist, singer (the Band)
- Mychael Danna – film composer
- D'Ari – rock singer-songwriter
- Catherine Souffront Darbouze – rhythm and blues singer
- Datsik – dubstep artist
- Benoît David – singer (Mystery)
- Marie Davidson – EDM singer and producer
- Maïa Davies – singer-songwriter
- Mark Davis – singer-songwriter
- Stu Davis – singer-songwriter, guitarist
- Tanya Davis – singer-songwriter, poet
- Desirée Dawson – singer-songwriter, ukulele player
- Dax – rapper
- Sophie Day – jazz singer
- Luc de Larochellière – singer-songwriter
- deadmau5 – house artist, electronic music producer, real name Joel Zimmerman
- Aselin Debison – Celtic pop
- Art d'Ecco – indie rock, glam rock singer
- Tony Dekker – folk rock singer-songwriter (Great Lake Swimmers)
- Gordon Delamont – big-band conductor, arranger, teacher
- Helena Deland – singer-songwriter
- Mac DeMarco – indie rock musician
- Kris Demeanor – singer-songwriter
- Simone Denny – dance/house/pop/techno singer
- Gisela Depkat – cellist
- Richard Desjardins – singer
- Shawn Desman – pop, R&B singer
- Lorraine Desmarais – jazz pianist, composer
- Dave "Rave" Desroches – singer-songwriter (Teenage Head, the Dave Rave Conspiracy)
- David Desrosiers – bassist, singer (Reset, Simple Plan)
- Marie-Michèle Desrosiers – pop and rock singer
- Angela Desveaux – singer-songwriter
- Devon – rapper
- Devours – electronic musician
- Alpha Yaya Diallo – guitarist, composer
- Scott Dibble – singer-songwriter (Scott Dibble and Watertown)
- Steffi DiDomenicantonio – pop singer, musical theatre actress
- DijahSB – rapper
- Hugh Dillon – frontman of Headstones and Hugh Dillon Redemption Choir
- Natalie Di Luccio – singer, soprano
- Céline Dion – pop singer
- Carl Dixon – singer-songwriter, guitarist
- DL Incognito – rapper
- Creighton Doane – drummer, songwriter
- Melanie Doane – guitarist, singer-songwriter
- Bonnie Dobson – singer-songwriter, guitarist
- Fefe Dobson – singer-songwriter
- Dr. Draw – electronic violinist, composer
- Denny Doherty – singer (the Mamas & the Papas)
- Julie Doiron – singer-songwriter
- Nicole Dollanganger – singer-songwriter
- Luke Doucet – singer-songwriter
- Jerry Doucette – guitarist, singer-songwriter
- Gordon Downie – singer (Tragically Hip)
- Aaryn Doyle – rapper, singer-songwriter
- Alan Doyle – singer, guitarist (Great Big Sea)
- Damhnait Doyle – pop singer-songwriter
- Drake – rapper, singer, actor
- Kevin Drew – guitarist, singer-songwriter
- Glen Drover – guitarist (Megadeth, Eidolon)
- Shawn Drover – drummer (Megadeth, Eidolon)
- Ian D'Sa – songwriter, vocalist, guitarist (Billy Talent)
- Dubmatix – reggae/electronic musician
- Claude Dubois – pop singer-songwriter, musical theatre actor
- Martin Dubreuil – tambourinist (Les Breastfeeders)
- Annette Ducharme – singer, songwriter
- Armond Duck Chief – country singer-songwriter
- Victoria Duffield – singer-songwriter
- Dumas – Québécois singer
- Kyle Bobby Dunn – composer, musician, live performer
- Marc Dupré – singer-songwriter, comedian
- Élie Dupuis – singer, pianist
- Shae Dupuy – country singer-songwriter
- Melanie Durrant – R&B singer
- Bill Durst – guitarist (Thundermug)
- Matt Dusk – jazz singer-songwriter
- Jeremy Dutcher – singer
- DVBBS – DJ, producer
- Paul Dwayne – country singer-songwriter
- Phil Dwyer – jazz saxophonist
- Jesse Aaron Dwyre – drummer
- Howard Dyck – conductor, broadcaster
- Félix Dyotte – singer-songwriter

== E ==
- Fred Eaglesmith – alternative country singer-songwriter
- Jade Eagleson – country music singer-songwriter
- Eddie Eastman – country music singer-songwriter, Juno Award winner
- Chris Eaton – indie rock singer-songwriter
- Gerald Eaton – R&B singer, producer (known as Jarvis Church)
- Mike Edel – folk musician & guitarist
- Jerry Edmonton – drummer (Steppenwolf); his brother wrote "Born to Be Wild" under the pseudonym Mars Bonfire
- Kathleen Edwards – singer-songwriter
- Efajemue – jazz drummer
- Coral Egan – pop, jazz singer
- Thompson Egbo-Egbo – jazz pianist
- James Ehnes – violin virtuoso
- Eightcubed – electronic artist
- Shirley Eikhard – singer-songwriter
- Elisapie – pop singer
- Peter Elkas – singer-songwriter
- Lindsay Ell – country singer
- Emanuel – rhythm and blues singer
- Emma-Lee – singer-songwriter, photographer
- Rik Emmett – singer-songwriter (former member of Triumph)
- Ariel Engle – indie pop singer (Broken Social Scene, La Force)
- Matt Epp – singer-songwriter
- Quique Escamilla – singer-songwriter
- Esthero – singer-songwriter
- Elise Estrada – pop singer
- Emmalyn Estrada – pop singer (G.R.L)
- Eternia – rapper
- Quin Etheridge-Pedden – fiddler
- Andre Ethier – rock singer-songwriter
- Eric Ethridge – country singer-songwriter
- George Evans – jazz vocalist
- Gil Evans – pianist, arranger
- Kellylee Evans – jazz/soul vocalist
- Eva Everything – New Wave pop singer, television composer
- Mike Evin – pop singer-songwriter
- Excision – dubstep artist
- Bob Ezrin – musician, producer of The Wall by Pink Floyd

== F ==
- Andrew F – singer-songwriter, pop rock singer
- Lara Fabian – pop singer
- Eria Fachin – dance/pop singer
- Julie Fader – folk-pop singer-songwriter, keyboardist
- Bruce Fairbairn – musician, rock band producer (Aerosmith, Bon Jovi, Loverboy)
- Percy Faith – composer
- Famous – rapper
- Todd Fancey – bassist (the New Pornographers), singer-songwriter
- Faouzia – singer-songwriter, musician
- Mylène Farmer – singer
- Robert Farnon – arranger, composer, conductor
- Stephen Fearing – singer-songwriter
- Leslie Feist – pop singer-songwriter
- Christine Fellows – folk-pop singer-songwriter
- Kate Fenner – singer-songwriter
- Jay Ferguson – power pop singer-songwriter, guitarist (Sloan)
- Maynard Ferguson – jazz band leader, trumpet
- Danny Fernandes – pop singer
- Ferron – folk singer-songwriter
- Michael Feuerstack – singer-songwriter, guitarist (Wooden Stars, Snailhouse)
- Janina Fialkowska – pianist
- Dominique Fils-Aimé – jazz, rhythm and blues singer
- Hank Fisher – known as Washboard Hank, singer-songwriter and multi-instrument entertainer
- Jeremy Fisher – singer-songwriter
- Brent Fitz – drummer, pianist (Slash, Theory of a Deadman, Alice Cooper, Vince Neil, Union)
- Warren Dean Flandez – R&B, gospel singer
- Jon-Rae Fletcher – rock singer-songwriter
- Luca Fogale – pop singer
- Peter Foldy – singer-songwriter
- Sue Foley – blues singer-songwriter
- Roy Forbes – folk music singer-songwriter
- Frazey Ford – folk music guitarist, singer-songwriter (the Be Good Tanyas)
- Angel Forrest – singer
- Maureen Forrester – contralto
- Judith Forst – operatic mezzo-soprano
- Amanda Forsyth – cellist
- Marc Fortier – singer-songwriter, guitarist
- Fred Fortin – rock singer-songwriter, guitarist, drummer
- J.D. Fortune – former INXS lead singer
- David Foster – composer, producer, pianist, vocalist
- FouKi – rapper
- Jeanick Fournier – singer, Canada's Got Talent season 2 winner
- George Fox – country singer-songwriter
- Foxtrott – electronic/indie pop musician
- David Francey – folk singer-songwriter
- Angelique Francis – blues singer
- Frankenstein – rapper and record producer
- Allan Fraser – folk singer-songwriter (formerly of Fraser & DeBolt)
- Fredz – rapper
- Matt Frenette – drummer (Headpins, Loverboy, Streetheart)
- Fresh I.E. – Christian rapper
- Alan Frew – singer-songwriter (Glass Tiger)
- Debby Friday – electronic musician
- Allen Froese – contemporary Christian singer
- Lily Frost – singer-songwriter, performer and recording artist
- Georgette Fry – blues singer, songwriter, choir director
- Rhys Fulber – electronic musician/producer, Front Line Assembly, Delerium, Conjure One
- Aaron Funk – breakcore artist
- Lewis Furey – rock singer-songwriter, film music composer
- Nelly Furtado – R&B/pop singer-songwriter, record producer, actress

== G ==
- B. B. Gabor – new wave artist
- André Gagnon – pianist, composer
- John Harvey Gahan – violinist
- Jonathan Gallant – bassist (Billy Talent)
- Lennie Gallant – singer-songwriter
- Patsy Gallant – singer
- Edward Gamblin – singer-songwriter
- Daniel Gardner – electronic musician
- Yoan Garneau – singer-songwriter
- Gale Garnett – singer-songwriter of the 1964 Top 10 Hit "We'll Sing in the Sunshine"
- Garou – singer
- Amos Garrett – guitarist, singer
- Sebastian Gaskin – R&B singer-songwriter
- Ali Gatie – singer-songwriter
- Nadia Gaudet – folk singer-songwriter
- Karina Gauvin – soprano
- Gayance – electronic/house DJ
- Eric Genuis – composer, pianist
- Hannah Georgas – singer-songwriter
- Jian Ghomeshi – singer, broadcaster, writer, producer
- Joel Gibb – singer-songwriter (the Hidden Cameras)
- Tim Gilbertson – singer-songwriter
- Nick Gilder – singer-songwriter, "Hot Child in the City"
- Flora Gionest – singer-songwriter
- Fernande Giroux – jazz singer
- Martin Giroux – singer
- Alice Glass – lyricist, vocalist (Crystal Castles)
- Greg Godovitz – singer, bass guitarist
- Gary Pig Gold – singer-songwriter, guitarist (Dave Rave), producer (Simply Saucer)
- Roxanne Goldade – country singer
- Rose Goldblatt – pianist
- Kat Goldman – singer-songwriter
- Anthony Gomes – guitarist, singer-songwriter
- Adam Gontier – singer (Three Days Grace, Saint Asonia)
- Chilly Gonzales – classical musician
- Matthew Good – singer-songwriter (Matthew Good Band)
- Myles Goodwyn – singer-songwriter, guitarist (April Wine)
- James Gordon – singer-songwriter
- Valery Gore – singer-songwriter
- Rex Goudie – singer-songwriter (Canadian Idol runner-up, 2005)
- Denis Gougeon – composer
- Glenn Gould – classical pianist, composer, philosopher
- Robert Goulet – baritone singer, Broadway musical star
- Lawrence Gowan – rock singer (solo, Styx)
- Max Graham – house DJ
- Sebastien Grainger – singer, drummer, percussionist (Death from Above 1979)
- Gil Grand – country singer-songwriter
- Jenn Grant – singer-songwriter
- Justin Gray – jazz bassist, recording engineer
- Saya Gray – alternative pop bassist
- Gordon Grdina – jazz, indie rock and world music guitarist
- Dallas Green – singer-songwriter, guitarist (Alexisonfire, City and Colour)
- Brian Greenway – guitarist, harmonicist, vocalist (April Wine, Mashmakhan)
- Joey Gregorash
- Adam Gregory – country musician
- Grimes (Claire Boucher) – singer-songwriter, visual artist, music video director
- Matthew Grimson – singer-songwriter
- Paul Gross – singer-songwriter, actor, producer
- Emm Gryner – singer-songwriter, pianist, guitarist
- Jean "Guilda" Guida – cabaret pop singer
- Molly Guldemond – singer, synthesizer player (Mother Mother)
- Ryan Guldemond – singer-songwriter, guitarist (Mother Mother)
- Jim Guthrie – singer-songwriter
- Trevor Guthrie – singer-songwriter, formerly of SoulDecision
- Bruce Guthro – singer-songwriter (lead vocalist of Runrig)
- Caity Gyorgy – jazz singer

== H ==
- Emily Haines – singer-songwriter (also member of Metric, Emily Haines and the Soft Skeleton and Broken Social Scene)
- Nate Haller – country singer-songwriter
- Marc-André Hamelin – classical pianist and composer
- Mark Hamilton – frontman of Woodpigeon
- Moshe Hammer – violinist
- Marie-Lynn Hammond – folk singer
- Handsome Ned – country singer
- Gerry Hannah – bass player of Subhumans
- Barbara Hannigan – soprano, conductor
- Lynne Hanson – singer-songwriter
- Buster Harding – jazz pianist, composer, arranger
- Hagood Hardy – jazz vibraphonist, pianist, known for "The Homecoming"
- Georgia Harmer – singer-songwriter
- Sarah Harmer – singer-songwriter
- Neil Harnett – blues-rock singer-songwriter
- Ofra Harnoy – cellist
- Barry Harris – dance music DJ, remixer, musician
- Chris Harris – multi-instrumentalist
- Harrison – electronic musician
- Robin Harrison – pianist, composer
- Corey Hart – singer
- Joshua Haulli – singer-songwriter
- Ron Hawkins – singer-songwriter
- Ronnie Hawkins – American-born singer, naturalized Canadian
- Richie Hawtin – techno musician-DJ, producer
- Hayden – singer-songwriter, real name Paul Hayden Desser
- Oliver Haze – singer-songwriter
- Terra Hazelton – jazz singer
- Jeff Healey – guitarist, trumpet player, singer
- Kevin Hearn – singer-songwriter (Barenaked Ladies)
- Tim Hecker – ambient/electronic musician
- Coleman Hell – indie pop/electronic musician
- Thomas Hellman – jazz/pop singer
- Scott Helman – singer-songwriter
- Wade Hemsworth – folk singer-songwriter
- Bill Henderson – singer-songwriter (Chilliwack)
- Sheila Henig – pianist, soprano
- Carl Henry – R&B, reggae musician
- Darcy Hepner – saxophonist, composer/arranger
- Ben Heppner – operatic tenor
- Mikey Heppner – guitarist, singer-songwriter (Priestess)
- Angela Hewitt – pianist
- Tim Hicks – country singer-songwriter
- Jolene Higgins – folk and acoustic blues singer-songwriter known as "Little Miss Higgins"
- Rebekah Higgs – singer-songwriter
- Dan Hill – pop singer
- Warren Hill – smooth jazz musician
- Veda Hille – singer-songwriter
- Florian Hoefner – jazz pianist
- Jacob Hoggard – singer (Hedley)
- Frannie Holder – singer, composer
- Steve Holt – pianist, singer-songwriter
- Matt Holubowski – singer-songwriter
- Amy Honey – singer-songwriter
- Jason Hook – guitarist
- Chris Hooper – drummer
- Tom Hooper – singer-songwriter
- Charlie Hope – children's musician
- Kelly Hoppe – harmonica player, multi-instrumentalist (Big Sugar)
- Paul Horn – flute player
- Luke Hoskin – guitar player (Protest the Hero)
- Gregory Hoskins – singer-songwriter
- Stuart Howe – operatic tenor
- Andrew Huang – musician
- Andrew Huculiak – drummer (We Are the City)
- Garth Hudson – multi-instrumentalist (the Band)
- Paul Humphrey – singer-songwriter (Blue Peter)
- Alex Zhang Hungtai – indie rock singer-songwriter, performing as Dirty Beaches
- Jimmy Hunt – singer-songwriter
- Tommy Hunter – singer who had his own CBC TV show
- Nate Husser – rapper
- Timothy Hutchins – flute player
- Andrew Hyatt – country singer
- Paul Hyde – singer-songwriter (Payola$)
- Ron Hynes – Newfoundland folk singer-songwriter
- Hyper-T – rapper
- Joshua Hyslop – singer-songwriter

== I ==
- Zaki Ibrahim – soul, R&B singer
- Norman Iceberg – pop singer
- Lucie Idlout – rock singer
- Ill-esha – electronic, R&B vocalist, producer, songwriter
- Joshua Ingram – rock drummer, percussionist
- Chin Injeti – R&B singer
- May Irwin – vaudeville singer
- Elisapie Isaac – singer-songwriter
- Orin Isaacs – bandleader, bass guitarist
- Brandon Isaak – blues singer and guitarist
- iskwē – pop, electronic music singer

== J ==
- Lenni Jabour – pop singer-songwriter
- Susan Jacks – pop singer-songwriter
- Terry Jacks – pop singer-songwriter, producer
- Sammy Jackson – jazz and rhythm and blues singer
- Jacynthe – pop singer
- Emmanuel Jal – hip hop musician
- Colin James – blues and rock musician
- Freddie James – R&B singer
- John James – dance musician
- Ryland James – pop singer
- Reid Jamieson – pop and folk singer-songwriter (Vinyl Cafe)
- Patti Jannetta – pop and rock singer
- Paul Janz – singer-songwriter
- Sterling Jarvis – R&B singer, musical theatre actor
- Yves Jarvis – indie rock singer-songwriter
- JayWood – indie funk-rock singer and songwriter
- JBM (Jesse Marchant) – singer-songwriter
- Anik Jean – rock and pop singer
- Jelleestone – rapper
- Jemeni – hip-hop, R&B singer
- Drake Jensen – country singer
- Ingrid Jensen – jazz trumpet player
- Jeon So-mi – singer-songwriter, former member of I.O.I
- Carly Rae Jepsen – singer-songwriter
- Jhyve – rhythm and blues singer
- Berk Jodoin – folk/country singer-songwriter
- Mendelson Joe
- Lyndon John X – reggae musician
- Rita Johns – pop singer
- Alexz Johnson – singer-songwriter, actress
- Bill Johnson – blues and roots music performer
- Carolyn Dawn Johnson – country singer-songwriter
- Gordie Johnson – guitar player and singer (Big Sugar)
- Martha Johnson – singer-songwriter (Martha and the Muffins)
- Molly Johnson – rock and jazz singer
- Rick Johnson – rock guitarist, children's entertainer
- Taborah Johnson (Tabby Johnson) – jazz and rock singer
- France Joli – disco singer
- Danko Jones – singer-songwriter
- G.B. Jones – guitarist, drummer (Fifth Column)
- Jeff Jones – rock bassist, singer
- Miles Jones – rapper, singer-songwriter, producer
- Oliver Jones – jazz pianist
- Jorane – cellist, singer-songwriter
- Keven Jordan – pop/rock singer-songwriter
- Marc Jordan – singer-songwriter
- Sass Jordan – rock singer, judge on Canadian Idol
- Michelle Josef – drummer
- Leila Bronia Josefowicz – violinist
- Martha Joy – singer
- Junia-T – rapper
- Juurini – singer-songwriter

== K ==
- Florence K – pop singer-songwriter
- K-Anthony – gospel singer
- K-Bust – singer-songwriter
- Todd Kerns – vocalist/bassist (Slash, Age of Electric)
- Michael Kaeshammer
- Connie Kaldor – singer-songwriter, poet
- Kamau – hip-hop musician
- Kevin Kane – singer-songwriter
- Kanen – singer-songwriter
- KAPRI – dance/pop singer
- Kardinal Offishall – rapper
- Kaia Kater – singer-songwriter
- Cevin Key – songwriter, producer, and composer
- Ethan Kath – producer (Crystal Castles)
- Kathleen – Quebec pop singer
- Katie B – singer-songwriter (formerly with Jakalope)
- John Kay – singer (Steppenwolf)
- Kaya – rock and pop singer, formerly known as Francis Martin
- Kaytranada – electronic
- Sherry Kean
- James Keelaghan – singer-songwriter
- Jesse F. Keeler – Death from Above 1979, MSTRKRFT
- Greg Keelor – singer-songwriter, guitarist (Blue Rodeo, solo artist)
- Simeonie Keenainak – accordionist
- Joey Keithley – also known as Joey Shithead, Vancouver punk rock singer, guitarist (D.O.A.), political and environmental activist
- Geoffrey Kelly – Celtic-folk musician, singer (Spirit of the West, the Paperboys)
- Jadea Kelly - singer-songwriter
- Mia Kelly - singer-songwriter
- Sean Kelly – singer, guitarist (Crash Kelly)
- Roy Kenner – singer-songwriter
- Mo Kenney – singer-songwriter
- Lydia Képinski – singer-songwriter
- Cassius Khan – ghazal player, tabla player, Indian classical musician
- Khotin – house, downtempo electronic musician
- Rich Kidd – hip hop artist
- Brett Kissel – country singer
- Kid Koala – hip-hop artist
- Kiesza (Kiesa Rae Ellestad) – singer-songwriter
- Andy Kim – singer-songwriter, pop musician ("Sugar, Sugar")
- Kiva – harmonic overtone singer, keyboardist, worldbeat/jazz artist
- Bryden Gwiss Kiwenzie – dance music
- Francois Klark – pop singer-songwriter
- Trish Klein – folk music guitarist, singer-songwriter (the Be Good Tanyas)
- Billy Klippert – rock musician
- K.Maro – R&B, rap musician, producer
- K'naan – rapper
- Aidan Knight – singer-songwriter
- Chester Knight – singer-songwriter
- Moe Koffman – jazz artist
- Gwendolyn Koldofsky – piano accompanist and music educator
- Ron Korb – composer, flutist
- Koriass – rapper
- k-os – rapper, hip-hop musician
- Keith Kouna – punk rock singer
- Benjamin Kowalewicz – frontman of Billy Talent
- Dan and Ryan Kowarsky – singers (RyanDan and b4-4)
- Nik Kozub – bassist (Veal), keyboardist (Shout Out Out Out Out), remixer (the Paronomasiac)
- Serouj Kradjian – pianist, composer
- Norbert Kraft – guitarist
- Diana Krall – jazz singer, pianist
- Chantal Kreviazuk – singer-songwriter
- Nicholas Krgovich – indie rock, pop singer-songwriter
- David Kristian – film composer, electronic musician
- Kyrie Kristmanson – singer-songwriter
- Chad Kroeger – singer, guitarist, Nickelback
- Patricia Krueger – classical pianist with the Toronto Symphony Orchestra
- Spencer Krug – singer-songwriter (Fifths of Seven, Frog Eyes, Wolf Parade, Sunset Rubdown, Swan Lake)
- Pierre Kwenders – pop/world music singer, rapper
- Kyprios – hip-hop musician

== L ==
- Jesse Labelle – country singer country singer
- James LaBrie – singer-songwriter, Dream Theater
- Kathryn Ladano – bass clarinetist
- Elise LeGrow – singer-songwriter
- James LaBrie – singer-songwriter (Dream Theater)
- Kathryn Ladano – bass clarinetist
- Paul Laine – singer (solo, Danger Danger)
- Corky Laing – drummer
- Jon Lajoie – comedian, actor, rapper, singer, musician, Internet celebrity
- Mary Jane Lamond – Gaelic singer
- Willie Lamothe – country singer
- Wendy Lands – pop and jazz singer
- Tory Lanez – R&B
- k.d. lang – country punk singer
- Matt Lang – country singer
- Steve Lang – bassist (April Wine, Mashmakhan)
- Robert Langevin – flute player
- Daniel Lanois – composer, producer
- Jessy Lanza – electronic musician
- Abigail Lapell – folk singer-songwriter
- André Laplante – pianist
- Eric Lapointe – rock singer
- Pierre Lapointe – pop, rock, funk singer-songwriter
- Steph La Rochelle – country/pop singer-songwriter, musical theatre actress
- Thierry Larose – rock singer-songwriter
- Bells Larsen – singer-songwriter
- Grit Laskin – folk singer, luthier
- Henry Lau – violinist, singer, dancer (Super Junior-M)
- Michael Laucke – classical and flamenco guitarist, composer, producer
- Carole Laure – pop/folk singer
- Laurence-Anne – pop singer
- Sherisse Laurence – country/pop singer, musical theatre actress
- Wayne Lavallee – singer-songwriter, film, television and theatre composer
- Avril Lavigne – singer-songwriter, musician, record producer
- Charles Lavoie – singer, composer
- Daniel Lavoie – singer-songwriter
- Barbara Law – pop and rock singer
- Grant Lawrence – rock singer, radio personality
- Marshall Lawrence – blues, rock
- Dorothy Lawson – cellist, composer (ETHEL)
- Lisa LeBlanc – singer-songwriter, banjoist
- Félix Leclerc – singer-songwriter
- Salomé Leclerc – singer-songwriter
- Catherine Leduc – singer-songwriter
- Daniel Ledwell – singer-songwriter, record producer, keyboardist (In-Flight Safety)
- Geddy Lee – singer, bassist, keyboardist (Rush)
- Jess Lee – country singer-songwriter
- Mark Lee – rapper, dancer of NCT, NCT 127, and SuperM, NCT Dream
- Lee Kum-Sing – classical pianist
- Ranee Lee – jazz singer, drummer, tenor saxophonist
- Sook-Yin Lee – rock singer-songwriter, broadcaster
- Sebastien Lefebvre – guitarist, singer (Simple Plan)
- Vincent Legault – instrumentalist, composer
- Ray Legere – bluegrass mandolinist and fiddler
- Elise LeGrow – singer-songwriter
- Peter Leitch – jazz guitarist
- Jean Leloup – singer-songwriter
- Lynda Lemay – singer-songwriter
- Michel Lemieux – experimental electronic music, performance art
- Hubert Lenoir – rock singer
- Martin Léon – singer-songwriter, composer
- Exco Levi – reggae singer
- Mike Levine – bassist and keyboardist
- Andrea Lewis – singer
- Glenn Lewis – R&B singer
- Jacob Lewis – pop/rock singer
- Larnell Lewis – drummer
- Neil Leyton – rock singer and guitarist
- David Lickley – singer-songwriter
- Alex Lifeson – guitarist (Rush)
- Murray Lightburn – indie-rock singer-songwriter, guitarist
- Gordon Lightfoot – singer-songwriter (voted Canada's favourite singer-songwriter)
- Terra Lightfoot – singer-songwriter
- LIGHTS – singer-songwriter
- Andrea Lindsay – singer-songwriter
- Aaron Lines – country musician
- Bruce Liu – pianist
- Liu Fang – pipa player
- Brianna Lizotte – fiddler
- Guy Lombardo – big band leader
- Celine Lomez – pop singer
- Rich London – rapper
- Morley Loon – singer-songwriter
- Loony – R&B singer
- Oscar Lopez – Latin-folk guitarist
- Myrna Lorrie – country singer-songwriter ("first lady of Canadian country music")
- Louis Lortie – pianist
- Loud – rapper
- Russell Louder – pop singer, performance artist
- Alexina Louie – pianist
- Wyatt C. Louis – singer-songwriter
- Night Lovell – hip hop musician/rapper, songwriter
- Johnnie Lovesin – rock singer
- Lowell – electropop singer-songwriter
- Larissa Loyva – singer-songwriter
- Luba – pop singer
- Lederhosen Lucil – singer-songwriter
- Zachary Lucky – singer-songwriter
- Chris "Old Man" Luedecke – folk singer-songwriter
- Todd Lumley – pianist, keyboardist
- Sekou Lumumba – drummer
- Corb Lund – country singer-songwriter
- Rob Lutes – folk/blues singer-songwriter
- Loma Lyns – country singer
- Lysandre – pop singer-songwriter and pianist

== M ==
- Amanda Mabro – singer-songwriter
- Mark Masri – tenor singer/gospel composer
- Galt MacDermot – composer, musician, wrote the music for Hair
- Colin MacDonald – singer, guitarist (the Trews)
- Sarah MacDonald – conductor and organist
- John-Angus MacDonald – guitarist (the Trews)
- Maggie MacDonald – singer, keyboardist (the Hidden Cameras, Kids on TV)
- Tom MacDonald – Independent rapper
- Kris MacFarlane – independent drummer/multi-instrumentalist (Great Big Sea, the Paperboys)
- Ryan MacGrath – singer-songwriter
- Ashley MacIsaac – violinist
- Gisele MacKenzie – singer, violinist
- Jon McKiel – rock singer-songwriter
- Tara MacLean – singer-songwriter
- Catherine MacLellan – singer-songwriter
- Gene MacLellan – singer-songwriter
- Brian Macleod – songwriter, music producer (best known as a member of Chilliwack and the Headpins)
- Buddy MacMaster – violinist
- Natalie MacMaster – violinist, stepdancer
- Kevin MacMichael – guitarist (Cutting Crew)
- Rita MacNeil – country and folk singer
- Rozalind MacPhail – singer-songwriter, multi-instrumentalist
- Mad Child – rapper
- Madagascar Slim – folk and blues guitarist
- Ria Mae – singer-songwriter
- Maestro Fresh Wes – hip-hop musician, singer of "Let Your Backbone Slide"
- Matt Maher – contemporary Christian singer
- Raine Maida – singer (Our Lady Peace)-songwriter, producer
- Phyllis Mailing – mezzo-soprano
- Catherine Major – singer-songwriter
- Charlie Major – singer-songwriter
- Kate Maki – country rock singer-songwriter
- Ryan Malcolm – lead singer (Low Level Flight), first Canadian Idol winner
- Manafest – hip-hop musician
- Dan Mangan – singer-songwriter
- Casey Manierka-Quaile (Casey MQ) – electronic musician, songwriter, producer
- John Mann – rock singer (Spirit of the West)
- Dayna Manning – singer-songwriter
- Catherine Manoukian – violinist
- Richard Manuel – pianist, vocalist, drummer (the Band)
- Richard Margison – operatic tenor
- Kristina Maria – pop singer-songwriter
- Marie-Mai – singer
- Frank Marino – guitarist, singer (Mahogany Rush)
- Carolyn Mark – alt-country singer-songwriter
- Gerry Markman – rock guitarist (the Lincolns)
- Cory Marks – country rock singer-songwriter and guitarist
- Hugh Marsh – violinist
- Amanda Marshall – singer-songwriter
- Lois Marshall – soprano
- Béatrice Martin – singer-songwriter, pianist, also known as Cœur de pirate
- Jeff Martin – singer-songwriter (the Tea Party)
- Stephanie Martin – singer-songwriter, actress
- Mia Martina – pop singer-songwriter
- Masia One – rapper
- Dutch Mason – blues artist
- Jojo Mason – country singer-songwriter
- Massari – R&B singer
- Ken Masters – rapper
- Andrew Matheson – punk rock singer and songwriter
- Jake Mathews – country singer-songwriter
- André Mathieu – pianist and composer
- Matiu – singer-songwriter
- Kalle Mattson – folk rock singer-songwriter
- Romi Mayes – country singer
- Matt Mays – singer-songwriter
- Bill McBirnie – jazz/Latin flutist (Extreme Flute)
- Maxwell McCabe-Lokos – keyboardist (the Deadly Snakes)
- Séan McCann – singer-songwriter, guitarist (Great Big Sea)
- Jay McCarrol – composer
- Melissa McClelland – singer-songwriter
- Jeremiah McDade – composer, saxophonist, Irish whistle (the McDadea)
- Solon McDade – composer, bassist (the McDades)
- Eileen McGann – folk singer-songwriter
- Anna McGarrigle – folk singer-songwriter (Kate & Anna McGarrigle)
- Kate McGarrigle – folk singer-songwriter (Kate & Anna McGarrigle)
- Jay W. McGee – soul, R&B and hip hop singer/rapper
- Wayne McGhie – soul, R&B, reggae singer
- Blake McGrath – pop singer
- Eamon McGrath – singer-songwriter
- Kyle McKearney – alternative country singer-songwriter
- Mike McKenna – rock/blues guitarist noted for his electric slide playing
- Loreena McKennitt – Celtic-inspired musician, vocalist
- Chris McKhool – violinist, guitarist, singer (Sultans of String)
- Sarah McLachlan – singer-songwriter
- Murray McLauchlan – singer-songwriter
- Ambre McLean – singer-songwriter, multi-instrumentalist
- Kelly McMichael – singer-songwriter
- Holly McNarland – singer-songwriter
- Suzie McNeil – pop rock singer-songwriter
- Trevor McNevan – singer-songwriter (Thousand Foot Krutch, FM Static)
- Colin McPhee – classical composer, musicologist
- Linda McRae – singer-songwriter (Spirit of the West, solo artist)
- Tate McRae – singer-songwriter
- Glen Meadmore – punk/rock musician
- Michie Mee – rapper
- Tom Meikle – singer-songwriter who records as Mappe Of and Forest Moon
- Brian Melo – singer (winner of Canadian Idol, 2007)
- Shawn Mendes – singer-songwriter, guitarist
- Dylan Menzie – singer-songwriter
- Jerry Mercer – drummer, vocalist (April Wine, Mashmakhan, the Wackers)
- Madeline Merlo – country singer-songwriter
- Kathleen Ivaluarjuk Merritt – Inuk throat singer
- Scott Merritt – singer-songwriter
- Don Messer – fiddler
- Patrice Michaud – singer-songwriter
- Danny Michel – singer-songwriter, guitarist
- Anthony J. Mifsud (Mif) – singer-songwriter (Slash Puppet)
- Brandon Mig – pop singer
- Haviah Mighty – rapper
- Lynn Miles – singer-songwriter
- Amy Millan – singer-songwriter (Stars, Broken Social Scene)
- Tim Millar – rhythm guitar player (Protest the Hero)
- Muriel Millard – singer-songwriter
- Derek Miller – blues singer-songwriter, guitarist
- Darby Mills – singer (the Headpins)
- Frank Mills – pianist
- Tyler Joe Miller – country music singer-songwriter
- Millimetrik – electronic musician
- Kenneth G. Mills – pianist, conductor, composer
- Andy Milne – jazz pianist
- Matt Minglewood – singer-songwriter, guitarist
- Ben Mink – guitarist, violinist (k.d. lang, Geddy Lee, Rush, FM)
- Ruth Minnikin – singer-songwriter
- Joni Mitchell – folk and jazz artist, painter
- Kim Mitchell – guitarist, singer-songwriter, radio personality
- Lindsay Mitchell – guitarist, songwriter (Prism)
- Taylor Mitchell – singer-songwriter
- Willy Mitchell – singer, guitarist
- Mitsou – pop singer
- Dave Moffatt – pop/rock keyboardist, singer
- Aviva Mongillo – singer, actress
- Monsune – electronic musician
- Montag – electronic musician
- Betty Moon – singer-songwriter
- Jacob Moon – singer-songwriter, guitarist
- Kevin Moon – singer, main vocalist (the Boyz)
- Darren Moore – member of Harlequin, founder of Living Under Venus, writer of themes for Tampa Bay Rays and Toronto Blue Jays
- Gil Moore – drummer, vocalist (Triumph)
- Katie Moore – singer-songwriter
- Mae Moore – singer-songwriter
- Rick Moranis – singer, actor
- Ryland Moranz – folk/roots singer-songwriter
- Carlos Morgan – R&B/soul singer
- Jeffrey Morgan – singer-songwriter, rock critic
- Alanis Morissette – rock singer
- Johannes Moser – cellist
- Jess Moskaluke – country pop singer
- Mr. Roam – rapper
- Geoffrey Moull – conductor, pianist
- Art Murphy – singer-songwriter
- Chris Murphy – power pop singer-songwriter, bassist (Sloan)
- Matt Murphy – singer-songwriter, guitarist (the Super Friendz, the Flashing Lights, The Life and Hard Times of Guy Terrifico)
- Anne Murray – country/pop singer
- Alannah Myles – rock singer
- David Myles – singer-songwriter
- Ken Myhr – guitarist, composer
- Men I Trust – indie band.

== N ==
- N Nao – dream-pop singer and songwriter
- Kaveh Nabatian – trumpeter
- Bif Naked – punk/pop singer
- Nardwuar the Human Serviette
- Nancy Nash – blues and pop singer
- Narcy – rapper
- Nash the Slash – multi-instrumental rock musician (FM)
- Kamila Nasr – singer, composer and multi-instrumentalist
- Nav – rapper
- Haydain Neale – soul, R&B, jazz singer-songwriter
- Nemahsis – pop singer
- Laurence Nerbonne – pop singer
- Richard Newell – also known as King Biscuit Boy, blues singer, songwriter, band leader and harmonica player
- Carl Newman – guitarist, songwriter (the New Pornographers)
- Billy Newton-Davis – R&B, jazz, gospel singer-songwriter
- Yannick Nézet-Séguin – conductor
- Luke Nicholson – singer-songwriter
- Larry Nickel – composer
- Dave Nicol – folk singer-songwriter
- Chris Nielsen – country singer
- Eliza Niemi – singer-songwriter, cellist
- Laura Niquay – singer-songwriter
- Noah23 – rapper
- Graph Nobel – hip-hop artist, R&B rapper, singer-songwriter
- Sierra Noble – singer-songwriter, fiddler
- Bob Nolan – country singer-songwriter (the Sons of the Pioneers)
- Faith Nolan – jazz singer-songwriter, guitarist
- Safia Nolin – singer-songwriter
- Craig Norris – rock singer, radio personality
- Craig Northey – rock singer (Odds)
- Aldo Nova – rock/pop artist
- George Nozuka – singer
- Justin Nozuka – singer, writer
- Nyssa – singer-songwriter

== O ==
- OBUXUM – record producer
- Patricia O'Callaghan – singer
- Michael Occhipinti – jazz guitarist
- Roberto Occhipinti – jazz/classical bassist
- Ryan Ofei – gospel singer
- Nivek Ogre – industrial rock singer
- Maggie Blue O'Hara – singer, actress, voice artist
- Mary Margaret O'Hara – pop/rock singer-songwriter
- Jenny Omnichord – indie pop singer-songwriter
- Melissa O'Neil – pop singer (winner of Canadian Idol, 2005)
- Mike O'Neill – singer-songwriter and guitarist (the Inbreds)
- Moka Only – rapper
- Maren Ord – pop singer
- Johnny Orlando – pop singer
- John Orpheus – rapper, singer
- Achilla Orru – lukembé player
- Lindi Ortega – singer-songwriter
- Walter Ostanek – polka musician, accordionist
- John Oswald – composer
- Robyn Ottolini – country singer-songwriter
- Karim Ouellet – pop singer-songwriter
- Peter Oundjian – violinist, conductor
- Ouri – electronic-classical fusion composer

== P ==
- Dorothea Paas – singer-songwriter
- Steven Page – singer-songwriter (formerly with the Barenaked Ladies)
- Michel Pagliaro – bilingual singer, songwriter, guitarist
- Doug Paisley – singer-songwriter
- Owen Pallett – indie pop singer, violinist (Final Fantasy)
- Bruce Palmer – bassist (Buffalo Springfield)
- Alex Pangman – jazz singer
- Charlie Panigoniak – Inuk singer-songwriter, guitarist
- Gabrielle Papillon – singer-songwriter
- Parichay – Bollywood/ Hip Hop/ R&B and Pop music producer and artist
- Sarina Paris – techno singer
- Jon Kimura Parker – classical pianist
- Kathleen Parlow – classical violinist
- Evalyn Parry – folk singer-songwriter
- Mark Parry – guitarist
- Samantha Parton – folk music multi-instrumentalist singer-songwriter (the Be Good Tanyas)
- PartyNextDoor – rapper
- Blaise Pascal – singer-songwriter
- Meghan Patrick – country singer
- Shan Vincent de Paul – pop/electronic/hip hop singer
- Nico Paulo – singer-songwriter
- Trevor W. Payne – gospel and R&B singer, composer
- Matt Paxton – singer-songwriter
- Peaches – electroclash/dance punk singer-songwriter, multi-instrumentalist
- Ryan Peake – guitarist (Nickelback)
- Neil Peart – drummer, percussionist, lyricist (Rush)
- Orville Peck – country musician
- Klô Pelgag – pop singer-songwriter
- Bruno Pelletier – singer-songwriter
- Fred Pellerin – folk singer
- Fred Penner – children's music performer
- Patrick Pentland – power pop singer-songwriter, guitarist (Sloan)
- Yann Perreau – electro-rock musician
- Anjulie Persaud – singer-songwriter
- Colleen Peterson – country singer-songwriter
- Oscar Peterson – jazz pianist
- Billy Pettinger – singer-songwriter
- Lou Phelps – rapper
- Philémon Cimon – singer-songwriter
- Stu Phillips – country singer
- Pascale Picard – singer
- Scott-Pien Picard – singer-songwriter
- Paul Piché – singer
- Jason Pierce – drummer (Our Lady Peace)
- Lido Pimienta – electronic pop singer and producer
- Grenville Pinto – violinist, recording artist, entertainer and composer
- Nestor Pistor – country singer/comedy musician
- Louise Pitre – musical theatre actor
- Dany Placard – singer-songwriter
- Dominique Plante – guitarist, composer
- Bill Plaskett – folk/rock/jazz musician
- Joel Plaskett – alternative rock musician
- Jason Plumb – singer-songwriter
- Poizunus – DJ, human beatbox
- Steve Poltz – singer-songwriter (known for collaboration with Jewel)
- poolblood – indie pop singer-songwriter
- Carole Pope – new wave rock/pop singer
- Kalan Porter – singer-songwriter (winner of Canadian Idol, 2004)
- Shelley Posen – folklorist, songwriter
- Catherine Potter – bansuri
- Roxanne Potvin – blues singer-songwriter
- Blake Pouliot – violinist
- Tom Power – folk musician
- Daniel Powter – singer-songwriter
- Pressa – rapper
- Chad Price – singer-songwriter
- Garth Prince – children's entertainer
- William Prince – singer-songwriter
- Peter Pringle – pop and jazz singer, pianist, theremin player
- Promise – hip-hop rapper, singer-songwriter
- ThePropheC – singer-songwriter, producer
- P'tit Belliveau
- Adonis Puentes – jazz, world music
- Don Pyle – drummer (Shadowy Men on a Shadowy Planet, Fifth Column)

== Q ==
- Q052 – rapper
- Charlotte Angugaattiaq Qamaniq – Inuk throat singer
- Quanteisha – singer
- Sara Quin – singer-songwriter, producer (Tegan and Sara)
- Tegan Quin – singer-songwriter, producer (Tegan and Sara)

== R ==
- Raffi – folk/pop singer-songwriter
- Billy Raffoul – rock singer, songwriter
- Iceis Rain – pop/rock singer
- Ralph – singer-songwriter
- Alcvin Ramos – shakuhachi player (solo and ensemble)
- Josh Ramsay – singer-songwriter, guitarist, pianist Marianas Trench
- Jan Randall – film composer
- Luv Randhawa – bhangra singer
- Allan Rayman – rhythm and blues singer
- Corin Raymond – singer-songwriter
- Richard Raymond – pianist
- Savannah Ré – soul/rhythm and blues singer
- Lee Reed – rapper
- Josh Reichmann – singer-songwriter (Tangiers, Jewish Legend)
- Alyssa Reid – pop singer-songwriter
- Noah Reid – singer-songwriter
- Colleen Rennison – singer (No Sinner)
- Ginette Reno – singer
- Mike Reno – singer (Loverboy)
- Jessie Reyez – singer
- Donn Reynolds – yodeler; folk and country singer-songwriter
- Isabelle Rezazadeh – DJ and record producer (Rezz)
- Amanda Rheaume – folk singer-songwriter
- Kyle Riabko – singer, guitarist
- Alejandra Ribera – pop and jazz singer-songwriter
- Jackie Richardson – blues, jazz and gospel singer
- Sébastien Ricard – rapper (Loco Locass), actor
- Charles Richard-Hamelin – pianist
- Kim Richardson – pop, blues, jazz and gospel singer
- Julianna Riolino – singer-songwriter
- River Tiber – rhythm and blues musician
- Jesse Rivest – singer-songwriter
- Ian Robb – folk musician
- Vincent Roberge – indie-pop singer
- Robert Robert – pop/electronic singer and producer
- Brad Roberts – singer (Crash Test Dummies)
- Sam Roberts – rock musician
- Ed Robertson – singer-songwriter (Barenaked Ladies)
- Robbie Robertson – guitarist, singer (the Band)-songwriter
- Alex J. Robinson – country singer-songwriter
- Damien Robitaille – musician
- Bob Rock – singer-songwriter (Payola$), producer (Metallica)
- Andrew Rodriguez – singer-songwriter
- Garnet Rogers – singer-songwriter
- Kate Rogers – singer-songwriter
- Nathan Rogers – singer-songwriter
- Stan Rogers – folk musician
- Daniel Romano – folk, country and indie rock musician
- Don Ross – fingerstyle guitarist, musician, composer
- Josh Ross – country singer and songwriter
- Lukas Rossi – singer-songwriter, winner of Rockstar: Supernova
- Adolphe-Basile Routhier – lyricist of the original French version of the Canadian national anthem "O Canada"
- Ariane Roy – pop singer-songwriter
- Jonathan Roy – pop singer-songwriter
- Spookey Ruben – singer-songwriter
- Paul Rudolph – guitarist, singer-songwriter (Pink Fairies, Hawkwind, Brian Eno)
- Allison Russell – singer-songwriter, musician and activist
- Brenda Russell – singer-songwriter, keyboardist
- Justin Rutledge – alt-country singer-songwriter
- Deric Ruttan – country singer-songwriter
- Serena Ryder – folk/pop singer-songwriter

== S ==
- Shakura S'Aida – blues/jazz singer-songwriter
- Julien Sagot – percussionist, singer-songwriter
- Josh Sahunta – pop/R&B singer-songwriter
- Martine St-Clair – pop singer
- Jordan St Cyr – contemporary Christian singer
- Samian – rapper
- Gordie Sampson – blues, rock singer
- Lance "Aquakultre" Sampson – soul, R&B singer and rapper
- John K. Samson – indie rock singer and songwriter (the Weakerthans)
- Chase Sanborn – jazz trumpeter
- Curtis Santiago – dance rock singer-songwriter
- Ivana Santilli – R&B singer
- Sarahmée – rapper
- SATE – rock singer
- Saukrates – rapper
- Andrew Scott – power pop singer-songwriter, drummer (Sloan)
- Jack Scott – rock and roll singer
- Jay Scøtt – folk/hip hop singer-songwriter
- Jennifer Scott – jazz singer, pianist
- Keith Scott- rock guitarist (Bryan Adams band)
- Sea Oleena – indie folk singer-songwriter
- Joyce Seamone – country singer
- Lorraine Segato – singer-songwriter
- Jacques Kuba Séguin – jazz trumpeter
- Jay Semko – singer-songwriter, bassist
- Matthew Seok – singer, (Zerobaseone)
- Ron Sexsmith – singer-songwriter
- Mike Shabb – rapper
- Shad – rapper
- Paul Shaffer – musical director
- Remy Shand – R&B/soul singer
- Jackie Shane – R&B singer
- Jairus Sharif – experimental jazz saxophonist
- Andy Shauf – singer-songwriter
- Shauit – singer-songwriter
- Andrew Shaver – folk/country singer-songwriter
- Bernie Shaw – rock singer (Uriah Heep)
- Graham Shaw – rock singer, television composer
- James Shaw – guitarist (Metric)
- Tyler Shaw – singer-songwriter, cinematic composer
- Crystal Shawanda – country singer
- Shay Lia – singer
- Shiloh – pop singer-songwriter
- Shingoose – singer-songwriter
- Stefie Shock – pop and funk singer-songwriter
- Gabrielle Shonk – singer-songwriter
- Howard Shore – composer (The Lord of the Rings trilogy and films of David Cronenberg)
- Shotgun Jimmie – singer-songwriter
- Edythe Shuttleworth – mezzo-soprano
- Ali Siadat – drummer (Mother Mother)
- Rosemary Siemens – violinist, vocalist
- Jane Siberry – singer-songwriter
- Siibii – pop singer
- Lucas Silveira – rock singer, guitarist
- Liberty Silver – R&B singer
- Marie-Josée Simard – percussionist
- Nathalie Simard – pop singer
- René Simard – pop singer
- Denis Simpson – singer
- Shane Simpson – guitarist, singer-songwriter
- Dylan Sinclair – rhythm and blues singer
- Zal Sissokho – Kora) player, Griot
- Sister Ray – singer-songwriter
- Sixtoo – hip-hop DJ and MC
- Skiifall – rapper
- Ken Skinner – pianist/composer, record producer
- Amy Sky – singer-songwriter
- Slakah the Beatchild – soul and R&B singer, record producer
- Sarah Slean – singer-songwriter, pianist
- Alberta Slim – country music singer
- Tannis Slimmon – folk singer-songwriter
- Henry Small – singer-songwriter, radio personality
- Dallas Smith – rock/country singer-songwriter
- Laura Smith – folk singer
- Maybe Smith – indie pop singer-songwriter
- Meaghan Smith – singer
- R. Harlan Smith – country singer
- Samantha Savage Smith – singer-songwriter
- Dan Snaith – songwriter
- Floyd Sneed – rock drummer
- Bob Snider – folk singer-songwriter
- Jason Sniderman – keyboardist (Blue Peter)
- Snow – reggae/rap/pop musician
- Hank Snow – country and western singer
- So Sus – electronic musician
- Bryce Soderberg – bassist (Lifehouse)
- Viviana Sofronitsky – pianist
- Ana Sokolovic – composer
- Theresa Sokyrka – singer (Canadian Idol semi-finalist, 2004)
- Solitair – rapper
- Lenny Solomon – pop and jazz singer
- Maribeth Solomon – songwriter, composer
- Aaron Solowoniuk – drummer (Billy Talent)
- Harry Somers – composer
- SonReal – rapper
- Martina Sorbara – folk-pop singer
- Arielle Soucy – singer-songwriter
- Souldia – rapper
- Jay Sparrow – rock singer-songwriter
- Spek Won – rapper
- Kevin Spencer – multi-instrumentalist, songwriter, producer
- Spirit – guitarist and singer-songwriter
- Rae Spoon – folk/indie singer-songwriter
- Tony "Wild T" Springer – blues-rock guitarist
- Frederick Squire – rock singer, guitarist (Shotgun & Jaybird)
- Glen Stace – rock singer
- Leeroy Stagger – singer-songwriter
- Ethel Stark – violinist and conductor
- Erroll Starr – rhythm and blues singer
- Kinnie Starr – singer-songwriter
- Lucille Starr – singer
- Cassie Steele – singer-songwriter, actress
- Chrissy Steele – rock singer
- Emily Steinwall – singer, composer, saxophonist
- Katie Stelmanis – singer-songwriter
- Ian Stephens – punk rock musician
- Martin Stevens – disco singer
- Tyler Stewart – drummer
- Craig Stickland – singer-songwriter
- Jeff Stinco – singer-songwriter and rhythm-guitarist (Simple Plan)
- Georgina Stirling – singer
- Andy Stochansky – singer-songwriter, drummer (former drummer for Ani DiFranco)
- Kim Stockwood – singer
- Jayme Stone – banjoist, composer
- Miranda Stone – singer-songwriter
- Storry – pop, R&B singer-songwriter
- Charlie Storwick – singer-songwriter
- Amanda Stott – singer
- Jeffery Straker – singer-songwriter
- Byron Stroud – bassist (Strapping Young Lad, Fear Factory)
- Sukha – rapper
- Mark Sultan – singer-songwriter, Sultan Records founder
- Harold Sumberg – violinist
- Cree Summer – rock/alternative singer
- Richard Summerbell – singer-songwriter
- Leonard Sumner – singer-songwriter
- Terry Sumsion – country singer
- Michelle Sweeney – jazz singer
- Skye Sweetnam – singer-songwriter
- Gwen Swick – singer-songwriter
- Tomi Swick – singer-songwriter
- Ember Swift – singer-songwriter
- Kurt Swinghammer – singer-songwriter

== T ==
- Tablo – rapper (Epik High)
- Tanya Tagaq – Inuk throat singer, folk singer
- Talk – indie rock singer
- Tamia – R&B singer
- Theo Tams – singer-songwriter (winner of Canadian Idol, 2008)
- Eva Tanguay – vaudeville singer
- Chaim Tannenbaum – folk singer
- Tariq – singer-songwriter, radio personality
- Tasha the Amazon – rapper
- Bobby Taylor – R&B singer-songwriter
- Dione Taylor – jazz singer
- Julian Taylor – rock singer
- R. Dean Taylor – singer-songwriter, producer for Motown
- Lydia Taylor – rock singer
- Tim Taylor – country singer-songwriter
- Tebey – country singer-songwriter
- Mark Templeton – electro-acoustic musician
- The Tenors – vocal trio tenor musician operatic gospel pop
- Marie-Jo Thério – singer-songwriter
- David Thibault – singer
- David Clayton Thomas – singer (Blood, Sweat & Tears)
- Ian Thomas – singer-songwriter, actor, author
- T. Thomason – singer-songwriter
- Don Thompson – jazz musician
- Jamie Thompson – drummer, beat-maker
- Nicholas Thorburn – frontman for Islands
- Ian Thornley – singer-songwriter
- Willie Thrasher – Inuk singer-songwriter
- Thrust – rapper
- Georges Thurston – soul singer
- Martin Tielli – singer-songwriter (Rheostatics)
- Margo Timmins – singer (Cowboy Junkies)
- Tire le coyote – singer-songwriter
- Brent Titcomb – musician, actor
- Liam Titcomb – singer-songwriter
- Ken Tobias – singer-songwriter
- Maylee Todd – pop singer
- Yvette Tollar – jazz singer, composer
- Henri Tomasi – composer and conductor
- Töme – reggae singer
- Morgan Toney – folk singer-songwriter and fiddler
- Tor – electronic musician
- Marie-Chantal Toupin – Francophone pop singer
- Theresa Tova – musical theatre actress
- Tenille Townes – country singer-songwriter
- Devin Townsend – multi-instrumentalist, metal guitarist, songwriter
- Pete Traynor – rock guitarist and bassist, designer of Traynor Amplifiers
- Pat Travers – rock guitarist
- Tre Mission – rapper
- Lucie Blue Tremblay – folk singer-songwriter
- Domenic Troiano – guitarist
- Valerie Tryon – pianist
- Katie Tupper – singer-songwriter
- Andrina Turenne – folk singer-songwriter
- Ronald Turini – classical pianist
- Cynthia Johnston Turner – conductor
- Kreesha Turner – R&B singer
- Shania Twain – country/pop singer
- Jessica Tyler – singer-songwriter and actress
- Ian Tyson – folk singer
- Sylvia Tyson – singer-songwriter, guitarist

== U ==
- Dave Ullrich – drummer, singer (the Inbreds, Egger)
- Shari Ulrich – folk rock singer-songwriter
- Suzie Ungerleider – alternative country singer
- UpsideDown – DJ, producer
- David Usher – rock singer-songwriter (Moist)
- Terry Uyarak – singer-songwriter

== V ==
- Mathew V – pop singer
- Jake Vaadeland – country and bluegrass singer-songwriter
- Vaï – hip-hop singer
- Elizabeth Anka Vajagic – post-rock singer, guitarist
- Valdy – singer-songwriter
- Gilles Valiquette – rock singer, guitarist
- Jim Vallance – songwriter, multi-instrumentalist
- Rosie Valland – pop singer-songwriter
- Dom Vallie – rapper
- Diyet van Lieshout – singer-songwriter
- Randy Vancourt – pop singer-songwriter, theatre and TV composer
- Chad VanGaalen – singer-songwriter
- Vanity – singer, model
- Gino Vannelli – rock singer
- Chris Velan – pop and rock singer-songwriter
- Alx Veliz – singer-songwriter
- Stéphane Venne – songwriter and composer
- Reg Vermue – singer-songwriter ("Gentleman Reg")
- Tim Vesely – singer, guitarist (Rheostatics)
- Jon Vickers – operatic tenor
- Daniel Victor – rock musician (Neverending White Lights)
- Gilles Vigneault – singer-songwriter
- Annie Villeneuve – singer-songwriter
- Suzie Vinnick – folk and blues singer-songwriter, guitarist
- Laura Vinson – country singer-songwriter
- Jon Vinyl – R&B/soul singer
- Virginia to Vegas – singer-songwriter
- Claude Vivier – classical composer
- Roch Voisine – singer-songwriter
- Florent Vollant – aboriginal singer
- Leif Vollebekk – singer-songwriter
- Brian Vollmer – rock singer (Helix)
- Lindy Vopnfjörð – singer-songwriter

== W ==
- Martha Wainwright – folk-pop singer
- Rufus Wainwright – folk-pop singer
- Frank Walker – EDM DJ
- Rody Walker – singer (Protest the Hero)
- Colter Wall – folk singer
- Christopher Ward – songwriter
- Chris Wardman – songwriter, guitarist (Blue Peter)
- Andy Warren – singer-songwriter
- Jackie Washington – blues and folk singer-songwriter, guitarist
- Jeff Waters – guitarist and vocalist for heavy metal band Annihilator
- Ruby Waters – singer-songwriter
- Sneezy Waters – singer-songwriter
- Dawn Tyler Watson – blues singer
- Patrick Watson – singer-songwriter
- Andrée Watters – singer-songwriter
- The Weeknd – singer, songwriter, record producer, and actor born Abel Tesfaye
- John Welsman – composer, songwriter
- Zack Werner – artist, producer, entertainment lawyer, manager
- Daniel Wesley – singer-songwriter
- Wesli – world music guitarist
- Jim West – guitarist for "Weird Al" Yankovic
- Phil Western – drummer, programmer (Download)
- Dawud Wharnsby-Ali – singer-songwriter
- Deryck Whibley – singer-songwriter (Sum 41)
- Bill White – composer, choral group leader
- Nancy White – singer-songwriter, musical satirist
- Portia White – operatic contralto
- Rick White – singer-songwriter (Eric's Trip), guitarist
- Alissa White-Gluz – metal vocalist and songwriter (Arch Enemy, The Agonist)
- Jenny Whiteley – folk and country singer-songwriter
- Ken Whiteley – multi-instrumentalist, producer, composer
- Andrew Whiteman – singer-songwriter, guitarist (Broken Social Scene, Bourbon Tabernacle Choir, Apostle of Hustle)
- David Wiffen – folk singer-songwriter
- David Wilcox – blues guitarist, singer
- Richie Wilcox – singer
- Simon Wilcox – singer-songwriter (daughter of David Wilcox)
- JJ Wilde – rock singer
- Healey Willan – organist, composer
- Hal Willis – singer-songwriter
- Charlotte Day Wilson – singer-songwriter
- Tom Wilson – singer-songwriter
- Jesse Winchester – singer-songwriter
- Kurt Winter – guitarist, songwriter (the Guess Who)
- Bob Wiseman – pianist, songwriter
- Karl Wolf – R&B singer-songwriter
- Royal Wood – singer-songwriter
- Donovan Woods – singer-songwriter
- Roy Woods – singer-songwriter, rapper
- Hawksley Workman – singer-songwriter
- Michelle Wright – country singer-songwriter
- Kris Wu – rapper

== Y ==
- Tony Yike Yang – pianist
- Jonah Yano – indie pop singer-songwriter
- Nikki Yanovsky – singer
- Zal Yanovsky – guitarist, singer (the Lovin' Spoonful)
- Francesco Yates – singer-songwriter
- Ken Yates – folk singer-songwriter
- Lori Yates – country singer
- Kathleen Yearwood – singer-songwriter, guitarist
- d'bi Young – dub poet
- Young K – singer-songwriter, bass player Day6
- Neil Young – singer-songwriter, guitarist
- Catalina Yue – singer-songwriter

== Z ==
- Jordon Zadorozny – singer, producer
- La Zarra – singer
- Mary Lu Zahalan – rock singer
- Zaho – R&B singer
- Alfie Zappacosta – singer, actor
- Maurice Zbriger – violinist, composer, conductor
- Zeina – pop/R&B singer
- Liping Zhang – soprano
- Joel Zifkin – electric violinist, songwriter, composer
- Brock Zeman – producer, singer-songwriter, touring musician
- Gilles Zolty – singer-songwriter, composer, sound designer
- Jesse Zubot – violinist, composer

== See also ==
- List of bands from Canada
- List of diamond-certified albums in Canada
- List of Indigenous musicians in Canada
