= McDade =

McDade may refer to:

== People ==
- Alex McDade (1905–1937), Scottish anti-fascist and poet
- Aubrey McDade (born 1981), American marine
- Robert McDade (1922–2009), American army colonel
- Joseph M. McDade (1931-2017), American politician
- Lucinda A. McDade (born 1953), American botanist
- Patterson H. McDade (died 1877), American politician from North Carolina
- Wayne McDade (born 1981), New Zealand rugby player
- The McDades, a Canadian music ensemble
  - Jeremiah McDade
  - Solon McDade

== Fictional characters ==
- Victor McDade, a fictional character in Still Game
- McDade, a fictional character in the 1978 film Avalanche

== Places ==
- McDade Expressway, Pennsylvania
- McDade Park, Pennsylvania
- McDade, Alabama, an unincorporated community
- McDade, North Carolina, an unincorporated community, United States
- McDade, Texas, an unincorporated community, United States
  - McDade Independent School District
