= Maria Dunn =

Maria Dunn may refer to:

- Maria Dunn (wrestler)
- Maria Dunn (musician)
