= Spirit Cool =

Spirit
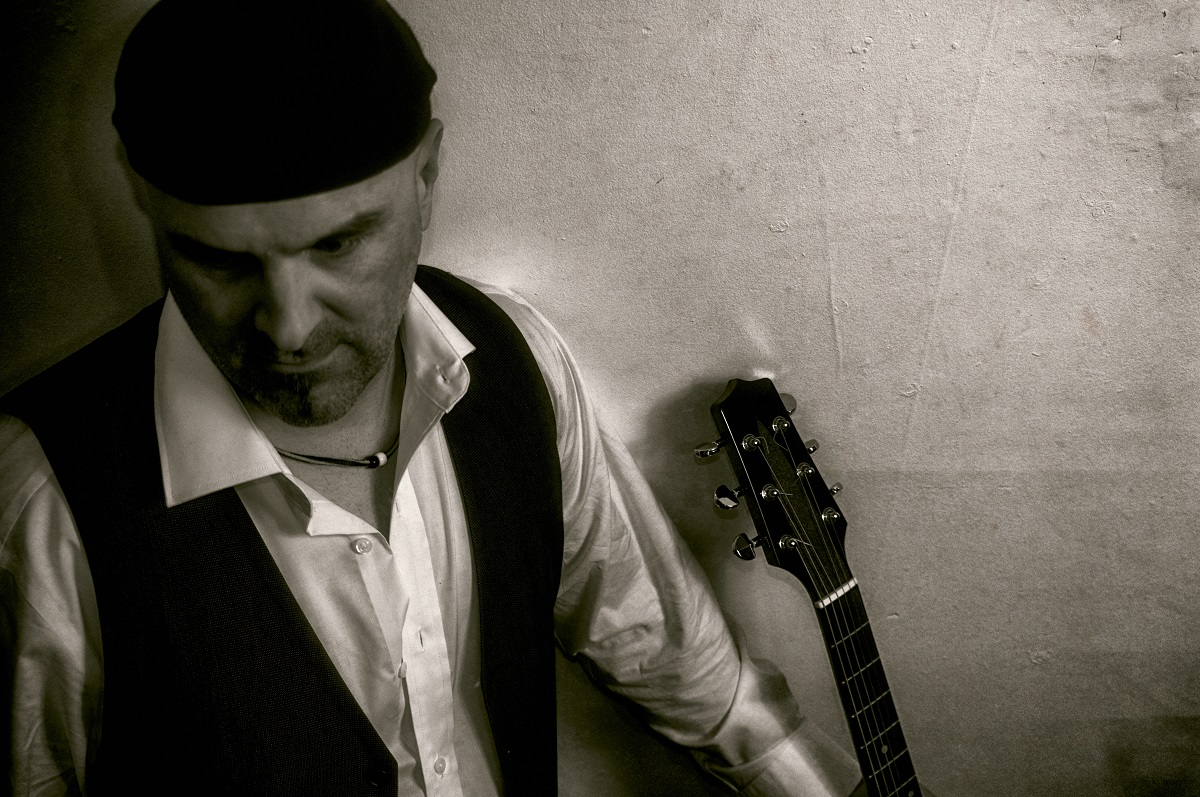
- Spirit

Background information
- Genres: Acoustic, Live looping, Rock
- Occupations: Singer, Guitarist, Looping artist
- Instrument: Guitar
- Years active: 2011–present
- Label: SpiritCool Entertainment
- Website: Official website

Spirit Cool popularly known as Spirit is a Canadian singer, songwriter, guitarist and acoustic live looping artist based in Vancouver, British Columbia. He is a former Guinness World Recordholder for longest marathon guitar playing.

He was placed in the "Top 20 Lower Mainland Best New Acts" in the 2013 CBC Music's Searchlight Contest, selected by public vote.

== Career ==
In the 1990s, he played in Poetic Justice, a Kitsilano based band. Later, he toured across Canada, the United States, the United Kingdom and Japan. He has performed with members from Trooper, Prism, Poetic Justice and other bands. He left his construction job to pursue his career in music in 2011, reportedly by Surrey Now.

In 2013, he released his debut album, All The Pieces, which was well received. He uses an acoustic live looping technique to perform original music with an acoustic guitar and his voice. Spirit released singles, Where, Oh Where in November 2017, followed by Give It All Back and Hands.

Spirit was placed in the "Top 20 Lower Mainland Best New Acts" in the 2013 CBC Music's Searchlight competition.

== World record ==
In May 2018, he entered in the Guinness Book of World's Records for longest marathon guitar playing. He played the guitar for 124.5 hours over six days, breaking the world record of 114 hours of guitar playing, which was previously held by David Browne from Ireland. Later in July 2018, Australian's Scott Burford broke Spirit's record by playing continuous guitar for over 125 hours.

== Philanthropy ==
In May 2018, he raised $10,000 funds for the Canadian Cancer Society by performing at the River Rock Casino Resort in memory of his parents, who both died of cancer.

== Discography ==
Year	Track	Artist(s)
2013	Come to Think of It	Spirit Cool
2013	Thief	Spirit Cool
2013	Nothing On Me	Spirit Cool
2013	No Goodbyes	Spirit Cool
2013	Leave Alone to Love	Spirit Cool
2013	Still Waters Run Deep	Spirit Cool
2013	Crosshaven	Spirit Cool
2013	Tornado	Spirit Cool
2013	Soul for Sale	Spirit Cool
2013	When It Rains	Spirit Cool
2017	Hands	Spirit Cool
2017	Where, Oh Where	Spirit Cool
2017	Give It All Back	Spirit Cool

== Albums list ==
Year	Albums's Name
2013	All the Pieces
2018	Hands

== See also ==
- List of Canadian musicians
