= Daisy DeBolt =

- Born: July 19, 1945; Winnipeg
- Died: October 4, 2011 (aged 66); Toronto
- Genres: folk
- Formerly of: Fraser & DeBolt

Donna Marie "Daisy" DeBolt (July 19, 1945 – October 4, 2011) was a Canadian singer, musician and songwriter. She was a member of the folk-singing duo Fraser & DeBolt.

== Life ==
The daughter of Marjorie DeBolt, a musician and music teacher, she was born in Winnipeg and took guitar lessons from Lenny Breau. DeBolt moved to Ontario in 1965 and began singing in coffee houses. In 1968, she met Allan Fraser at the Mariposa Folk Festival. The two became involved musically and personally. They recorded albums in 1971 and 1973 but broke up a few years later. She continued performing as a solo artist and wrote scores for films by the Canadian National Film Board and television. She also performed on CBC Radio and in various plays in theatres across Canada. DeBolt had a son with poet Robert Dickson. Besides folk, she also performed jazz, country, blues and reggae. She played mandolin, accordion and guitar.

DeBolt died of cancer in Toronto at the age of 66.
