= Allan Fraser (musician) =

Canadian folk musician and songwriter

- Born: 21 July 1948 (age 77); St. Stephen, New Brunswick, Canada
- Genres: Folk
- Years active: 1970 – present
- Labels: Columbia

Allan Hugh Fraser (born 21 July 1948 in St. Stephen, New Brunswick) is a Canadian folk musician and songwriter. During the late 1960s and early 1970s, he was part of Fraser & DeBolt (along with Daisy DeBolt), and released two albums with Columbia Records. Many artists have recorded his songs, including John Oates, The Duhks, Cassell Webb, Cal Hand with Leo Kottke, Tom Russell, and Penny Lang.

He lived in Montreal from 1994 with the artist Donna Louthood, until her death in 2011. He has three grown children: folk singer Kaya Fraser, Jade Fraser, and Simon Fraser.

== Discography ==
- Fraser & DeBolt With Ian Guenther (Columbia С 30381)
- Fraser & Debolt: With Pleasure (Columbia KC 32130)
- Fraser & DeBolt: This Song Was Borne (Roaratorio roar039)

== Sources ==
- Fraser and Debolt make their music and dodge the super-hype, Montreal Gazette 5 February 1972
- And Fraser stole the show, Village Voice, 11 February 1971
- Montreal composer-singers, Montreal Gazette, 20 September 1973
- New Rock: Pure as Spring Water, The New York Times, 18 April 1971
- Forget The Grammies Catch Fraser & Debolt, Montreal Gazette, 20 March 1971
- Artist's Biography, Al Whittle Theatre
