= Eva Everything =

- Genres: New wave
- Labels: Great Shakes Productions; Quality

Eva Everything is a Canadian musician, writer and television producer. Best known as an independent new wave music and video artist in the 1980s, she released her debut album Boob Tube in 1984, the No Pleasure EP in 1986, and The Right Thing on the In Demand compilation LP in 1987. She was one of Canada's first independent artists who wrote, performed, produced, manufactured and distributed their own music and videos. She is best known for her singles and videos including Painless, Boob Tube, and Polyester Passion. Her first music video Polyester Passion debuted on The All-Night Show hosted by Chuck the Security Guard in 1981. The video and song "No Pleasure" are featured in the 1987 motion picture The Gate. "No Pleasure" was nominated for Best Video by CFNY-FM's U-Know Awards in 1985.

In 1986 she began to write, produce, and direct television. Her credits include kid's science series Wonderstruck, It's Only Rock & Roll, Vid Kids and CBC Newsworld. In 1994, she was on the launch team of Discovery Channel Canada's daily science magazine show @discovery.ca, now known as Daily Planet. From 2001 to 2012, she produced and wrote the MindBender Quiz for Daily Planet. She has also written two all ages science quiz books for ECW Press, What Does the Moon Smell Like? and What Does the Earth Sound Like?.

== Discography ==
=== Albums ===
- 1984: Boob Tube
- 1991: Eva Everything: Soundtracks (cassette)
- 1991: Eva Everything: Greatest Hits (cassette)

=== Singles ===
- 1984: "Painless"
- 1989: "Piece of Cake: Soundtrack"
- 1985: "No Pleasure/Painless" [12"] (Quality)
