= Kathryn Ladano =

- Born: December 28
- Origin: Kitchener, Ontario, Canada
- Genres: Improvised music
- Occupation: Musician
- Instrument: Bass clarinet
- Years active: since 1990

Kathryn Ladano is a bass clarinet player from Kitchener, Ontario Canada. She has recorded four albums and has performed across Canada and internationally. Her first solo album, Open, was released in August 2010. She subsequently released the album "...listen" with her bass clarinet/percussion duo, Stealth, in 2015.

== History ==
She began playing the instrument while in high school at the age of 14, due to the lack of saxophones available. Unlike many bass clarinetists, she did not start by playing soprano clarinet. In fact she began playing that instrument several years later.

Kathryn studied under Mike Bergauer in high school, and then with Tilly Kooyman at the University of Waterloo. In 1999, she achieved an Honours Bachelor of Arts degree in Music at the University of Waterloo in Waterloo, Ontario before moving to Calgary, Alberta. She acquired a Master of Music degree in bass clarinet performance from the University of Calgary in 2003 where she studied with Stan Climie. She then received a Canada Council for the Arts grant which allowed her to study with bass clarinetist Lori Freedman in Montreal, Quebec. In 2005 she performed at the World Bass Clarinet Convention in Rotterdam, the Netherlands. She has performed at concerts in Vancouver, Toronto, Guelph, Waterloo and Calgary. She is known for her improvised performances.

Kathryn won the "Cook Homes Music Award" at the Waterloo Region Arts Award in 2016. She was also nominated in 2008 in the music category. She performed at the ceremony with pianist Jason White.

At the end of 2009, Kathryn was awarded a grant from the Region of Waterloo Arts Fund which allowed her to record her first solo album, Open, which was released in the summer of 2010. The album features numerous improvised works as well as the Star Trek tribute song "Evil Kirk". According to Ladano, "Evil Kirk" was inspired by the presence of bass clarinet on the original Star Trek series, particularly when a redshirt is about to die. Ladano is planning a Canadian tour in support of Open.

Currently Kathryn is the Artistic Director for New Music presenter/producer, NUMUS and works as a professor at Wilfrid Laurier University, teaching several courses in improvisation, including directing the Faculty of Music's "Improvisation Concerts Ensemble".

Kathryn Ladano is a Vandoren Canada Artist.

== Discography ==
=== Collaborations ===
- Wellington Winds – Tis the Season (1999)
- Wellington Winds – An Artists Neighbourhood (2002)
- Paul Haslem – Back to Basics (2008)
- Stealth - "...listen" (2015)

=== Solo ===
- Open (2010)
1. "Further Reflection" (Improvisation)
2. "Something I Can't Know" (Improvisation)
3. "The Down Low" (Improvisation)
4. "Open Strain"
5. "Artoxinovix"
6. "Art Show" (Improvisation)
7. "Ladano"
8. "The Taste of Time Still Lingers" (Infanzia E Scoperta, Ansia Sociale, Abbandonata, Rapporti, Sognare)
9. "Evil Kirk" (Featuring spoken word by Michael Ladano)
- Masked (2019)
1. "Flow"
2. "Outcry"
3. "Wings"
4. "Contentious"
5. "Exhale"
6. "Awaken"
7. "Groove"
8. "Blind"
9. "Expanse"
- Anatomy of the Recovering Brain (2024)
1. "Kathryn" (bass clarinet)
2. "Russ" (bass clarinet, vibraphone)
3. "Paul" (bass clarinet, cello)
4. "Melanie" (bass clarinet, piano)
5. "Lucy" (bass clarinet, piano, soprano)
6. "Jeffrey" (bass clarinet, soprano)
