= Catherine Potter =

Catherine Potter (December 25, 1957 – December 3, 2010) was a Canadian musician. She was considered to be Canada's master bansuri player.

The daughter of William Alexander Potter and Gwendolyn Dougherty, she was born in Guelph, Ontario with her twin sister Carole-Anne. The family, living in Windsor at the time, was visiting her maternal grandmother when the twins were born. Potter received a bachelor's degree in jazz studies from Concordia University and a master's degree in ethnomusicology from the Université de Montréal. She studied the bansuri in India with Pandit Hariprasad Chaurasia. She also studied with various musicians in Canada and India, including Boubacar Diabaté, Simon Shaheen, Ramasutra and Ganesh Anandan.

Potter released her first album Bansuri in 1997. In 2002, she founded the world music ensemble Duniya Project. The group released the album Duniya Project in 2006.

In 2008, she organized a concert tour of India, with stops in Canada and Europe. The Deccan Herald described her as "more Indian than any Indian".

Potter died in Montreal of bone cancer at the age of 52.
