= Jeremiah McDade =

Canadian folk musician (born 1977)

- Born: 1977 (age 48–49); Edmonton, Alberta, Canada
- Genres: Folk
- Occupation: Musician
- Instruments: Vocals, Irish whistle, saxophone, fiddle, flute
- Years active: 1982–present
- Website: www.themcdades.com

Jeremiah McDade is a Canadian folk musician.

== Career ==
McDade was a performer when he was five years old. With his parents, Terry and Danielle, brother, Solon and sister, Shannon Johnson he played in the McDade family band and performed a variety of shows in Canada. They have also performed for the British royal family. Jeremiah McDade is a graduate of McGill University and MacEwan University. Jeremiah McDade received a distinguished alumni award from MacEwan University, where he studied jazz. He, his brother Solon, and sister Shannon formed the McDades in 2000. Their second album, Bloom, received the Juno Award for best roots/traditional album by a group, an Independent Music Award, and two Canadian Folk Music Awards.

For nine years, McDade had a kidney disease which worsened until he could no longer work. In 2010, he received a successful kidney transplant from his cousin. McDade is now based out of Edmonton, Alberta, where he continues to perform and record with a variety of artists.

== Discography ==
With The McDades

- 2006 Bloom
- 2002 For Reel

With Terry McDade

- Harpe Danse (Free Radio, 1998)
- Midwinter (Free Radio, 2003)
- Noel (Free Radio, 2004)
- Winter Rose (Free Radio, 2011)

With Maria Dunn

- From Where I Stand
- For a Song
- We Were Good People
- The Peddler
- Piece By Piece
- Gathering

With Solon McDade

- Murals
