= Oliver Haze =

Canadian songwriter and performer

- Origin: Montreal, Quebec, Canada
- Occupations: Musician; songwriter; performer
- Years active: 2000s

Oliver Haze is a Canadian songwriter and performer, based in Montreal. He has shared the stage with the likes of Nelly Furtado, David Usher, The Tea Party, Big Sugar and many more. His hit single "Holy Water" reached number one on the BDS charts in Canada. He also made a cover of Duran Duran's "Save a Prayer", another song from his debut album, Wandering Trip (2001). Collaborators on his album included producers John Webster (who has worked with Aerosmith and Tom Cochrane), Terry Brown (Rush), and Al Sutton (Kid Rock).

== Charted songs in Canada ==
Sources:

- "My World Is You" (2000) – reached No. 2, 11 weeks in the charts
- "Holy Water" (2001) reached – No. 1, 15 weeks in the charts
- "Save a Prayer" (2001) – reached No. 14, 12 weeks in the charts
- tTop 10 in Europe charts – (Portugal, England, Germany...)
