= Tangiers (band) =

- Origin: Toronto, Ontario, Canada
- Genres: Indie rock
- Years active: 2003–2006
- Labels: Sonic Unyon, Frenchkiss Records
- Members: Josh Reichmann; James Sayce; Jon McCann; Shelton Deverell; Marco Moniz; Yuri Didrichsons

Tangiers was a Canadian indie rock band founded in 2003 and based in Toronto, Ontario.

== History ==
In 2003, Tangiers included drummer Marco Moniz, Josh Reichmann (vocals/guitars) and, fresh from The Deadly Snakes, James Sayce (vocals/bass), and guitarist Yuri Didrichsons.

In March 2003, the released their debut album Hot New Spirit, with the songs "Keep the Living Bodies Warm", "Return to the Ship", and "Ca Va Cool" pushing it to the top of the campus and community radio charts. In 2009, Maclean's magazine named Hot New Spirit one of the top-ten Canadian albums of the decade.

Despite radio success, widespread critical praise, and a reputation for being a high-energy party band, Tangier failed to capture live-audience attention, with a Spin Magazine reporter citing "booze-fueled performances" as a possible cause. In 2003, Moniz and Didrichsons left the band, due to personal conflicts. They were replaced by ex-Guided by Voices drummer Jon McCann and keyboardist Shelton Deverell.

In June 2004, the band released their second album, Never Bring You Pleasure. They toured Canada, and played a few shows in the US.

Tangiers' third album, The Family Myth was released in 2005, on Frenchkiss Records. It too received rave reviews, but the band broke up soon afterward. Sayce and McCann left Tangiers and moved to Holland, where they formed the band, Bishop Morocco. Reichmann formed the Josh Reichmann Oracle Band. Moniz moved to the band Bad Breed.

In 2013, Tangiers reunited to perform at Toronto's North by Northeast festival.

== Discography ==
- Hot New Spirits (2003, Sonic Unyon Records)
- Never Bring You Pleasure (2004, Sonic Unyon Records)
- The Family Myth (2005, Frenchkiss Records)
