= Solon McDade =

Canadian musician and composer (born 1974)

Solon McDade (born March 1974 in Edmonton, Alberta) is a Canadian musician and composer.

== Career ==
He began playing the cello at age four. By the time he was nine, he was playing double bass, washtub bass, and violin in the McDade Family Band. In his teens he performed at various Canadian folk festivals, the Commonwealth Games, and for the British royal family. He attended MacEwan University and studied jazz at McGill University where he received his Master's Degree in 2017. While a student, he toured with Bill Bourne, Maria Dunn, and his sister Shannon Johnson. He has received nominations by the Juno Awards and Aria Awards. He has worked with Luther "Guitar Junior" Johnson, Billy Boy Arnold, Wildchild Butler, Michael Coleman, Susie Arioli, and Jordan Officer.

He formed the McDades in 2000 with his sister Shannon Johnson and his brother, Jeremiah McDade. Their album Bloom (2007) was given the Juno Award for best roots/traditional album by a group. It also won an Independent Music Award and two Canadian Folk Music Awards. In 2018, he released his debut album, Murals.

== Discography ==
As leader

- Murals

With The McDades

- Bloom
- For Reel

With Terry McDade

- Harpe Danse
- Midwinter
- Noel

With Maria Dunn

- For a Song
- We Were Good People
- From Where I Stand
- The Peddler
- Gathering

With others

- Susie Arioli, Pennies from Heaven featuring Ralph Sutton
- Bill Bourne, Farmer, Philanthropist and Musician
- Bourne & Johnson, Victory Train
- Bob Jahrig, Treetops
- Jon McCaslin, McCallum's Island
- David Wilkie with The McDades, Cowboy Celtic
