= Josh Reichmann =

Canadian indie rock singer-songwriter

Josh Reichmann is a Canadian indie rock singer-songwriter and filmmaker.

== Musical career ==
Formerly associated with the band Tangiers, after that band's breakup he began performing under the stage name Jewish Legend. He released his debut album as Jewish Legend, Telepathy Now!, in 2006.

He went on to release the EP Life is Legal in 2008 as Josh Reichmann Oracle Band, and followed this with the full-length Crazy Power in 2009, both on the Paper Bag Records label.

In 2009, he covered Bat for Lashes' song "Daniel" for The Seven Year Itch, a Paper Bag Records cover compilation. In the same year, he and Sebastien Grainger of Death from Above 1979 released music together with the side project Bad Tits.

At the end of the 2000s, Tangiers's first album, Hot New Spirits, was named as one of the top 10 Canadian records of the decade by Maclean's.

Reichmann released the record After Live on Hand Drawn Dracula in 2011.

== Other endeavours ==
In 2011, Reichmann opened the clothing boutique Ruins with his partner Mikey Apples on Queen Street West in Toronto. The store featured clothes by Opening Ceremony, Patrek Ervell, Thomas and Assembly NYC and other international brands. Ruins closed in 2012, and Reichmann moved into other media projects including screenwriting and motion pictures.

His debut feature film Tenzin, co-directed with Michael LeBlanc, premiered in 2021 at the Tallinn Black Nights Film Festival prior to commercial release in 2022.
