= Luv Randhawa =

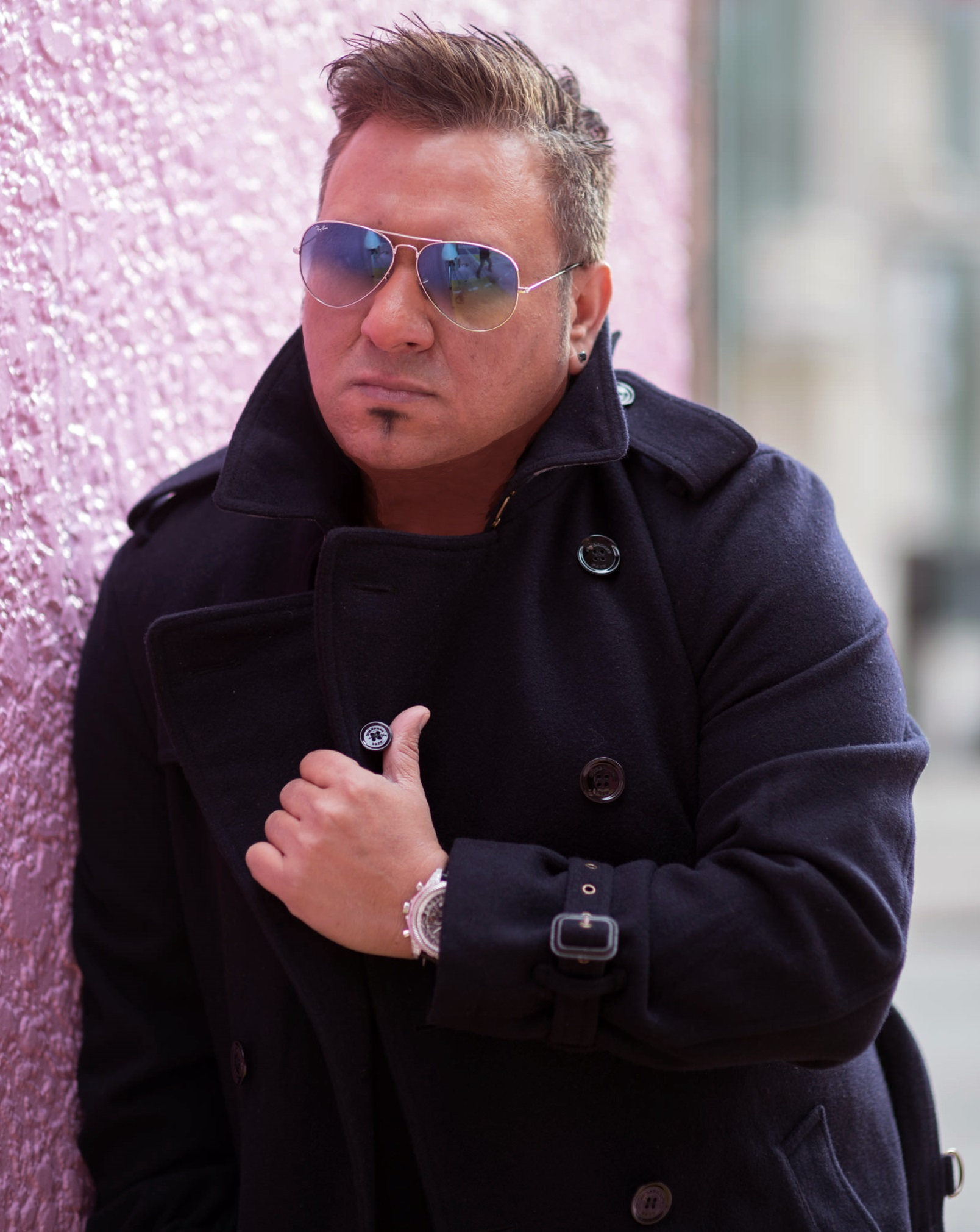

Background information
- Born: London, England, UK
- Genres: Bhangra, bollywood music, Indian pop
- Occupation: Singer-songwriter
- Years active: 2003–present

Luv Randhawa (born 1973) is a Canadian-British singer based in Vancouver, British Columbia. Luv is known for his debut mainstream album entitled Believe In Me which Hit #2 on iTunes R&B/ soul charts. He also known for his solo album This Side of Luv, which was released in 2011. According to CKYE-FM, Luv is the pioneer of the Bhangra Fusion Movement in the western hemisphere.

== Career ==
Luv born in London in 1973. Luv won the Best International Artist in 2020, from the UK Bhangra Awards and has been recognized, by both Provincial & Federal Governments for his contribution in Multiculturalism & Diversity in Music & Arts for Canada.

UrbanAsian reported, in 2003, "Luv participated ZeeTV International Bhangra Awards along with his musical group Signia". Later Luv released his first album "Yours For The Taking" in 2004. Luv collaborated with Nick Chowlia to make the album "Dhol Te" which was featured in Mumbai Mirror. Luv also performed in Sawan Mela that celebrated South Asian culture and community in Vancouver.

== Discography ==
Year	Album	Credit
2004	Yours For The Taking	Solo
2008	Signiatures	Solo
2012	Dhol Te	Single
2014	This Side of Luv	Solo
2014	Kichaay Selfie Kuriye	Solo
2015	Tohr Vekh Kai	Solo
2005	Murder Unveiled	Musical consultant
2004	Pink Ludoos	Musical consultant
2015	Telus(Jingle)	Music producer
2016	Bhangrai	Single
2017	MERRY GO ROUND	Single
2011	Livin’ It Up	Solo
2013	Jhoote Boleya	Solo
2018	Desire	Moka Only / Luv
2019	Guru Nanak Di Sikhi	Amrit DSP / Luv
2019	Rog Ishq	Solo
2020	Haas Kai	Solo
2020	Haaniya	Solo
2021	Believe In Me	Solo
2021	Naam Simran	Solo
