= Matt Paxton =

Canadian singer-songwriter

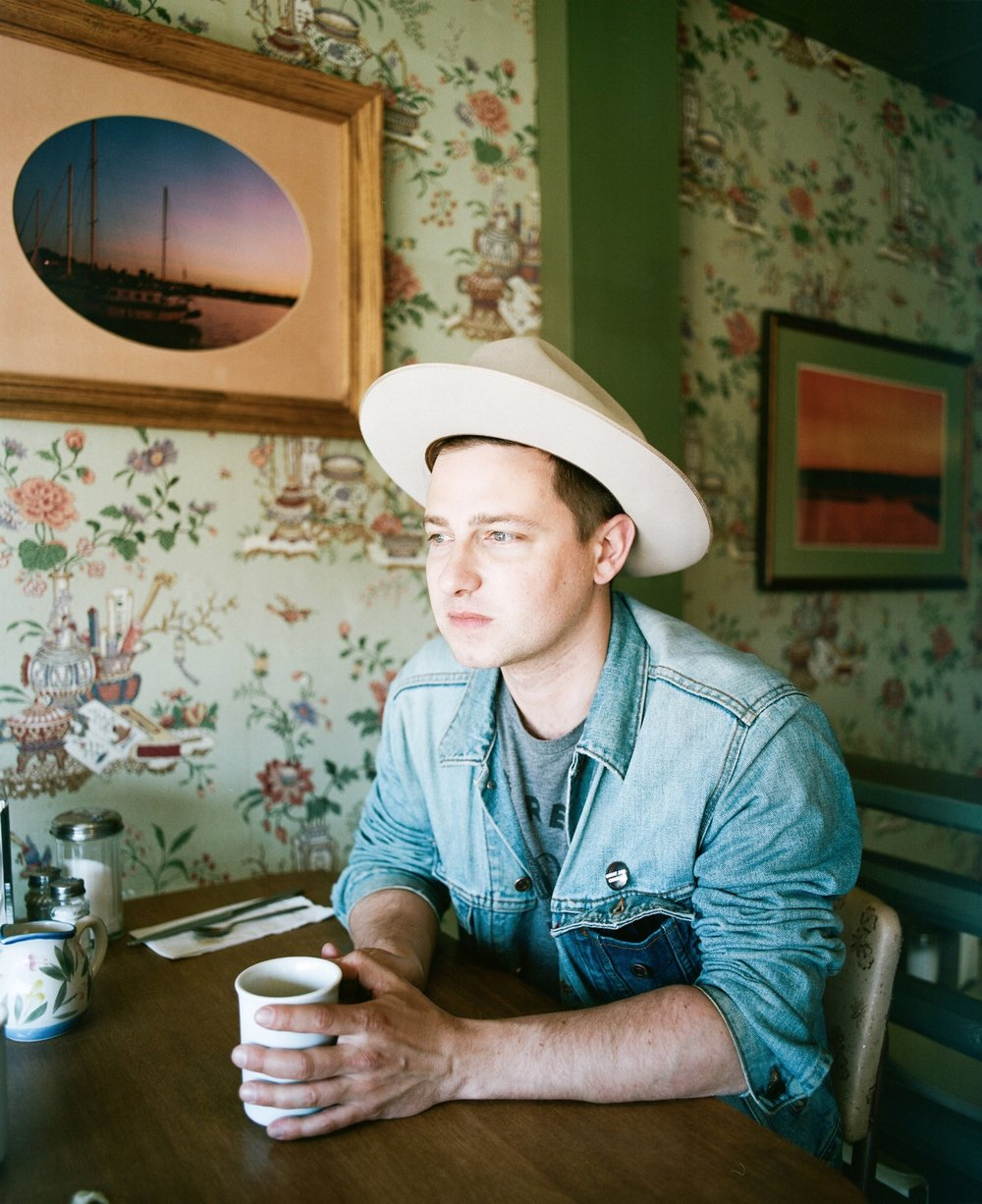

Background information
- Born: May 26, 1985 (age 41); Hamilton, Ontario, Canada
- Genres: Indie, alt-country, folk
- Years active: 2009–present
- Label: Other Songs Music Co.
- Website: www.mattpaxtonmusic.com

Matt Paxton (born Matthew Jeffrey Paxton; May 26, 1985) is a Canadian singer-songwriter from Hamilton, Ontario.

== Career ==
After self-recording and releasing demos in early 2006, Paxton was invited by local producers Michael Keire and Glen Marshall, known for their work with Feist and Apostle of Hustle, to record what would become 2009's "Back Home in the Village". Exclaim! Magazine published, "the hazy, Daniel Lanois-esque vibe complements Paxton's often-laconic delivery, and sets him apart from the common herd of no-nonsense troubadours. That's not to say Paxton's songs are run of the mill. He has a good descriptive sense, and anyone with any experience with gritty, working-class life will relate to everything he's saying. Paxton's produced a solid starting point from which to make his mark."

Paxton has spent some hearty time on the road touring and playing with the likes of Evan Dando, Jason Collett (Broken Social Scene), Blackie and the Rodeo Kings, Chad VanGaalen and many more.

Paxton's "How the Land Lies" was released April 29, 2011 on Down by the Point Records featuring members of Bruce Peninsula and Dark Mean. On January 31, 2012, he released the single titled "Shore Pine Walk" on the Other Songs Music Co. record label followed by an official music video filmed by The Art Institute of Vancouver released on April 1, 2013.> On September 23, 2014, Paxton released an EP titled "Mountain Eyes" and in 2016 released a new EP titled "Let Me Rock N' Roll Tonight" via Other Songs Music Co. His latest offering, "Hunter Street Station Blues", was released in the summer of 2017. Paxton currently lives in Hamilton, Ontario, Canada, and has adopted a new pseudonym, "The Rumblings of Spring", working with producer Michael Keire (Ellevator, The Dirty Nil), on new tracks featuring members of Feist, Apostle of Hustle, Cuff the Duke, and more.

== Discography ==
- Hand Drawn Maps (2006 – Album)
- Back Home in the Village (2009 – Album)
- How the Land Lies (2011 – Album)
- Shore Pine Walk (2012 – Single)
- Factory Town (2012 – Single)
- Mountain Eyes (2014 – EP)
- Let Me Rock N' Roll Tonight (2016 – EP)
- Hand Drawn Maps (Re-Issue) (2016 – Debut EP from 2006)
- Hunter Street Station Blues (2017 – EP)
- The Rumblings of Spring (2019 – EP)
- Dance Me Home (2020 – Single)
