= Amy Honey =

Canadian singer-songwriter

- Origin: West Chezzetcook, Nova Scotia, Canada
- Genres: Americana
- Instruments: vocals, acoustic guitar, electric guitar, bass guitar, drums, piano
- Years active: 1998–present
- Labels: Lance Rock Records, Red Cat Records, Self Righteous Records
- Formerly of: Clover Honey

Amy Honey is a Canadian singer-songwriter from West Chezzetcook, Nova Scotia.

== Background and career ==
Honey was born and reared in rural Nova Scotia and moved to Vancouver in 1996. In 1998, she joined the ' band, Clover Honey, and together they won CiTR radios 1999 "Shindig Battle of the Bands" competition, put out their Go Horse Go album and toured Canada several times.

Honey formed her own band in 2002 and recorded her self-titled debut CD with Scott Henderson at S.O.S. Studios. The album had a mix of various styles of music including punk, roots, folk, metal and garage rock. Also in 2002, she and her husband opened Red Cat Records, an independent record store in Vancouver, BC, specializing in local and rare CDs and dedicated to promoting the releases and shows of local bands. Honey released her second solo album, Pioneer Woman, in 2007. The album was recorded at Tolan McNeil's Lucky Mouse Studios and also features Tolan McNeil, Gregory "Goose" MacDonald, Carolyn Mark, Diona Davies, Ida Nilsen, Grayson Walker and Calvin Dick.

Honey toured Canada in support of her debut album, sharing the stage with Howe Gelb and Mr. Airplane Man. She has also played shows with such diverse performers as Carolyn Mark, Jenny Whiteley, Chris Brown, Andrew Vincent, The Willowz, Po' Girl, Chet, The Doers, Ida Nilsen, Blood Meridian, Veda Hille, Hank Pine & Lily Fawn, 20 Miles and BJ Snowden.

== Discography ==
- Clover Honey, Go Horse Go CD (Lance Rock Records) 2000
1. Dirty Honey
2. Caroline
3. Long Gone
4. It' All Good
5. Late August
6. Omar
7. Alleyway
8. Summer Song
9. The Beast
10. Really Dirty Honey
- Amy's Rocks, Plans CD + Zine (self released) 2001
- Amy Honey, S/T CD (Red Cat Records) 2003
1. Dirtbikin'
2. Do Ya Wanna Play Darts?
3. Porchlights
4. Mishka Lishka
5. Rochon Sands
6. Time Machine
7. Make Me A Woman Tonight
8. Lousy Mom
9. Shady Pines Campground
10. Sabbath!
11. About the Exes
12. Welcomf Home
13. Ride
- Amy Honey, Pioneer Woman CD (Self Righteous Records) 2007
1. Woods Hag
2. Farley Mowat
3. Pioneer Woman
4. Do or Be Damned
5. Red Wine
6. Lily My Deer
7. Larry The Homicidal Maniac
8. Hopeless
9. Maybelline & Billy
10. Sweet Ol' West Chezzetcook
11. Touch 'Em With Love
12. Old Reliable Death

Contributions

- Carolyn Mark, Just Married: An Album of Duets (Mint Records) 2005 – "Rocket Piano Man"
