= K-Bust =

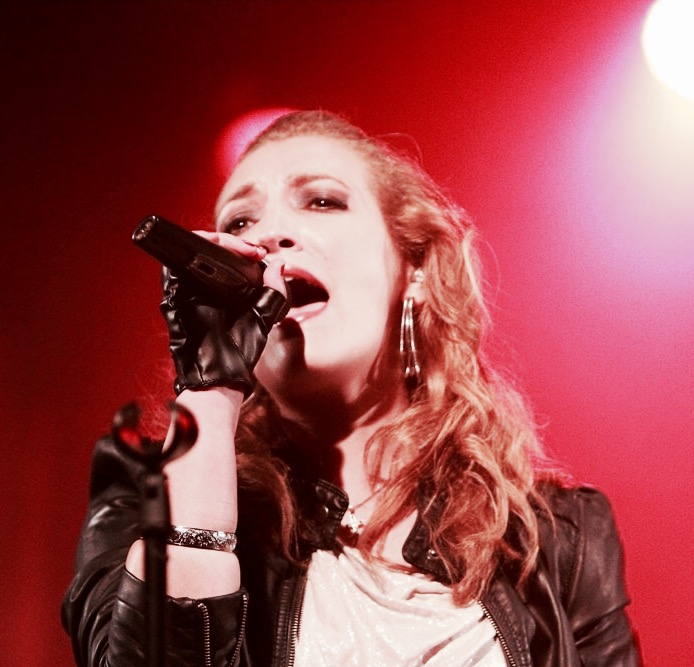
- K-Bust "Urban Stories" album release party.
- Born: Karla Bustamante; Valparaíso, Chile
- Occupations: Singer, songwriter
- Years active: 2004–present
- Musical career
- Genres: Electropop, Indiepop, Urban
- Instruments: Voice, Piano, Guitar, Bass guitar, Ukulele
- Labels: Indi-K Records, Universal Music
- Website: kbust.com

K-Bust (a.k.a. Karla Bustamante) is a Chilean-Canadian singer-songwriter and multi-instrumentalist, born to Chilean parents in the city of Valparaíso. After spending part of her life in Chile, she moved to Montreal, Quebec, Canada, to pursue her music career.

== Early life ==
Her interest in music began at an early age influenced by various Pop artists of her era. Soon she demonstrates an innate musical ability by teaching herself piano at the age of six and then guitar at the age of nine. Years later, encouraged by her grandfather, she attends her first formal classical piano training at the Izidor Handler Music conservatory of Viña del Mar, where she improved both her piano skills and music theory.

== Music career ==
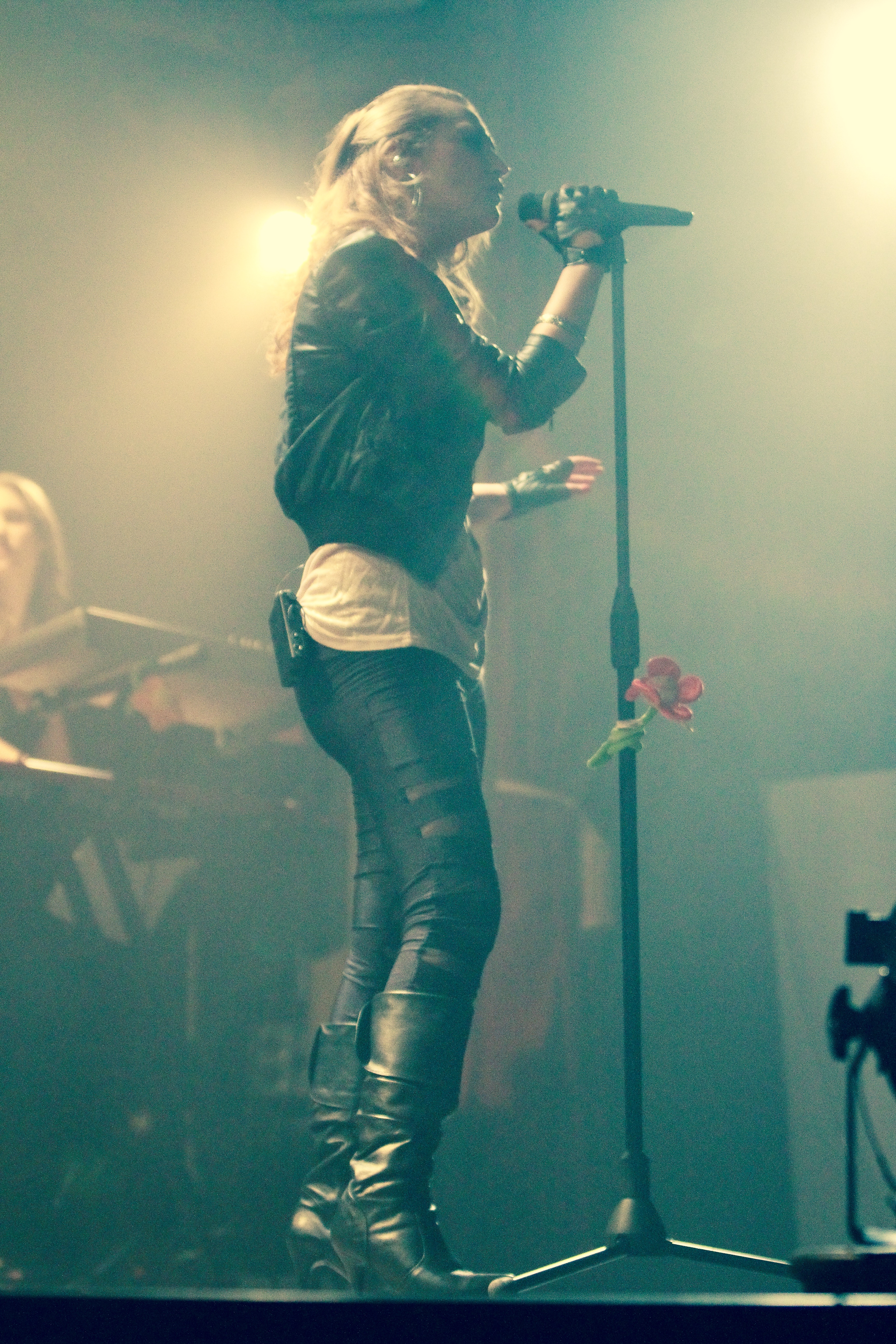
K-Bust in Live show.

K-Bust made her debut in the Montreal local music scene in 2004, subsequently performing in Toronto at various festivals and live music events. During this period, she shared the stage with numerous Pop artists and served as an opening act for Chilean rock band named "Los Prisioneros" during their 2004 North American tour.

As part of her strong interest in music, and her desire to expand her knowledge to a musical production extent, she attended the prestigious Institute of Recording Arts of Canada in 2009 where she graduated as a sound engineer, setting the foundations for the recording of her first demos.

That same year, she collaborates with Benoît Jutras, notorious author/composer of the "Cirque du Soleil", recording one of his songs in studio for the show of Franco Dragone, in Macau.

It's by the end of 2009 that she begins to work on her first studio album. She then joins forces with Sonny Black, a well-known producer of the Montreal Pop scene, working side by side on the 11 songs that would later become part of her debut album; "Urban Stories". Given her ability to perform her songs in various languages; K-Bust decides to include two songs in Spanish and nine in English.

Produced completely under Indi-K Records, an independent label based in Montreal,"Urban Stories" picks the interest of Universal Music, with whom the artist signs a distribution deal in 2012, thus, making her songs available on the main digital music platforms around the world.

In 2013, she continues her first promotional tour in Chile that had previously started in Canada in 2012, performing her debut album for the local audience at many live concerts scheduled in Valparaíso and Santiago. That same year she shoots the first music video of the album for the single "Emotion", in Montreal. This material is then released in September 2013 on the popular music video platform Vevo.

2017 is the year when she releases the first song off her upcoming album "Fearless"; a mix of Electropop and synth-pop, as she describes it. "Over", the first single chosen out of the 11 songs contained in the album, rapidly climbs the DTR Global Top 200 Airplay peaking at number 166, Global Top 150 Independent Airplay peaking at number 48 and Global Top 50 Pop Airplay peaking at number 43.

In October of the same year a new music video for "Over" is released on her official YouTube channel, followed by a second one for "Torn" in January 2018.

== Discography ==
- Urban Stories (2012)
- Urban Stories Deluxe Version (2013)
- Fearless (2018)

=== Urban Stories ===
- Emotion (2012)
- We're One (2012)
- Ahora Que Estás Conmigo (2012)
- Good Times (Bad Times) (2012)
- Everything (Is Not Totally Lost) (2012)
- Fallin' (feat. Nick Lucas) (2012)
- Love's Gone Away (2012)
- I'm Sorry (2012)
- Don't Wanna Try (2012)
- Hey Mama (2012)
- Humo (2012)

=== Urban Stories Deluxe Version ===
- Emotion (2012)
- We're One (2012)
- Ahora Que Estás Conmigo (2012)
- Good Times (Bad Times) (2012)
- Everything (Is Not Totally Lost) (2012)
- Fallin' (feat. Nick Lucas) (2012)
- Love's Gone Away (2012)
- I'm Sorry (2012)
- Don't Wanna Try (2012)
- Hey Mama (2012)
- Humo (2012)
- Don't Wanna Try Remix (Systembanger (2013)
- We're One Remix (Systembanger Remix) (2013)
- Everything Remix (Systembanger Remix) (2013)
- I'm Sorry Remix (Systembanger Remix) (2013)

=== Collaborations ===
- Beautiful' (with Benoît Jutras, 2009)
- Fallin' (with Nick Lucas, 2012)
- Humo' (with Gerardo Castmu, 2012)

== Music videos ==
- "Emotion" (2013)
- "Over" (2017)
- "Torn" (2018)
