= Maybe Smith =

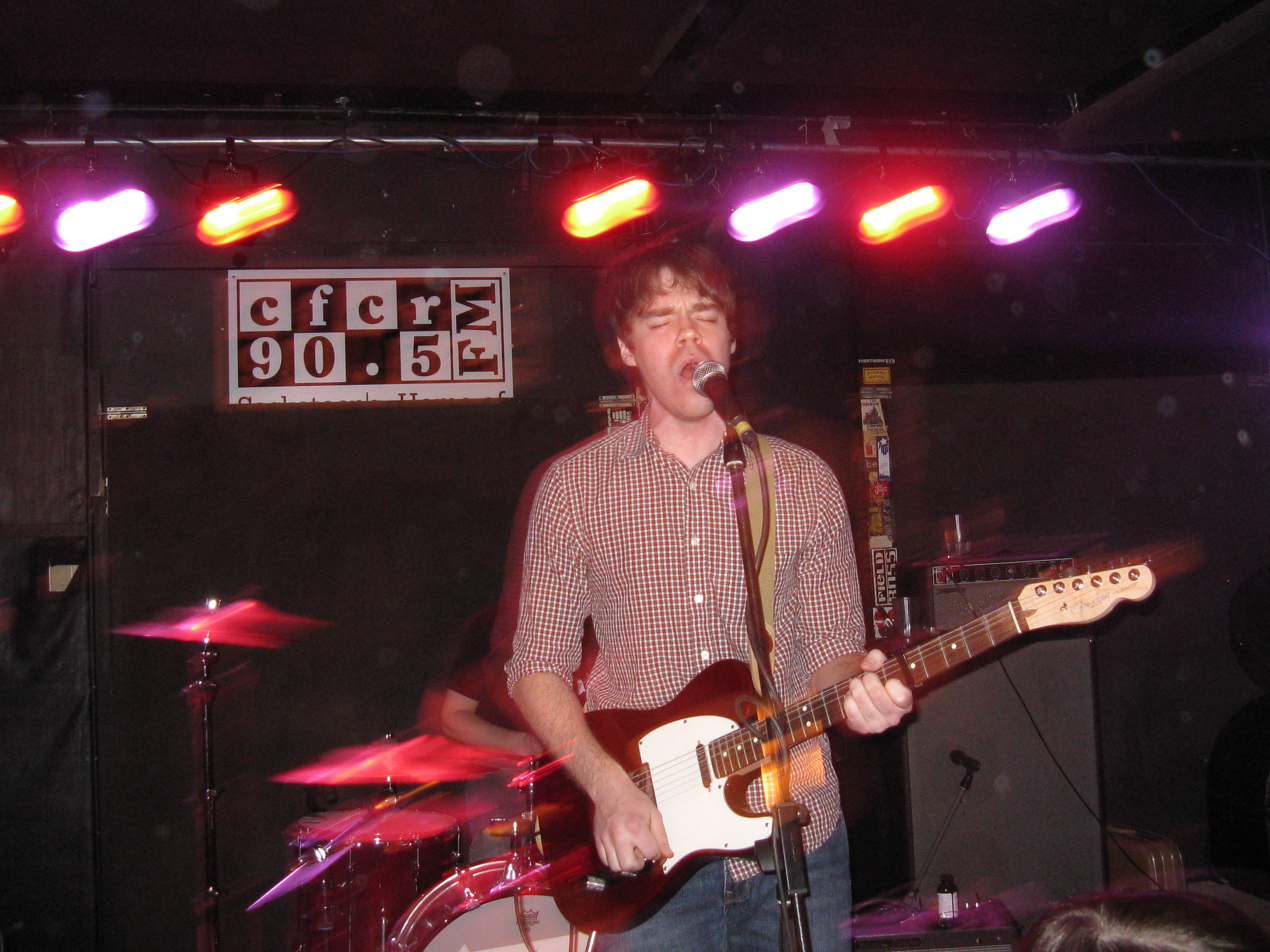
- Maybe Smith (Colin Skrapek)

Background information
- Born: Colin Skrapek
- Genres: Indie rock, Indie pop
- Occupation: Singer-songwriter
- Instruments: Vocals, guitar
- Labels: Sir, Handsome Records
- Website: http://www.sirhandsomerecords.com/

Maybe Smith is the stage name of Colin Skrapek, a Canadian indie pop singer and songwriter from Saskatoon, Saskatchewan. He released five full-length albums and two EPs in the 2000s, primarily on the independent label Sir, Handsome Records.

His style blended glitchy "bedroom" electronic production with folk-rock and country-rock songwriting.

In 2007, he embarked on a cross-Canada tour with Carbon Dating Service. His 2007 album Animals & Architects was a Western Canadian Music Award nominee for Outstanding Rock Album in 2008.

Although he has not released any new music since 2009's Another Murder in the Morning, he continued to be active in Saskatoon's local music scene, including a live performance opening for Grant Lawrence on his book tour to promote The Lonely End of the Rink: Confessions of a Reluctant Goalie, and appearing as a guest musician on The Wastes, a 2015 album by singer-songwriter Dean Summach under the band name Economics.

== Discography ==
- The Arriere Garde EP (2002)
- One for None (2003)
- Root Hug (2004)
- Second Best Death (2005)
- Animals & Architects (2007)
- Snowmen & Scientists EP (2007)
- Another Murder in the Morning (2009)
