= Rozalind MacPhail =

- Birth name: Rozalind MacPhail
- Born: Toronto, Ontario, Canada
- Genres: Folk, electronic
- Occupation: Singer-songwriter
- Instrument(s): Flute, vocals, guitar, toy instruments
- Website: rozalindmacphail.com

Rozalind MacPhail is a Canadian singer-songwriter and multi-instrumentalist.

== Biography ==
Rozalind MacPhail was born in Toronto, Ontario, Canada and grew up on Toronto Island. At the age of thirteen, she adopted the flute after her grandmother read an article on the instrument's positive effects for asthmatics. She currently resides in St. John's, Newfoundland and Labrador where she is an active performer, session musician, film composer and music educator. She is the first Canadian flutist to be sponsored by Gemeinhardt Musical Instruments.

== Music career ==
Rozalind attended University of Toronto in pursuance of a performance degree in flute, and then on to University of Ottawa to study under Robert Cram towards a Master's Degree in Flute Performance. She has made numerous guest appearances as Mystery Flute Girl with indie artists such as Yo La Tengo, Great Lake Swimmers, Constantines, Lou Barlow and more. During her extensive travels she studied with Robert Dick as an Artist-In-Residence at The Atlantic Center for the Arts in Florida, and a became a long-term resident at the Banff Centre.

== Discography ==
- 2019: Don't Let Me Fall Too Far
- 2018: Love and Let Be
- 2017: Sunset Sunrise
- 2016: From the River to the Ocean
- 2014: Head First
- 2011: Painted Houses
- 2007: Edgework
- 2006: Seattle Sessions
- 2005: Gas Station Sessions
- 2004: Rozalind & Friends – Live at Cafe Notalgica
- 2003: Good Kissing School – Lighthousekeepers
