= Fraser & DeBolt =

Canadian folk duo, active in the 1960s and 1970s

Fraser & DeBolt were a Canadian folk duo, active in the late 1960s and early 1970s. Its members were Allan Fraser and Daisy DeBolt (July 19, 1945 – October 4, 2011).

== Career ==
Allan Fraser and Daisy DeBolt met at a workshop at the 1968 Mariposa Folk Festival. Their first words to each other were "I like your voice." As DeBolt puts it, Fraser "knocked on the door and that was it, he never left." Not long after, their budding musical romance found them hitchhiking every day from Toronto to Hamilton, Ontario, to work on material. By the summer of 1969, Fraser & DeBolt was officially formed as a duo.

In 1970, they travelled to the United States on a coffee house circuit tour. During the second week of February, while in upper New York State, they received a message from Ravi Shankar's manager, Jay K. Hoffman. Hoffman signed them to a management contract, and arranged for Fraser & DeBolt to audition for a recording contract. On April 5, 1970, they opened for Tom Paxton at Fillmore East in New York City. The showcase led to two offers, and the duo were signed to Columbia Records. They played the Philadelphia Folk Festival in 1970 and 1971.

Work began in Toronto on their debut album. They were accompanied by the violinist Ian Guenther with production by Craig Allen, who was also the art director for the album cover. On its release in January 1971, one critic, John Gabree of the magazine High Fidelity, writing in the album's liner notes, states that it had "moments when the only possible responses are to laugh aloud or to cry, and there are very few aesthetic experiences that genuinely produce those effects." Reviews appeared in The New York Times, the Los Angeles Free Press and other publications. In 2007, Fallout re-issued this album.

Recording commenced in late 1971 for the follow-up album, With Pleasure, which featured musicians from the Canadian band, Simon Caine. The duo continued to tour and perform across Canada and the United States and, in 1974, they represented North America at the International Song Festival held at Sopot, Poland. Fraser & DeBolt broke up not long after, except for a few reunion appearances.

In November 1994, their story was told in an episode of Adrienne Clarkson Presents on CBC-TV. As recently as January, 2004, their first album was still on the playlists at the radio station WFMU in Jersey City, New Jersey. The Canadian music trade paper, The Record, explained the duo's significance when it wrote, "Fraser & DeBolt were the greatest Canadian band never to have made it."

DeBolt died on October 4, 2011, from cancer, at the age of 66.

== Discography ==
- Fraser & DeBolt With Ian Guenther
  - Released: 1971, Label: Columbia C 30381
1. "All This Paradise"
2. "Gypsy Solitaire"
3. "Them Dance Hall Girls"
4. "David's Tune"
5. "Waltz of the Tennis Players"
6. "Armstrong Tourest Rest Home"
7. "Fraser and Debolt Theme"
8. "Old Man on the Corner"
9. "Warmth"
10. "Stoney Day"
11. "Pure Spring Water"
12. "Don't Let Me Down"

In reviewing this release, Mark Allan, of Allmusic, commented that "One of the many sad secrets of the popular music business is the way this little gem languished in obscurity. It should have been heard by millions, but disappeared at the height of psychedelia. Two years later, The Band found an audience with haunting tales of bygone rustic North American life with their seminal, self-titled second album. Widespread acclaim eluded the earlier outing by this unheralded Canadian trio. The songs, most written independently by Daisy DeBolt or Allan Fraser, are poetic."

After hearing an acetate, John Gabree, in a review published in High Fidelity in 1971 (and reproduced as the album's liner notes), described Fraser & DeBolt With Ian Guenther as "one of the best pop albums I have ever heard."

The recording has never been legally released or reissued on compact disc.

- Fraser & DeBolt With Pleasure
  - Released: 1973, Label: Columbia KC 32130
1. "Broad Daylight Woman" (3:12)
2. "Columbus Hits the Shoreline Rag" (3:40)
3. "I Want to Dance with You" (3:01)
4. "Cleo's Couch" (2:57)
5. "Big Time Charlie" (4:25)
6. "Sister Nell & Dirty Reuben" (1:58)
7. "Two Rainbows" (4:09)
8. "This Storm Shall Surely Pass" (5:45)
9. "Why-Kiki" (3:39)
10. "Waiting for the Harvest in Garf's Front Yard (Pure Spring Water #2)" (4:23)

The following double album is of out-takes and board tapes of some performances of Fraser & DeBolt. Also released on vinyl in limited quantities.

- Fraser & DeBolt - This Song Was Borne
  - Released: 2015, Label: Roaratorio roar039
1. "Armstrong Tourest Rest Home" (5:30)
2. "Daisy Sky" (5:58)
3. "The Snowdrift Song" (2:50)
4. "Hey, What's In It For Me?" (3:28)
5. "I Threw It All Away" (2:19)
6. "Dandelion Wine" (3:37)
7. "All Through The Stone House" (5:02)
8. "Preserve Me In Alcohol" (5:05)
9. "Calypso Joe" (3:09)
10. "Doors Will Appear (...And Swing Open)" (4:45)
11. "Geneva" (2:53)
12. "Abide With Me" (3:09)
13. "Amsterdam" (4:34)
14. "This Song Was Borne" (2:53)
15. "Peace In Hand Hold" (5:13)
16. "Prairie Love" (3:29)
17. "We Shall Be Delivered" (4:50)
18. "Josephine" (2:58)
19. "Whitecaps (Just Beyond The Bay)" (5:42)
20. "Sincerely I Remain, Still Your Friend" (4:22)
