= The McDades =

Canadian folk band

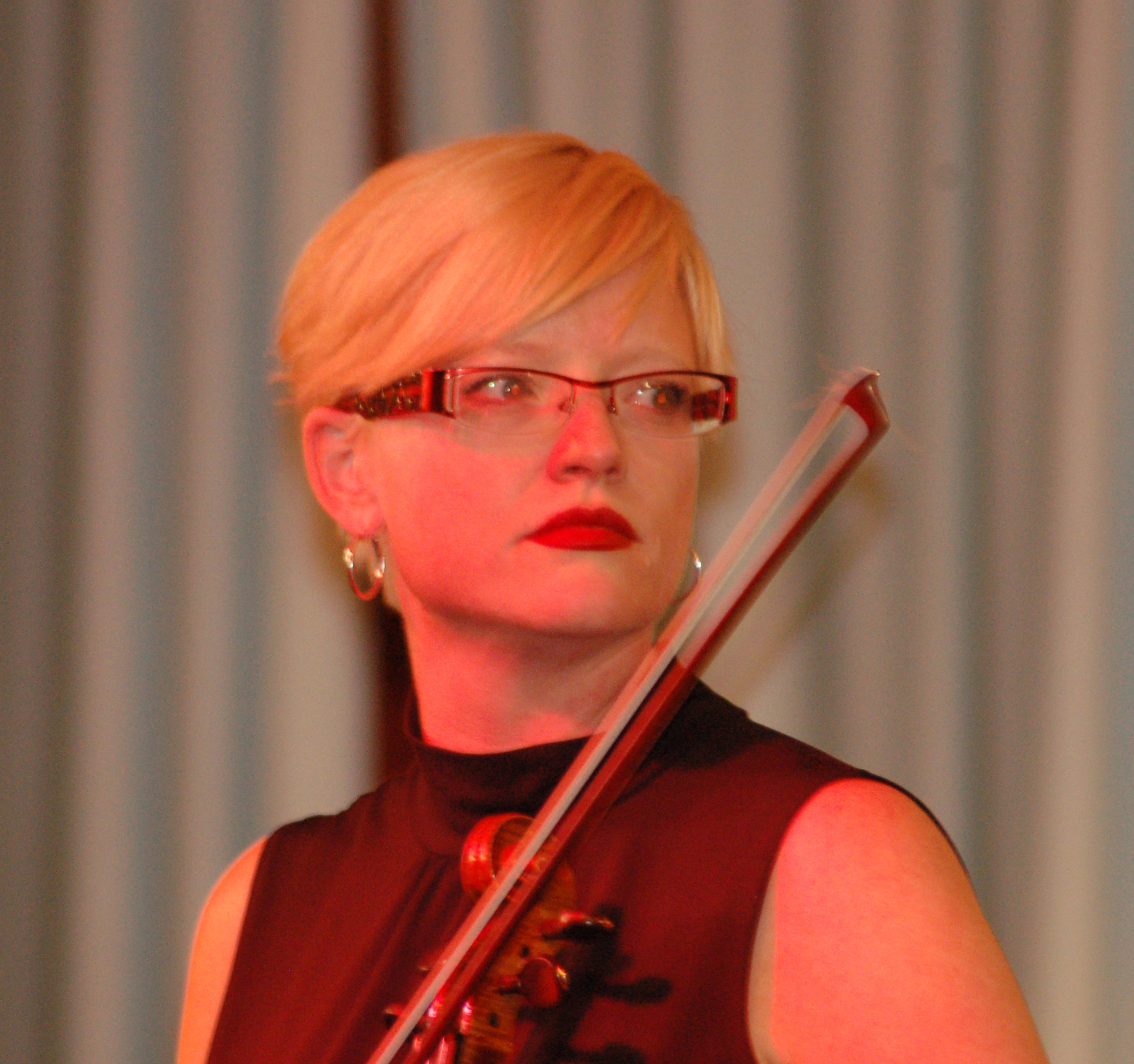
- Shannon Johnson of the McDades

Background information
- Origin: Edmonton, Alberta, Canada
- Genres: Folk
- Years active: 2000–present
- Members: Shannon Johnson; Jeremiah McDade; Solon McDade
- Website: www.themcdades.com

The McDades are a Canadian folk band made up of siblings Shannon Johnson (violin and vocals), Solon McDade (bass and vocals), and Jeremiah McDade (multi-instrumentalist and vocals).

The McDades were performers at an early age, playing folk music with their parents, Terry and Danielle McDade, in the McDade Family Band from 1974–1994. The siblings performed at the Canadian National Exhibition, the Commonwealth Games, and for the British Royal Family. They formed the McDades in 2000.

In 2012, they were the subject of the documentary The McDades - Brother Brother Sister Making Music.

== Discography ==
- The Empress (Free Radio Records, Nov 12, 2021)
- Bloom (Free Radio, 2006) – 2007 Juno Award Winner - Best Roots/Traditional Album (group), 2007 Independent Music Award Winner - Best World Album Traditional, two time Canadian Folk Music Award Winners Best World Group & Best Instrumental Group)
- For Reel (Free Radio, 2002)

With Terry McDade

- Harpe Danse (Free Radio, 1998)
- Midwinter (Free Radio, 2003)
- Noel (Free Radio, 2004)
- Winter Rose (Free Radio, 2011)

With Maria Dunn

- From Where I Stand
- For a Song
- We Were Good People
- The Peddler
