= Maria Dunn (musician) =

- Born: Scotland
- Genres: Celtic folk with North American bluegrass and country influences
- Occupations: Musician singer-songwriter
- Years active: Since 1998
- Labels: Independent
- Website: www.mariadunn.com

Maria Dunn is a Juno-winning Canadian songwriter and musician. She has been described as "an arrestingly powerful singer-songwriter who writes great historical and social commentary." A storyteller through song, her music blends Celtic folk with North American bluegrass and country influences.

== Early life ==
Born in Scotland, she moved as a child with her family to Ontario. She has made Edmonton, Alberta her base since the 1990s.

As a child, she studied classical piano and sang in several community choirs. She later studied psychology at the University of Alberta. From 1987 to 2000, she hosted a weekly folk music program on the U of A's campus/community radio, CJSR. Immersing herself in folk music in this way, she gravitated towards writing her own songs.

She has released eight albums, including Hardscrabble Hope (released November 2025) and Juno-winning and Juno-nominated recordings: Joyful Banner Blazing (2022 Juno Winner - Traditional Roots Album of the Year), Gathering (2017 Juno Nominee), which features a song she wrote ("Malala") inspired by Malala Yousafzai, and For a Song (2002 Juno Nominee), all produced by Shannon Johnson of Juno Award winning band The McDades. She performs (solo, ensemble) at theatres, folk clubs, conferences and festivals across Canada, the USA and Europe. She has been featured on Canadian TV, CBC National Radio, CKUA Alberta Radio, BBC Radio Scotland, and her songs published in Sing Out! and Penguin Eggs magazine and the Rise Again (songbook) (2015). Other artists, including Niamh Parsons (The Peddler), The Outside Track (Poor Lonesome Hen), Aengus Finnan (Orphan Hand) and Bob Bossin (We Were Good People), have recorded her original songs.

In October 2025, music journalist Roddy Campbell (founder and editor of now-retired Penguin Eggs Magazine) wrote a biography of Maria's work, from her debut album in 1998 up to and including the release of Hardscrabble Hope, in which he concludes that Maria is "one who continues to challenge preconceptions of that thing called folk music. A national treasure at the very least."

Maria appeared in the 2002 documentary CKUA: Radio Worth Fighting For.

Her 2012 album Piece by Piece narrates the story of immigrant textile workers in western Canada, notably at the GWG factory in Edmonton. The songs were written for a multimedia show entitled GWG: Piece By Piece developed in collaboration with videographer Don Bouzek and historian Catherine C. Cole. An early performance of the show was held at the Royal Alberta Museum in 2009.

Her 2022 Juno-winning album Joyful Banner Blazing (released January 29, 2021) spent 4 weeks at #1 on CKUA Radio (Alberta-wide) Top 30 Chart in Alberta and ended the year at #6 on Alberta-wide CKUA Radio’s Top 100 albums of 2021; #2 on The Penguin Eggs Critics’ Poll Albums of the Year 2021 (Roots Music Canada). Joyful Banner Blazing also spent 5 months (Jan–May 2021) in the Top Albums of the Month on the Folk Alliance International Folk Chart, peaking at #7 in March 2021.

Dunn is also a long-time collaborator with the Women of Folkways series produced by the Sound Studies Institute and Northern Lights Folk Club. This annual concert is dedicated to the celebration by women of women in the Folkways records catalogue.

== Discography ==
- From Where I Stand (1998)
- For A Song (2001) (Nominated in 2002 for Juno; Roots/Traditional Solo category)
- We Were Good People (2004) ("struggles of working class people in Western Canada during the 20th Century")
- The Peddler (2008) (Nominated in 2009 for the Canadian Folk Music Award Solo artist of the Year).
- Piece By Piece (2012) (Nominated in 2013 for a Canadian Folk Music Award - Solo artist of the Year)
- Gathering (2016) (Nominated in 2017 for a Juno; Traditional Roots Album)
- Joyful Banner Blazing (2021) (2022 Juno Winner; Traditional Roots Album)
- Hardscrabble Hope (2025)
