= Steinbach Regional Secondary School =

High school in Steinbach, Manitoba, Canada

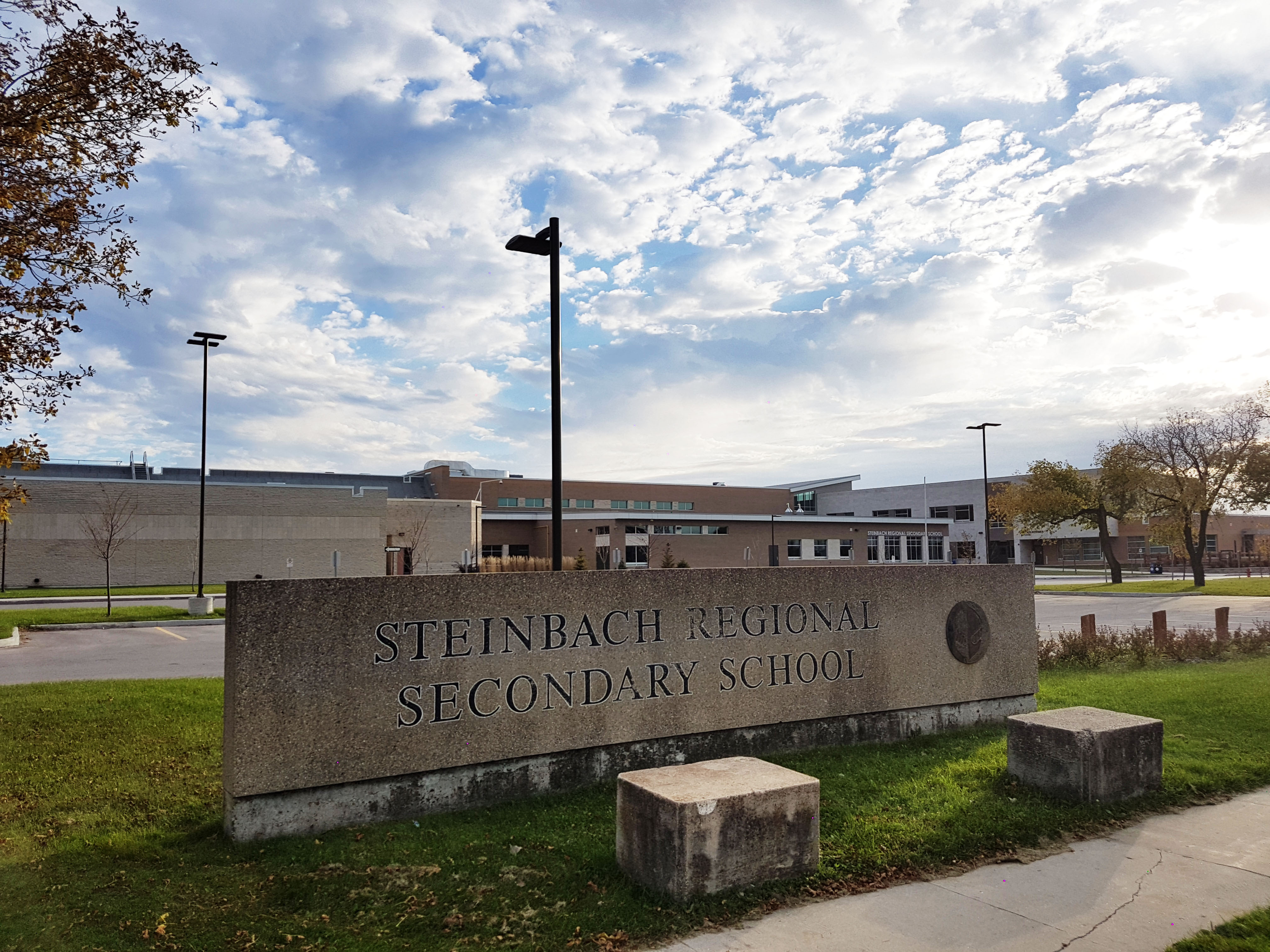

Location
- Steinbach, Manitoba; Canada; 49°30′58.5″N 96°41′16.5″W

Information
- Type: Public secondary
- Established: 1972
- School district: Hanover School Division
- Principal: Sherry Bestvaler & Cam Kelbert
- Enrollment: 2,000+ (2023)
- Colours: Yellow and Black
- Mascot: Sabres
- Website: srss.ca

Steinbach Regional Secondary School is a large secondary school from grades 9–12 located in Steinbach, Manitoba, and the largest high school in the province with a capacity of 2,200 students. The school offers extensive academic, arts, music and vocational programming and is among the largest high schools in the country. Steinbach Regional is part of Hanover School Division, which is the second largest school division in Manitoba after the Winnipeg School Division. The sports teams are known as the Sabres.

== History ==
The school was built in 1972 and was opened by then premier, Ed Schreyer on January 25, 1973. A second expansion of 100,000 square feet to the school was completed in 2014 and grade nine was added to the school.

== Notable alumni ==
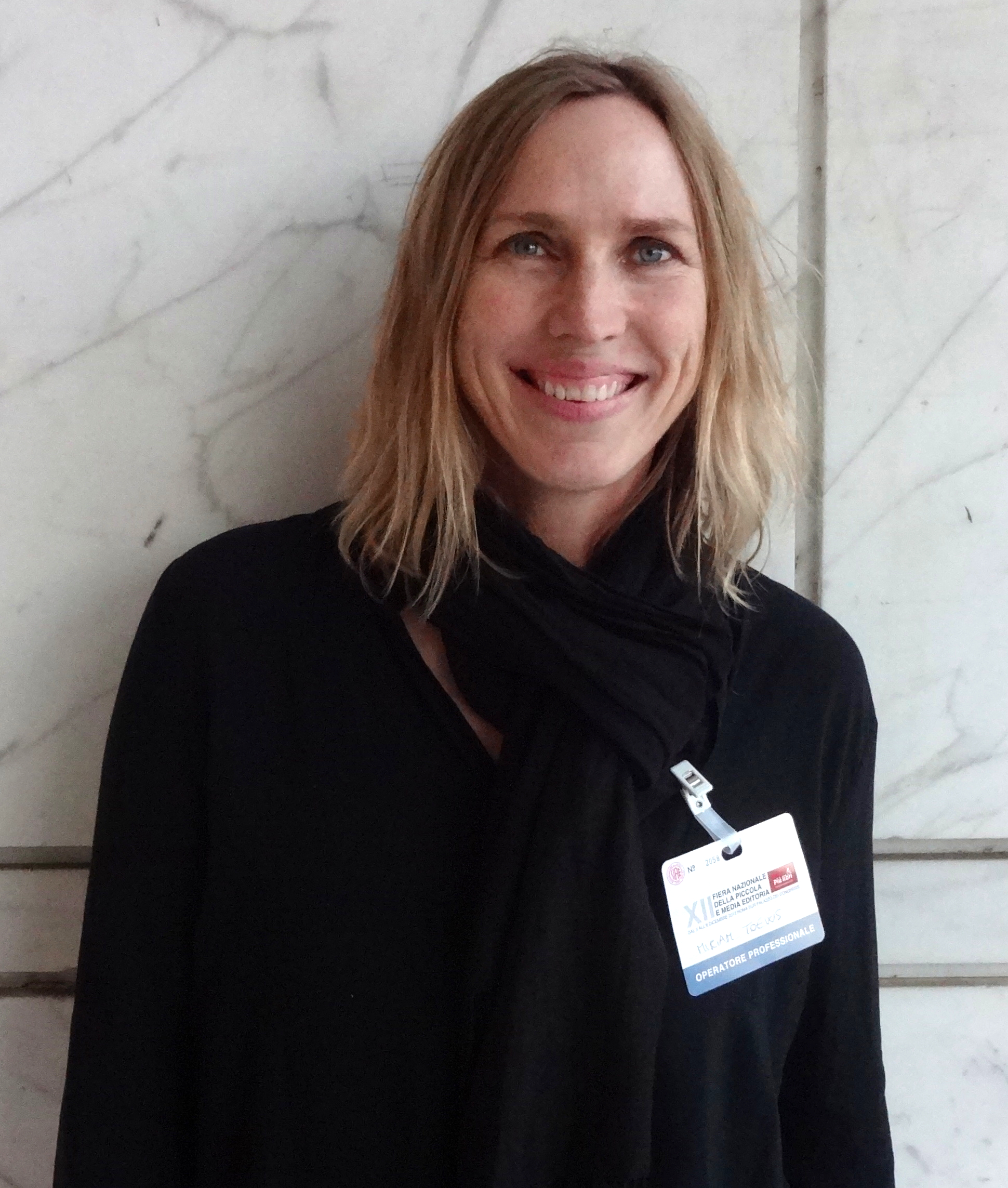
SRSS graduate Miriam Toews

- Scott Bairstow, actor
- Matt Epp, musician
- Ted Falk, politician
- Kelvin Goertzen, 23rd Premier of Manitoba
- Megan Imrie, Olympian, biathlon
- Ralph Krueger, European and NHL hockey coach
- Eric Loeppky, volleyball player
- Chris Neufeld, Brier-winning curler
- Vic Peters, Brier-winning curler
- The Pets, rock band
- Byron Rempel, author
- Royal Canoe, rock band
- Michelle Sawatzky-Koop, Olympian, volleyball
- Miriam Toews, award-winning novelist
- The Undecided, punk band
- The Waking Eyes, rock band
- Ian White, NHL hockey player
