= Serena Ryder =

Canadian musician (born 1982)

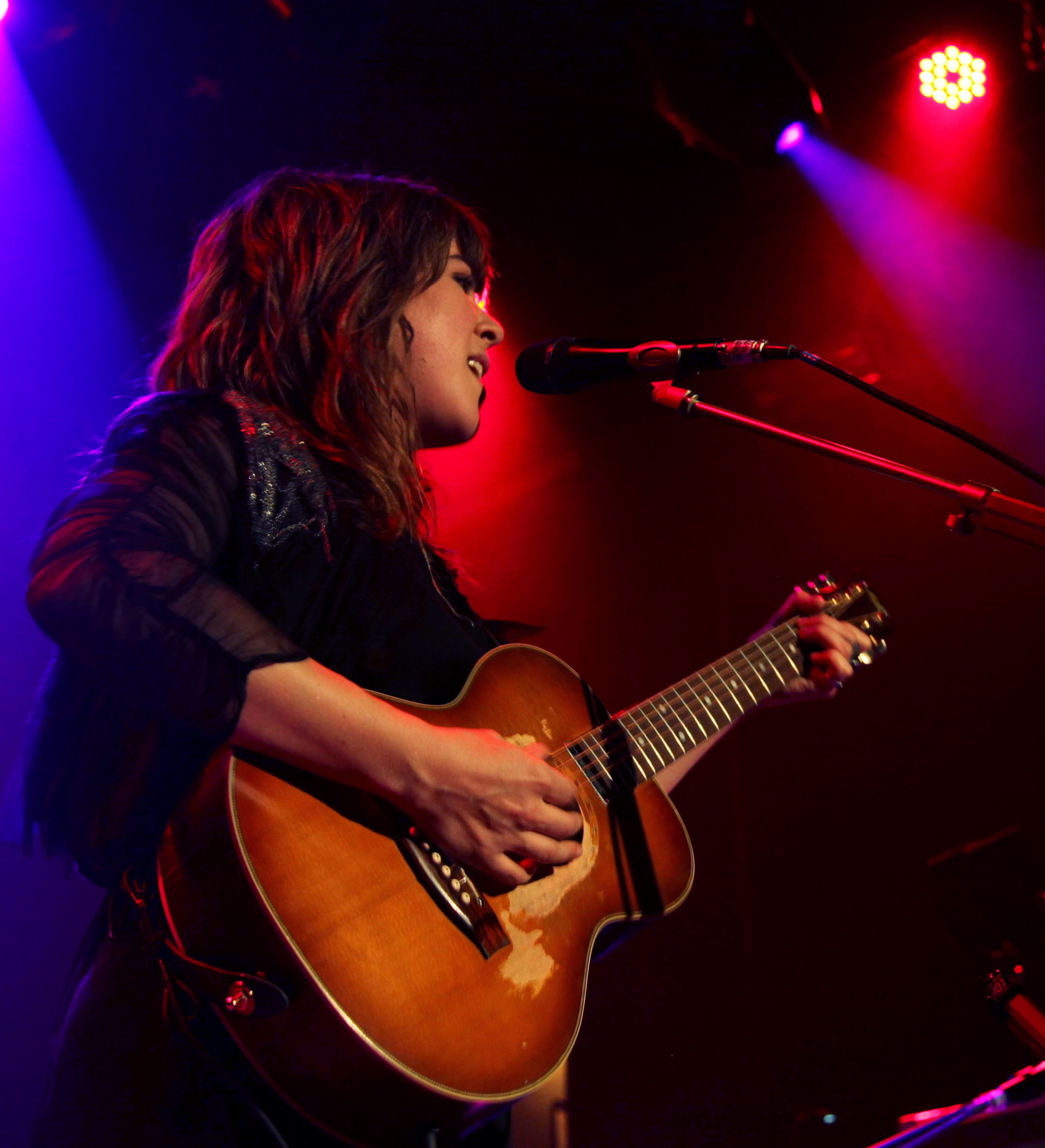
- Ryder at Bowery Ballroom, May 2013

Background information
- Born: Serena Lauren Ryder; December 8, 1982 (age 43); Toronto, Ontario, Canada
- Origin: Peterborough, Ontario, Canada
- Genres: folk rock, indie rock, jazz, pop rock
- Occupations: Singer-songwriter, music producer
- Instruments: Vocals, guitar, drums
- Years active: 1999–present
- Labels: Universal Music Canada; Mime Radio; Isadora; Atlantic; EMI; ABC
- Website: www.serenaryder.com

Serena Lauren Ryder (born December 8, 1982) is a Canadian singer-songwriter. Born in Toronto, she grew up in Millbrook, Ontario. Ryder first gained national recognition with her ballad "Weak in the Knees" in 2007 and has released eight studio albums.

== Early life and musical interest ==
Serena Lauren Ryder is the daughter of Barbara Ryder and Glen Sorzano and was born into a musical family. Her biological father was a Trinidadian musician who immigrated to Canada in the early sixties. Ryder, the youngest of three children, was raised by Barbara and her second husband, Andrew McKibbon, just outside Peterborough, in Millbrook, Ontario, and grew up listening to old records by the Beatles and Leonard Cohen from her parents' collection. At age eight, Ryder sang at Royal Canadian Legion halls and motels. Having received a guitar from her stepfather, she began playing the instrument at the age of thirteen. Songwriting efforts followed.

== Career ==
=== 1998–2005: beginnings ===
At age 17, Ryder left her home for Peterborough, Ontario, where she settled into a community of artists while attending the Integrated Arts Program at the Peterborough Collegiate and Vocational Institute.

In early 1998, Damon de Szegheo, record producer and owner of the Peterborough-based independent record label Mime Radio, approached her about recording. de Szegheo had noticed her when she sang during a set change for a local stage production of Gone with the Wind. The product of their recording sessions (Serena's first time in studio) was a self-titled promotional cassette, Serena (limited to a run of 100 copies) and her first full-length CD, Falling Out, released in December 1999.

During that time, de Szegheo also managed Ryder's touring career and organized many live concert appearances for her with local and touring acts including bands Thousand Foot Krutch, Three Days Grace (then named Groundswell) and Juno-nominated folk artist Craig Cardiff.

Ryder was later managed by Kellie Bonnici. Bonnici approached Ryder with an offer to help her after being moved by her performance at the 2001 Peterborough Folk Festival, where Ryder was awarded the Festival's first “Emerging Artist” award. This award enabled Ryder and Bonnici to attend a regional music festival conference and make some initial connections. Bonnici worked with Ryder to release Live at the Market Hall and A Day in the Studio in 2002.

While Ryder was playing her first show at the Black Sheep Inn in Wakefield, Quebec, owner Paul Symes called Bill Stunt, the producer of the CBC Radio program Bandwidth, and left a voicemail of the live show. This led Stunt and Symes to invite Ryder for a performance recorded by CBC Bandwidth at the Black Sheep Inn. The recording was later released as a live EP, Serena Ryder Live.

Ryder was invited by Erin Benjamin (then the president of the Ontario Council of Folk Festivals) to perform in Winnipeg at a regional music conference. There, her manager Bonnici met the CBC radio host Avril Benoit during one of Ryder's showcases. They later arranged an interview for Ryder on CBC's Here and Now, which caught the attention of the musician Hawksley Workman and Sandy Pandya, who was then his manager. After initial meetings with Workman and Pandya, Ryder was invited to record on Workman's Isadora label. Shortly thereafter, Ryder and Bonnici amicably parted ways, and Ryder began working with Pandya and Bonnie O'Donnell in 2004.

In 2005, Isadora Records released Live in Oz, a recording from Ryder's tour of Australia, in limited numbers available only at live performances.

=== 2005–2007: Early singles ===
In 2005, backed by Workman and two other players, Ryder recorded her debut album with a major label, Unlikely Emergency. The album did well enough to earn Ryder a performance at the 2005 Canadian Songwriters Hall of Fame press conference, after which it was suggested she cover songs written by other Canadian musicians. Meanwhile, the poignant song "Just Another Day" got considerable airplay on various Canadian radio stations. In November 2006, Ryder released her second album, If Your Memory Serves You Well, a collection of 12 covers of notable Canadian songs and three original songs. The tracks include Sylvia Tyson's “You Were On My Mind”, Leonard Cohen's "Sisters of Mercy", Galt MacDermot's "Good Morning Starshine" the Bob Dylan–Rick Danko collaboration "This Wheel's on Fire", and Paul Anka's "It Doesn't Matter Any More."

The EP Told You in a Whispered Song, released on June 19, 2007, is an acoustic studio collection of several live tracks and new songs by Ryder. Touring in Canada, Ryder was part of Blast From The Beach in Prince Edward Island on July 21, 2007 headlined by Aerosmith and featuring other notable bands, including 54-40 and Cheap Trick. Touring in Australia that same year, Ryder appeared as a guest on SBS's RocKwiz in March, where she displayed an authoritative knowledge of rock music, singing song segments in answer to questions presented to her; she also performed in the closing guest spot, with Lior.

=== 2008–present: Critical acclaim and chart success ===
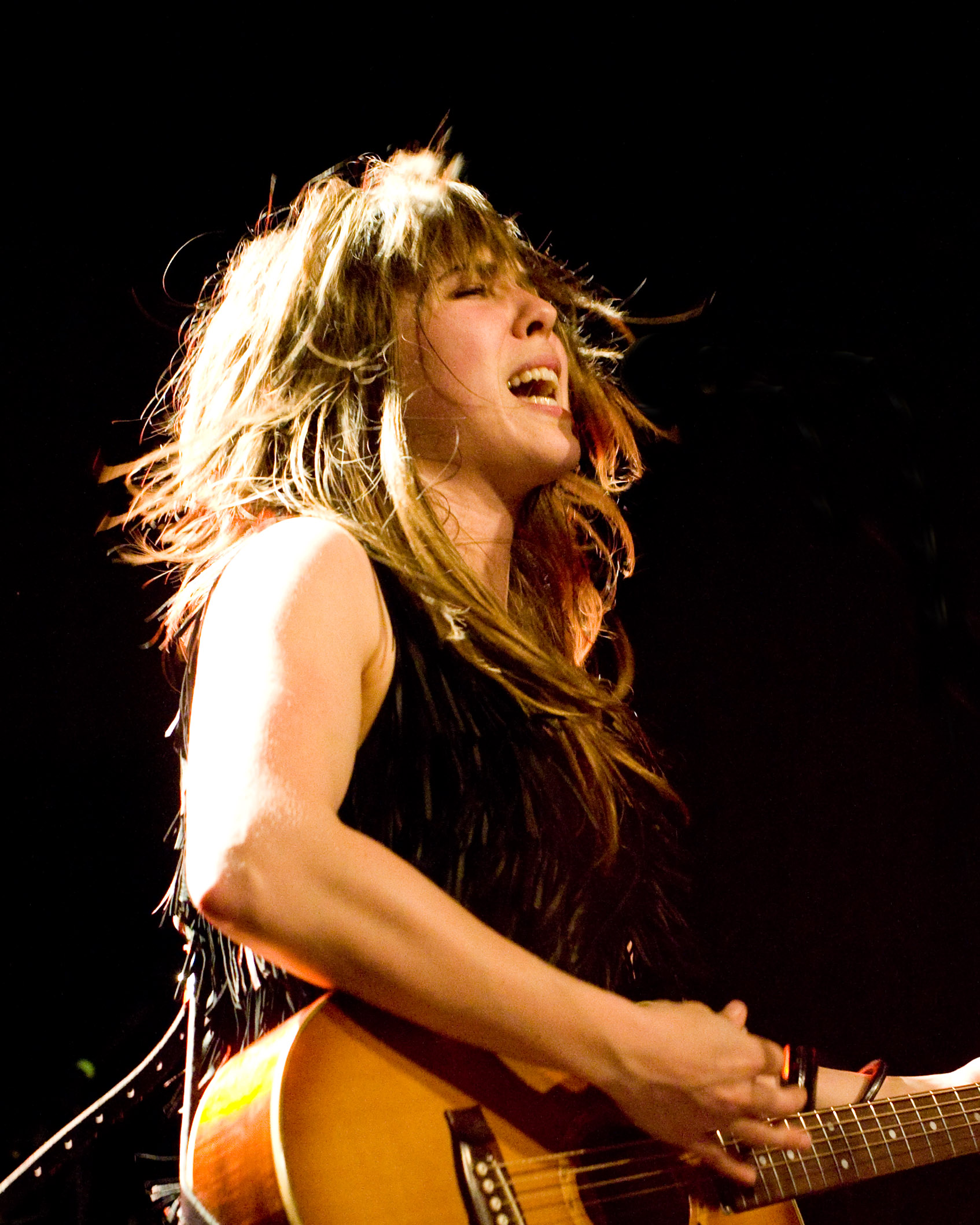
Ryder in 2009

In April 2008, Ryder found herself receiving the 2008 Juno Award for "Best New Artist of the Year" while on the label EMI. On November 11, 2008, Is It O.K., was released in Canada on EMI Canada and on Atlantic Records in the United States on February 11, 2009. The single "Little Bit of Red", which won a Juno Award in 2010 for Best Video of the Year, was released on that album. As well, "All for Love", which appears on Is It O.K. and the EP Sweeping the Ashes, was featured in an episode of ABC television's Private Practice. In Canada, Is It O.K. won the Juno Award for Adult Alternative Album of the Year in 2009. In the United States, the album got a warm reaction and Ryder furthered her foray into the U.S. by recording the duet "You Can Always Come Home" with American Idol Jason Castro on his debut album. In May 2009, Ryder appeared on Bruce Springsteen's official website, covering his song "Racing in the Street". The video was part of the "Hangin' on E Street" feature of his website. That year, her song "Sing, Sing" was selected for Music Monday, a special event to highlight music education in Canada, for which nearly two million Canadian schoolchildren sang the song in class on May 5.

In July 2010, Ryder joined the lineup of Lilith Fair along with Sara Bareilles, Jill Hennessy, Emily Robinson, and Martie Maguire. On February 19, 2011, Ryder toured with Melissa Etheridge across Canada. Ryder's song "Broken Heart Sun" was performed as a duet with Etheridge, and a recording was released on her EP Live. Ryder performed "Broken Heart Sun" with Etheridge at the Juno Awards that same year. In 2011, Ryder fell in love, and it inspired her for her fifth studio album, Harmony. Over 65 songs were written for the album; “[i]t feels like it's the first time I've written ...in love”, she said.

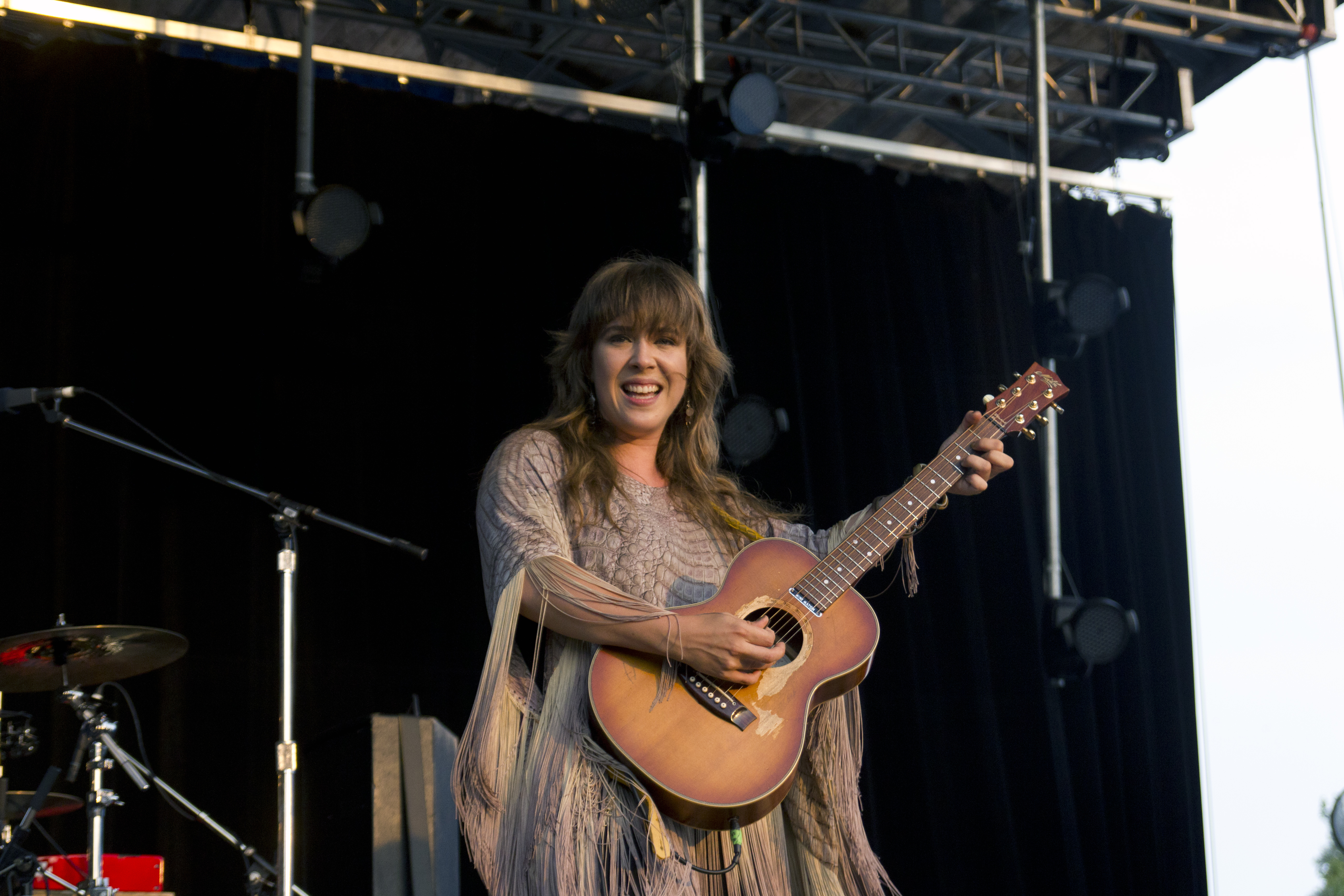
Ryder at Hillside, 2011

After writing more songs while in Los Angeles with Jerrod Bettis and Jon Levine, Ryder released Harmony on November 27, 2012. The first single "Stompa", co-written with Bettis, was used in an episode of ABC television's Grey's Anatomy, quickly climbed the charts, and became certified platinum in January 2013. In the United States, less than two months after its release, it was at number 14 on the charts. In Canada, Ryder became the first Canadian artist to be number one on the CBC's Radio 2 Top 20 chart, days after the release of Harmony. “Stompa” was played in four radio station formats: Modern Rock, Hot AC, Top 40 and Adult Contemporary. Ryder's song "What I Wouldn't Do" is used in the promotional video for the Saskatchewan Roughriders.

Ryder performed at the opening night of Luminato Festival on June 14, 2013 in Toronto, Ontario. She also performed in Calgary, Alberta on July 6, 2013 as part of the Calgary Stampede. On July 17, 2013, Ryder made her late night show debut, performing "Stompa" on The Tonight Show with Jay Leno. In 2014, Ryder performed O Canada for the 2014 NBA All-Star Game. She also provided vocals for the song "In The Morning" on the fifth studio album by Canadian rock band, The Trews. In March 2014, Ryder co-hosted the Juno Awards of 2014, and won Artist of the Year and Songwriter of the Year. In May 2015, Ryder recorded "Together We Are One", the official theme song for the 2015 Pan American Games. The song reached #1 on the Radio 2 Top 20 the week of July 17, 2015. She performed at the Pan Am Games Closing Ceremony.

In August 2015, Ryder performed on CBC TV's "Quietest Concert Ever on the Ocean Floor", which took place on the ocean floor during low tide at Fundy National Park in New Brunswick, Canada. During this pre-recorded concert documentary (also available to stream on YouTube), she performed songs from her upcoming album titled Utopia. The televised broadcast of this concert was on September 25, 2015. On June 24, 2016, Ryder released the single "Got Your Number" and dropped her sixth studio album Utopia on May 26, 2017, containing 17 songs. The EP Electric Love was released the same day for the U.S. and European markets but not in Canada. Utopia's first single was "Electric Love."

On March 9, 2018, Ryder's song "Be the Ones" was chosen to be the official theme song for 2018 Arctic Winter Games. On April 6, 2018, Ryder released her single "Famous" featuring Simon Ward of The Strumbellas for the US market. Co-written with Simon Wilcox and Simon Ward, "Famous" is a song about society being obsessed with social media and people trying to achieve fame solely for the sake of being famous. On September 9, Ryder was invited for a duet with Brett Kissel at the Canadian Country Music Association (CCMA) Awards in Hamilton. The CCMA Awards was hosted by Shania Twain. On September 23, Ryder started hosting her own radio program, The Serena Ryder Radio Show on CHFI-FM, which aired across Canada for eight weeks. In September 2019, Ryder participated in the co-launch of ArtHaus, a collaborative space and recording studio based in Toronto. The management relationship and commercial partnership associated with the venture have since been dissolved, with all active professional representation handled exclusively by Paquin Entertainment Group.

At the Juno Awards of 2021, Ryder performed with William Prince as a duet vocalist on Prince's song "The Spark", in a performance recorded at Toronto's Church of the Holy Trinity. In 2022, Prince and Ryder also released the standalone single "Sing Me a Song".

In 2022, Ryder won her seventh Juno Award for Adult Contemporary Album of the Year for her album The Art of Falling Apart.

On May 11, 2022 Ryder received the first Songwriting and Music Publishing award for her hit song "Weak In the Knees" by Music Publishers Canada (MPC) and Music Canada ahead of her participation to the 2022 Juno Songwriters’ Circle at Massey Hall.

In 2023, Ryder's 2013 hit "What I Wouldn't Do" was covered as a supergroup charity single, to benefit Kids Help Phone's Feel Out Loud campaign for youth mental health. The cover, which included Ryder's direct participation, also interpolated parts of Leela Gilday's song "North Star Calling".

On April 28, 2023, Great Lake Swimmers released "Swimming Like Flying", the 5th track of their eighth album, Uncertain Country. Ryder sang the guest vocals on the track. That song was written in memory of Bonnie O'Donnell, a passionate swimmer and close friend of Tony Dekker and Ryder. O'Donnell co-managed Ryder from 2004 until her sudden death in January 2008 at age 32.

In 2025, Ryder ended her professional relationship with Pandya.

While performing at the Churchill Park Music Festival in St. John's, Newfoundland on Saturday July 25, 2026, Ryder performed an unreleased song, her first since the release of her 2021 album, "The Art of Falling Apart". Entitled "Tea and Marmalade", the folk ballad talks about not professing one's love directly and the regret that the loved one believed feelings were not mutual. The song asks "Did someone write your name on a birthday cake?", informing listeners the loved one remained single over the years as true love never dies.

On September 17, 2026 Ryder co-released the new single "Lily" personifying Fern McArthur, the activist and folk musician in Vivek Shraya's latest novel The Hystericals published by Penguin Random House.

== Artistry and activism ==
Praised for her arsenal of technical skills, she "delivers in a commanding, often melismatic style that enchants." Reviews have compared her to "the teenaged Aretha Franklin" (Elle), noting her "impressive fearlessness" (Boston Globe), lauding her "pipes, presence [and] potential" (No Depression), and observing that "Ryder brings a range and vocal maturity of someone twice her age" (American Songwriter).

On August 11, 2018, Ryder was one of the artists invited to join Billy Talent for the #TorontoStrong benefit concert following the Danforth shooting on July 22, 2018. On April 4, 2018 Ryder received the Margaret Trudeau Mental Health Advocacy Award for her work with mental health. On October 19, 2019 Ryder joined the roster of artists who performed for the benefit concert Secret Path at Roy Thompson Hall. Secret Path is a recreation of the 2016 multimedia performance by the Tragically Hip's lead singer Gord Downie on the story of Chanie Wenjack, a 12-year-old Ojibwe boy who died while escaping a residential school in 1966. The proceeds go to promote reconciliation.

On September 29, 2021, Ryder joined the Canada's Walk of Fame as the recipient of the 2021 Allan Slaight Music Impact Honour for her benevolence in the music industry and mental wellness.

== Discography ==
=== Studio albums ===
Title	Details	Peak chart positions				Sales	Certifications
Title	Details	CAN	US	US Heat	US Rock	Sales	Certifications
Falling Out	Released: 1999; Label: Mime Radio; Format: CD	—	—	—	—		
Unlikely Emergency	Released: April 5, 2005; Label: Redbird; Format: CD	—	—	—	—		
If Your Memory Serves You Well	Released: November 14, 2006; Label: EMI Music Canada; Format: CD, digital download	—	—	—	—		MC: Gold
Is It O.K.	Released: November 11, 2008; Label: Atlantic; Format: CD, digital download	—	101	1	39		MC: Gold
Harmony	Released: November 27, 2012; Label: EMI Music Canada; Format: CD, Vinyl, digital download	11	—	12	—	CAN: 74,000	MC: Platinum
Utopia	Released: May 26, 2017; Label: Universal Music Canada; Format: Vinyl, CD, digital download	10	—	—	—	CAN: 74,000	MC: Platinum
Christmas Kisses	Released: October 19, 2018; Label: Serenadersource Inc./Universal Music Canada; Format: Vinyl, CD, digital download	—	—	—	—		
The Art of Falling Apart	Released: March 12, 2021; Label: Serenader Source Inc/ArtHaus/Warner Music Canada; Format: Vinyl, CD, digital download	—	—	—	—		

=== EPs ===
- Serena (1999)
- A Day at the Studio (2002)
- Told You in a Whispered Song (2007)
- Sweeping the Ashes (2008)
- Serena Ryder & the Beauties 12" Vinyl (2011)
- Electric Love (2017)

=== Live albums ===
- Live at the Market Hall (2002)
- Serena Ryder Live (2003)
- Live in Oz (2005)
- Live in South Carolina (2011)

=== Singles ===
Title	Year	Peak chart positions			Certifications	Album
Title	Year	CAN	CAN CHR	US Adult Pop	Certifications	Album
"Good Morning Starshine"	2006	84	—	—		If Your Memory Serves You Well
"Weak in the Knees"	2006	44	—	—	MC: Platinum	If Your Memory Serves You Well
"Calling to Say"	2007	40	—	—		Non-album single
"Little Bit of Red"	2008	82	—	—		Is It O.K.
"All for Love"	2008	—	—	29		Is It O.K.
"What I Wanna Know"	2009	—	—	—		Is It O.K.
"Broken Heart Sun" (with Melissa Etheridge)	2011	—	—	—		Live
"Stompa"	2012	8	9	34	MC: 3× Platinum	Harmony
"What I Wouldn't Do"	2013	8	8	—	MC: Platinum	Harmony
"Mary Go Round"	2013	—	—	—		Harmony
"Fall"	2013	27	21	—		Harmony
"Heavy Love"	2014	56	39	—		Harmony
"Together We Are One"	2015	—	—	—		Non-album single
"Got Your Number"	2016	62	19	—	MC: Gold	Utopia
"Electric Love"	2017	—	26	—		Utopia
"Utopia"	2017	—	—	—		Utopia
"Ice Age"	2017	—	—	—		Utopia
"Be the Ones"	2018	—	—	—		Non-album singles
"Famous" (featuring Simon Ward)	2018	—	—	—		Non-album singles
"Christmas Kisses"	2018	—	—	—		Christmas Kisses
"Candy"	2020	—	—	—		The Art of Falling Apart
"Waterfall"	2020	—	—	—		The Art of Falling Apart
"Kid Gloves"	2020	—	—	—		The Art of Falling Apart
"Better Now"	2021	—	—	—		The Art of Falling Apart
"Lily"	2026					as Fern McArthur

== Duets ==
No.	Title	Writer(s)	Producer(s)	Length
1.	"Bodies and Minds" (with Great Lake Swimmers), (Lost Channels, 2005)	Tony Dekker		3:48
2.	"Your Rocky Spine" (with Great Lake Swimmers), (Ongiara, 2007)	Tony Dekker		3:36
3.	"That's No Way To Say Goodbye" (with Adam Cohen), 2008)	Leonard Cohen		4:06
4.	"Heart of Gold" (with Lior), 2008)	Neil Young		3:17
5.	"Everything is Moving So Fast" (with Great Lake Swimmers), (The Legion Sessions, 2009)	Tony Dekker		4:09
6.	"So Ready" (with Milosh Pfisterer), 2009)	Mike Milosh		4:33
7.	"You Can Always Come Home" (with Jason Castro), (Love Uncompromised, 2009)	Stephen William Fiore		3:19
8.	"Stones Under Rushing Water" (with NEEDTOBREATHE), (The Outsiders, 2009)	Nathaniel Rineheart; William Rineheart		3:19
9.	"Lonely In Columbus" (with Stephen Kellogg and the Sixers), (The Bear, 2010)	Tony Dekker		4:23
10.	"Walk That Way" (with Jimmy Rankin), (Forget About The World, 2011)	Jimmy Rankin; Christina Martin; Dwight D'eon		3:38
11.	"Broken Heart Sun" (with Melissa Etheridge, 2011)	John Shanks		3:33
12.	"My Heart Has Wings" (with Aengus Finnan) (North Wind, 2011)	Aengus Finnan		4:25
13.	"Black Sheep" (with Blackie and the Rodeo Kings) (Kings and Queens, 2011)	Stephen Fearing		3:05
14.	"If I Can't Have You" (with Blackie and the Rodeo Kings) (Kings and Queens, 2011)	Stephen Fearing		5:28
15.	"Walking On Water" (with Johnny Reid) (Fire It Up, 2012)	Marty Dodson; Alan Frew; Johnny Reid		3:45
16.	"All Over Again" (with Jerry Leger) (Some Folks Know, 2012)	Jerry Leger; Serena Ryder	Tim Bovaconti	3:04
17.	"Beat This Heart" (with Tim Chaisson) (The Other Side, 2012)	Tim Chaisson		3:01
18.	"When You Know" (with Matt Epp) (Learning to Lose Control, 2013)	Matt Epp; Serena Ryder		4:20
19.	"Heart of Gold" (with Gord Downie), 2013)	Neil Young		3:17
20.	"I'm Alive" (with Michael Franti & Spearhead), 2013)	Michael Franti		3:43
21.	"Uh-Oh" (with Jeremy Fisher) (The Lemon Squeeze, 2014)	Jeremy Fisher		3:24
22.	"In The Morning" (with The Trews) (The Trews, 2014)	Colin Macdonald; Serena Ryder		4:33
23.	"To Love Somebody" (with Bobby Bazini) (Where I Belong, 2014)	Barry Gibb; Robin Gibb		5:01
24.	"Counting Stars" (with OneRepublic), 2014)	Ryan Tedder		5:01
25.	"Hard Love" (with NEEDTOBREATHE) (Hard Love, 2016)	Nathaniel Rineheart; William Rineheart		3:24
26.	"Happy Xmas (War is Over)" (with Shawn Hook) 2017)	John Lennon; Yoko Ono		3:05
27.	"Famous" (with Simon Ward), 2018)	Serena Ryder	Dave Cobb	4:18
28.	"Walk In The Park" (with Colin Macdonald), 2018)	Serena Ryder		3:05
29.	"What I Wouldn't Do" (with Brett Kissel), 2018)	Serena Ryder; Jerrod Bettis	Jerrod Bettis	3:39
30.	"Mary Go Round" (with Melissa Etheridge), 2019)	Serena Ryder; Jeff Copland		3:39
31.	"The Spark" (with William Prince), 2021)	William Prince		3:56
32.	"River of Tears" (with William Prince, 2021)	Serena Ryder; Maia Davies		3:39
33.	"The Swimmer (To Be An Old Man)" (with Rose Cousins, 2022)	Rose Cousins		4:08
34.	"Better Now" (with Steve Earle, 2022)	Steve Earle		3:24
