= The Pets =

The Pets may refer to:

- The Pets (1950s band)
- The Pets (2000s band)

== See also ==
- Els Pets, a Catalan pop rock band
