= Podsdarapomuk =

- Origin: Winnenden, Germany
- Genres: art rock, alternative rock, experimental rock, progressive rock, jazz fusion
- Years active: 1993–2000
- Past members: Thorsten Pachur; Claas Sandbothe; Daniel Klemm; Christian Schmidt; Lars Puder; Jan Pfennig
- Website: www.podsdarapomuk.de podsdarapomuk.bandcamp.com

Podsdarapomuk was a German experimental rock band active between 1993 and 1999, noted for its complex music and its associations with diverse late-1990s London music scenes (including Asian Underground and math rock).

== Music ==
Podsdarapomuk's music was an angular, guitar-heavy mixture of art rock, jazz-fusion and hardcore, with occasional use of flute (played by guest performers) and tapes; on at least one occasion the band augmented a composition with a blistering John Coltrane saxophone solo sampled from an album. Most of the band's material was written by guitarist Thorsten Pachur, with additional contributions by other members – in particular Daniel Klemm, who sometimes wrote songs of his own. Klemm was also responsible for the band's expressionistic lyrics, which were written and sung in English.

Progression magazine described Podsdarapomuk's work as "strange, angular, complex melodies, dissonant Bartókian chords and a loose, yet controlled sense of ensemble that gives the effect of being at once tightly arranged, yet spontaneous." Conversely, Melody Maker reviewed one EP: "There's some experimentation going on here. Trouble is, it sounds like everyone's experimenting with something different. The drummer's doing a Krautrock thang, while your guitarist is on a decidedly math-rock kick. What's the singer's up to is anyone's guess, although it's probably fair to say he's experimenting with the art of singing over something which proves that very feat impossible."

Podsdarapomuk cited a diverse set of bands and musicians as influences, including Mr. Bungle, John McLaughlin, John Zorn’s Naked City, The Police, Squarepusher, Led Zeppelin and The Beatles). They were, in turn, compared in various press reviews to NoMeansNo, King Crimson, Gentle Giant, dEUS, various post-punk and Rock in Opposition bands (including Die Haut, Kultivator, Zamla Mammaz, Public Image Ltd, Manna and Kraldjursanstalten) and even the trip hop band Portishead.

== History ==
Podsdarapomuk was formed in Winnenden, Germany by guitarist Thorsten Pachur, drummer Claas Sandbothe, singer Daniel Klemm and two members of the Winnenden “deep soul” band Doctor Wutzdog (keyboard player-turned-guitarist Christian Schmidt and bass guitarist Lars Puder). The band's first performance was on December 16, 1993, and for the next two years the band played throughout Germany and Austria, sharing the stage with bands such as The Perotic Theatre, Metabolismus, The Darwins and Summerland Moonfield. Podsdarapomuk's eponymous debut cassette EP, released in 1994, included the first recording of "A Dream And Rage In A Cage", a track which would become the band's signature song (appearing on three of their four EPs). The follow-up EP - 1995's On Pasewolk Again, continued to refine the band's sound.

Wishing to make their music better known, all five members of Podsdarapomuk relocated to London with Schmidt and Puder finally leaving Doctor Wutzdog in order to make the move. Podsdarapomuk played their first London concert at the Rock Garden on July 6, 1996, and quickly found an audience within the London math rock and alt.prog scenes of the mid-1990s. While in London, the band members took advantage of the opportunities offered to see and learn from resident and visiting rock and jazz musicians. They also investigated dance-club culture (in particular Sandbothe, who took lessons from Asian Underground figurehead Talvin Singh and frequently attended the Anokha Club). The band's next EP (1997's Arkoona Voula: Troozo) reflected many of these influences, while remaining true to the established Podsdarapomuk sound.

While in London, Podsdarapomuk drew attention from the body of music fans surrounding the cult British band Cardiacs, and played regularly with bands such as Billy Mahonie, the Pets, the Shrubbies and the Monsoon Bassoon. However, the band remained unable to move beyond being a cult act playing small venues and in terms of press coverage were predominantly written about by small-press magazines and fanzines specializing in diverse rock music (such as Expose, Organ Audion, Tarkus and Misfit City).

Deciding that another relocation was necessary, the members of Podsdarapomuk left London in late 1997 to move to Berlin. Shortly after arriving, Sandbothe developed tendinitis. With their drummer out of action the group temporarily dissolved, with each member pursuing musical studies and experimentation. Upon Sandbothe's recovery Podsdarapomuk reunited, but disagreements between him and the others led to his replacement as drummer with Jan Pfennig (aka Jan Kincade). The new lineup of the band recorded Podsdarapomuk's final EP (the self-titled Podsdarapomuk), which featured a new version of "Dream And Rage In A Cage". For this EP, the band opted for a more straightforward rock approach driven by Pfennig's more-direct drumming style. Between December 1998 and November 1999 Podsdarapomuk played six concerts in Berlin, but failed to gain broader public acceptance. The band split up amicably at the end of the year. A double-CD collection of the group's EP tracks and demos (Plasyr De La Zkratsh) was released in 2000.

Following the Podsdarapomuk split, Christian Schmidt and Lars Puder returned to Winnenden and reformed Doctor Wutzdog, which continues to play; Daniel Klemm frequently makes guest appearances with the band. Podsdarapomuk's main composer Thorsten Pachur began a new Berlin-based career as a psychologist (working at the Center for Adaptive Behavior and Cognition at the Max Planck Institute for Human Development) but also continued his involvement with music via his experimental electronica project Monologik. Pachur also maintained his musical partnership with Klemm via the Berlin-based trio Monroe (the third member being double-bass player Nathan Berg).

Podsdarapomuk's original drummer Claas Sandbothe maintained his connection with club culture, expanding his activities internationally. Having worked with the Leloneks Reflections Band, Duo Oxygen (with bass player Armin Metz of CCM) and the multicultural ragga/hip-hop/drum and bass band Culture Clash, he currently produces world music/breakbeat fusion under the name of DJ Dba. His replacement in Podsdarapomuk, Jan Pfennig, went on to drum for Human Sampler under his other name of Jan Kincade.

== Personnel ==
- Thorsten Pachur - guitar
- Daniel Klemm - vocals
- Christian Schmidt - guitar
- Lars Puder - bass guitar
- Claas Sandbothe - drums (1993–1998)
- Jan Pfennig - drums (1998–1999)

== Discography ==
- Podsdarapomuk cassette EP, 1994
- On Pasewolk Again CD EP, 1995
- Arkuna Voola: Troozo cassette EP, 1997
- Podsdarapomuk CD EP, 1999 (completely different recording from the 1994 cassette EP)
- Plasyr De La Zkratsh CD double album, 2000 (compiles all material from the three EPs plus unreleased tracks)
