= Matt Epp =

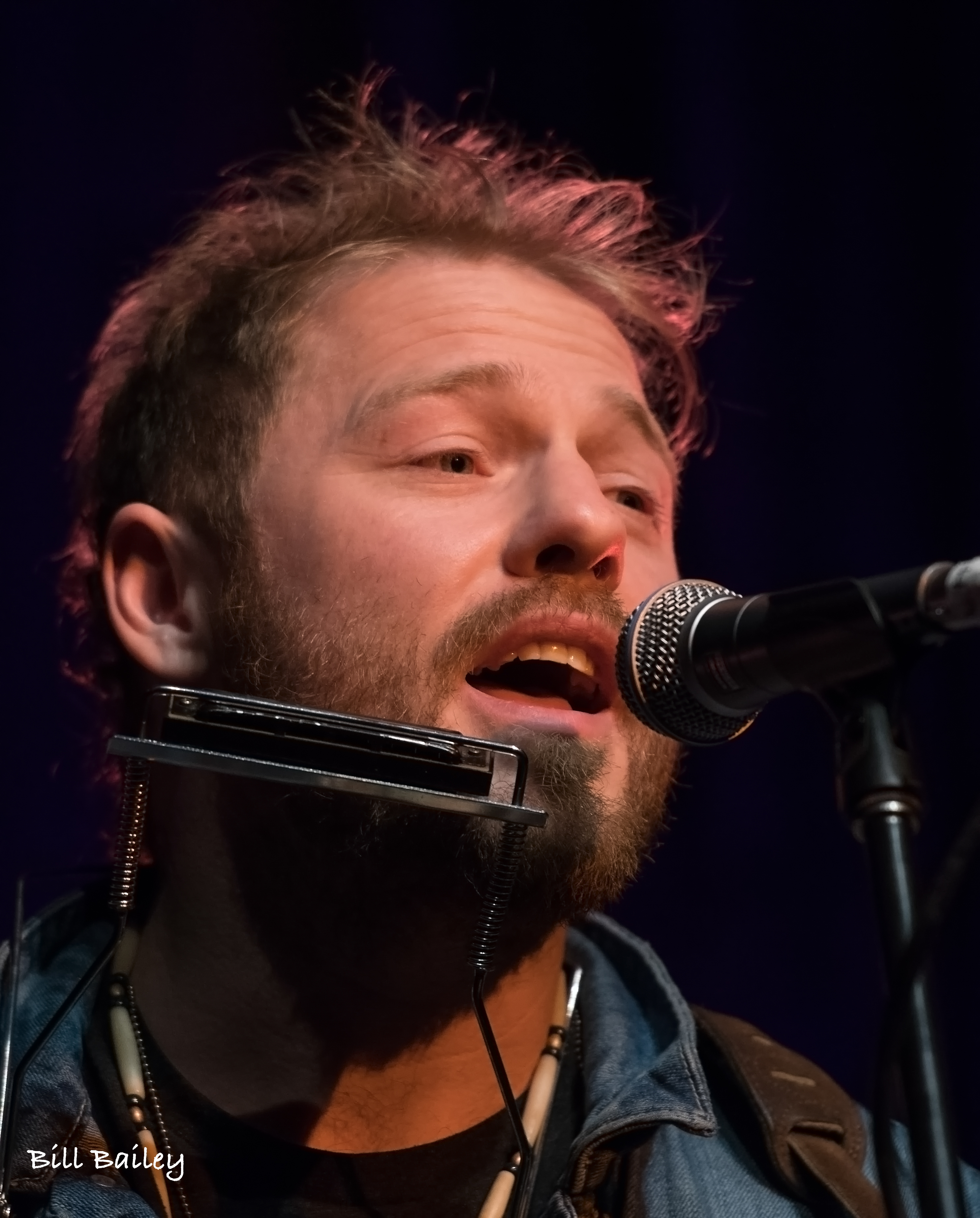
- Matt Epp, February 2017

Background information
- Born: November 25, 1980 (age 45)
- Genres: Rock, roots, soul
- Instruments: Guitar, harmonica, piano
- Years active: 2005–present
- Label: Independent
- Formerly of: Matt Epp & the Amorian Assembly
- Website: www.mattepp.com

Matt Epp (born November 25, 1980) is a Canadian singer-songwriter from Winnipeg, Manitoba. He has released several albums and collaborated with artists like Eliza Gilkyson, Rose Cousins, Serena Ryder and Amelia Curran, among others.

== Early life ==
Epp was born in 1980 in Crystal City, Manitoba, and moved around southern Manitoba until attending high school in Steinbach, where he started his first band with future The Waking Eyes drummer Stephen Senkiw and graduated from the Steinbach Regional Secondary School.

== Solo career ==
Epp released You'll Find Me Alone in 2005, followed by Love in Such Strong Words in 2006. Extensive touring, and a radio hit in the single "My Love Will Come", brought Epp international attention in 2008, following the release of Orphan Horse, his third album. Orphan Horse was given an A+ by Uptown Magazine.

Safe or Free, released in 2009, included collaborations with Eliza Gilkyson, Jesse DeNatale and Amelia Curran. It was listed as one of the top ten albums of the year by a number of Canadian folk magazine Penguin Eggs expert panelists in their 2009 Year in Review edition. He released his first official video, for revenge murder ballad "They Won't Find the Bodies".

In 2010, Epp was nominated for Singer-Songwriter Discovery of the Year on Sirius Radio's popular The Coffee House program, for whom he performed in their New York studios. He continued to tour Europe and North America extensively, and played at various festivals, including the Vancouver Folk Music Festival. Epp was also spotlighted on Spanish television in 2010 and had a song included alongside songs by Fred Penner and others on a charity album of children's music.

Matt Epp was the May 2011 artist for Sirius' Backstage Pass series. A short interview and clip segment on him ran before every Cineplex movie screening in Canada for the month.

April 2011 was also Epp's first period of work with his backing band, The Amorian Assembly. Together they recorded and released their debut, At Dawn. In 2012 they temporarily relocated to Spain where they worked on their follow-up album.

In 2012, Epp lived in Granada, Spain, continuing to tour Europe with highlights including playing Germany's Edenkoben Guitar Festival, and making a new solo acoustic album Never Have I Loved Like This on Peter Finger's Acoustic Music Records label. Never Have I Loved Like This was released in Germany on September 7, 2012.

November 2012 saw Matt Epp on his first international magazine cover, for the German guitar magazine, Akustik Gitarre.

Matt Epp & the Amorian Assembly's album, Learning To Lose Control, was released on June 4, 2013. The single "When You Know" entered the CBC Radio 2 Top 20 chart on August 16, 2013 and remained in the top 5 there for the next 12 weeks. When You Know was then nominated as co-written song in the Juno Awards of 2014 as part of Serena Ryder's Juno Award for Songwriter of the Year.

== Amorian Assembly ==
In 2010, Epp formed the Amorian Assembly with Antonio Lomas, drummer from the successful Spanish band Lori Meyers, and Joel Couture, a Franco Manitoban bassist. Their first album, At Dawn, was released in April 2011. It features collaborations with Bahamas and Rose Cousins.

While Epp and the Amorian Assembly were living in Granada in the spring of 2012, Epp did a crowd-funding project that raised its goal of $20,000 towards the recording of their second album together. They began recording in Granada and at a studio in Las Alpujarras mountain range in Andalucia, and they finished recording in Los Angeles, California, with record producer Jamie Candiloro. This album was released in June 2013, and featured Imaginary Cities lead singer Marti Sarbit on several tracks, as well as a duet with Serena Ryder called "When You Know".

== Discography ==
- You'll Find Me Alone, 2005
- Love in Such Strong Words, 2006
- Orphan Horse, 2008
- Safe or Free, 2009
- At Dawn (as Matt Epp and the Amorian Assembly), 2011
- Valentine (Single), 2012
- Never Have I Loved Like This (Germany release only, on Acoustic Music Records), 2012
- Learning to Lose Control (as Matt Epp and the Amorian Assembly), 2013
- Luma, 2014
- Ready in Time, 2015
- The Sound (Single), 2016
- Shadowlands, 2018
- You Were Chosen to Be Here (with Isaac Murdoch), 2021
- Rolling Wave, 2023
