= If Your Memory Serves You Well =

Album by Serena Ryder

Studio album by Serena Ryder
- Released: November 14, 2006
- Genre: Alternative pop
- Label: EMI Music Canada

Serena Ryder chronology
Unlikely Emergency (2005)	If Your Memory Serves You Well (2006)	Is It O.K. (2008)

If Your Memory Serves You Well is the second major label album by Canadian singer-songwriter Serena Ryder, released on November 14, 2006, on EMI Music Canada. The album is primarily a collection of covers of classic songs by Canadian songwriters, although it also includes three original songs by Ryder. Two singles have been produced from the album: "Weak in the Knees" and "Just Another Day".

In Canada, the album was certified gold on November 5, 2007. The single "Weak in the Knees" was certified gold digital download on January 25, 2012.

== Track listing ==
1. "Sisters of Mercy" (Cohen)
2. "Good Morning Starshine" (MacDermot/Rado/Ragni)
3. "This Wheel's on Fire" (Danko/Dylan)
4. "My Heart Cries for You" (Sigman/Faith)
5. "Some of These Days" (Brooks)
6. "Quand les hommes vivront d'amour" (Lévesque)
7. "It Doesn't Matter Anymore" (Anka)
8. "(Take Me for a Walk in the) Morning Dew" (Dobson)
9. "Boo Hoo" (Heyman/Loeb/Lombardo)
10. "Coconut Grove" (Sebastian/Yanovsky)
11. "You Were on My Mind" (Fricker)
12. "Last Night I Had the Strangest Dream" (McCurdy)
13. "Weak in the Knees" (Ryder)
14. "Out of the Blue" (Ryder/Bachman)
15. "Just Another Day" (Ryder)
