= Video Sound =

Studio album by The Waking Eyes
- Released: 2004
- Recorded: 2004
- Genre: Rock
- Length: 37:53
- Label: Warner Music Canada
- Producer: Arnold Lanni

The Waking Eyes chronology
Combing the Clouds (2002)	Video Sound (2004)	Holding on to Whatever it Is (2008)

Video Sound is the second release of the Canadian rock band The Waking Eyes. The album was produced by Arnold Lanni who is known for his work with many Canadian bands such as Our Lady Peace, Simple Plan, Thousand Foot Krutch and Finger Eleven.

== Tracks ==
All songs written by The Waking Eyes

1. "Watch Your Money"
2. "Beginning"
3. "Move On"
4. "On A Train"
5. "Headlights"
6. "Waiting"
7. "Takin’ The Hard Way"
8. "More Than What You’re Given"
9. "But I Already Have It"
10. "Get Up Easy"
11. "If You Know Why"

== Personnel ==
- Matt Peters - Lead vocals, guitar, and keyboard
- Russ Doerksen - Bass
- Steve Senkiw - Drums
- Rusty Matyas - Guitar, backing vocals
