= Unlikely Emergency =

Studio album by Serena Ryder
- Released: April 5, 2005
- Genre: Alternative pop
- Length: 33:23
- Label: Redbird Records
- Producer: Hawksley Workman

Serena Ryder chronology
Serena Ryder Live (2003)	Unlikely Emergency (2005)	If Your Memory Serves You Well (2006)

Professional ratings
Review scores
Source	Rating
Allmusic	4/5 stars

Unlikely Emergency is the breakout album by Serena Ryder, released April 5, 2005.

In 2009, the song "Sing, Sing" was selected for Music Monday, a special event to highlight music education in Canada which saw nearly two million Canadian schoolchildren singing the song in class on May 5.

== Track listing ==
1. "Sing Sing" 0:39
2. "Just Another Day" 3:59
3. "Again by You" 3:39
4. "Every Single Day" 3:42
5. "And Some Money Too" 4:16
6. "Skin Crawl" 3:50
7. "Daydream" 3:41
8. "Stay for an Hour" 3:29
9. "Unlikely Emergency" 3:58
10. "At Last" 2:10

All songs by Serena Ryder except "At Last": Gordon/Warren

== Credits ==
- Serena Ryder - Vocals/Electric Guitar/Acoustic Guitar
- Hawksley Workman - Banjo/Electric Guitars/Hands and Feet/Drums
- Derrick Brady - Bass
- Todd Lumley - Piano/Organ
- James Paul - Mixing (Rogue Studios)
- Phil Demetro - Mastering (The Lacquer Channel)
- Wade Gilpin - Layout and Design
