= Holding On to Whatever It Is =

Studio album by The Waking Eyes
- Released: November 4, 2008
- Genre: Indie rock
- Label: Warner Music Canada
- Producer: John Paul Peters

The Waking Eyes chronology
Video Sound (2004)	Holding On to Whatever It Is (2008)

Professional ratings
Review scores
Source	Rating
ChartAttack	4/5 stars

Holding On to Whatever It Is is an album by The Waking Eyes, released in 2008.

It was released on July 1, 2008 on iTunes, and a physical CD was released in stores on November 4, 2008.

== Track listing ==
1. "Holding On To Whatever It Is"
2. "Get Me to the Doctor"
3. "All Empires Fall"
4. "Wolves at the Door"
5. "Clap Clap"
6. "Keeps Me Coming Back"
7. "Masters of Deception"
8. "Boyz and Girlz"
9. "Pick Up Yer Number"
10. "Trouble on the Patio"
11. "Run Through the Fire"
12. "Digital Glue"

== Personnel ==
- Rusty Matyas - Vocals (lead on 2,4,6,7,9,12), Guitars, Keyboards, Trumpet
- Joey Penner - Bass, Percussion, Harmonica, Backing Vocals
- Matt Peters - Vocals (lead on 1,3,5,6,8,10,11), Keyboards, Guitars
- Steve Senkiw - Drums, Percussion, Backing Vocals
- Scott Stewart - Harmonica Guitar on 12
- The Waking Eyes - Production
- John Paul Peters - Production, Recording Engineer, Mix Engineer, Violin on 1 and 12
- Neil Cameron - Additional Recording Engineer, Mix Engineer
- Phil Demetro - Mastering
- Chris Peters - Art Design and Artwork
- Joshua Ruth - Band Photography
- Alek Rzeszowski - Layout
