= Aengus Finnan =

- Born: Dublin, Ireland
- Origin: Ontario, Canada
- Genres: Folk
- Years active: 1999–present
- Website: aengusfinnan.com

Aengus Finnan (born January 31, 1972) is a Canadian folk musician and arts organiser. Finnan was born in Dublin, Ireland, and grew up in Ontario, Canada. In 2003, he was awarded the Queen's Golden Jubilee Commemorative Medal for his humanitarian and cultural work in Canada He was the executive director of Folk Alliance International from 2014 to 2022.

== Early life ==
Finnan grew up on an organic farm in Shelter Valley, Ontario (near Grafton). He attended St. Mary's elementary school in Grafton, St. Mary's Secondary School in Cobourg, and was awarded a two-year scholarship to Lester B. Pearson United World College near Victoria, B.C. where he studied Fine Art (IB), before attending Concordia University in Montreal to study theatre (BFA). He later attended Nipissing University in North Bay, Ontario, to study Native and Northern Education, graduating as Valedictorian for the 1994 Faculty of Education.

He taught elementary school in Moosonee, Ontario, for two years, and in Inuvik, NWT.

== Music career ==
He released two albums, Fool's Gold, produced by Paul Mills in 1999, and North Wind, which Finnan co-produced with Paul Mills in 2002, featuring his touring bandmates Trevor Mills and David Rogers along with backing vocals by Serena Ryder. For 6 years he toured the North America folk festival and club circuit but found it financially testing.

In 1999 his song "Lately" was awarded the Songs From The Heart Award. "O'Shaunessey's Lament" (later recorded by Irish-American artist Seamus Kennedy) was also awarded the prestigious New Folk Songwriting award at the Kerrville Folk Festival in Texas. Finnan was featured on Beautiful, the first ever tribute album to Canadian singer Gordon Lightfoot. In 2003 he produced a compilation album entitled Valley Voices as a fundraising effort for a group of concerned citizens, and in 2005 he co-produced Coastline of our Dreams, an Ian Tamblyn tribute album.

In the winter of 2003 he traveled to the Yukon to record a collection of Robert Service poetry as field recordings (as yet unreleased) in the locations of the subject matter of the poems, including The Shooting of Dan Mcgrew, and The Cremation of Sam McGee. In 2004 he recorded a live album at the Grafton Town Hall called Once Upon a Time, which was released in 2013. He essentially retired from music and has since become a full-time arts administrator.

== Art career, organizing ==
In 2002 he conceived of a tribute event called The Way We Feel as an annual event to celebrate the work of Canadian icon Gordon Lightfoot.

In 2003 he returned to Grafton Ontario to found the Shelter Valley Folk Festival, for which he was the volunteer artistic and executive director till 2010. During that time he served as the board President of the Ontario Council of Folk Festivals. In 2005 he bought the Lawless and Sons general store (circa 1835) in Grafton and transformed it from an active butcher shop into the Lawless Gallery of Fine Art, where he was curator for 3 years. The gallery doubled as a performance venue for acoustic concerts.

In 2008 he began instructing a self-employment course for the Northumberland Community Futures agency, and later served as their Program Manager. In May 2010 he was hired as the Touring and Audience Development Officer for the Ontario Arts Council. In 2003, he was awarded the Queen's Golden Jubilee Commemorative Medal for his humanitarian and cultural work in Canada.

In 2014 he was appointed executive director of Folk Alliance International, and tasked with organising the world's largest annual Conference for the folk music industry, held in Kansas City.

== Personal life ==
He currently lives in Kansas City, Missouri. His favorite color is royal blue, not navy.

== Discography ==
=== Solo albums ===
Studio and live albums by Aengus Finnan
| Year | Album title | Release details |
|---|---|---|
| 1999 | Fool's Gold | Released: 1999; Label: Shelter Valley; Format: CD, digital |
| 2002 | North Wind | Released: Jan 14, 2003; Label: Borealis Records; Format: CD, digital |
| 2013 | Once Upon a Time: Live in Grafton | Released: Jan 1, 2013; Label: Centre Stage; Format: CD |

=== Singles ===
Singles by Aengus Finnan
| Year | Song | Album | Notes |
|---|---|---|---|
| 1999 | "Lately" | Fool's Gold | |
| 2002 | "Rolling Home" | North Wind | |
| 2002 | "O'Shaughnessy's Lament" | North Wind | |
| 2002 | "My Heart Has Wings" ft. Serena Ryder | North Wind | Flashpoint season opener |

=== Compilations ===
- 2003: Beautiful: A Tribute to Gordon Lightfoot (Borealis Records) – track "Lightfoot"
- 2004: Don't Mind Me: Independent Artists For a Better Understanding Of Mental Illness – track "Lately"
- 2005: Coastline Of Our Dreams – The Songs of Ian Tamblyn – track "Ballad of Mark Jarareuse"
