= Is It O.K. =

Studio album by Serena Ryder
- Released: November 11, 2008
- Genre: Pop
- Length: 50:41
- Label: Atlantic Records
- Producer: John Alagia

Serena Ryder chronology
If Your Memory Serves You Well (2006)	Is It O.K. (2008)	Harmony (2012)

Professional ratings
Review scores
Source	Rating
Allmusic	4/5 stars

Is It O.K. is the third major label album by Canadian singer-songwriter Serena Ryder. The album was released on November 11, 2008, in Canada. The singles for this album are "Little Bit of Red", "All for Love", and "What I Wanna Know". The album won Adult Alternative Album of the Year at the 2009 Juno Awards.

This album was certified gold on April 22, 2009.

== Track listing ==
All music is composed by John Alagía

is it o.k track listing
No.	Title	Writer(s)	Length
1.	"Sweeping the Ashes"	Serena Ryder	4:42
2.	"Little Bit of Red"	Ryder; Dave Bassett	3:30
3.	"Brand New Love"	Ryder	3:51
4.	"Hiding Places"	Ryder	4:00
5.	"Blown Like the Wind at Night"	Ryder; Jeen O'Brien	3:41
6.	"All for Love"	Ryder; John Alagía; Steve McEwan	3:57
7.	"Weak in the Knees"	Ryder	3:40
8.	"Stumbling Over You"	Ryder; Mikal Blue	3:32
9.	"Why Can't I Love You"	Ryder; Brian Howes	3:53
10.	"Truth"	Ryder	3:43
11.	"Is It O.K"	Ryder; Blue	3:44
12.	"What I Wanna Know"	Ryder; Jim Duguid	3:50
13.	"Dark as the Black"	Ryder	4:38
Total length:			50:41

CD ROM/multimedia bonus track
No.	Title	Length
14.	"All Up to You"	2:54
Total length:		53:35

All music is composed by Kevin Drew

Deluxe edition bonus tracks
No.	Title	Writer(s)	Length
14.	"Racing in the Street" (Acoustic Cover Version)	Bruce Springsteen	4:12
15.	"No Air" (featuring The Beauties)	James Fauntleroy II; Erik "Blu2th" Griggs; Harvey Mason Jr.; Damon Thomas; Steve Russell	3:34
16.	"The Funeral" (featuring The Beauties)	Ben Bridwell; Mat Brooke; Chris Early; Tim Meinig	6:38
18.	"Slow" (featuring The Beauties)	Dan Carey; Emilíana Torrini; Kylie Minogue	2:56
Total length:			1:08:01

=== Notes ===
- All tracks are stylized in all lowercase.

== Personnel ==
- John Alagia – acoustic guitar (tracks 5, 6, 8, 9, and 12), electric guitar (tracks:1, 3, 7, 9, 11, and 12), backing vocals (tracks 1, 4, 8, and 12)
- Matt Chamberlain – drums, percussion, loops(tracks: 3, 7, 11, and 12)
- Mark Goldenberg – electric guitar (tracks: 3, 4, 6, 7, 8, and 12)
- Sean Hurley – bass
- Zac Rae – keyboards, glockenspiel (tracks 3 and 12)
- Lyle Workman – electric guitar, banjo (tracks 1 and 12)
- Serena Ryder – acoustic guitar, vocals
