= Serena Ryder Live =

Live album by Serena Ryder
- Released: 2003
- Recorded: October 2002
- Genre: Pop
- Label: Auto-production
- Producer: Serena Ryder

Serena Ryder chronology
Falling Out (1999)	Serena Ryder Live (2003)	Unlikely Emergency (2004)

Serena Ryder Live is the debut live album by Ontario singer Serena Ryder, recorded in The Black Sheep Inn in Wakefield, Quebec, Canada, in October 2002 by Bill Stunt and mastered by James Paul at Rogue Studio. It was originally recorded for broadcast on the CBC Radio program, Bandwidth.

== Track listing ==
1. "Hiding Place"
2. "Rust Looks Like Wood"
3. "Winter Waltz"
4. "Fortune's Wheel"
5. "Easy Enough"
6. "Melancholy Blue"

== Credits ==
All songs written by Serena Ryder except track 2, written by Charlie Glasspool (SOCAN) and track 4, written by Dave Tough (SOCAN).
Recording: Bill Stunt
Mastering: James Paul, Rogue Studio
