= The Undecided =

Canadian pop punk band

- Origin: Steinbach, Manitoba, Canada
- Genres: Punk rock pop punk melodic hardcore skate punk
- Years active: 1994–2001
- Members: Matt Fast; Steve Dueck; John Paul Peters; Dan Thomas

The Undecided was a pop punk band from Steinbach, Manitoba, Canada.

== History ==
The Undecided formed as a punk band in 1994 with members singer Matt Fast, drummer Steve Dueck, John Paul Peters guitar and Mike Kehler. In 1996, they released a demo CD which they called Orange Album, and toured briefly before becoming inactive.

The group reformed in 1997 with bassist Dan Thomas. They signed with Rock label Tooth and Nail Records. They were the first Canadian group to be signed by Tooth and Nail. They released The Undecided in 1999, and toured in Canada and the US in support of the album. Copies of the band's previously released punk music were no longer being sold.

In April 2001, the band played a large concert at the Winnipeg arena. Later that year they released the album More to See.

Peters has gone on to produce records for other bands, including The Waking Eyes. Thomas was formerly a member of Gooch.
