= Jerry Leger =

Canadian singer-songwriter (born 1985)

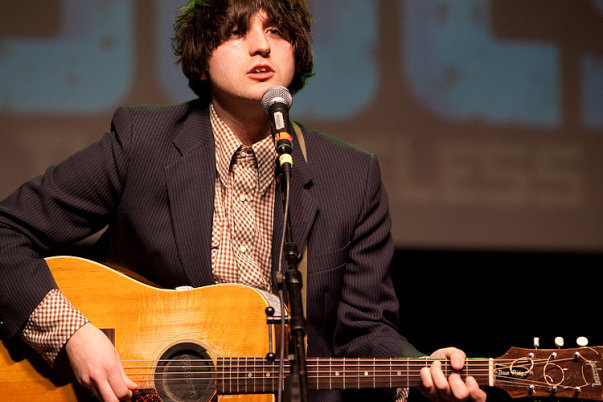
- Leger performing on Music City Roots hosted by Jim Lauderdale, Nashville, 2010.

Background information
- Born: April 19, 1985 (age 41); Toronto, Ontario, Canada
- Genres: folk, Roots Rock, Rock and Roll, Folk rock, Americana music
- Occupations: Musician, songwriter
- Instruments: Vocals, guitar, piano, harmonica
- Years active: 2003–present
- Label: Latent Recordings Warner Music Canada Fontana North Golden Rocket Proper Music Distribution Redeye Distribution
- Website: www.jerryleger.com

Jerry Leger is a Canadian singer-songwriter. Since 2005, he has released over 14 albums under his own name and more from various side projects. In 2020, Leger self-published a book of poetry titled Just The Night Birds. Longtime supporter, Ron Sexsmith says "Jerry Leger has that spark in him that all the great songwriters have. He's the real deal." Sexsmith has also guested on a couple of Leger's albums.

In 2013, Michael Timmins of Cowboy Junkies signed Leger to their label Latent Recordings. The label released his album Early Riser the following year to critical acclaim. The album received praise from publications such as PopMatters, Now (newspaper) and from Stuart Henderson in Exclaim! Commenting on Timmins' working with Leger, Henderson ended his review stating, "this is the man who, back in 1992, helped introduce a pretty obscure Texas singer-songwriter named Townes Van Zandt to Canadian audiences. Timmins knows singer-songwriters, is what I'm saying. In Leger, he's found one of Canada's best." Since Early Riser, Timmins has recorded, mixed and produced many of Leger's releases.

Leger's fifth album for Latent Recordings, Donlands (2023), produced by Mark Howard (producer) received critical acclaim, including an 8/10 rating in UK's Uncut Magazine and a 4/5 review in Rolling Stone Germany.

Leger has toured extensively across Canada, the United States, Europe and the UK, performing both as a headliner and opening act for artists such as Steve Earle, Ron Sexsmith, The Sadies, Jesse Winchester, Tift Merritt, Justin Townes Earle, Jim Cuddy, Trampled By Turtles, Dawes, Doug Paisley, among others.

Leger frequently works with his backing band, The Situation, which includes longtime members Kyle Sullivan on drums (since 2004) and Dan Mock on bass (since 2007).

In the March 2018 European edition of Rolling Stone magazine, Maik Brüggemeyer called Leger "One of the best Canadian songwriters."

== Discography ==
=== Albums ===
- 2005: Jerry Leger & the Situation (Independent, produced by Tim Bovaconti)
- 2006: Farewell Ghost Town (Independent, produced by Don Kerr & Tim Bovaconti)
- 2008: You, Me and the Horse (Golden Rocket Records, produced by Josh Finlayson of Skydiggers & Tim Bovaconti
- 2010: Traveling Grey (Golden Rocket Records, produced by Tim Bovaconti)
- 2011: The Good Old Days Are Back in Drag mini-album (Golden Rocket Records, no producer credited)
- 2012: Some Folks Know (Golden Rocket Records, produced by Tim Bovaconti)
- 2013: Live on Stage (Golden Rocket Records, no producer credited)
- 2014: Early Riser (Latent Recordings, produced by Michael Timmins)
- 2015: Crowd Pleaser (Golden Rocket Records, produced by "Hank Holly" - pseudonym for Jerry Leger) credited to The Del Fi's
- 2016: Don't Lose Your Beauty (Golden Rocket Records, produced by Hank Holly) - credited to The Bop Fi's
- 2017: Nonsense and Heartache (Latent Recordings, produced by Michael Timmins)
- 2018: Residuals (Golden Rocket Records, produced by Hank Holly) - credited to The Del Fi's
- 2019: Too Broke to Die: Retrospective 2005-2019 (Golden Rocket Records, compilation)
- 2019: Time Out for Tomorrow (Latent Recordings, produced by Michael Timmins)
- 2020: Songs from the Apartment (Golden Rocket Records, produced by Hank Holly)
- 2020: Halloween Music (Golden Rocket Records, produced by Jerry Leger) - credited to Hank Holly
- 2021: Street Anxiety (Golden Rocket Records, produced by Jerry Leger) - credited to Hank Holly
- 2021: The Apartment Show He Never Gave (Golden Rocket Records, produced by Hank Holly, soundtrack)
- 2022: Nothing Pressing (Latent Recordings, produced by Michael Timmins)
- 2023: Donlands (Latent Recordings, produced by Mark Howard)
- 2024: Why Should We Try Anymore - Jerry Leger sings Hank Williams (Golden Rocket Records, no producer credited)
- 2024: Can Con (Bobo Integral Records, produced by Hank Holly) - credited to The Psych Fi's
- 2025: Lucky Streak: Latent Lounge - Live From The Hangar (Produced by Michael Timmins)
- 2025: Waves Of Desire (DevilDuck Records, produced by Jerry Leger with Julian Müller)

=== Extended Plays ===
- 2023: Latent Uncovers (Latent Recordings, produced by Michael Timmins)
- 2023: The Time Flew By (Latent Recordings, produced by Michael Timmins)
- 2023: Live From Paradise (Latent Recordings, produced by Michael Timmins)
- 2024: Jerry Leger sings Hank Williams - selections from Why Should We Try Anymore limited edition 10" Vinyl record (Golden Rocket Records)

=== Singles ===
- 2015: Rusty but Workin split 7" with Graham Nicholas (produced by Aaron Comeau)
- 2020: Halfway 'Til Gone ft. Don Stevenson of Moby Grape (Golden Rocket Records, produced by Tim Bovaconti)
- 2021: Jumped in the Humber (Golden Rocket Records, produced by Michael Timmins)
- 2022: Christmas Without You / Father Christmas (song) (Latent Recordings, produced by Michael Timmins)
