= Rose Cousins =

Canadian folk-pop singer-songwriter (born 1977)

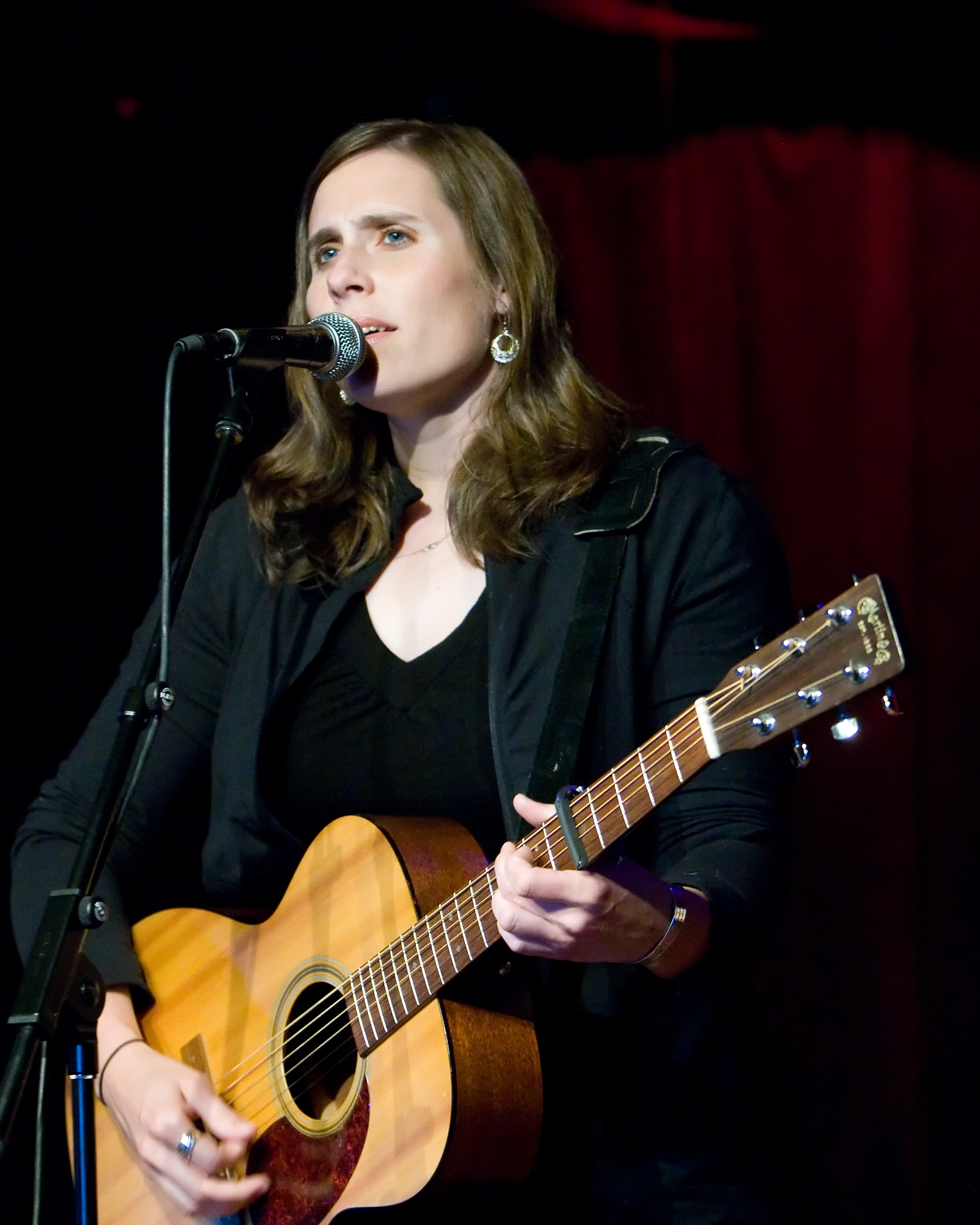
- Cousins live at High Noon Saloon Madison WI (2008)

Background information
- Born: Rosanne Millicent Cousins; April 21, 1977 (age 49); Prince Edward Island
- Origin: Canada
- Genre: Folk
- Occupations: Musician, singer-songwriter
- Instruments: Vocals, guitar, piano
- Years active: 2002–present
- Label: Old Farm Pony (self)
- Website: www.rosecousins.com

Rosanne Millicent "Rose" Cousins (born April 21, 1977) is a Canadian folk-pop singer-songwriter. Born and raised in Prince Edward Island, she is currently based in Halifax, Nova Scotia.

== Career ==
Cousins released two EPs prior to her full-length debut, If You Were for Me, in 2006. The album garnered her a nomination for best solo artist at the Canadian Folk Music Awards. She was also a winner in the 2007 Mountain Stage Newsong Contest, as well as winning best folk recording from both the Nova Scotia Music Awards and the PEI Music Awards, and Female Recording of the Year at the East Coast Music Awards in 2008.

She followed If You Were for Me with The Send Off in 2009. The Send Off was produced by Luke Doucet, and features guest musicians including Kathleen Edwards, Melissa McClelland, David Myles, Jenn Grant and Tom Wilson. Cousins was named contemporary singer of the year at the Canadian Folk Music Awards in 2010.

In 2012, she released We Have Made A Spark - for which she won a 2013 Juno Award. Produced by Zachariah Hickman and made with a group of friends in Boston Massachusetts including fellow songwriters Kris Delmhorstt, Mark Erelli, Rose Polenzani, Laura Cortese, Jennifer Kimball and instrumentalists Austin Nevins, Charlie Rose, Billy Beard and Sean Staples. A short film "If I Should Fall Behind" documented the making of the album and was screened by CBC and at select album release shows.

She released Stray Birds - a collection of covers and two new original songs - in September 2014.

Cousins has appeared as a guest musician on albums by Jenn Grant, Joel Plaskett, In-Flight Safety, Two Hours Traffic, Matt Mays, Catherine MacLellan, Jill Barber, Matt Epp, Old Man Luedecke, Ruth Minnikin, The Olympic Symphonium and Craig Cardiff, and she has performed live with Royal Wood, Mary Chapin Carpenter, John Gorka, and Ron Sexsmith.

Her latest album, Bravado, was released on February 21, 2020, via Outside Music. The album was preceded by the lead single "The Benefits of Being Alone", as well as by an EP that included that song, two other tracks from the album and a non-album cover of Prince's "I Would Die 4 U".

In 2021, Cousins released a new re-recording of "The Lullaby (My Oldest Love)", a song which she had recorded and performed solo on Bravado, as a duet with Tim Baker.

In 2025 she contributed a cover of Joel Plaskett's "Nothing More to Say" to the Plaskett tribute album Songs from the Gang.

== Awards ==
Cousins won a Canadian Folk Music Award for Contemporary Singer of the Year in 2012, and her 2012 CD We Have Made a Spark won the 2013 Juno Award as best Solo Roots & Traditional Album of the Year. Cousins' 2017 album Natural Conclusion was nominated for a 2018 Grammy Award. Cousins won a second JUNO award in 2021 for Contemporary Roots Album of the Year with her release 'Bravado'.

== Discography ==
- Only So Long (2002, EP)
- Miles to Go (2003, EP)
- Live at Ginger's on Barrington Street (2003, with Craig Cardiff)
- If You Were for Me (2006)
- The Send Off (2009)
- We Have Made a Spark (2012)
- Stray Birds (2014, EP)
- Natural Conclusion (2017)
- Bravado (2020)
- Conditions of Love - Vol 1 (2025)
