= Craig Cardiff =

Canadian singer

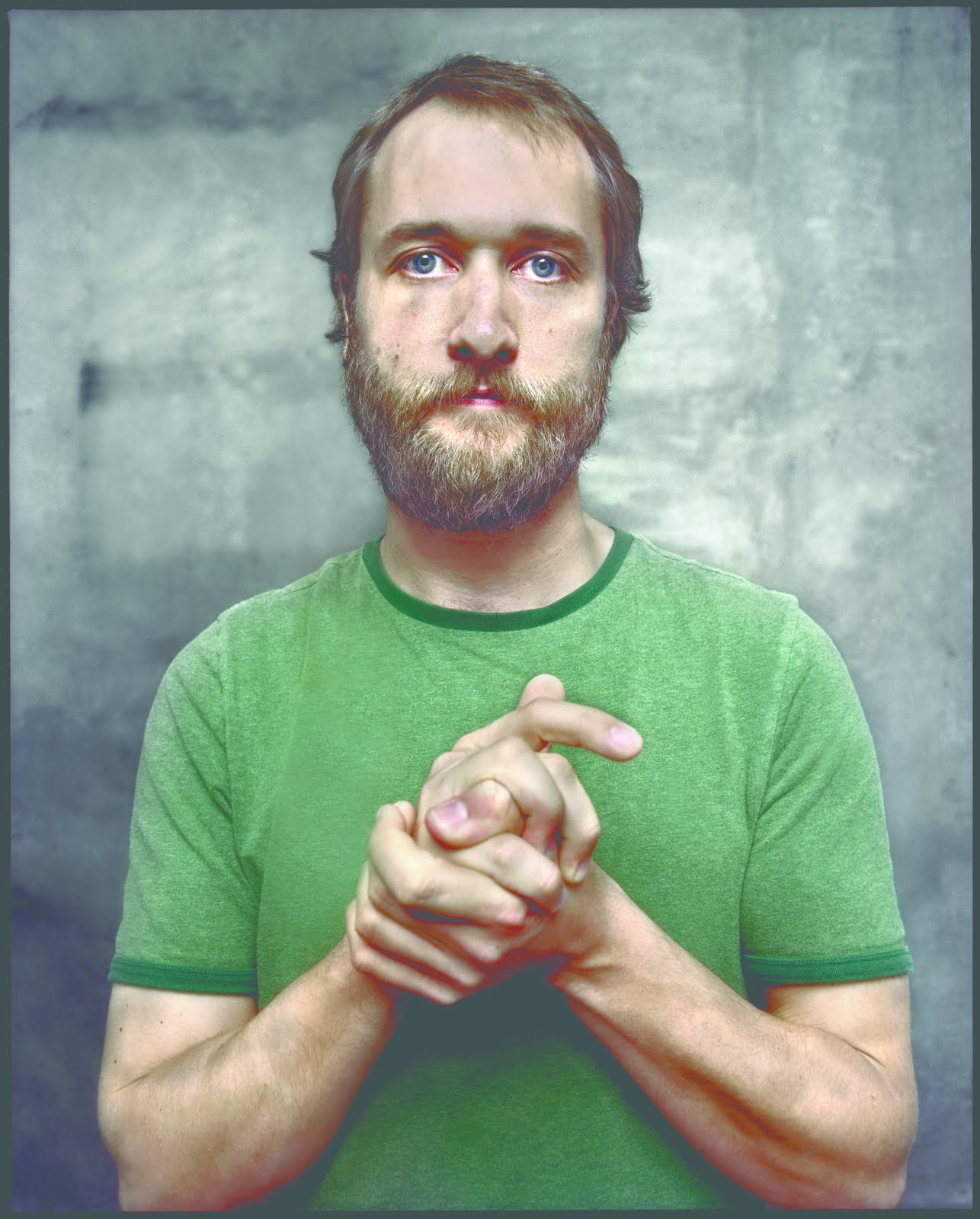
- photo by Kathy Roussel

Background information
- Born: Craig Cardiff; 9 July 1976 (age 50); Waterloo, Ontario
- Genres: folk, roots
- Instruments: Vocals, guitar, harmonica, looper
- Label: Antifragile Music
- Website: craigcardiff.com

Craig Cardiff (born 9 July 1976) is a Canadian folk singer from Waterloo, Ontario who lives in Arnprior, Ontario. He has released sixteen albums, both live and studio-based, since 1997. He has toured North America and Europe. In 2012, Cardiff was nominated for a Juno Award in the category of "Roots and Traditional Album of the Year: Solo" and for a Canadian Folk Music Award in the category of "Contemporary Singer of the Year".

== Biography ==
=== Early life ===
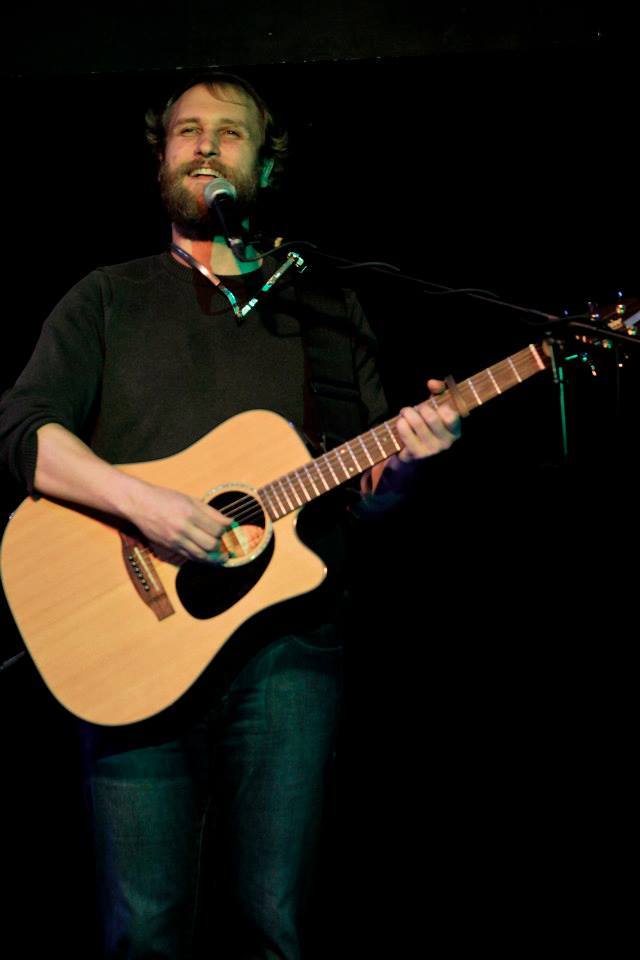
Craig Cardiff performs at Maxwell's Music House in Waterloo, Ontario

Craig Cardiff was born July, 1976 to Judy and Charles Cardiff. He grew up with his younger sisters Catherine, Susan and Elizabeth in Waterloo, Ontario, where both his parents were school teachers. Music was important during his upbringing and he was motivated by his parents to play an instrument. His parents bought him his first guitar, a Gibson J-30, when he was 15, while one of his high school teachers, taught him the guitar during his lunch hour. Cardiff began to perform at coffeehouses and with some bands in high school. While studying at the University of Waterloo, he performed at local pubs, open mic events, and coffeehouses. He also worked as a booking agent, organizing shows at Fed Hall, including The Guess Who. Cardiff moved to the Ottawa area from Waterloo when he was in his twenties. He lived in Wakefield for a few years before buying an old farmhouse in Arnprior, which now also serves as a home recording studio.

=== 1997-2010s ===
In September 1997, Cardiff debuted with the album Judy Garland (You're Never Home) which included Deanna Knight, Tom Murray, Danny Michel, Joel Stouffer, Paul Mathew and Catherine Cardiff. It was re-released in August 2006. Cardiff released his album Goodnight (Go Home) in 2007. In 2007, View Magazine stated that while Cardiff "...maintains a dedicated fan base", he "...is more a secret than a household name, despite his songs revealing the craft of one of the best in the business". View Magazine stated in 2007 that he was "playing bigger rooms, touring more and receiving more critical acclaim" after his 11th release, Good Night (Go Home)." The magazine called Goodnight (Go Home) "arguably Cardiff's most accomplished release to date."

He released Floods & Fires in November 2011. The album earned a Juno Award nomination as Roots and Traditional Album of the Year: Solo, as well as a Canadian Folk Music Awards nomination as Contemporary Singer of the Year. The album was in the SoundScan Top 10 for a week, and Exclaim! magazine called it "a major breakthrough." When Cardiff released his latest album, Love Is Louder (Than All This Noise) Part 1 & 2, in November 2013, Exclaim! magazine stated: "With a catalogue now well into double digits and a national fan base that is surely the envy of his singer-songwriter peers, Ottawa's Craig Cardiff has been the model of how to be a successful independent Canadian musician. However, with his new double album, Love Is Louder (Than All This Noise) Parts 1 & 2, he seems better poised than ever to break into the mainstream, having recorded with a full band for the first time." When Love Is Louder (Than All This Noise) Part 1 & 2 was released, it reached as high as No. 8 on the iTunes singer-songwriter charts and for a time was the only independent Canadian album in the Top 20.

== Recording ==
Cardiff has offered at least one new release almost every year, and his catalogue includes live albums, studio albums, collaborations with other artists and tributes to songwriters he admires. Over the years, he has experimented with various recording styles and distribution platforms for his albums – one release, Mistletoe (Kissing Songs), was recorded entirely on an iPod Touch.

=== Upstream Fishing All The Words, He Is: Birthday Cards For Bob Dylan ===
On 24 May 2018, Craig Cardiff released his first tribute cover album. The project included five Bob Dylan cover songs, selected for their influence on Cardiff's own music style.

Reflecting on Bob Dylan's influence, Cardiff says "I had the same relationship with Bob Dylan's songs that I think everyone does with a favourite artist – I tried to crack the code about what he was writing about, while sitting in the middle of their tangle and ache and joy. All his words were perfect, and he had all of them. AND it bothered my parents – "He Can't Sing!" they said, dismissively, the same way they did when they saw me spending money on Cokes, the Dickie Dee ice cream trucks, Mad Magazines, or heaven forbid, Cracked. Wasted money!"

Cardiff's goal for the project was to inject his own musical style into some of the songs that influenced him the most, keeping the production and arrangement of each song simple with limited instrumentation. The cover album's single, "Don't Think Twice, It's All Right", reached over a half million streams on Spotify within the first month of the album's release.

The album was recorded in his home recording studio in Arnprior, ON in collaboration with Jeff Watkins, Jesse Harding, and Thom Rados.

=== Love Is Louder (Than All This Noise) Part 1 & 2 ===
On 19 November 2013, Cardiff released his first double album, Love Is Louder (Than All This Noise) Part 1 & 2. It includes boisterous group "sing-alongs", and gentle lullabies, and full live band recordings, as well as more subdued, acoustic settings. Cardiff stated that in his first work with producers Ben Leggett and Andre Wahl, they encouraged him to not repeat his previous work and to make use of his producers to push him creatively. While Cardiff was nervous, he worked with the pair to explore full live band settings, "loud or... hard" arrangements, and exploring the "acoustic" of his songs, with cello, clarinet and violin arrangements used for different songs. While making the album, Leggett and Wahl challenged Cardiff to step outside his "comfort zone" and record with a full band for the first time.

Love Is Louder (Than All This Noise) has 21 tracks, with some songs getting both loud and gentle treatments to give the song "two faces," explains Cardiff. Cardiff, Leggett and Wahl approached the two sides of the album in two very different ways. For Part 1, they recorded at Chalet Studios, which has previously hosted acts such as Rush and Barenaked Ladies, and Leggett and Wahl coached Cardiff through the process of recording with a backing band, very different from his solo singer-songwriter experience. Cardiff called the live band recordings "very uncomfortable" yet very exciting", particularly noting his work with members of Lindi Ortega's band and piano player and singer-songwriter Mike Evin for Part 1.

In Part 2, Cardiff, Leggett and Wahl revisited many of the same songs as Part 1 with strings and wind instrument arrangements. For "There's a song" and "Boy Inside the Boat", Wahl suggested an R&B approach; while Cardiff initially did not like this treatment, in the end Cardiff called these two songs the "...most beautiful standout songs". Cardiff took on new roles for Love Is Louder (Than All This Noise) Part 1 & 2, such as arranging cello parts and, for the first time, helping with the album's production.

=== Floods & Fires ===
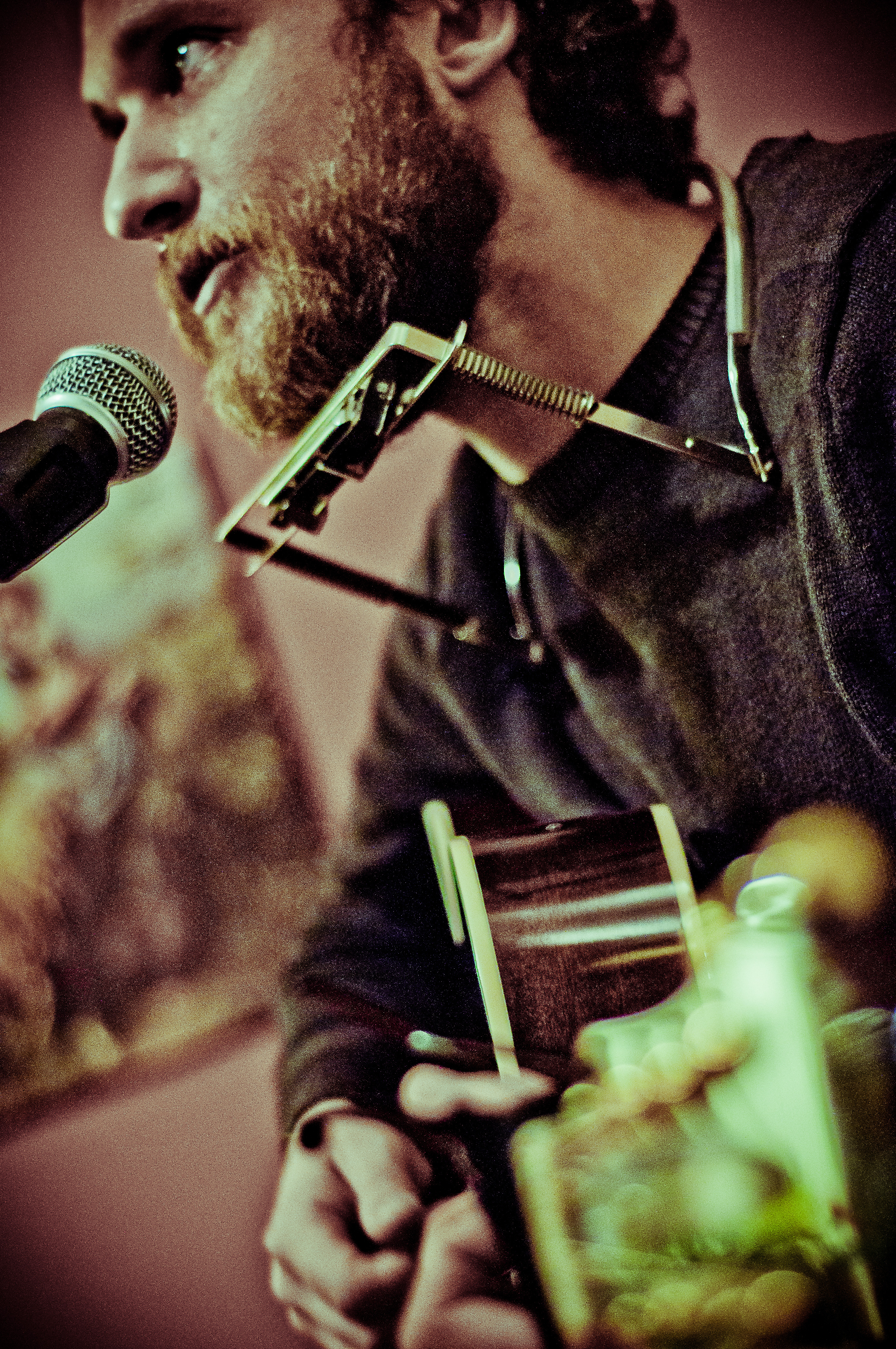
Craig Cardiff - House Concert 1 - Photography by Jeff Epp

While critics called Love Is Louder (Than All This Noise) Part 1 & 2 different than anything Cardiff has released before, the team behind it is familiar. Ben Leggett (Faraway Neighbours, Ben Hermann) and Andre Wahl (Hawksley Workman, Luke Doucet) also produced Floods & Fires, the album that earned Cardiff a nomination for a 2012 Juno Award for Roots and Traditional Album of the Year: Solo and a Canadian Folk Music Award nomination as 2012 Contemporary Singer of the Year. He called the recordings a "phenomenal experience", and says he gave himself "...permission to explore songs" with "anything from beat boxing to full horn sections."

For Floods & Fires, Cardiff and Leggett spent 18 months working in Cardiff's home studio in Arnprior. This was the longest period of time Cardiff spent on any of his releases, which are often recorded live or "off the floor" in the studio. For this album, Leggett re-jigged Cardiff's home studio, co-wrote some of the material and even moved into Cardiff's house to get the job done. "I warned him there would be a lot of scope creep with this album because I had an idea how big I wanted it to be, and I wanted to spend a lot of time," says Cardiff. "I didn't want to set parameters ... I wanted to feel confident that the songs are fully realized." Floods & Fires represents a new approach to recording for Cardiff.

"A lot of my albums have been done off the cuff," Cardiff explains. For this album, he took the time and made accepting challenges part of the process and made sure he would not have any regrets after the process. Floods & Fires is considered an ambitious album, as it features a horn section, bowed strings, electronic instrument programming and guest performers, including a high school choir. Cardiff has explained that the title (Floods & Fires) alludes to Biblical plagues which bring both destruction and opportunity. The album's 14 tracks examine "love and love's leaving, celebrate parenthood and... explore the balance between heartbreak and joy." Cardiff says the songs were "...crafted during a difficult period of my life," says Cardiff. "When hard things happened, I kept reminding myself to choose joy instead of choosing to be afraid and closing up. That's what I kept coming back to – fear rents the cheapest room in the house. I didn't want to live like that anymore."

=== Goodnight (Go Home) ===
When Cardiff released his album Goodnight (Go Home) in 2007, media took notice of the fact that he wasn't selling plastic-wrapped, jewel-cased editions of the album during his tour. Instead, he asked fans to bring along USB keys to buy a digital download of the album, although he did sell "old-fashioned CDs" and jewel cases for an additional fee. "The green focus for us is just in reducing the amount of plastic we were using in CDs," says Cardiff, who offered album inserts and art to fans who purchased digital music for their USB so they would still have a physical connection to the album. The Ottawa Citizen stated that the song "When People Go" had, "unwittingly, become Craig Cardiff's Closing Time."

Cardiff wrote the "jaunty song about death" with a chorus that states "goodnight, go home, there is nothing more to see here," for his daughter, who was 17 months old at the time, to explain to her what happens to people when they die. After hearing the song, DJs at campus bars in British Columbia and Ontario asked to use it as their last song of the night. "I explained that I actually wrote it for my daughter for when she starts asking questions about death and funerals" says Cardiff. The Brant Advocate pointed out the connection between Brantford, Ontario, and the song "Dance Me Outside". The song was inspired by Cardiff's mother telling him about growing up in Brantford and about First Nations woman outside of town. "She was trying to hitchhike, to catch a ride back in, and couldn't," explains Cardiff. "She ended up passing from exposure. The worst part is that it's all over … Each community has a story like that; it's difficult. So there was that story that existed, and then there was the Bruce McDonald film Dance Me Outside. I hadn't seen the film, but it just had this idea that even in hard things, still having dignity, still standing up tall, even to a very bitter, sad end. That was the idea."

"Smallest Wingless", which the Western Gazette has called one of Cardiff's most popular songs, was inspired by a photographer friend who worked closely with Now I Lay Me Down To Sleep, a non-profit organization that provides families of babies who are stillborn or are at risk of dying as newborns with free professional portraits with their babies. Cardiff's song tells the story of two parents welcoming a newborn into the world, only to be told that the child will only survive for a few hours. "A lot of people share their experiences with me in regards to that," Cardiff has said of the song.

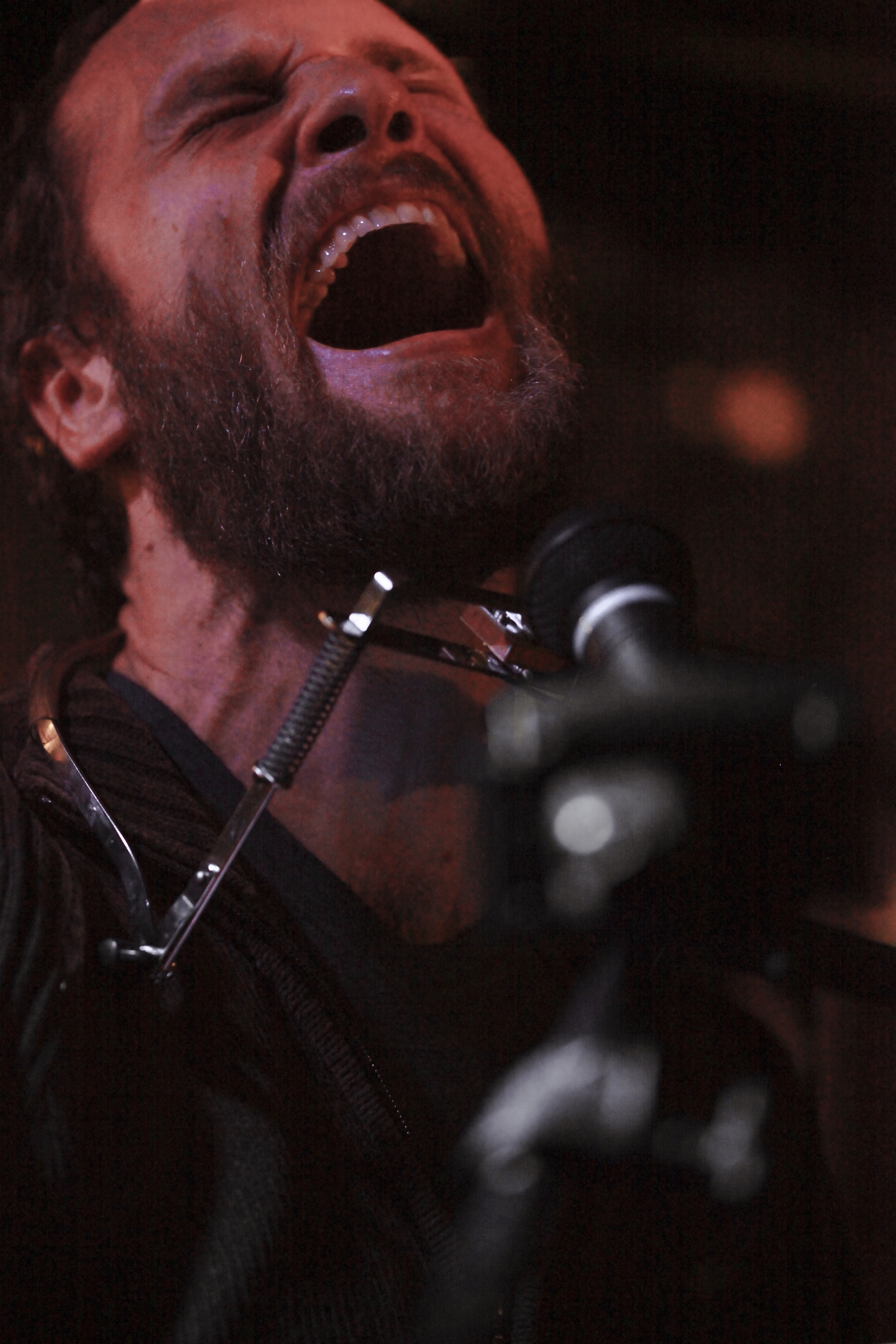
Craig Cardiff performs at The Albion Hotel in Guelph, Ontario. Photo by Adam M. Dee of Subtle Solace Photo & Fine Arts (@SubtleSolaceArt).

From a recording standpoint, Goodnight (Go Home) is different than the 10 albums that came before it. Produced by Les Cooper (Jill Barber, Andy Stochansky), the album came together over a longer period than any of Cardiff's previous releases. "I think what I learned on this album is that it's good to capture everything and eavesdrop a lot and be like a bird building a nest, taking in little parts of everything – and then to walk away from that," he says. Musically, Goodnight (Go Home) features Paul Mathew (Hidden Cameras), Michael Olsen (K-os, Arcade Fire), Kieran Adams (Sarah Harmer), Rose Cousins, Joel Stouffer (Dragonette, Jason Collette) and Lisa MacIsaac (Madison Violet).

=== Studio albums ===
Among Cardiff's releases, his studio albums include Novemberish (Songs From The Rain), Love Is Louder (Than All This Noise) Part 1 & 2, Floods & Fires, Mothers & Daughters, Goodnight (Go Home), Auberge Blacksheep, Fistful of Flowers, Soda, Happy, Live At The Boehmer Box Company, Great American White Trash Novel and Judy Garland (You're Never Home). The album Kissing Songs (Mistletoe), which was released in 2008, was recorded entirely on an iPod Touch using the Octopod application.

=== Live albums ===
Cardiff has released a number of live albums. Songs For Lucy was recorded at the Blacksheep Inn in Wakefield, Quebec, and released in 2010. Easter Eggs, released in 2007, is a collection of live recordings from various performances. Featuring songs by Cardiff and by Toronto's Les Cooper, Bombshelter Livingroom was recorded live at the University of Waterloo Bombshelter Pub and was released in 2005. Gingers on Barrington Street, which was released in 2003, is a shared album featuring songs by Cardiff and by Rose Cousins. It was recorded at Ginger's Tavern above the Granite Brewery in downtown Halifax.

== Collaborations and covers ==
Cardiff often pays tribute to his favourite songwriters in his performances and on his albums. In 2010, Cardiff released the album Mothers & Daughters, featuring 11 covers of songs written by some of his favourite female songwriters. These include Ani Difranco, Cyndi Lauper, Joni Mitchell, Gillian Welch, Patty Griffin, Sinéad O'Connor, Björk, Indigo Girls and Suzanne Vega. Cardiff's album Fistful of Flowers, released in 2005, features his version of songs written by Peter Gabriel, Elvis Costello, Suzanne Vega, Martin Sexton and others. In 2018, Cardiff released a five-song album of exclusively Bob Dylan covers.

"I'm a huge fan of other songwriters, and this album is a way to reinterpret what they've done and lend my signature," Cardiff told the Queen's Journal. "I've had a lot of requests from listeners who've attended shows over the past few years to put out an album like this, and all of the pieces of the project just fell together." "I'm very proud of how it ended up feeling like a cohesive show," he adds. "And it features musicians I love playing with—Paul Mathew on double bass, Les Cooper on Rhodes piano and guitar, Joel Stouffer on drums. It feels like a hug."

Cardiff has built a community of musicians, songwriters, producers and engineers with whom he works closely. Many of them have worked with him on several albums over the years. Cardiff has said that he likes collaborating with people who "are challenging and not comfortable with just saying yes to things." He recorded with a band for the first time for his latest album, Love Is Louder (Than All This Noise) Part 1 & 2. Recording live off the floor with musicians James Robertson, Paul Mathew, Sly Juhas, Mike Evin and Robbie Grunwald, Cardiff found himself far outside his comfort zone, intimidated and amazed. "It was funny to be intimidated while making this album, to come into the sessions and think, these guys are amazing players, I'd better remember my capo position," he says. "If there's anything I want to get better at, it's to push myself musically by creating those situations with other artists."

=== Ben Leggett and Andre Wahl ===
Cardiff has worked closely with producer/engineer Ben Leggett of North Bay, Ontario, for a number of years, and Leggett has become more involved in the albums. Leggett produced Cardiff's albums Song for Lucy and Mothers and Daughters and provided mixing on the albums Happy, Live at the Boehmer Box Company, Easter Eggs, Bombshelter Livingroom, Fistful of Flowers and Gingers on Barrington Street. Leggett played a much bigger part in the Juno-nominated album Floods & Fires than any previous release, which he and Cardiff recorded over a span of a year and a half. "We really went the extra mile to get the most possible out of the songs. There is everything on this album: Piano, horns, electric guitar, drums, bass, clarinet, saxophone...," says Leggett. "I love the album ... I am very proud of it." With Floods & Fires, Cardiff and Leggett also worked with mixer/producer/engineer Andre Wahl, who provided additional production and mixing.

The trio joined forces once again for Cardiff's project Love Is Louder (Than All This Noise) Part 1 & 2. Together, Wahl and Leggett pushed Cardiff to make an album that didn't sound like anything he had recorded before. Leggett and Cardiff also worked together to compose the soundtrack for the independent Canadian film In Return by Chris Dymond, which was released in 2012.

=== Les Cooper ===
When you read the liner notes for many of Cardiff's albums, you will see the name Les Cooper. Besides producing, mixing and arranging on many albums, Cooper has also provided background vocals and played a variety of instruments on Cardiff's releases, including piano, guitar, banjo, organ, and percussion. Whether playing, mixing or producing, Cooper has been involved in the albums Goodnight (Go Home), Auberge Blacksheep, Fistful of Flowers, Gingers on Barrington Street, Soda and Bombshelter Living Room – a shared album featuring original songs written by both Cardiff and Cooper that was recorded live at the University of Waterloo's Bombshelter Pub.

=== Rose Cousins ===
Cardiff has collaborated with Halifax-based singer-songwriter Rose Cousins. She has sung on a number of his albums, and they have released a live album together. Cousins met Cardiff while she was a student at Dalhousie University in Halifax. "I fell in love with his music," she recalls. "He became a huge influence, he taught me a lot. In addition to being a terrific songwriter and performer, he's a great entrepreneur." In 2003, Cardiff and Cousins released Gingers on Barrington Street, a joint live album they recorded in Halifax.

== Performing/touring ==
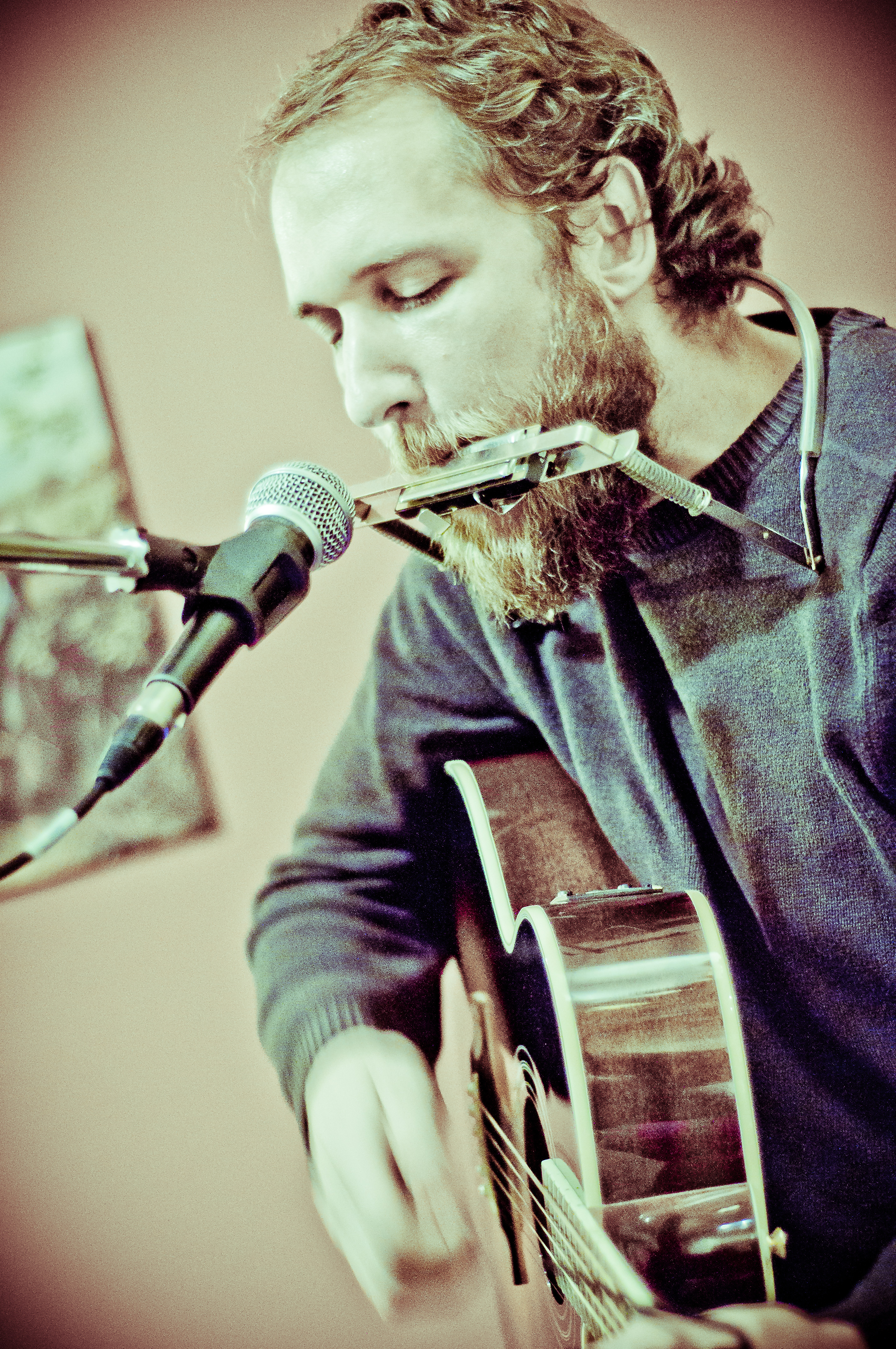
Craig Cardiff - House Concert 2 - Photography by Jeff Epp

Cardiff, who has played in camps, backyards, prisons, churches, basements, festivals, kitchens and hundreds of living rooms, is known as an "advocate of alternate venue touring." What takes Cardiff into unique performance venues and into so many living rooms is a willingness to go where his fans want to see him. In 2007, while booking a Canadian tour, he turned to his fans to help him. Through his website, Cardiff asked fans to suggest where he should play and then booked shows through MySpace and Facebook. Many of those venues were small and intimate, and on that tour, Cardiff booked three house concerts. Because he is going where his fans suggest he play, Cardiff asks them to help spread the word about his shows. "It's not unmediated. It's just more fan-directed, and that's exciting," he says of what the Globe and Mail called "tour economics on a good-neighbour level," adding: "I think I'll manage to avoid hotels for most of the tour because of fans and friends who are able to offer spare rooms and couches."

While headlining the Hay Days festival in Hay River, Northwest Territories in June 2013, Cardiff told The Hub newspaper that after touring in major centres in the United States and Canada, he now prefers going "off the beaten track" to perform. His friendships with local people keeps Cardiff coming back to "alternate" locations that are more difficult to reach, he explains. "Does it make sense financially? Not always. But it's about the connections you form with different people, the friends of friends who help you out." For Cardiff, no crowd is too small and no venue too obscure. "When music happens in places where people don't expect it to, it's more interesting and makes it more important," he says.

Cardiff can turn any setting into an intimate affair. And while he's touring, he makes a point of keeping the relationship with his fans personal, as he invites and accepts any opportunity to make his audience as much a part of the performance as he is. "The shows that I enjoy the most happen in places where it's most intimate," Cardiff told The Ontarion. "I just like places where people make music or want to have music made for them. I've always felt pretty lucky to [be a part of] that." Cardiff has played with and opened for Glen Phillips, Lucy Kaplansky, Dan Bern, Natalia Zukerman, Andy Stochansky, Sarah Harmer, Kathleen Edwards, Blue Rodeo, Gordon Downie, Hawksley Workman, Sarah Slean, Skydiggers, 54-40 and more.

=== House concerts ===
Cardiff includes many house concerts on his tours, frequently preceding a larger public show with an intimate performance in a fan's living room. "There are people connecting, people introducing themselves to each other", "all these different groups of friends." Cardiff has been bringing his music into his fans' homes since the early 2000s. Cardiff told Carleton University's Capital Arts Online that he was inspired when, as a teenager in Waterloo, he began volunteering with a woman who organized performances in churches. Trying to expand on that theme, he began playing music and telling stories in an intimate environment by performing in his fans' living rooms. Fans regularly reach invite him to perform in their homes. Lisanna Sullivan, an artist living outside of Whitehorse, Yukon, hosted a house concert in June 2013 and called it "one of the best nights of her life." "It is an element" he is comfortable in, she says of having Cardiff perform in her home. She calls it "one of the best ways to listen to a musician because it is so intimate."

=== Festivals ===
Cardiff has performed at The Tim Hortons Ottawa Dragon Boat Festival, POP Montreal, the Shelter Valley Folk Festival, Hay Days, Hillside Festival, Ottawa Bluesfest and Waterloo Sounds Of Summer.

=== Art and activism ===
Whether he's performing to a smaller house concert crowd or at a large public gathering, Cardiff isn't afraid to mix music with a bit of community activism. Cardiff played a last-minute concert in the living room of PhD students in Victoria to help them raise funds for their AIDS outreach exchange to Africa. He has also performed at the University of Western Ontario's mob vote, alongside Rick Mercer. In March 2012, Cardiff performed at Phog Lounge in Windsor, Ontario, to support MedOutreach, a program by University of Windsor and University of Western Ontario medical, dental and nursing students that took them to Tanzania to help treat patients at clinics and orphanages. Cardiff told the Windsor Star that it's not so much the causes, but the people behind the causes that interest him. "Those are the people who are wonderfully dangerous," he says. "They've been bitten." In March 2013, Cardiff performed a benefit concert in Thunder Bay, Ontario, to raise money for Collateral Damage Project, which is based in Thunder Bay and was founded by Scott Chisholm. The goal of Collateral Damage Project is preventing suicide by stopping stigma, creating proactive dialogue and pushing for gatekeeper training.

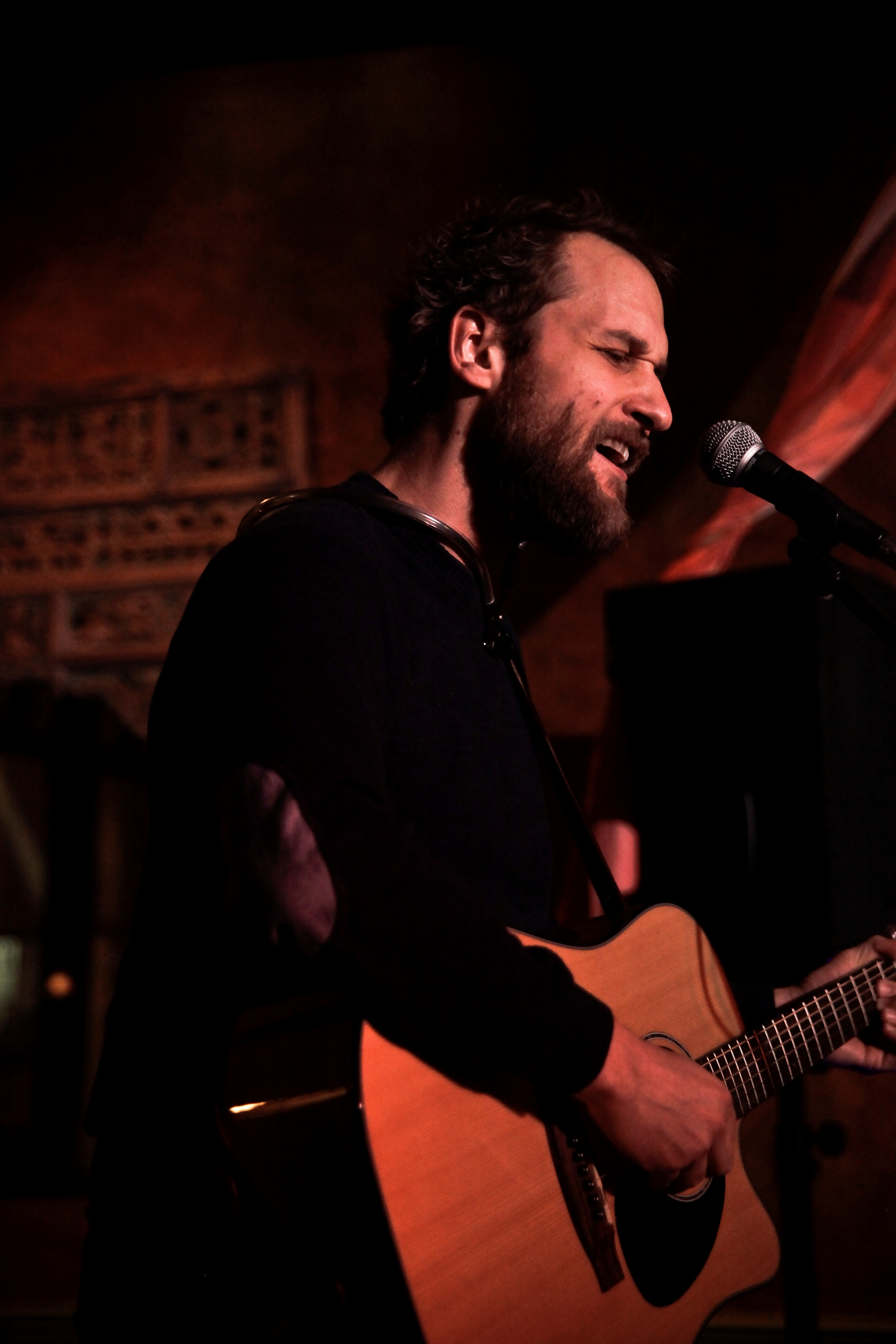
Craig Cardiff sings at Foster's Inn in Stratford, Ontario. Photo by Adam M. Dee of Subtle Solace Photo & Fine Arts (@SubtleSolaceArt).

It was a good fit because Cardiff has been a supporter of social causes and an advocate for mental health. He encourages people to be open and share things about themselves, both good and bad. "We all have issues and when we start talking about it … that's the key of making everybody relax a little bit and just be open to everyone," he says. Throughout his career, Cardiff has volunteered his time to support organizations such as Extend-A-Family Waterloo Region, Canuck Place, the Ottawa Regional Cancer Foundation's Maplesoft Centre for Cancer Survivorship Care, Elephant Thoughts Educational Outreach, the Oxford People Against the Landfill Alliance and many others. In 2010, he performed at the first-ever Canada Without Poverty Dig'n'it(y) Busking Event in Brantford, Ontario.

== Workshops ==
For the past 12 years, Cardiff has made a point of taking the time to offer workshops at schools, camps, festivals and churches throughout North America. In the fall of 2012, he did one day-long workshop with students at Churchill Alternative School in Ottawa that impacted the entire school community. Inspired by Cardiff's song Safe Here, teachers Dana Campbell and Natalie Shorkey wanted to incorporate the messages they heard in the song about safety, community and contribution into their classrooms, and they invited Cardiff to come to their school. Leading up to Cardiff's visit, they brought their Grade 2/3 and Grade 4/5 classes together to talk about what the song meant to them and brainstorm ideas for a song of their own that would reflect many of the same ideas. Cardiff spent a day at Churchill Alternative School, and the entire school community had a chance to learn about "Music as Magic" with him and to contribute ideas to a song they wrote together that day called Love Turns I Into We. "I think what we saw in the students and in ourselves as well was inspiration," says Campbell. "A few teachers came up to me and said they had never seen some of their students so engaged ... It really transformed the kids in a positive way, especially those kids that don't engage as much in what's going on."

Multi-aged class groups with primary and junior students came together and participated in 50-minute sessions throughout the day. "Each class had the opportunity to pool their ideas and add their own verses to the song, which resulted in a song that reflected the entire school's ideas of what love is," explains Campbell. "Craig listened to and wrote down the children's ideas and helped solidify them to create Love Turns I Into We." Cardiff often hosts songwriting workshops with university students, bringing people together to share their ideas.

He splits workshop participants into smaller groups to create "a smaller, more comfortable space for sharing their own pieces," giving individuals feedback in a "positive and enriching environment". Cardiff has been facilitating workshops for many years, and he sees them as another way to connect with people who love music. "Workshops provide the opportunity to connect with songwriters who are on campus or in the community," he says. "It's something I've been doing to try and connect that way." As Cardiff sees it, a workshop is not a one-way dialogue, but a conversation. "You end up performing and you kind of do your thing, but the opportunity to encourage people feels like a different piece of work," he says. "I'm excited to meet some of these people 10, 15 years from now and see what they create." In June 2011, Cardiff participated in TEDxUWO at the University of Western Ontario in London, Ontario. The theme of this inaugural conference was 'Own Your Passion', and Cardiff gave a presentation called Fear is the Cheapest Room in the House in which he spoke about being open and passionate and choosing not to be afraid and also shared some of his songs that relate to those ideas.

"The whole concept was talking about success and innovation," Cardiff told the Nanaimo News Bulletin. "I would meet so many people during shows and tours who would confide in what they really wanted to be doing. 'I would much rather be doing this' or 'I gave up music because my parents told me it wasn't a good idea' or what have you and then they would have all these explanations as to why it wouldn't work. I just connected those ideas of understanding the importance of trying something and not making decisions that are fear-based."

== Awards ==
Cardiff was nominated for a 2012 Juno Award for Roots and Traditional Album of the Year: Solo for Floods and Fires in a category with eventual winner Bruce Cockburn, David Francey, Dave Gunning and Lindi Ortega. Floods & Fires also garnered a nomination for Cardiff as Contemporary Singer of the Year at the 2012 Canadian Folk Music Awards. Rose Cousins won the award, while Keri Latimer, Geraldine Hollett for The Once, and Catherine MacLellan were also nominated. Cardiff won the Canadian Organization of Campus Activities (COCA) Campus Entertainment Award as best singer-songwriter in both 2014 and 2013. COCA also recognized Cardiff in 2007, awarding him the Contemporary Music (Independent) Award.

== 2012 Juno Awards ==
In the lead-up to the 2012 Juno Awards ceremony in Ottawa, Cardiff had the opportunity to perform his song Safe Here (from his 2011 album Foods & Fires) with former Canadian governor general Michaëlle Jean and pianist Nick Roy at the University of Ottawa. On 26 March 2012, the trio kicked off the Juno Pianos project – which encouraged Juno nominees and members of the public to celebrate Juno Week by playing pianos that had been placed in public spaces all around Ottawa - with this performance. Jean translated the chorus of Safe Here into French, and, after singing, she told the audience that this is a song she can relate to, as she would ask herself on several occasions "am I safe here?" when she arrived in Canada in 1968 after leaving her native country of Haiti. "I ended up recording little bits of the song for her as YouTube links and then we just shared them back and forth and then when we got together she had translated them," says Cardiff. "It was pretty sweet. She's a very lovely person and I feel lucky that that happened."

== Book of Truths ==
Cardiff often passes around a notebook at his shows called a "Book of Truths". Audience members are then asked to contribute to this notebook by writing something inside, "... a story, a confession, a hope, a secret." "The nature of performing is very egotistical," he has said in the past. "There is one microphone and generally I get to have it for most of the time … the book just came from a place of wanting to give people an outlet to write down some of these stories."

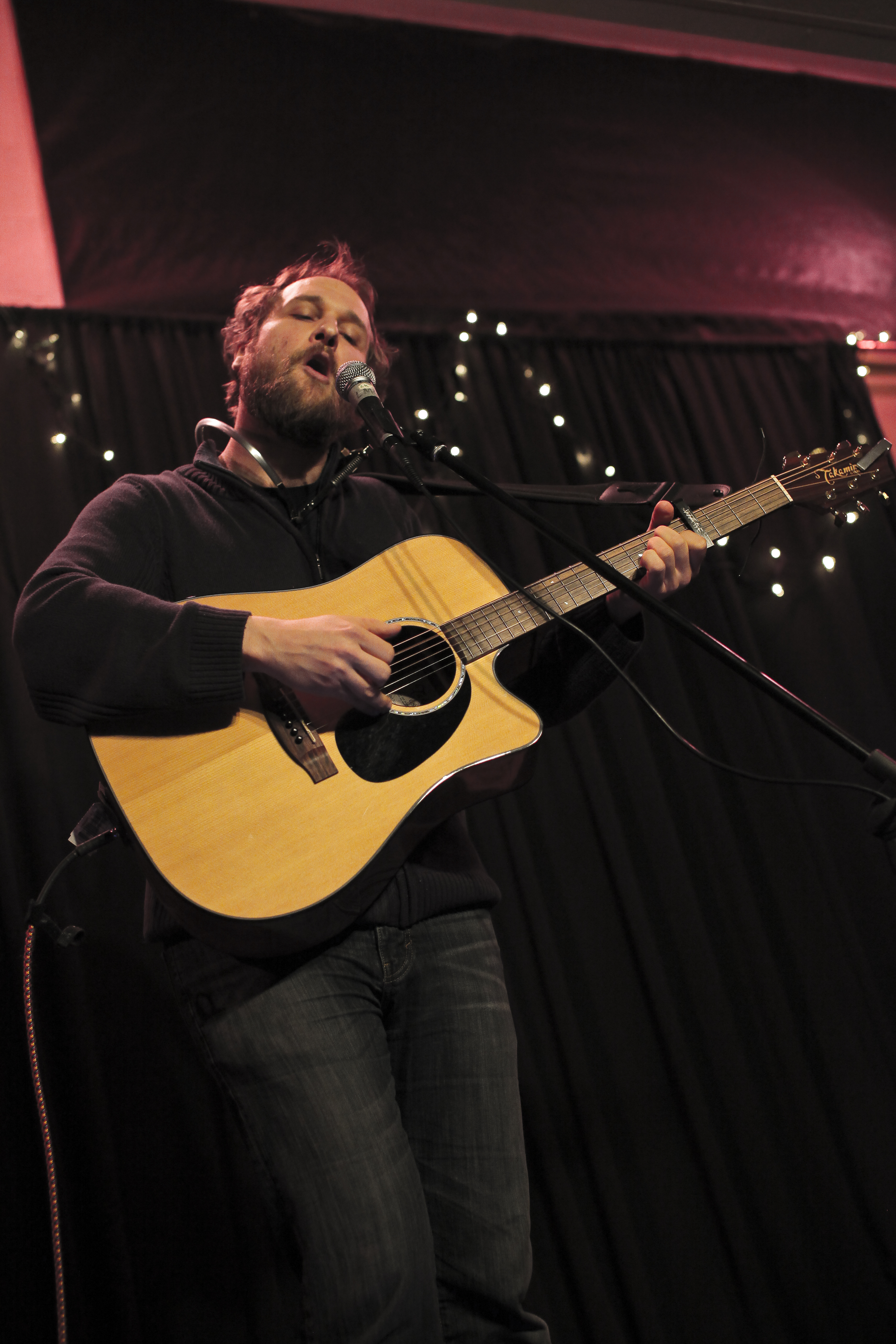
Craig Cardiff performs at the London Music Club in London, Ontario, in November 2013. Photo by Adam M. Dee of Subtle Solace Photo & Fine Arts (@SubtleSolaceArt).

The Book of Truths was born when Cardiff gave one of his notebooks to a couple and asked them to write down the story they told him about their connection with his music so that he wouldn't forget it. Over the years, a number of Cardiff's songs have been inspired by entries in his Book of Truths. The bittersweet themes running throughout his latest album, Love Is Louder (Than All This Noise) Part 1 & 2 largely stem from those stories, written anonymously by fans. "I feel a lot of these songs all started with getting one particular note from an audience member," says Cardiff. "This person had written about having a terrible year and wanting to take their own life. Just hard stuff. At the end of the night, I wrote a note back to them and later posted it online. A bunch of other people responded to it, and I feel like that idea carried over – as hard as it is to stay one more day, just don't make any big decisions tonight. Wait until tomorrow morning. That kept coming up [in my writing], being so inside of your head that it's all thinking and no feeling."

One song, Memo, was written as a response to a heartbreaking entry shared in the book by one woman. "I wanted to find the person and make sure they were okay … that they knew this was all just noise and everything would be okay..." says Cardiff. In 2011, Cardiff printed his first edition of the Book of Truths, which he sells through his website and at shows.

== Musical style and influences ==
Cardiff has described his style as "folk with a dash of sing-along and storytelling." Cardiff's music blends many songwriter genres, including folk, country, rock and traditional, always with an emphasis on strong lyrics that relate a story. He is known for engaging fans during performances, his wide vocal range and his ability to improvise, as well as for creating cohesive, emotional performances through his on-stage humour and storytelling. "A big part of what I do at my shows is improv, in terms of crowd sing-along or the book of truth project – that's been woven into everything – in terms of crowd readings and collecting these different pieces from the audience members," Cardiff told the Rocky Mountain Outlook. "The songs are constantly being re-examined and re-presented in different ways."

"Whatever magic happens when people are opened up a bit and just being with each other is a pretty special thing, and that requires the person performing to invite that from the audience, rather than simply pushing noise to them," he adds. After an intimate show at Vinyl in Guelph, Ontario, Josh Doyle remarked in The Ontarion that Cardiff's "call and response style of involving the audience made it less of a concert and more of a large group of friends and strangers getting together … Cardiff involved his audience to the point that they stopped being an audience … His between song antics and personable approach made it also a comedy show, as Cardiff pulled enough material out of the air to have everyone in Vinyl laughing hysterically." Lynn Saxberg of the Ottawa Citizen has said that "his folky melodies and soft vocals are as warm and soothing as a cup of hot chocolate. Like Paul Simon, Van Morrison and John Mayer, he finds a balance between heartache and joy." Cardiff's singing style has been compared to that of Nick Drake.

Cardiff integrates live looping, beatboxing and other non-traditional performance techniques into his live performances. "A storyteller at heart, Cardiff is renowned for his acoustic guitar-playing and soft voice, as well as the ingenious use of a digital looping pedal he performs with, which he uses to layer guitar and vocal effects over top of each other," Nick Roy noted in the Queen's Journal. Cardiff has a wide variety of influences, and he has listed B.B. King, Ani DiFranco and Scott Merritt among them. Elvis Costello and Paul Simon are also among his favourite musicians. "I tend to like somebody whose lyrics will stand up on their own without the melody," says Cardiff.

== Film soundtracks ==
In 2010, Cardiff and Leggett re-recorded Cardiff's song Barney and Miriam, a tribute to the Mordecai Richler novel Barney's Version that had previously been released on Ginger's on Barrington Street with Rose Cousins in 2003, during sessions for the album Floods and Fires. The song was featured on the soundtrack for the Canadian comedy-drama Barney's Version. Cardiff's work was featured in the soundtrack for an independent Canadian film that was named Audience Choice Best Feature at the Cinéfest Sudbury International Film Festival in September 2012. Cardiff teamed up with Leggett once again to compose the soundtrack for In Return, a dark romantic comedy written and directed by Chris Dymond. The film features original compositions by Cardiff and Leggett, Cardiff's songs from Floods & Fires, and songs by Ontario bands The Famly and Faraway Neighbours.

== Discography ==
- Upstream Fishing All The Words, He Is: Birthday Cards For Bob Dylan (2018)
- Novemberish (Songs From The Rain) (2017)
- Love Is Louder (Than All This Noise) Part 1 & 2 (2013)
- Floods & Fires (2011)
- Songs for Lucy (2010 – Live)
- Mothers and Daughters (2010)
- Kissing Songs (Mistletoe) (2009)
- Easter Eggs (2007 – Live)
- Goodnight (Go Home) (2007)
- Auberge Blacksheep (2006)
- Bombshelter Livingroom w/ Les Cooper (2005 – Live)
- Fistful of Flowers (2005)
- Soda (2003)
- Ginger's on Barrington Street w/ Rose Cousins (2003 – Live)
- Happy (2001)
- Live at the Boehmer Box Company (2000 – Live)
- Great American White Trash Novel (1997)
- Judy Garland (You're Never Home....) (1997)

== Related videos ==
- Craig Cardiff talks to CTV Kitchener about his new album, Love Is Louder (Than All This Noise) Part 1 & 2
- Craig Cardiff gives Shaw TV Medicine Hat a preview of his new double album
- Craig Cardiff performs Safe Here with former governor general Michaëlle Jean as part of the Juno Pianos project
- Craig Cardiff presents Fear is the Cheapest Room in the House at TEDxUWO
