= The Waking Eyes =

Canadian rock band

- Origin: Winnipeg, Manitoba, Canada
- Genre: Rock
- Years active: 2002–2010
- Label: Warner Music Canada
- Members: Matt Peters; Joey Penner; Steve Senkiw; Rusty Matyas
- Past members: Myron Schulz; Russ Dufault

The Waking Eyes were a Canadian rock band from Winnipeg and Steinbach, Manitoba.

== History ==
The band formed after the break-up of two other Manitoba bands, The Pets from Steinbach and Novillero from Winnipeg. In 2002, The Waking Eyes released a full-length album, Combing the Clouds.

In 2004, The Waking Eyes followed up with a second album, Video Sound. The album won a 2005 Western Canada Music Award. Shortly before the album was released, bassist Russ Dufault left the band, temporarily replaced by The Meligrove Band's Michael Small (for a short tour and the "Watch Your Money" music video), before Joey Penner was introduced.

The band went on several tours, traveling across Canada, as well as into the United States and to overseas locations including Germany for POPKOMM's "Kick it like Canada". In 2005, the group was nominated for a Juno Award for New Group of the Year but lost to Alexisonfire.

The Waking Eyes spent the better part of 2006 holed-up in their Winnipeg jam space, writing and demoing songs for an album. Pre-production took place in Winnipeg during February 2007.

The band recorded the follow-up to Video Sound in a Winnipeg studio in May 2007 with producer/engineer John Paul Peters (formerly of The Undecided).

The Waking Eyes' record, Holding on to Whatever It Is, was released digitally via iTunes in July 2008. The band released the record on vinyl in September, and CD copies became available in November. The album won a Western Canada Music Award for best independent album.

=== Hiatus ===
In July 2010, The Waking Eyes went on hiatus, allowing the members of the band to concentrate on other musical projects. Matyas formed a soul-pop band, Imaginary Cities, with Winnipeg singer Marti Sarbit; he also performed solo as Terrier and with Ewan Currie as The Mothers Brothers Band.

Peters' 2010 album by his band, Royal Canoe, titled Co-Op Mode, included collaborations, co-writes and performances with all of the members of The Waking Eyes. Peters continues writing, recording and/or producing in the Winnipeg area for/with The Liptonians, Slattern, Demetra, Ruth Moody, This Hisses and Triunfo do Gato. Milk is a joke hip-hop act featuring Matyas and Peters, and Racket (pronounced "Racket in Brackets") is a Ratatat-like dance act fronted by Peters.

== Discography ==
- Combing the Clouds (2002)
- Video Sound (2004)
- Holding On to Whatever It Is (2008)

== Music videos ==
- "Watch Your Money"
- "The Beginning"
- "On a Train"
- "But I Already Have It"
- "Taking the Hard Way" (With scenes showing their live shows)
- "All Empires Fall"
- "Wolves at the Door"

== Radio singles ==
- "Watch Your Money"
- "Beginning"
- "On a Train"
- "If You Know Why"
- "All Empires Fall"

== See also ==
- List of bands from Canada
