= The Pets (2000s band) =

Canadian indie rock and power pop band

- Origin: Steinbach, Manitoba, Canada
- Genres: Indie rock
- Spinoffs: The Waking Eyes
- Past members: Chris Peters; Matthew Peters; Myron Schulz; Stephen Senkiw

The Pets were an indie rock and power pop band from Steinbach, Manitoba, Canada. The members of The Pets were Chris Peters, Matthew Peters, Myron Schulz, and Stephen Senkiw.

== History ==
The Pets came together in 1999 and began to record power pop songs using a computer and rented portable studio equipment. In between recording sessions, which extended over about eight months, they played a few live shows locally. They then approached Endearing Records, which released the tracks as an album, Love and War, in 2000; by this time The Pets had disbanded. The album was reviewed favourably and received considerable airplay on college radio in Canada, particularly in Winnipeg. Members of the Pets went on to form The Waking Eyes.
