= 2023 in Canadian music =

The following musical events and releases that happened in 2023 in Canada.

== Events ==
- March 13 – Juno Awards of 2023
- April 2 – 18th Canadian Folk Music Awards
- June 30 – The 36th annual Saskatchewan Jazz Festival kicked off in Saskatoon, Saskatchewan.
- July 6 – Prism Prize
- September 16 – 2023 Canadian Country Music Awards
- September 19 – 2023 Polaris Music Prize
- November 5 – 45th Félix Awards

== Albums released ==
=== A ===
- Alaskan Tapes, Who Tends a Garden - January 13
- Jeremie Albino, Tears You Hide
- All Hands Make Light, Darling the Dawn - April 21
- Matt Andersen, The Big Bottle of Joy - March 10
- Aphrose, Roses
- Aqyila, For the Better
- Arkells, Laundry Pile - September 21
- Avenoir, Noire
- Aysanabee, Here and Now

=== B ===
- Bahamas, Bootcut - September 15
- Tim Baker, Along the Mountain Road - October 20
- Gord Bamford, Fire It Up - April 28
- Del Barber, Almanac - April 28
- Jill Barber, Homemaker - February 10
- The Beaches, Blame My Ex - September 15
- Eric Bearclaw, Distant Places
- Begonia, Powder Blue - February 24
- Black Atlass, When The Darkness Fades - October 6
- Blackburn Brothers, SoulFunkn'Blues
- Haley Blais, Wisecrack
- La Bottine Souriante, Domino!
- Boy Golden, For Jimmy
- Dean Brody, Right Round Here - September 15
- Michael Jerome Browne, Gettin' Together
- Louise Burns, Element - April 21

=== C ===
- Daniel Caesar, Never Enough - April 7
- Aleksi Campagne, For the Giving / Sans rien donner
- Charlotte Cardin, 99 Nights - August 25
- Chiiild, Better Luck in the Next Life - March 3
- City and Colour, The Love Still Held Me Near - March 31
- Ora Cogan, Formless
- Charlotte Cornfield, Could Have Done Anything - May 12
- Cowboy Junkies, Such Ferocious Beauty - June 2
- Crash Adams, California Girls
- Devin Cuddy, Dear Jane

=== D ===
- Helena Deland, Goodnight Summerland - October 13
- Mac DeMarco, Five Easy Hot Dogs - January 20
- Mac DeMarco, One Wayne G - April 21
- Devours, Homecoming Queen
- DijahSB, Living Simple - February 10
- The Dirty Nil, Free Rein to Passions - May 26
- Fefe Dobson, Emotion Sickness - September 29
- Gord Downie and Bob Rock, Lustre Parfait - May 5
- Drake, For All the Dogs - October 6
- Drake, For All the Dogs Scary Hours Edition - November 17
- Kevin Drew, Aging - November 3
- Dumas, Cosmologie - January 27
- Jeremy Dutcher, Motewolonuwok - October 6

=== E ===
- Jade Eagleson, Do It Anyway - September 29
- Elisapie, Inuktitut
- Elliott Brood, Town

=== F ===
- Stephen Fearing, Vejpoesi
- Feist, Multitudes - April 14
- Dominique Fils-Aimé, Our Roots Run Deep - September 22
- Luca Fogale, Run Where the Light Calls
- Jeanick Fournier, Vivante - May 19
- The Franklin Electric, Oh Brother - June 30
- Debby Friday, Good Luck - March 24
- Fucked Up, One Day - January 27

=== G ===
- Gayance, Mascarade
- Hannah Georgas, I'd Be Lying if I Said I Didn't Care - August 25
- Shane Ghostkeeper, Songs for My People
- The Glorious Sons, Glory - September 6
- Jenn Grant, Champagne Problems - June 21
- Great Lake Swimmers, Uncertain Country - April 28
- Emm Gryner, Business & Pleasure

=== H ===
- Half Moon Run, Salt - June 2
- Harrison, Birds, Bees, the Clouds and the Trees
- Hayden, Are We Good - April 5
- Tim Hecker, No Highs - April 28
- Matt Holubowski, Like Flowers on a Molten Lawn - March 24
- Home Front, Games of Power

=== I ===
- Chin Injeti, Vessels - November 2
- Brandon Isaak, One Step Closer
- Islands, And That's Why Dolphins Lost Their Legs - August 25

=== J ===
- Jackson Hollow, Roses
- James Barker Band, Ahead of Our Time - October 20
- Carly Rae Jepsen, The Loveliest Time - July 28
- July Talk, Remember Never Before - January 20
- Jutes, Ladybug - May 19
- Juurini, Aqqutinni

=== K ===
- Karkwa, Dans la seconde - September 8
- Khotin, Release Spirit
- Kid Koala, Creatures Of The Late Afternoon - April 14
- Shawnee Kish, Revolution
- Brett Kissel, The Compass Project - East Album - April 28
- Brett Kissel, The Compass Project - North Album - December 1
- Brett Kissel, The Compass Project - South Album - January 27
- Brett Kissel, The Compass Project - West Album - November 3
- Patrick Krief, Skylines - September 8

=== L ===
- Land of Talk, Performances - October 13
- Thierry Larose, Sprint!
- Bells Larsen, If I Was, I Am
- Simon Leoza, L'Enfer d'un monde
- Murray A. Lightburn, Once Upon a Time in Montreal - March 31
- Gordon Lightfoot, At Royal Albert Hall - July 14
- Lightning Dust, Nostalgia Killer
- Love Language, Indian Cowboy
- The Lowest of the Low, Welcome to the Plunderdome - October 6

=== M ===
- Majid Jordan, Good People - November 3
- Amanda Marshall, Heavy Lifting - June 9
- Kyle McKearney, A Traveler's Lament
- Tate McRae, Think Later - December 8
- Metric, Formentera II - October 13
- Tyler Joe Miller, Spillin' My Truth - August 25

=== N ===
- N Nao, L'eau et les rêves
- Ron Nelson, 40 Years Too Late
- The New Pornographers, Continue as a Guest - March 31
- New West, Based on a True Story
- NOBRO, Set Your Pussy Free
- The Northern Pikes, Time to Time - June 2
- Justin Nozuka, Daydreams & Endless Nights - June 16

=== O ===
- Ox, KTEL

=== P ===
- Griffen Palmer, Unlearn - April 28
- Nico Paulo, Nico Paulo
- Planet Giza, Ready When You Are
- Pony, Velveteen
- poolblood, mole
- Population II, Électrons libres du Québec
- Postdata, Run Wild - September 22
- William Prince, Stand in the Joy - April 14
- The Provincial Archive, Good Luck

=== R ===
- Raised by Swans, Volume 2: Run With The Silent Wildfires - March 30
- Jimmy Rankin, Harvest Highway
- Rêve, Saturn Return
- Robert Robert, Bienvenue au pays
- Benjamin Dakota Rogers, Paint Horse
- The Rural Alberta Advantage, The Rise and the Fall
- Allison Russell, The Returner - September 8
- Justin Rutledge, Something Easy - May 19

=== S ===
- Josh Sahunta, To Be Loved, Vol. 1
- Sam Roberts Band, The Adventures Of Ben Blank - October 20
- Jacques Kuba Séguin, Parfum no.1 - February 17
- Ron Sexsmith, The Vivian Line - February 17
- Joseph Shabason, Welcome To Hell - October 20
- Andy Shauf, Norm - February 10
- Gabrielle Shonk, Across the Room - February 24
- Vivek Shraya, Baby, You're Projecting - May 12
- Silverstein, Misery Made Me (Deluxe) - April 7
- Skiifall, Woiiyoie Vol. 2 — Intense City
- Dallas Smith, Dallas Smith - October 27
- Arielle Soucy, Il n'y a rien que je ne suis pas
- Souldia, Non conventionnel
- John Southworth, When You're This, This in Love - May 12
- Rae Spoon, Not Dead Yet
- Colin Stetson, When We Were That What Wept for the Sea - May 12
- Alexandra Stréliski, Néo-Romance - March 31
- Sukha, Undisputed

=== T ===
- Talk, Lord of the Flies & Birds & Bees - October 20
- Theory of a Deadman, Dinosaur - March 17
- Timber Timbre, Lovage - October 6
- Trans-Canada Highwaymen, Explosive Hits Vol. 1
- Katie Tupper, Where to Find Me
- Andrina Turenne, Bold As Logs
- Shania Twain, Queen of Me - February 3

=== U ===
- U.S. Girls, Bless This Mess - February 24
- Universal Honey, Dandelion
- Terry Uyarak, Unnuaq

=== V ===
- Vivat Virtute (Christine Fellows and John K. Samson), Hold Music

=== W ===
- Rufus Wainwright, Folkocracy - June 2
- Alli Walker, Growing Up - March 10
- Colter Wall, Little Songs - July 14
- Wax Mannequin, The Red Brain - April 14
- Whitehorse, I'm Not Crying, You're Crying - January 13
- Roy Woods, Mixed Emotions - July 28

=== Y ===
- Jonah Yano, Portrait of a Dog
- Yukon Blonde, Shuggie - October 12

=== Z ===
- Zoon, Bekka Ma'iingan

== Deaths ==
- January 12 - Robbie Bachman, drummer (Bachman–Turner Overdrive)
- January 17 - Leon Dubinsky, songwriter ("Rise Again")
- January 27 - Floyd Sneed, rock drummer (Three Dog Night)
- February 7 - Mendelson Joe, guitarist and painter
- February 13 - Guido Basso, jazz musician
- February 23 - Andrée Desautels, composer and music educator
- March 27 - Jocelyn Morlock, composer
- April 22 - Ron Cahute, accordionist
- April 28 - Tim Bachman, guitarist (Bachman–Turner Overdrive)
- May 1 - Gordon Lightfoot, singer-songwriter and guitarist
- May 26 - Andrew Lindsay, singer-songwriter (The Saddletramps)
- July 5 - Martin Stevens, pop and disco singer
- August 9 - Robbie Robertson, rock singer and songwriter (The Band)
- September 5 - Richard Laviolette, singer-songwriter
- November 11 - Peter J. Moore, record producer
- November 15 - Karl Tremblay, folk-rock singer (Les Cowboys Fringants)
- December 3 - Myles Goodwyn, rock singer (April Wine)
