= Nico Paulo (album) =

Studio album by Nico Paulo
- Released: April 7, 2023
- Studios: A cabin in the South Shore of Nova Scotia, Canada; Dream Date Studio, Upper Lahave, Nova Scotia, Canada; Tim Baker's home studio, St. John's, Newfoundland and Labrador, Canada
- Genre: Singer-songwriter
- Length: 36:35
- Languages: Canadian English, European Portuguese
- Label: Forward Music Group
- Producers: Tim Baker; Joshua Van Tassel

Nico Paulo chronology
Live at First Light (2021)	Nico Paulo (2023)

"The cabin wasn't planned. Josh Van Tassel was setting up a studio in Lunenburg, Nova Scotia, but a couple of things he needed wouldn't arrive in time. As the date of the session approached, he suggested turning a family member's cabin into a studio instead. We only used it as a recording space, so I was staying with some friends who also lived in the South Shore, and their little daughter. It really was magical."

— Nico Paulo on spontaneously recording her debut full-length album at producer Josh Van Tassel's cabin

Nico Paulo is the 2023 debut full-length album by Portuguese-Canadian musician Nico Paulo. It has received positive reviews from critics and award nominations.

== Reception ==
A review of track "Time" in Billboard Canada praised the song for Paulo's "instantly engaging voice, one that is both clear and unaffected, while the inventive production features crisp guitar and backing vocals". The Canadian Broadcasting Corporation gave several positive reviews of this album, starting with a review of "Now or Never" where Holly Gordon called it "an empathetic near-breakup song, the weight of past love holding the relationship fast for the moment", leading that critic to declare this one of the most-anticipated albums by Canadian artists in January 2023. Upon release, Gordon considered it one of the best albums of spring 2023 and one of the 31 best Canadian albums of the year, placing it at 15. At Spill Magazine, Ljubinko Zivkovic gave this release an 8.0 out of 10, writing that Paulo "presents some mature, sophisticated songwriting skills and has a voice that can carry such music".

Nico Paulo won three MusicNL awards: Album of the Year (shared with The Numinous Journey by Jing Xia), Pop Artist of the Year, and Ron Hynes Songwriter of the Year. This album was also longlisted for the 2023 Polaris Music Prize.

== Track listing ==
All songs written by Nico Paulo, with contributions by Tim Baker.

1. "Intro, Dream" – 1:48
2. "Time" – 3:13
3. "Amor Amor Amor" – 3:28
4. "The Master" – 3:24
5. "Now or Never" – 3:34
6. "Learning My Ways" – 4:31
7. "Lock Me Inside" – 3:50
8. "Lovers in the Street" – 4:39
9. "Hand Kisser" – 3:08
10. "Read My Mind" – 5:00

== Personnel ==
- Nico Paulo – acoustic guitar, electric guitar, vocals, artwork
- Tim Baker – keyboards, Mellotron, additional guitar, additional vocals, production
- Terry Campbell – trumpet
- Kyle Cunjak – acoustic bass, electric bass
- Heather Kirby – mastering at Dreamlands Mastering, Picton, Ontario, Canada
- Adam Hogan – acoustic guitar, electric guitar, lap steel guitar
- Steve Maloney – backing vocals
- Joshua Van Tassel – drums, percussion, electronics, Ondea, mixing, production
- Mary Beth Waldram – clarinet

== See also ==
- 2023 in Canadian music
- List of 2023 albums
