= Juno Award for Adult Contemporary Album of the Year =

Canadian music award

The Juno Award for Adult Contemporary Album of the Year is an annual award presented by the Canadian Academy of Recording Arts and Sciences (CARAS) for the best adult contemporary album released in Canada. It was first awarded at the 42nd Juno Awards ceremonies in 2013. The five nominees in the category are chosen by a panel of judges selected from the Canadian music industry and the winner is chosen by CARAS members.

== Recipients ==
Year	Winner	Album	Nominees	Ref.
2013	The Tenors	Lead With Your Heart	Like a Man – Adam Cohen; Burning Days – Barlow; Sans attendre – Céline Dion; All the Diamonds – Raylene Rankin	
2014	Johnny Reid	A Christmas Gift to You	In My Head – Alysha Brilla; Loved Me Back to Life – Celine Dion; Dream Catcher – Chloe Albert; The Year He Drove Me Crazy – Coral Egan	
2015	Sarah McLachlan	Shine On	Womyn – Alysha Brilla; Everything Almost – Jann Arden; Trauma: Chansons de la série télé (saison no. 5) – Cœur de pirate; Dark Swing – Ndidi	
2016	Johnny Reid	What Love Is All About	Wallflower – Diana Krall; Refined – Don Amero; A Jann Arden Christmas – Jann Arden; Under One Sky – The Tenors	
2017	Sarah McLachlan	Wonderland	Encore un Soir – Céline Dion; Hard Sail – Chantal Kreviazuk; Beating Heart – Mark Masri; A Fine Line – Heather Rankin	
2018	Michael Bublé	Nobody But Me	Rooted — Alysha Brilla; Revival — Johnny Reid; The Grand Hustle — Nuela Charles; Christmas Together — The Tenors	
2019	Michael Bublé	Love	These Are the Days — Jann Arden; Distant Danger — Nuela Charles; Meaning to Tell Ya — Molly Johnson; A Whitehorse Winter Classic — Whitehorse	
2020	Bryan Adams	Shine a Light	Melt — Nuela Charles; Both Sides — Marc Jordan; Empower — Renée Lamoureux; Unplugged Vol. 1 — Lauren Spencer-Smith	
2021	Alanis Morissette	Such Pretty Forks in the Road	Courage — Céline Dion; Pour déjouer l'ennui — Pierre Lapointe; Starlit Afternoon — Craig Stickland; CH IIII: The Come Up — Storry	
2022	Serena Ryder	The Art of Falling Apart	Meet You at the Light — Desirée Dawson; Nothing Is Lost — Luca Fogale; The Outer Circle — Mathew V; The Way You See Me — Tafari Anthony	
2023	Michael Bublé	Higher	Adventure Book — Francois Klark; Descendant — Jann Arden; He Sang She Sang — Marc Jordan and Amy Sky; A Tyler Shaw Christmas — Tyler Shaw	
2024	Amanda Marshall	Heavy Lifting	Banners, I Wish I Was Flawless, I'm Not; Luca Fogale, Run Where the Light Calls; Steph La Rochelle, Wildflower; Josh Sahunta, To Be Loved, Vol. 1	
2025	Maïa Davies	Lovers' Gothic	Aphrose, Roses; Celeigh Cardinal, Boundless Possibilities; Kellie Loder, Transitions; Maddee Ritter, Songs of Love and Death	
2026	Sarah McLachlan	Better Broken	Nuela Charles, NU2U; Rose Cousins, Conditions of Love Vol. 1; Shawn Hook, Rebuild; Sister Ray, Believer	
