= Canada–Portugal relations =

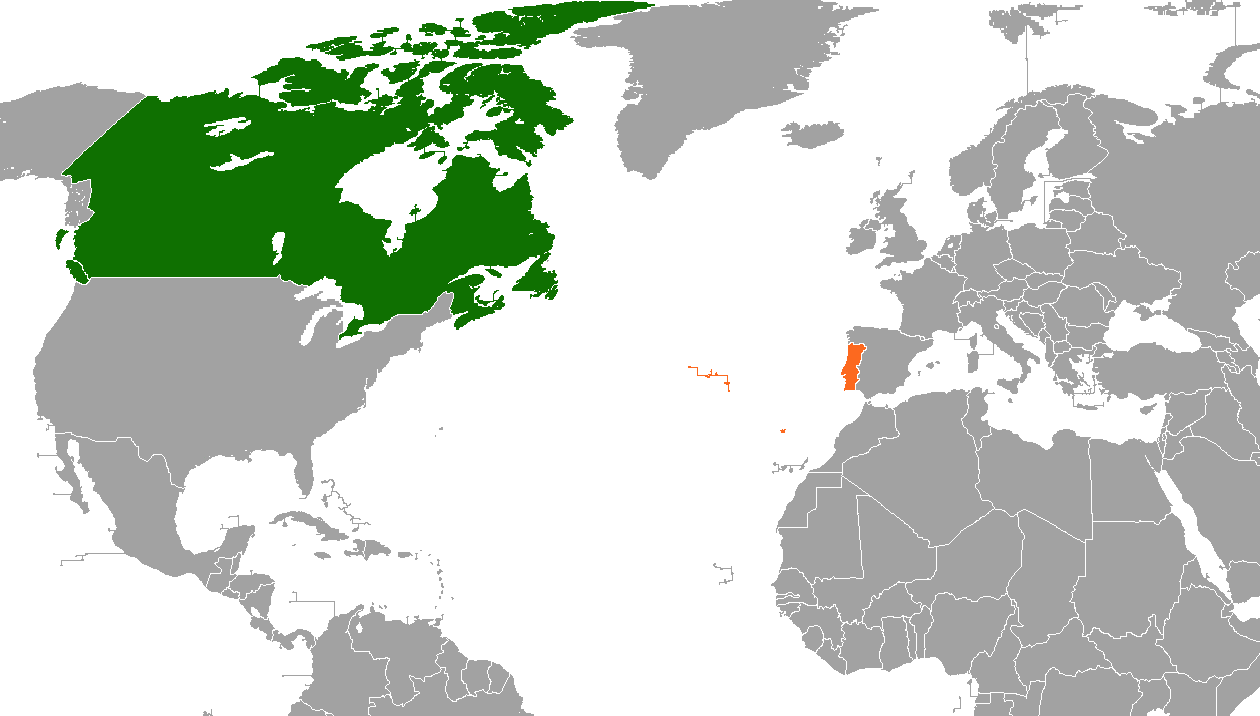

- Canada: Portugal

Canada and Portugal have friendly bilateral relations, the importance of which center on the history of Portuguese migration to Canada. Canadians of full or partial Portuguese ancestry number approximately 482,000 people. Both nations are members of NATO, the OECD, and the United Nations.

== History ==
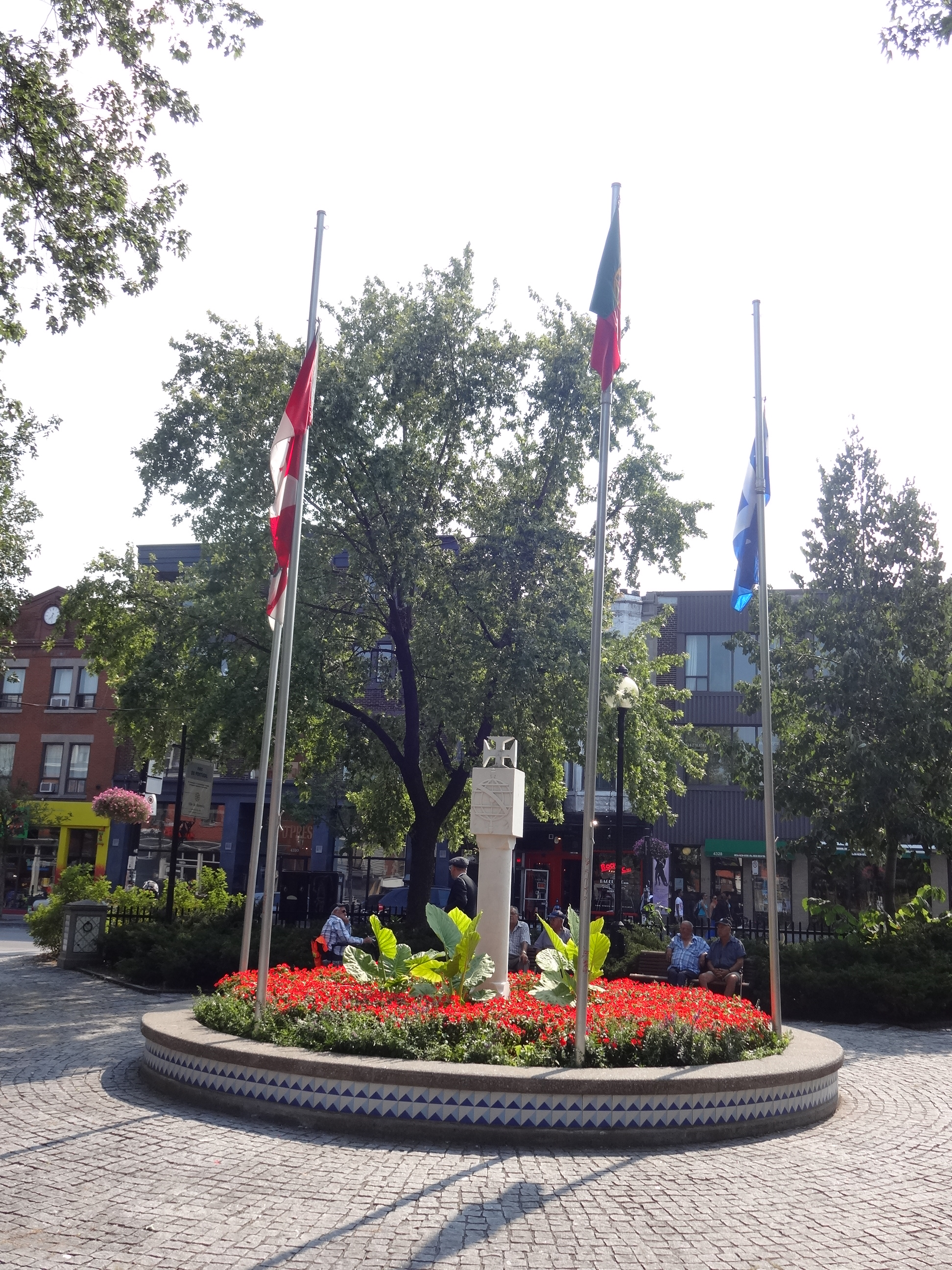
Monument to Portugal in Parc du Portugal in Montreal, Canada

One of the first European explorers to visit Canada was Gaspar Corte-Real who explored its Atlantic regions. Some of the earliest Portuguese migrants settled in Labrador in the 16th century. Many Portuguese settlers arrived in Canada between 1940 and 1984, with many escaping the dictatorship of António de Oliveira Salazar. Most Portuguese migrants settled in and around Toronto.

Diplomatic relations between Canada and Portugal were established in January 1952, with both nations opening embassies in their hosts' capitals. In November 1972, Canada condemned the Portuguese Colonial Wars in Angola, Mozambique and in Portuguese Guinea.

In October 1982, Portuguese Prime Minister Francisco Pinto Balsemão paid an official visit to Canada, the first Portuguese head of government to do so. In November 2010, Canadian Prime Minister Stephen Harper visited Portugal to attend the 2010 Lisbon summit. In 2018, Portuguese Prime Minister António Costa paid an official visit to Canada and met with Prime Minister Justin Trudeau. There have been several high-level visits between the leaders of the two nations.

In 2022, the nations celebrated 70 years of diplomatic relations.

== High-level visits ==
High-level visits from Canada to Portugal

- Prime Minister Stephen Harper (2010)
- Prime Minister Justin Trudeau (2025)

High-level visits from Portugal to Canada

- Foreign Minister Paulo Cunha (1951)
- Prime Minister Francisco Pinto Balsemão (1982)
- Prime Minister Cavaco Silva (1992)
- President Jorge Sampaio (2001)
- Prime Minister José Manuel Barroso (2003)
- Prime Minister António Costa (2018)

== Bilateral agreements ==
Both nations have signed several bilateral agreements (with the United Kingdom signing some initial agreements on Canada's behalf) such as an Agreement of Mutual Surrender of Fugitive Criminals (1894); Agreement of Cooperation in Legal Proceedings in Civil and Commercial Matters (1935); Trade Agreement (1954); Agreement on Non-Immigrant Visa Arrangements (1958); Agreement on Mutual Fishery Relations (1977); Agreement on Social Security (1981); Agreement on Air transportation (1987); Agreement to avoid double taxation and prevent tax evasion in terms of income taxes (1999); and an Agreement on Mutual Assistance in Criminal Matters (2000).

== Transportation ==
There are direct flights between Canada and Portugal with the following airlines: Air Canada, Air Transat, Azores Airlines and TAP Air Portugal.

== Trade ==
In 2016, Canada signed a free trade agreement with the European Union, of which Portugal is a member. In 2024, bilateral trade between Canada and Portugal totaled $3.2 billion CAD. Canada's exports to Portugal amounted to $382 million CAD. Oilseeds, aircraft and parts, cereals and leguminous vegetables; were among the leading export goods from Canada to Portugal. Imports from Portugal in 2018 amounted to $635 million. Beverages (wine), apparel, organic chemicals, footwear, furniture, electronics and electrical machinery and equipment were among the leading imports from Portugal to Canada.

== Resident diplomatic missions ==
of Canada in Portugal

- Lisbon (Embassy)

of Portugal in Canada

- Ottawa (Embassy)
- Montreal (Consulate-General)
- Toronto (Consulate-General)
- Vancouver (Consulate-General)

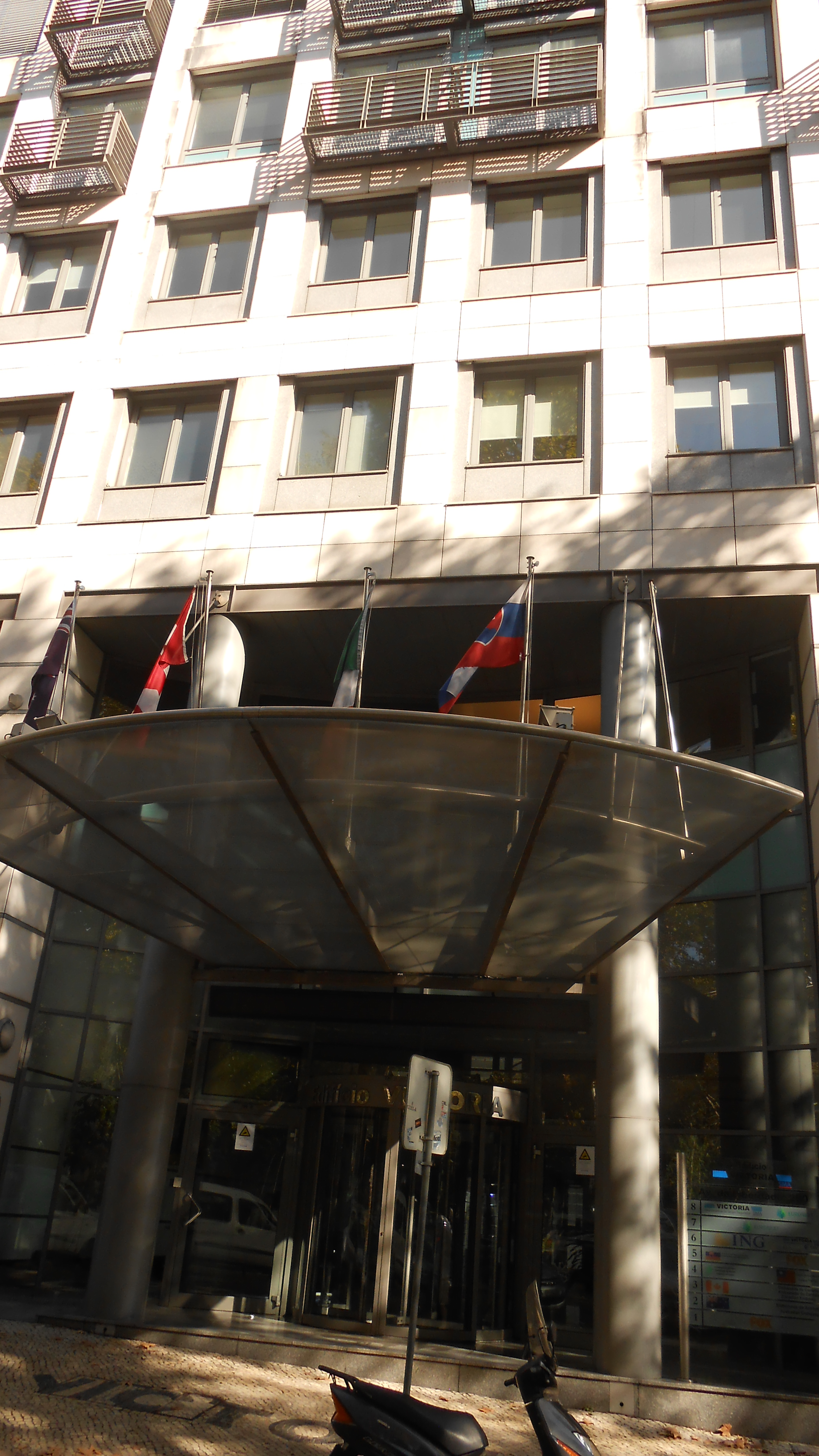
Building hosting the Embassy of Canada in Lisbon

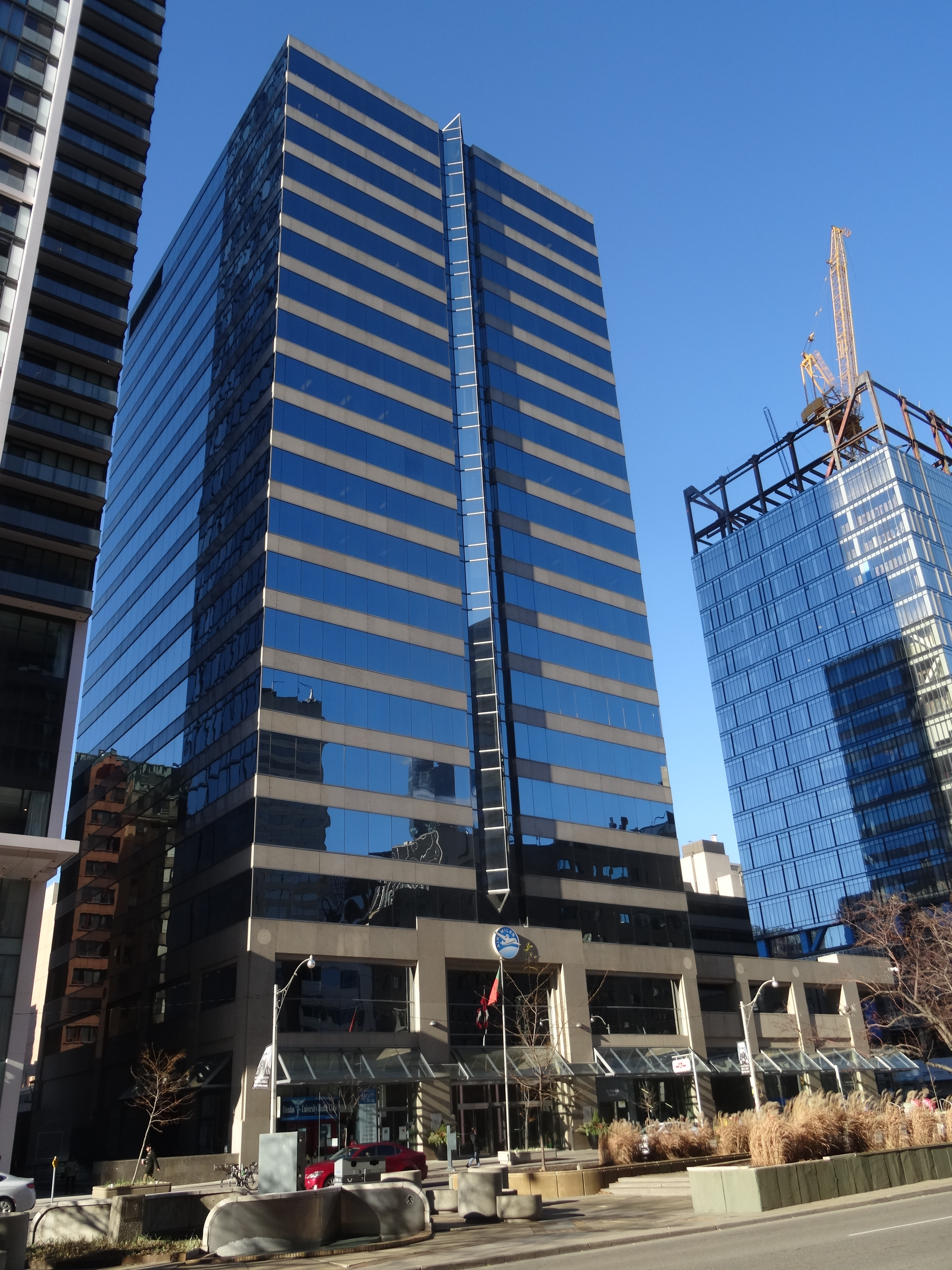
Building hosting the Consulate-General of Portugal in Toronto

== See also ==
- Foreign relations of Canada
- Foreign relations of Portugal
- Canada-EU relations
- NATO-EU relations
- Comprehensive Economic and Trade Agreement
- Little Portugal, Montreal
- Little Portugal, Toronto
- Portuguese Canadians
