= Portuguese Canadians =

Canadians of Portuguese birth or descent

Luso-canadianos (Portuguese) Canadiens portugais (French)
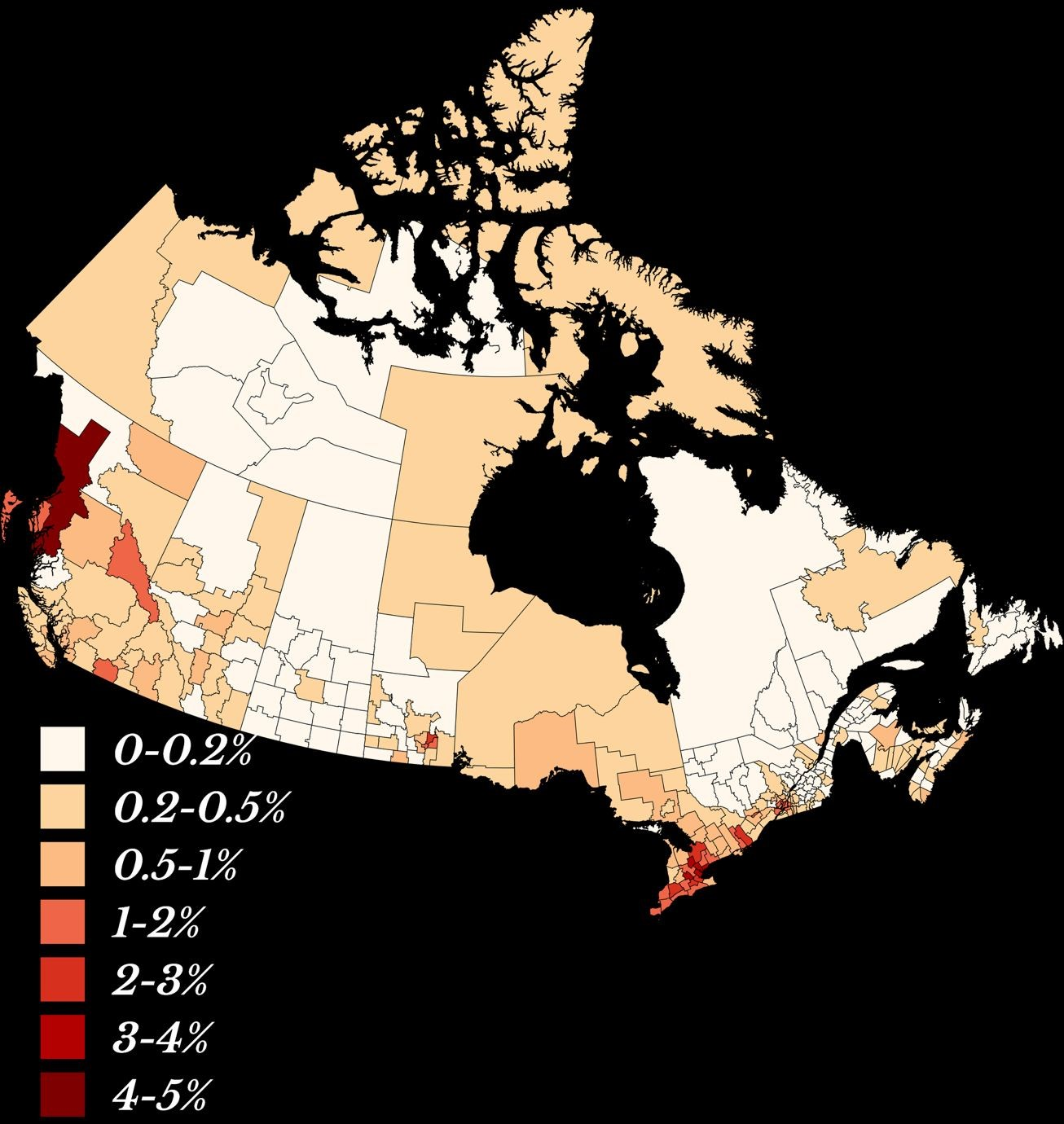
- Population distribution of Portuguese Canadians by census division, 2021 census

Total population
- 448,310 (by ancestry, 2021 census)

Regions with significant populations
- Toronto 85,165 Vancouver, British Columbia 22,765; Brampton, Ontario 22,700; Calgary, Alberta 6,170; Edmonton, Alberta 5,550; Bradford, Ontario 2,580; Halifax, Nova Scotia 1,435 Cambridge, Ontario: 10,685; Hamilton, Ontario: 14,110; Davenport, Toronto; Harrow, Ontario; Kingston, Ontario; Kitchener, Ontario: 17,220; Laval, Quebec; London, Ontario: 10,525; Mississauga, Ontario: 31,795; Montreal, Quebec: 46,535; New Westminster, British Columbia; Winnipeg, Manitoba: 30,000; Ottawa, Ontario: 9,910; Sault Ste. Marie, Ontario; St. John's, Newfoundland and Labrador; Strathroy, Ontario; Victoria, British Columbia Waterloo, Ontario

Languages
- Predominantly Canadian English, Quebec French and Portuguese and/or its dialects, Porglish

Religion
- Predominantly Roman Catholic

Portuguese Canadians (Portuguese: luso-canadianos) are Canadian citizens of full or partial Portuguese heritage or people who migrated from Portugal and reside in Canada. According to the 2021 Census, there were 448,310 or 1.21% of Canadians claimed full or partial Portuguese ancestry, a decrease compared to 482,110 in 2016 (1.40% of the nation's total population).

Most Portuguese Canadians live in Ontario - 300,600 (67.05%), followed by Quebec 64,385 (14.36%) and British Columbia 39,755 (8.87%).

== History of the Portuguese in Canada ==
=== First contacts during the Age of Discovery ===
Portugal played a pioneering role in the explorations of the New World in the 15th and 16th centuries. In the 15th century, Prince Henry of Portugal, better known as Henry the Navigator, established a school of navigation in Sagres, in the Algarve region of Portugal. From this school emerged explorers who found their way to the Indies, South America, North America and Africa, including the Portuguese João Fernandes Lavrador, who was the first explorer of Labrador, and Gaspar Corte-Real, who was also one of the earliest European explorers of Canada. Corte-Real explored the northeast coast of "Terra Nova", naming Conception Bay, Portugal Cove, and Labrador, named after Fernandes Lavrador. Recent historiography suggests Corte Real May have reached Canadian coasts in 1473, before Columbus officially "discovered" America. It is nonetheless worth noting that historical evidence from the early Age of Discovery is lacking.

Around 1521, João Álvares Fagundes was granted donatary rights to the inner islands of the Gulf of St. Lawrence and also created a settlement on Cape Breton Island to serve as a base for cod fishing. In 1524 the cartographer Estêvão Gomes traveled along the coasts of northeastern North America. During his journey, he possibly reached the Cabot Strait and Cape Breton, in the present-day Nova Scotia.

Pressure from natives and competing European fisheries prevented a permanent establishment and was abandoned five years later. Several attempts to establish settlements in Newfoundland over the next half-century also failed.

=== 16th–19th centuries ===
In the early 1600s Mathieu Da Costa was probably the first black person setting foot in modern-day Canadian territory.

In 1705, the Portuguese Pedro da Silva became the first post courier in the French territory of North America, New France. He settled in the Canadian part of the territory.

In addition, Esther Brandeau, of Sephardic descent is notable in the history of the Jews in Canada as the first Jew to set foot in the country, travelling from France to New France. Portuguese and Spanish Sephardic Jews also contributed founding the oldest Jewish congregation in Canada, establishing Montréal synagogue in 1778.

=== 20th century: large-scale emigration ===
During the 1950s, a large number of immigrants from the Azores and Madeira, fleeing political conflict with the regime of António de Oliveira Salazar, moved into the downtown core of Canada's major cities such as the area of Portugal Village in Toronto, Ontario and further west along Dundas Street to Brockton Village. The stretch of Dundas Street passing through Brockton Village is also known as "Rua Açores". Many other Portuguese have immigrated to Montreal since the 1960s. As well, Portuguese emigrants settled in areas of British Columbia from the mid 1950s onwards, including Vancouver and Kitimat where they worked in the lumber and smelting industries, and the Okanagan Valley in the interior of the province, where many became orchard farmers. From the 1970s, increasing numbers of Brazilians moved into the Portugal Village, Toronto.

Recently, a number of Canadians of Goan heritage have opted to pursue Portuguese citizenship they are entitled to through their heritage as a result of Goa being an overseas province of Portugal until 1961, thus adding to the Portuguese Canadian population in Canada.

== Demographics ==
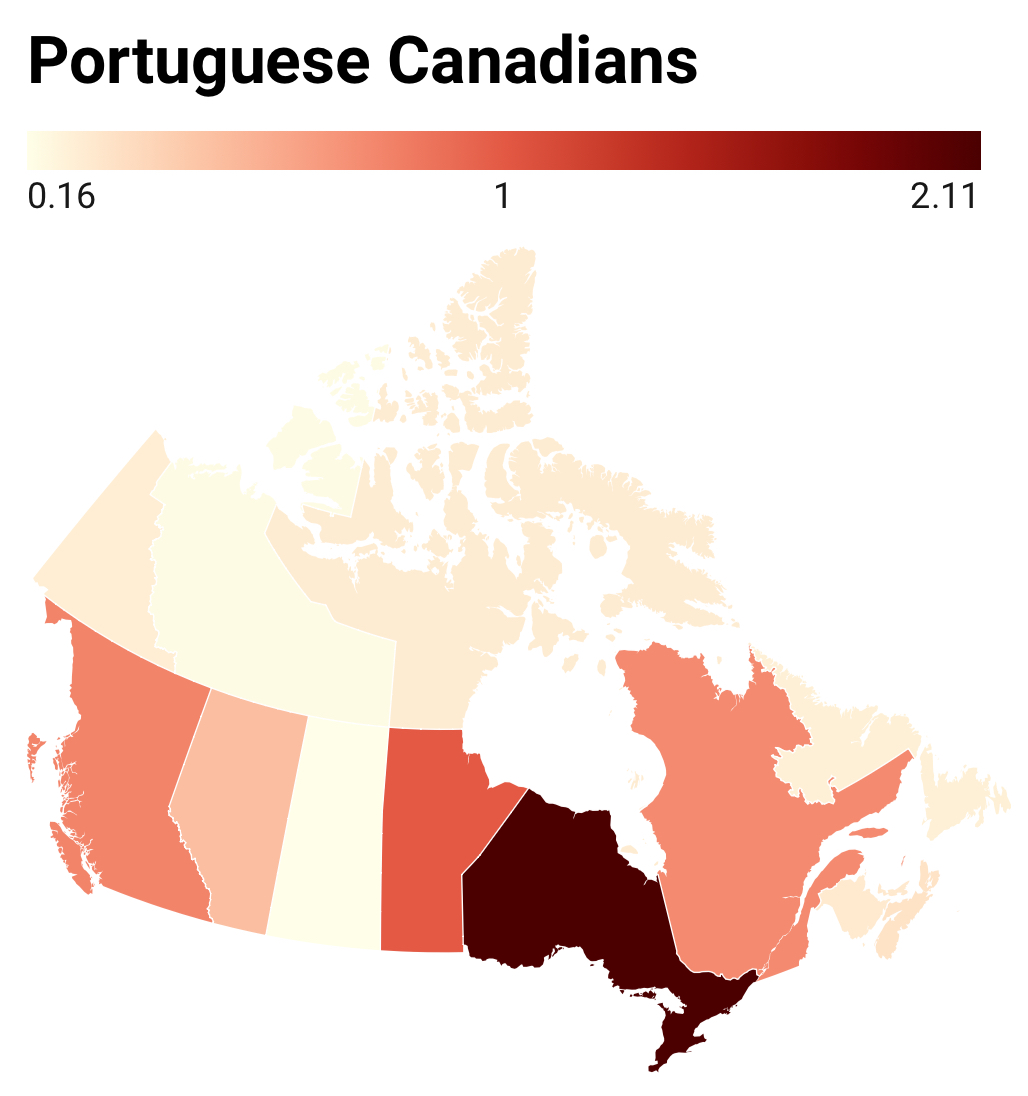
Portuguese percent in Canadian province/territory, 2021 census

The vast majority of Portuguese Canadians reside in the Greater Toronto area. Including 85,000 in the City of Toronto, and 30,000 in Missisauga.

Brampton Ontario and Kitchener Ontario also contain large Portuguese Canadian Communities.

Montreal has the second most populous number of Portuguese immigrants with an estimated 47,000. Most started immigrating in the 1960s and settled in the Le Plateau-Mont-Royal mainly around Saint Laurent Boulevard and Rachel Street. Many Portuguese stores and restaurants are located in Little Portugal.

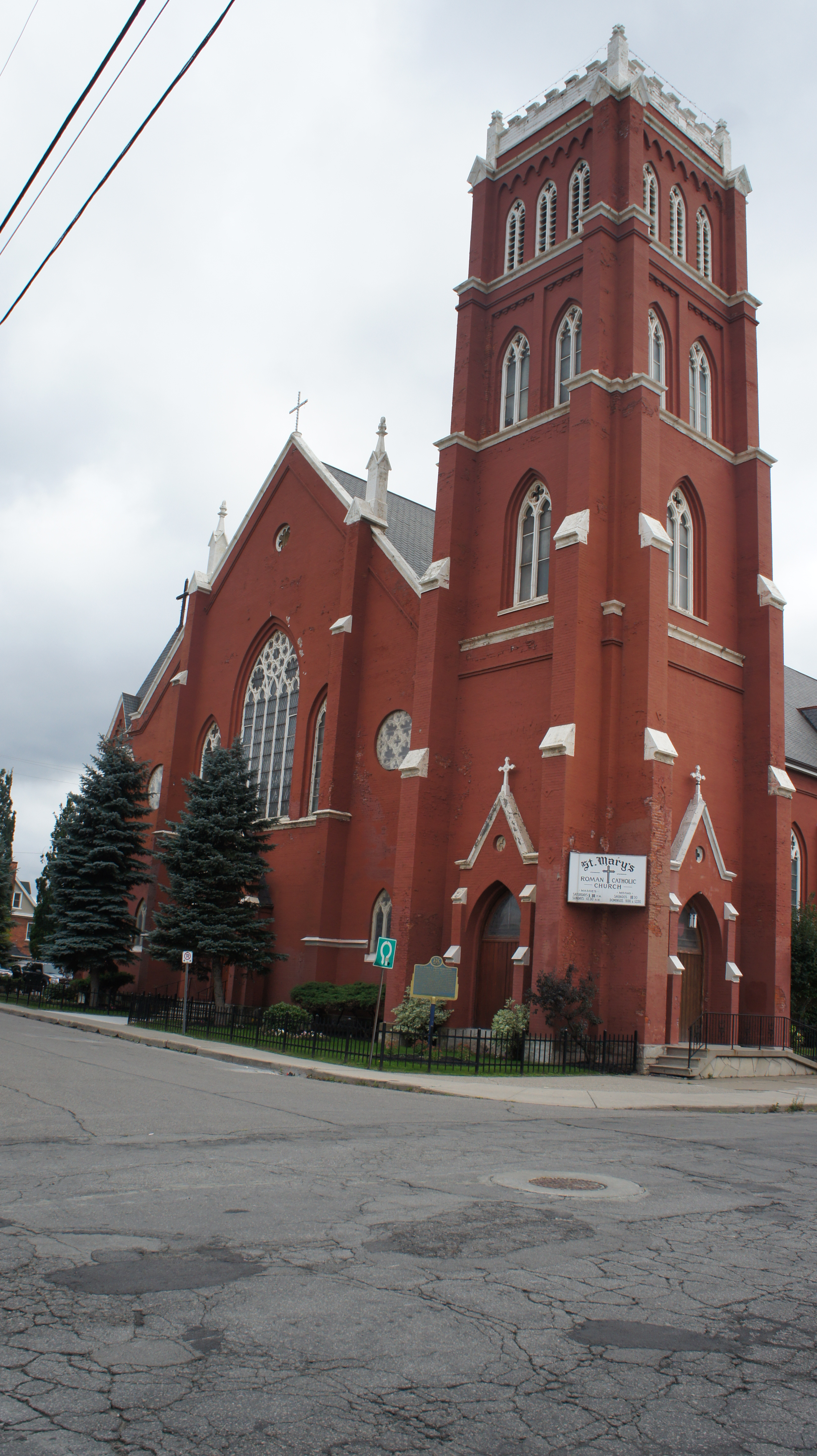
St Mary's Pro-Cathedral Hamilton

Hamilton, Ontario also has a solid Portuguese community concentrated in the downtown core around Barton and James Street and nearby the St. Mary's Roman Catholic church. This area in Hamilton is known as "Jamesville" and is shared with a neighbouring Italian population. London, Ontario's significant Portuguese community is concentrated in the east end and south end of the city, with Portuguese restaurants and shops situated on Hamilton Road.

=== The Portuguese in British Columbia ===
The first recorded Portuguese individual to immigrate to British Columbia was "Portuguese Joe" Silvie, from Pico Island. He arrived in BC around 1858 via California, after years in the American whaling industry. He married Khaltinaht a daughter of Grand Chief Kiapilano, and their daughter was the first child born in Vancouver of European origin, Elizabeth Walker (née Silvey). They lived in a cabin built in what is now Stanley Park and he ran Vancouver's second saloon, and was a fisherman as well. However his wife died in 1871, and in years later married a shíshálh woman named Kwaham Kwatleematt (Lucy). They later moved to Reid Island where their family grew to 10 children. Portuguese Joe died in 1902, and has approximately 500 descendant. A statue in his memory now stands in Stanley Park, meters away from the totem pole display.

British Columbia has around 35 000 Portuguese-Canadians, concentrated in the Lower Mainland (Vancouver, Surrey, Richmond, Burnaby, Delta, Coquitlam) with around 20 000 Portuguese Canadians. Other centres for Portuguese immigrants and their descendants are Kitimat, Prince Rupert, Victoria, and the Okanagan region where many are fruit farmers. Many are of Azorean heritage.

In Vancouver there is a Portuguese Catholic Church, Portuguese Canadian Senior's Society, Portuguese Brotherhood of the Divine Holy Spirit with members originally from Flores Island, Azores and São Miguel Island, Tradition of Terceira (Tradição da Terceira), Friends of Pico (Amigos do Pico), and several folk dance groups, including. Cruz de Cristo (regions of Mainland Portugal), Pico, Sao Miguel Island and Madeira.

=== Portuguese Canadians by Canadian province or territory (2021) ===
Province	Population	Percentage	Percentage of Single ethnic or cultural origin responses
Ontario	300,600	2.11%	57.62%
Quebec	64,385	0.76%	51.77%
British Columbia	39,755	0.79%	37.77%
Alberta	21,415	0.50%	36.73%
Manitoba	13,395	1.00%	54.95%
Nova Scotia	2,990	0.31%	22.24%
New Brunswick	2,095	0.27%	19.09%
Saskatchewan	1,760	0.16%	23.30%
Newfoundland and Labrador	1,215	0.24%	18.11%
Prince Edward Island	425	0.28%	30.59%
Yukon	100	0.25%	55.00%
Nunavut	95	0.26%	15.79%
Northwest Territories	75	0.18%	13.33%
Canada	448,310	1.21%	53.23%

== Cultural Impact ==
=== 2003 Celebrations ===
The Portuguese Canadian community chose 2003 as the year to celebrate the 50th anniversary of their officially sponsored immigration to Canada. The Honourable David Collenette, Minister of Transport and Minister Responsible for Canada Post, said that "the Portuguese Canadian community is a vibrant group that enriches the Canadian mosaic with its history, language, culture and work ethic." He added that Canada Post was proud to be issuing a stamp honouring Portuguese Canadians during the month of June, when cultural celebrations honouring the life of 16th-century poet Luís de Camões, considered Portugal's greatest poet, were taking place in many communities across the country.

=== Portuguese language ===
In addition, the Portuguese brought with them their language. Despite the geographical distance between the two countries, interest towards the language remains vivid and has recently experienced a renewed interest.

According to recent statistics, more than 330,000 Canadians can speak Portuguese, accounting to approximately 1% of the country's population. Portuguese language is amongst the most notable cultural contributions Portuguese have brought to Canada, contributing to the enrichment and adding to the diversity of the country.

=== Holy Spirit Societies (Irmandades do Divino Espirito Santo) ===
As Azoreans came to Canada from 1953 into the 1970s, numerous Holy Spirit Societies, reminiscent of the spiritual celebration of the Holy Spirit and cultural tradition present in each village in the Azores Islands, were set up by individuals from the community coming together. They participate in the International Conference of the Festivals of the Holy Spirit, which united Azorean communities around the world yearly.

== Notable Portuguese Canadians ==
=== Athletes and sportspeople ===
- Fernando Aguiar, soccer player
- Kevin Alves, figure skater
- Stephen Ames, professional golfer
- Justin Azevedo, ice hockey player
- Tristan Borges, soccer player
- Mike Benevides, head coach of the BC Lions
- Meaghan Benfeito, Olympic team diver
- Johnathan Cabral, hurdler
- António Carvalho, mixed martial artist
- Dylan DeMelo, ice hockey player
- Zachary Claman DeMelo, IndyCar driver
- Brenden Dillon, ice hockey player, New Jersey Devils
- Drew Doughty, ice hockey player, Los Angeles Kings
- Marc Dos Santos, head coach, Vancouver Whitecaps FC
- Stephen Eustáquio, soccer player
- Jordan Faria, soccer player, Valour FC
- Ben Ferreira, retired figure skater
- Ricardo Ferreira, soccer player
- Daniel Fernandes, soccer player
- Manny Fernandez, ice hockey player
- Marcus Godinho, soccer player
- Gage Goncalves, ice hockey player, Tampa Bay Lightning
- Julia Grosso, soccer player
- Adam Henrique, ice hockey player, New Jersey Devils
- Kequyen Lam, cross country skiing
- Priscilla Lopes-Schliep, hurdler
- Steve Martins, retired ice hockey player for the Hartford Whalers, Carolina Hurricanes, Tampa Bay Lightning
- Jason Medeiros, football player
- Zackary Medeiros, football player
- Tony Menezes, retired professional soccer player
- Matthew Nogueira, soccer player
- Pedro Pacheco, soccer player
- Ryan Raposo, soccer player, Los Angeles FC
- Mike Ribeiro, ice hockey player, Nashville Predators
- Evan Rodrigues, ice hockey player, Florida Panthers
- Dylan Sacramento, soccer player
- Alex Silva, professional wrestler
- John Tavares, ice hockey player drafted first overall in the 2009 NHL entry draft by the New York Islanders
- John Tavares, retired lacrosse player
- Emanuel Viveiros, retired ice hockey player, Minnesota North Stars
- Matthew Sarmento, field hockey player, Canada
- Steven Vitória, soccer player

=== Film and television ===
- Scott Cavalheiro, actor
- Luisa D'Oliveira, actress, The 100
- Tasha de Vasconcelos, actress and model
- Priscilla Faia, actress, Rookie Blue
- Laysla De Oliveira, actress, Locke & Key, Lioness
- Louis Ferreira, actor, Bad Blood, The Man in the High Castle
- Katie Findlay, actress, Man Seeking Woman, The Killing
- P. J. Marcellino, film director, film producer, journalist
- Ramona Milano, actress, Due South, Degrassi: The Next Generation
- Jon Paul Piques, internet celebrity
- Percy Rodriguez, actor, Peyton Place, Heavy Metal
- Jess Salgueiro, actress, Tiny Pretty Things, Jupiter's Legacy
- Sid Seixeiro, television and radio broadcaster
- Luis Sequeira, costume designer

=== Historical figures ===
- Marie-Joseph Angélique, enslaved person, convicted of starting the Montreal fire of 1734
- Mathieu da Costa, translator for Samuel de Champlain, first free Black person to come to Canada
- Pedro da Silva, first post courier in New France

=== Literature ===
- Cody Caetano, writer
- Paulo da Costa, poet and short story writer
- Irene Marques, poet, novelist and professor of literature at TMU Toronto
- Anthony Oliveira, author, journalist and pop culture critic
- Anthony de Sá, novelist and short story writer
- Erika de Vasconcelos, novelist

=== Music ===
- Keshia Chanté, singer, songwriter, and actress
- Pedro Costa, singer-songwriter
- Shawn Desman, pop singer and dancer
- John Estacio, contemporary opera composer
- Danny Fernandes, pop and R&B singer
- Melanie Fiona, pop and R&B singer
- Nelly Furtado, singer, songwriter, and actress
- Anthony Gomes, blues and blues-rock guitarist and singer
- Tobias Jesso Jr., singer-songwriter
- Ashley Leitão, contestant, Canadian Idol, member, Braided
- Brian Melo, winner of Canadian Idol, season five
- Shawn Mendes, singer and songwriter
- Nico Paulo, singer-songwriter
- Armando Santiago, composer and conductor
- Lucas Silveira, singer/guitarist, The Cliks
- Matthew Tavares, guitarist, keyboardist and record producer (BadBadNotGood)

=== Politics and government ===
- Horacio Arruda, National Director of Public Health for Quebec
- Ana Bailão, Toronto City Councillor for (Ward 18) Davenport
- Paul Ferreira, former MPP for York South—Weston
- Peter Fonseca, MP for Mississauga East—Cooksville
- Carlos Leitão, MNA for Robert-Baldwin
- Belinda Karahalios, MPP for Cambridge
- Keith Martin, physician and former MP for Esquimalt—Juan de Fuca
- Cristina Martins, former MPP for Davenport
- Alexandra Mendès, MP for Brossard—Saint-Lambert
- John Rodriguez, former Mayor of Sudbury and MP for Nickel Belt
- Mario Silva, former MP for Davenport
- Charles Sousa, former MPP for Mississauga South and Ontario Minister of Finance, current MP for Mississauga—Lakeshore and Parliamentary Secretary to the Minister of Public Services and Procurement

=== Other ===
- Emanuel Jaques, victim of a high profile murder

== Organizations ==
Some Portuguese-Canadians adopt the name "Luso-Canadians" for their local social and business clubs, in reference to Lusitania, the ancient name associated with Portugal under the Roman Empire (and nowadays used in the Portuguese language as a synonym for "Portuguese". The attendance growth of organizations indicate the growth in small business and universities throughout the community. They have also established a Portuguese-language TV channel serving the community. The sense of community is strong and the Portuguese have established many cultural societies in Canadian soil

Leading as a national voice, one can find the "Congresso", the Luso-Canadiano National Congress.

=== Club associations ===
- Alliance of Portuguese Clubs & Associations of Ontario (ACAPO)
- Portuguese Cultural Centre of BC, formally Vancouver Portuguese Seniors Society, located in Burnaby, BC.

=== Clubs ===
- First Portuguese Canadian Cultural Centre
- Associação Cultural do Minho de Toronto (ACMT)
- Canadian Madeira Club - Toronto, Ontario
- Northern Portugal Cultural Centre - Oshawa, Ontario
- Banda do Sagrado Coração de Jesus - Toronto, Ontario
- Portuguese Cultural Centre of British Columbia
- Portuguese Cultural Centre of Mississauga
- Luso-Can Tuna

=== Portuguese-Canadian Religious organizations ===
- Our Lady of Fatima Portuguese Parish, Vancouver, BC
- Irmandade Portuguesa do Divino Espirito Santo Cultural Society of BC, founded in 1968 in New Westminster by Azorean immigrants.

=== Sports ===
- The Portuguese Canadian Golfers Association - Toronto, Ontario
- SC Toronto

=== Portuguese-Canadian business groups ===
- Federation of Portuguese-Canadian Business and Professionals

=== Portuguese-Canadian educational groups ===
- University of Toronto Portuguese Association (UTPA)
- York University Portuguese Association (YUPA)

=== Portuguese-Canadian ethnic cultural parks ===
- Madeira Park - Georgina, Ontario

== Portuguese publications ==
Numerous media outlets have been established to serve the Portuguese Canadian community, primarily in the Toronto-area.

=== Newspapers and magazines ===
- Correio da Manhã Canadá – Canadian version of the Portuguese daily newspaper Correio da Manhã launched in 2012.
- Luso Life – Quarterly lifestyle magazine published by MDC Media Group in Toronto.
- Milénio Stadium– Weekly Portuguese newspaper published in Toronto. Founded in 1990 by Alexandre Franco and Margarida Mil-homens, sold to MDC Media Group in 2017.
- Senso Magazine– Monthly magazine published in Toronto
- Senso Magazine Classifieds– Online classifieds platform associated with Senso Magazine published in Toronto
- Portuguese Post– Online news associated with Senso Magazine published in Toronto
- Portugal News – news from Portugal, in English and Portuguese
- Sol Português - weekly Portuguese newspaper published in Toronto between 1983 and 2023.
- Voice - weekly Portuguese newspaper published in Toronto between 1989 and 2020. In the late 2000s, the newspaper was acquired by the owners of Sol.
- A Voz de Portugal - weekly Portuguese newspaper published in Montreal from 1961.

=== Radio ===
- CIRV-FM - a Toronto-area multicultural station launched by Francisco Alvarez in 1986 primarily targeting the Portuguese community. In November 2016, South Asian Broadcasting Corporation Inc. acquired the station and relaunched it in 2019, with Portuguese programming mainly airing on an HD Radio sub-station.
- CHIN-FM - Toronto-area multicultural station owned by CHIN Radio/TV International with notable Portuguese-language content.
- Camões Radio - An online radio station launched by MDC Media Group in 2013. Some of the station's programming is aired on CHHA.
- CMC Radio - A daily programming block operated by Correio da Manhã Canadá that launched on November 16, 2026 on CHHA.

=== Television ===
- Gente da Nossa - Weekly cultural magazine created by Caesar Pedro and hosted by Nellie Pedro, debuting on Graham Cable in 1987, before moving to Citytv in 1989. In 2006, an English-language companion program Bom Dia was launched on A Channel to highlight the community. It later changed formats to a Portuguese production and airs following the flagship program. As of 2023, both series air on TLN.
- FPTV - Television channel launched in 2001, by CIRV-FM founder Francisco Alvarez.
- CMTV - Canadian affiliate of the Portuguese television channel spun-off from the Correio da Manhã newspaper in 2017. A recap series Correio Da Manhã Em Destaque began airing on Citytv in 2019.
- Camões TV - Television channel launched in 2019 by MDC Media Group. The brand debuted the year prior as a television show initially aired on Global Durham before expanding to Citytv in 2023.
- Portuguese-language programming is also aired on Omni 1. The channel has produced the interview series Nos Portugueses and the weekly current affairs show Focus Portuguese since 2015 and 2017, respectively. It had previously produced a daily Portuguese news cast and has broadcast various telenovelas from Brazil and Portugal.

== See also ==
- Canada–Portugal relations
- European Canadians
- List of Portuguese people
- Little Portugal, Toronto
- Little Portugal, Montreal
- Portuguese Americans
  - List of Portuguese Americans
- Portuguese British
  - List of Portuguese Britons
- Portuguese colonization of the Americas
