= CIRV-FM =

Ethnic radio station in Toronto

Coordinates: 43°38′56″N 79°22′54″W

- Toronto, Ontario; Canada
- Frequency: 88.9 MHz
- Branding: RED FM 88.9

Programming
- Format: Hindi Punjabi music; HD2: Portuguese; HD3: Tamil; HD4: Farsi

Ownership
- Owner: South Asian Broadcasting Corporation Inc.

History
- First air date: 1986
- Former frequencies: 88.7 MHz (1986–1993)

Technical information
- Class: B
- ERP: 1,800 watts average 4,180 watts peak
- HAAT: 315.4 metres (1,035 ft)

Links
- Webcast: Listen Live; Listen Live (HD2); Listen Live (HD4)
- Website: redfm.ca thaalam.fm (HD3) radioarina.ca (HD4)

Logo prior to 2019 rebranding

Fairchild Radio logo

CIRV-FM is a Canadian radio station, broadcasting at 88.9 FM in Toronto, Ontario. The station airs a multicultural programming format. CIRV's studios are located in Brampton, while its transmitter is located atop First Canadian Place in Toronto's Financial District. Matching sister stations CKYE-FM and CKYR-FM, it rebranded itself in 2019 as RED FM with Red standing for "Reflecting Ethnic Diversity". The station's main channel predominantly carries musical programming in Punjabi, Hindi, and Urdu.

== History ==
Founded by Portuguese Canadian Francisco Alvarez, the station launched in 1986 at FM 88.7, and moved to its current frequency in 1993. Since the move, it was branded on-air as CIRV Radio International FM 88.9 Toronto. The station's studios were originally based at Dundas Street West in the Trinity-Bellwoods neighbourhood of Toronto. CIRV's initial programming was predominantly in Portuguese, with Spanish as well as Chinese (Cantonese and Mandarin) content joining the schedule in later years. Select shows also targeted Brazilian, Caribbean, Punjabi, Russian, Ukrainian and Urdu communities.

In November 2016, South Asian Broadcasting Corporation Inc. acquired the station. Alvarez continues to operate the FPTV channel. In September 2018, the station launched HD Radio multi-casting services with additional programming on sub-stations. The studio moved to Brampton in early 2019. This was followed by an on-air relaunch as Red FM on April 15, 2019. The re-brand came with a shift in programming focus to Punjabi, Hindi and Urdu music from 4 am to midnight. Material targeting other ethnic groups remains on the schedule in a diminished capacity and is also available on the station's three sub-channels. The CIRV-FM brand is still used on the station's multiplex sub-channels, including HD2 where it runs a 24/7 Portuguese format and HD3 which has Tamil-language programming.
