= Mathew V =

Canadian pop singer

Mathew van Vooght, known by the stage name Mathew V, is a Canadian pop singer from Delta, British Columbia. He is most noted for his 2021 EP The Outer Circle, which was a Juno Award nominee for Adult Contemporary Album of the Year at the Juno Awards of 2022.

Following high school, van Vooght moved to London, England to study classical music at the European Institute of Contemporary Music, but dropped out after several months, and instead spent time working on music in the city's live music scene before returning to Vancouver a year later. He signed to 604 Records, and released his debut EP Sounds in 2016.

In 2017 he released the single "Tell Me Smooth", a preview of his 2018 full-length album The Fifth. The song spent 14 weeks on the Canadian hot adult contemporary radio charts in Billboard; after he unexpectedly saw drag queen Ilona Verley perform "Tell Me Smooth" as a lipsync number at a Vancouver drag show, he cast Verley in the video for his 2018 single "Broken".

He followed up with the album Two Faced in 2020, and The Outer Circle followed in 2021.

He is a frequent collaborator with Luca Fogale, a fellow Juno nominee in 2022.

He is out as queer.
