= Nuela Charles =

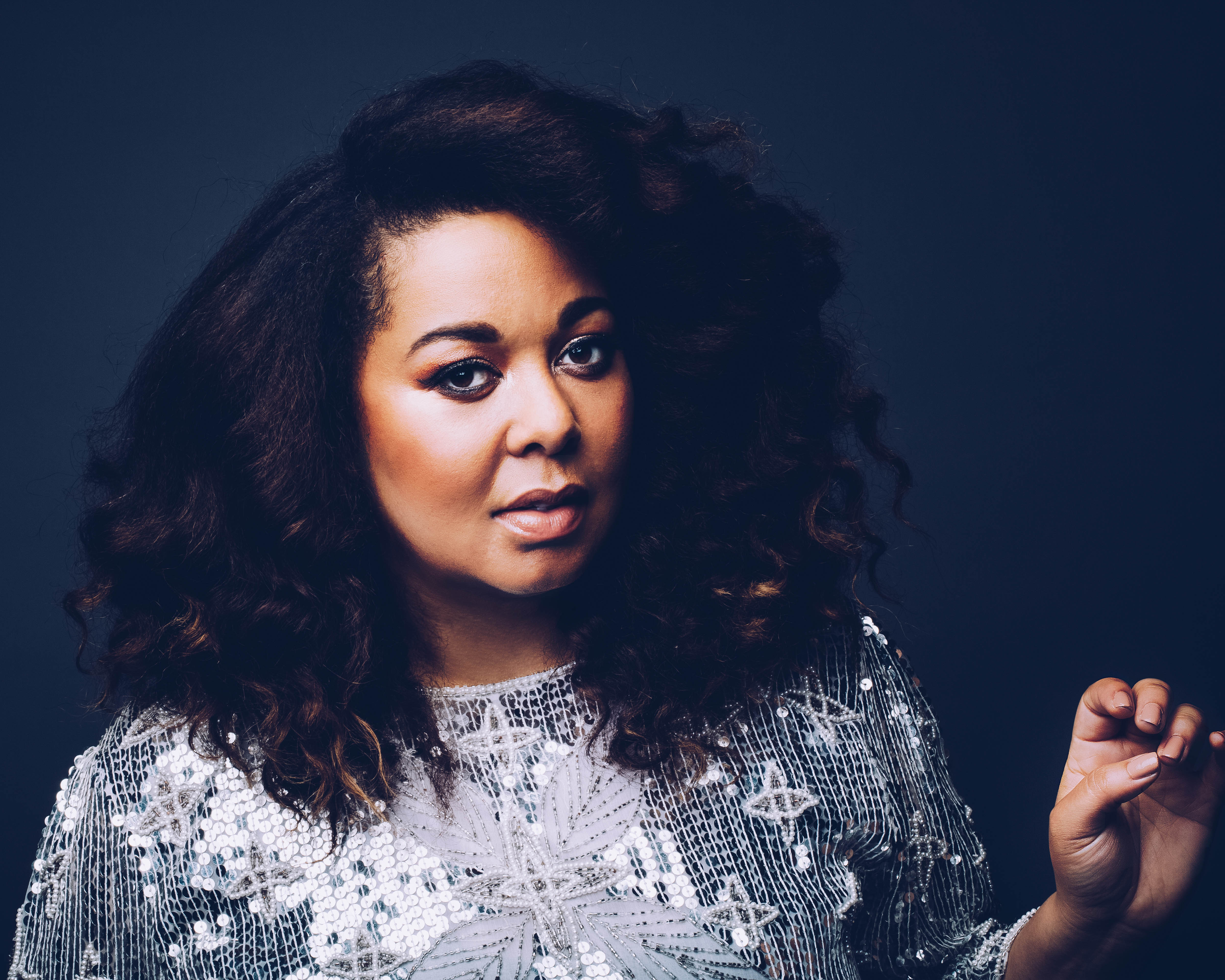

Background information
- Born: Manuela Wüthrich; Kenya
- Origin: Edmonton, Alberta, Canada
- Genres: Pop, soul, r&b, jazz, hip hop
- Occupations: Singer, songwriter
- Instrument: vocals
- Years active: 2012–present
- Website: nuelacharles.com

Manuela Wüthrich, who goes by the stage name Nuela Charles, is a Canadian, Swiss, and Kenyan musician, who plays a style of soul, pop, r&b, jazz and hip hop music. She has released four musical works, Aware (2012), and the Juno nominated albums The Grand Hustle (2016), Distant Danger (2018), Melt (2019), and NU2U (2026).

== Life and career ==
Charles was born, Manuela Wüthrich, on 19 January, in Kenya. She graduated from Briercrest College and Seminary in 2008, and she identifies as a Christian.

Her music recording career started in 2012, with the studio album Aware, released on 23 October 2012. She released another studio album, The Grand Hustle, on 4 November 2016.

== Discography ==
- Aware (23 October 2012)
- The Grand Hustle (4 November 2016)
- Distant Danger (19 October 2018)
- Melt (8 November 2019)
- Blissful Madness EP (30 April 2021)
- Nuela Charles (16 September 2022)
- NU2U (24 October 2025)

== Awards and nominations ==
Year	Organization	Award	Artist/work	Result	Ref.
2013	Western Canadian Music Awards	Urban Recording of the Year	Aware	Nominated	
2013	Edmonton Music Prize	Album of the Year	Aware	Winner	
2014	SiriusXM Indie Awards	R&B/Soul Artist of the Year	Nuela Charles	Nominated	
2017	Western Canadian Music Awards	Urban Artist of the Year	Nuela Charles	Winner	
2017	Western Canadian Music Awards	Video of the Year	"Crumbling Down"	Nominated	
2017	Edmonton Music Prize	Album of the Year	The Grand Hustle	Runner-up	
2018	Juno Awards	Adult Contemporary Album of the Year	The Grand Hustle	Nominated	
2018	Edmonton Music Prize	Album of the Year	Distant Danger	Runner-up	
2019	Juno Awards	Adult Contemporary Album of the Year	Distant Danger	Nominated	
2020	Juno Awards	Adult Contemporary Album of the Year	Melt	Nominated	
2020	Western Canadian Music Awards	Pop Artist of the Year	Melt	Winner	
2022	Western Canadian Music Awards	Pop Artist of the Year	Nuela Charles	Winner	
2026	JUNO Awards	Adult Contemporary Album of the Year	NU2U	Nominated	
2026	Western Canadian Music Awards	Pop Artist of the Year	NU2U	Nominated	
2026	Western Canadian Music Awards	Video of the Year	LIFE	Nominated	
