= Josh Sahunta =

Josh Sahunta is a Canadian pop and rhythm and blues singer from Edmonton, Alberta. His 2023 album To Be Loved, Vol. 1 received a Juno Award nomination for Adult Contemporary Album of the Year at the Juno Awards of 2024.

He was a top ten finalist in CBC Music's Searchlight competition in 2020.

He moved to Nashville, TN, in the United States beginning in June 2025 where he has led a successful career as both a producer with local artists and an artist touring with Jeremy Passion in 2025 as well as appearances at both NAMM and Key West Songwriters Festival in 2026. Song placements have included the Hannah Montana 20th Anniversary Special, Love is Blind, Love Island, and many others.
