= Aphrose =

Canadian singer

Aphrose is the stage name of Joanna Mohammed, a Canadian soul and rhythm and blues singer from Toronto, Ontario. She is most noted for her 2023 album Roses, which received a Juno Award nomination for Adult Contemporary Album of the Year at the Juno Awards of 2025.

A graduate of the music program at Humber College, she began her career as a backing vocalist for artists such as Daniel Caesar, Chantal Kreviazuk, Nikki Yanofsky and Jessie Reyez before releasing her debut album, Element, in 2019.
