= Darling the Dawn =

Studio album by All Hands_Make Light
- Released: April 21, 2023
- Recorded: 2022
- Studio: Thee Might Hotel2Tango, Montreal, Quebec, Canada
- Genre: Post-rock; shoegaze
- Length: 44:00
- Language: English
- Label: Constellation

All Hands_Make Light chronology
| All Hands_Make Light (2021) | "Darling the Dawn" (2023) |

"Darling the Dawn" is the debut studio album by Canadian post-rock duo All Hands_Make Light.

== Reception ==
A brief review for BrooklynVegan by Andrew Sacher considers this music a mixture of Broken Social Scene and Godspeed! You Black Emperor. Nicholas Sokic rated this release an 8 out of 10 for Exclaim!, writing that "the guitar-free, orchestral shoegaze is propped up by a treasure trove of Montreal's independent music scene". In Uncut, Sharon O'Connell gave Darling the Dawn a 7 out of 10, calling it "luminous" with "soundscapes that shift across drone, ancestral chant, shoegaze and a forlorn take on sacred music, lent extra otherworldly heft by Engle’s beauteous vocals".

The album was longlisted for the 2023 Polaris Music Prize.

== Track listing ==
1. "A Sparrows’ Lift" – 3:13
2. "We Live on a Fucking Planet and Baby That’s the Sun" – 10:07
3. "Waiting for the Light to Quit" – 4:46
4. "A Workers’ Graveyard (Poor Eternal)" – 3:07
5. "The Sons and Daughters of Poor Eternal" – 9:28
6. "Anchor" – 7:30
7. "Lie Down in Roses Dear" – 5:50

== Personnel ==
All Hands_Make Light

- Ariel Engle – vocals
- Efrim Manuel Menuck – instrumentation

Additional personnel

- Michele Fiedler Fuentes – artwork
- Jace Lasek – mixing
- Jessica Moss – violin
- Harris Newman – mastering
- Liam O’Neill – drums

== See also ==
- List of 2023 albums
