= Nico Paulo =

Portuguese-Canadian singer-songwriter

Nicole Maria Morgado Paulo, credited as Nico Paulo, is a Portuguese-Canadian singer-songwriter and designer. She is based in St. John's, Newfoundland and Labrador.

== Life and career ==
Paulo was born in Canada to Portuguese parents who returned to Portugal when she was two years old; she grew up in a small town called Bombarral, which is near Lisbon. She returned to Canada in 2014 as an adult to pursue a graduate internship in graphic design. A longtime hobby musician who had not actively pursued it as a career, Paulo turned more actively to music as a creative outlet after moving from Toronto, Ontario to St. John's, Newfoundland and Labrador in 2020. She has released two EPs, Wave Call in 2020 and Live at First Light in 2021.

Paulo's self-titled full-length debut album, produced by Joshua Van Tassel and Tim Baker, was released in April 2023; it was longlisted for the 2023 Polaris Music Prize.

Paulo has also contributed to Baker's albums as a designer and backing vocalist. She has also toured with Baker as a supporting musician.

In 2025, Paulo released a third EP titled Interval_o through Forward Music Group.
