= Good Luck (Debby Friday album) =

Studio album by Debby Friday
- Released: March 24, 2023
- Recorded: 2022
- Studio: Candle Recording Studio, Toronto, Ontario, Canada
- Genre: Electronic music
- Length: 33:16
- Language: English
- Label: Sub Pop
- Producer: Debby Friday; Graham Walsh

Debby Friday chronology
Death Drive (2019)	Good Luck (2023)

Good Luck is the debut studio album by Nigerian–Canadian electronic musician Debby Friday, released by Sub Pop on March 24, 2023. The album has received positive reviews from critics.

== Reception ==
Professional ratings
Aggregate scores
Source	Rating
AnyDecentMusic?	7.0/10 (5 reviews)
Metacritic	77/100 (8 reviews)
Review scores
Source	Rating
AllMusic	3.5/5 stars
The Daily Telegraph	4/5 stars
Exclaim!	8/10
Loud and Quiet	8/10
Slant Magazine	3.5/5 stars

Editors at AnyDecentMusic? rated this album a 7.0 out of 10, based on five reviews. Good Luck received positive reviews from critics noted at review aggregator Metacritic. It has a weighted average score of 77 out of 100, based on eight reviews.

Editors at AllMusic rated this album 3.5 out of 5 stars, with critic Paul Simpson writing that this is "a refinement of her style that reveals a wider array of emotions than" her previous EPs and the "music is always dramatic, honest, and futuristic". The Daily Telegraph scored this release 4 out of 5 stars, with reviewer Cat Woods writing that Friday has "got talent in spades" and favorably compares this work to Fatima Al Qadiri, Massive Attack, Santigold, and Yves Tumor. In Exclaim!, Chris Bryson gave this release an 8 out of 10 for "grounding duelling flames of love and longing, perseverance and grace, and life and death in genre-fluid experimentalism". Writing for Loud and Quiet—where this was named Album of the Week—Zara Hedderman gave Good Luck an 8 out of 10, summing up "if there’s only one thing to be said about Debby Friday’s poised debut it’s that she most certainly gave it all that she’s got".

The Quietus' Amanda Farah calls this "a debut album that bursts from the starting blocks with all guns blazing" that show's Friday's dedication as a musician, who can blend confidence with vulnerability in her lyrics. Writing for Resident Advisor, Kiana Mickles discusses the musician's lyricism, writing that she "explores her adolescence with gripping candour" and "the acute surrender of Friday's work evolves in Good Luck, where she takes a Jungian approach to her lyrics". Steve Erickson of Slant Magazine gave this work 3.5 out of 5 stars for being "an album that testifies to the liberating potential of making a racket". Editors at Stereogum chose this for Album of the Week and critic James Rettig writes that while there is "nothing necessarily groundbreaking" about the "in-your-face sonics" on this album it is "executed so well" that it will leave listeners feeling several emotions. In a June round-up of the best albums of 2023, the publication placed this at 27, with critic James Rettig writing that this is "built for the club, a space where those differences strobe into transcendence, and she offers up enough pulse-pounding jams and sticky synth quivers to keep us wanting more".

The album was the winner of the 2023 Polaris Music Prize. In Exclaim!, this was rated the 10th best album of 2023. This was included in the 40 best independent albums of 2023 in BrooklynVegan's Indie Basement.

== Track listing ==
1. "Good Luck" – 3:10
2. "So Hard to Tell" – 3:05
3. "I Got It" – 3:48
4. "Hot Love"" – 3:23
5. "Heartbreakerrr" – 3:11
6. "What a Man" – 3:23
7. "Safe" – 4:07
8. "Let U Down" – 5:07
9. "Pluto Baby" – 2:08
10. "Wake Up" – 1:53

== Personnel ==
- Debby Friday – instrumentation, vocals, mixing, production
- Heba Kadry – mastering
- Uñas – vocals on "I Got It"
- Graham Walsh – mixing, production

== See also ==
- List of 2023 albums
