= N Nao =

Canadian singer-songwriter

N Nao is the stage name of Naomie de Lorimier, a Canadian dream pop singer-songwriter from Montreal, Quebec. She is most noted for her album L'eau et les rêves, which was longlisted for the 2023 Polaris Music Prize.

She released her debut album À jamais pour toujours in 2018. She released collaborated with Joni Void on the albums Nature morte (2020) and L’oiseau chante avec ses doigts (2021), and followed up with her second solo album L'eau et les rêves in 2023.

Her third album, Nouveau langage, was longlisted for the 2025 Polaris Music Prize.
