= Khotin (musician) =

Khotin is the stage name of Dylan Khotin-Foote (born December 13, 1993), a Canadian electronic musician from Edmonton, Alberta. He is most noted for his 2023 album Release Spirit, which was a longlisted nominee for the 2023 Polaris Music Prize.

He began his musical career using the name Happy Trendy, before releasing Hello World, his debut album as Khotin, in 2014.

He later became part owner of Normals Welcome, the electronic record label launched by Nik Kozub and Jason Troock.

== Discography ==
- Hello World (2014)
- New Tab (2017)
- Beautiful You (2018)
- Finds You Well (2020)
- Release Spirit (2023)
