= 2023 Polaris Music Prize =

Canadian music award

- Date: September 19, 2023
- Country: Canada
- Winner(s): Debby Friday, Good Luck
- Website: polarismusicprize.ca

The 2023 edition of the Canadian Polaris Music Prize was presented on September 19, 2023. The winner was electronic musician Debby Friday for her album Good Luck.

The longlist was announced on June 13, and the shortlist was released July 13.

== Shortlist ==
- Debby Friday, Good Luck
- Alvvays, Blue Rev
- Aysanabee, Watin
- Begonia, Powder Blue
- Daniel Caesar, Never Enough
- Feist, Multitudes
- Gayance, Mascarade
- Dan Mangan, Being Somewhere
- The Sadies, Colder Streams
- Snotty Nose Rez Kids, I'm Good, HBU?

== Longlist ==
- All Hands Make Light, Darling the Dawn
- Alvvays, Blue Rev
- Aquakultre, Don't Trip
- Aysanabee, Watin
- Badge Époque Ensemble, Clouds of Joy
- Begonia, Powder Blue
- Bibi Club, Le soleil et la mer
- Big Brave, nature morte
- Philippe Brach, Les gens qu'on aime
- Mariel Buckley, Everywhere I Used to Be
- Daniel Caesar, Never Enough
- Chiiild, Better Luck in the Next Life
- Feist, Multitudes
- Debby Friday, Good Luck
- Gayance, Mascarade
- Ghostkeeper, Multidimensional Culture
- Home Front, Games of Power
- JayWood, Slingshot
- Khotin, Release Spirit
- Thierry Larose, Sprint!
- Murray Lightburn, Once Upon a Time in Montreal
- Isabella Lovestory, Amor Hardcore
- Dan Mangan, Being Somewhere
- N Nao, L'eau et les rêves
- Tami Neilson, Kingmaker
- Eliza Niemi, Staying Mellow Blows
- Nico Paulo, Nico Paulo
- Planet Giza, Ready When You Are
- poolblood, mole
- Jessie Reyez, Yessie
- The Sadies, Colder Streams
- Jairus Sharif, Water & Tools
- Andy Shauf, Norm
- Dylan Sinclair, No Longer in the Suburbs
- Snotty Nose Rez Kids, I'm Good, HBU?
- Alexandra Stréliski, Néo-Romance
- U.S. Girls, Bless This Mess
- Witch Prophet, Gateway Experience
- Yoo Doo Right, A Murmur, Boundless to the East
- Zoon, Bekka Ma'iingan

== Polaris Heritage Prize ==
Nominees for the Slaight Family Polaris Heritage Prize, an award to honour classic Canadian albums released before the creation of the Polaris Prize, were announced at the main Polaris Prize ceremony. The winners were announced on October 19.

- Public Prize: Skinny Puppy, Bites
- Jury Prize: Maestro Fresh Wes, Symphony in Effect
- Beau Dommage, Beau Dommage
- The Guess Who, American Woman
- k-os, Exit
- k.d. lang, Absolute Torch and Twang
- Jean Leloup, Le Dôme
- Sarah McLachlan, Fumbling Towards Ecstasy
- Plastikman, Consumed
- Robbie Robertson, Robbie Robertson
- Spoons, Arias & Symphonies
- Various Artists, Rap Essentials Volume One
