= Luca Fogale =

Canadian pop singer

Luca Fogale is a Canadian pop singer-songwriter from Burnaby, British Columbia. He is most noted for his 2020 album Nothing Is Lost, which was a Juno Award nominee for Adult Contemporary Album of the Year at the Juno Awards of 2022.

After competing in the Peak Performance Project in 2013, Fogale released his debut album Safety in 2016, and followed up with the singles "I Don't Want to Lose You" in 2017 and "What I Came Here For" in 2018 before releasing Nothing Is Lost in 2020.

In 2023 he followed up with the album Run Where the Light Calls, for which he received another Juno Award nomination at the Juno Awards of 2024. He followed up in 2026 with the album Challenger.

He is a frequent collaborator with Mathew V, a fellow Juno nominee in 2022.

== Discography ==
- Safety - 2016
- Nothing Is Lost - 2020
- Run Where the Light Calls - 2023
- Challenger - 2026
