= Gayance =

Aïsha C. Vertus
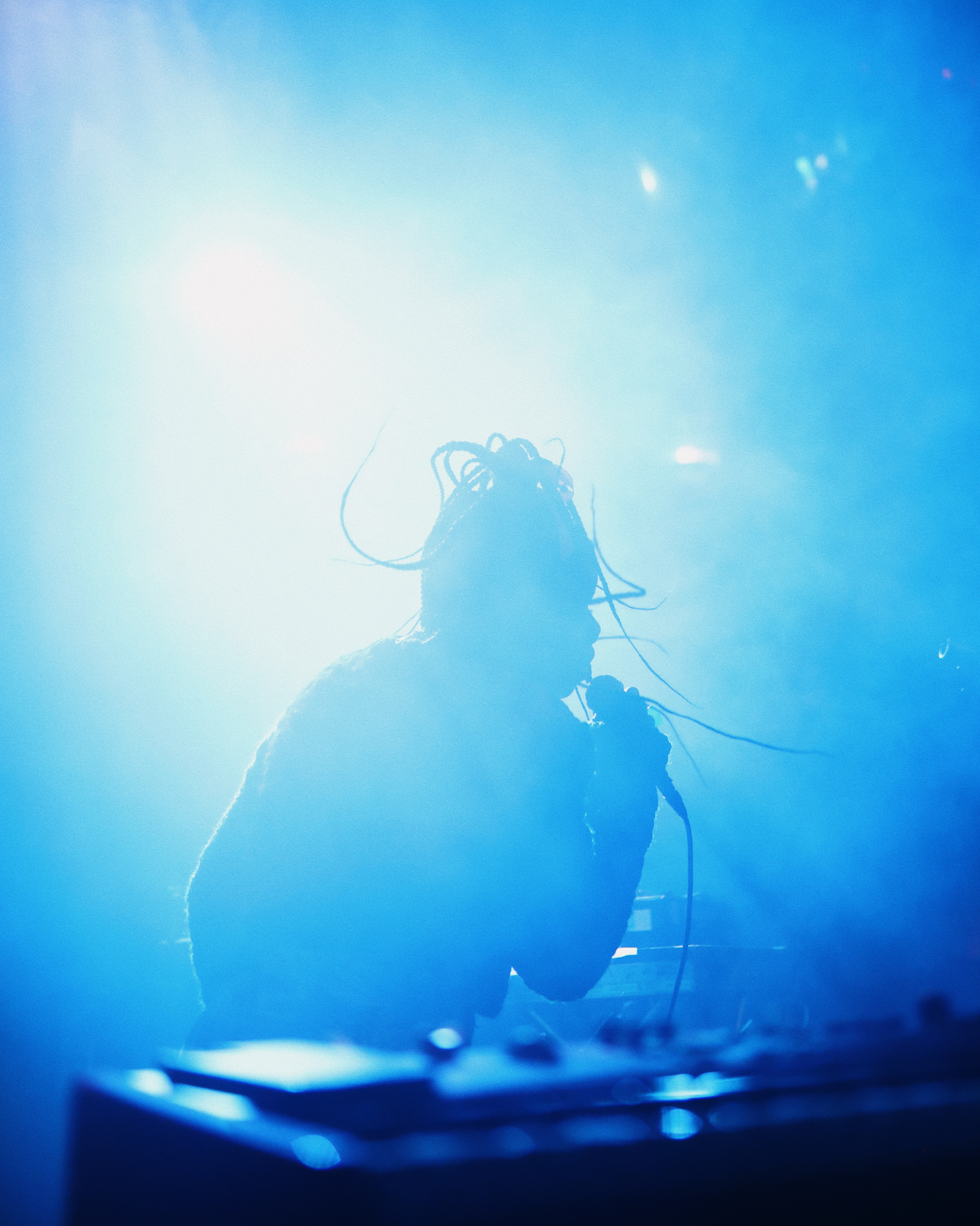
- Gayance performing at Jazz Cafe in London (March 2023)

Background information
- Born: January 1, 1992 (age 34); Montreal, Quebec, Canada
- Genres: Electronic, house
- Occupations: DJ, producer, singer, songwriter, arranger, composer
- Instruments: Keyboards, vocals, drum machine, turntables
- Labels: Rhythm Section International, K7 Music, Beautiful Music
- Website: bygayance.club

Aïsha Vertus, known professionally as Gayance (pronounced guy-ence), is a Canadian house and electronic music producer and DJ born and raised in Montreal, Quebec. Vertus grew up in Montreal-Nord, a multicultural neighborhood in Quebec. Her album Mascarade was shortlisted for the 2023 Polaris Music Prize.

== Early life ==
Gayance is of Haitian descent. She is a direct descendent of former Haitian president Jean-Nicolas Nissage Saget on her paternal grandmother's side. Vertus is fluent in French, English, Haitian Creole and Brazilian Portuguese.

Vertus attended a public art school in Montreal-Nord called École Primaire Ste-Gertrude where she learned piano and theater. She went to Danse Mode Action, a dance school and casting agency based in Montreal from 1996 until 2009. Here, she learned ballet, contemporary dance, and tap dance. She later went to Urban Element Zone to learn street dance and was part of a dance crew trained by Ricky St-Jusna and Andy Michel. She studied cinema and photography at Conservatoire Lassalle.

== Career ==
Vertus has been a club DJ in the Montreal area and has also directed a documentary called Piu Piu, which is a film about the Montreal beat scene, her local music scene, in 2012. The film Included Kaytranada, Dead Obies, Alaclair Ensemble and High Klassified.

Gayance was a music programmer for MURAL Festival in 2017 which headlined Post Malone and Pop Montreal from 2018 until 2021. Gayance was also the booker for Arcade Fire's Haitian restaurants Agrikol and Ti-Agrikol. Vertus was a host for VICE Québec, VICE Canada, and Noisey France from 2016 until 2018. She was the creative producer of the exhibition Vision Hip Hop QC in Montreal's PHI Center in 2022. She also worked as a content producer for several TV shows such as Pour Mes Fils Mon Silence est Impossible hosted by Isabelle Racicot, Tu Viens d'Où hosted by Nicolas Ouellet and she was the head of content for Table Rase for the first 2 seasons.

Vertus taught herself music production skills in Ableton Live during the COVID-19 pandemic with the help of Foxtrott and Belgian-Congolese producer Peter Clinton. She then released her debut EP No Toning Down in 2021. She signed to the dance music label Rhythm Section in 2022, releasing the single "Nunca Mais", co-produced by Dutch artist LAZA on the label that year. In March of 2023, she released her debut album Mascarade.

Alongside French-Canadian director Maïlis, Vertus is the creative director of the visual-album Mascarade: Origin Story for which Maïlis was shortlisted for a Young Director Award in Cannes, France.

== Personal life ==
After her first trip to Los Angeles in 2010 to seek the LA beat scene, she encountered Soulection. In 2014, she made her first solo trip to Brazil for a month at the same time as the World cup in Brazil for self-discovery. She fell in love with the Afro-Brazilian culture, especially from Bahia. In October 2017 after a severe burn-out, Vertus moved to Brussels, Belgium until September 2019. In Fall 2022, she relocated to Amsterdam, Netherlands.

== Works ==
=== Discography ===
- 2021: No Toning Down (EP)
- 2023: Mascarade (12' Rhythm Section International)
- 2026: roaming (Tru Thoughts)

=== Productions ===
- 2021: "Ritmo" co-produced by Dapapa
- 2022: "Sirens" feat. Kallitechnis, co-produced by Dapapa (Beautiful Music)

=== Songwriting and Topline ===
- 2023: "No More" produced by Jarreau Vandal (Hear This Records)
