= Planet Giza =

Canadian hip hop trio

Planet Giza is a Canadian hip hop trio from Montreal, Quebec. Consisting of rapper Tony Stone and producers Rami B and DoomX, the band create music influenced by funk and jazz.

Their debut album, Added Sugar, was released in 2019. They followed up in 2021 with the EP Don't Throw Rocks at the Moon, and in 2023 with the album Ready When You Are.

Ready When You Are was longlisted for the 2023 Polaris Music Prize.
