= Poolblood =

Canadian indie pop singer-songwriter

Poolblood (stylized in all lowercase) is the stage name of Maryam Said, a Canadian indie pop singer-songwriter from Toronto, Ontario.

Said, who is non-binary and uses they/them pronouns, released their debut EP Yummy in 2019. They followed up in 2022 with several preview singles, leading up to the release of their full-length debut album mole in January 2023.

mole was longlisted for the 2023 Polaris Music Prize.
