= Debby Friday =

Musician

Debby Friday is an electronic musician based in Toronto. Her debut album, Good Luck, released on Sub Pop in 2023, won the Polaris Music Prize.

== Early life ==
Friday was born in Nigeria, and raised in Montreal. In 2018, she moved from Montreal to Vancouver.

== Career ==
She released her first EP, Bitchpunk, in 2018. In August 2019, her second EP, Death Drive was named Bandcamp's "Album of the Day" and received a 7.2 from Pitchfork. In January 2023, she released the single "So Hard to Tell", ahead of debut album Good Luck, which was released on March 24, on Sub Pop.

Her second album, The Starrr of the Queen of Life, was released on 1 August 2025 through Royal Mountain Records and Sub Pop.

== Discography ==
=== Albums ===
- Good Luck (2023, Sub Pop)
- The Starrr of the Queen of Life (2025, Sub Pop)

=== Singles and EPs ===
- Bitchpunk EP (2018)
- Death Drive EP (2019)
- "So Hard to Tell" (2023)
- "Let U In" (2023)

== Awards ==
- 2020: Nominated, Prism Prize as co-director with Ryan Ermacora of the video for her song "Fatal"
- 2022: Nominated, Prism Prize as co-director with Ryan Ermacora of the video for her song "Focus"
- 2023: Winner, 2023 Polaris Music Prize, for Good Luck
- 2023: Nominated, Berlin Music Video Awards for Best Song for "So Hard to Tell"
