= Little Portugal, Montreal =

Little Portugal Petit Portugal
- Neighbourhood
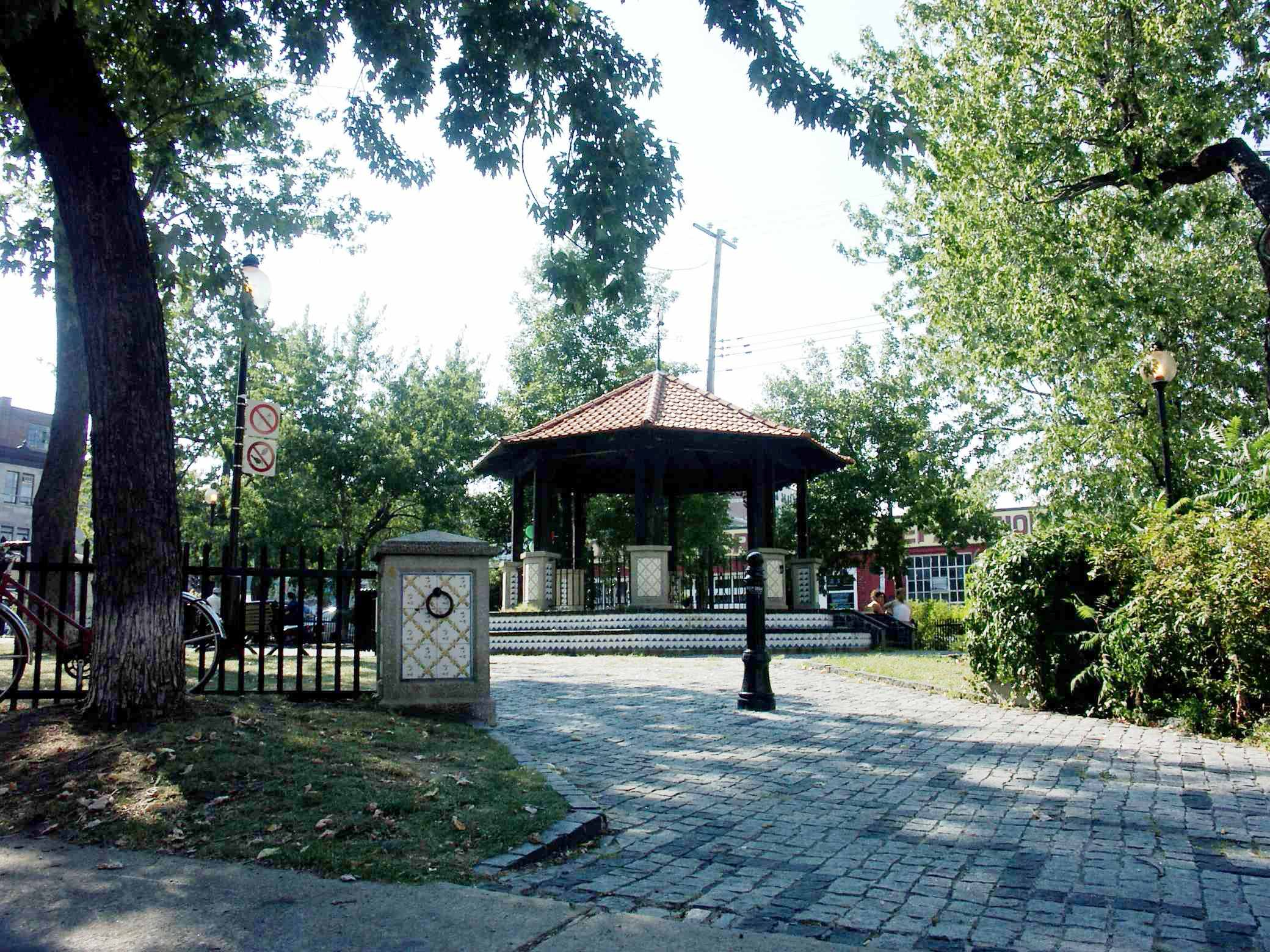
- Parc du Portugal

- Location of Little Portugal in Montreal
- Coordinates: 45.519056°N 73.584006°W
- Country: Canada
- Province: Quebec
- City: Montreal
- Borough: Le Plateau-Mont-Royal
- Established: 1956
- Postal Code: H2W, H2X
- Area codes: 514, 438

Little Portugal (French: Petit Portugal, pronounced [pəti pɔʁtyɡal]) is a neighbourhood in Montreal, Quebec, Canada. It is situated in the western portion of the borough of Le Plateau Mont-Royal.

Portuguese businesses can be found along several blocks of Saint Laurent Boulevard between Pine and Marie-Anne Street. The Portuguese area has largely absorbed what used to be the traditional Jewish neighbourhood. According to the 2006 Census, there were over 46,000 people of Portuguese descent in Montreal.

== Parc du Portugal ==
Parc du Portugal is located on Saint Laurent Boulevard between Marie-Anne Street and Vallières Street. The park with azulejos was founded in 1953, created by landscape architect Carlos R. Martinez to honour the city's Portuguese community. It was renovated in 2003 to mark the fiftieth anniversary of the Portuguese community in Montreal. It features a small drinking fountain by artist Rui Dias, which was renovated in his entirety by porcelain artist Sol Labos Brien. The original ceramic tiles were losing their design due to weather changes and were replaced by thick porcelain tiles. Prominent Canadian poet and musician Leonard Cohen lived in a home adjacent to the park, on St. Dominique Street, for much of his life.

== Gallery ==
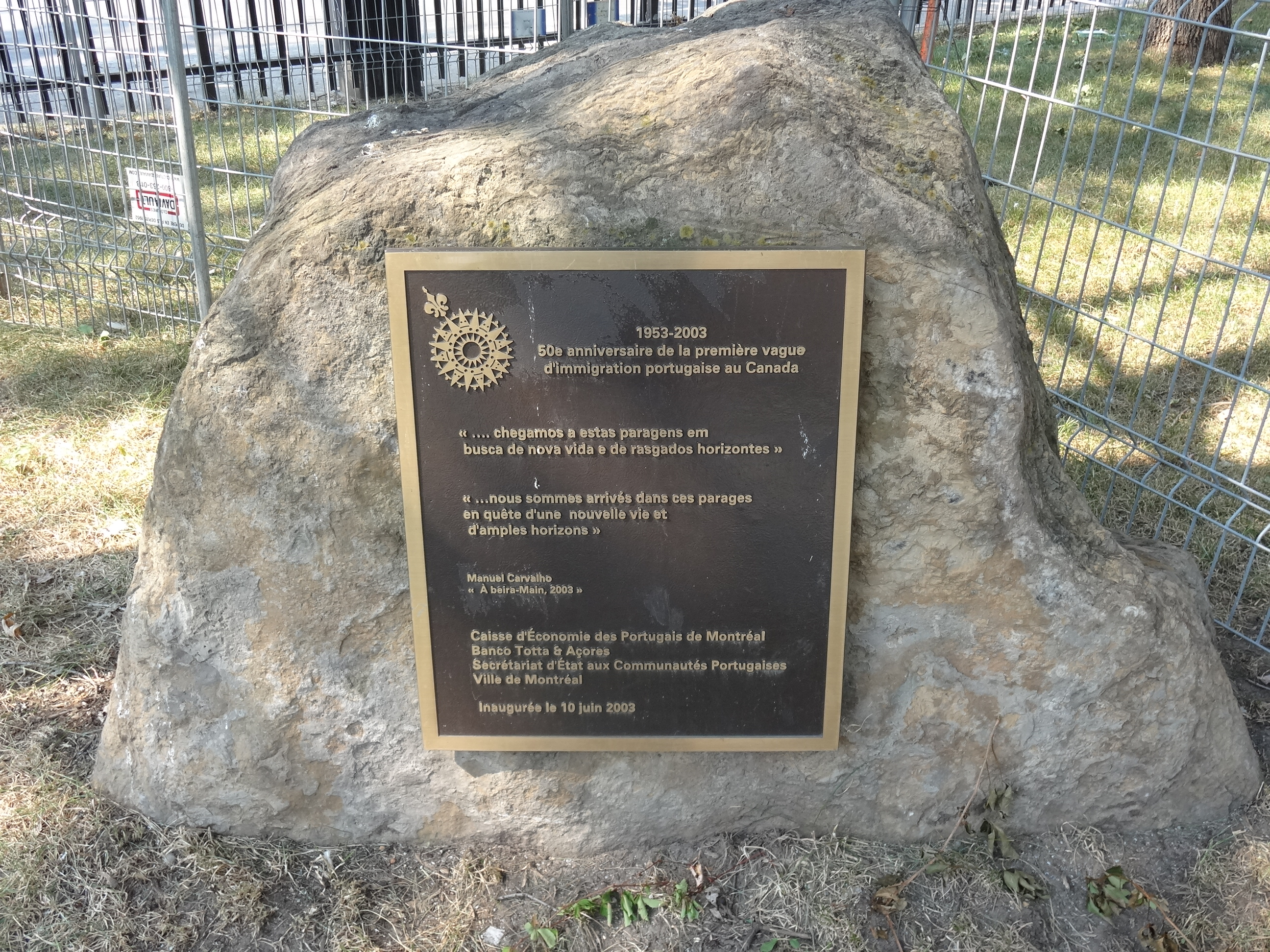

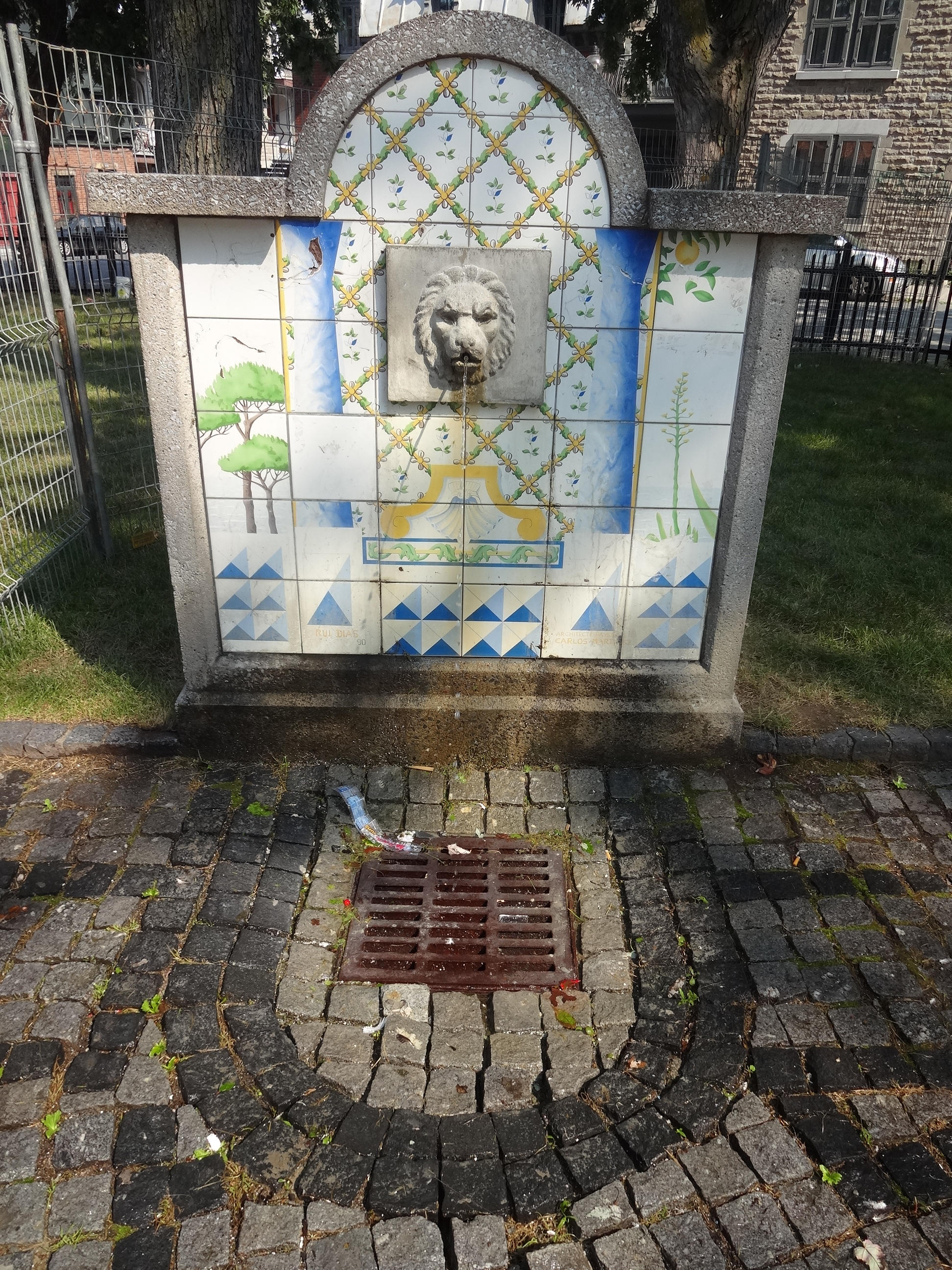
Before restoration

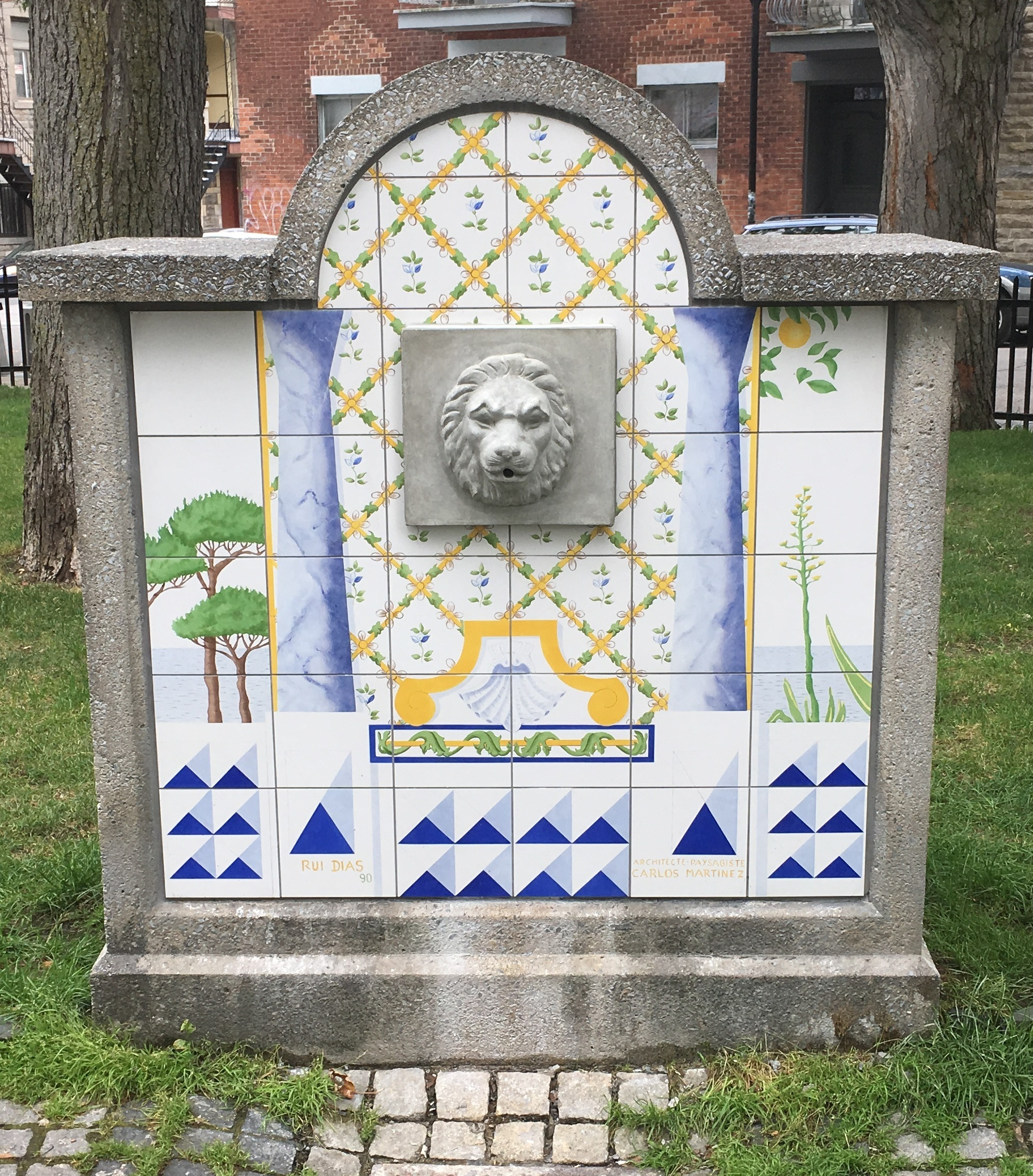
After restoration

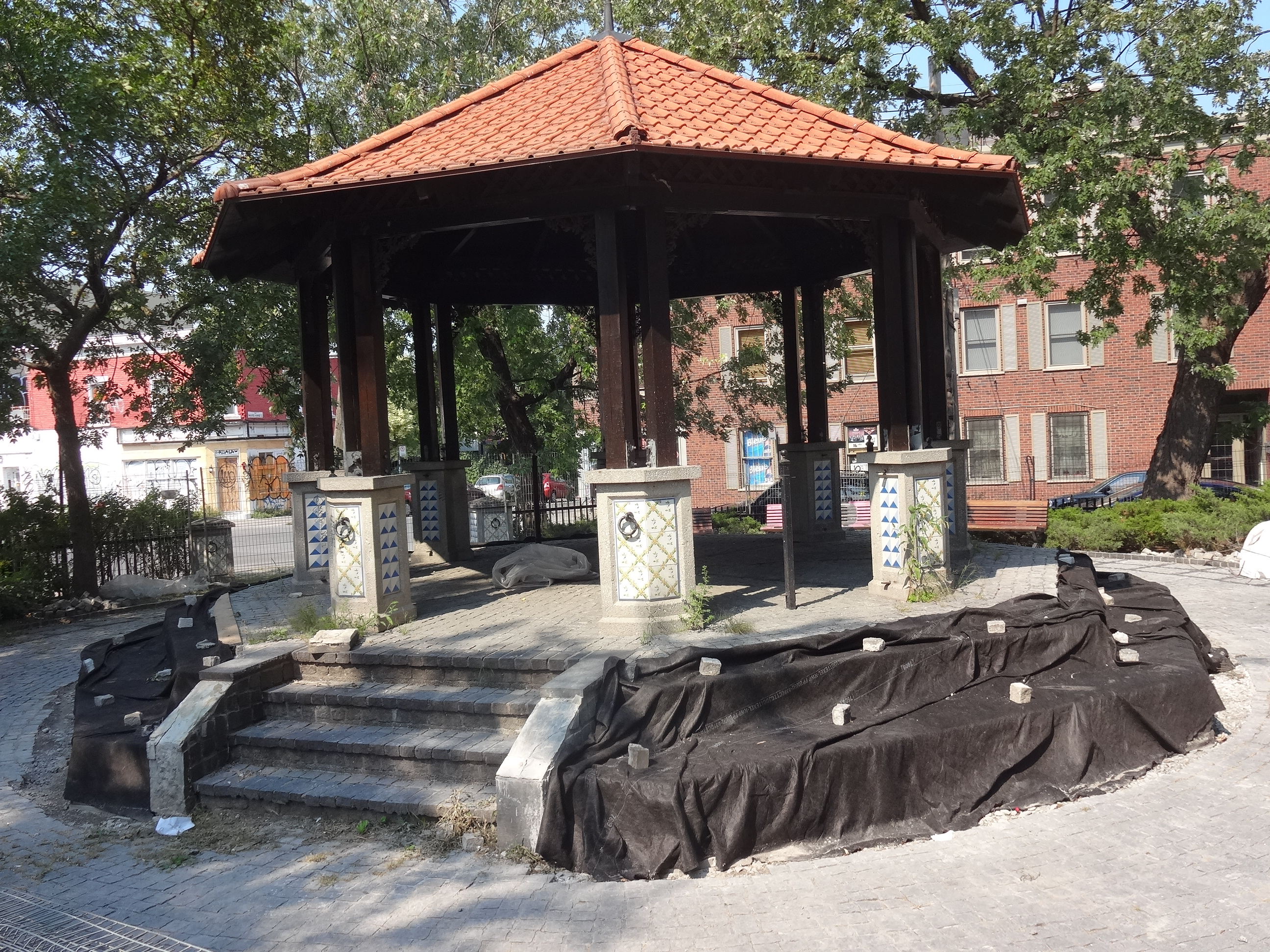

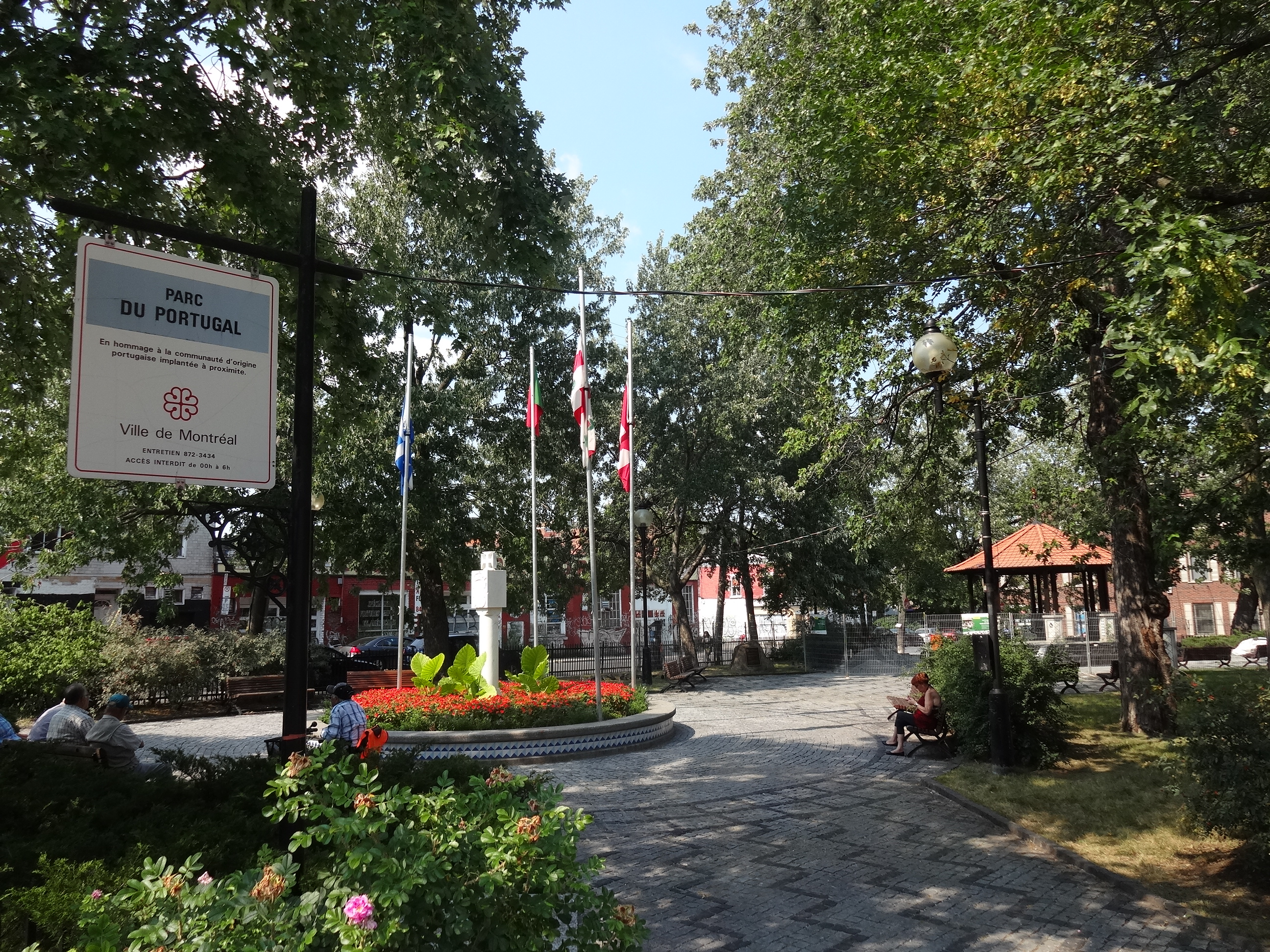

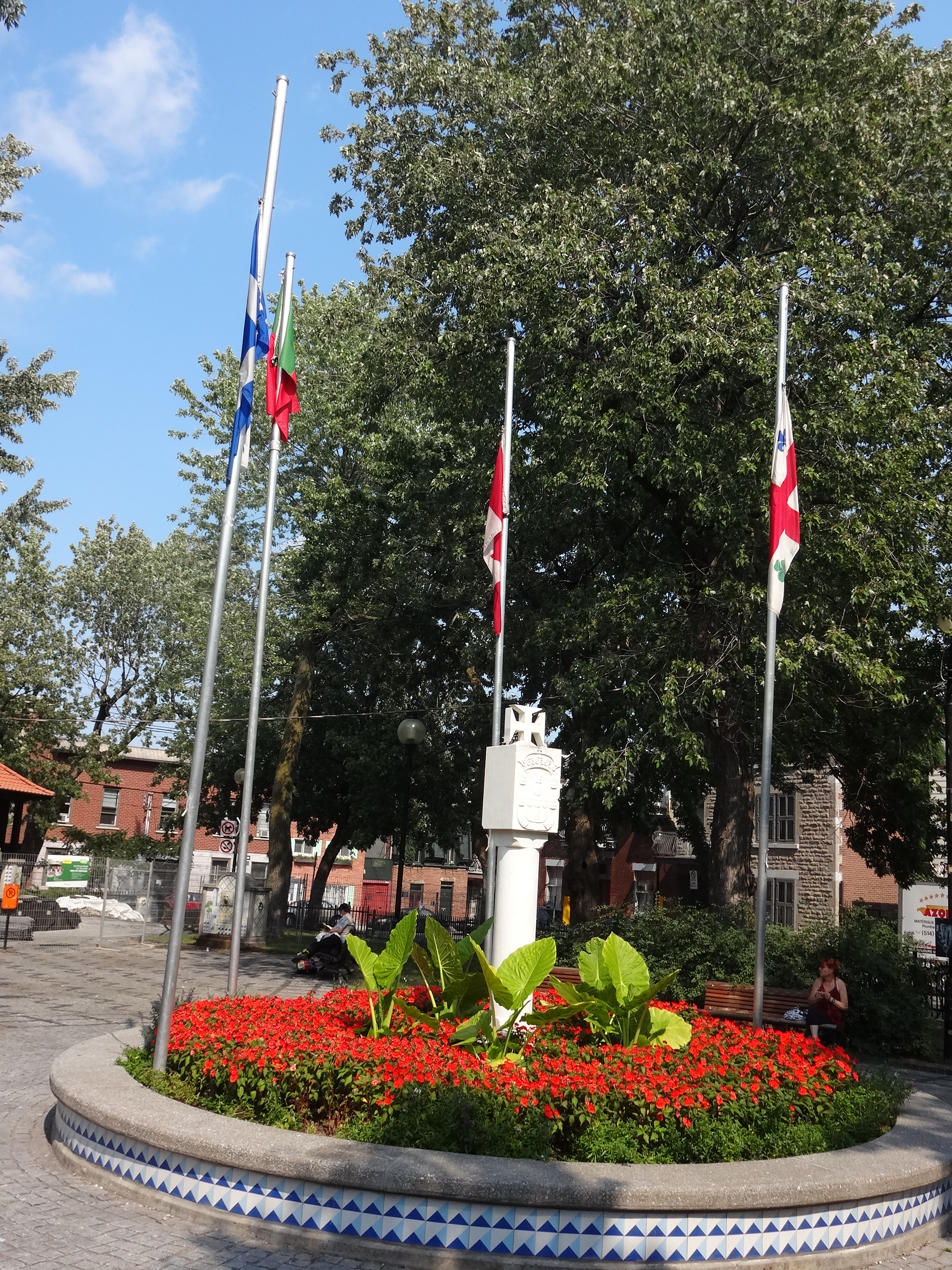
