= All Hands Make Light =

Canadian post-rock band

All Hands_Make Light
- Origin: Canada
- Genres: Experimental; noise-pop; post-rock; shoegaze
- Years active: 2020–
- Label: Constellation
- Spinoff of: Broken Social Scene; Godspeed You! Black Emperor
- Members: Ariel Engle; Efrim Menuck

All Hands_Make Light (stylized as ALL HANDS_MAKE LIGHT) is a Canadian experimental noise-pop duo, consisting of singer Ariel Engle and instrumentalist Efrim Menuck.

The project was launched in 2020 after Engle, associated with AroarA and Broken Social Scene, and Menuck, a member of Godspeed You! Black Emperor, decided to work on something together, and took shape through filesharing over the internet after the COVID-19 pandemic limited opportunities to collaborate in person. They released their self-titled debut album in 2021, and gave their first live performances including an appearance at the 2021 Pop Montreal festival.

They followed up in 2023 with Darling the Dawn, which was longlisted for the 2023 Polaris Music Prize.

== Discography ==
=== Studio albums ===
- Darling the Dawn (2023)

=== Extended plays ===
- ALL HANDS_MAKE LIGHT (2021)
