= Alysha Brilla =

Canadian musician

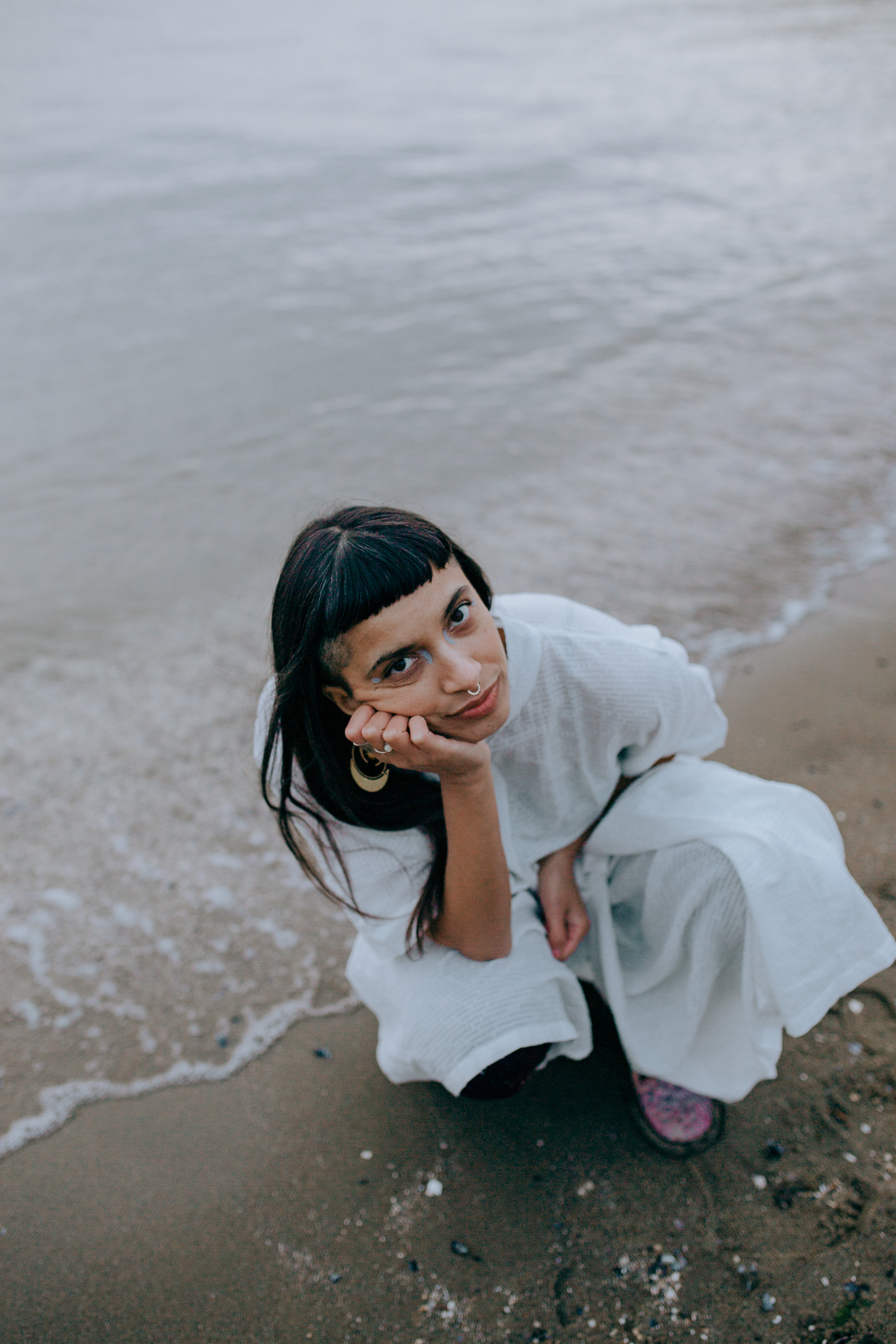
- Brilla in 2022

Background information
- Born: Alysha Brilla
- Genres: Folk; Pop; Soul
- Years active: 2010–present
- Label: Independent
- Website: alyshabrilla.com

Alysha Brilla is an Indo-Tanzanian Canadian singer, songwriter, and music producer.

She has received various awards and nominations including a three-time Juno nomination.

== Early life and background ==
Alysha Brilla was born from a Indo-Tanzanian father and Irish mother. She became interested in music while she was raising up in Brampton and Kitchener.

== Career ==
In 2013, Brilla produced her first full length album, In My Head which was nominated for a Juno Award for Adult Contemporary Album of the Year. Other albums Brilla has made include Womyn (2014), Rooted (2017) and The Painted Lady (2016), Circle (2021).

Brilla has collaborated with various artists and groups including The Black Eyed Peas, Tony Kanal, Danny Kortchmar, Bedouin Soundclash, Digging Roots, Bobby Alu and Sarah Thawer.

Brilla has also been a featured speaker at major industry events, including the Waterloo Region Small Business Centre (WRSBC), Folk Alliance International panels, and London City Music Awards among others.

In addition to her music career, Brilla is an associate professor at Berklee College of Music under the music production and engineering department.

== Discography ==
| Year | Album |
|---|---|
| 2013 | In My Head |
| 2014 | Womyn |
| 2016 | The Painted Lady |
| 2017 | Rooted |
| 2021 | Circle |
