= Erika de Vasconcelos =

Canadian novelist

Erika de Vasconcelos (born 1965) is a Portuguese Canadian novelist.

== Biography ==
Born in 1965 in Montreal to immigrants from Portugal, de Vasconcelos has one sister, Paula, now a theatrical director. A graduate of Marianopolis College, with a degree in English and Art History from McGill University, as well as a degree in Interior Design, she began writing in her 30s after her 10th class reunion at her former high school, Villa Maria. Her first novel, My Darling Dead Ones, was published in 1997 by Knopf Canada, and was subsequently translated into Portuguese, Dutch and German. Her second novel Between the Stillness and the Grove was published by Knopf Canada 2000 and also translated. She has also published stories/articles in several magazines, including Toronto Life, Quill and Quire, Chatelaine, House and Home, and The Globe and Mail. De Vasconcelos has also served on Juries for the Canada Council for the Arts, as well as the QSPELL Awards in Montreal.

De Vasconcelos has two daughters and one son, and is married to author Nino Ricci. She lives in Toronto.

== Books by this author ==
- Between the Stillness and the Grove (Knopf Canada, 2000)
- My Darling Dead Ones (Knopf Canada, 1997) - this title was published in the New Face of Fiction program.
