= FPTV =

Canadian Portuguese-language specialty channel

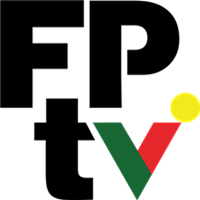
- FPTV logo
- Country: Canada
- Broadcast area: National (Ontario, Quebec, Newfoundland and Labrador, New Brunswick, Alberta and British Columbia)
- Headquarters: Toronto, Ontario, Canada

Programming
- Language: Portuguese
- Picture format: 1920x1080 (HD)

Ownership
- Owner: 1395047 Ontario Inc. (Fengate)

History
- Launched: September 7, 2001

Links
- Website: FPTV

FPTV (short for Festival Portuguese Television) is a Canadian Category B Portuguese language specialty channel. The channel's licensee is 1395047 Ontario Inc., a company founded by Frank Alvarez, in 2001.

FPTV broadcasts a variety of foreign and locally produced programs aimed at the Portuguese speaking communities in Canada from Portugal, Brazil, and Portugal's former African colonies. Programs include sports, news, telenovelas, and more. The majority of foreign programs are sourced from SIC Internacional, one of the most popular private networks in Portugal.

== History ==
In November 2000, Frank Alvarez was granted approval from the Canadian Radio-television and Telecommunications Commission (CRTC) to launch Festival Portuguese Television, described at the time as "a national ethnic Category 2 specialty television service targeting the Portuguese community, of which a significant source of foreign programming will be SIC International."

The channel launched on September 7, 2001 on Rogers Cable in parts of Ontario. It was scheduled to have three hours of local content.

FPTV logo 2001-2018)
