= Triumph discography =

- Studio albums: 10
- Live albums: 5
- Compilation albums: 4
- Singles: 17
- Video albums: 10

Triumph is a Canadian hard rock band that was popular in the late 1970s through the 1980s. Between the band's 16 albums and DVDs, Triumph has received 18 gold and 9 platinum awards in Canada and the United States. Triumph was nominated for multiple Juno Awards, including Group of the Year Award in 1979, 1985, 1986 and 1987.

The band was formed in 1975 by Gil Moore (Drums & Vocals), Rik Emmett (Guitar, Vocals), Mike Levine (Bass Guitar & Keyboards), the band had since experienced lineup changes. Rik Emmett left to pursue a solo career and was replaced by Phil X. The original members, Rik, Gil and Mike have performed at the Sweden Rock Festival and Rocklahoma.

== Studio albums ==
Title	Album details	Peak chart positions				Certifications	
Title	Album details	CAN	SWE	UK	US	CAN	US
Triumph	Released: October 13, 1976; Label: Attic Records	—	—	—	—	Gold	—N/a
Rock & Roll Machine	Released: November 3, 1977; Label: Attic Records	19	—	—	182	2× Platinum	—N/a
Just a Game	Released: March 1979; Label: RCA Records	—	—	—	48	Platinum	Gold
Progressions of Power	Released: March 1980; Label: RCA Records	—	—	61	32	Gold	—N/a
Allied Forces	Released: September 1981; Label: RCA Records	—	44	64	23	Gold	Platinum
Never Surrender	Released: December 1982; Label: RCA Records	29	31	—	26	Gold	Gold
Thunder Seven	Released: November 1984; Label: MCA Records	43	43	—	35	Platinum	Gold
The Sport of Kings	Released: August 1986; Label: MCA Records	33	—	—	33	Gold	—N/a
Surveillance	Released: November 1987; Label: MCA Records	31	—	—	82	Gold	—N/a
Edge of Excess	Released: October 27, 1992; Label: Victory Music	—	—	—	—	—N/a	—N/a
"—" denotes a recording that did not chart or was not released in that territory.

== Live albums ==
Title	Album details	Peak chart positions				Certifications	
Title	Album details	CAN	SWE	UK	US	CAN	US
Stages	Released: October 14, 1985; Label: MCA	33	13	—	50	Gold	—N/a
King Biscuit Flower Hour (In Concert)	Released: February 27, 1996; Label: TML.	—	—	—	—	—N/a	—N/a
Live at the US Festival	Released: September 23, 2003; Label: TML	—	—	—	—	—N/a	—N/a
Live at Sweden Rock Festival	Released: August 28, 2012; Label: Frontiers (Europe) TML (Canada, US)	—	—	—	—	—N/a	—N/a
"—" denotes a recording that did not chart or was not released in that territory.

== Compilation albums ==
Title	Album details	Peak chart positions				Certifications	
Title	Album details	CAN	SWE	UK	US	CAN	US
Classics	Released: March 3, 1989; Label: MCA Records	—	—	—	—	Platinum	Gold
Livin' for the Weekend: Anthology	Released: April 27, 2005; Label: Castle Music	—	—	—	—	—N/a	—N/a
Extended Versions: Triumph	Released: October 31, 2006; Label: TML	—	—	—	—	—N/a	—N/a
Greatest Hits Remixed	Released: May 18, 2010; Label: TML	—	—	—	—	—N/a	—N/a
Triumph Rock and Roll Machine(Music From The Documentary)	Released: 2022; Label: TML	—	—	—	—	—N/a	—N/a
The Best of Triumph	Released: June 12, 2026; Label: Craft Recordings	—	—	—	—	—	—
"—" denotes a recording that did not chart or was not released in that territory.

== Videos ==
Title	Video details	Certifications
Live at the US Festival	Released: 2003; Label: TML; Format: VHS, DVD	—N/a
A Night of Triumph	Released: 2004; Label: TML; Format: VHS, DVD, Laserdisc	—N/a
Live at Sweden Rock Festival	Released: 2012; Label: Frontiers (Europe) TML (Canada, US); Format: DVD	—N/a

== Singles ==
Title	Year	Canada (RPM)	UK	U.S. Hot 100	Rock	Album
"Hobo"	1975	—	—	—	x	—N/a
"24 Hours A Day"	1976	—	—	—	x	Triumph
"What's Another Day Of Rock 'N Roll"	1977	—	—	—	x	Triumph
"Rocky Mountain Way"	1978	64	—	—	x	Rock & Roll Machine
"Hold On"	1979	33	—	38	x	Just A Game
"Lay It on the Line"	1979	72	—	86	x	Just A Game
"I Can Survive"	1980	85	—	91	x	Progressions of Power
"I Live For The Weekend"	1980	—	59	—	x	Progressions of Power
"Fight the Good Fight"	1981	—	—	—	18	Allied Forces
"Magic Power"	1981	14	—	51	8	Allied Forces
"Say Goodbye"	1982	36	—	102	50	Allied Forces
"All The Way"	1983	—	—	—	2	Never Surrender
"Never Surrender"	1983	—	—	—	23	Never Surrender
"A World of Fantasy"	1983	—	—	—	3	Never Surrender
"Spellbound"	1984	—	—	—	10	Thunder Seven
"Follow Your Heart"	1985	—	—	88	13	Thunder Seven
"Somebody's Out There"	1986	84	—	27	9	The Sport of Kings
"Tears In The Rain"	1986	—	—	—	23	The Sport of Kings
"Just One Night"	1987	33	—	—	—	The Sport of Kings
"Let The Light (Shine On Me)"	1987	61	—	—	—	Surveillance
"Long Time Gone"	1987	—	—	—	28	Surveillance
"Never Say Never"	1987	—	—	—	—	Surveillance
"Child Of The City"	1993	91	—	—	30	Edge of Excess
"—" denotes a recording that did not chart or was not released in that territory. "x" indicates the chart did not exist at the time.
