= Classics (Triumph album) =

Greatest hits album by Triumph
- Released: August 1989
- Recorded: 1977–1986
- Genre: Hard rock
- Length: 55:21
- Label: MCA

Triumph chronology
Surveillance (album) (1987)	Classics (1989)	Edge of Excess (1992)

Professional ratings
Review scores
Source	Rating
Allmusic link	4.5/5 stars

Classics is a compilation album by Canadian rock band Triumph, released in 1989 (see 1989 in music).

== Track listing ==
Side one
No.	Title	Writer(s)	Original album	Length
1.	"Tears in the Rain"	Rik Emmett, Mike Levine, Gil Moore	The Sport of Kings (1986)	3:53
2.	"Hold On"	Emmett	Just a Game (1979)	6:05
3.	"I Live for the Weekend"	Emmett, Levine, Moore	Progressions of Power (1980)	5:18
4.	"Magic Power"	Emmett, Levine, Moore	Allied Forces (1981)	4:54
5.	"Follow Your Heart"	Emmett, Levine, Moore	Thunder Seven (1984)	3:27

CD bonus track
No.	Title	Writer(s)	Original album	Length
6.	"A World of Fantasy"	Emmett, Levine, Moore, Tam Patrick	Never Surrender (1983)	5:03

Side two
No.	Title	Writer(s)	Original album	Length
7.	"Fight the Good Fight"	Emmett, Levine, Moore	Allied Forces (1981)	6:20
8.	"Spellbound"	Emmett, Levine, Moore	Thunder Seven (1984)	5:12
9.	"Somebody's Out There"	Emmett, Levine, Moore	The Sport of Kings (1986)	4:05
10.	"Lay It on the Line"	Emmett	Just a Game (1979)	4:04
11.	"Rock 'n' Roll Machine"	Moore	Rock & Roll Machine (1977)	6:55

== Personnel ==
- Rik Emmett – guitars & vocals
- Gil Moore – drums & vocals
- Michael Levine – bass & keyboards

=== Production credits ===
- Mike Clink – tracks 1, 9
- Mike Levine and Triumph – tracks 2, 10
- Triumph – tracks 3, 4, 7
- Triumph and Eddie Kramer – tracks 5, 8
- Triumph and David Thoener – track 6
- Mike Levine and Doug Hill – track 11

== Certifications ==
Region	Certification	Certified units/sales
Canada (Music Canada)	Platinum	100,000^{^}
United States (RIAA)	Gold	500,000^{^}
^{^} Shipments figures based on certification alone.
