= Livin' for the Weekend (Triumph album) =

Livin' for the Weekend: The Anthology

Compilation album by Triumph
- Released: May 10, 2005
- Recorded: 2004–05
- Genre: Rock
- Length: 147:50
- Label: Castle
- Producer: Emmett, Levine, Moore

Triumph chronology
A Night of Triumph (2004)	Livin' for the Weekend: The Anthology (2005)	Extended Versions: Triumph (2006)

Professional ratings
Review scores
Source	Rating
AllMusic	4.5/5 stars

Livin' for the Weekend: The Anthology is a compilation album by the Canadian hard rock band Triumph. The most comprehensive Triumph anthology ever issued at the time of its 2005 release, this two-CD set draws material from most of the albums the band had issued, as well as adding a previously unreleased cover of "Love Hurts" and two live tracks: "Spellbound" from their 1985 release Stages and "Never Surrender" from their 1983 appearance at the US Festival that was released in 2003 on Live at the US Festival.

== Tracks ==
=== Disc one ===
1. "24 Hours a Day" – 4:25
2. "Street Fighter" – 6:30
3. "Blinding Light Show"/"Moonchild" – 8:41
4. "Takes Time" – 3:47
5. "Medley: New York City Streets, Pt. 1/ Pt. 2" – 7:51
6. "Rocky Mountain Way" (Barnstorm cover) – 4:06
7. "Lay It on the Line" – 4:04
8. "Hold On" – 6:03
9. "I Live for the Weekend" – 5:17
10. "I Can Survive" – 3:59
11. "Fool for Your Love" – 4:29
12. "Allied Forces" – 5:05
13. "Fight the Good Fight" – 6:30

=== Disc two ===
1. "Magic Power" – 4:54
2. "Too Much Thinking" – 5:38
3. "When the Lights Go Down" – 5:05
4. "Follow Your Heart" – 3:34
5. "Spellbound [live]" – 3:57
6. "Mind Games" – 4:47
7. "Tears in the Rain" – 3:54
8. "Somebody's Out There" – 4:05
9. "Just One Night" – 3:40
10. "Never Say Never" – 3:37
11. "Headed for Nowhere" – 6:07
12. "Carry on the Flame" – 5:15
13. "Long Time Gone" – 5:14
14. "Never Surrender [live]" – 6:38
15. "Love Hurts" (The Everly Brothers cover) – 4:38

== Personnel ==
- Rik Emmett – guitar, vocals
- Gil Moore – drums, percussion, vocals
- Michael Levine – bass guitar, keyboards, synthesizers
