= Metalworks Studios =

Recording studio in Mississauga, Canada

- Logo
- Type: Recording studio
- Founded: 1978; 48 years ago
- Founder: Gil Moore
- Headquarters: Mississauga, Ontario, Canada
- Website: metalworksstudios.com

Metalworks Studios is a music recording studio in the Greater Toronto Area Mississauga, Ontario, Canada. It was established in 1977 by Gil Moore of the Canadian rock group, Triumph, initially as a sound company and studio called Design Staging. The following year the name was changed to Metalworks. Currently, Metalworks Studios is a six studio facility offering in-house tracking, mixing and mastering, as well as video editing and DVD authoring.

In 2004, Metalworks Studios launched an adjacent educational facility; Metalworks Institute, and in 2005, Metalworks Production Group was created, with a focus on live event staging.

Metalworks Studios has won 17 'Studio of the Year' awards at Canadian Music Week from 1998 to 2015.

== Studios ==
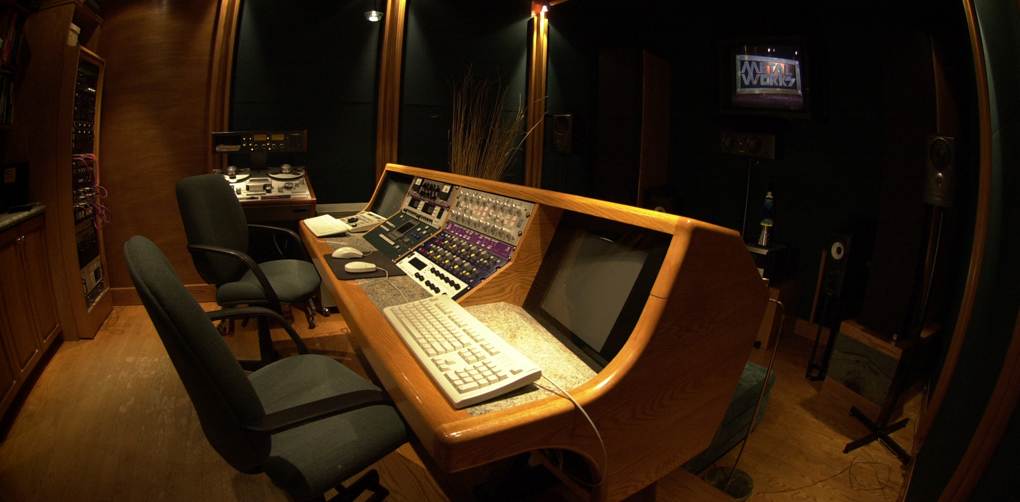
Metalworks Studio 5 Mastering Suite Control Room

Metalworks Studios operates as a multi-studio complex with six specialised studio spaces designed for commercial audio tracking, mixing, mastering, and video post-production.

The facility's primary mixing and tracking rooms utilise large-format solid-state consoles, paired with isolated live tracking environments. Over its four decades of operation, Metalworks physical infrastructire has evolved from a private recording studio for Moore and Triumph into a commercial recording facility that supports not only commercial client sessions, but also acts as an instructional space for the adjacent Metalworks Institute.

== Clients ==
=== Musicians ===
- Christina Aguilera
- Mohsen Chavoshi
- SOCAN
- Doug and the Slugs
- Alexisonfire
- Kobra and the Lotus
- The Bachman-Cummings Band
- Barenaked Ladies
- Brymo
- Drake
- John River
- Judy & David
- David Bowie
- Dolores O'Riordan
- The Cranberries
- Tom Cochrane
- Burton Cummings
- D12
- DMX
- Fair to Midland
- Fates Warning
- Nelly Furtado
- Guns N' Roses
- K-OS
- Katy Perry
- Lights
- Limp Bizkit
- Demi Lovato
- Kim Mitchell
- Moneen
- Anne Murray
- Negramaro
- The Next Star
- 'N Sync
- Our Lady Peace
- Placebo
- Platinum Blonde
- Prince
- Protest The Hero
- Rush
- Sandbox
- Serial Joe
- Silverstein
- Sisqó
- Ashlee Simpson
- Starchild
- Sum 41
- Swami
- The Tea Party
- Tina Turner
- Triumph
- Toto
- David Usher
- Kate Voegele
- Voivod
- Chance the Rapper

=== Actors ===
- Catherine Zeta-Jones
- Renée Zellweger
- Steven Seagal
- Richard Gere
- Denise Richards

== Awards ==
- 2014 Canadian Music Week Recording Studio of The Year
- 2013 SME Excellence Award – Ontario Business Achievement Awards (OBAA)
- 2013 Canadian Music Week Recording Studio of the Year
- 2012 Canadian Music Week Recording Studio of the Year
- 2011 Canadian Music Week Recording Studio of the Year
- 2009 Canadian Music Week Recording Studio of the Year
- 2008 Canadian Music Week Recording Studio of the Year
- 2007 Canadian Music Week Recording Studio of the Year
- 2006 Canadian Music Week Recording Studio of the Year
- 2005 Canadian Music Week Recording Studio of the Year
- 2004 Canadian Music Week Recording Studio of the Year
- 2003 Canadian Music Week Recording Studio of the Year
- 2002 Mississauga Board of Trade, Business and the Arts Award in recognition of 'Outstanding Contribution to the Arts Community of Mississauga'
- 2002 Canadian Music Week Recording Studio of the Year
- 2001 Canadian Music Week Recording Studio of the Year
- 2000 Canadian Music Week Recording Studio of the Year
- 1999 Canadian Music Week Recording Studio of the Year
- 1998 Canadian Music Week Recording Studio of the Year

=== Gold and platinum awards ===
Award	Certification	Artist	Album Title	Label
Platinum	CRIA	Alexisonfire	Crisis	Distort
Gold	CRIA	Alexisonfire	Old Crows/Young Cardinals	Dine Alone
Platinum	CRIA	Anne Murray	What A Wonderful World	Straightway Records
Platinum	RIAA	Anne Murray	What A Wonderful World	Straightway Records
Double Platinum	CRIA	Ashley MacIsaac	Hi™ How Are You Today?	A&M
Gold	CRIA	Bruce Springsteen	We Shall Overcome	Columbia
Gold	RIAA	Bruce Springsteen	We Shall Overcome	Columbia
Platinum	CRIA	Burton Cummings	Up Close And Alone	Universal
Platinum	CRIA	Chicago (film)	Soundtrack	Epic
2× Platinum	RIAA	Chicago (film)	Soundtrack	Epic
Gold	CRIA	Doug and the Slugs	Cognac & Bologna	RCA
2× Platinum	CRIA	Drake	Take Care	Universal Republic
2× Platinum	RIAA	Drake	Take Care	Universal Republic
2× Platinum	CRIA	Drake	Take Care (single)	Universal Republic
2× Platinum	RIAA	Drake	Take Care (single)	Universal Republic
2× Platinum	ARIA	Drake	Take Care (single)	Universal Republic
Platinum	CRIA	Fefe Dobson	Fefe Dobson	Island
Gold	CRIA	Gowan	Lost Brotherhood	Atlantic
9× Platinum	CRIA	Guns N' Roses	Use Your Illusion II	Geffen
7× Platinum	RIAA	Guns N' Roses	Use Your Illusion II	Geffen
Platinum	BPI	Guns N' Roses	Use Your Illusion II	Geffen
Platinum	CRIA	Haywire	Don't Just Stand There	Attic
Platinum	CRIA	Headstones	Picture of Health	MCA
Gold	CRIA	Headstones	Teeth and Tissue	MCA
Gold	CRIA	Headstones	Smile and Wave	MCA
2× Platinum	CRIA	Johnny Reid	Kicking Stones	Open Road
2× Platinum	CRIA	Kim Mitchell	Rockland	Atlantic
Platinum	CRIA	Kim Mitchell	Greatest Hits	Alert
Platinum	CRIA	k-os	Joyful Rebellion	EMI
5× Platinum	CRIA	Live 8 Toronto	Music DVD	EMI
2× Diamond	CRIA	Live 8	Music DVD	EMI
9× Platinum	RIAA	Live 8	Music DVD	EMI
Platinum	CRIA	Metric	Live It Out	Last Gang
Platinum	CRIA	Metric	Fantasies	Universal
2× Platinum	CRIA	'N Sync	Celebrity	Jive
5× Platinum	RIAA	'N Sync	Celebrity	Jive
Gold	BPI	'N Sync	Celebrity	Jive
Platinum	CRIA	Nelly Furtado	Folklore	DreamWorks
Gold	RIAA	Nelly Furtado	Folklore	DreamWorks
4× Platinum	CRIA	Nelly Furtado	Whoa, Nelly!	DreamWorks
2× Platinum	RIAA	Nelly Furtado	Whoa, Nelly!	DreamWorks
Platinum	CRIA	Our Lady Peace	Healthy In Paranoid Times	Columbia
4× Platinum	CRIA	Platinum Blonde	Alien Shores	Columbia
Platinum	CRIA	Prairie Oyster	Everybody Knows	RCA
Gold	CRIA	Prince	Musicology	Columbia
2× Platinum	RIAA	Prince	Musicology	Columbia
Platinum	CRIA	Red Rider	Neruda	Capitol
Diamond	CRIA	Rush	Rush in Rio	Anthem/Atlantic
7× Platinum	RIAA	Rush	Rush in Rio	Anthem/Atlantic
Gold	CRIA	Rush	Vapor Trails	Anthem/Atlantic
3× Platinum	ARIA	Silverchair	Young Modern	Eleven/Atlantic
3× Platinum	CRIA	Sum 41	All Killer No Filler	Aquarius
Platinum	RIAA	Sum 41	All Killer No Filler	Aquarius
Platinum	BPI	Sum 41	All Killer No Filler	Aquarius
Gold	CRIA	The Northern Pikes	Big Blue Sky	Virgin
Platinum Video	CRIA	The Tea Party	Illuminations	EMI
Gold	CRIA	The Tea Party	Seven Circles	EMI
Platinum	CRIA	The Tea Party	Triptych	EMI
Diamond	CRIA	Tom Cochrane	Mad Mad World	Capitol
Gold	RIAA	Tom Cochrane	Mad Mad World	Capitol
Platinum	CRIA	Tom Cochrane & Red Rider	The Symphony Sessions	Capitol
Gold	CRIA	Triumph	Allied Forces	RCA, TML, Attic
Platinum	RIAA	Triumph	Allied Forces	RCA, TML, Attic
Platinum	CRIA	Triumph	Classics	MCA
Gold	RIAA	Triumph	Classics	MCA
Gold	CRIA	Triumph	Progressions of Power	Attic, RCA, TML
Gold	CRIA	Triumph	Never Surrender	RCA, TML
Gold	RIAA	Triumph	Never Surrender	RCA, TML
Platinum	CRIA	Triumph	Thunder Seven	MCA
Gold	RIAA	Triumph	Thunder Seven	MCA
Platinum	CRIA	Triumph	The Sport of Kings	MCA
Gold	CRIA	Triumph	Surveillance	MCA
Gold	RIAA	Triumph	Just A Game	MCA

CRIA Awards	Units Sold
139	7,180,000

RIAA Awards	Units Sold
47	27,100,000
