= King Biscuit Flower Hour (In Concert) =

Live album by Triumph
- Released: February 27, 1996
- Recorded: October 12, 1981
- Venue: Public Hall Auditorium, Cleveland Ohio
- Genre: Rock
- Length: 71:26
- Label: King Biscuit Flower
- Producer: Emmett, Levine, Moore

Triumph chronology
Stages	King Biscuit Flower Hour (In Concert)	Live at the US Festival

Professional ratings
Review scores
Source	Rating
AllMusic	3/5 stars

King Biscuit Flower Hour (In Concert) is a live album by Canadian rock band Triumph released in 1996. Taken from the Allied Forces tour stop in Cleveland on October 12, 1981, this album features songs from the album of the same name in addition to some of the earlier hits.

== Track listing ==
1. "Tear the Roof Off" – 5:03
2. "American Girls" – 4:54
3. "Lay it on the Line" – 4:54
4. "Allied Forces" – 3:46
5. "Fight the Good Fight" – 5:23
6. "Blinding Light Show" / "Moon Child" – 12:28
7. "Rock and Roll Machine" – 9:39
8. "I Live for the Weekend" – 2:22
9. "Nature's Child" – 4:14
10. "Drum Solo" – 3:43
11. "Instrumental" – 5:09
12. "Rocky Mountain Way" – 5:10
13. "Hot Time (In this City Tonight)" – 4:44

== Notes ==
For "Hot Time (In this City Tonight)" the band did their usual procedure and put in the name of the city where they were playing, thus calling on this particular live version "Hot Time (In Old Cleveland Tonight)". Also at the end Rik Emmett says the final "good night" and "Triumph loves you" instead of Mike Levine who usually says it at the end of each show.

== Personnel ==
- Rik Emmett – guitars, vocals
- Gil Moore – drums, vocals
- Mike Levine – bass
