= Just a Game =

Just a Game may refer to:

== Music ==
- Just a Game (album), a 1979 album by Triumph
- "Just a Game", a song by Birdy from the 2012 soundtrack The Hunger Games: Songs from District 12 and Beyond
- "Just a Game", a song by the Monkees from their 1969 album, Instant Replay

== Other uses ==
- Just a Game (film), a 1983 Canadian drama
- Just a Game (horse), a Thoroughbred racehorse
  - Just a Game Stakes, an American horse race
