= Metalworks Institute =

Canadian post-secondary institution

Coordinates: 43.57861°N 79.64935°W

- Logo
- Type: Post-Secondary Institution
- Established: 2005
- Location: Mississauga, Ontario, Canada
- Campus: Urban
- Website: Metalworks Institute

Metalworks Institute is a post-secondary institution based in Mississauga, Ontario. Metalworks Institute offers certificates, diplomas, and advanced diplomas, on-campus and online, educating students for direct entry into careers in the entertainment industry or for articulation into undergraduate degrees. The institute was founded by Gil Moore (Inductee of the Mississauga Music Walk of Fame) of the Canadian rock band Triumph (inductees into the Canadian Music Hall of Fame), and is the educational extension of Metalworks Studios, Canada's largest music recording studio, and Metalworks Production Group. Metalworks Institute delivers programs in four core streams: Live Music, Recorded Music, Entertainment Business and Music Performance, at the flagship Mississauga campus and at the Fredericton campus.

Metalworks Institute received the inaugural Canadian Music & Broadcast Industry award for Music School of the Year in 2016 and again in 2019.

== History and accreditation ==
Metalworks Institute Mississauga was founded in 2005 and is registered as a Private Career College under the Private Career Colleges Act, 2005. Metalworks Institute Fredericton was founded in 2020 and is a Private Occupational Training Organization registered under the Private Occupational Training Act, 1996. Metalworks Institute offers diploma and advanced diploma programs, on-campus and online, as well as individual certificate courses. The Institute includes over 80 full-time staff members and has an enrollment of more than 250 students.

On November 20, 2013, the Metalworks Group was the recipient of the SME Excellence Award at the Ontario Business Achievement Awards (OBAA), presented by the Ontario Chamber of Commerce. In 2016, Metalworks Institute received the inaugural Canadian Music & Broadcast Industry award for Music School of the Year. They then received the Canadian Music & Broadcast Industry award for Music School of the Year a second time in 2019 In 2019, Metalworks Institute received the inaugural Paul Kitchin Award for Community Involvement from Career Colleges Ontario for their sponsorship of the Sound Engineering Program at Interprovincial Music Camp (IMC).

== Academic programs ==
Metalworks Institute delivers programs on-campus and online in four core streams:

=== Live Music ===
- Live Event & Concert Production Diploma
- Live Sound Diploma
- Stage Lighting & Video Diploma

=== Music Business ===
- Music Business Diploma

=== Music Performance ===
- Music Performance Advanced Diploma

=== Recorded Music ===
- Audio Production & Engineering Diploma
- Electronic Music Production Diploma
- Music Mixing & Mastering (Post Graduate) Diploma
- Recording Engineering Diploma

=== Interdisciplinary Programs ===
- Music Performance & Technology Advanced Diploma
- Professional Sound (Audio Specialist) Diploma
- Professional Sound & Business (Studio Production Major) Advanced Diploma
- Professional Sound & Business (Recording Engineering Major) Advanced Diploma
- Professional Sound & Business (Live Production Major) Advanced Diploma

=== Metalworks Online Part-time Certificate Courses ===
The online extension of Metalworks Institute offers a number of Certificate courses in audio production and music technology. These certificate courses are designed to be completed on a part-time basis, allowing flexibility for individuals seeking to advance their expertise in specific areas of music production and audio engineering.

Metalworks Online is officially certified as an Avid Certified Learning Partner and offers certified training in Pro Tools for both music and post-production as well as for live Venue (sound system). They also offer certificate courses in Apple's Logic Pro, Steinberg Cubase, Ableton Live and Reason.

== Flagship Campus and Educational Facilities ==
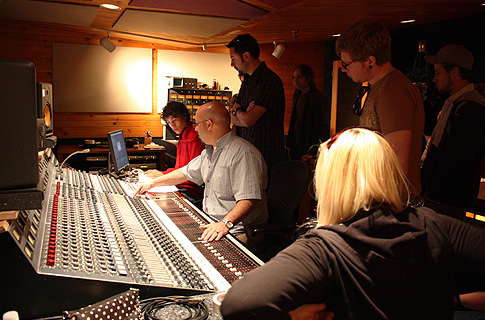
Metalworks Institute's Recording Studios for Student Use.

Metalworks Institute's flagship campus is located in Mississauga, Ontario, adjacent to Metalworks Studios and Metalworks Production Group. There are regularly scheduled campus tours which are open to the public. Prospective students and parents are able to meet the school faculty and find information related to the programs, courses, and student resources offered at Metalworks Institute.

=== Educational Amenities ===
Metalworks Institute's studios were designed by acoustician Terry Medwedyk. The equipment used by the institute to educate its students is the same as that used by the professional clients who make use of Metalworks Studios. The studios are equipped with SSL and ICON consoles, Pro Tools HD systems and a wide variety of industry standard microphones, plug-ins and vintage outboard equipment. The Institute's partnership with Metalworks Production Group also gives the show production students access to the equipment used to produce a large variety of live events such as concerts, theatrical productions, large and small scale business conferences trade shows and conventions. The institute has four professional recording studios dedicated to student use.

== Notable alumni ==
- Abby V, Juno-Nominated artist
- Akeel Henry, Jack Richardson Recording Engineer of the Year at the Juno Awards of 2023
- Alessia De Gasperis, formerly known as Kai, Canadian singer-songwriter
- Alex Dimauro, bassist in Juno-nominated (2021, 2022) Valley
- Angie Randisi, multi-platinum & GRAMMY-nominated recording/mixing engineer
- Braden Bales, Nashville-based singer/songwriter
- Crispin Day, Songwriter, Producer, Engineer, Founder of Good People Only
- Darren 'Jeter' Magierowski, Producer/Engineer Jukasa Studios
- Desiree da Silva, Engineer, Orange Lounge
- Greg Moffett, Engineer OVO Sound
- Harley Arsenault, Producer OVO Sound
- Jad "Oupsing" El Khoury - Mix Assistant OVO Sound
- Jason "Redz" Reynolds, Monitor Engineer/Production Manager (Shaggy), Monitor Engineer (Stephen Marley), Manager (Jully Black)
- Jeff Crake, GRAMMY-winning Member of Rainer + Grimm
- Kevin Dietz, Recording Engineer
- Mercy Chinwo, Nigerian Gospel Singer
- Michael "Mickey" Brandolino, producer, former guitarist in Juno-nominated (2021, 2022) Valley
- Navraj "Nav" Singh Goraya, rapper
- Noel Cadastre, GRAMMY-winning mixer, music producer, audio engineer OVO Sound
- Rainer Millar Blanchaer, GRAMMY-winning Member of Rainer + Grimm
- Riley Bell, Jack Richardson Recording Engineer of the Year at the Juno Awards of 2018, member of New West (band)
- Robert Laska, vocalist in Juno-nominated (2021, 2022) Valley
- Santiago Echeverri Buitrago, Engineer
- Shin Kamiyama, GRAMMY-nominated engineer at XO
- Terence "Polun" Lam, producer, composer and lyricist (with Drake and Alessia Cara credits)
- Tim Oxford, drummer in The Arkells
- Travis "djtj" Sewchan, Engineer, Promoter, Producer, DJ, Entrepreneur
- Wayne Cochrane, Engineer
- WondaGurl, record producer
