= Edge of Excess =

Studio album by Triumph
- Released: 27 October 1992 (Canada); 12 January 1993 (U.S.)
- Recorded: 1992
- Studio: Metalworks Studios, Mississauga, Ontario, Canada
- Genre: Hard rock; heavy metal
- Length: 47:26
- Label: Virgin; Victory
- Producer: Mike Levine; Noel Golden

Triumph chronology
| Surveillance (1987) | Edge of Excess (1992) | King Biscuit Flower Hour (In Concert) (1996) |

Edge of Excess is the tenth and final studio album by Canadian hard rock band Triumph, and the only one not to feature original guitarist and lead singer Rik Emmett who left the band in 1988, leaving Gil Moore as the sole lead vocalist. After a few years of inactivity, Moore and bassist Mike Levine recruited session guitarist Phil X to replace Emmett and released Edge of Excess in 1992. The song "Troublemaker" was featured in the 1992 film Hellraiser III: Hell on Earth.

Professional ratings
Review scores
| Source | Rating |
|---|---|
| Allmusic | link |

== Track listing ==
All tracks are written by Gil Moore, Michael Levine, and Mladen Alexander, except where noted.

| No. | Title | Writer(s) | Length |
|---|---|---|---|
| 1. | "Child of the City" | | 5:03 |
| 2. | "Troublemaker" | | 4:06 |
| 3. | "It's Over" | | 4:21 |
| 4. | "Edge of Excess" | Moore; Levine; Alexander; Phil "X" Xenedis | 4:44 |
| 5. | "Turn My Back on Love" | | 4:06 |
| 6. | "Ridin' High Again" | Moore; Levine; Xenedis | 4:55 |
| 7. | "Black Sheep" | | 5:25 |
| 8. | "Boy's Night Out" | | 5:19 |
| 9. | "Somewhere Tonight" | | 4:35 |
| 10. | "Love in a Minute" | Moore; Levine; Alexander; Xenedis | 4:45 |
| Total length: | | | 47:26 |

== Personnel ==
=== Triumph ===
- Gil Moore – lead vocals, drums, percussion
- Michael Levine – bass, keyboards, synthesizers, backing vocals
- Phil "X" Xenidis – guitar

=== Additional personnel ===
- Mladen Alexander – guitar
- Lawrence Falcomer – guitar
