= Triumph (Triumph album) =

Studio album by Triumph
- Released: October 13, 1976
- Studio: Phase One Studios, Toronto, Ontario, Canada
- Genre: Blues rock; hard rock; progressive rock
- Length: 39:37
- Label: Attic
- Producer: Mike Levine, Doug Hill

Triumph chronology
Triumph (1976)	Rock & Roll Machine (1977)

Alternative cover
- Cover for 1995 CD reissue titled "In the Beginning"

Professional ratings
Review scores
Source	Rating
Allmusic	4/5 stars

Triumph is the debut studio album by Canadian rock band Triumph, released in 1976. The album was remastered and re-released with a new cover and name in 1995 titled In the Beginning (then remastered again in 2005).

== Track listing ==
Side one
No.	Title	Lyrics	Music	Length
1.	"24 Hours a Day"	Rik Emmett	Rik Emmett	4:28
2.	"Be My Lover"	Rik Emmett	Rik Emmett	3:20
3.	"Don't Take My Life"	Gil Moore	Gil Moore	4:58
4.	"Street Fighter"	Rik Emmett	Gil Moore	3:33
5.	"Street Fighter (Reprise)"	Rik Emmett	Gil Moore	3:03

Side two
No.	Title	Lyrics	Music	Length
1.	"What's Another Day of Rock 'N Roll"	Gil Moore	Gil Moore	4:52
2.	"Easy Life"	Rik Emmett	Mike Levine	3:56
3.	"Let Me Get Next to You"	Rik Emmett	Gil Moore, Rik Emmett	3:03
4.	"Blinding Light Show / Moonchild"	Rik Emmett / (Instrumental)	Rik Emmett, Chris Brockway, Denton Young / Rik Emmett	8:41

== Personnel ==
Triumph

- Rik Emmett – guitars, vocals
- Gil Moore – drums, vocals
- Mike Levine – bass

Additional personnel

- Laurie Delgrande – keyboards

Production

- Doug Hill – producer
- Brian Bell – engineer, mixing
- George Semkiw – remixing
- Mick Walsh – assistant
- Mark Wright – assistant
- Scott Hull – digital mastering
- Darko – photography, digital design, cover photo
- Brett Zilahi – digital remastering

== Certifications ==
Region	Certification	Certified units/sales
Canada (Music Canada)	Gold	50,000^{^}
^{^} Shipments figures based on certification alone.
