= Never Surrender (album) =

Studio album by Triumph
- Released: December 1982 (Canada); January 1983 (US)
- Recorded: 1982
- Studios: Metalworks Studios, Mississauga, Ontario
- Genres: Hard rock, heavy metal
- Length: 40:31
- Label: Attic
- Producers: Triumph, David Thoener

Triumph chronology
Allied Forces (1981)	Never Surrender (1982)	Thunder Seven (1984)

Singles from Never Surrender
- 1. "All the Way" Released: 1983; 2. "Never Surrender" Released: 1983; 3. "A World of Fantasy" Released: 1983

Professional ratings
Review scores
Source	Rating
AllMusic	3/5 stars
Rolling Stone	1/5 stars

Never Surrender is the sixth studio album by Canadian hard rock band Triumph, released in 1982. The album reached #26 on the Billboard Albums chart assisted by the singles "All the Way", "A World of Fantasy" and "Never Surrender" which hit #2, #3 and #23, respectively, on the Billboard's Mainstream Top Rock Tracks chart in 1983. "All the Way" (the third of the three tracks to chart) was Triumph's highest charting song on the Top Rock Tracks chart, but did not sustain that level of popularity with Triumph fans as the song is not included on their 1985 live album Stages, the later Classics (a Greatest Hits album) or 2005's Livin' for the Weekend: The Anthology album.

In Canada, the album peaked at No. 29 on the RPM album chart (compared to No. 13 for their previous album, Allied Forces) and none of the singles managed to reach the Top 100 of the RPM Singles chart, although they received some airplay at album-oriented rock stations.

A remastered CD was first released in 1985 on MCA Records (then again in 1995 on the band's own TRC label). A new remaster was released in November 2004 on the band's own label TML Entertainment.

== Track listing ==
All songs by Rik Emmett / Michael Levine / Gil Moore except where otherwise noted.

Side 1

1. "Too Much Thinking" – 5:39 (lead vocals: Gil Moore)
2. "A World of Fantasy" (Emmett, Levine, Moore, Tammy Patrick) – 5:03 (lead vocals: Rik Emmett)
3. "A Minor Prelude" – 0:44 (instrumental)
4. "All the Way" – 3:45 (lead vocals: Rik Emmett)
5. "Battle Cry" – 5:00 (lead vocals: Gil Moore)

Side 2

1. "Overture (Processional)" – 1:52 (instrumental)
2. "Never Surrender" – 6:41 (lead vocals: Rik Emmett)
3. "When the Lights Go Down" – 5:08 (lead vocals: Gil Moore)
4. "Writing on the Wall" – 3:39 (lead vocals: Rik Emmett)
5. "Epilogue (Resolution)" – 2:42 (instrumental)

== Personnel ==
- Rik Emmett – vocals, acoustic guitars, electric guitars, 12-string guitar, slide guitar, pedal steel guitar, guitar synthesizers, guitar pedalboard, Solina, Prophet 5, Fairlight CMI, Yamaha cs80, Oberheim OB-Xa, dobro (8)
- Michael Levine – bass guitar, pianos, E-mu Emulator, MultiMoog, Fairlight CMI, Roland Vocoder VP 330, synthesizers, organ
- Gil Moore – drums, percussion, vocals

== Production ==
- Triumph and David Thoener – producers
- Ed Stone – engineer
- Hugh Cooper – assistant engineer
- Joe Owens – director
- Joe Brescio – mastering
- Brett Zilahi – remastering on 2004 re-issue
- Bob Ludwig – remastering on 1985 and 1995 issues
- Dean Motter – art direction, design

== Charts ==
Chart (1982–1983)	Peak position
Canada Top Albums/CDs (RPM)	36
Swedish Albums (Sverigetopplistan)	31
US Billboard 200	26

== Certifications ==
Region	Certification	Certified units/sales
Canada (Music Canada)	Gold	50,000^{^}
United States (RIAA)	Gold	500,000^{^}
^{^} Shipments figures based on certification alone.
