= Surveillance (Triumph album) =

Studio album by Triumph
- Released: November 1987
- Recorded: February–July 1987
- Studios: Metalworks Studios, Mississauga, ON
- Genres: Hard rock; progressive rock
- Length: 45:26
- Label: MCA
- Producers: Triumph, Thom Trumbo

Triumph chronology
The Sport of Kings (1986)	Surveillance (1987)	Edge of Excess (1992)

Professional ratings
Review scores
Source	Rating
Allmusic	link

Surveillance is the ninth studio album by Canadian hard rock band Triumph, released in November 1987 (see 1987 in music). The album was recorded at Metalworks Studios, Mississauga, Ontario, Canada. This is the last Triumph album to feature Rik Emmett until his return to the band in 2008.

A different version of the song "Running In The Night" would surface on Signal's 1989 album, Loud & Clear, re-titled "Go" and credited solely to Mark Baker and Erik Scott.

== Track listing ==
All tracks are written by Rik Emmett, Mike Levine & Gil Moore, except where noted.

No.	Title	Writer(s)	Length
1.	"Prologue: Into The Forever (instrumental)"		1:01
2.	"Never Say Never"	Emmett, Levine, Moore, Sil Simone	3:36
3.	"Headed For Nowhere"	Emmett, Levine, Moore, Rick Santers	6:07
4.	"All The King's Horses"	Emmett, Levine, Moore, Steve Morse	1:47
5.	"Carry On The Flame"	Emmett, Levine, Moore, Dave Tkaczuk	5:14
6.	"Let The Light (Shine On Me)"		5:33
7.	"Long Time Gone"		5:10
8.	"Rock You Down"		3:57
9.	"Prelude: The Waking Dream (instrumental)"		1:13
10.	"On And On"		3:49
11.	"All Over Again"	Roger Freeland, Joe Pizzulo	3:57
12.	"Running In The Night"	Emmett, Levine, Moore, Mark Baker, Erik Scott	3:51

== Personnel ==
- Rik Emmett – guitars, synthesizers, lead vocals, Synclavier II, Fairlight CMI Series III programming
- Gil Moore – drums, percussion, vocals
- Mike Levine – bass guitar, keyboards, synthesizers, Emulator II

=== Additional musicians ===
- J. D. Roberts – newscast on "Carry on the Flame"
- Steve Morse – acoustic guitar on "All the King's Horses" and electric lead guitar on "Headed for Nowhere"
- Dave Tkaczuk – synthesizer, keyboards, programming
- Greg Loates – percussion, programming, effects, producer
- Hugh Cooper – sound effects, research, engineer
- Joel Feeney – backing vocals
- Joel Wade – backing vocals, chant, choir, chorus
- Paul Henderson – backing vocals, chant, choir, chorus
- Ross Munro – choir, chorus, chant
- John Alexander – choir, chorus, chant
- Noel Golden – choir, chorus, chant

== Production ==
- Thom Trumbo – producer
- Ed Stone – mixing
- Bill Kennedy – engineer
- Christopher Pritchard – assistant engineer
- Bob Ludwig – mastering
- Brett Zilahi – digital remastering
- Alex Andronache – studio coordinator
- Dave Dickson – technical consultant
- Dean Motter – illustrations, cover art
- Louie Mann – art direction, concept, design
- Adamoff – cover art concept

== Charts ==
Chart (1987)	Peak position
Canada Top Albums/CDs (RPM)	35
US Billboard 200	82

== Certifications ==
Region	Certification	Certified units/sales
Canada (Music Canada)	Gold	50,000^{^}
^{^} Shipments figures based on certification alone.

== Release history ==
Region	Date	Label
Canada	November 1987	MCA
United States	November 1987	MCA
United Kingdom	November 1987	MCA
Japan	1987	AIRMAIL
Canada	October 3, 1995	TCD
United States	April 12, 2005	TRC
United States	May 16, 2005	Castle
United Kingdom	May 23, 2005	TRC
Canada	September 2, 2005	Magada
Japan	September 2, 2005	JVC
Japan	March 7, 2008	Airmail
