= Hold On (Triumph song) =

Single by Triumph

from the album Just a Game
- B-side: "Just a Game"
- Released: June 1979
- Recorded: 1978
- Genre: Rock
- Length: 6:06 (album version); 2:59 (single version)
- Label: RCA
- Songwriter: Rik Emmett
- Producer: Mike Levine

Triumph singles chronology
"Lay It on the Line" (1979)	"Hold On" (1979)	"American Girls" (1984)

Music video
- "Hold On" on YouTube

"Hold On" is a song by the band Triumph. It appeared on their album Just a Game (1979) and was also released as a single. The single was released in June 1979 and rose to number 38 on the Billboard Hot 100. The song was written by Rik Emmett.

== History ==
Rik Emmett said the song started as he was singing open vowels over some chord changes, and then he started saying the words "Hold on, hold on" out of holding the open vowel notes. "So now I was going to say, "Okay, so the song's going to be called 'Hold On.' What am I going to hold on for? Well, I'm going to hold on to my dreams." Then the lyrics grew backwards out of the hook," he said.

“I would look at people going apeshit at our concerts and think: ‘What are we offering them?’ If we’re going to be called Triumph, we need to give them some inspiration, something positive. When I wrote Hold On it was like: ‘Okay, maybe this is why I’m doing this. Maybe I can write songs that make people feel better about themselves.’”

The introduction's verses were a poem Rik Emmett had written for English class in high school. Emmett often sings the second verse after the bridge in live performances, and wishes he would have done so on the original recording. The disco breakdown was inspired by the R&B scene in Toronto in the late 1970s, and the post-breakdown guitar chords had up to 24 tracks layered on top of each other.

The song, like "Lay It on the Line" from the same album, was written two years before the release of the album. After failing to be noticed as an acoustic track in concert the band decided to make it a rock song and placed it at the end of the concept song, The Twisted Maze which compasses the entire second side of the vinyl.

The song was rarely performed by the entire band in concert, due to its broad and complex arrangements. The live version from Stages, which is the only official live version, was done acoustically.

The B-side is the title track for the album.

The single version of the song was cut up and altered to help its chart potential, where it became only a two-minute-and-fifty-nine-second track. The edit did not include the acoustic folk section of the beginning or the disco-styled breakdown at the end.

== Track listing ==
1. "Hold On" (Rik Emmett) – 2:59
2. "Just a Game" (Rik Emmett) – 5:48

== Personnel ==
- Rik Emmett – guitar, lead vocals
- Mike Levine – bass, backing vocals
- Gil Moore – drums, backing vocals, percussion

== Charts ==
Chart (1979)	Peak position
Canada Top Singles (RPM)	33
US Billboard Hot 100	38
