= Living for the Weekend =

Living for the Weekend or Livin' for the Weekend may refer to:

== Albums ==
- Living for the Weekend (The Saturdays album), 2013
- Livin' for the Weekend: The Anthology, a 2012 compilation album by Triumph
- Living for the Weekend, an album by Jill Jones, on Peace Bisquit label 2009

== Songs ==
- "Living for the Weekend" (Hard-Fi song)
- "Livin' for the Weekend" (Dina Carroll song)
- "Livin' for the Weekend" (The O'Jays song)
- "Living for the Weekend", song by Rockers Revenge, 1984
- "Livin' for the Weekend", song by Fitz and the Tantrums from All the Feels, 2019
