= Nuthouse =

Nuthouse or The Nuthouse may refer to:

- A pejorative term for a psychiatric hospital
- Nuthouse (album), 1990 album by the Canadian band Haywire
- Nuthouse (or Da Nuthouse), a musical group; collaborators of Lawrence Arnell
- The Nuthouse, a 1951 Swedish comedy film
- Nuthouse Fargo (1928–2008), American wrestler better known as Sonny Fargo
