= Bad Boys (Haywire album) =

Studio album by Haywire
- Released: 1986
- Studios: Metalworks Studios, Toronto
- Genre: Hard rock
- Label: Attic
- Producer: Brian Allen

Haywire chronology
Bad Boys (1986)	Don't Just Stand There (1987)

Bad Boys is the debut album by Canadian band Haywire that was released in 1986.

== Track listing ==
No.	Title	Writer(s)	Length
1.	"Bad Bad Boy"	Birt, MacAusland	3:40
2.	"Standin' in Line"	Birt, Rashed	3:50
3.	"(She's Not) The Kind of Girl"	Birt, Rashed, MacAusland	3:26
4.	"Holding You"	Rashed, MacAusland	4:29
5.	"Out of My Head"	Birt	3:07
6.	"When You Fall Out of Love"	Birt, Rashed, MacAusland	3:23
7.	"3 Wishes"	Rashed, Birt, MacAusland	4:19
8.	"Girl in Love"	Birt, MacAusland	3:38
9.	"Shot in the Dark"	Birt, Rashed	3:26
10.	"Crazy"	Birt, Rashed	3:00

== Personnel ==
- Paul MacAusland - vocals
- David Rashed - keyboards and backing vocals
- Marvin Birt - guitars and backing vocals
- Ronnie Switzer - bass
- Sean Kilbride - drums

=== Additional musicians ===
- Ron LeBlanc - drums on "Crazy", "Girl in Love", "Out of My Head"
