= Rainer + Grimm =

Canadian DJ duo

Rainer + Grimm are a Canadian house music production/DJ duo, formed by Rainer Millar Blanchaer and Jeff 'Grimm' Crake.

== Career ==
Rainer Millar Blanchaer and Jeff Crake met at Mississauga based recording school Metalworks Institute in 2013. Whilst attending class the two discovered their mutual appreciation for club music. Finding a common ground, the duo set forth completing the Live Forever EP under the alias We Were Born Electric, which was released on the label Dirty Duck Audio in 2013. WWBE was awarded a MuchFACT grant to direct and produce the video for Live Forever, featuring Saidah Conrad.

In 2014, Rainer and Jeff decided to rebrand their project as Rainer + Grimm. The rebrand was launched with various bootleg remixes, released on SoundCloud. The most prominent, a bootleg remix of Sam Smith's Stay With Me was widely received in the blogosphere, hitting #1 on Hype Machine's most popular list twice and was listed as one of 2014's most blogged tracks on Hypem.com. This success lead to Carson Daly playing the remix for Sam Smith during his first radio interview in LA. The next day Capitol Records decided to make the remix official and it was subsequently sent to Dance Radio in the US. It has since been shazaamed over 250k times and streamed over 5 million.

The follow-up remix to Sam Smith's Stay With Me was their official take on Golden Coast's Break My Fall, which also hit #1 on Hype Machine's most popular chart in 2014. Rainer + Grimm's Break My Fall remix has since been streamed over 3 million times. Since then, Rainer + Grimm have been commissioned to remix various artists including Years & Years, Jessie Ware, Gregory Porter, and Kideko.

In 2015, Rainer + Grimm went on the 6 date Feel Something US Tour and saw them sign to Universal Music Canada. Their first release on UMG Canada, Talk To Me, was launched in November 2015 and hit #1 on Hype Machine's most popular chart. Talk To Me was licensed to Casablanca Records for the USA. R+G were awarded a MuchFACT grant to direct and produce the music video for Talk To Me, which - when released - hit heavy rotation on MuchMusic. 2015's traction and raise in profile lead to Spotify naming them a 2015 Spotlight Artist for Canada. Talk To Me has since been streamed over 5.5 million times.

In 2016, Rainer + Grimm performed at festivals including Splash House, Escapade Festival and Digital Dreams. They also released their second original single 'Do It Right' on former Universal Sub Label Physical Presents.

In 2017, R+G created an umbrella brand named Bleeding Hearts Club as a response to their plight in the label system, with the idea that it would house their content moving forward. Rainer + Grimm released a 4-song EP titled The Bridge in Q1 2017 under the Bleeding Hearts Club banner and supported the release with a 13 date North American tour with Viceroy, announced via a Dancing Astronauts mix series. The Bridge was followed up a single - 'Ruler', released in the summer of 2017.

== Production work ==
Rainer is credited for co-writing the Weeknd's break out hit Wicked Games as well as "The Party & The After Party'" and Drake's Shot for Me. Rainer + Grimm are credited for co-producing Allan Rayman's Much Too Much, as well as Allan Rayman's 'All At Once'.

== Accolades ==
- The Weeknd – Wicked Games, Party & The After Party (Trilogy) – Gold/Platinum Record – co-writer
- Drake – Shot For Me (Take Care) – Diamond Record, Grammy Award – co-writer
- Drake – Nothing Was The Same (Album) – Diamond Record, Grammy Award – Assistant Engineer
