= Mississauga Music Walk of Fame =

Mississauga Music Walk of Fame was established in 2012 by late Councillor Jim Tovey in Memorial Park in Port Credit, Mississauga, Ontario, to recognize musical talent that have their origins in the Ontario city. It was launched during the Southside Shuffle music festival.

== Inductees ==
2012

- Ronnie Hawkins
- Gil Moore, Triumph, owner of MetalWorks recording studio
- Krisztina Szabo
- Oscar Peterson, posthumously

2013

- Eleanor Calbes, opera singer
- Charlie Camilleri, Canadian music industry pioneer
- Rik Emmett, Triumph guitarist
- Chuck Jackson, Southside Blues and Jazz founder, Downchild Blues Band
- Nancy Walker, jazz pianist

2014

- Billy Talent
- Joey Cee, music promoter
- Ron Harrison, film and television composer
- Tommy Hunter

2015

- John Bride, guitarist
- Neill Dixon, manager
- Denny Doherty, The Mamas and The Papas
- Rob Wells, writer/producer

2016

- Bobby Dean Blackburn
- Steve Demarchi
- Jeff Healey
- Cliff Hunt

2017

- Fito Blanko
- Randy Lennox
- Alex Pangman
- Liberty Silver

2018

- Jim Tovey

2019

- Phil X
- Prakash John

2020

- Patti Jannetta
