= Get Off (Haywire album) =

Studio album by Haywire
- Released: 1992
- Genre: Hard rock
- Label: Attic
- Producers: Mark S. Berry, Marvin Birt, David Rashed

Haywire chronology
Nuthouse (1990)	Get Off (1992)

Get Off is the fourth album by the Canadian band Haywire, released in 1992. It was the band's final album. Haywire supported it with a Canadian tour.

== Critical reception ==
Professional ratings
Review scores
Source	Rating
Calgary Herald	B+

The Calgary Herald wrote that "Haywire opts for some serious '90s sounds ... That means a mix of Van Halenesque rockers and decidedly funky rhythms."

== Track listing ==
No.	Title	Writer(s)	Length
1.	"Hypnautica"	Birt	1:46
2.	"Down on You"	Birt, Rashed, MacAusland, Kilbride	3:18
3.	"Get Back"	Birt, Rashed, MacAusland	3:50
4.	"The Worst Part"	Birt, Rashed, MacAusland, Kilbride	3:51
5.	"Wanna Be the One"	Birt, Rashed, Kilbride	4:08
6.	"Buzz"	Birt, Rashed, Kilbride, MacAusland	4:53
7.	"The Bunker"	Birt	1:08
8.	"All Talk, No Action"	Birt, Rashed, MacAusland, Kilbride	4:05
9.	"Move Over"	Janis Joplin	4:19
10.	"One Heart"	Birt, Rashed, Kilbride, MacAusland	4:15
11.	"Knuckles"	Birt	2:41
12.	"Love Needs a Hand"	Birt, Rashed, MacAusland, Kilbride	5:34

== Personnel ==
- Paul MacAusland – vocals
- David Rashed – keyboards, backing vocals
- Marvin Birt – guitars, backing vocals
- Ronnie Switzer – bass
- Sean Kilbride – drums and percussion
