= Chick Camilleri =

Canadian football player (1923–2011)

Profile
- Position: Quarterback

Personal information
- Born: April 3, 1923; Toronto, Canada
- Died: December 23, 2011 (aged 88); Toronto, Canada
- Listed weight: 145 lb (66 kg)

Career history
- 1946–1948: Toronto Argonauts

Awards and highlights
- Grey Cup champion (1946, 1947)

Charles Camilleri (April 3, 1923 – December 23, 2011) was a Canadian professional football player who played for the Toronto Argonauts. He won the Grey Cup with Toronto in 1946 and 1947. He later worked for CBS Records. In 2013, Camilleri was inducted into the Mississauga Music Walk of Fame.
