= Eleanor Calbes =

Filipina soprano (1940–2016)

Background information
- Born: February 20, 1940; Aparri, Philippines
- Died: April 19, 2016 (aged 76)
- Occupation: soprano

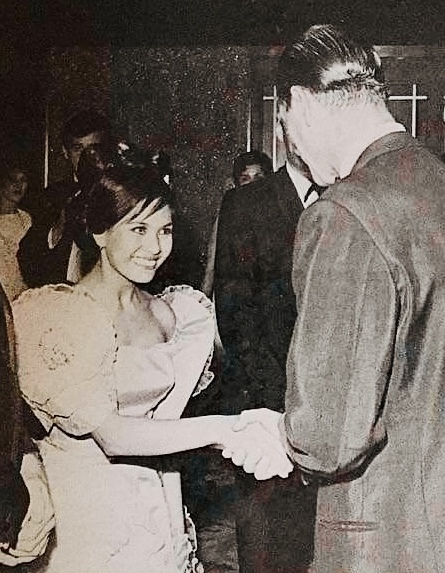
Eleanor Calbes with Prince Philip

Eleanor Calbes (20 February 1940 – 19 April 2016) was a Filipino soprano. Calbes performed globally until retiring in September 2012. She was inducted into the Mississauga Music Walk of Fame in 2013.

== Early life and education ==
Calbes was born in Aparri, Cagayan in the Philippines. In 1961, she completed a diploma in education. Calbes was also awarded a scholarship with The Royal Conservatory of Music in Toronto.

== Career ==
Calbes began her opera career with the Bayanihan Philippine National Folk Dance Company before performing with the Canadian Opera Company from 1963 to 1967 and becoming a Canadian citizen. Outside of Canada, Calbes sang in various parts of the world including the United States, Germany and the Philippines. During her career, she appeared on and Off-Broadway. She played the role of Liat in the 1965 Off-Broadway revival of South Pacific at New York City Center, and the 1967 Off-Broadway revival at New York State Theatre. She played Tuptim in the 1968 Off-Broadway revival of The King and I at New York City Center. She made her Broadway debut in 1970 in Lovely Ladies, Kind Gentlemen in the role of Lotus Blossom. She is often erroneously cited as the first woman from the Philippines to appear on Broadway, however, this is not true. Neile Adams, born in Manila, appeared in the original Broadway productions of Kismet and The Pajama Game in the 1950s; Jacqueline Awad appeared in the late 1960s Broadway engagement of the National Theatre of the Deaf. Calbes ended her singing career in 2012.

Apart from singing, Calbes began directing musicals in 1983 with a production of The King and I and started Mississauga City Centre Opera in 1985. Calbes also opened studios in dance and singing in Mississauga.

== Personal life and death ==
Calbes was married twice. She had a child, actress and producer Lara Wickes with author David A.B. Wickes. The couple divorced and Eleanor married a fellow Canadian opera singer, John Davidson Thomson.

She died at the age of 76 from cancer.

== Awards and honors ==
In 1996, Calbes was chosen as the best musician of the year for Mississauga. In 2013, Calbes was inducted into the Mississauga Music Walk of Fame. The following year, she won the Laurie Pallett Patron of the Arts award at the 2014 Mississauga Arts Awards.
