= Thunder Seven =

Studio album by Triumph
- Released: November 19, 1984
- Recorded: July–August 1984
- Studios: Metalworks (Mississauga, Ontario)
- Genres: Hard rock, heavy metal
- Length: 40:51
- Label: MCA
- Producers: Eddie Kramer; Triumph

Triumph chronology
Never Surrender (1982)	Thunder Seven (1984)	Stages (1985)

Professional ratings
Review scores
Source	Rating
Allmusic	2/5 stars

Thunder Seven is the seventh studio album by Canadian hard rock band Triumph, released in November 1984. Three songs on the second half of the album follow a concept based on time-related themes.

== Release ==
The album was certified gold in the US by the RIAA, with sales of over 500,000 copies, on April 21, 2003, almost nineteen years after its initial release.

"Follow Your Heart" was the band's highest-charting single of the time, reaching #88 in both the UK and the US. It reached number 35 on the Canada pop chart. The video that was shot to accompany the single was filmed live at the Providence Civic Center in Rhode Island. During the concert, the band announced they would be filming a video after the concert and the audience were free to stay around. "Spellbound" was also released as a single, though it did not prove as successful, only charting in Canada and barely scraping the top 100.

Thunder Seven was the last Triumph album that did not feature any outside writers. All prior Triumph albums, with the exception of 1977's Rock & Roll Machine and 1982's Never Surrender were written entirely by the band members.

=== Artwork ===
The album cover is illustrated by artist Dean Motter and is a mechanized version of the Vitruvian Man by Leonardo da Vinci.

== Track listing ==
All tracks written by Gil Moore, Mike Levine and Rik Emmett, except where noted.

=== Side one ===
1. "Spellbound" – 5:11 (lead vocals: Gil Moore)
2. "Rock Out, Roll On" – 5:18 (lead vocals: Rik Emmett)
3. "Cool Down" – 4:51 (lead vocals: Rik Emmett)
4. "Follow Your Heart" – 3:27 (lead vocals: Gil Moore & Rik Emmett)

=== Side two ===
1. "Time Goes By" – 6:02 (lead vocals: Rik Emmett)
2. "Midsummer's Daydream" (Rik Emmett) – 1:41 (instrumental)
3. "Time Canon" – 1:31 (lead vocals: Rik Emmett)
4. "Killing Time" – 4:14 (lead vocals: Rik Emmett & Gil Moore)
5. "Stranger in a Strange Land" – 5:15 (lead vocals: Rik Emmett)
6. "Little Boy Blues" – 3:43 (instrumental)

== Singles ==
- "Follow Your Heart"/"Stranger in a Strange Land" - MCA 52540; released December 1984 (Canada); released February 1985 (US)
- "Spellbound"/"Cool Down" - MCA-52520; released January 1985 (Canada and US)
- "Killing Time"/"Rock Out Roll On" - MCA 52635; Promo; December 1985 (US and Canada)

== Personnel ==
- Rik Emmett – vocals, guitars, bass guitar, music sequencer, Prophet 5 synthesizer, Roland Jupiter 8, Synclavier, Fairlight CMI Series III, Clavinet, bass pedals
- Gil Moore – drums, percussion, vocals
- Michael Levine – bass guitar, keyboards, Prophet 5 synthesizer, Synclavier, organ, Clavinet, bass pedals

with

- Lou Pomanti – synthesizer, keyboards, programming, producer
- Al Rogers – background vocals
- Sandee Bathgate – background vocals
- Dave Dickson – background vocals
- Herb Moore – background vocals
- Andy Holland – background vocals

=== Production ===
- Eddie Kramer – producer, mixer
- Ed Stone – engineer
- Hugh Cooper – mixing
- Noel Golden – assistant engineer
- Yoshiro Kuzumaki – mastering on original LP
- Bob Ludwig – mastering on CD issues
- Brett Zilahi – re-mastering on 2004 re-issue
- Dean Motter – art direction, illustration, design

== Charts ==
Chart (1984–1985)	Peak position
Canada Top Albums/CDs (RPM)	37
Swedish Albums (Sverigetopplistan)	43
US Billboard 200	35

== Certifications ==
Region	Certification	Certified units/sales
Canada (Music Canada)	Platinum	100,000^{^}
United States (RIAA)	Gold	500,000^{^}
^{^} Shipments figures based on certification alone.
