= Live at the US Festival =

Live album by Triumph
- Released: September 23, 2003
- Recorded: May 29, 1983
- Genre: Hard rock
- Length: 125 minutes
- Label: TML
- Producer: Emmett, Levine, Moore

Triumph chronology
King Biscuit Flower Hour (In Concert)	Live at the US Festival	A Night of Triumph

Professional ratings
Review scores
Source	Rating
Allmusic	link

Live at the Us Festival is a live album and DVD by Canadian rock band Triumph, released in 2003. The massive Us Festival took place over three days, outdoors in San Bernardino, California, on May 28–30, 1983. Triumph appeared on May 29, which was billed as "Heavy Metal Sunday" and included Ozzy Osbourne, Judas Priest, Scorpions, Mötley Crüe, Quiet Riot, and Van Halen. The number of attendees varied during the three days; the crowd was estimated to be about 500,000 strong on "Heavy Metal Sunday". The documentary-style part of the DVD gives a behind-the-scenes look at how their shows are put together; lighting, pyrotechnics, smoke, and lightning techniques are explained. Rik Emmett explains their songwriting process in his home. They interview celebrities like Ronnie James Dio that are at the show. Two videos are included, "Spellbound", and "Follow Your Heart", which showcases a live performance, all in DTS Surround Sound. Gil Moore and Mike Levine reminisce about the performance in a fifteen-minute interview from 2003. To date, there hasn't been a reason given for the omission of "Too Much Thinking" from the live releases.

== Set list ==
1. "Too Much Thinking" (Gil Moore, Michael Levine, Rik Emmett) – 5:26
2. "Allied Forces" (Gil Moore, Michael Levine, Rik Emmett) – 3:41
3. "Lay it on the Line" (Rik Emmett) – 4:30
4. "Never Surrender" (Rik Emmett, Michael Levine, Gil Moore) – 6:37
5. "Magic Power" (Rik Emmett, Michael Levine, Gil Moore) – 5:49
6. "A World of Fantasy" (Rik Emmett, Michael Levine, Gil Moore, Tim Patrick) – 5:32
7. "Rock & Roll Machine" (Gil Moore) – 10:31
8. "When the Lights Go Down" (Gil Moore, Michael Levine, Rik Emmett) – 6:18
9. "Fight the Good Fight" (Rik Emmett, Michael Levine, Gil Moore) – 8:07

== CD Version ==
1. "Allied Forces" (Gil Moore, Michael Levine, Rik Emmett) – 3:41
2. "Lay it on the Line" (Rik Emmett) – 4:30
3. "Never Surrender" (Rik Emmett, Michael Levine, Gil Moore) – 6:37
4. "Magic Power" (Rik Emmett, Michael Levine, Gil Moore) – 5:49
5. "A World of Fantasy" (Rik Emmett, Michael Levine, Gil Moore, Tim Patrick) – 5:32
6. "Rock & Roll Machine" (Gil Moore) – 10:31
7. "When the Lights Go Down" (Gil Moore, Michael Levine, Rik Emmett) – 6:18
8. "Fight the Good Fight" (Rik Emmett, Michael Levine, Gil Moore) – 7:39

== Bonus Track ==
1. "Follow Your Heart" (Gil Moore, Michael Levine, Rik Emmett) – 4:06

== DVD Version ==
1. "Allied Forces" (Gil Moore, Michael Levine, Rik Emmett) – 3:41
2. "Lay it on the Line" (Rik Emmett) – 4:30
3. "Never Surrender" (Rik Emmett, Michael Levine, Gil Moore) – 6:37
4. "Magic Power" (Rik Emmett, Michael Levine, Gil Moore) – 5:49
5. "A World of Fantasy" (Rik Emmett, Michael Levine, Gil Moore, Tim Patrick) – 5:32
6. "Rock & Roll Machine" (Gil Moore) – 10:31
7. "When the Lights Go Down" (Gil Moore, Michael Levine, Rik Emmett) – 6:18
8. "Fight the Good Fight" (Rik Emmett, Michael Levine, Gil Moore) – 8:07

== DVD Bonus Features ==
1. 2003 interview with Mike Levine & Gil Moore
2. Bonus Videos: "Spellbound" and "Follow Your Heart"
3. Inside the Rock and Roll Machine – A forty-minute rockumentary highlighting the explosive Triumph arena rock show.

== Personnel ==
- Rik Emmett – guitar, vocals
- Gil Moore – drums, percussion, vocals, executive producer
- Mike Levine – bass guitar, keyboards, synthesizer and Vocoder

== Production ==
- Gil Moore – executive producer
- Brett Zilahi – mastering
- Joel Kazmi – assistant
- Steve Wozniak – concept
- Joe Aceti – concert director
- Richard Chycki – mixing

== Details ==
- DTS 5.1 Surround
- Dolby Digital 5.1 Surround
- Dolby Digital 2.0 Stereo
- Colour
- Digitally processed
- DTS Sound
- 1.33:1 – Full frame
