= Just a Game (album) =

Studio album by Triumph
- Released: March 1979
- Recorded: Fall & Winter 1978
- Studios: Sounds Interchange, Toronto and Metalworks, Mississauga, ON
- Genres: Hard rock, heavy metal
- Length: 36:22
- Labels: Attic, RCA, TML
- Producer: Mike Levine

Triumph chronology
Rock & Roll Machine (1977)	Just a Game (1979)	Progressions of Power (1980)

Singles from Just a Game
- 1. "Hold On" Released: June 1979; 2. "Lay It on the Line" Released: Fall 1979

Music video
- "Lay It on the Line" on YouTube

Just a Game is the third studio album by Canadian hard rock band Triumph, released in 1979. The album contains one of Triumph's most popular songs on FM album-oriented radio, "Lay it on the Line", and the Top 40 hit "Hold On", which peaked at No. 38 on the Billboard Hot 100 and at No. 33 in Canada.

== Artwork ==
The vinyl LP version of the album featured a sleeve that folded open to reveal a board game (though later pressings just contained a regular vinyl sleeve without this). According to a Rockline interview, the board game was Rik Emmett's idea, but Mike Levine was the one who actually designed it and decided to make it impossible to win.

The front cover of the album revealed a futuristic world where every symbol depicts a song featured on the album.

== Critical reception ==
Professional ratings
Review scores
Source	Rating
AllMusic	4.5/5 stars

The Globe and Mail wrote that, "as Rush has become bogged down in a sea of pretention, Triumph has stuck to the basics and honed its heavy-metal drone to a steely edge."

== Track listing ==
Side 1

1. "Movin' On" (Moore) – 4:07
2. "Lay It on the Line" (Emmett) – 4:02
3. "Young Enough to Cry" (Moore) – 6:03
4. "American Girls" (Moore) – 5:01

Side 2

1. "Just a Game" (Emmett) – 6:13
2. "Fantasy Serenade" (Emmett) – 1:39
3. "Hold On" (Emmett) – 6:04
4. "Suitcase Blues" (Emmett) – 3:01

Cassette release

1. "Movin' On" (Moore) – 4:07
2. "Young Enough to Cry" (Moore) – 6:03
3. "American Girls" (Moore) – 5:01
4. "Lay It on the Line" (Emmett) – 4:02
5. "Suitcase Blues" (Emmett) – 3:01
6. "Just a Game" (Emmett) – 6:13
7. "Fantasy Serenade" (Emmett) – 1:39
8. "Hold On" (Emmett) – 6:04

CD release

1. "Movin' On" (Moore) – 4:07
2. "Lay It on the Line" (Emmett) – 4:02
3. "Young Enough to Cry" (Moore) – 6:03
4. "American Girls" (Moore) – 5:01
5. "Just a Game" (Emmett) – 6:13
6. "Fantasy Serenade" (Emmett) – 1:39
7. "Hold On" (Emmett) – 6:04
8. "Suitcase Blues" (Emmett) – 3:01

== Personnel ==
- Rik Emmett – guitars, vocals
- Gil Moore – drums, vocals
- Mike Levine – bass, keyboards
- Laurie Delgrande – keyboards
- Mike Danna – keyboards
- Beau David – background vocals
- Elaine Overholt – background vocals
- Gord Waszek – background vocals
- Colina Phillips – background vocals
- Rosie Levine – background vocals

Production

- Michael Levine – producer
- Mike Jones – engineer
- Doug Neil – assistant
- George Semkiw – remixing
- Hugh Cooper – assistant
- John Golden – digital mastering
- Brett Zilahi – digital re mastering
- Rene Zamic – cover illustration
- Gary Kremnitz – photography
- Lynne Waggett – photography
- Jim Murray – photography

== Charts ==
Chart (1979)	Peak position
Canada Top Albums/CDs (RPM)	19
US Billboard 200	48

== Certifications ==
Region	Certification	Certified units/sales
Canada (Music Canada)	Platinum	100,000^{^}
United States (RIAA)	Gold	500,000^{^}
^{^} Shipments figures based on certification alone.
