= The Sport of Kings (album) =

Studio album by Triumph
- Released: August 1986
- Recorded: May–August 1986
- Studios: Metalworks and Phase One Studios, Toronto, Canada; One on One, Los Angeles
- Genre: Hard rock
- Length: 42:47
- Label: MCA
- Producers: Mike Clink, Thom Trumbo

Triumph chronology
Stages (1985)	The Sport of Kings (1986)	Surveillance (1987)

Professional ratings
Review scores
Source	Rating
AllMusic	2.5/5 stars
Kerrang!	2/5 stars

The Sport of Kings is the eighth studio album by the Canadian hard rock band Triumph, released in 1986. It was recorded at the band's home studio of Metalworks Studios from May to August 1986. A song from the album, "Somebody's Out There", was the band's biggest hit, reaching number 27 on the Billboard Hot 100 over a 15-week stay in the charts and hitting number 84 in the Canadian pop charts.

== History ==
This is the second-to-last studio album with the band's guitarist and co-lead vocalist Rik Emmett, and it clearly represents the difficulties the band was experiencing at the time. Mike Levine played no keyboards on the album; three outside keyboard players were hired to create the keyboard sounds of the album, although Rik Emmett experiments with two high-end sampler systems, the Synclavier 9600 Workstation and the Fairlight CMI Series III, according to Keyboard magazine's July 1986 issue. Emmett sings lead vocals on six of the album's ten songs; four songs were sung by Gil Moore and one track was sung as a duet by the two vocalists. The recording of The Sport of Kings was marred by tension between Triumph and their label MCA. Emmett has since expressed his dislike for much of the album. Adding to the tension was Emmett's request that the recording be done at Estudio L2K in Mallorca, Spain. Only three of this album's songs have ever been performed live by Triumph, and one track was performed live by Emmett during his first three solo tours.

== Promotion ==
On January 16, 1987, during Triumph's Sport of Kings tour, the band recorded A Night of Triumph live album at the Halifax Metro Centre in Nova Scotia. The DVD bonus features included backstage footage from a Triumph concert at Spectrum in Philadelphia. The live album was released in 2004. It also included the video for "Just One Night" and a live performance of "When the Lights Go Down" from the band's appearance at the 1983 US Festival, which itself was previously released as a standalone DVD in 2003 called Live at the US Festival.

== Track listing ==
Side one
No.	Title	Writer(s)	Lead vocals	Length
1.	"Tears in the Rain"	Rik Emmett, Mike Levine, Gil Moore	Gil Moore	3:55
2.	"Somebody's Out There"	Emmett, Levine, Moore	Rik Emmett	4:04
3.	"What Rules My Heart"	Emmett, Levine, Moore, James Brian Maloney, James Richard Huff	Moore	3:52
4.	"If Only"	Emmett, Levine, Moore	Emmett	4:00
5.	"Hooked on You"	Emmett, Levine, Moore	Emmett & Moore	3:22

Side two
No.	Title	Writer(s)	Lead vocals	Length
6.	"Take a Stand"	Emmett, Levine, Moore, Rick Santers	Emmett	4:33
7.	"Just One Night"	Tony Fanucchi, Eric Martin, Neal Schon	Moore	3:40
8.	"Embrujo" (instrumental)	Emmett, Levine, Moore		1:29
9.	"Play with the Fire"	Emmett, Levine, Moore	Emmett	5:18
10.	"Don't Love Anybody Else But Me"	Glenn Miller, Ed Roynesdal	Emmett	3:55
11.	"In the Middle of the Night"	Emmett, Levine, Moore	Emmett	4:34

== Personnel ==
Band members

- Rik Emmett – lead and rhythm guitars, lead and backing vocals, Fairlight CMI, Synclavier programming
- Gil Moore – drums, percussion, lead and backing vocals
- Mike Levine – bass guitar, keyboards, synthesizers, backing vocals

Additional musicians

- Lou Pomanti, Michael Boddicker, Scott Humphrey – synthesizer, synthesizer programming, keyboards
- Johnny Rutledge, David Blamires, Neil Donell – backing vocals

Production

- Mike Clink – producer, engineer
- Noel Golden, Dave Runstedler, Toby Wright, Allen Abrahamson, Ernie Torno – assistant engineers
- Bob Ludwig – mastering
- Thom Trumbo – executive producer
- Tommy Steele – design
- Adamoff – cover art concept
- Brett Zilahi – remastering on 2005 re–issue
- Yoshiro Kuzumaki – mastering
- Harry Witz – engineer, sound advisor

== Charts ==
Chart (1986–1987)	Peak position
Canada Top Albums/CDs (RPM)	51
US Billboard 200	33

== Certifications ==
Region	Certification	Certified units/sales
Canada (Music Canada)	Platinum	100,000^{^}
^{^} Shipments figures based on certification alone.
