= Rock & Roll Machine =

- Cover of the original Canadian edition

Studio album by Triumph
- Released: November 3, 1977
- Recorded: August–September 1977
- Studios: Phase One Studios, Toronto, Canada
- Genres: Hard rock; heavy metal
- Length: 39:12
- Labels: Attic, RCA, TML
- Producers: Mike Levine, Doug Hill

Triumph chronology
Triumph (1976)	Rock & Roll Machine (1977)	Just a Game (1979)

International edition

International edition alternate cover
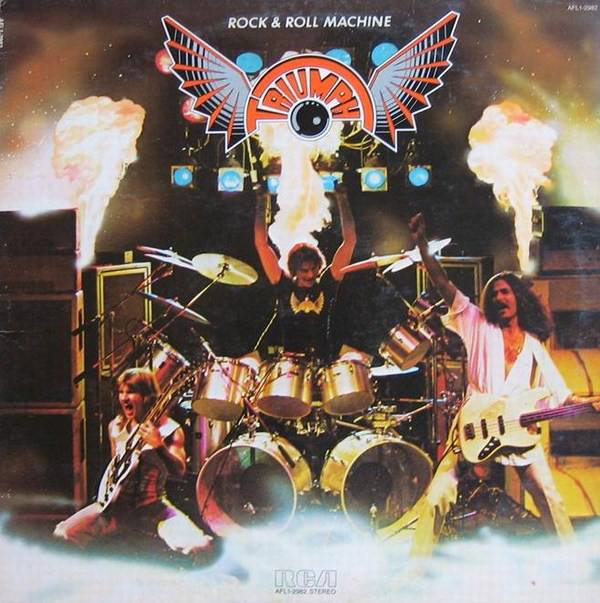

Professional ratings
Review scores
Source	Rating
AllMusic	3.5/5 stars

Rock & Roll Machine (also Rock 'N' Roll Machine) is the second studio album by Canadian hard rock band Triumph. It was first released in 1977 by Attic Records. The album contained the band's first hit, a version of Joe Walsh's "Rocky Mountain Way".

A different "international" version of the album was released on RCA Records in the United States and other countries in June 1978. This edition replaces some tracks from the original Canadian version with tracks from the self-titled debut Triumph (1976) album, along with new artwork.

The album was released for a second time in Canada, with a different cover than the original one or the international one, using the re-sequenced tracks from the international version. The international version was re-issued in the US on MCA Records in 1985.

The song The City: War March / El Duende Agonizante / Minstrel's Lament includes a rearrangement of Mars, the Bringer of War from Gustav Holst's The Planets.

== Track listing (Attic Records, Canada) ==
Side one

No.	Title	Writer(s)	Lead Vocals	Length
1.	"Takes Time"	Rik Emmett, Mike Levine, Gil Moore	Moore	3:48
2.	"Bringing It on Home"	Emmett, Levine	Emmett	4:35
3.	"Little Texas Shaker"	Emmett, Levine, Moore	Moore	3:24
4.	"New York City Streets, Pt. 1"	Moore	Moore	3:09
5.	"New York City Streets, Pt. 2"	Moore	Emmett	4:40

Side two

No.	Title	Writer(s)	Lead Vocals	Length
6.	"The City: War March / El Duende Agonizante / Minstrel's Lament"	Emmett	instrumental / instrumental / Emmett	9:20
7.	"Rocky Mountain Way"	Joe Walsh, Joe Vitale, Kenny Passarelli, Rocke Grace	Moore	4:04
8.	"Rock & Roll Machine"	Moore	Moore	6:53

== Track listing (International version) ==
The RCA and MCA re-sequenced track listing is as follows:

Side one

1. "Takes Time" (Emmett, Moore, Levine) – 3:48
2. "Bringing It On Home" (Emmett, Levine) – 4:35
3. "Rocky Mountain Way" (Walsh, Vitale, Passarelli, Grace) – 4:04
4. "Street Fighter" (Emmett, Moore) – 3:30
5. "Street Fighter (Reprise)" (Emmett, Moore) – 3:02

Side two

1. "24 Hours a Day" (Emmett) – 4:17
2. "Blinding Light Show/Moonchild" (Emmett, Brockway, Young) – 8:43
3. "Rock and Roll Machine" (Moore) – 6:53

== Personnel ==
- Rik Emmett – guitars, vocals
- Gil Moore – drums, percussion, vocals
- Mike Levine – bass, keyboards
- Laurie Delgrande – keyboards
- Mike Danna – keyboards
- Beau David – background vocals
- Elaine Overholt – background vocals
- Gord Waszek – background vocals
- Colina Phillips – background vocals
- Rosie Levine – background vocals

== Production ==
- Michael Levine – producer
- Mike Jones – engineer
- George Semkiw – remixing
- Doug Neil – assistant
- Hugh Cooper – assistant
- John Golden – digital mastering
- Brett Zilahi – digital remastering
- Rene Zamic – cover illustration
- Gary Kremnitz – photography
- Lynne Waggett – photography
- Jim Murray – photography

== Charts ==
Chart (1977–1978)	Peak position
Canada Top Albums/CDs (RPM)	19
US Billboard 200	182

== Certifications ==
Region	Certification	Certified units/sales
Canada (Music Canada)	2× Platinum	200,000^{^}
^{^} Shipments figures based on certification alone.

== Release history ==
Region	Date	Label
Canada	November 3, 1977	Attic
Canada	April 2, 1977	RCA
United States	June 24, 1978	RCA
United States	October 3, 1995	TCD
United States	April 12, 2005	TRC
United States	May 16, 2005	Castle
Canada	September 2, 2005	Magada
Japan	March 7, 2008	Airmail
