= Don't Just Stand There =

Studio album by Haywire
- Released: 1987
- Studios: Metalworks, Toronto
- Genres: Rock, hard rock
- Label: Attic
- Producer: Brian Allen

Haywire chronology
Bad Boys (1986)	Don't Just Stand There (1987)	Nuthouse (1990)

Don't Just Stand There is the second album by the Canadian band Haywire. It was released 1987 via Attic Records. "Dance Desire", a hit in Canada, was released as a single. The album sold more than 100,000 copies by the end of 1987.

== Production ==
The band desired to make a harder album than their pop rock debut. They wrote 35 songs for Don't Just Stand There, although Attic asked them to work on more songs with cowriters. Ten of the album's 11 songs are from the original pool of 35.

== Critical reception ==
Professional ratings
Review scores
Source	Rating
AllMusic	3/5 stars

The Toronto Star called "'One Heart Affair' and 'Separate Dreams' are tightly crafted and rhythmically involving pieces of Top 40 rock."

== Track listing ==
No.	Title	Writer(s)	Length
1.	"Dance Desire"	Birt, Rashed, MacAusland, Kilbride	4:04
2.	"One Heart Affair"	Birt, Rashed, MacAusland, Kilbride	4:29
3.	"Black and Blue"	Birt, Rashed, MacAusland	4:10
4.	"Fire"	Birt, Rashed, Kilbride	4:26
5.	"Man Enough"	Birt, Rashed, MacAusland, Kilbride	4:25
6.	"Hard Reaction"	Taylor Rhodes, Birt, MacAusland, Kilbride	3:56
7.	"Affection"	Birt, Rashed, MacAusland, Kilbride	3:30
8.	"Separate Dreams"	Birt, Rashed, MacAusland	3:58
9.	"Angel"	Birt, Rashed, MacAusland	3:54
10.	"Thinkin' About the Years"	Birt, Rashed	5:07

=== CD bonus track ===
No.	Title	Writer(s)	Length
11.	"Dance Desire (Basuchi Mix)"	Birt, Rashed, MacAusland, Kilbride	7:45

=== 2003 CD bonus track ===
No.	Title	Writer(s)	Length
12.	"Oh Oh Oh (Why Can't It Be Me Tonight)"	Birt, MacAusland	3:55

== Personnel ==
- Paul MacAusland - vocals
- David Rashed - keyboards and backing vocals
- Marvin Birt - guitars and backing vocals
- Ronnie Switzer - bass
- Sean Kilbride - drums and percussion

Additional musicians

- Backing vocals: Sheree Jeacocke
