= Progressions of Power =

Studio album by Triumph
- Released: March 1980
- Recorded: December 1979–January 1980
- Studios: Phase One Studios, Toronto, Ontario
- Genres: Hard rock, heavy metal
- Length: 41:08
- Label: Attic
- Producer: Triumph

Triumph chronology
Just a Game (1979)	Progressions of Power (1980)	Allied Forces (1981)

Singles from Progressions of Power
- 1. "I Can Survive" Released: 1980; 2. "I Live for the Weekend" Released: 1980

Professional ratings
Review scores
Source	Rating
AllMusic	4/5 stars

Progressions of Power is the fourth studio album by Canadian hard rock band Triumph, released in 1980. The album reached number 32 on the Billboard 200 and the single "I Can Survive" hit number 91 on the Billboard Hot 100 in 1980. The single "I Live for the Weekend", though not a success in the band's home country, gave them their only charting single in the United Kingdom, where it peaked at number 59. The album was re-released in 1985 on MCA Records, then on TRC Records in 1995, and remastered in 2005 and re-issued on the band's own label TML Entertainment (formerly known as TRC Records).

== Track listing ==
All tracks are written by Rik Emmett, Mike Levine, Gil Moore.

No.	Title	Length
1.	"I Live for the Weekend"	5:18
2.	"I Can Survive"	4:00
3.	"In the Night"	6:16
4.	"Nature's Child"	5:41
5.	"Woman in Love"	4:37
6.	"Take My Heart"	3:28
7.	"Tear the Roof Off"	4:28
8.	"Fingertalkin'"	1:58
9.	"Hard Road"	5:22

== Personnel ==
- Rik Emmett – guitars, Prophet 5 synthesizer, lead vocals on "In The Night", "Take My Heart" & "Hard Road"
- Gil Moore – drums, percussion, lead vocals on "I Live For The Weekend", "I Can Survive", "Nature's Child", "Woman In Love" & "Tear The Roof Off"
- Mike Levine – bass, keyboards

Production

- Robin Brouwers – assistant engineer
- Jeff Stobbs – assistant engineer
- Mick Walsh – assistant engineer
- John Golden – mastering
- Bob Ludwig – remastering on 1985 and 1995 re-issues
- Brett Zilahi – remastering on 2005 re-issue
- John Rowlands – photography
- Nick Sangiamo – photography

== Charts ==
Chart (1980)	Peak position
Canada Top Albums/CDs (RPM)	24
Swedish Albums (Sverigetopplistan)	44
UK Albums (Official Charts)	61
US Billboard 200	32

== Certifications ==
Region	Certification	Certified units/sales
Canada (Music Canada)	Gold	50,000^{^}
^{^} Shipments figures based on certification alone.
