= Nuthouse (album) =

Studio album by Haywire
- Released: 1990
- Studios: Nidaros, Trondheim, Norway
- Genre: Hard rock
- Label: Attic
- Producers: Bjorn Nessjo, Haywire

Haywire chronology
| Don't Just Stand There (1987) | Nuthouse (1990) | Get Off (1992) |

Nuthouse is the third album by the Canadian band Haywire, released in 1990. It went gold in Canada. The album was recorded in Norway with Bjorn Nessjo.

== Critical reception ==
The Toronto Star wrote that "the band carries it off with enough energy to make the borrowings seem their own and with enough enthusiasm to overshadow the occasional lyrical lapses, the guitar hero moves and all the other hackneyed hard-rock trappings that the band has adopted."

== Track listing ==
All tracks are written by Birt, Rashed and MacAusland, except where listed.

| No. | Title | Writer(s) | Length |
|---|---|---|---|
| 1. | "Operator Central" | | 4:14 |
| 2. | "Short End of a Wishbone" | | 3:49 |
| 3. | "Livin' It Up" | | 4:28 |
| 4. | "Gettin' the Groove" | | 4:44 |
| 5. | "Wild Wild" | | 3:24 |
| 6. | "Strange One" | | 3:57 |
| 7. | "She Drives" | | 4:42 |
| 8. | "Well Oiled Machine" | | 4:14 |
| 9. | "Tremble in Line" | | 3:32 |
| 10. | "Push 'n Shove (That's the Way)" | | 4:10 |
| 11. | "Taken the Pain" | Birt, Rashed, Kilbride, MacAusland | 5:08 |

== Personnel ==
- Paul MacAusland – vocals
- David Rashed – keyboards, backing vocals
- Marvin Birt – guitars, backing vocals
- Ronnie Switzer – bass
- Sean Kilbride – drums and percussion
