= Haywire (band) =

Canadian band

- Origin: Charlottetown, Prince Edward Island, Canada
- Genres: Hard rock; glam metal
- Years active: 1981–1993; 2004–present
- Label: Attic
- Members: David Rashed; Paul MacAusland; Marvin Birt; Ronnie Switzer; Sean Kilbride
- Past members: Ron LeBlanc
- Website: www.haywireband.ca

Haywire is a Canadian rock band, originally from Charlottetown, Prince Edward Island.

== History ==
Haywire was formed in Charlottetown in 1981 by Paul MacAusland (vocals), Marvin Birt (guitar/vocals), David Rashed (keys/vocals), Ronnie Switzer (bass/vocals), and Scott Roberts (drums). Ron "Bumble" LeBlanc replaced Roberts in 1984, playing with the band through their demo, EP, and three cuts on their debut Attic release before leaving to continue his education. Mac Cole filled the drum seat briefly until Sean Kilbride (a long-time friend of the band) rounded out the line-up.

In 1984, they won the "Q104 Homegrown" (Volume 1) contest; the first prize was the chance to record a single, but the band took the opportunity to invest additional money of their own and record a five-song EP, Haywire (1985), which eventually sold over 5,000 copies in the Maritimes. In 1985, they won the Labatt's "Battle of the Bands" competition, and used the $10,000 first prize to record more material. In 1986, the group signed a recording contract with Canadian independent label Attic Records.

Their first album, Bad Boys (1986), went platinum in Canada, while the title track became a Top 40 hit. The following year, they released Don't Just Stand There (1987), which also went platinum, and contained their highest charting hit, the hard-driving, "Dance Desire". A promised third video was not forthcoming from the label, so Haywire financed the video for "Fire" themselves.

Throughout the late 1980s, Haywire toured with other popular Canadian rockers such as Helix, Honeymoon Suite and Kim Mitchell. They also represented Canada in the World Popular Song Festival in Japan, where "Dance Desire" won the award for best song. Despite their success in Canada, and interest from managers Doc McGee (Bon Jovi, Mötley Crüe, Skid Row) and Q Prime (Def Leppard, Metallica, Queensrÿche) and label interest from Chrysalis Records, they were unable to secure a U.S. recording contract due to limitations related to their contract with Attic Records.

The follow-up album, Nuthouse (1990), was recorded in Norway with producer Bjorn Nessjo. Unsatisfied with the final mix of the album, Haywire flew back to Canada and remixed it themselves; the final result was a harder edged, guitar-driven record. The videos for the first two singles, "Short End of a Wishbone" and "Operator Central", were the most expensive Canadian music videos produced that year. Although it hit platinum sales, the album represented a major change in musical direction, and as a result alienated some of the younger fans of the band's first two records. While it did garner significant AOR radio airplay and was well-received, the record company was unenthusiastic about the new direction and following, and as a result Attic halted promotion of the album without a promised third video.

The band produced one more album, Get Off (1992), which was critically well-received, but again did not receive adequate support from the record company. Haywire produced the album's first two videos ("Get Back" and "Wanna Be the One") for the price of one, with the label promising a third for the single "Buzz" (their second-highest charting single, at No. 13) which ultimately was not produced. After prolonged contractual struggles, the group refused to re-sign with Attic; to fulfill Haywire's contractual obligations, Attic released a greatest hits CD in 1993 (entitled Wired: The Best of Haywire) without the band's input.

The band had their albums re-issued in the United States on CD through Unidisc Music.

In November 2006, Haywire were awarded the Music Prince Edward Island Lifetime Achievement Award. In 2011, Haywire were presented with the Dr. Helen Creighton 'Lifetime Achievement Award' from the East Coast Music Association (ECMA)

Haywire continues to tour and work on a new album, which has yet to receive a release date.

On April 5, 2022, the band announced that former drummer Ron LeBlanc had died.

== Band members ==
=== Current members ===
- Paul MacAusland – vocals, guitar, percussion (1981–1993, 2004–present)
- Dave Rashed – keyboards, piano, guitars, backing vocals (1981–1993, 2004–present)
- Marvin Birt – guitars, backing vocals (1981–1993, 2004–present)
- Ronnie Switzer – bass, backing vocals (1981–1993, 2004–present)
- Sean Kilbride – drums, percussion (1985–1993, 2004–present)

=== Former members ===
- Scott Roberts – drums (1981–1984)
- Ron "Bumble" LeBlanc – drums (1984–1985; died 2022)
- Mac Cole – drums (1985)

== Discography ==
=== Studio albums ===
- Bad Boys (1986)
- Don't Just Stand There (1987)
- Nuthouse (1990)
- Get Off (1992)

=== Compilation albums ===
- Wired: The Best of Haywire (1993)

=== Extended plays ===
- Haywire (1985)

=== Singles ===
- "Bad Bad Boy" (1986) No. 21 CAN
- "Standin' in Line" (1986) No. 71 CAN
- "Shot in the Dark" (1986 - no video) No. 96 CAN
- "Dance Desire" (1987) No. 10 CAN
- "Black and Blue" (1987) No. 37 CAN
- "Thinkin' About the Years" (1988 - no video) No. 35 CAN
- "Fire" (1988)
- "Operator Central" (1989)
- "Short End of a Wishbone" (1990) No. 56 CAN
- "Taken the Pain" (1991 - no video)
- "Get Back" (1992) No. 46 CAN
- "Wanna Be the One" (1992)
- "Buzz" (1992 - no video) No. 13 CAN
