= Allied Forces (album) =

Studio album by Triumph
- Released: September 1981
- Recorded: 1980–1981
- Studios: Metalworks Studios; Mississauga, Ontario, Canada
- Genres: Hard rock, heavy metal
- Length: 38:50
- Label: Attic
- Producer: Triumph

Triumph chronology
Progressions of Power (1980)	Allied Forces (1981)	Never Surrender (1982)

Music video
- "Magic Power (track 2)" on YouTube

Music video
- "Fight the Good Fight (track 6)" on YouTube

Professional ratings
Review scores
Source	Rating
AllMusic	4.5/5 stars
The Rolling Stone Album Guide	1/5 stars

Allied Forces is the fifth studio album by Canadian hard rock band Triumph, released in 1981. It reached #23 on the Billboard Pop Albums chart assisted by the singles "Magic Power" and "Fight the Good Fight," which hit #8 and #18, respectively, on the US Mainstream Rock chart of 1981. The title song was the first single from the album which was released a month before the album came out. A remastered CD was first released in 1985 on MCA, then again in 1995 on the band's TRC label, and for a third time in 2004 on the band's label TML Entertainment (formerly TRC Records). It is considered their signature record.

== Track listing ==
All tracks written by Rik Emmett, Mike Levine and Gil Moore, except where noted.

No.	Title	Writer(s)	Lead Vocals	Length
1.	"Fool for Your Love"		Moore	4:34
2.	"Magic Power"		Emmett	4:54
3.	"Air Raid"	Levine	(instrumental)	1:18
4.	"Allied Forces"		Moore	5:05
5.	"Hot Time (In This City Tonight)"		Emmett	3:23
6.	"Fight the Good Fight"		Emmett	6:16
7.	"Ordinary Man"		Emmett	7:17
8.	"Petite Etude"	Emmett	(instrumental)	1:15
9.	"Say Goodbye"		Emmett	4:34
Total length:				38:50

== Personnel ==
- Rik Emmett – electric and acoustic (six and twelve string) guitars, bottleneck slide guitar, lap steel guitar, lead and background vocals Oberheim OB-Xa, and Sequential Prophet 5.
- Gil Moore – drums, percussion, lead and background vocals
- Mike Levine – bass, organ, synthesizer, piano, Roland VP 330 Vocoder, MultiMoog
- Elaine Overholt – background vocals

== Production ==
- Dave Dickson – assistant engineer
- Mike Jones – engineer
- Joe Owens – direction
- Nick Sangiamo – photography
- Ed Stone – engineer
- Mark Woods – assistant engineer
- Brian Zick – artwork, illustrations
- Bob Ludwig – mastering on original RCA LP and on the 1985 and 1995 remastered versions
- Brett Zilahi – remastering on 2004 re-issue

== Charts ==
Chart (1981–1982)	Peak position
Australian Albums (Kent Music Report)	93
Canada Top Albums/CDs (RPM)	13
UK Albums (Official Charts)	64
US Billboard 200	23

== Certifications ==
Region	Certification	Certified units/sales
Canada (Music Canada)	Gold	50,000^{^}
United States (RIAA)	Platinum	1,000,000^{^}
^{^} Shipments figures based on certification alone.
