= US Festival =

Music festival

- Genre: Rock, New Wave, Punk, Heavy Metal and Country
- Dates: September 1982, May 1983
- Locations: Glen Helen Regional Park; San Bernardino, California, U.S.
- Coordinates: 34.204°N 117.402°W
- Years active: 2
- Founders: Steve Wozniak, Bill Graham
- Website: woz.org/us-fest/

Location of US Festival in the United States
Location of US Festival in California

The US Festivals were two music and culture festivals held near San Bernardino, California in the early 1980s.

== Background ==
Steve Wozniak, cofounder of Apple and creator of the Apple I and Apple II personal computers, believed that the 1970s were the "Me" generation. He intended the US Festivals, with Bill Graham's participation, to encourage the 1980s to be more community-oriented and combine technology with rock music. The first was held Labor Day weekend in September 1982, and the second less than nine months later, over Memorial Day weekend in May 1983.

Wozniak paid for the construction of a new open-air field venue and an enormous state-of-the-art temporary stage at Glen Helen Regional Park near Devore. This site was later to become home to the Glen Helen Amphitheater. The festival stage has resided at Disneyland in Anaheim since 1985, and has operated under various names and functions as the Videopolis dance club, the Videopolis Theatre, and the Fantasyland Theatre.

== September 1982 ==
The festival ran for three days in early September in 110 °F (43 °C) weather; there were 36 arrests and a reported twelve drug overdoses. One "associated" murder of a hitchhiker occurred the day after the event. The festival lost a reported $12 million, and total attendance for the three days was about 400,000. The price for a three-day ticket was $37.50 (equivalent to $125.11 in 2025).

The festival featured the first use of the U.S.-Soviet Space Bridge, a two-way satellite hookup between the United States and the Soviet Union. Organizers had planned to have the US Festival and Soviet rock fans interact as a way to promote goodwill between the Cold War rivals, but it was too dark in California for cameras to pick up the festivalgoers when the link went live.

=== Performers ===
Bands are listed below in the order they appeared:

=== Friday, September 3 ===
- Gang of Four
- Ramones
- The English Beat
- Oingo Boingo
- The B-52's
- Talking Heads
- The Police

=== Saturday, September 4 ===
- Dave Edmunds
- Eddie Money
- Santana
- The Cars
- The Kinks
- Pat Benatar
- Tom Petty and the Heartbreakers

=== Sunday, September 5 ===
- Grateful Dead
- Jerry Jeff Walker
- Jimmy Buffett and The Coral Reefer Band
- Jackson Browne
- Fleetwood Mac

== May 1983 ==
The 1983 festival ran for three days over Memorial Day weekend, along with an additional day on June 4. Colorado-based promoter Barry Fey replaced Graham as Wozniak's business partner. The weather was slightly cooler than the September festival at 95 °F (35 °C), but the air quality in the region was the worst recorded in four years. The total attendance was reported at 670,000 when all of the days were added together. Van Halen was reportedly paid $1.5 million to perform. The Clash demanded that $100,000 of their $500,000 for the performance be donated to charity before they took the stage for what would be their last show with guitarist Mick Jones before his firing in September. There were two reported deaths. The festival lost an estimated $12 million, as the 1982 festival had..

=== Saturday, May 28 (New Wave Day) ===
- Divinyls
- INXS
- Wall of Voodoo
- Oingo Boingo
- The Beat
- A Flock of Seagulls
- Stray Cats
- Men at Work
- The Clash

=== Sunday, May 29 (Heavy Metal Day) ===
- Quiet Riot
- Mötley Crüe
- Ozzy Osbourne
- Judas Priest
- Triumph
- Scorpions
- Van Halen

=== Monday, May 30 (Rock Day) ===
- Little Steven & The Disciples of Soul
- Quarterflash
- Berlin
- Missing Persons
- U2
- The Pretenders
- Joe Walsh
- Stevie Nicks
- David Bowie

=== Saturday June 4 (Country Day) ===
- The Thrasher Brothers
- Ricky Skaggs
- Hank Williams, Jr.
- Emmylou Harris & The Hot Band
- Alabama
- Waylon Jennings
- Riders in the Sky
- Willie Nelson
- In addition to the listed bands, LA-based band Los Lobos played on a small stage in the tech area on June 4th.

== In popular culture ==
- The festival was parodied in the comic strip Bloom County, when Milo and his friends organize their own version of the "US Festival" as a political fundraiser for their Meadow Party. In this case, the name comes from the fact that the proceeds of the concert will "go to us!", as in the promoters when asked in a fourth wall inquiry. Several well-known groups and musicians make cameo appearances, including actual US Festival headliners Van Halen and The Police, non-performers Culture Club and Barry Manilow, and the fictional heavy metal band Tess Turbo and The Blackheads.
- In 1984, "Weird Al" Yankovic parodied the US Festival (and its heavy financial losses) on an episode of Al TV, claiming that there would be a third edition of the festival, but without any live bands; the entire show would be released only on a cassette tape.
- In The Simpsons episode "Homerpalooza", Homer Simpson refers to the US Festival as the greatest of all time.

== Home video releases ==
In 2003, the band Triumph released a DVD of their US Festival performance, Live at the US Festival. In 2011 Shout! Factory announced plans to release a series of live concert DVDs from the US Festival. The first two of these releases, Willie Nelson and Waylon Jennings, were released on November 15, 2011. The third DVD release from Shout! Factory was Quiet Riot, released on March 27, 2012.

On September 18, 2012, Shout! Factory released The English Beat: Live At The US Festival, '82 & '83 on CD/DVD. On September 9, 2019, it released Santana: Live at US Festival on Blu-Ray and DVD. On September 9, 2020, it released The B52s: Live at US Festival on DVD.

On November 19, 2013, Icon Television Music released The US Festival 1983 Days 1–3 on iTunes. This is the only US Festival release authorized by Steve Wozniak and the Unuson Corporation.

Judas Priest's 30-year anniversary release of Screaming for Vengeance included a DVD with footage of their set from the 1983 festival.

== See also ==
- List of historic rock festivals
