= Triumph (band) =

Canadian rock band

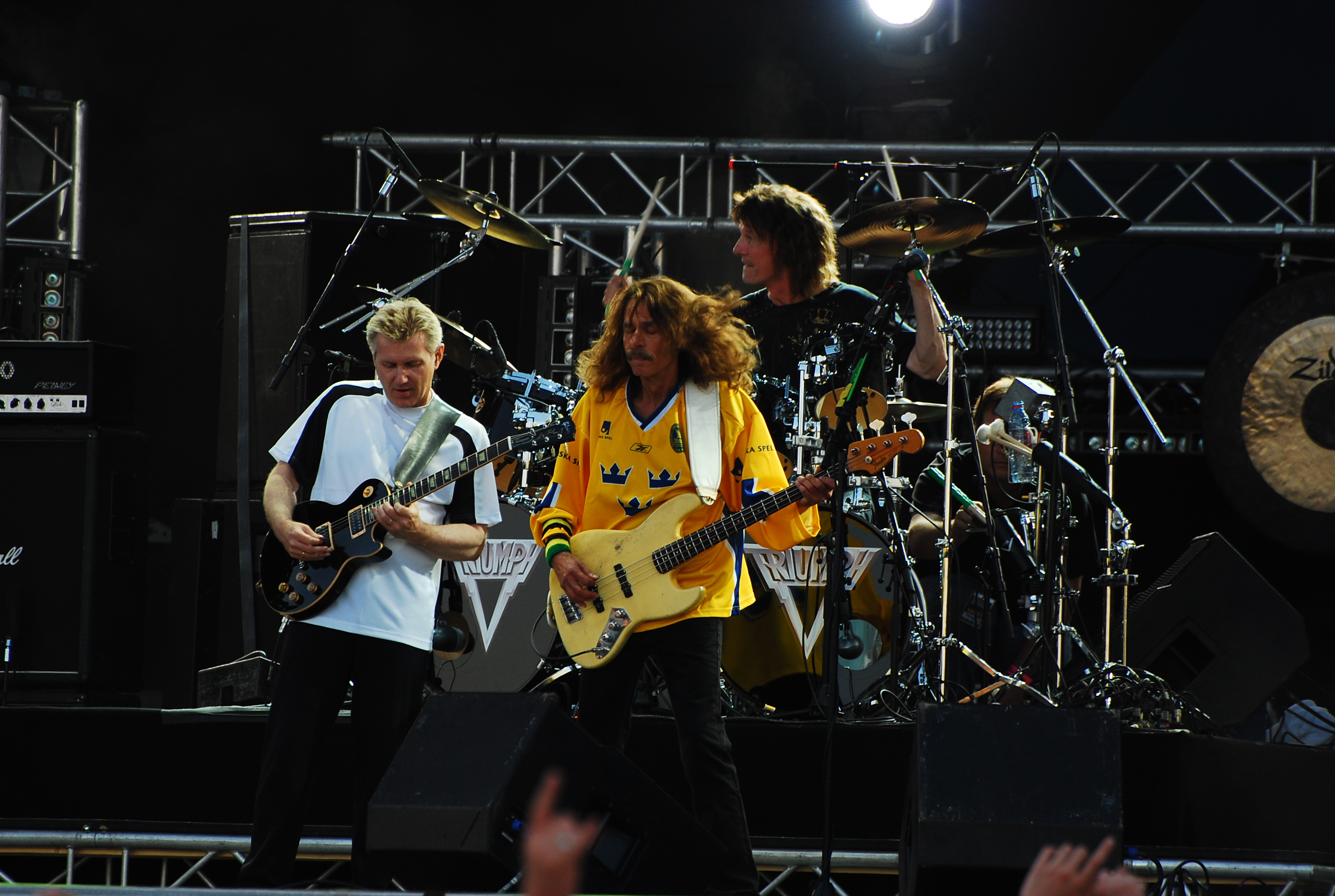
- Triumph's reunion performance in June 2008 at the Sweden Rock Festival

Background information
- Origin: Mississauga, Ontario, Canada
- Genres: Hard rock; heavy metal; progressive rock
- Works: Discography
- Years active: 1975–1993; 2008; 2019; 2025–present
- Labels: Attic; RCA; MCA; TML; Victory
- Members: Mike Levine; Gil Moore; Rik Emmett
- Past members: Rick Santers; Phil X
- Website: triumphmusic.com

Triumph is a Canadian rock band formed in 1975 that was popular during the late 1970s and the 1980s, building on their reputation and success as a live band. Between its 16 albums and DVDs, the band has received 18 gold and nine platinum awards in Canada and the United States. They were nominated for multiple Juno Awards, including the "Group of the Year Award" in 1979, 1985, 1986 and 1987. They were inducted into the Canadian Music Industry Hall of Fame in 2007, the Canadian Music Hall of Fame in 2008 and Canada's Walk of Fame in 2019.

Triumph is most known for its guitar-driven rock songs, such as "Lay It on the Line", "Magic Power", "Fight the Good Fight" and "World of Fantasy", although it originally earned notice for writing strong songs like "Rock & Roll Machine" and "24 Hours A Day". The band was formed in Mississauga, and for much of its existence featured Rik Emmett (guitar, lead/backing vocals), Mike Levine (bass, keyboards, backing vocals) and Gil Moore (drums, lead/backing vocals). This line-up, which recorded the band's first nine studio albums, lasted until 1988, when Emmett left Triumph to pursue a solo career. He was replaced by Phil "X" Xenedis, and Triumph recorded their last album to date, Edge of Excess, with him before going on indefinite hiatus in 1993.

The classic line-up of Moore, Levine and Emmett reunited for two live concerts in 2008, at Sweden Rock Festival and Rocklahoma, and again in 2019 for a three-song performance in Toronto. For the 2025 Stanley Cup Final, Triumph reunited for its first public performance in 17 years in Edmonton, and the band embarked on their first major tour in more than three decades starting in April 2026.

== History ==
=== Early days and first two albums (1975–1978) ===
Before Triumph, there was a four-piece blues-based band consisting of Tom Lafferty (guitar), Peter Young (organ), Mike Levine (bass) and Gil Moore (drums, vocals). This group, called Abernathy Shagnaster (Abernathy Shagnaster's Wash and Wear Band), signed to Canada's Attic Records in 1975 and issued the non-charting single "Hobo" / "Got to Get You Back in My Life". Larry Leishman wrote "Hobo".

Keeler and Young left the group soon after the band's first single was released and in the summer of 1975 Moore and Levine met guitarist Rik Emmett, who was playing at Toronto's Hollywood Tavern in a band called ACT III. After jamming with the pair at Moore's house in Mississauga and reviewing the group's existing contracts, Emmett agreed to join the band, now called Triumph. Triumph's first paid concert with Emmett was at Simcoe High School in September 1975.

Guitarist Emmett's songwriting style brought both progressive rock and classical music influences; most Triumph albums included a classical guitar solo piece. Moore doubled as lead singer on many of the band's heavier songs and in their later years, some softer ballads; bassist and pianist Levine produced their early albums. As with many progressive rock and heavy metal bands, Triumph's style proved unpopular with rock critics; Rolling Stone reviewers labelled them a "faceless band".

Triumph's self-titled first album was originally released in Canada in October 1976. It was later retitled on re-issues as In the Beginning. The second album, Rock & Roll Machine, followed in September 1977 and contained a version of the Joe Walsh song "Rocky Mountain Way". Neither of these original albums were released in the United States, however, RCA Records subsequently released a debut US album in June 1978 also titled Rock & Roll Machine. This album, also released internationally, combines songs from both Canadian releases with new artwork. And "Rocky Mountain Way" received some scattered US airplay.

In February 1978 Triumph subbed in for Sammy Hagar on a radio-station promotion date for 99.5 KISS-FM in San Antonio, Texas, followed by a run of five shows in Texas for JAM Productions (a promoter named Joe A Miller), then toured across Canada with fellow Canadian rockers Moxy and Trooper.

On August 26, 1978 they were headliners at the Canada Jam Festival at Mosport Park in Bowmanville, Ontario, playing before a crowd of about 110,000 people.

=== Mainstream popularity (1979–1985) ===
Triumph's third album, Just a Game (March 1979), featured a moderate US radio hit, "Hold On", which reached No. 38 on the Billboard Hot 100. "Hold On" became a significant song in some select markets; for example, in St. Louis the song made it to No. 1 on KSHE and KWK, album-oriented/classic rock FM radio stations. "Hold On" also peaked at No. 33 on the RPM Singles chart in Canada.

The second single, "Lay It on the Line", received greater acceptance at album-oriented rock FM radio across the U.S. and Canada. It also received heavy FM radio airplay and reached No. 86 on the Billboard Hot 100 in December 1979. In "oldies" classic-rock format radio stations in the US, it remains the most widely played and recognized song from the Triumph catalogue. The album eventually went gold in the US.

In March 1980 the band's fourth album, Progressions of Power, was released and peaked at No. 32 in the US, reaching gold in overall sales. Its single "I Can Survive" peaked at No. 91 on the Hot 100. That year the band performed at the Capitol Theater in Passaic, New Jersey on June 21, 1980; it was their first show in the New York area.

In 1981 their album Allied Forces sold over a million copies in the US, while attaining the highest chart positions any Triumph album would attain; No. 23 in the US and No. 13 in Canada. It included the songs "Fight the Good Fight" and "Magic Power", the latter of which reached no. 5 at Canada's largest Top 40 radio station, CHUM-AM in Toronto. "Magic Power" peaked at No. 14 on the national Canadian RPM Singles chart, their biggest hit in their native Canada. "Magic Power" reached No. 8 on the Billboard Mainstream Top Rock Tracks chart and No. 51 on the Hot 100, while "Fight the Good Fight" went to No. 18 on the Top Rock Tracks chart.

Never Surrender was initially released in December 1982 on Attic Records in Canada, but was not released in the United States until January 1983. The album attained gold status in the US, and peaked at No. 26 on the US album chart. It saw the band's compositions take on more political overtones. Previously, Emmett had included a single political theme on each Triumph album. ("Just a Game", "Hard Road", and "Ordinary Man" portray Rik Emmett's strong populist leanings.) However, Never Surrender featured five anthems. The Jimi Hendrix-inspired riff-rocker "Too Much Thinking" even samples Ronald Reagan from one of his presidential speeches. "All the Way" (No. 2) and "A World of Fantasy" (No. 3) became Triumph's highest ever charting songs on the Top Rock Tracks chart, while the title track peaked at No. 23. The album earned gold record status in the United States (sales of 500,000 units).

However, Triumph's relationship with RCA Records soured at this point; MCA Records executive Irving Azoff co-opted their debts and signed them for five albums. Following their 1984 label change, MCA took over distribution of their old catalogue for ten years. After the shift to MCA, the band began to work with outside producers, and their studio albums became increasingly difficult to replicate onstage. Triumph eventually added Rick Santers, a Toronto guitar and keyboard player, in 1986, to support their last three tours.

Thunder Seven was released in late 1984, initially as a compact disc. But despite two hit singles and videos, "Spellbound" (No. 10 on the Top Rock Tracks chart) and "Follow Your Heart" (No. 13), the album failed to achieve expected levels of sales; cassette and vinyl formats were soon released. On Thunder Seven Emmett's lyrics addressed social concerns in an adult context and Rik Emmett and Gil Moore sang alternating vocal parts in "Follow Your Heart" and "Killing Time". Continuing in the direction of "Never Surrender", the entire second side formed a loose concept focusing on different perspectives of time with "Time Canon" mostly featuring multiple part voice harmonies. Thunder Seven became an RIAA certified gold album in 2003.

In 1985 the band released Stages, a double live set culled from the previous three tours. It also featured two new songs, including "Mind Games", for which a video was filmed but the song failed to chart in either Canada or the U.S.

On June 7, 1985 Triumph was ranked No. 2 in Performance Magazine's 6-week period ending "Tops in Performance" list. That same year the band performed with Mountain as their opening act.

=== The Sport of Kings, Surveillance and split with Rik Emmett (1986–1991) ===
Triumph took a more commercial turn with their 1986 studio album, The Sport of Kings. Rik Emmett's "Somebody's Out There" reached the American Top 40 in late 1986, a significant amount of radio and video exposure. Written and recorded in the eleventh hour of The Sport of Kings sessions, in an attempt to deliver a hit single to satisfy the demands of the record company, "Somebody's Out There" made it to No. 27 on Billboard Hot 100 during October and November 1986. "Somebody's Out There" still stands as the highest-charting song from the Triumph catalogue on the Hot 100. It also reached No. 9 on the Top Rock Tracks chart, although it did less well in Canada, only reaching No. 84 on the singles chart there. Gil Moore's "Tears in the Rain", cut from the same cloth as "Mind Games", did not fare as well in the charts in the US, as it peaked at No. 23 on the Top Rock Tracks charts. The third single, the slow-tempo "Just One Night", which also had a video, did fairly well in Canada, hitting No. 33 on the singles chart in April 1987, but did not chart in the US. Adding the aforementioned Rick Santers to their line-up, Triumph toured with Swedish guitarist Yngwie Malmsteen across the United States in the fall of 1986.

In 1987 the band attempted a return to their usual style with Surveillance. While Gil Moore and Mike Levine remained firmly planted in blues-rock, Rik Emmett took a more modern progressive turn, even involving Dixie Dregs and Kansas guitarist Steve Morse. They collaborated on a dual-guitar solo for Gil Moore's angst-ridden vocal on the Emmett/Santers-penned "Headed for Nowhere". The first single released to radio stations in Canada was "Let the Light Shine on Me", which did well on certain Canadian rock stations, such as reaching number 1 at Q107 in Toronto (as the lead one or two singles on most Triumph albums since 1979 had) while reaching No. 61 on the Canadian singles chart. It did not chart in the US. The first single released to radio stations in the US, "Long Time Gone", reached number 23 on the Top Rock Tracks chart but the song did not chart in Canada. A video was released for the single "Never Say Never", but the song did not chart on the Top Rock Tracks chart or on the Canadian Singles chart.

The 1988 tour, during which the band members experienced growing disharmony over business decisions and artistic direction, ended with a September 3 show on the Kingswood stage at Canada's Wonderland. Later that year Emmett left Triumph and began a solo career; the three did not perform together again for many years. Emmett's first album, Absolutely, yielded four hits in Canada. Meanwhile, Triumph released 1989's Classics as their obligatory fifth album owed to MCA Records.

=== Phil X-era, Edge of Excess and hiatus (1992–2006) ===
In 1992 the remaining members of Triumph recruited Phil Xenidis, a Canadian guitarist known for his work with Aldo Nova and Frozen Ghost. Moore was the principal songwriter and lead singer for 1992's Edge of Excess, with additional help from guitarist-producer Mladen Zarron. Rick Santers also remained on hand as touring guitarist/keyboardist and singer for the 1993 North American tour, singing Rik Emmett's parts in fan favourites "Magic Power" and "Fight the Good Fight". Initial reception of the album from American radio seemed quite favourable, until Triumph's recording label, a subsidiary of Polygram, dissolved unexpectedly in 1993.

But by the end of 1993, the remaining members of Triumph had effectively disbanded, mostly due to their record label's collapse.

In 1998 Rik Emmett resisted overtures from his former bandmates for a potentially lucrative twentieth anniversary US tour, stating he was not interested. Nevertheless, Moore and Levine purchased and acquired back their entire album catalogue from MCA and launched their own label TML Entertainment, and they continued to release live recordings and videos from their long career.

In 2003 TML released a live DVD album called Live at the US Festival originally recorded in San Bernardino, California at the US Festival in May 1983. This historic festival, attracting nearly 250,000 rock fans, also featured Van Halen and the Clash. Triumph had earlier released this concert on VHS following the Never Surrender tour, featuring two videos from the forthcoming Thunder Seven album. And in 2004, TML released a second DVD concert, A Night of Triumph, filmed in January 1987 at Halifax Metro Centre during The Sport of Kings tour. The most comprehensive Triumph anthology, Livin' for the Weekend: Anthology, was issued in 2005. A CD of extended versions of some of the band's most popular hits called Extended Versions: Triumph was released in 2006.

In the 1980s, Moore opened and operated Metalworks Studios in Mississauga, originally for Triumph's exclusive use; more recently the company has been training engineers and sound technicians for Canada's music industry.

=== Reunions with Rik Emmett (2007–present) ===
On March 10, 2007 Triumph was inducted to the Canadian Music Industry Hall of Fame in a ceremony at Toronto's Fairmont Royal York Hotel. All members of the "classic" group line-up (Emmett, Moore, Levine) were present for the event. Although there were no plans for a Triumph reunion, and Moore had taken on a full-time career at Metalworks, the band members didn't rule out future collaborations; Nick Blagona, for example, mastered Emmett's latest hard rock project, Airtime (2007), in the Metalworks mastering suite.

On April 6, 2008 Triumph was inducted into the Canadian Music Hall of Fame as part of the Juno Awards.

In 2008 Triumph's classic line-up performed live for the first time since 1988 with two reunion concerts: the first on June 7 at the Sweden Rock Festival in Solvesborg, Sweden, and the second on July 11 at the Rocklahoma music festival in Pryor, Oklahoma.

In 2011 the band reissued Allied Forces as a vinyl package for their 30th anniversary.

On July 14, 2011 Triumph Lane in Mississauga, ON, was officially dedicated in honour of the band.

On August 28, 2012 the band released a CD+DVD package of their June 7, 2008 reunion concert in Sweden, titled Live at Sweden Rock Festival, on Frontiers Records in Europe and on the TML label in Canada and the United States.

In 2013 Triumph was inducted into Legends Row at the inaugural ceremony held at Mississauga City Hall.

In 2016 Rik Emmett released the album RES9, which included the song "Grand Parade", on which Gil Moore played drums and Mike Levine played bass. The song is a ballad reminiscent of "Suitcase Blues" and even includes the line "Me, I'm hanging out with Johnny Walker once again."

In 2019 Triumph were named Legends Of Live at the 2019 Live Music Industry Awards at Canadian Music Week.

On November 16, 2019 Triumph performed together for the first time in eleven years at an invite-only event at Metalworks Studios in Mississauga, Ontario, where they played three songs — "When the Lights Go Down", "Lay It on the Line", and "Magic Power" — in front of approximately 300 "superfans" in attendance. This Superfan Fantasy performance was taped for the Banger Films documentary Triumph: Rock 'n Roll Machine. That same month, Triumph were inducted into Canada's Walk of Fame. When asked if the band will perform again in the future, Emmett said, "I think we're gonna try and do it every 11 years or so. That's the length of time it had been since we did a reunion in Sweden."

On September 10, 2021 Triumph: Rock & Roll Machine documentary debuted at the Toronto International Film Festival (TIFF). The same month the band was inducted into The Metal Hall of Fame alongside Stryper, legacy members of Kiss and Iron Maiden, and photographer Mark Weiss.

On June 5, 2025 it was announced that Triumph would reunite for its first public performance in seventeen years on the following day, which was held as a free concert ahead of the Edmonton Oilers' second Stanley Cup final game against the Florida Panthers, with The Glorious Sons headlining. Bassist Mike Levine was unable to perform due to a doctor's appointment, and Emmett and Moore were joined by Brent Fitz, Todd Kerns (of Toque and Slash featuring Myles Kennedy and the Conspirators) and former Triumph guitarist Phil X.

On June 6, 2025 Round Hill Music released Magic Power: All-Star Tribute to Triumph, featuring Sebastian Bach, Dee Snider, Joey Belladonna, Lawrence Gowan and many others on a Triumph tribute album.

On December 9, 2025 Triumph (with Emmett and Moore once again joined by Brent Fitz, Phil X and Todd Kerns) announced that they would be embarking on their first North American tour together in more than three decades during the spring and summer of 2026, with April Wine serving as special guests; despite being promoted as a reunion tour for the original lineup, Levine did not appear on the North American leg due to health concerns, though Emmett has stated that he is welcome to participate "if he can claim it". The tour started at Hard Rock Live in Orlando, Florida on April 10, 2026 in conjunction with the Celebration Exotic Car Festival. The concert benefited the Make-a-Wish Foundation.

Derek Sharp (from Gowan) filled in for Phil X on April 28, 2026 at Scotiabank Centre in Halifax, Nova Scotia and on April 29 at Avenir Centre in Moncton, New Brunswick.

In August 2026 it was announced that Triumph (again joined by April Wine) would be extending the 50th anniversary tour into the late fall.

== Philanthropy ==
Since the group's inception, individually and collectively, Triumph have contributed time, energy, music, facilities, equipment and funds in support of a wide range of charitable, educational and humanitarian causes.

Triumph's largest single charitable contribution was its final appearance at Maple Leaf Gardens in Toronto, January 22, 1987. Staged by Gary Slaight for the "Sounds United" campaign of the United Way of Canada, Greater Toronto Division, all proceeds of $179,356.66 were donated. More recently, the trio has raised over $250,000 (and still counting) with its Signed Guitars Program. Since 2009 Triumph has signed over 100 Fender guitars and donated them to various charities for live and silent auctions, raising between $1,500 and $6,500 each. Individually, Emmett has also contributed guitars for Kids With Cancer, CNIB Ride For Sight and Barrett House Aids Hospice.

In 2011 Triumph donated their music and business archives to the University of Toronto Libraries.

Moore, Levine and Emmett have participated, together and separately, in many major fundraising events, including the latter's appearance on "Tears Are Not Enough", the Canadian music industry single for Ethiopian Famine Release in 1985, which would eventually raise over $3.5 million. Moore, along with Tom Cochrane and Rush's Alex Lifeson, and others, served on the committee which spearheaded the tsunami relief effort, Canada for Asia, in 2005.

Other causes Triumph and Metalworks have supported and/or sponsored include: MusiCounts, Rock Star for a Day Program, the Children's Wish Foundation, Canada's Walk of Fame Emerging Artist Program, Canadian Music Week National Songwriting Contests, many High School Battle of the Bands, Full Circle, Camp Rock, Bike for Betty, and Friends of We Care – Easter Seals. The state-of-the-art facilities at Metalworks Studios have also been donated many times to help causes, including the Canadian Live 8 concert, held in Barrie, Ontario on July 2, 2005.

In 1996 Triumph donated royalties from one million units of the song "Magic Power" on the certified Diamond "Oh What a Feeling: A Vital Collection of Canadian Music" compilation CD in support of the Canadian Academy of Recording Arts and Science and Juno Award, as they have done many times in support of charitable initiatives. Moore has participated in and donated Triumph autographed guitars to celebrity golf fundraising tournaments, Levine has bowled for TJ Martell Foundation and Emmett regularly performs at fundraisers for many causes, including AIDS, Food Bank and Shelter benefits.

In 2013 Emmett was awarded the Queen Elizabeth II Diamond Jubilee Medal in 2012 for Community Service and Moore was given a star on the Mississauga Music Walk of Fame for contributions to education and community support. Metalworks Production Group was given the 2014 Sam McCallion Small Business Community Involvement Award by the Mississauga Board of Trade. Metalworks Institute coordinates volunteers for Make Music Matter, a Calgary-based charity (formerly Song For Africa), by going to Africa and sharing their technological and musical training. In May 2015, Moore Received the Mississauga Arts Council, Laurie Pallett Patron of the Arts, MARTY Award for his contributions to the Mississauga arts community. In April 2016, Moore received the Mississauga Board of Trade, Lifetime Achievement Award for his dedication to business in Mississauga and the community.

The group members have also served on various boards over the years. In 2014, Moore joined the Advisory Boards of Music Canada and CAAMA (Canadian Association for the Advancement of Music and the Arts) and Levine serves on the board of directors and advisory board for the Musicians' Rights Organization Canada (MROC). In the past Emmett has served on the Advisory Boards at Humber College and the Songwriters Association of Canada. Moore has also served on the executive board at Canadian Academy of Recording Arts and Science (CARAS) as well as the Toronto Musicians Association (TMA).

On April 10, 2026 the band started its Rock & Roll Machine Reloaded tour in Orlando, Florida, with a concert to benefit the Make-a-Wish Foundation.

== Musical style ==
The band's style is progressive rock, drawing comparisons to fellow Canadian band Rush. AllMusic describes the sound as "high-tech" and "melodic".

== Band members ==
Current members

- Mike Levine – bass, keyboards, synthesizer, piano, backing vocals (1975–1993, 2008, 2019, 2025–present; not touring 2025–present)
- Gil Moore – drums, percussion, lead and backing vocals (1975–1993, 2008, 2019, 2025–present)
- Rik Emmett – guitar, lead and backing vocals, synthesizer, keyboards, bass (1975–1988, 2008, 2019, 2025–present)

Current touring members

- Phil X – guitar, lead and backing vocals (2025–present; full member 1992–1993)
- Todd Kerns – bass, lead and backing vocals (2025–present)
- Brent Fitz – drums, backing vocals, keyboards (2025–present)
- Derek Sharp – guitar, backing and lead vocals (2026)

Abernathy Shagnaster members

- Tom Lafferty – guitar (1975)
- Freddie Keeler – guitar (1975)
- Peter Young – keyboards, organ (1975)
- Abel McKnight – drums, percussion, backing vocals (1975)

Former touring members

- Rick Santers – guitar, keyboards, backing and lead vocals (1984–1993)
- Sebastian Bach – lead vocals (guested with the band on some shows in 1993)
- Dave Dunlop – guitar, backing vocals (2008, 2019)

Session members

- Laurie Delgrande – keyboards on Triumph (1976); on Rock and Roll Machine (1977); on Just a Game (1979)
- Mike Danna – keyboards on Rock and Roll Machine (1977); on Just a Game (1979)
- Beau David – backing vocals on Rock and Roll Machine (1977); on Just a Game (1979)
- Elaine Overholt – backing vocals on Rock and Roll Machine (1977); on Just a Game (1979); on Allied Forces (1981); on "Mind Games" and "Empty Inside" from Stages (1985)
- Gord Waszek – backing vocals on Rock and Roll Machine (1977); on Just a Game (1979)
- Colina Phillips – backing vocals on Rock and Roll Machine (1977); on Just a Game (1979)
- Rosie Levine – backing vocals on Rock and Roll Machine (1977); on Just a Game (1979)
- Lou Pomanti – synthesizer, keyboards, programming on Thunder Seven (1984); synthesizer, synthesizer programming, keyboards on The Sport of Kings (1986)
- Al Rogers – backing vocals on Thunder Seven (1984)
- Sandee Bathgate – backing vocals on Thunder Seven (1984)
- Dave Dickson – backing vocals on Thunder Seven (1984)
- Herb Moore – backing vocals on Thunder Seven (1984)
- Andy Holland – backing vocals on Thunder Seven (1984)
- Gary McCracken – drums on "Mind Games" from Stages (1985)
- Rob Yale – keyboards on "Mind Games" and "Empty Inside" from Stages (1985)
- Michael Boddicker (not to be confused with the major league baseball player Mike Boddicker) – synthesizer, keyboards, synthesizer programming on The Sport of Kings (1986)
- Scott Humphrey – synthesizer, keyboards, synthesizer programming on The Sport of Kings (1986)
- Johnny Rutledge – backing vocals on The Sport of Kings (1986)
- David Blamires – backing vocals on The Sport of Kings (1986)
- Neil Donell – backing vocals on The Sport of Kings (1986)
- John Roberts – newscast on "Carry on the Flame" from Surveillance (1987)
- Steve Morse – electric guitar on "Headed for Nowhere" and acoustic guitar on "All the King's Horses" from Surveillance (1987)
- Dave Traczuk – synthesizer, keyboards, programming on Surveillance (1987)
- Greg Loates – percussion, programming, effects on Surveillance (1987)
- Hugh Cooper – sound effects on Surveillance (1987)
- Joel Feeney – backing vocals on Surveillance (1987)
- Joel Wade – backing vocals, chant, choir, chorus on Surveillance (1987)
- Paul Henderson – backing vocals, chant, choir, chorus on Surveillance (1987)
- Ross Munro – choir, chorus, chant on Surveillance (1987)
- John Alexander – choir, chorus, chant on Surveillance (1987)
- Noel Golden – choir, chorus, chant on Surveillance (1987)
- Mladen Alexander (Mladen Zarron) – guitar on Edge of Excess (1992)
- Lawrence Falcomer – guitar on Edge of Excess (1992)

== Discography ==
- Triumph (1976; reissued on 1995 CD as In the Beginning)
- Rock & Roll Machine (1977)
- Just a Game (1979)
- Progressions of Power (1980)
- Allied Forces (1981)
- Never Surrender (1982)
- Thunder Seven (1984)
- The Sport of Kings (1986)
- Surveillance (1987)
- Edge of Excess (1992)

== Accolades ==
=== Album certifications ===
Date	Album	Certification	Label	Territory
April 1, 1979	Just A Game	Gold	Attic	Canada
May 1, 1979	Rock & Roll Machine	Platinum	Attic	Canada
May 1, 1979	Rock & Roll Machine	Gold	Attic	Canada
November 1, 1979	Just A Game	Platinum	Attic	Canada
November 1, 1979	Triumph	Gold	Attic	Canada
August 1, 1980	Progressions of Power	Gold	Attic	Canada
October 1, 1981	Allied Forces	Gold	Attic	Canada
June 30, 1982	Allied Forces	Gold	RCA	US
September 30, 1983	Never Surrender	Gold	RCA	US
November 19, 1984	Thunder Seven	Gold	TRC	US
March 1, 1985	Thunder Seven	Gold	MCA	Canada
August 26, 1985	Thunder Seven	Platinum	MCA	Canada
December 17, 1985	Stages	Gold	MCA	Canada
October 23, 1986	The Sport of Kings	Gold	MCA	Canada
December 8, 1987	Surveillance	Gold	MCA	Canada
March 16, 2001	Classics	Platinum	MCA	Canada
March 16, 2001	Classics	Gold	MCA	Canada
April 21, 2003	Allied Forces	Platinum	RCA	US
April 21, 2003	Just A Game	Gold	RCA	US
April 29, 2003	Classics	Gold	MCA	US
August 22, 2003	Never Surrender	Gold	MCA	Canada
August 6, 2004	A Night of Triumph	Gold	TML	Canada
December 19, 2007	The Sport of Kings	Platinum	MCA	Canada
February 22, 2013	Rock & Roll Machine	2× Platinum	Attic	Canada

=== Awards ===
Year	Award	Presented By	Location
1979	Juno Award for Group of the Year	JUNO Awards	Nominated
1981	Keys to the City	City of Buffalo	Buffalo, NY
1983	Emissary of the Muses	City of San Antonio	San Antonio, TX
1985	Juno Award for Group of the Year	JUNO Awards	Nominated
1986	Juno Award for Group of the Year	JUNO Awards	Nominated
1987	Juno Award for Group of the Year	JUNO Awards	Nominated
1993	Inductees	Q107 Music Hall of Fame	Toronto, ON
2002	Business & the Arts Award, Gil Moore	Mississauga Board of Trade	Mississauga, ON
2007	Canadian Music Industry Hall of Fame	Canadian Music Week	Toronto, ON
2008	Canadian Music Hall of Fame	JUNO Awards	Calgary, AB
2011	Street Naming - Triumph Lane	City of Mississauga	Mississauga, ON
2012	Music Walk of Fame, Gil Moore	City of Mississauga	Mississauga, ON
2013	Music Walk of Fame, Rik Emmett	City of Mississauga	Mississauga, ON
2013	Legends Row	City of Mississauga	Mississauga, ON
2015	Laurie Pallett Patron of the Arts, Gil Moore	Mississauga Arts Council	Mississauga, ON
2016	Lifetime Achievement, Gil Moore	Mississauga Board of Trade	Mississauga, ON
2019	Legends of Live	Canadian Music Week	Toronto, ON
2019	President's Award, Gil Moore	Heritage Mississauga	Mississauga, ON
2019	Inductees	Canada's Walk of Fame	Toronto, ON
2019	Keys to the City	City of Mississauga	Toronto, ON
2019	Artist Advocate, Gil Moore	Music Canada	Toronto, ON
2021	Inductees	Metal Hall of Fame	Clifton, NJ
2025	King Charles III Coronation Medal, Gil Moore	National Association of Career Colleges	Toronto, ON
2025	2025 Mississauga Citizen of the Year, Gil Moore	Mississauga Civic Awards Reception	Mississauga, ON
2025	Music Walk of Fame, Triumph	City of Mississauga	Mississauga, ON
2025	Icon Award	City of Mississauga	Mississauga, ON
2025	Inductees, Triumph	Canadian Songwriters Hall of Fame	Toronto, ON
2025	Lifetime Achievement Award, Triumph	Toronto Musicians' Association	Toronto, ON
