= Stages (Triumph album) =

Live album by Triumph
- Released: October 14, 1985
- Recorded: 1981–1985
- Genre: Hard rock
- Length: 74:26
- Label: MCA
- Producer: Triumph

Triumph chronology
Thunder Seven (1984)	Stages (1985)	The Sport of Kings (1986)

Professional ratings
Review scores
Source	Rating
Allmusic	link

Stages is a live album by Canadian hard rock band Triumph, released on October 14, 1985, by MCA Records. The tracks were recorded from various performances over the prior three years 1981–1984 although two new studio tracks were added: "Mind Games" and "Empty Inside".

== Original LP and cassette track listing ==
=== Record one ===
Side one

1. "When the Lights Go Down" (Gil Moore, Michael Levine, Rik Emmett) – 6:00
2. "Never Surrender" (Rik Emmett, Michael Levine, Gil Moore) – 6:43
3. "Allied Forces" (Gil Moore, Michael Levine, Rik Emmett) – 5:07
4. "Hold On" (Rik Emmett) – 4:21

Side two

1. "Magic Power" (Rik Emmett, Michael Levine, Gil Moore) – 6:12
2. "Rock & Roll Machine" (Gil Moore) – 10:20
3. "Lay it on the Line" (Rik Emmett) – 5:03

=== Record two ===
Side one

1. "A World of Fantasy" (Rik Emmett, Michael Levine, Gil Moore, Tam Patrick) – 4:18
2. "Druh Mer Selbo" (Gil Moore) – 4:12
3. "Midsummer's Daydream" (Rik Emmett) – 2:42
4. "Spellbound" (Gil Moore, Michael Levine, Rik Emmett) – 3:56
5. "Follow Your Heart" (Gil Moore, Michael Levine, Rik Emmett) – 3:37

Side two

1. "Fight the Good Fight" (Rik Emmett, Michael Levine, Gil Moore) – 7:36
2. "Mind Games" (Gil Moore, Michael Levine, Rik Emmett) – 4:49
3. "Empty Inside" (Rik Emmett, Michael Levine, Gil Moore) – 4:04

== CD track listing ==
1. "When the Lights Go Down" (Gil Moore, Michael Levine, Rik Emmett) – 6:00
2. "Never Surrender" (Rik Emmett, Michael Levine, Gil Moore) – 6:43
3. "Hold On" (Rik Emmett) – 4:21
4. "Magic Power" (Rik Emmett, Michael Levine, Gil Moore) – 6:12
5. "Rock & Roll Machine" (Gil Moore) – 10:20
6. "Lay it on the Line" (Rik Emmett) – 5:03
7. "A World of Fantasy" (Rik Emmett, Michael Levine, Gil Moore, Tam Patrick) – 4:14
  - Remastered CD combines two tracks as "A World of Fantasy (Druh Mer Selbo)" which lasts 8:15
8. "Midsummer's Daydream" (Rik Emmett) – 2:42
9. "Spellbound" (Gil Moore, Michael Levine, Rik Emmett) – 3:56
10. "Follow Your Heart" (Gil Moore, Michael Levine, Rik Emmett) – 3:37
11. "Fight the Good Fight" (Rik Emmett, Michael Levine, Gil Moore) – 7:36
12. "Mind Games" (Gil Moore, Michael Levine, Rik Emmett) – 4:49
13. "Empty Inside" (Rik Emmett, Michael Levine, Gil Moore) – 4:04

== Personnel ==
- Rik Emmett – guitars, vocals
- Gil Moore – drums, percussion, vocals
- Michael Levine – bass, keyboards
- Gary McCracken – drums on "Mind Games" due to Gil Moore's arm injury
- Rob Yale – keyboards

== Production ==
- Ed Stone – mixing
- Hugh Cooper – engineer
- Dave Runstedler – assistant engineer
- Noel Golden – assistant engineer
- Brian Hewson – vocal recording
- Brett Zilahi – digital re–mastering
- Paul Natkin – photography
- Rodney Bowes – photography
- Dimo Safari – photography
- Nick Sangiamo – photography
- Ross Marino – photography
- Bruce Kessler – photography
- Patrick Harbron – photography
- Phil Regendanz – photography
- Raj Rama – album cover photo

== Charts ==
Chart (1985–1986)	Peak position
Canada Top Albums/CDs (RPM)	31
Swedish Albums (Sverigetopplistan)	44
US Billboard 200	50

== Certifications ==
Region	Certification	Certified units/sales
Canada (Music Canada)	Gold	50,000^{^}
^{^} Shipments figures based on certification alone.
