= Mississauga Board of Trade =

The Mississauga Board of Trade (MBOT) is a non-profit organization representing the business interests of 1500 Mississauga corporations.

Founded in 1959 as Toronto Township (Town of Mississauga after 1965) Chamber of Commerce and became board of trade in 1977.
