= TML Entertainment =

TML Entertainment is a record label launched by Canadian rock band Triumph in 2003. It is managed by Triumph's members Gil Moore and Mike Levine.

The label was previously known as TRC from 1995 until 2003. The decision for Triumph to launch their own label came after the band's 10 year/5-album contract with MCA Records expired at the end of 1994. Subsequently, all of Triumph's albums were re-released on the TRC imprint using the 1980s remasters. Then in 2003, TRC changed its name to TML Entertainment with the release of Triumph's live album and DVD Live at the US Festival. Over the last few years, TML has re-released the whole catalog with new remastered versions done in 2004/2005 and the concert DVD A Night with Triumph. Universal Music Group distributes the band's label in Canada and ADA (a small subsidiary of the Warner Music Group) in the US.
