= Gil Moore =

Canadian drummer and vocalist (born 1953)

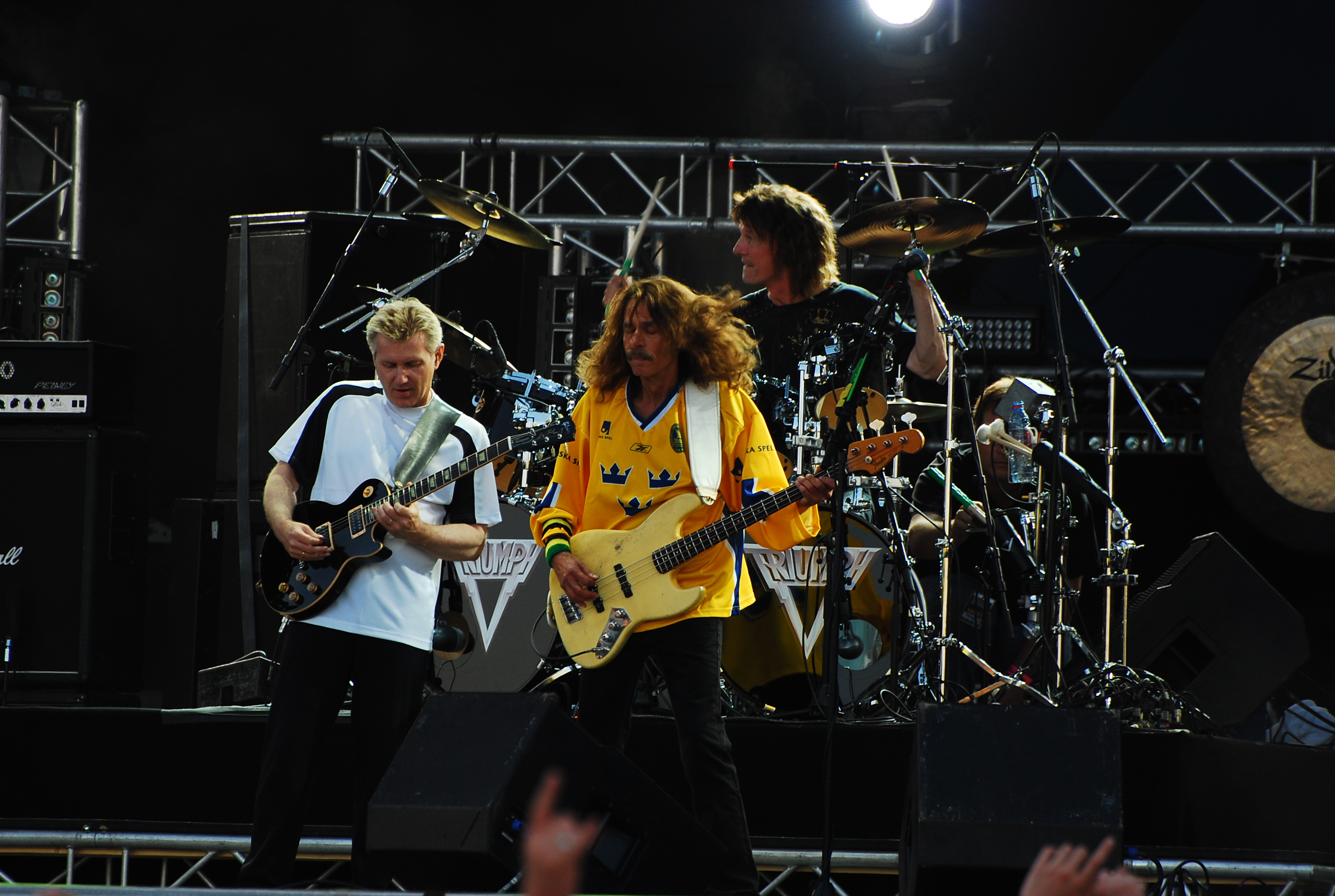

Background information
- Born: February 12, 1953 (age 73); Toronto, Ontario, Canada
- Genres: Hard rock; progressive rock; heavy metal; progressive metal
- Occupations: Musician, songwriter, producer
- Instruments: Drums, percussion, vocals
- Years active: 1975–present
- Label: TML
- Website: triumphmusic.com

Gil Moore (born Feb 12, 1953) is a Canadian musician. Born in Toronto, Moore is the drummer and co-vocalist (sharing vocal duties with guitarist/vocalist Rik Emmett) of the power trio Triumph. Before Moore was in Triumph he was in a band called Sherman & Peabody which also featured Buzz Shearman of Moxy and Greg Godovitz of Goddo.

He co-wrote and contributed lead vocals to a number of Triumph songs and also performed this function live. While Emmett's vocals and songwriting tended toward the more melodic side of Triumph, Moore's vocal and writing style was more blues/hard rock oriented, although on the original line-up's last two albums, Moore also began writing and singing lead on a number of softer, ballad-style songs.

Moore is the owner of Canada's largest recording studio Metalworks Studios, located in Mississauga, Ontario. The studio has been around for over 40 years and has recorded acts such as Drake, Guns N' Roses, the Cranberries, Katy Perry, Black Eyed Peas, Jonas Brothers and many more. Moore works as the CEO of Metalworks Studios, Metalworks Production Group and Metalworks Institute.

== Awards and accolades ==
Year	Award	Presented By	Location
1979	Juno Award for Group of the Year, Triumph	JUNO Awards	Nominated
1981	Keys to the City, Triumph	City of Buffalo	Buffalo, NY
1983	Emissary of the Muses, Triumph	City of San Antonio	San Antonio, TX
1985	Juno Award for Group of the Year, Triumph	JUNO Awards	Nominated
1986	Juno Award for Group of the Year, Triumph	JUNO Awards	Nominated
1987	Juno Award for Group of the Year, Triumph	JUNO Awards	Nominated
1993	Inductees, Triumph	Q107 Music Hall of Fame	Toronto, ON
2002	Business & the Arts Award, Gil Moore	Mississauga Board of Trade	Mississauga, ON
2007	Canadian Music Industry Hall of Fame, Triumph	Canadian Music Week	Toronto, ON
2008	Canadian Music Hall of Fame, Triumph	JUNO Awards	Calgary, AB
2011	Street Naming - Triumph Lane	City of Mississauga	Mississauga, ON
2012	Music Walk of Fame, Gil Moore	City of Mississauga	Mississauga, ON
2013	SME Excellence Award, Metalworks Group	Ontario Chamber of Commerce	Mississauga, ON
2013	Legends Row, Triumph	City of Mississauga	Mississauga, ON
2014	Sam McCallion Community Involvement Award, Metalworks Production Group	Mississauga Board of Trade	Mississauga, ON
2015	Laurie Pallett Patron of the Arts, Gil Moore	Mississauga Arts Council	Mississauga, ON
2016	Music School of the Year, Metalworks Institute	Canadian Music & Broadcast Industry Awards	Toronto, ON
2016	Lifetime Achievement, Gil Moore	Mississauga Board of Trade	Mississauga, ON
2019	Legends of Live, Triumph	Canadian Music Week	Toronto, ON
2019	President's Award, Gil Moore	Heritage Mississauga	Mississauga, ON
2019	Inductees, Triumph	Canada's Walk of Fame	Toronto, ON
2019	Keys to the City, Triumph	City of Mississauga	Mississauga, ON
2019	Music School of the Year, Metalworks Institute	Canadian Music & Broadcast Industry Awards	Toronto, ON
2019	Paul Kitchin Award For Outstanding Community Involvement, Metalworks Institute	Career Colleges Ontario	Toronto, ON
2019	Artist Advocate, Gil Moore	Music Canada	Toronto, ON
2021	Inductees, Triumph	Metal Hall of Fame	Clifton, NJ
2025	King Charles III Coronation Medal, Gil Moore	National Association of Career Colleges	Toronto, ON
2025	2025 Mississauga Citizen of the Year, Gil Moore	Mississauga Civic Awards Reception	Mississauga, ON
2025	Music Walk of Fame, Triumph	City of Mississauga	Mississauga, ON
2025	Icon Award	City of Mississauga	Mississauga, ON
2025	Inductees, Triumph	Canadian Songwriters Hall of Fame	Toronto, ON
2025	Lifetime Achievement Award, Triumph	Toronto Musicians’ Association	Toronto, ON

== See also ==
- Gilmore Girls
