= Mike Levine (musician) =

Canadian musician (born 1949)

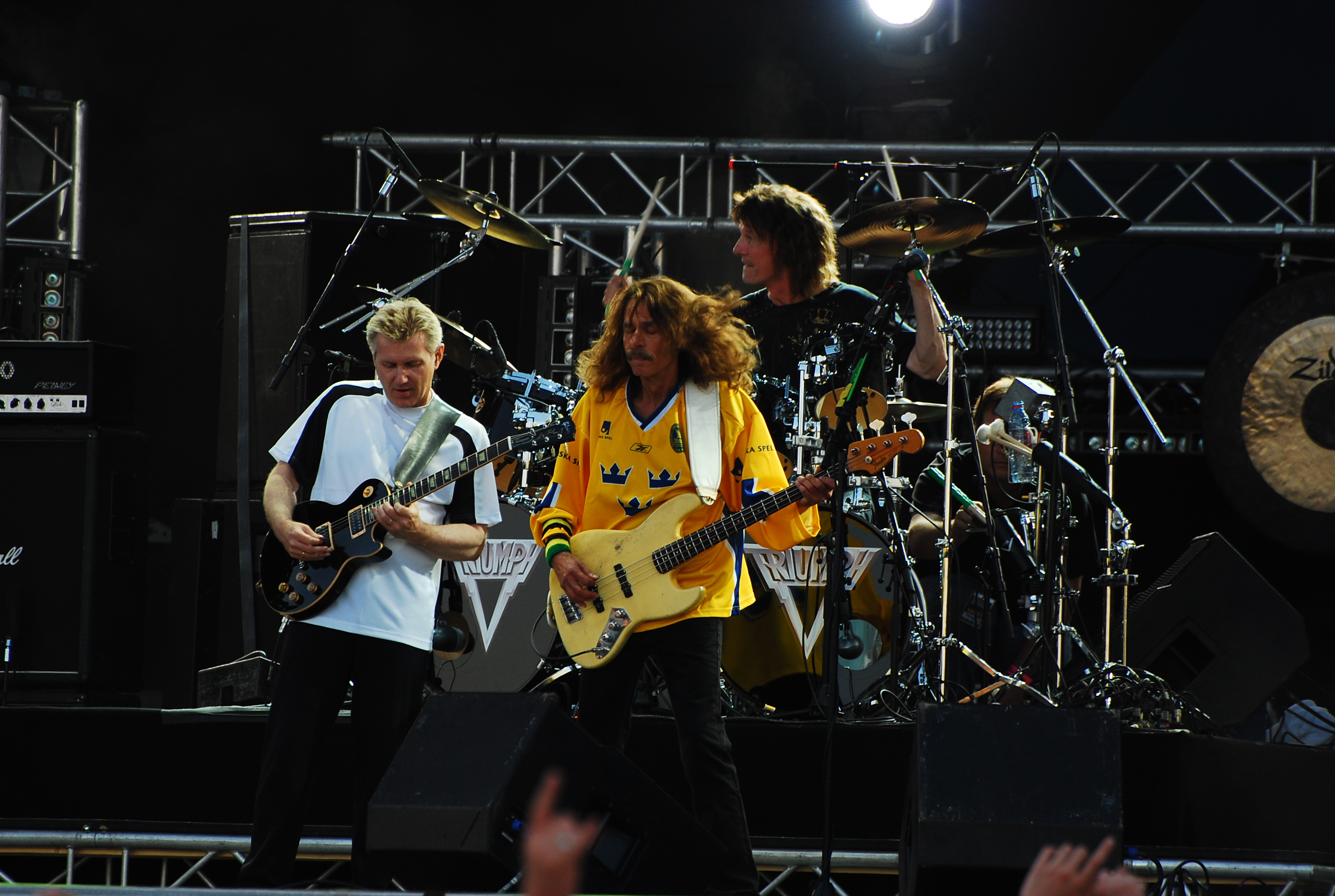
- Levine with Triumph in 2008

Background information
- Born: Michael Stephen Levine; 1 June 1949 (age 77)
- Origin: Toronto, Ontario, Canada
- Genres: Hard rock, progressive rock, heavy metal, progressive metal
- Instruments: Bass, keyboards
- Member of: The Dana, Terry and The Pyrates, Aurora Borealis, Motherlode, Triumph
- Website: triumphmusic.com

Michael Stephen Levine (born 1 June 1949) is a Canadian musician, best known as the bassist and keyboardist for Canadian hard rock band Triumph.

== Early life ==
Levine was born in Toronto, Ontario. He attended Sir John A. Macdonald Collegiate Institute in Scarborough.

== Career ==
During the 1960s, Levine was part of the band The Dana which was made up of lead vocalist Glen Daigle, guitarist Val Rufo, organist Aldur Kundur, himself on bass and drummer Lance Wright. Glen Daigle left the band to attend college and was replaced by Terry Walker who had been backing singer and MC for a group called the Associates. Walker was a more powerful singer. The group recruited a second drummer and horn section and then changed their performing name to Terry & The Pyrates. The signed with Trend Records and released the single, "Keep on Dancin". At some stage the band evolved into Aurora Borealis, a 9-piece musical ensemble. Working with producers, Robert Martin and John Driscoll, they recorded the single, "Smiles and Kisses" / "You", which was released on the Itco Stereo Records label in 1969. Unfortunately Aurora Borealis didn't find any success.

In 1970, Levine helped to bring back together the band Motherlode, which had broken up after releasing one hit single and a couple of less popular recordings. They toured around northern and western Ontario before disbanding once again.

Levine played bass in the Toronto blues band Abernathy Shagnaster's Wash and Wear Band with guitarist Fred Keeler, keyboardists Peter Young and drummer Gil Moore. After the band's first single was recorded, Keeler and Young left; Levine and Moore recruited guitarist Rik Emmett, and the three founded the progressive band Triumph in 1974.

Although he did not sing lead on any of Triumph's music, Levine contributed backing vocals, bass, keyboard work, as well as songwriting. He also produced much of the band's early work, and performed on all of the band's ten studio albums.

Live, he also contributed much onstage banter with the audience, often smoking a large cigar during performances as well as wearing local sports team jerseys (especially NHL teams). On 1 October 1985, responding to a challenge by corporate sponsors, Levine travelled across Canada, visiting eight radio stations from Halifax to Vancouver in one day to promote Triumph's double album Stages.

After Triumph disbanded in 1993 Levine continued to merchandise the band's recordings and songs; he then went into business and began living part-time in Jamaica.

Levine also serves on the board of directors and advisory board for the Musicians' Rights Organization Canada.

Levine was also a contestant on the Christmas Eve 1995 episode of Wheel of Fortune.
