= Rik Emmett discography =

This is a discography for the Canadian rock guitarist Rik Emmett.

== Discography ==
=== Studio albums ===
Release date	Title	Label	Genre
April 11, 1990	Absolutely	MCA	Hard rock
October 10, 1992	Ipso Facto	MCA	Hard rock
1995	The Spiral Notebook	Vanguard	Pop, hard rock
1997	Ten Invitations from the Mistress of Mr. E	Open House	New age
1997	Swing Shift	Open House	Pop, rock
April 20, 1999	Raw Quartet	Open House	Hard rock
1999	Spirit of Christmas (With Sam Reid)	Open House	Christmas
July 2, 2002	Handiwork	EMI	Pop, rock
2002	Peace On Earth (with Sam Reid)	Willow Music	Christmas
December 2, 2003	Good Faith	Rockit	Pop, rock
May 29, 2006	Strung Out Troubadours	Rockit	Pop, rock
2009	Trifecta	P.R.O.	Latin, pop, rock
2016	RES9	Provogue	Pop, rock

=== Live albums ===
Release date	Title	Label	Genre	Notes
October 31, 2000	Live at Berklee	EMI	Pop, rock	
March 13, 2007	Live at the Hugh's Room	Rockit	Pop, rock	

== Video ==
Release date	Title	Label	Notes
2005	One Night in Cinci	Rockit	Filmed live at the 20th Century Theatre in Cincinnati, Ohio, on August 6, 2004
2006	Live at Ten Gigs	Rockit	106 minutes
