= The Music Building =

Music rehearsal facility in New York City

Coordinates: 40°45′18.1″N 73°59′28.5″W

- Type: Private
- Industry: Music production
- Website: musicbuilding.com

The Music Building is a music rehearsal facility at 584 Eighth Avenue in Midtown Manhattan, New York City, United States. It is the largest music rehearsal facility in Manhattan with 69 studios on 12 floors that are leased to musicians. It is located near Times Square and allows 24/7 access for musicians. Notable musicians such as Madonna, Interpol, Billy Idol, and Joey Ramone have been tenants at The Music Building. Numerous recordings have taken place at the Music Building by some of the notable tenants.

== History ==
The Music Building was founded in 1979. There were initially two locations in Queens and Manhattan with Queens having more rap and heavy metal bands and Manhattan having more punk, rock, and pop bands. The Music Building in Manhattan became the focal point for all musicians when the Queens building was destroyed by fire in 1996.

The building is currently filled with graffiti art from various artists who have been tenants or have visited other musicians who were tenants in the building. Musicians have stated that instead of living there, The Music Building is like an apartment building where one can rent a room and play 24/7. In addition to renting space to known musicians, The Music Building rents space to local bands and musicians who are just starting.

== Artists ==
The Music Building has been the home to many famous recording artists. In 1979, Chandra Oppenheim started her recording career here. One of the most famous was Madonna who was a tenant from 1980 to 1984. The Strokes are also former tenants of The Music Building and spent most of 1999 writing and rehearsing material there before making their live debut at the Spiral in 1999 and releasing their first album in 2001. The Music Building was also the home to Dubway Studios until 1992.

Other notable tenants include:

- Nervus Rex
- The Del-Lords
- The Fleshtones
- The dB's with Peter Holsapple and Chris Stamey
- Interpol
- Billy Idol
- Ambulance
- Jeremy & the Harlequins
- Joey Ramone
- The Patti Smith Group with Patti Smith and Lenny Kaye
- Spread Eagle
- Television
- New York Dolls
- The Toys
- They Might Be Giants

== Recordings at The Music Building ==
Band or artist	Album(s) and/or song(s)	Year(s) of recording
Spread Eagle	Subway To The Stars	2019
Jeremy & the Harlequins	Remember This	2018
The Magnetic Fields	Love at the Bottom of the Sea	2012
The Strokes	Angles	2011
Teddy Thompson	Upfront & Down Low	2007
Joseph Arthur	Our Shadows Will Remain	2004
Lili Anel	Hi-Octane Coffee	2001
Spread Eagle	Spread Eagle	1990 (debut album)
They Might Be Giants	(She Was A) Hotel Detective	1988
They Might Be Giants	They Might Be Giants	1986 (also known as "The Pink Album")
