= Left (Monkey House album) =

Studio album by Monkey House
- Released: June 3, 2016
- Genre: Jazz rock
- Label: Alma Records

Monkey House chronology
Retrospective (2013)	Left (2016)

Left is a studio album by the music group Monkey House, released on June 3, 2016, on Alma Records, which is affiliated with the Universal Music Group. It was mainly recorded at the Drive Shed in Toronto. It was co-produced by Don Breithaupt and Peter Cardinali, and the engineer was John 'Beetle' Bailey. After the increased popularity of their previous album from 2012, entitled Headquarters, the leader of the band Don Breithaupt stated that "Part of the buzz for me on this album is that I sense a lot of people [were] waiting for it. I keep getting inquiries from people from all over the world giving me grief for taking so long, but that’s a fun situation to be in." Once again, this release has raised comparisons to the music group Steely Dan. "There's only one comparison really, and that's Steely Dan, and in particular, the Aja-Gaucho period", states jazzcorner.com. The album title Left is derived from the fact that Breithaupt made a big move from Toronto, to the "left coast", or west coast of the United States, setting up a new home in the Los Angeles, California area prior to the production and recording of the album. He states that some of the tunes originated on his long drive across the wide open spaces in North America. The album features contributions from Steely Dan veterans Michael Leonhart, Elliott Randall, Jay Graydon, and Drew Zingg, and includes background vocals from Lucy Woodward (Snarky Puppy), as well as David Blamires (Pat Metheny Group).

The album has had favorable reviews. The music blog Calling Captain Autumn by Andrew Goodwin states "This is glorious, spine-tingling stuff, as close as I’m going to get to hearing a new Steely Dan album, and it fills me with a profound sense of joy.". From Inside MusiCast: "Since 1992, Don Breithaupt has steered his band Monkey House on a path of musical progress...Left contains brilliantly crafted songs that may be the band’s finest collection to date." "In The Hills" magazine calls the album "spectacular in every possible way...Left is Monkey House's best ever". The album debuted at number 9 on the iTunes U.S. Jazz chart, number 2 on the iTunes Canada jazz chart, and peaked at Number 24 on the Billboard Jazz Albums Chart.

== Track listing ==
No.	Title	Writer(s)	Length
1.	"My Top Ten List"	Don Breithaupt	4:44
2.	"When the Kid Comes Home"	Don Breithaupt	3:27
3.	"Good to Live"	Don Breithaupt, Jay Graydon	5:21
4.	"It's Already Dark in New York"	Don Breithaupt	5:57
5.	"Tango by Yourself"	Don Breithaupt	5:24
6.	"Anyone"	Don Breithaupt	5:33
7.	"It Works for Me"	Don Breithaupt	4:36
8.	"Maybe None of This Would Have Happened"	Don Breithaupt, Marc Jordan	4:27
9.	"What Exactly Is It That You Do All Day"	Don Breithaupt, Jeff Breithaupt	5:39
10.	"Death by Improvement"	Don Breithaupt	5:28
11.	"The Art of Starting Over"	Don Breithaupt, Julie Crochetière	5:31
Total length:			56:06

== Personnel ==
Monkey House

- Don Breithaupt – lead vocals, keyboards, background vocals, arranger, & co-producer.
- Mark Kelso – drums
- Justin Abedin – guitars (except where noted), solo guitar on track 6
- Pat Kilbride - bass (except where noted)

Additional personnel

- Peter Cardinali – bass (track 7), co-producer
- Art Avalos – percussion
- Lucy Woodward – background vocals
- David Blamires – background vocals (track 8)
- John Johnson – alto sax (& solo on track 2)
- Perry White – tenor sax
- Verne Dorge – baritone sax
- William Sperandei – trumpet (& solo on tracks 10, 11)
- William Carn - trombone
- Christian Overton - trombone
- Kim Mitchell - solo guitar on track 1
- Jay Graydon - solo guitar on track 3
- Michael Leonhart - solo trumpet on track 4
- Tom Szczesniak - accordion on track 5
- Donny McCaslin - tenor sax on track 5
- Elliott Randall - solo guitar on track 7
- Drew Zingg - solo guitar on track 9
- D. Breithaupt - solo synthesizer on track 8, solo piano on track 10
- Prague Philharmonic Orchestra performs on track 11
