= Retrospective (Monkey House album) =

Compilation album by Monkey House
- Released: 2013
- Genre: Jazz rock
- Label: GDM Records

Monkey House chronology
Headquarters (2012)	Retrospective (2013)	Left (2016)

Retrospective is an anthology album by the music group Monkey House, which was released in 2013 on the Green Dolphin Music label. Monkey House is a rock/pop/jazz group led by Don Breithaupt. This release has a total of 44 tracks: 38 songs, plus six interviews. It includes almost every tune from their first two albums, Welcome to the Club (1992), and True Winter (1998), and also has four newer songs that were on the 2005 release entitled Big Money: Singles Remasters Rarities 1992-2005. Additionally, six tunes not previously released are on this anthology album, five of them being instrumentals, as well as the tune "I'm Not That Guy" from the Headquarters (2012 album) sessions, but had not been included on that album. Special guests include Little Feat drummer Richie Hayward and former Pat Metheny Group member David Blamires.

== Track listing ==
All songs written by Don Breithaupt

No.	Title	Length
1.	"I'm Not That Guy"	4:30
2.	"Road Movie"	4:32
3.	"Tough Love"	3:32
4.	"Wanna Be"	5:03
5.	"True Winter"	5:49
6.	"Welcome to the Club {2005 Remix}"	3:43
7.	"The Difference Between New York and L.A."	4:19
8.	"Maybe I Don't Want to Know"	3:51
9.	"North"	4:46
10.	"Dear Stranger"	4:25
11.	"Just Like Me"	4:31
12.	"Mister Tragic"	3:32
13.	"Big Money"	4:42
14.	"Good Company"	4:02
15.	"Subtitles"	3:13
16.	"Come Out and Dance"	4:22
17.	"Love's Last Stand"	4:28
18.	"We Never Knew Each Other"	4:24
19.	"Across the Border"	4:06
20.	"Blue Boulevard {2005 Remix}"	4:36
21.	"Memory Burns"	4:35
22.	"Predictions for the Year 2000"	5:07
23.	"Big Red Sun"	4:14
24.	"You're Not in Love"	3:36
25.	"Where Love Comes From"	4:12
26.	"Someday (We'll Look Back On This and Laugh)"	4:31
27.	"Someone to See Me Through"	4:51
28.	"Paradise Road"	4:32
29.	"Same Night, Different Music"	4:24
30.	"A Matter of Moments"	4:16
31.	"North (Reprise)"	0:45
32.	"Welcome to the Club {Album Mix}"	3:48
33.	"Blue Boulevard {Album Mix}"	4:42
34.	"Newberry Street"	4:12
35.	"Five Spot"	4:34
36.	"Another Time"	4:00
37.	"21st Century Gothic"	4:12
38.	"Rhodium"	4:10
39.	"Monkey House Interview 1"	5:17
40.	"Monkey House Interview 2"	4:53
41.	"Monkey House Interview 3"	6:53
42.	"Monkey House Interview 4"	5:26
43.	"Monkey House Interview 5"	5:31
44.	"Monkey House Interview 6"	2:53
Total length:		192:00

== Personnel ==
- Don Breithaupt - lead and backup vocals, keyboards, percussion, arranger, producer
- Rich Dodson - producer, guitar
- Mark Kelso – drums on track 1, brushes, hi-hat
- Richie Hayward - drums
- Rick Gratton - drums
- Pat Kilbride - bass on track 1
- Mike Francis - guitar, electric sitar
- John David (Dave) Dunlop - guitar
- Kenny Vehkavaara - guitar
- Asher Horowitz - guitar
- Peter Smith - guitar
- Carlos Lopes - guitar
- Anthony Vanderburgh - guitar
- Kevin Breit - guitar, mandolin, backup vocals
- Burke Carroll - pedal steel guitar
- Perry White – saxophone
- John Johnson – saxophones, EWI
- Tony Carlucci - trumpet
- Dave Dunlop - cornet, trumpet
- Gord Myers - trombone
- Terry Promane - trombone
- Rikki Rumball - backup vocals, lead vocal on tracks 20 & 33
- David Blamires - backup vocals
- Lorraine Lawson - backup vocals
- Debbie Johnson - backup vocals
- Suzanne Zrinscak - backup vocals
- Densil Pinnock - backup vocals, scat & octave vocals on track 24
- Jeff Breithaupt - character voice on track 13
- Aashna - voices
- MC Squared - rap lines on track 13
- Ross Breithaupt - congas
