= Mercury Comet (album) =

Studio album by Smash Mouth
- Released: August 12, 2026
- Recorded: 2024–2026
- Studios: Sound Management Studios, San Jose, California
- Genres: Surf punk; ska punk; punk rock
- Length: 35:42
- Label: Self-released
- Producers: Paul De Lisle; Deegan Mack Adams

Smash Mouth chronology
Missile Toes (2023)	Mercury Comet (2026)

Singles from Mercury Comet
- 1. "Better Believer" Released: June 10, 2026; 2. "Had Enuff" Released: July 15, 2026; 3. "Monsters on My Block" Released: August 3, 2026

Professional ratings
Review scores
Source	Rating
Maxazine	6/10

Mercury Comet is the ninth studio album by American rock band Smash Mouth, released on August 12, 2026. It is the band's second studio album to have Zach Goode on lead vocals. It is also their first original album in 14 years, following 2012's Magic, and the first original album to not feature Steve Harwell on lead vocals, following his retirement in 2021 and death in 2023. The album has been described as a "new chapter" for the band going forward.

== Background ==
Following Zach Goode's arrival in 2021, Smash Mouth returned to recording singles, such as "4th of July," "Underground Sun," and "Ride On;" the latter of which was described as a continuation of the 2001 single "Pacific Coast Party." In December of 2023, the band released the Christmas album, Missile Toes.

On March 12, 2024, the band hinted at returning to the studio to record a new studio LP in the same ska punk style as their 1997 debut, Fush Yu Mang. The album was officially confirmed in early December 2024, under the working title Fush Yu Too. The idea to make it similar to Fush Yu Mang came from their manager, Robert Hayes. In an interview with Vice, bassist Paul De Lisle admitted the production process was "similar to making the first album. We did have a lot of time to make this record, as we did the first one. You know, as they say, you have your whole life to make your first record and six months to make your second." De Lisle revealed in a separate interview that a bunch of the songs came from a backlog of music that former frontman Steve Harwell did not want to record.

Mercury Comet signals a new era for the band, and was described as blending the band's signature pop rock, surf punk, ska and retro sound with "fresh musical directions." De Lisle was the primary songwriter, although every member contributed in some way, noting particularly how singer Goode and keyboardist Michael Klooster "really stepped up." Being the first original LP without Harwell, De Lisle said "Steve was much more of a dictator and wanted things exactly his way. Unfortunately, Steve passed away nearly three years ago, and when I took over I decided I wasn't going to do that with these guys. They're great musicians and creative musicians, so I wanted it to be much more democratic. That's how we’ve done things since."

The album's lead single, "Better Believer," came to be when Harwell challenged De Lisle by saying he wasn't as good of a songwriter as Greg Camp, which De Lisle used as motivation. Goode said the single "Had Enuff" is about "reaching your breaking point and finally deciding you've had enough," while ""Monsters on My Block" reminds us that sometimes the things we're afraid of aren't monsters at all... they're simply people we don't understand." De Lisle said "Had Enuff" "probably has the most Smash Mouth elements in it. It was structured a little bit to be that way. Maybe it's a response to 'Can't Get Enough of You Baby,' maybe not."

When asked about the album cover, De Lisle said "That bird became iconic because it's from a picture I took about ten years ago ... Michael, our keyboard player, might have had a couple of cocktails and been slightly tipsy ... [Michael] started trying to fight the bird. He kept trying to punch it. I got a picture of the bird and decided it should be on our record. It means absolutely nothing. It’s a horrible, ugly album cover."

== Release and promotion ==
The album's name and cover art were formally revealed on March 4, 2025, with a June release initially set. However, the album was delayed indefinitely at an unknown point. A year later, in March of 2026, the album's new date was confirmed to be August 12, with the lead single "Better Believer" releasing on June 10. On July 15, 2026, the second single, "Had Enuff," was released. A third single, "Monsters on My Block," was released on August 3, 2026.

Much like the band's past few releases, Mercury Comet did not chart anywhere; however, unlike those releases, which had charting singles, none of the singles off of Mercury Comet were able to chart.

=== Touring ===
The album was supported throughout 2025, under the "Mercury Comet Tour." Throughout 2026, the band will tour in support of the album again, under the "Go for the Moon Tour."

== Similarity allegations ==
On August 15, 2026, Fountains of Wayne singer Chris Collingwood made a post on Bluesky claiming the song "Monsters on My Block" was a copy of their song "The Valley of Malls."

== Track listing ==
Adapted from Spotify.

All tracks are written by Paul De Lisle, except where noted.

Mercury Comet track listing
No.	Title	Writer(s)	Length
1.	"Better Believer"		3:06
2.	"Whiskey Gin & Wine"		2:37
3.	"Had Enuff"		2:56
4.	"Big Sur Sky"		2:45
5.	"House of the Setting Sun"		3:21
6.	"Monsters on My Block"	Zach Goode	3:05
7.	"New Wave Rodeo"		3:20
8.	"Gimme Gimme"		2:48
9.	"Jackie-O"		2:18
10.	"Soaking Up the Sun"	Michael Klooster; Sean Hurwitz; Randy Cooke	3:18
11.	"Face in the Crowd"		2:37
12.	"Midnight Doctor (Mercury Comet)"		3:25
Total length:			35:42

== Personnel ==
=== Smash Mouth ===
- Zach Goode – lead vocals
- Paul De Lisle – bass guitar, background vocals
- Michael Klooster – keyboards, background vocals
- Sean Hurwitz – guitar, background vocals
- Randy Cooke – drums, background vocals

=== Technical personnel ===
- Paul De Lisle – producer
- Deegan Mack Adams – producer
- Robert Orton – mixing
