= Headquarters (disambiguation) =

Headquarters (HQ) denotes the location where most, if not all, of the important functions of an organization are coordinated.

Headquarters may also refer to:

- Headquarters (The Monkees album), 1967
- Headquarters (Monkey House album), 2012
- Headquarters, Idaho, an unincorporated community in Clearwater County, Idaho
- Headquarters, Kentucky, an unincorporated community in Nicholas County, Kentucky
- Headquarters, Nebraska, a ghost town in the United States
- Headquarters, New Jersey, an unincorporated community in Hunterdon County, New Jersey
- The Headquarters (film), a 1970 Finnish film directed by Matti Kassila
- Headquarters, a fictional main location in Pixar's Inside Out and its sequel

== See also ==
- General headquarters (disambiguation)
- HQ (disambiguation)
- Headquarters Building (disambiguation)
