= Life or Death (Lili Añel album) =

Studio album by Lili Anel
- Released: October 10, 2008
- Recorded: 2001 and 2006
- Genre: Jazz, blues, rock
- Length: 65:33
- Label: ESC Records
- Producer: Lili Anel, Cooke Harvey, J.B. Moore

Professional ratings
Review scores
Source	Rating
Hit Meister	link
MusicLetter	link

Life or Death is American singer-songwriter Lili Añel's fourth release and first international album on the German-based record label, ESC Records.

Lili with her sidekick bassist, Mike Kurman at the Birchmere Alexandria, VA 6/11/09.

== Track listing ==
1. Thin Line – 4:03
2. Nothing In Common – 3:27
3. If – 5:27
4. Lay Down Play Dead – 4:39
5. 2 Much Better – 4:46
6. Life Or Death – 4:24
7. Dream Again – 5:53
8. The Way Out – 3:50
9. Won't You Stay – 4:19
10. Down To Zero – 3:57
11. No Matter What Love – 4:36
12. Between Me – 4:58
13. Over You – 3:47
14. Land On My Feet – 3:48
15. I'm Sorry – 3:30

All compositions by Lili Añel except "Down to Zero" by Joan Armatrading.

== Personnel ==
Musicians

- Lili Añel — Vocals, guitars
- Drew Zingg — electric & acoustic guitars
- Johnny Gale — electric guitars
- Seth Glassman — bass
- Andy Burton — Hammond B3, piano
- Frank Vilardi — drums
- Cooke Harvey — electric & upright bass, keyboards

and string arrangements and textures on "Land On My Feet"

- Dave Bozenhard — guitars
- John DiGiovanni – drums, percussion
- J.B. Moore — piano on "If"
- John Ward — percussion on "If"

Producers

- Tracks 1, 2, 3, 4, 5, 8, 9, 11 produced by J.B. Moore
- Tracks 6, 7, 10, 12, 13, 14, 15 produced by Lili Anel & Cook Harvey

Engineers

- Rick Kerr – tracks1, 2, 3, 4, 5, 8, 9
- Julio Peña – track 11
- Cooke Harvey - Tracks 6, 7, 10, 12, 13, 14, 15
- Tracks 1, 2, 3, 4, 5, 8, 9, 11 mastered by Danny Wyatt
- Tracks 6, 7, 10, 12, 13, 14, 15 mastered by Marc Moss
