= Headquarters Building =

Headquarters Building may refer to:

- Headquarters Building, Chulalongkorn University, Thailand
- Headquarters Building, Keswick Barracks, South Australia
- KSC Headquarters Building, Florida

== See also ==
- Headquarters
  - Headquarters (disambiguation)
