= Handiwork (album) =

Studio album by Rik Emmett
- Released: July 2, 2002
- Recorded: 2002
- Genres: Classical, country, folk
- Length: 42:24
- Labels: EMI, Open House Records
- Producer: Rik Emmett

Rik Emmett chronology
Live at Berklee (2000)	Handiwork (2002)	Good Faith (2003)

Professional ratings
Review scores
Source	Rating
Allmusic	link

Handiwork is the seventh studio album by the Canadian guitarist Rik Emmett, released in 2002. It is the second fully instrumental album recorded by Emmett.

== Track listing ==
No.	Title	Length
1.	"Full Sail"	4:04
2.	"Steady Burn"	4:23
3.	"Two Jigs"	2:16
4.	"The Long Line"	3:50
5.	"Libre Animado"	3:18
6.	"Knuckleball Sandwich"	3:09
7.	"Autumn Turns"	4:59
8.	"All Thumbs"	1:49
9.	"Twilight"	6:52
10.	"Once upon a Time"	3:36
11.	"Another Rainbow (For Pat)"	4:04
Total length:		42:24

== Personnel ==
- Rik Emmett – Guitars, Synthesizers
- Dave Dunlop – Guitars
- Steve Skingley – Acoustic Bass
- Pat Kilbride – Electric Bass
- Randy Cooke – Percussion
- Marty Anderson – Keyboards

== Production ==
- Rik Emmett – producer
- Ed Stone – engineer
- Hugh Cooper – mixing
- Noel Golden – assistant engineer
- George Graves – mastering
- Chris Chapman – Photography
