= Swing Shift =

Swing Shift may refer to:

- The shift between the day and night shifts.
- Swing Shift (album), a 1997 jazz album by Rik Emmett
- Swing Shift (film), a 1984 film by Jonathan Demme
- Swing Shift, a stop motion short film by Mike Jittlov
- "Swing Shift (Soixante Neuf)", a song by Nash the Slash on his album Children of the Night
