= Dream Again (Lili Añel album) =

Studio album by Lili Añel
- Released: January 13, 2007
- Recorded: October 2006 through November 2006 at Quarry Hill Studios, Landenberg, PA
- Genre: Jazz, pop, rock
- Length: 45:20
- Label: Wall-I Records (Self-released)
- Producer: Lili Anel and Cooke Harvey

Dream Again is American singer-songwriter Lili Añel's third studio recording. Released in 2007, this marks the first time Lili is credited as co-producer along with Cooke Harvey. The CD received a favorable review in JazzTimes. Seven of the tracks were compiled, along with eight tracks from her 2001 album Hi-Octane Coffee, and pressed onto a new album entitled Life or Death. It was released throughout Europe and Japan. This resulted in her first international album on a European record label.

== Track listing ==
1. "Try Again" – 3:17
2. "Over You" – 3:47
3. "Between Me" – 4:58
4. "Dream Again" – 5:53
5. "Down To Zero" – 3:57
6. "I'm Sorry" – 3:30
7. "Temporary Amnesia" – 2:50
8. "If" – 5:13
9. "I Pretend" – 3:21
10. "Nothing In Common" – 3:30
11. "It's You Again" – 2:44
12. "If God Had A Wallet" – 3:48
13. "Life Or Death" – 4:24
14. "Land On My Feet" – 3:48

All compositions by Lili Añel except "Down to Zero" by Joan Armatrading.

== Personnel ==
Musicians

- Lili Anel – vocals, guitars
- Cooke Harvey – electric & upright bass, keyboards
- Dave Bozenhard – guitars
- John DiGiovanni – drums, percussion
- String arrangements and textures by Cook Harvey

Engineers

- Cooke Harvey
- Mastered by Marc Moss at Target Studios – Newark, DE
