= Good Faith (Rik Emmett album) =

Studio album by Rik Emmett
- Released: December 2, 2003
- Recorded: 2002–2003
- Genre: Rock, smooth jazz, swing, folk, country
- Length: 43:19
- Label: Rockit Sounds
- Producer: Rik Emmett

Rik Emmett chronology
Handiwork (2002)	Good Faith (2003)	Strung-Out Troubadours (2005)

Professional ratings
Review scores
Source	Rating
AllMusic	link

Good Faith is the eighth studio album by Canadian guitarist Rik Emmett, released in 2003. The album touches on different musical styles including reggae, smooth jazz, swing music, folk, classical music and country music.

== Track listing ==
All tracks are written by Rik Emmett

No.	Title	Length
1.	"Unconditional Love"	2:53
2.	"Butterfly Lullaby"	5:08
3.	"Only a Fool"	3:55
4.	"Wicked Miss"	4:23
5.	"Beacon Street Hotel"	3:04
6.	"Way Back Home"	3:38
7.	"Moment of Truth"	4:54
8.	"Break Away"	3:18
9.	"Ask"	4:22
10.	"Spare Change"	3:41
11.	"True Hearts"	4:03
Total length:		43:19

== Personnel ==
- Rik Emmett – guitars, synthesizers, vocals
- Pat Kilbride - Bass Guitar
- Randy Cooke – percussion
- Marty Anderson – Keyboards, Sax (Alto)
- Phil Poppa - Flute, Sax (Tenor), Soloist
- Ian Thomas - Vocals (Background)
- Kathy Martorino - Vocals (Background), Soprano (Vocal)
- Claudio Vena - Accordion, Viola
- Bob Rice - Trumpet, Flugelhorn, Soloist
- Lorraine Lawson - Vocals (Background), Alto (Vocals)
- Jane Bunnett - Sax (Soprano), Soloist

== Production ==
- Rik Emmett – producer
- Tony Daniels - engineer
- Marty Anderson – engineer
- Marty Anderson – mastering
- Jeanine Leech - Digital Imaging, Jacket Design
- Darko - Photography
- Ian Brown - Photography
