= Headquarters (Monkey House album) =

Studio album by Monkey House
- Released: 2012
- Genre: Jazz rock
- Label: Alma Records

Monkey House chronology
Big Money (2005)	Headquarters (2012)	Retrospective (2013)

Headquarters is a studio album by the music group Monkey House, released in May 2012, on Alma Records, which is affiliated with the Universal Music Group. It was primarily recorded at the Drive Shed in Toronto. It was produced and arranged by Don Breithaupt, and the engineer was John 'Beetle' Bailey. Breithaupt is the founder and leader of Monkey House, who have been recording since 1992. Their previous two albums were Welcome to the Club (1992), and True Winter (1998). In 2005, they released Big Money, a collection of singles, remasters, and rarities. Stylistically, the Headquarters album shows it to be influenced by the music of Steely Dan, with arranged horns and background vocals throughout. Breithaupt says the tunes are "pop songs with too many chords!" Also, some guitar work comes from guest artists Drew Zingg (who is best known for his work with Boz Scaggs and Steely Dan), as well as from Kim Mitchell and Rik Emmett (founder of the band Triumph). Also making contributions on this album are Steely Dan trumpet player and musical director Michael Leonhart, with Julie Crochetière and David Blamires adding backup vocals. Headquarters has generated increasing attention and multi-genre airplay for Monkey House, with a growing international audience.

== Track listing ==
All songs written by Don Breithaupt, except where noted.

No.	Title	Co-Writer	Length
1.	"Checkpoint Charlie"		5:23
2.	"Where's Mantis Evar?"	Jeff Breithaupt	5:33
3.	"Faith in the Middle"		4:36
4.	"Revolver"		4:33
5.	"You on the Brain"		4:03
6.	"The Thinking Man's Me"		4:37
7.	"I Could Do Without the Moonlight"		4:17
8.	"Too Much, Too Much"		4:03
9.	"December Girls"		4:35
10.	"Right About Now"		4:30
11.	"Lebanon"	Marc Jordan	4:30
12.	"The Man You Love To Hate"		5:14
13.	"Emily Einstein"		4:07
14.	"Second Avenue Subway"	Jeff Breithaupt	3:29
Total length:			63:30

== Personnel ==
Monkey House

- Don Breithaupt – lead vocals, keyboards, backup vocals, percussion (tracks 9,10,12), arranger, & producer.
- Mark Kelso – drums
- Pat Kilbride - bass

Additional personnel

- Justin Abedin – guitar (tracks 3,4,5,7)
- Mike Francis - guitar (tracks 1,2,8,10,11,12,13)
- Tony Zorzi - guitar (tracks 6,9)
- Anthony Vanderburgh - guitar and solo (track 13)
- Drew Zingg - solo guitar (track 2)
- Rik Emmett - solo guitar (track 8)
- Kim Mitchell - solo guitar (track 12)
- Michael Leonhart - solo trumpet (track 3)
- Art Avalos – percussion (tracks 1,3,4,5,7,8,12,14)
- Mat Pataki – percussion (track 13)
- Julie Crochetière – backup vocals (tracks 1,3,5,14)
- David Blamires – backup vocals (track 11)
- Rikki Rumball - backup vocals (tracks 4,6,14)
- Jennie Laws - scat vocals (track 9)
- Perry White – tenor sax (solo track 1), soprano sax (solo track 6)
- John Johnson – tenor sax (tracks 1,2,6,7,8,9,10,12,13,14)
- Colleen Allen - tenor sax (track 9)
- Andy Ballantyne - alto sax (tracks 1,2,6,7,8,9,10,12,13,14)
- Verne Dorge – baritone sax (tracks 1,2,6,7,8,9,10,12,13,14)
- William Sperandei – trumpet (track 3),(solo on tracks 5,11)
- Dave Dunlop - trumpet (tracks 1,2,6,7,8,9,10,12,13,14)
- Tony Carlucci - trumpet (track 13)
- Gord Myers - trombone (tracks 1,2,6,7,8,9,10,12,13,14)
- Doug Gibson - trombone (tracks 9,10,12), trombone & bass trombone (tracks 1,2,6,7,8,13,14), bass trombone (track 5)
- Mark Mosca - steel pans (tracks 7,14)
- Sheldon Moore - turntables (tracks 3,5)
