= Zach Goode =

American musician (born 1970)

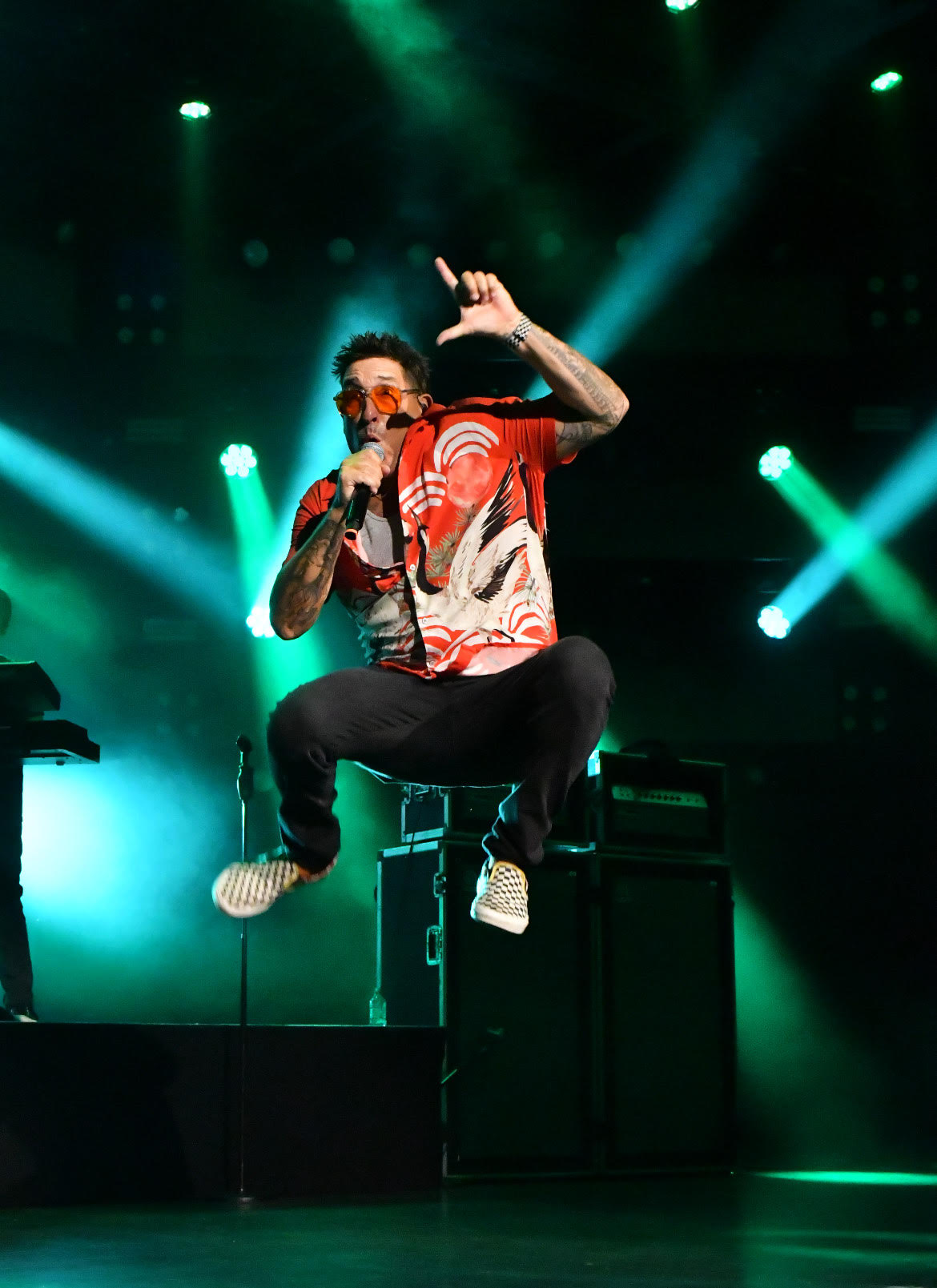
- Zach Goode performing with Smash Mouth in 2025

Background information
- Born: Zachary Spencer Goode; April 9, 1970 (age 56); New York City, New York, U.S.
- Genres: Alternative rock; pop rock; power pop; reggae; punk rock
- Occupations: Musician; singer; songwriter; voice actor; disc jockey
- Years active: 1989–present
- Labels: UM^{ɵ}; Squish Moth; Warner-Tamerlane; Cleopatra
- Member of: Smash Mouth; Geezer
- Formerly of: Ghoulspoon; Divided by Zero; The Secret Seven
- Website: www.zachgoode.com

Zachary Spencer Goode (born April 9, 1970) is an American singer, songwriter, and voice actor who is known as the current lead singer for Smash Mouth. He is based in Los Angeles, California.

== Career ==
Goode was born in New York City, New York, on April 9, 1970, and spent most of his childhood in Provincetown, Massachusetts. At the age of 16, Goode left home to sing in rock bands while putting himself through high school. Eventually, he settled in San Diego, California, where he fronted several bands, including Ghoulspoon, Divided by Zero, and Secret Seven. During his time in these bands, he performed hundreds of shows alongside acts such as Foo Fighters, Blink-182, No Doubt, Deftones, Korn, Sugar Ray, Incubus, Slayer, and Sublime, and released seven albums of original music.

In the 2010s, Goode played and rapped in the mock-senior citizen performance art band Geezer, covered vocals for yacht rock band the Windbreakers, and sang lead in a theater production for the 50th anniversary of The Beatles' Abbey Road. Goode also works as a voice actor in Los Angeles, most notably as the voice of the national Taco Bell "Party Packs" television ad campaign.

=== Smash Mouth ===
On March 1, 2022, Goode was announced as the new lead singer for the multi-platinum band Smash Mouth. The official announcement was made on Kevan Kenney's Audacy show live on KROQ, where bassist Paul De Lisle introduced Goode as the new frontman of the group. De Lisle expressed enthusiasm about Goode joining the band, noting his diverse background from Brooklyn, Provincetown, New York City, and Los Angeles.

Following Goode's introduction, Smash Mouth released a cover of Rick Astley's 1987 hit "Never Gonna Give You Up".

Since Goode has joined the band, Smash Mouth have released a total of seven singles and a full-length Christmas album titled Missile Toes. They have toured across the US for four summers, with major festival stops in Mexico, Canada, Chile, Malaysia, and Peru along the way.

On April 28, 2026, comedian Tom Scharpling announced on his podcast The Best Show with Tom Scharpling his intent to replace Goode as lead singer of Smash Mouth. On August 18, 2026, Goode confronted Scharpling live on The Best Show about the gig, and humorously referred to 2026 as his "final" year in Smash Mouth.

== Discography ==
=== With Ghoulspoon ===
- To Serve Man (1993)
- Medication (1996)
- Fever (1999)

=== With Divided by Zero ===
- The Black Sea (2006)

=== With The Secret Seven ===
- Turn Your Back to the Sea (2010)
- How to Imitate Thunder (2013)

=== With Smash Mouth ===
- Missile Toes (2023)
- Mercury Comet (2026)

==== Singles ====
- "Never Gonna Give You Up" (2022)
- "4th of July" (2022)
- "Underground Sun" (2023)
- "Money" (w/ Chad Tepper) (2023)
- "Ride On" (2024)
- "Sunshine Day" (ft. Barry Williams) (2024)
- "Love Me Do" (2024)
- "Blinding Lights" (2025)
- "Better Believer" (2026)
- "Had Enuff" (2026)
- "Monsters on My Block" (2026)
