= Sean Hurwitz =

American musician (born 1979)

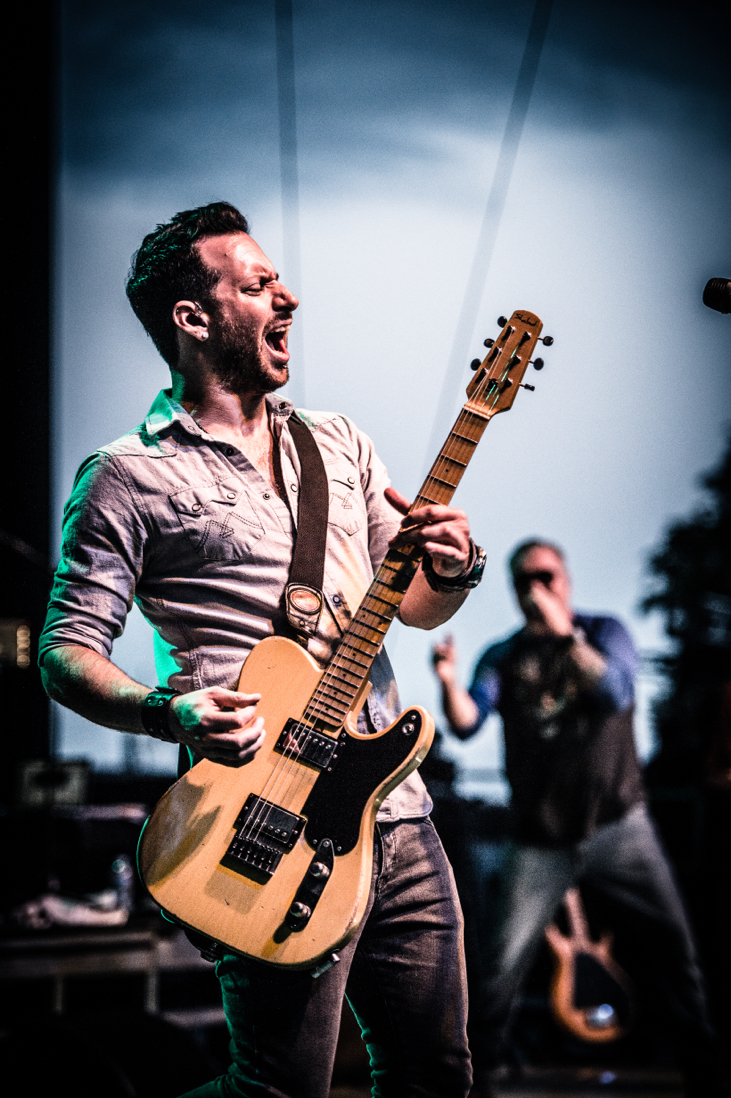
- Sean Hurwitz performing live with Smash Mouth in Woodinville, Washington

Background information
- Born: Shachar Hurwitz; 1979 (age 46–47); Rehovot, Israel
- Occupations: Musician; songwriter; producer
- Instruments: Guitar; bass; ukulele; vocals; keyboard
- Member of: Smash Mouth
- Website: seanhurwitz.com

Sean Hurwitz (born Shachar Hurwitz [Hebrew: שחר הורביץ], 1979) is an Israeli-born American musician known as the guitarist of Smash Mouth (2011–2012, 2012–2016, 2019–present) and Enrique Iglesias. He is also a producer, singer, and songwriter based in Los Angeles, United States.

== Early life ==
Hurwitz was born in 1979 in Rehovot, Israel, to American parents Ira and Dr. Judy Lieman-Hurwitz. He began playing the piano at age 7, and took interest in playing the guitar after seeing the instrument being played in the film Back To The Future. Hurwitz claims that, at the time, he was inspired by Israeli artists such as Gidi Gov and Mashina, as well as British artists such as Eric Clapton and Pink Floyd. His parents bought him his first guitar soon afterwards.

Over the ensuing years, Hurwitz continued to teach himself guitar, while learning how to produce live shows. By age 21, he was audio engineer and stage tech in Israel. At age 23, after a terrorist attack in Israel affected him personally, he moved to Los Angeles to be a professional musician.

== Los Angeles career ==
While living in Los Angeles, Hurwitz met drummer Randy Cooke, who helped him get his first signed artist gig with singer-songwriter Anna Nalick. Hurwitz then joined Nalick on the road while she promoted her second studio album Shine. He later worked with Enrique Iglesias, Smash Mouth, Gin Blossoms, Chris Wallace, and many more. In addition to being a live musician, Hurwitz has also written, produced and recorded music.
