= Muppets Most Wanted (soundtrack) =

Soundtrack of the movie Muppets Most Wanted

Muppets Most Wanted (Original Motion Picture Soundtrack)

Soundtrack album by Various artists
- Released: March 18, 2014
- Recorded: 2013
- Studio: Air Lyndhurst Studios
- Genres: Musical theatre, popular music
- Length: 51:36
- Label: Walt Disney
- Producers: Kaylin Frank, Mitchell Leib, Bret McKenzie

The Muppets chronology
The Muppets: Original Soundtrack (2011)	Muppets Most Wanted (Original Motion Picture Soundtrack) (2014)	The Muppets Mayhem (2023)

Professional ratings
Review scores
Source	Rating
AllMusic	3.5/5 stars
Empire	3/5 stars

Muppets Most Wanted: An Original Walt Disney Records Soundtrack is a soundtrack album released by Walt Disney Records on March 18, 2014, for the musical comedy film Muppets Most Wanted. The soundtrack features six original songs, two re-recordings of popular Muppet songs ("The Muppet Show Theme" and "Together Again"), three cover versions of existing songs (Allen Toussaint's "Working in the Coal Mine", Maroon 5 and Christina Aguilera's "Moves Like Jagger", and Los del Río's "Macarena (Bayside Boys Mix)"), an orchestral suite by Christophe Beck, five demos by Bret McKenzie, and eight dialogue tracks.

Songs not included in the album, but featured in the film include "Long Train Runnin'" by The Doobie Brothers, "End of the Road" by Boyz II Men and Marvin Hamlisch's "I Hope I Get It" (from A Chorus Line).

== Overview ==
In November 2012, it was announced that Bret McKenzie would be returning to write songs for Muppets Most Wanted following the success of its 2011 predecessor, The Muppets. As opposed to the previous film, McKenzie wrote all of the original songs for Muppets Most Wanted; his songwriting influences for the film include the Sherman Brothers, Irving Berlin, Paul Williams, and Harry Nilsson. With song ideas originating from short descriptions in the film's screenplay, McKenzie developed numerous songs and performed demo versions of each by doing impressions of various Muppets. "I'm usually just on piano, with me singing and doing my now quite extensive catalog of Muppet impressions," said McKenzie. "I play a rough version then we get together and work out the best. James [Bobin] often has an idea that's visual that he needs to change the lyric to suit the visual and then we record it with the Muppets."

A music video of McKenzie performing "I'll Get You What You Want (Cockatoo in Malibu)" was released on March 19, 2014, on Funny or Die.

== Track listing ==
No.	Title	Writer(s)	Artist(s)	Length
1.	"They've Ordered a Sequel" (Dialogue)		Walter and Statler and Waldorf	0:13
2.	"We're Doing a Sequel"	Bret McKenzie	The Muppets with Lady Gaga and Tony Bennett	4:16
3.	"My Name First, Your Name" (Dialogue)		Constantine and Ricky Gervais	0:20
4.	"I'm Number One"	McKenzie	Constantine and Ricky Gervais	2:29
5.	"The Casa Grande" (Dialogue)		Kermit, Tina Fey, Jemaine Clement, Danny Trejo, and Ray Liotta	0:13
6.	"The Big House"	McKenzie	Tina Fey and Josh Groban	2:24
7.	"Stick with Me" (Dialogue)		Constantine and Miss Piggy	0:09
8.	"I'll Get You What You Want (Cockatoo in Malibu)"	McKenzie	Constantine	2:46
9.	"The Muppet Show Theme (Spanish Version)"	Sam Pottle, Jim Henson	Los Muppets	1:09
10.	"Answer Some Questions" (Dialogue)		Ty Burrell	0:07
11.	"Interrogation Song"	McKenzie, Paul Roemen	Ty Burrell, Sam Eagle, and The Muppets	3:20
12.	"Oh Foo Foo, It's Always Been a Fight" (Dialogue)		Miss Piggy and Foo Foo	0:08
13.	"Something So Right"	McKenzie	Miss Piggy, Kermit, Celine Dion, and The Muppets	3:11
14.	"We're Goin' Underground" (Dialogue)		Kermit	0:04
15.	"Working in the Coal Mine"	Allen Toussaint	Jemaine Clement	1:56
16.	"The Gulag Finale" (Dialogue)		Kermit	0:06
17.	"Together Again"	Jeff Moss	The Muppets and Josh Groban	2:09
18.	"Moves Like Jagger" (featuring Pepe the King Prawn)	Adam Levine, Benny Blanco, Ammar Malik, Shellback	Scooter and The Penguins	3:28
19.	"Macarena (Bayside Boys Remix)"	Antonio Romero, Rafael Ruiz, Labou Lutz	Miss Piggy, Manolo Flamingo, and Carlo Flamingo	2:38
20.	"Muppets Most Wanted Score Suite"	Christophe Beck	Christophe Beck	3:19
21.	"We're Doing a Sequel (Demo)"	McKenzie	Bret McKenzie	4:32
22.	"The Big House (Demo)"	McKenzie	Bret McKenzie	2:23
23.	"What You Want (Outtake)"	McKenzie	Bret McKenzie	2:31
24.	"I'll Get You What You Want (Cockatoo in Malibu) (Demo)"	McKenzie	Bret McKenzie	2:32
25.	"Something So Right (Demo)"	McKenzie	Bret McKenzie	4:09
Total length:				51:36

iTunes Europe bonus tracks
No.	Title	Writer(s)	Artist(s)	Length
26.	"My Heart Will Go On"	James Horner, Will Jennings	Miss Piggy (Eric Jacobson)	3:05
27.	"The Muppet Show Theme (German Version)"	Sam Pottle, Jim Henson	Die Muppets	1:00
Total length:				55:41

=== Personnel ===
Credits adopted from AllMusic:

Muppet performers

- Steve Whitmire – Kermit the Frog, Beaker, Statler, Rizzo the Rat, Link Hogthrob, Lips, Foo-Foo
- Eric Jacobson – Miss Piggy, Fozzie Bear, Sam Eagle, Animal
- Dave Goelz – The Great Gonzo, Dr. Bunsen Honeydew, Zoot, Waldorf
- Bill Barretta – Rowlf the Dog, Pepé the King Prawn, Dr. Teeth, The Swedish Chef, Carlo Flamingo
- David Rudman – Scooter, Janice, Bobby Benson
- Matt Vogel – Constantine, Floyd Pepper, Lew Zealand, Camilla the Chicken
- Peter Linz – Walter, Manolo Flamingo

Production

- Christophe Beck – composer
- Bret McKenzie – composer, producer, music supervisor
- Tim Davies – conductor
- Kaylin Frank – producer
- Mitchell Leib – producer, executive in charge of music
- James Bobin – executive producer
- David Hoberman – executive producer
- Todd Lieberman – executive producer
- Peter Rotter – orchestra contractor
- Jasper Randall – choir contractor

Orchestration

- Tim Davies – score coordinator
- Dave Metzger – score orchestration
- Chris Caswell – orchestration
- Zach Robinson – arranger, orchestration
- Doug Walter – orchestration
- Joanne Kane – music preparation
- Booker White – music preparation

Technical

- David Bianco – engineer, vocal engineer
- Satoshi Noguchi – engineer, mixing
- Rick Ruggieri – engineer, mixing
- Casey Stone – engineer, mixing
- Nick Wollage – engineer, vocal engineer
- Francois LaLonde – vocal engineer
- Rich Spillberg – vocal engineer
- John VanNest – vocal engineer
- Mickey Petralia – mixing
- Patricia Sullivan – mastering
- Richard Ford – score editor
- Brett Pierce – music editor
- Lisa Jaime – supervising music editor

Art

- Steve Gerdes – art direction, design
- Steve Sterling – art direction, design

=== Charts ===
Chart (2014)	Peak position
US Billboard Top Soundtracks	4
US Billboard 200	68

== Muppets Most Wanted: Original Score ==
Muppets Most Wanted (Original Score)

Film score by Christophe Beck
- Released: April 15, 2014
- Recorded: 2013
- Studios: Sony Scoring Stage, Culver City, California
- Label: Walt Disney / Intrada
- Producer: Mitchell Leib

Christophe Beck chronology
Endless Love (2014)	Muppets Most Wanted (Original Score) (2014)	Edge of Tomorrow (2014)

Christophe Beck was officially announced to score the film in August 2013. The score was recorded during the latter half of 2013 at the Sony Scoring Stage in Culver City, California. With the use of an 82-piece ensemble of the Hollywood Studio Symphony, Beck drew his inspiration from various cross-cultural styles. "With characters spread across the world," said Beck, "there was opportunity after opportunity to explore many musical styles and settings."

A separate album entirely containing Beck's score was released by Walt Disney Records and Intrada Records on April 15, 2014. The album features music from both Muppets Most Wanted and The Muppets, also scored by Beck.

All tracks are written by Christophe Beck.

No.	Title	Length
1.	"The World's Most Dangerous Frog"	1:43
2.	"Let's Do It"	1:01
3.	"Hole In The Wall Club"	0:34
4.	"Dominic Badguy"	1:17
5.	"Froggy Canal"	3:02
6.	"Sam Meets Jean"	0:35
7.	"Secret Lemon Juice Writing"	1:11
8.	"Back at the Gulag"	1:58
9.	"Colonel Blood's Key"	0:52
10.	"Travel by Map"	1:43
11.	"Goodnight Danny Trejo"	1:12
12.	"Following Dominic"	1:23
13.	"Discovered"	1:40
14.	"My Amphibian Prince"	0:21
15.	"You Complete Me"	0:49
16.	"The Proposal"	0:52
17.	"Without Kermit"	0:39
18.	"No One Noticed"	1:33
19.	"Babies"	1:05
20.	"Wedding Interruptus"	1:27
21.	"What an Action Sequence!"	3:46
22.	"Piggy Smooch"	0:38
23.	"We're Sorry Kermit"	2:51
24.	"End Credits"	2:18
