= John Bailey (producer) =

Canadian freelance recording engineer

- Origin: Canada
- Occupation: Recording engineer
- Website: www.johnbeetlebailey.com

John 'Beetle' Bailey is a Canadian freelance recording engineer, mixer, and producer. He has worked with such musicians as The Headstones, Tom Cochrane, Haywire, Triumph, Love Inc. Serena Ryder, Molly Johnson, Sultans of String and Monkey House: {two albums: Headquarters (2012) & Left (2016)} and Alex Cuba.

== List of award nominations ==
=== Juno Awards ===
John 'Beetle' Bailey has been nominated eight times for the Juno Award for Recording Engineer of the Year, and has earned two wins.

2007 - nominated for, and won, the Juno Award for Recording Engineer of the Year, for his work on two songs: "Rain" by Molly Johnson from the album Messin' Around and "Sisters Of Mercy" by Serena Ryder from the album If Your Memory Serves You Well.

2008 - nominated for "Something In The Air Between Us" by Sophie Milman from the album Make Someone Happy and "I'm On Fire" by Harry Manx and Kevin Breit."

2009 - nominated for the songs "Lucky" and "If I Were A Bell" by Molly Johnson from the album Lucky.

2010 - nominated for "I Can't Make You Love Me" by Sophie Milman from the album Take Love Easy and "Havana City" by Hilario Duran Trio

2015 - nominated for "Any Day Now" by The Breithaupt Brothers from the album Just Passing Through: The Breithaupt Brothers Songbook, Vol. II, and "Fine and Mellow" by Molly Johnson from her album Because of Billie.

2020 - nominated for, and won, The Juno Award for Recording Engineer of the Year, for his work on two songs: "Dividido" by Alex Cuba from the album Sublime; and "Shotgun" by Monkey House from the album Friday.

2021 - nominated for "The End Of The Love Affair" by Micah Barnes from the album Vegas Breeze; and "The Grand Bazaar (featuring Bela Fleck and Robi Botos)" from the album REFUGE by Sultans Of String.

2022 - nominated for "Maybe This Year" by Molly Johnson from the album It's A Snow Globe World; and "Mi Santuario" by Sultans Of String from the album Sanctuary.

==== Canadian Folk Music Awards ====
2018 - Canadian Folk Music Awards, nominated for Producer of the Year with co-producer Chris McKhool for the album Christmas Caravan by Sultans Of String.

2021 - Canadian Folk Music Awards, won Producer of the Year with co-producer Chris McKhool for the album REFUGE by Sultans Of String.

2023 - Canadian Folk Music Awards, won Producer of the Year with co-producer Chris McKhool for the album SANCTUARY by Sultans Of String.

===== Latin Grammy Awards =====
2020 - Nomination - Best Engineered Album - SUBLIME by Alex Cuba - John "Beetle" Bailey, engineer; John "Beetle" Bailey, mixer; Harry Hess, mastering engineer

Grammy Award

2021 - Mixer, Best Latin Pop Album, MENDÓ by Alex Cuba
