= Ten Invitations =

Ten Invitations from the Mistress of Mr. E

Studio album by Rik Emmett
- Released: May 2, 1997
- Recorded: 1997
- Genres: Classical, flamenco, folk
- Length: 45:13
- Label: Open House
- Producers: Rik Emmett & Andrew Craig

Rik Emmett chronology
The Spiral Notebook (1995)	Ten Invitations from the Mistress of Mr. E (1997)	Swing Shift (1999)

Professional ratings
Review scores
Source	Rating
AllMusic	5/5 stars

Ten Invitations from the Mistress of Mr. E is the fourth studio album by the Canadian guitarist Rik Emmett, released in 1997. It is the first installment in a guitar trilogy, otherwise known as the Open House Collection released merely six months before Swing Shift, which is meant to cover the basis of Rik Emmett's guitar teaching.

Unlike the next two albums in the trilogy, the album is instrumental. Shannon Emmett, Rik's oldest daughter, plays the synthesizer on the two part suite "Ascending in St. Anne's" and "Secret Wishes". She was only fourteen at the time.

== Track listing ==
All tracks are written by Rik Emmett.

No.	Title	Length
1.	"El Cuento del Gadjo"	7:07
2.	"The Castle of Regret"	3:17
3.	"Angelina's Smile"	3:19
4.	"Buggy Ride"	3:28
5.	"A Whisper Away"	4:01
6.	"Ascending in St. Anne's"	1:25
7.	"Secret Wishes"	3:28
8.	"Acadian Dance"	2:52
9.	"Souveniers"	4:09
10.	"The Seventh Circle"	2:07
Total length:		45:13

== Personnel ==
- Rik Emmett – guitars, synthesizers, vocals
- Steve Skingley - Bass
- Denton Young - Drums
- Randy Cooke – Percussion
- Marty Anderson - Keyboards
- Shannon Emmett - Synthesizer on "Ascending in St. Anne's" & "Secret Wishes"

== Production ==
- Rik Emmett producer
- Tony Daniels engineer
