= Absolutely (Rik Emmett album) =

Studio album by Rik Emmett
- Released: April 11, 1990
- Recorded: November 1989 – February 1990
- Studios: Phase One Studios (Toronto, Canada)
- Genre: Rock
- Length: 44:55
- Label: Charisma
- Producer: Rik Emmett

Rik Emmett chronology
Absolutely (1990)	Ipso Facto (1992)

Professional ratings
Review scores
Source	Rating
AllMusic	4/5 stars
Calgary Herald	B

Absolutely is the debut solo album by the Canadian rock guitarist Rik Emmett, released in 1990, after leaving the heavy metal band Triumph. The album was released in 1990 and went gold in Canada. The third cut on the album, "Saved by Love", was used for the closing credits of the movie Problem Child 2. The album includes ten songs and one instrumental track.

== Track listing ==
All tracks are written by (Rik Emmett) unless otherwise noted:

No.	Title	Writer(s)	Length
1.	"Drive Time"		4:21
2.	"Big Lie"		4:26
3.	"Saved by Love"		4:04
4.	"When a Heart Breaks"		3:43
5.	"World of Wonder"		3:58
6.	"Stand and Deliver"		5:28
7.	"The Way That You Love Me"	Rik Emmett / Bob Halligan, Jr.	4:21
8.	"Middle Ground"		3:58
9.	"Heaven Only Knows"		4:04
10.	"Smart, Fast, Mean and Lucky"	Rik Emmett / Graham Shaw	3:58
11.	"Passage (For Big Nick)"		2:32
Total length:			44:55

== Personnel ==
- Rik Emmett – guitars, synthesizers, lead vocals, background vocals on tracks 1–3, 6, & 8
- David Tkaczuk – keyboards, piano, arranging, synthesizers
- Colleen Allen – sax (soprano), background vocals on Tracks 2 & 6
- Chris Brockway – bass, background vocals on Tracks 1 – 3, 6 & 8
- Randy Cooke – drums
- Jeff Stevens – additional percussion, shaker, tambourine
- Colina Phillips, Joel Wade & Vivienne Williams – background vocals on Tracks 3, 5 and 9
- Paula Shear – background vocals on Tracks 1, 3, & 8

== Production ==
- Rik Emmett – producer
- Ross Munro – executive producer
- Earl Torno – engineer & mixing
- Rick Pacholko – assistant engineer
- George Graves – mastering
- Chris Chapman – photography

== Singles ==
- "Big Lie" – Charisma PRCD 023; released April 11, 1990 (USA)
- "Big Lie" – Duke Street Records DSRD-9047; released April 11, 1990 (Canada)
- "When a Heart Breaks/Open-ended Interview Rik Emmett" – Duke DSRDS-9063; released April 15, 1990 (Canada)
- "Saved By Love" – Duke DSRDS-9086; released April 18, 1990 (Canada)

== Charts ==
=== Album ===
Year	Chart	Position
October 18, 1990	Canada	25
November 8, 1992	The Billboard 200	52

=== Singles ===
Year	Single	Chart	Position
1990	"Big Lie"	Pop Singles	47
1990	"When a Heart Breaks"	Pop Singles	14
1991	"Saved by Love"	Pop Singles	17
1991	"World of Wonder"	Pop Singles	22
1991	"The Way That You Love Me"	Pop Singles	76
