= Dave Dunlop =

Canadian guitarist, composer and vocalist (born 1965)

Background information
- Also known as: Dave Dunlop
- Born: John David Dunlop; September 18, 1965 (age 60); Ottawa, Ontario, Canada
- Genres: Hard rock, Rock, Classical, Flamenco, Jazz, Blues
- Occupations: Guitarist, Songwriter, Producer, Recording Engineer
- Instrument: Guitar
- Years active: 1990–present
- Website: http://www.davedunlop.com/

John David Dunlop (born September 18, 1965, in Ottawa, Ontario) is a Canadian guitarist, composer, producer, recording engineer, and vocalist. Dunlop was a member, writer, guitarist, and backup singer in the Canadian rock band The Full Nine (Disney's Mammoth Records). Since 1996, he has had a successful musical relationship with Rik Emmett, sharing guitar-playing duties in The Rik Emmett Band, Strung-Out Troubadours, and Triumph.

In 2007, Strung-Out Troubadours won "Album of the Year" and "Group/Duo Of The Year" at the Canadian Smooth Jazz Awards, where they were the most heavily nominated act. Both Dunlop and his partner Rik Emmett were also nominated for "Best Guitarist".

He has been an integral member of Jeans 'n Classics since 2005, travelling around North America playing Pop and Rock shows with orchestras playing the music of Pink Floyd, The Beatlebackup Beck, Eric Clapton, and others.

Dave co-produced, co-engineered and co-mixed the upcoming (November 11, 2016) Mascot Records release "Rik Emmett & RESolution9" (Res9), working with Alex Lifeson of Rush, James LaBrie of Dream Theater, and Triumph members Gil Moore and Mike Levine.

On October 18, 2016, Dave released his long-awaited full-length album called "Monarch Girl". Guests on the record include Rik Emmett, Randy Cooke, David Blamires, Paul DeLong, and Don Breithaupt.

As of 2026, Dave continues to tour North America doing Symphonic Rock/Pop shows with Jeans'nClassics.

Dunlop also owns and operates "Room 9" recording studio in Toronto, Ontario, Canada.

== Personal ==
After finishing High School in Ottawa Ontario, Dave moved to Toronto to enrol in the Jazz program at Humber College, where he gained valuable experience playing in big ensembles that included horn sections, playing both Jazz and R & B repertoire.

While at Humber Dave met his future wife Deanne. They were married for 30 years until her untimely passing in 2016.

In 2018 he met Nancy and they married shortly thereafter. They live in Toronto Ontario with their two kids.

== Discography ==
=== Albums ===
- 1998 Insulin – Insulin
- 2002 The Full Nine – The Full Nine
- 2004 Dead Wait – The Full Nine
- 2006 Strung-Out Troubadours – Strung-Out Troubadours (with Rik Emmett)
- 2006 Live at Hugh's Room – Strung-Out Troubadours (with Rik Emmett)
- 2009 Push & Pull – Strung-Out Troubadours (with Rik Emmett)
- 2011 ReCovery Room 9 – Strung-Out Troubadours (with Rik Emmett)
- 2012 Then Again: Songs from the Triumph Catalogue – Rik Emmett (produced/recorded by Dave)
- 2015 " Best of the Troubs" – Rik Emmett & Dave Dunlop
- 2016 "RESolution9" – Rik Emmett (Producer)
- 2016 "Monarch Girl" – Dave Dunlop
