= Ipso Facto (album) =

Studio album by Rik Emmett
- Released: October 10, 1992
- Recorded: Phase One Studios, 1992
- Genre: Rock, Classical, Folk, Swing, Blues
- Length: 60:34
- Label: MCA
- Producer: Rik Emmett

Rik Emmett chronology
Absolutely (1990)	Ipso Facto (1992)	The Spiral Notebook (1995)

Professional ratings
Review scores
Source	Rating
Allmusic	3/5 stars

Ipso Facto is the second solo studio album by the Canadian rock guitarist Rik Emmett, released in 1992.

== Track listing ==
All tracks written by (Rik Emmett) unless otherwise noted:

Side one
No.	Title	Length
1.	"Straight Up"	5:14
2.	"Bang On"	3:51
3.	"Let Love Conquer All"	4:09
4.	"Heaven in Your Heart"	4:54
5.	"Dig a Little Deeper"	5:11
6.	"Lickity Bit"	2:22
7.	"Rainbow Man"	6:13

Side two
No.	Title	Writer(s)	Length
8.	"Out of the Blue"		5:42
9.	"Meet You There"		4:50
10.	"Can't Lie to Myself"		4:26
11.	"Do Me Good"		4:36
12.	"Calling St. Cecilia"		3:58
13.	"Transition"		2:06
14.	"Woke Up This Morning (Blues In My Fingers)"	(Rik Emmett / Lonnie Johnson)	3:01

2001 Bonus Tracks
No.	Title	Length
15.	"Saved By Love (Live)" (Live during 1990 Absolutely Tour)	5:18
16.	"Big Lie (Live)" (Live during 1990 Absolutely Tour)	8:23

== Personnel ==
- Rik Emmett - Guitars, Synthesizers, Vocals, Drum Programming
- Peter Cardinali – Bass ( Tracks: 1 - 3, 7, 9, 11)
- Tom Lewis – Bass ( Tracks: 4 - 6, 8, 10)
- Randy Cooke - Drums ( Tracks: 1 - 3, 7, 9, 11)
- Greg Critchley – Drums ( Tracks: 4 - 6, 8, 10)
- Richard Evans – Keyboards ( Tracks: 3 - 10)
- Ross Munro – Tambourine ( Tracks: 2)
- Brian Leonard – Shaker, Energy Coil ( Tracks: 3, 4, 8, 11)
- Colleen Allen – Soprano Saxophone ( Tracks: 4 - 6)
- Dick Armin – Cello ( Tracks: 12 & 13)
- Pedal Steel – Steve Smith ( Tracks: 12 & 13)

=== Backing Vocals ===
- Rik Emmett ( Tracks: 1 & 2)
- Colleen Allen ( Tracks: 3, 5 - 7, 9, 11)
- Donna O'Connor ( Tracks: 3, 5, 6, 9, 11)
- Rebecca Jenkins ( Tracks: 3 & 7)
- Debbie Fleming ( Tracks: 5, 6, 9, 11)
- Joanne Powell ( Tracks: 7)

== Production ==
- Produced by – Rik Emmett, Ross Munro
- Sequence By – Rik Emmett & Andy Hermant
- Recorded At – Manta/Eastern Sound. Toronto, Ontario, Canada
- Recorded When – June – August 1992
- Recorded by – John Naslen & John Wheels Hurlbut
- Engineered by – Ed Stone & Ron Searles
- Engineered At – Phase One Studios. Toronto, Ontario, Canada
- Mixed At – McClear Pathé. Toronto, Ontario, Canada
- Mixed by – Damian Korner, Ron Searles, Bill Hermans, Tom Trafalski
- Mastered by – George Marino
- Mastered At – Sterling Sound. NY, NY.

== Singles ==
- "Straight Up/Open-ended Interview Rik Emmett" - Duke DSRDS-9232; released October 8, 1992 (Canada)
- "Bang On/Open-ended Interview Rik Emmett" - Duke DSRDS-8121; released October 15, 1992 (Canada)
- "Out of the Blue/Meet You There" - Polystar PSDW 3004; released November 12, 1992 (Japan)
- "Let Love Conquer All" - Alert Music Inc. DPRO 229; released January 11, 1993 (Canada)
- "Out of the Blue (Radio Edit)" - Alert Music Inc. DPRO 234; released January 18, 1993 (Canada)
- "Out of the Blue (Radio Edit)" - Duke Street DSRDS-9265; released January 18, 1993 (Canada)

== Charts ==
=== Album ===
Year	Chart	Position
October 18, 1992	Canada	33
November 8, 1992	The Billboard 200	88

=== Singles ===
Year	Single	Chart	Position
1992	"Dig a Little Deeper"	Pop Singles	66
1992	"Straight Up"	Pop Singles	60
1992	"Out of the Blue"	Pop Singles	88
1992	"Heaven in Your Heart"	Pop Singles	44
1992	"Bang On"	Pop Singles	48
