= Monkey House (band) =

Musical group

- Origin: Toronto, Ontario, Canada
- Genres: Jazz, rock
- Years active: 1992–present
- Labels: Aquarius/EMI, Marigold/Koch Records, GDM, Alma/Universal
- Members: Don Breithaupt - lead vocals, keyboards; Mark Kelso - drums; Pat Kilbride - bass; Justin Abedin - guitar
- Website: www.monkeyhouseofficial.com

Monkey House is a musical group founded by Don Breithaupt, a Canadian pianist, singer/songwriter, composer, arranger, producer and author. The group got its name from a 1968 book by Kurt Vonnegut.

== History ==
The band formed in 1992, performing songs Breithaupt had written that seemed too jazzy or different for other bands to cover. A number of guest artists have contributed songs and have performed on their albums, including Drew Zingg, Elliott Randall, Michael Leonhart, and Jay Graydon. Steely Dan is one of Breithaupt's biggest influences. The band makes melodic pop with a sophisticated, jazzy twist, with some horn arrangements.

Their debut album Welcome to the Club was released in 1992, on the Aquarius label, based in Canada. It included a cover of a song written by Donald Fagen of Steely Dan called "Lazy Nina", which was covered by Greg Phillinganes in 1984, but never recorded by Fagen himself.

Their second album True Winter, on the Marigold label, released in 1998, found Breithaupt collaborating with Little Feat’s Richie Hayward and David Blamires of the Pat Metheny Group.

In 2005 the compilation album Big Money: Singles Remasters Rarities 1992-2005 was released. It contained thirteen tracks from the first two Monkey House albums, plus four fresh tracks including the single "Tough Love". Guests included Kevin Breit (Norah Jones), Mark Kelso (Gino Vannelli), as well as Hayward and Blamires.

Their fourth album Headquarters was released in 2012, on the Alma record label, which is affiliated with the Universal Music Group. Guest artists included Kim Mitchell, Rik Emmett, Drew Zingg and Michael Leonhart.

An album anthology entitled Retrospective was released in 2013, which includes almost everything Monkey House released over their first two decades. In addition to tunes from their first three albums, the 44-song anthology includes previously unreleased material like "I'm Not That Guy" from the Headquarters sessions, five instrumental tracks and some interviews.

A sixth album was released in June 2016, Left, on the Alma/Universal label. The title references the fact that Breithaupt packed up and moved from Toronto to the west coast, or "left coast", arriving in the Los Angeles area by February 2013. The core group of musicians on the album are drummer Mark Kelso, bassist Pat Kilbride, and guitarist Justin Abedin, with Breithaupt contributing on keyboards, and bassist Peter Cardinali guesting on one track. Besides Elliott Randall and Jay Graydon, other guests include backing vocalists David Blamires (Pat Metheny Group) Lucy Woodward (Snarky Puppy) on backing vocals, William Sperandei on trumpet, and saxophonist Donny McCaslin. Drew Zingg and Michael Leonhart also return to contribute solos. The album debuted at number 9 on the iTunes U.S. Jazz chart, number 2 on the iTunes Canada jazz chart, and peaked at Number 24 on the Billboard Jazz Albums Chart

== Discography ==
- Welcome to the Club (Aquarius / EMI, 1992)
- True Winter (Marigold / Koch Records, 1998)
- Big Money: Singles Remasters Rarities 1992-2005 (GDM, 2005)
- Headquarters (Alma /Universal, 2012)
- Retrospective (GDM, 2013)
- Left (Alma / Universal, 2016)
- Friday (Alma / Universal, 2019)
- Remember the Audio (Alma/Universal, 2022)
- Crashbox (2025)

== See also ==
- The Orbit Room
