= Laughed Last =

Studio album by Lili Añel
- Released: March 2004
- Recorded: July – November 2003
- Studio: East Hill Studios, New York
- Genre: Folk, jazz
- Length: 48:33
- Label: Palmetto
- Producer: Matt Balitsaris, Jeff Berman

Professional ratings
Review scores
Source	Rating
AllMusic	4.5/5 stars

Laughed Last is the debut album by American singer-songwriter Lili Añel, released on the Palmetto Records label.

Añel at the Laughed Last release show, Bottom Line in New York, with Palmetto Records owner Matt Balitsaras in 1994

== Track listing ==
1. "Laughed Last" – 3:51
2. "The Wrong Time" – 5:00
3. "On the Run" – 5:18
4. "Never Ever Say It" – 4:02
5. "Love Is It" – 4:21
6. "Dance the Life Away" – 4:21
7. "Baby When?" – 5:09
8. "Say It Isn’t True" – 3:46
9. "I Still Have You" – 3:39
10. "Tonight" – 4:14

All compositions by Lili Añel except:

- "The Wrong Time" by Barbara Añel
- "Love Is It" by Lili Añel and Linda Zecchino
- "Dance the Life Away" by Lili Añel and Reuben Slater

== Personnel ==
Musicians

- Lili Anel — vocals, guitars
- Matt Balitsaris – electric & acoustic guitars, synth programming, percussion, hand claps
- Jeff Berman – drums, percussion, midi-vibes
- Paul Adamy – bass
- Joey Cardello – congas, pandero, cuica on Tonight; congas on Dance The Life Away, djembe on Let Her Go
- Mark Egan – bass on "Love Is It"
- Brian Mitchell – accordion on "Never Ever Say It"
- Barbara Añel – background vocals
- Cornelius Bumpus – saxophone on "Tonight and Baby When?"
- Matthew Kofo Ayanfowora – djembe on "Let Her Go, talking drum on "On the Run"

Engineers

- Scott Ansel – Head engineer
- Charlie Dos Santos – Assistant engineer
- Jeff Archuletta – Assistant engineer
- Liu Ortiz – Assistant engineer
- Mastered by A.T. Michael McDonal at Foothill Digital
