= The Spiral Notebook =

Studio album by Rik Emmett
- Released: March 12, 1995
- Recorded: February 1993–January 1995
- Genre: Rock
- Length: 49:25
- Label: Vanguard
- Producer: Rik Emmett

Rik Emmett chronology
| Ipso Facto (1992) | The Spiral Notebook (1995) | Ten Invitations From The Mistress Of Mr. E (1997) |

Professional ratings
Review scores
| Source | Rating |
|---|---|
| Allmusic | Read |

The Spiral Notebook is the third solo album by Canadian rock guitarist Rik Emmett, released in 1995.

== Track listing ==
All tracks are written by Rik Emmett.

| No. | Title | Length |
|---|---|---|
| 1. | "Anything You Say" | 4:07 |
| 2. | "Raise High" | 5:43 |
| 3. | "The Longing" | 5:21 |
| 4. | "Talk it Over" (With Karen Leblanc) | 4:44 |
| 5. | "Casey's on a Roll" | 4:26 |
| 6. | "Let Me be the One" | 3:48 |
| 7. | "Little Bitta Love" | 3:03 |
| 8. | "Silent Revolutions" | 4:47 |
| 9. | "The Numbers Game" | 3:40 |
| 10. | "The Pendulum" | 4:27 |
| 11. | "The Hardest Part" | 4:48 |
| Total length: | | 49:25 |

== Personnel ==
- Rik Emmett – guitars, synthesizers, vocals
- Neil Chapman – rhythm guitar
- Steve Skingley – bass
- Randy Cooke – percussion, conga, overdubs, shaker, tambourine
- Charlie Cooley – drums
- Marty Anderson – keyboards, pre-programming, engineer, programming
- Karen Leblanc – vocals on "Talk it Over"
- Kaytalin Kiss – background vocals
- Kathy Martorino – background vocals

== Production ==
- Rik Emmett – producer
- Ed Stone – engineer, mixing, overdub engineer
- Fraser Hill – engineer, overdub engineer, mixing
- Andrew Frank – engineer, mixing
- Everett Ravestein – engineer
- Rob Laidlan – assistant engineer
- Bill Kipper – mastering, sequencing
- Andrew MacNaughtan – photography
- Michael Wrycraft – art direction, illustration, design

== Singles ==
- "Let Me be the One/Anything You Say" - Vanguard PRO-821; released March 9, 1995 (Canada)
- "Anything You Say/Casey's on a Roll/Little Bitta Love" - Vanguard PRO-713; released March 14, 1995 (Canada)
- "Anything You Say/Raise High/The Longing" - Intercord 988.189; released March 21, 1995 (Holland)

== Charts ==
=== Album ===
| Year | Chart | Position |
|---|---|---|
| March 12, 1995 | Canada | 16 |
| March 26, 1995 | The Billboard 200 | 188 |

=== Singles ===
| Year | Single | Chart | Position |
|---|---|---|---|
| 1995 | "Let Me be the One" | Pop Singles | 31 |
| 1992 | "Anything You Say" | Pop Singles | 26 |
