= David Drew Zingg =

American photojournalist (1923–2000)

- Zingg c. 1999
- Born: December 14, 1923; Montclair, New Jersey, U.S.
- Died: July 28, 2000 (aged 76); São Paulo, Brazil
- Education: Columbia University
- Occupations: Photographer; journalist
- Spouse: Elizabeth Foulk (m. 1950–1968; divorced)
- Children: 3

David Drew Zingg (December 14, 1923 – July 28, 2000) was an American photographer and journalist. He spent nearly forty years in Brazil (mostly split between Rio de Janeiro and São Paulo), becoming an important figure in the cultural life of the both cities and the bossa nova movement of the 1960s.

Brazilian actress Leila Diniz photographed by David Drew Zingg. This picture caused an uproar at the time of its publication, due to its mixture of pregnancy and nudity.

== Marriage ==
He married Elizabeth Foulk in 1950. Together, they had three sons: Peter (b. 1951), Christopher (b. 1955), and Drew (1957–2025). The couple divorced in 1968.

== Death ==
David Drew Zingg died on July 28, 2000, in São Paulo, Brazil, of multiple organ failure, after complications resulting from prostate surgery.
