= Liberty Manifesto =

Studio album by Airtime
- Released: November 12, 2007
- Recorded: 2007
- Genre: Hard rock
- Length: 48:00
- Labels: Rockit Sounds, Escape Music, Avalon
- Producers: Rik Emmett, Michael Shotton

Airtime chronology
Strung-Out Troubadours (2006)	Liberty Manifesto (2007)

Professional ratings
Review scores
Source	Rating
Allmusic	link

Liberty Manifesto is the debut studio album by the Canadian hard rock band Airtime, a collaboration between guitarist Rik Emmett and Von Groove percussionist Mike Shotton, which was released in 2007.

== Track listing ==
No.	Title	Length
1.	"Edge of Your Mind"	4:24
2.	"Midnight Black & Blue"	3:39
3.	"Liberty"	6:17
4.	"Headstream"	1:55
5.	"River Runs Deep"	4:22
6.	"Find Your Way"	4:46
7.	"Addicted"	4:21
8.	"Code 9"	5:08
9.	"Rise"	4:39
10.	"Moving Day"	4:02
11.	"Transmutation"	5:27
Total length:		48:00

2007 United Kingdom Bonus Track
No.	Title	Length
12.	"Cryin' Shame"	4:42

2008 Japanese Bonus Track
No.	Title	Length
12.	"Tomorrow's Promise"

Two bonus tracks were issued for non-North American releases: "Cryin' Shame" (Escape Music, ESM162) and "Tomorrow's Promise" (Avalon, MICP-10703)

== Personnel ==
- Rik Emmett - Guitars, Vocals, Bass, Synthesizers
- Michael Shotton - Percussion, Drums, Backing Vocals, Noise
- Don Breithaupt - Keyboards

== Production ==
- Rik Emmett - Producer, Engineer
- Michael Shotton - Engineer, Mixing, Producer
- Rick Andersen - Mixing
- Nick Blagona - Mastering
- Jim Bullotta - Art Direction, Design
- Darko - Photography
