= Every Second In Between =

Every Second in Between

Studio album by Lili Añel
- Released: September 30, 2009
- Recorded: July 2008 through July 2009 at MorningStar Studios, Spring House, PA
- Genre: Jazz, pop, rock
- Length: 45:20
- Label: Wall-I Records (Self-released)
- Producer: Glenn Barratt.

Professional ratings
Review scores
Source	Rating
• "Shooting star" Reviewer Magazine •"blow[s] your mind" JazzTimes •"refuses to surrender her identity"USA Today •Top 10 Jazz releases for 2009 •"Enduring Brilliance"Exclusive Magazine •Allmusic	3.5/5 stars

Every Second in Between is the fifth album by American singer-songwriter Lili Añel. Añel took measures to make sure the album was properly promoted this time around by hiring the services of a publicity firm. This resulted in television appearances on NBC, along with numerous reviews and radio airplay.

== Track listing ==
1. I Don't Need You This Way – 4:37
2. One More Night – 4:23
3. Supposed To Be – 3:46
4. That's All I Want from You – 4:21
5. So Far Away' – 4:40
6. Can't Fall Out of Love" – 3:43
7. Much to my Surprise – 4:21
8. George Bailey's Lament" – 3:10
9. Won't You Stay – 4:14
10. Voyager – 4:52
11. Goodbye – 3:27

All compositions by Lili Añel except:

- "That's All I Want from You" by Fritz Roter
- "So Far Away" by Lili Añel and Barbara Añel

== Personnel ==
Musicians

- Lili Añel — vocals, guitars
- Joel Bryant – Wurlitzer, Rhodes Piano, Hammond B3
- Mayra Casales – percussion
- John Conahan – piano, arrangements, string arrangement "Voyager" and "That’s All I Want from You"; vocals on "So Far Away" and "Much to My Surprise"
- Chico Huff – electric bass, upright bass
- Jef Lee Johnson – guitar, mandolin
- Grant Macavoy – drums
- Naomi Grey – cello on "That's All I Want from You"
- Glenn Barratt – guitar on "So Far Away", "Much to My Surprise", "Won't You Stay"
- Erik Mitchell – vocals "Much to My Surprise"
- Gary Schreiner – chromatic harmonica on "Can't Fall Out of Love"

String quartet on "Voyager"

- Michelle Bishop, violin
- Eliza Cho, violin
- Jenny Lorenzo, cello

Engineers

- Glenn Barratt
- Dave Gearhart
- Dave Schonauer
