= Edge of Tomorrow (soundtrack) =

Edge of Tomorrow: Original Motion Picture Soundtrack

Film score by Christophe Beck
- Released: June 2, 2014
- Recorded: 2013–2014
- Genre: Film score
- Length: 45:31
- Label: WaterTower Music
- Producer: Christophe Beck

Christophe Beck chronology
Muppets Most Wanted (2014)	Edge of Tomorrow (2014)	Let's Be Cops (2014)

Edge of Tomorrow: Original Motion Picture Soundtrack is the score album accompanying the 2014 film of the same name directed by Doug Liman, starring Tom Cruise and Emily Blunt, and featured musical score composed by Christophe Beck. This is Liman's first film not to be scored by John Powell, as the composer decided to score for animation films over live-action. Hence, Ramin Djawadi was brought in as the film's composer in September 2013, But Djawadi was later replaced by Beck in that January, making it his maiden composition for a science fiction film.

Liman contributed to the film's music by providing basic outputs and ideas whenever necessary. Instead of approaching for traditional themes, Beck preferred a non-traditional and non-patriotic approach, with percussion and distorted orchestral music. Beck's experimentation with the themes, had provided few sounds that are electronic, sonic and metal pop genre, while attempting various colors and themes into the score.

Edge of Tomorrow's soundtrack, containing mostly Beck's score, was first released in ITunes on June 2, 2014 and saw a wide digital release by WaterTower Music on June 4, which would be followed by a physical release on June 23. The soundtrack was released into a two-disc vinyl edition by Mondo on June 30, 2017. The score album received positive reviews from critics with praise towards Beck's score production and composition.

== Development ==
Liman's frequent collaborator John Powell turned his focus to score computer-animated films, which resulted him to be replaced by Ramin Djawadi, known for scoring Game of Thrones, but was replaced by Christophe Beck in January 2014. The film is Beck's first full-fledged attempt on scoring a science fiction film, although he previously scored the thriller film Runner Runner (2013). To prepare, Beck watched the film with temp tracks, including one from the 2012 film Battleship, and experimented by repeating the music with the scenes, but because this approach did not frequently fit the events on the screen, Beck used minimal repetition in the film, as he recalled "The day is reset dozens of times in the film and it would get very repetitive to approach that musically the same way every time".

Beck initially tried for "traditional heroic themes" that involved horns and trumpets, but he said Liman "preferred a non-traditional approach, driven by percussion and distorted orchestra". To that end, Beck used the pizzicato playing technique, "not in the traditional, 'plinky-plinky-isn't-this-funny way', but a little darker, and always accompanied by some higher concept synth colors". The film's extensive approach into synth-heavy music, was credited to the director's vision as Liman "constantly encourages him to find interesting ways to get that muscular, futuristic sound". There were no romantic themes as "since it is not the central story, the approach to romance is extremely restrained". With Liman's approach, the composer said there were "only a couple of traditional themes" in the film, including one for Rita (Emily Blunt). He did not want the alien characters to be musically characterised as terror or panic, but more about mystery and intrigue, as "by the time Cage comes face to face with these guys, he's not afraid of dying – he's just trying to solve a puzzle."

The distorted orchestral samples enhanced the comedic tone of the extended sequences where Cage recurrently dies in battle, as the director felt it was important for the audience to find humor in this sequence. It was also one of the challenging aspect of the score, as "how to keep the film feeling light in those moments without resorting to the kind of overt comedy scoring he have done in the past". He also liked the percussion sounded, which resulted with several sessions in London and collaborations with acclaimed percussionists. Beck tuned the bass frequencies to bring a "sonic boom" sound, while orchestral music had complemented with the symphonic and heroic approach, from a "gnaringly metal sound".

Beck added that Edge of Tomorrow is influenced by several war films, but "in many of those films the music ignores the patriotic aspects, and emphasizes tragedy, or fear, as in Saving Private Ryan or The Thin Red Line (1998)". For this film, he went for a non-patriotic approach" and went for "colors that were more black and grey than red, white, and blue". Doug appreciated Beck's early attempts at "those scenes that these soldiers were ready to kick ass, and the music needed to reflect that."

== Reception ==
James Southall of Movie Wave gave a negative review, saying "if it was really considered essential to stick to an established sound, whether the far more entertaining Oblivion / Tron Legacy lineage might have been one that could have worked instead. Sad to say, Edge of Tomorrow does barely anything – the more appealing parts are too deeply buried in the murky surroundings to make me want to revisit them; as a result the whole is less than the sum of its parts, a sum which frankly isn't that vast in the first place despite the signs of life that emerge towards the end."

Lauren Beverly of The Rogers Revue said "The soundtrack to “Edge of Tomorrow” is one of those that you definitely must have in your music collection. The combination of techno, sound effects and classical music make this soundtrack unique and beautiful. The way Beck combines each element creates a musical journey of epic proportions. Each track has its own unique sound, which makes it outstanding and worth every second. This soundtrack is great for all listeners, especially for fans of techno and classical music." Richard Propes of The Independent Critic mentioned that "Beck's original score weaves its way through the film's darkly humorous terrain". It was shortlisted as one among the 114 contenders for Best Original Score category at the 87th Academy Awards.

== Track listing ==
No.	Title	Length
1.	"Angel Of Verdun (Main Titles)"	2:56
2.	"No Courage Without Fear"	3:00
3.	"D-Day"	2:35
4.	"Mimics And Alphas"	1:25
5.	"PT"	1:16
6.	"Find Me When You Wake Up"	2:05
7.	"Navigating The Beach"	2:01
8.	"Winning The War"	1:27
9.	"Combat Training"	1:16
10.	"Deadweight"	1:31
11.	"Again!"	1:48
12.	"Solo Flight"	3:11
13.	"Decoy"	1:23
14.	"Whitehall"	2:09
15.	"Uncharted Territory"	1:39
16.	"I'm Out"	1:53
17.	"They Know We're Coming"	2:06
18.	"Caged In"	2:04
19.	"Ritaliation"	1:39
20.	"The Omega"	1:23
21.	"Welcome To London Major"	2:22
22.	"Live Die Repeat (End Titles)"	4:22
Total length:		45:31

== Additional music ==
Songs that are not included in the album, but featured in the film includes:

Additional music
No.	Title	Music	Length
1.	"This Is Not the End"	Fieldwork
2.	"Massive Mellow"	Daniel Lenz
3.	"Railroad Track"	Willy Moon
4.	"Trip Into The Light"	Jeremy & The Harlequins
5.	"Love Me Again"	John Newman

== Personnel ==
Credits adapted from the CD liner notes.

- Christophe Beck – composer, producer
- Leo Birenberg – additional music
- John Ashton Thomas – orchestration
- The Chamber Orchestra of London – orchestra
- Tim Davies – orchestra conductor
- Darrell Alexander – orchestra contractor
- Gareth Griffiths – orchestra contractor
- Dave Hage – copyist
- Mark Graham – copyist
- Dakota Music – music preparation
- Joanne Kane Music Services – music preparation
- Zach Robinson – music co-ordinator
- George Oulton – assistant engineer
- Laurence Anslow – assistant engineer
- Fredrik Rinman – synthesizer programming
- Malcolm Pardon – synthesizer programming
- Michael White – synthesizer programming
- Adam Miller – digital recordist
- Casey Stone – recording, mixing
- Allan Jenkins – music editing
- Fernand Bos – music editing
- Dave Collins – mastering
- Julianne Jordan – music supervision
- Darren Higman – executive in-charge of music (Warner Bros. Pictures)
- Paul Broucek – executive in-charge of music (Warner Bros. Pictures)
- Jason Linn – executive director (WaterTower Music)

== Chart performance ==
Chart positions
Chart (2014)	Peak position
UK Official Soundtracks Chart (OCC)	33
US Billboard 200	119
US Soundtrack Albums (Billboard)	21
