= Headquarters, New Jersey =

Populated place in Hunterdon County, New Jersey, US

- Unincorporated community
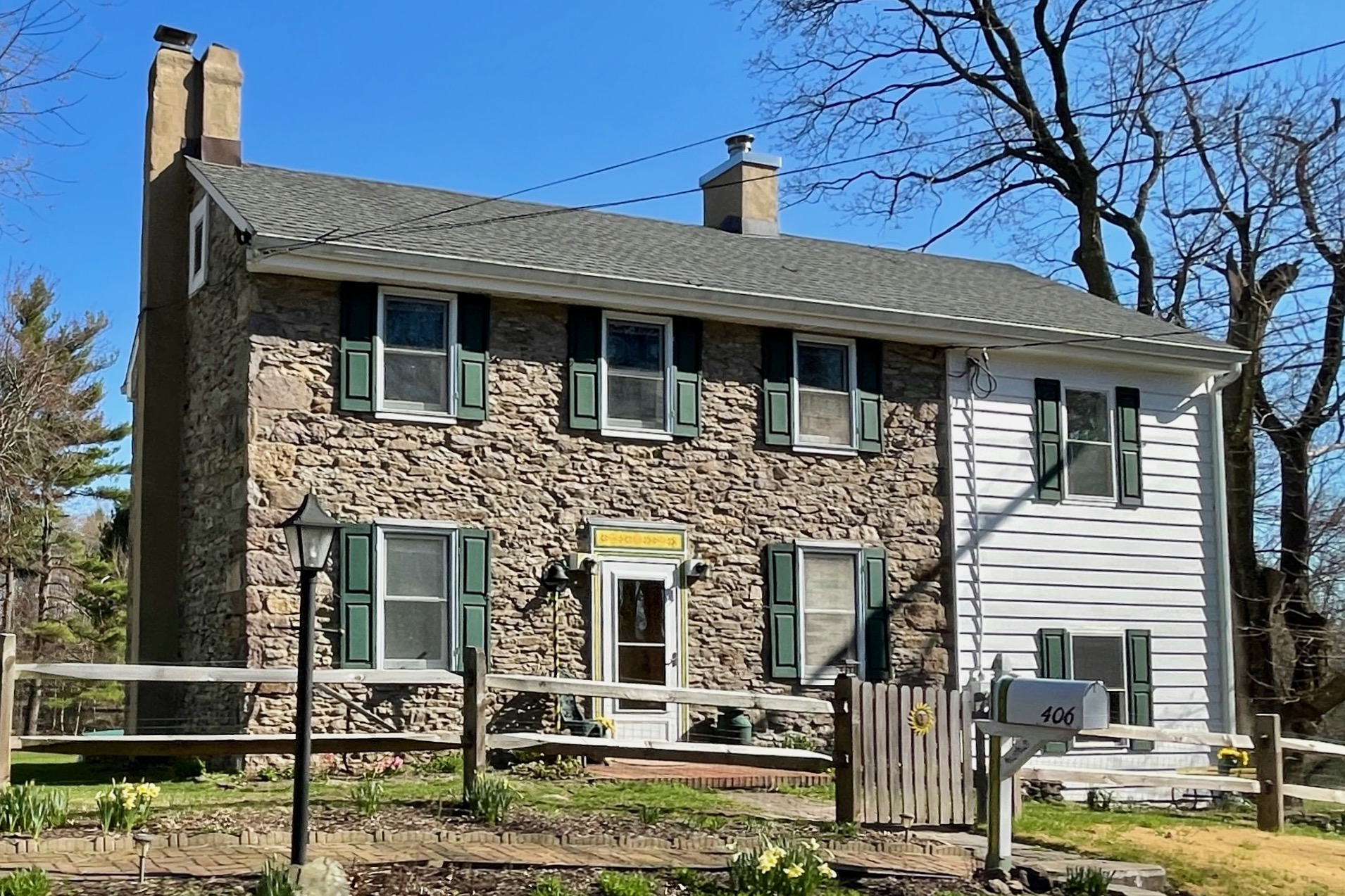
- Stone House on Rosemont-Ringoes Road

- Location within Hunterdon County, New Jersey Location within New Jersey Location within the United States
- Coordinates: 40°26′36″N 74°55′23″W
- Country: United States
- State: New Jersey
- County: Hunterdon
- Township: Delaware
- Elevation: 276 ft (84 m)
- Time zone: UTC−05:00 (Eastern (EST))
  - Summer (DST): UTC−04:00 (EDT)
- GNIS feature ID: 877026

Headquarters is an unincorporated community located within the Amwell Valley of Delaware Township in Hunterdon County, New Jersey. The settlement is centered around the intersection of Zentek Road and County Route 604 (Rosemont-Ringoes Road). It is about 3 miles (4.8 km) from Ringoes to the east and 1 mile (1.6 km) from Sergeantsville to the west. The Headquarters Historic District was listed on the state and national registers of historic places in 2011 and had its boundary increased in 2016.

== History ==
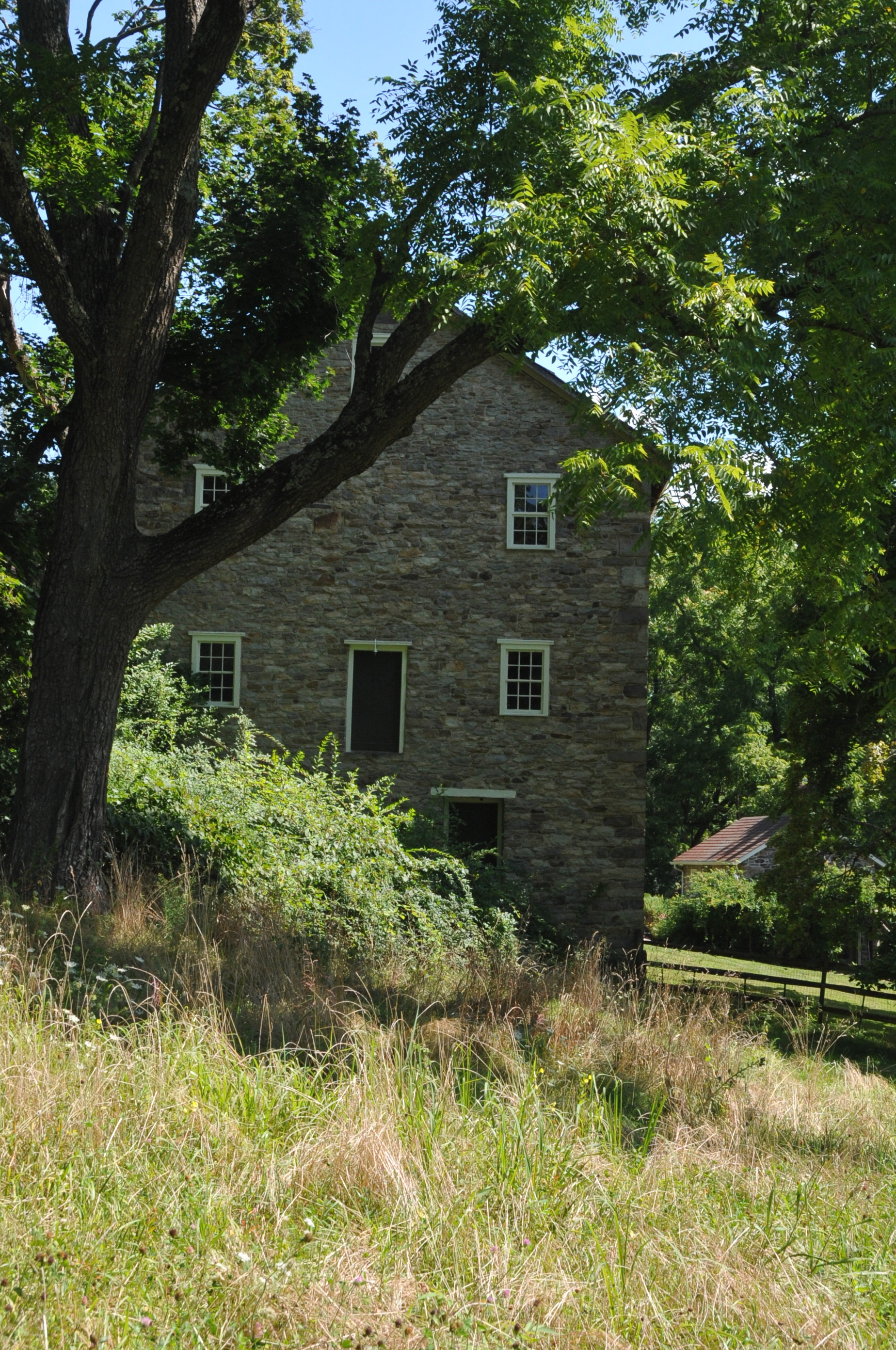
Grist mill on Zentek Road

Headquarters was the site of a grist mill built by John Opdycke (1710–1777) in 1735 along the Caponockons Creek, a tributary of the Neshanic River. The mill was one of the first in Hunterdon County. The current mill was built in 1754 at the same site. It was later rebuilt in 1877 by John A. Carrell. The industry thrived until the early 20th century when the mill shut down.

The community is named Headquarters after the local tradition that George Washington used the stone house built here in 1758 as such for a few days during the American Revolutionary War.

The district was first established as a historic area by Delaware Township in the 1980s to push back against a widening of CR 604.

== Historic district ==
- Headquarters Historic District
- U.S. National Register of Historic Places
- U.S. Historic district
- New Jersey Register of Historic Places
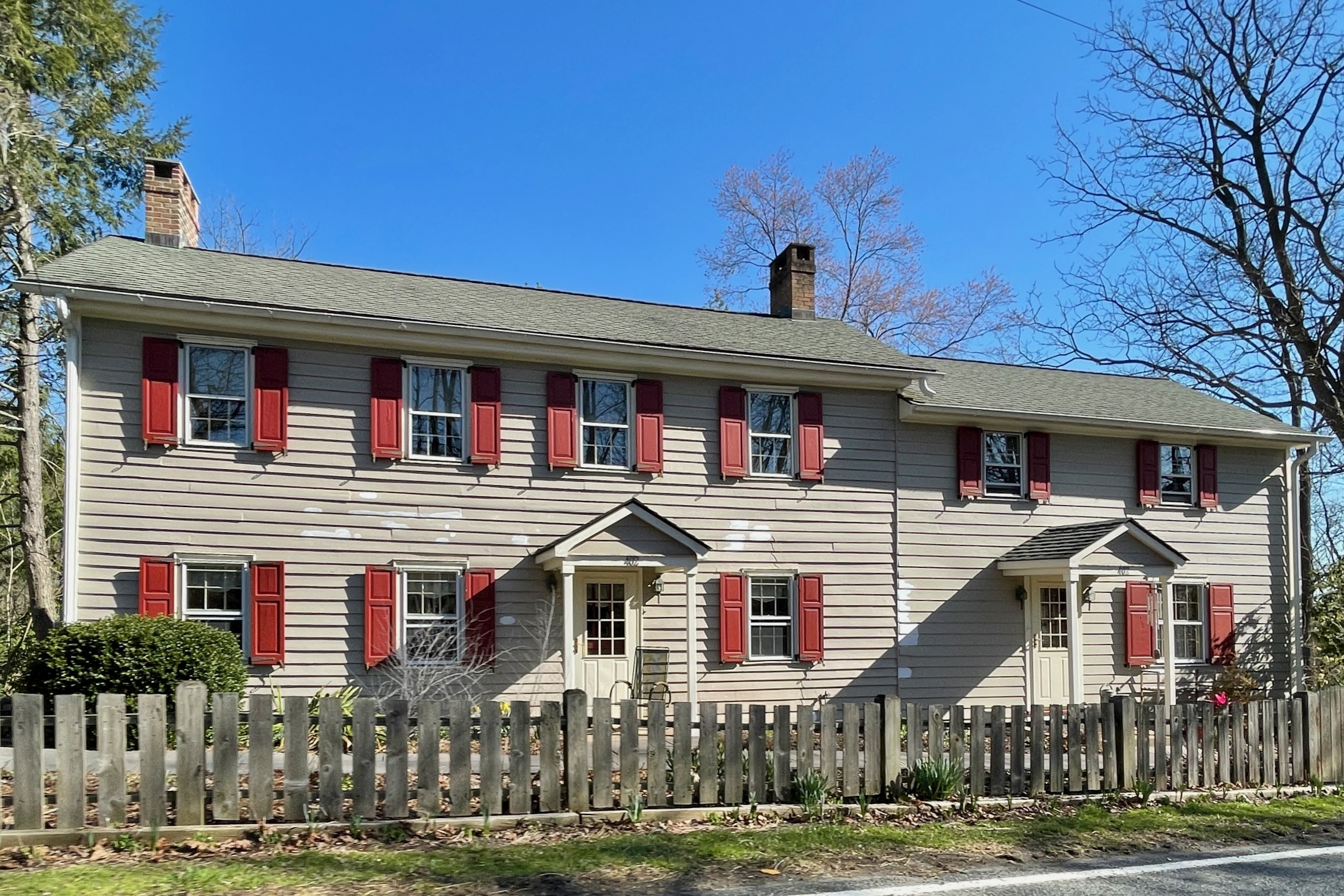
- House at 402 Rosemont-Ringoes Road
- Location: Zentek Road and Rosemont-Ringoes Road
- Nearest city: Sergeantsville, New Jersey
- Area: 22.5 acres (9.1 ha)
- Built: 1735
- Architectural style: Georgian, Colonial Revival
- NRHP reference No.: 11000447 (original); 15000798 (increase)
- NJRHP No.: 5091; 5463

Significant dates
- Added to NRHP: July 14, 2011
- Boundary increase: February 8, 2016
- Designated NJRHP: May 24, 2011; December 16, 2015

The Headquarters Historic District is a 22.5-acre (9.1 ha) historic district encompassing the community. It was added to the National Register of Historic Places on July 14, 2011, for its significance in architecture, industry, and settlement from 1735 to 1929. The district includes seven contributing buildings, three contributing structures, and one contributing sites. The boundary was increased on February 8, 2016. The increase included the mill pond and dam and added about 5.5 acres (2.2 ha) to the original 17 acres (6.9 ha).

Headquarters House at 6 Zentek Road was built in 1758, probably by Opdycke, and features vernacular Georgian architecture with Victorian embellishments. The house at 402 Rosemont-Ringoes Road was built c. 1800–1840 and shows modern Colonial Revival embellishment.

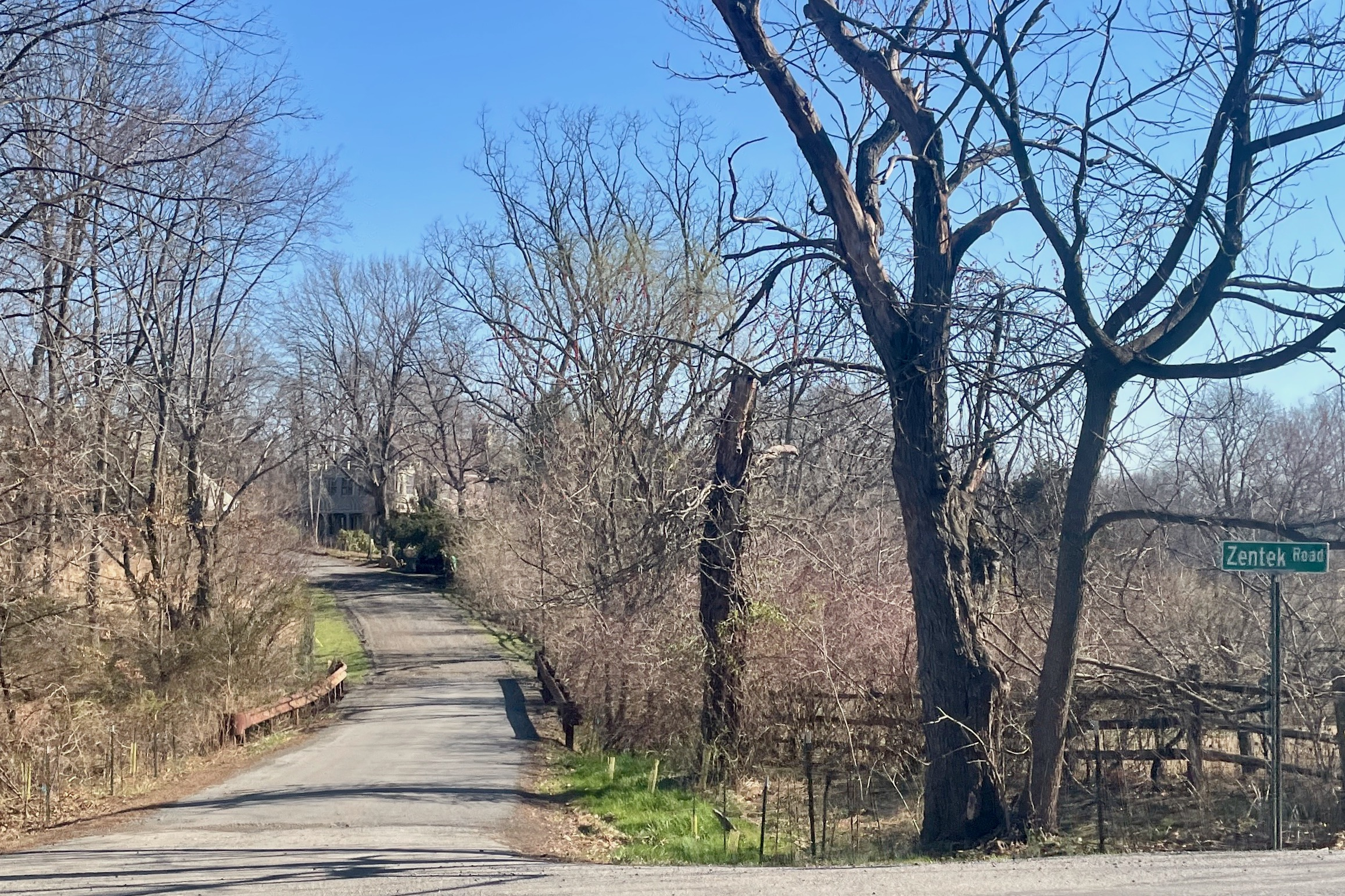
Headquarters House and grist mill in the distance, on Zentek Road

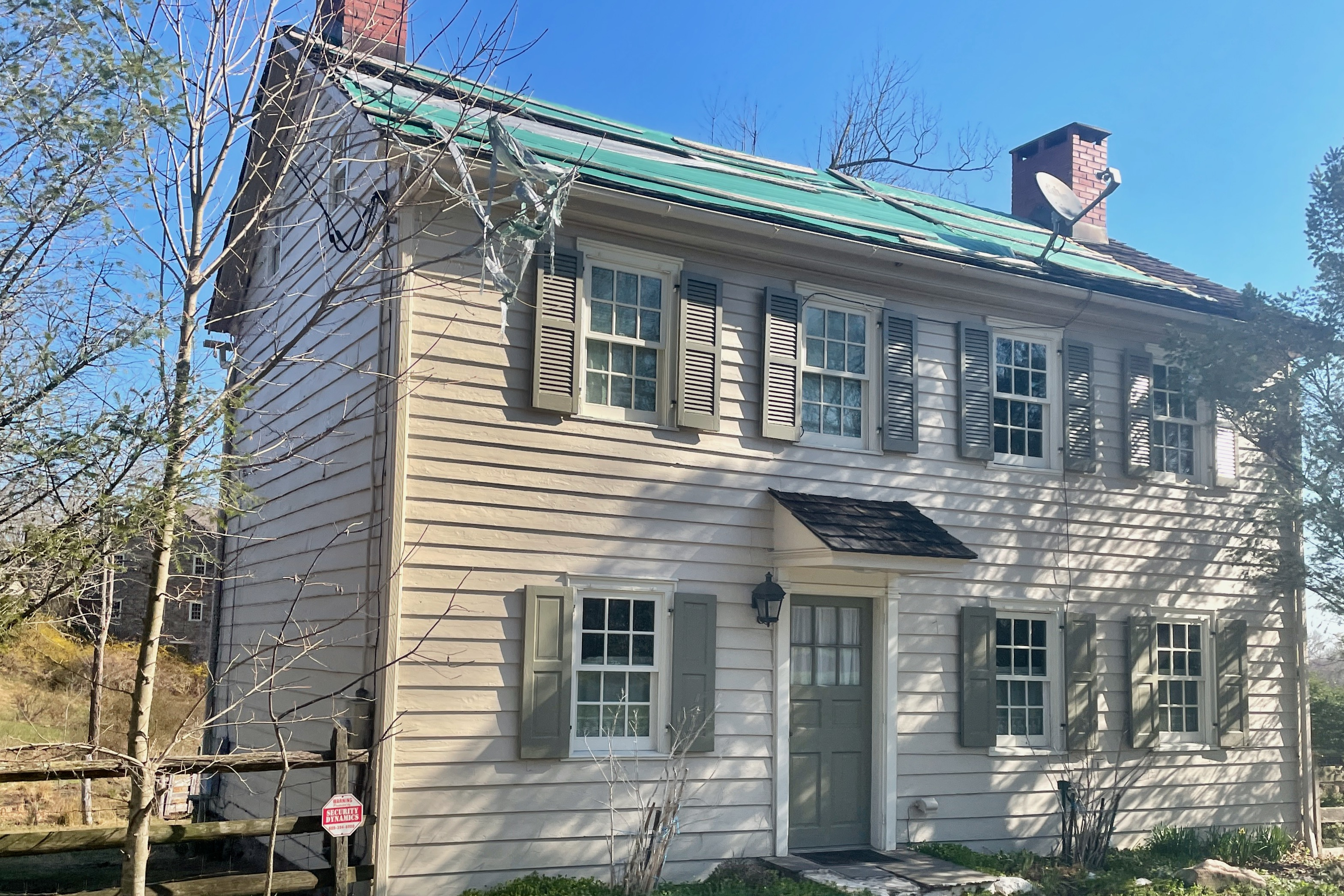
House by the intersection of Rosemount-Ringoes and Zentek roads

== See also ==
- National Register of Historic Places listings in Hunterdon County, New Jersey
