= Michael Leonhart =

American musician (born 1974)

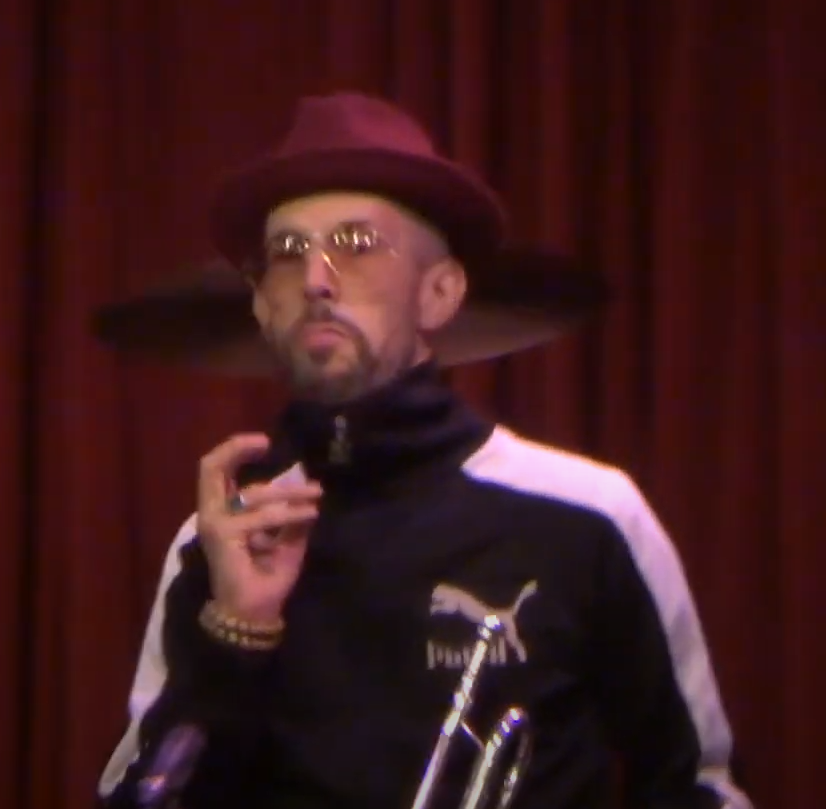
- Leonhart with Sean Ono Lennon in 2022.

Background information
- Born: April 21, 1974 (age 51)
- Genres: Jazz, rock, pop
- Occupation: Musician
- Instruments: Trumpet, trombone, flugelhorn
- Labels: Sunnyside, Truth and Soul
- Website: michaelleonhart.com

Michael Leonhart (born April 21, 1974) is an American jazz trumpeter and multi-instrumentalist.

== Solo career ==
In 1992 Leonhart was honored with the first Grammy Award for outstanding high school musician in the US (he attended Fiorello H. LaGuardia High School). He was the youngest Grammy recipient to date. He was 17 years old. In February of the same year ABC World News named him Person of the Week.

Leonhart has performed with Steely Dan since 1996, recording two albums with them, including 2000's Grammy winning Album of the Year Two Against Nature on which he was a featured soloist, arranger, and conductor. He co-produced Donald Fagen's fourth solo album, Sunken Condos (2012).

He recorded with Yoko Ono as a featured member of The Plastic Ono Band in 2009 for her album, Between My Head and the Sky and again in 2013 on her album Take Me to the Land of Hell. He played with Monkey House on two albums: Headquarters (2012) and Left (2016).

In 2015, he collaborated with the Antibalas and The Dap-Kings horn sections, Mark Ronson, and Bruno Mars to record "Uptown Funk" and other tracks on the album Uptown Special (2015).

He has also worked with A Tribe Called Quest, John Barry, James Brown, Busta Rhymes, David Byrne, Mos Def, DJ Spooky, Brian Eno, Bill Frisell, Levon Helm, Lenny Kravitz, Arto Lindsay, Henry Mancini, Arif Mardin, Wynton Marsalis, Michael McDonald, Bobby McFerrin, Natalie Merchant, Q-Tip, Raekwon, Bonnie Raitt, Joshua Redman, Todd Rundgren, Skizm, Slash, Steven Tyler, Caetano Veloso, and Bill Withers.

== Michael Leonhart & the Avramina 7 ==
After 40 plus recordings as the house trumpet player for Truth and Soul Records, the Brooklyn-based funk and soul label released Leonhart's heavy-funk concept album Seahorse and the Storyteller in 2009.

== Personal life ==
Michael Leonhart is the son of jazz bassist Jay Leonhart and the brother of vocalist Carolyn Leonhart.

== Discography ==
=== As leader ===
- Aardvark Poses (Sunnyside, 1995)
- Glub Glub Vol. 11 (Sunnyside, 1997)
- Slow (Sunnyside, 2002)
- The Suzy Lattimore EP (self-released, 2005)
- The Ballad of Minton Quigley (self-released, 2006)
- Hotel Music (St. Ives, 2008)
- Seahorse & the Storyteller (Truth and Soul, 2010)
- The Painted Lady Suite (Sunnyside, 2018)
- Suite Extracts Vol. 1 (Sunnyside, 2019)
- The Normyn Suites (Sunnyside, 2022)

With JSWISS

- The Alchemy EP (self-released, 2021)
- Bona Fide (self-released, 2022)

=== As sideman or guest ===
With Vinicius Cantuaria

- Sol Na Cara (Gramavision, 1996)
- Tucuma (Verve, 1998)
- Vinicius (Transparent, 2001)
- Horse and Fish (Rykodisc, 2004)
- Cymbals (Naive, 2007)

With Jay Leonhart

- The Double Cross (Sunnyside, 1988)
- Galaxies and Planets (Sons of Sound, 2001)
- Rodgers & Leonhart (Sons of Sound, 2002)

With others

- Aloe Blacc, Good Things (Stones Throw 2010)
- Blonde Redhead, 3 O'Clock (Ponderosa, 2017)
- Paul Brill, Breezy (Scarlet Shame, 2011)
- Cibo Matto, Hotel Valentine (Chimera, 2014)
- Peter Cincotti, Long Way from Home (2017)
- Nels Cline, Lovers (2016)
- El Michels Affair, Sounding Out the City (Fastlife, 2005)
- El Michels Affair, Enter the 37th Chamber (Fat Beats, 2009)
- Donald Fagen, Sunken Condos (Reprise, 2012)
- Lee Fields, My World (Truth & Soul, 2009)
- Lee Fields, Faithful Man (Truth & Soul, 2012)
- The Ghost of a Saber Tooth Tiger, La Carotte Bleue (Chimera, 2011)
- The Hold Steady, Thrashing Thru the Passion (Frenchkiss, 2019)
- Yuka Honda, Heart Chamber Phantoms (Tzadik, 2010)
- Per Husby, If You Could See Me Now (Gemini, 1996)
- Sharon Jones & the Dap-Kings, I Learned the Hard Way (Daptone, 2010)
- Shawn Lee, World of Funk (Ubiquity, 2011)
- Jens Lekman, An Argument with Myself (Secretly Canadian, 2011)
- Arto Lindsay, Prize (Righteous Babe, 1999)
- Michael McDonald, Wide Open (BMG, 2017)
- Natalie Merchant, Leave Your Sleep (Nonesuch, 2010)
- Tom Odell, Jubilee Road (Columbia, 2018)
- Mauro Refosco, Seven Waves (MA, 1999)
- Mark Ronson, Uptown Special (Columbia, 2015)
- Ben Sidran, Dylan Different (Microcoscmo Dischi, 2009)
- Leo Sidran, Cool School (Bonsai Music, 2018)
- Alice Smith, For Lovers, Dreamers & Me (BBE 2006)
- Sharleen Spiteri, Melody (Mercury, 2008)
- Steely Dan, Two Against Nature (Reprise, 2000)
- Steely Dan, Everything Must Go (Reprise, 2003)
- They Might Be Giants, Here Comes Science (Disney Sound/Idlewild, 2009)
- Steve Tyrell, This Guy's in Love (Columbia, 2003)
- Sachal Vasandani, Slow Motion Miracles (Okeh, 2015)
- Martha Wainwright, Come Home to Mama (Cooperative, 2012)
- Rufus Wainwright, Out of the Game (Decca, 2012)
- Walt Weiskopf, Day in Night Out (Criss Cross, 2008)
- The Whitefield Brothers, In the Raw (Now-Again, 2009)
- Nikki Yanofsky, Nikki (Decca, 2010)
- Geoff Zanelli and Mark Ronson, Mortdecai (La-La Land, 2015)
- St. Vincent, …At The Holiday Party (Daddy's Home, 2020)
