= Swing Shift (album) =

Studio album by Rik Emmett
- Released: December 11, 1997
- Recorded: 1997
- Genres: Pop, rock
- Length: 45:13
- Label: Open House
- Producer: Rik Emmett

Rik Emmett chronology
Ten Invitations From The Mistress Of Mr. E (1997)	Swing Shift (1997)	Raw Quartet (1999)

Swing Shift is the fifth studio album by the Canadian guitarist Rik Emmett, released in 1997. It is the second installment in the guitar trilogy, released merely six months after Ten Invitations from the Mistress of Mr. E, which was the beginning of the trilogy that is meant to cover the basis of Emmett's guitar teaching.

Professional ratings
Review scores
Source	Rating
Allmusic	4/5 stars

== Track listing ==
All tracks are written by Rik Emmett.

No.	Title	Length
1.	"Taste of Steel"	2:19
2.	"Way Cool"	3:49
3.	"Swing Shift"	3:42
4.	"Three Clouds Across the Moon"	5:45
5.	"Santa Fe Horizon"	5:47
6.	"Swizzle Stick"	4:19
7.	"Gladhands"	1:28
8.	"One Look"	4:30
9.	"Key Chain"	3:37
10.	"Veronica's Blue Waltz"	5:15
11.	"Mr. Bebop"	1:54
12.	"A Theory of Relativity"	2:42
Total length:		45:13

== Personnel ==
- Rik Emmett – guitars, synthesizers, vocals
- Steve Skingley – bass
- Denton Young – drums
- Randy Cooke – percussion
- Marty Anderson – keyboards

== Production ==
- Rik Emmett producer
- Tony Daniels engineer
