= Drew Zingg =

American jazz musician (1957–2025)

Jonathan Drew Zingg (November 14, 1957 – April 7, 2025) was an American guitarist who played rock, blues, soul and jazz. He is best known for performing with Steely Dan and Boz Scaggs.

== Life and career ==
Zingg was born and raised in New York City, the son of David Drew Zingg. After picking up the guitar around the age of 8, he formed his first musical group christened “The Ineffable Blanket” while attending the Buckley School. While attending the Loomis School in Windsor, CT, he played lead guitar for Lester and The Molesters. At Vassar College, he was in several bands including The Cubists who performed with square boxes on their heads. After graduation, Drew spent more than a decade on the New York club scene, at times backing Shawn Colvin and Lucy Kaplansky. He also did some Broadway production and session work. Eventually, Zingg started playing in a band headed by keyboard player and vocalist Jeff Young. In 1989, Donald Fagen signed up Young and his band, which included Zingg, initially as the rhythm section for what eventually became Fagen's (along with his future wife Libby Titus) New York Rock and Soul Revue. Zingg can be heard on the 1991 album The New York Rock and Soul Revue: Live at the Beacon, which also features Michael McDonald, Phoebe Snow, and Boz Scaggs, among others. His soloing is featured on “Green Flower Street”, “Drowning In The Sea Of Love”, “Chain Lightning”, “Minute By Minute”, and “Pretzel Logic”. The New York Rock and Soul gigs led to Walter Becker coming to New York and joining the Revue in the summer of 1992. Then, in 1993, Fagen and Becker decided to hit the road, touring as Steely Dan, with Zingg joining them on the tour as a lead guitarist and music director for the nationwide summer tour and the subsequent spring tour of Japan. Others joining this "Steely Dan Orchestra" were Warren Bernhardt on keyboards, Peter Erskine on drums, and Tom Barney on bass. In 1995, Steely Dan released a live album entitled Alive in America that was recorded during the 1993-1994 tours, with Zingg soloing on "Green Earrings" and "Third World Man".

In 1993, to coincide with the release of Fagen’s second solo album “Kamakiriad”, several CD singles were released. The CDs included remix versions of album tracks plus a live version of “Home At Last”, taken from the Rock And Soul Revue gigs, as well as a previously unreleased studio track “Confide In Me”. Both performances feature prominent solos by Zingg.

In 1996, Zingg started touring with Boz Scaggs. He can be heard on Boz's 2004 release Greatest Hits Live. He also toured or recorded with Marcus Miller, Rickie Lee Jones, David Sanborn, Gladys Knight, Alana Davis, and Patti Austin.

Zingg went into the studio and recorded his first album, the self-titled Drew Zingg, released in 2012. It was produced and engineered by George Walker Petit, and recorded in multiple studios in New York City and California. Guest vocalists Michael McDonald and Boz Scaggs lend support, and the album includes the talents of George Whitty, Will Lee, and Vinnie Colaiuta. The album includes a composition by Donald Fagen and Walter Becker entitled "Megashine City", which is an instrumental arrangement of an unreleased Steely Dan song also known as "Talkin' 'Bout My Home". Zingg and band also cover the Lionel Richie tune "Easy". The album received fine reviews.

Zingg died in San Francisco, CA. on April 7, 2025, at the age of 67.

== Discography ==
- Drew Zingg (The Infrangibile Syndicate, 2012)

=== As sideman ===
With Lucy Kaplansky

- The Tide (1994)
- Flesh and Bone (1996)

With Monkey House

- Headquarters (2012)
- Left (2016)
- Friday (2019)
- Remember The Audio (2022)
- Crashbox (2025)

With Steely Dan

- The New York Rock and Soul Revue: Live at the Beacon – (1991)
- Alive in America (1995)

With others

- Lili Añel, Hi-Octane Coffee (2001)
- Alana Davis, Blame It on Me (1997)
- Adam Holzman, Overdrive (1994)
- Michael McDonald, The Voice of Michael McDonald (2001)
- Marcus Miller, Live & More (1998)
- Nelson Rangell, Nelson Rangell (1990)
- Boz Scaggs, My Time: A Boz Scaggs Anthology (1997)
