= Strung-Out Troubadours =

- Genres: Classical, Flamenco, Jazz, Blues
- Years active: 2006–present
- Members: Rik Emmett; Dave Dunlop

Strung-Out Troubadours is the musical duo of Rik Emmett (of Canadian rock band Triumph) and Dave Dunlop. The pair regularly perform live shows together. Most of the songs are performed on acoustic guitars without vocals, with Emmett singing lead vocal on some selections.

== History ==
Emmett and Dunlop have played together since they met while both teaching at the National Summer Guitar Workshop in 1990. Dunlop began making appearances at Emmett's concerts, and the pair later began recording as a duo. In 2006 they released the album Strung-Out Troubadours, and began performing under that name. Later that year they released a recording of their live concert at Hugh's Room in Toronto.

In 2007, Strung-Out Troubadours won "Album of the Year" and "Group/Duo of the Year" at the Canadian Smooth Jazz Awards where they were the most heavily nominated act. Both Emmett and Dunlop were also nominated for "Best Guitarist".

The third album, titled Push & Pull was released in May 2009, and in 2011 the pair released an album ReCOVERy Room9. Unlike their previous albums, this one included mainly cover tunes. They also releases an album of live acoustic recordings of Triumph material, Then Again, under the names of the two musicians.

As of 2015, Emmett and Dunlop continue to perform together in Canada and the US and to sell remastered copies of The Strung-Out Troubadours recordings.

== Discography ==
=== Studio albums ===
- Strung-Out Troubadours (2006)
- Push & Pull (2009)
- reCOVERy room 9 (2011)

=== Live albums ===
- Live at Hugh's Room (2007)
