= Lili Añel =

American singer-songwriter

- Born: Eulalia Añel; New York City, U.S.
- Genres: Jazz, soul, folk, rock
- Occupation: Musician
- Years active: 1994–present
- Label: Palmetto
- Website: www.lilianel.org

Lili Añel (nee Eulalia Añel) is an American singer-songwriter and performing artist from New York City. She was born in El Barrio, Spanish Harlem and raised in the South Bronx. She moved to Philadelphia, Pennsylvania, in 2004. She performed locally and on the local NPR station. The single "Supposed to Be" from Every Second in Between was listed in USA Today's Playlist on September 15, 2009, by Steve Jones.

Añel was accepted into the Leonard Davis Center of Performing Arts at City College of the City University of New York. She later studied with legendary jazz singer Shelia Jordan for one year in her vocal performance workshop. She enrolled in Eddie Simon's Guitar Study Center. Only able to afford to pay for one class, she audited as many classes as possible. Gaining the respect from the instructors, who admired her diligence, she was often allowed to participate in class like the students who were fully enrolled. During her time at Guitar Study Center, she attended open-mike nights in Greenwich Village. She began to get gigs and subsequently put a band together. She continued performing, building a following which eventually took her to recording her first CD, Laughed Last in 1994 on Palmetto Records.

== Recordings ==
In 1994, Añel signed with Palmetto Records, which released her debut CD, Laughed Last. It was met with rave reviews as well as airplay on AAA stations across the United States, in particular in New York.

In 2002, Añel recorded Hi-Octane Coffee, which was produced by J.B. Moore and featured Drew Zingg (Steely Dan, Alana Davis, Gladys Knight), Frank Vilardi (Donny Osmond, Jill Sobule, The Bacon Brothers), Seth Glassman (James Brown, Paul McCartney, Maceo Parker, Carol King) and Johnny Gale (co-producer Ryan Shaw "This is Ryan Shaw"). This union provided the opportunity for Añel's songs to shine, showcasing her music in all its diversity, from the funk of "The Way Out" to the Americana-Country tinged "Nothing in Common" to the folk-acoustic guitar-vocal "Zora". Hi-Octane Coffee received excellent press, continuing to raise Añel's profile within the industry.

In January 2007, Añel released her third CD entitled Dream Again (Wall-I Records/Quarry Hill Studios). Dream Again marks Añel's first recording as co-producer. She was joined by bassist Cooke Harvey. JazzTimes magazine said: "...part soul sister, part jazz chanteuse and pure dynamite...her songs are consistently excellent...". This is Añel's first international recording on the German label. It was released 10/10/08 throughout Europe and Japan. It was embraced by the European media including Hit Meister and MusicLetter.

On her fifth release, Every Second In Between (Wall-I Records), Añel wanted to continue depicting her love of songwriting, singing and interpretation, but at a whole new level. Enter Producer, four-time Grammy winner, Glenn Barratt. Every Second In Between, released 9/30/09, is a collaboration of heart, soul, words, music, spirit and technique. The songs' landscapes accurately capture Añel, bringing her voice to the forefront, from the classically tinged Voyager, with its string quartet and Añel's voice, alone and in chorus, to her cover of Nina Simone's That's All I Want From You, and the Latin flavored Supposed To Be, the album's first single, a song of empowerment with the storyteller's refusal to give up sense of self.

In his review of Every Second In Between, Ken Franckling stated his favorite songs on the album were "All 11 Tracks". USA Today 's music critic Steve Jones highlights Añel's song "Supposed to Be" as one of 10 interesting songs he found during the week of September 15, 2009.

On her sixth CD, I Can See Bliss From Here (Wall-I Records), released September 17, 2013, Añel was a co-producer and teamed up with Dale Melton, a friend and fellow musician who'd played in her rhythm section for over a year.

== Discography ==
- 1994: Laughed Last
- 2001: Hi-Octane Coffee
- 2006: Laughed Last (Reissue with bonus tracks) (Palmetto)
- 2007: Dream Again
- 2008: Life or Death
- 2009: Every Second In Between
- 2013: I Can See Bliss From Here
- 2017: Another Place, Another Time
- 2018: In Spirit
- 2019: Better Days
- 2021: Better Days (Re-mastered)
- 2025: You Have A Visitor
