= Headquarters, Nebraska =

- Ghost Town
- Location within Nebraska
- Coordinates: 41.95°N 98.5°W
- Country: United States
- State: Nebraska
- County: Wheeler

Headquarters is a ghost town in Wheeler County, Nebraska, United States.

== History ==
A post office was established at Headquarters in 1908, and remained in operation until it was discontinued in 1917.
