= Hi-Octane Coffee =

Studio album by Lili Añel
- Released: 2001
- Recorded: Mirror Image and Dubway Studios New York, NY
- Genre: Rock
- Length: 49:39
- Label: Original JB Music
- Producer: J.B. Moore

Professional ratings
Review scores
Source	Rating
Long Island Press	9/10 stars

Hi-Octane Coffee is the second album by American singer-songwriter Lili Añel released in 2001 on Original JB Music.

Añel performing in 2001 at the Bottom Line in New York in support of Hi-Octane Coffee

== Track listing ==
All compositions by Lili Añel.

1. "The Way Out" – 3:50
2. "No Matter What Love" – 4:36
3. "Lay-Down Play Dead" – 4:39
4. "Down By The Water" – 2:48
5. "Nothing In Common" – 3:27
6. "See My Way" – 4:10
7. "Not A Tear" – 3:35
8. "Thin Line" – 4:03
9. "Won’t You Stay" – 4:19
10. "2 Much Better" – 4:46
11. "If" – 5:27
12. "Zora" – 3:54

== Personnel ==
Musicians

- Lili Añel — Vocals, guitars, percussion
- Drew Zingg — electric & acoustic guitars
- Andy Burton – Hammond
- Johnny Gale – electric guitar
- Seth Glassman – bass
- Frank Vilardi — drums, percussion
- J.B. Moore —piano on “If”
- John Ward —percussion on “If”

Engineers

- Rick Kerr
- Julio Peña on “No Matter What Love”
- Mastered by Danny Wyatt at Temple of Soul, NYC
