= Don Breithaupt =

Canadian musician

Don Breithaupt (born April 8, 1961) is a Canadian pianist, singer/songwriter, composer, arranger, producer and author.

He received his musical education at Berklee College of Music in Boston, where he studied Jazz Composition and Arranging, and his literary education at Queen's University in Kingston, Ontario, Canada, receiving a B.A. (Honours) in English and Film Studies.

== Early life ==
Born in Sault Ste. Marie, Ontario, Breithaupt was raised in Mississauga, Ontario, (a western suburb of Toronto) in a musical household. His father was a jazz piano enthusiast, and his mother was an accomplished classical soprano and choir director, so music was heard regularly in the home.

His parents took him and his two younger brothers, who were also musically inclined, to concerts and bought them records. Breithaupt started taking piano lessons at a young age, but he discontinued the lessons at age eight. He took up the piano again at age twelve, at a time when Elton John, Billy Joel, and other piano-based pop artists were becoming radio staples.

He played the drums in rock bands during his high school years, but never abandoned the piano. Songwriting became his strongest interest. As an English/Film undergraduate at Queen's University in nearby Kingston, Ontario, Breithaupt spent much of his spare time at Harrison-LeCaine Hall, practicing piano, writing songs, and teaching himself the craft of arranging. He immersed himself in jazz: the Pat Metheny Group, Weather Report, and several of the pianists he had first heard as a child: Bill Evans, Oscar Peterson, and Dave Brubeck.

In 1983, upon completion of his bachelor's degree, Breithaupt was awarded a full scholarship to Berklee College of Music by the Frederick Harris Music Company.

== Career ==
As a songwriter, his work has been covered by artists including Alfie Zappacosta, Marc Jordan, Dione Taylor, Sarah Slean, Denzal Sinclaire, Patricia O'Callaghan, Wendy Lands, and Chris Smith. He has co-written three songs nominated for Juno Awards (the Canadian Grammys), and has twice been a co-winner (along with his brother Jeff) in both the American Songwriting Competition, and the International Songwriting Competition.

As a musician, he has performed with the Kim Mitchell Band, Rik Emmett, and Sass Jordan, and he leads his own group, Monkey House. Breithaupt recorded an album in 2006 of his own original piano compositions (with cello and acoustic guitar accompaniment) entitled Breathing Space, re-released as part of a multiple CD set called Peace: Music for Relaxation. Don and his brother Jeff, a lyricist, have also made a mark in Toronto and New York City as The Breithaupt Brothers, writing classic songbook-style compositions that they recorded with vocalists, including Ron Sexsmith, Emilie-Claire Barlow, Ian Thomas, Sarah Slean, on the album Just Passing Through: The Breithaupt Brothers Songbook Vol. II, which was released in September 2014.

In 2015, Breithaupt commenced working as the producer with singer Eleanor McCain on a musical project to help celebrate Canada's 150th birthday. The album was released on May 12, 2017, entitled True North: The Canadian Songbook. The album has 32 songs and features 12 arrangers, 28 guest artists, and 10 Canadian Symphony Orchestras.

As an author, Breithaupt has written on music and film, including articles for the National Post, a Canadian English language newspaper. His books include Precious and Few: Pop Music in the Early '70s, and Night Moves: Pop Music in the Late '70s, which were both co-written by his brother Jeff, and Steely Dan’s Aja, Vol. 46 of Continuum Publishing's 33 1/3 series of books about albums, which was published in 2007.

His work in film and television has brought him SOCAN Awards for Domestic Animated Television Series music and International Television Series music. As a TV music composer, Breithaupt's credits include writing music (along with Anthony Vanderburgh) for 72 episodes of the animated sitcom called 6teen, from 2004-2010. In 2009, the duo won a Daytime Emmy Award for Outstanding Original Song for their theme to this series. Breithaupt also wrote music for 25 episodes of the teen sitcom Really Me from 2011-2013, as well as for the reality television series called Pawn Stars, from 2013-2015.

== Personal life ==
Breithaupt married Rikki Rumball, a singer/songwriter, in 1988. They played together in various projects together as musicians, including Rikki Rumball's 1996 album Strange Girl, and her 2007 album Divine Blue. For both albums, Breithaupt was producer and arranger, played keyboards, and wrote or co-wrote most of the songs. Ms. Rumball sang backup vocals on Breithaupt's Monkey House albums Welcome to the Club, True North, and Headquarters.
