= Rik Emmett =

Canadian vocalist and guitarist (born 1953)

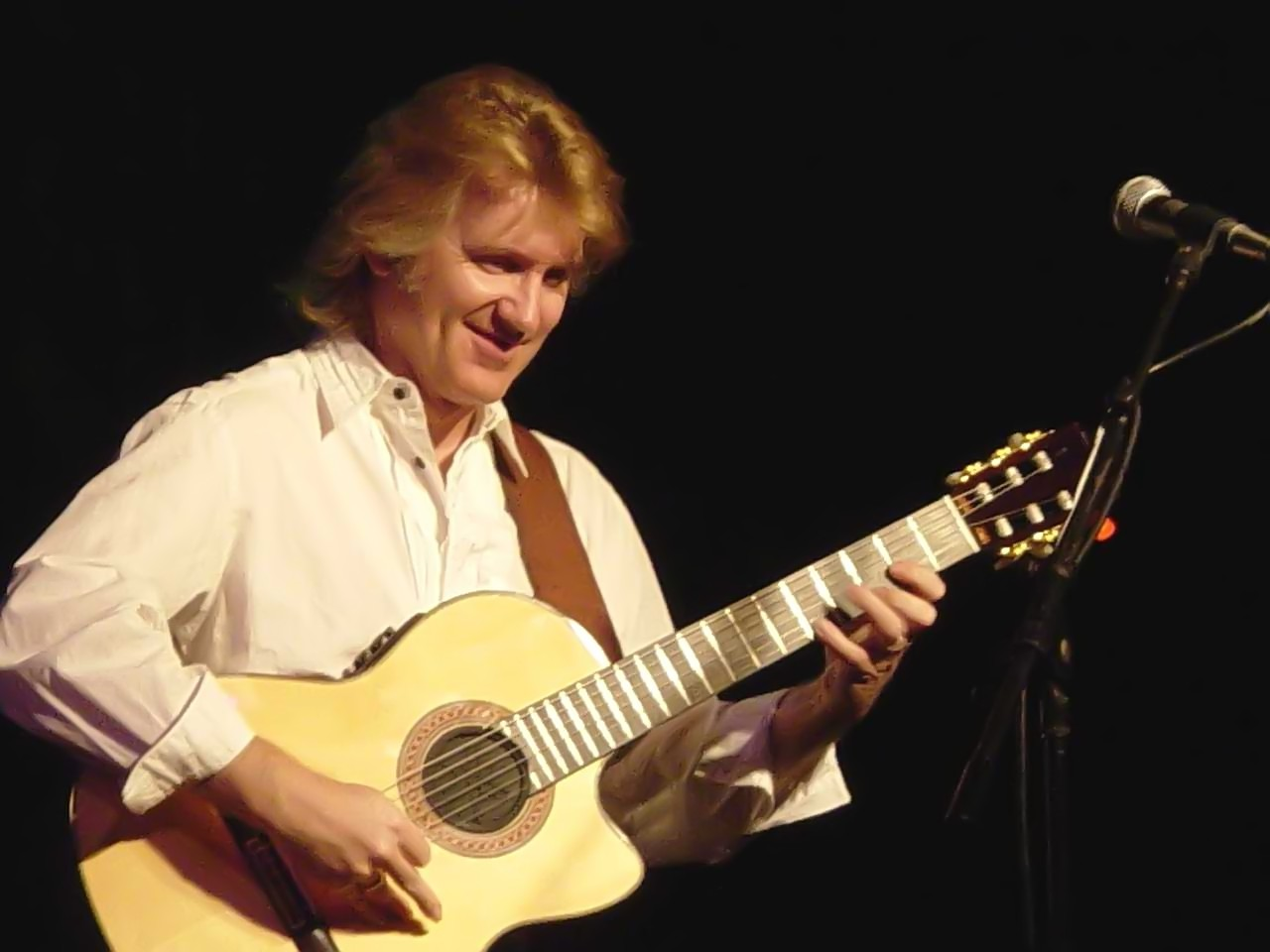
- Rik Emmett playing at The Coach House in San Juan Capistrano, 2002

Background information
- Born: Richard Gordon Emmett; July 10, 1953 (age 73); Toronto, Ontario, Canada
- Genres: Rock; hard rock; progressive rock; heavy metal
- Occupations: Musician; songwriter; record producer
- Instruments: Guitar, vocals, synthesizer, piano, bass guitar
- Years active: 1975–present
- Labels: MCA; Universal; Rockit Sounds; Attic; Duke Street; Fontana North
- Website: rikemmett.com

Richard Gordon Emmett (born July 10, 1953) is a Canadian vocalist, guitarist, and member of the hard rock band Triumph.

== Career ==
Emmett played guitar on the self titled debut album by Glam rock singer Justin Paige which was released in Canada by Capitol Records in 1974.

He also was a member of the Toronto progressive rock group Act III, but left to join Triumph in the summer of 1975. This led to the break up of Act III. Other members of this group formed Zon. Emmett says that one of the songs he performed with Act III was "The Blinding Light Show", a tune he later recorded with Triumph.

Emmett left Triumph in 1988 to pursue a solo career. His first solo album, Absolutely, was released in 1990 and became a moderate hit across the United States and Canada thanks to the hits "When a Heart Breaks," "Big Lie" and "Saved by Love". He is also a writer for Guitar Player magazine and teaches song-writing and music business at Humber College in Toronto. For a time during the 1980s, Emmett contributed cartoons to Hit Parader magazine satirizing the music industry.

Due to a production error by Gil Moore and Mike Levine on Triumph's first album, Emmett changed the spelling of his first name to "Rik" rather than have the album recalled or cause confusion with fans.

Although he is best known as a rock guitarist, his playing style incorporates rock, blues, jazz, classical, bluegrass, and flamenco techniques. Similarly, his songwriting and discography demonstrate his ability to employ and blend multiple genres. In April 2005, he won the Canadian Smooth Jazz Award for Guitarist of the Year.

Emmett is also a proficient singer, splitting lead vocal duties of Triumph with Gil Moore. Emmett's voice also has a noticeable resemblance to that of Geddy Lee of Canadian progressive rock band Rush, leading to the band's sound sometimes being compared to that of Rush.

In 2007, Emmett joined former Triumph bandmates Gil Moore and Mike Levine for their induction into the Canadian Music Industry Hall of Fame. On Sunday April 6, 2008, at The 2008 JUNO Awards, Triumph was inducted into the Canadian Music Hall of Fame by the Canadian Academy of Recording Arts and Sciences (CARAS).

As a result of positive audience response to their dual guitar work in live shows, Emmett and guitarist Dave Dunlop formed the duo Strung-Out Troubadours. In 2007, they won 'Album of the Year' and 'Group/Duo of the Year' at the Canadian Smooth Jazz Awards, where they were the most heavily nominated act. Both were also nominated for 'Best Guitarist'.

Emmett's 2018 tour with Dunlop may prove to be his last, citing an interest in retirement, or at least an extended break.

Emmett revealed that he is being treated for prostate cancer in 2024. He also has developed arthritis in his hands.

Starting in April 2026 Emmett joined fellow Triumph bandmates Gil Moore and Mike Levine along with Phil X, Todd Kerns and Brent Fitz to kick off Triumph's 50th anniversary tour "The Rock & Roll Machine Reloaded" tour.

== Discography ==
=== Solo albums ===
- Absolutely (1990)
- Ipso Facto (1992)
- The Spiral Notebook (1995)
- Ten Invitations from the Mistress of Mr. E. (1997)
- Swing Shift (1997)
- Raw Quartet (1999)
- Handiwork (2002)
- Good Faith (2003)
- Then Again: Acoustic Selections from the Triumph Catalogue (2012)
- Marco's Secret Songbook (2012)

=== Extended Plays ===
- "Folk Songs for the Farewell Bonfire" / "Bonfire Sessions" (2020)
- Six String Sketches (2025)
- Measured Moments (2025)

=== Live albums ===
- Rik Emmett LIVE at Berklee (2000)
- ‘’Live at Hugh’s Room’’ (2007)

=== DVDs ===
- One Night in Cinci (2005)
- Live at 10 Gigs (2005)

=== with Triumph ===
- Triumph (1976)
- Rock & Roll Machine (1977)
- Just a Game (1979)
- Progressions of Power (1980)
- Allied Forces (1981)
- Never Surrender (1982)
- Thunder Seven (1984)
- The Sport of Kings (1986)
- Surveillance (1987)

=== with Sam Reid ===
- The Spirit of Christmas (1999)

=== with Strung-Out Troubadours ===
- Strung-Out Troubadours (2006)
- Push & Pull (2009)
- reCOVERy room 9 (2011)

=== with Airtime ===
- Liberty Manifesto (2007)

=== with Pavlo and Oscar Lopez ===
- Trifecta (2009)

=== with RESolution9 ===
- RES9 (2016)

=== Solo singles ===
Title	Release	Peak chart positions	Album
Title	Release	CAN	Album
"Big Lie"	1990	47	Absolutely
"When a Heart Breaks"	1990	14	Absolutely
"Saved by Love"	1991	17	Absolutely
"World of Wonder"	1991	22	Absolutely
"The Way That You Love Me"	1991	76	Absolutely
"Bang On"	1992	48	Ipso Facto
"Dig a Little Deeper"	1992	66	Ipso Facto
"Heaven in Your Heart"	1993	44	Ipso Facto
"Let Me be the One"	1995	31	The Spiral Notebook

=== Soundtrack appearances ===
- "Saved by Love" (from Problem Child 2) (1991)

== See also ==
- Pavlo
- Oscar Lopez
