= Randy Cooke =

Canadian musician

- Born: Toronto, Ontario, Canada
- Origin: Canada; United States
- Genres: Indie rock; pop rock
- Years active: 1987–present
- Member of: Smash Mouth
- Website: https://www.youtube.com/@randycookedrums

Randy Cooke is a Canadian-American drummer, percussionist, session musician, and touring musician.

== Biography ==
Influenced by his drummer father, Cooke picked up the drums as a child, learning and playing as part of a local drum corps before starting his own bands as a teenager. After high school, he took his talents to the recording studio and the national stage, recording and/or touring with the likes of FM, Lee Aaron, Strange Advance, Marc Jordan, Rik Emmett, Amy Sky, Sass Jordan, Kim Mitchell, Edwin, Alannah Myles, and Alanis Morissette, and quickly emerged as one of Canada's top session musicians.

In 2004, Cooke relocated to Los Angeles and has since worked with some of music's biggest names. Shortly after his move, he was selected to record and tour with Dave Stewart of Eurythmics. Impressed, Stewart recommended Cooke to Ringo Starr, who was looking for a band to back him up as he began the promotional circuit for his solo album, Liverpool 8. Cooke got the spot and would accompany Starr on drums on The Rachel Ray Show and at the European Capital Of Culture Celebration, among other major appearances. Since moving to the US, he has also toured and/or recorded with Five for Fighting, Kelly Clarkson, Hilary Duff, Smash Mouth, Natasha Bedingfield, Ian Gillan (of Deep Purple), Colin Hay (of Men at Work), Pointer Sisters, Colbie Caillat, Mick Jagger, Ashley Tisdale, David Archuleta, The Veronicas, K'naan, Mandy Moore, and Taylor Hicks. He has also appeared on Jay Leno, David Letterman, Regis & Kelly, A&E Private Sessions, Larry King, CBS Early Show, The View, and Martha Stewart, endorsed a brand of signature "Randy Cooke" drumsticks available at retail for leading manufacturer Regal Tip, and been featured as a drummer/percussionist on several major releases.

== Credits ==
Year	Artist	Album	Contribution
1997	The Miller Stain Limit	Radiate	Drums
2004	Kelly Clarkson	Breakaway	Drums
2005	Len	The Diary of the Madmen	Drums
2006	Chantal Kreviazuk	Ghost Stories	Drums, Percussion
2006	Stacie Orrico	Beautiful Awakening	Drums
2007	Ashley Tisdale	Headstrong	Drums
2007	Five for Fighting	Live: Back Country	Drums
2008	David Archuleta	David Archuleta	Drums
2009	K'naan	Troubadour	Drums
2009	Chantal Kreviazuk	Plain Jane	Drums, percussion
2009	Five for Fighting	Slice	Drums
2009	Jesse & Joy	Electricidad	Drums, percussion
2010	David Archuleta	Other Side of Down	Drums
2011	Kelly Clarkson	Stronger	Drums
