= Call of the Wild (Lee Aaron album) =

- Cover art by Hugh Syme

Studio album by Lee Aaron
- Released: June 27, 1985
- Studios: Phase One, Toronto
- Genres: Hard rock, heavy metal
- Length: 41:04
- Label: Attic
- Producer: Paul Gross

Lee Aaron chronology
Metal Queen (1984)	Call of the Wild (1985)	Lee Aaron (1987)

Singles from Call of the Wild
- 1. "Rock Me All Over" Released: April 1985; 2. "Runnin' from the Fire" Released: June 10, 1985; 3. "Barely Holdin' On" Released: August 8, 1985

Call of the Wild is the third studio album by singer Lee Aaron, released on June 27, 1985 through Attic Records; a remastered edition was reissued in 2002 through Unidisc Music. The album reached #86 on the RPM Canadian Albums Chart on August 24, 1985 and remained on the chart for twelve weeks. The title track was included on a 1988 reissue but not on the original release. It was, however, included on the B-side of the 12-inch single of "Barely Holdin' On".

== Track listing ==
No.	Title	Writer(s)	Length
1.	"Rock Me All Over"	Lee Aaron, John Albani	3:57
2.	"Runnin' from the Fire"	Aaron, Albani	3:00
3.	"Champion"	Aaron, Albani	4:17
4.	"Barely Holdin' On" (Silver Condor cover)	Joe Cerisano	4:42
5.	"Burnin' Love" (Spider cover)	Amanda Blue, Holly Knight	3:44
6.	"Call of the Wild" (CD edition bonus track)	Aaron, Albani	4:24
7.	"Line of Fire"	Marc Ribler, Bob Halligan Jr.	4:24
8.	"Beat 'em Up"	Halligan Jr.	3:04
9.	"Paradise"	Aaron, Albani, Dick Wagner	3:26
10.	"Evil Game"	Aaron, Albani, Wagner	3:52
11.	"Danger Zone"	Aaron, Albani	3:11
12.	"Hot to Be Rocked"	Simon Brierley, Aaron, Wagner	3:27
Total length:			41:04

== Personnel ==
- Lee Aaron – lead vocals, backing vocals
- John Albani – guitar, backing vocals
- Simon Brierley – guitar
- Bob Ezrin – keyboard, percussion, executive producer
- Jerry Mercer – drums
- Spider Sinnaeve – bass
- Chris Brockway – backing vocals
- Walter Zwolinski – backing vocals
- Dick Wagner – backing vocals
- Lenny DeRose – engineering, mixing
- Mick Walsh – engineering
- Kevin Markland – engineering
- Wayne O' Brien – engineering
- Randy Staub – engineering
- Paul Gross – producer

== Chart performance ==
Year	Chart	Position
1985	RPM Top 100 Albums	86
