= Best Of: Self-Destruction =

Best Of Moxy: Self-Destruction

Greatest hits album by Moxy
- Released: June 1993
- Recorded: 1974–1977
- Genres: Hard rock; heavy metal
- Label: Pacemaker Records
- Producer: Moxy

Moxy chronology
A Tribute to Buzz Shearman (1984)	Best Of Moxy: Self-Destruction (1993)	Moxy V (2000)

Professional ratings
Review scores
Source	Rating
Allmusic	3/5 stars

Best Of: Self-Destruction is a compilation album by the Canadian rock group Moxy in the band's original incarnation with Buzz Shearman, Earl Johnson, Buddy Caine, Bill Wade and Terry Juric, released in 1993. There are two distinct versions of the album, with the original release having one song, "Take It or Leave It" added to the track listing. The album also featured The Buddy Caine Band song "Feed The Fire", written in tribute to Shearman by Buddy Caine.

There are three versions of the Pacemaker CD. One that has black and white graphics, plus a plain red CD. This was only available in San Antonio on release day. Second, the standard EX version, and lastly a Canadian one that added the track "Take It Or Leave It"

== Credits ==
- Buzz Shearman: vocals
- Earl Johnson: guitar
- Buddy Caine: guitar
- Bill Wade: drums
- Terry Juric: bass
- Tommy Bolin: guitar (solo only)
- Jack Douglas
- Mark Smith

== Track listing ==
1. Can't You See I'm a Star - 3:36 - From Moxy I - (1975)
2. Out of the Darkness - 4:50 - From Moxy I - (1975) *
3. Sail On Sail Away - 4:52 - From Moxy I - (1975)
4. Fantasy - 5:40 - From Moxy I - (1975) *
5. Moon Rider - 4:25 - From Moxy I - (1975) *
6. Cause There's Another - 3:43 - From Moxy II - (1976)
7. Change in My Life - 4:37 - From Moxy II - (1976)
8. Tryin' Just for You - 4:28 - From Moxy II - (1976)
9. Wet Suit - 4:52 - From Moxy II - (1976)
10. Nothin' Comes Easy - 4:22 - From Ridin' High - (1977)
11. Sweet Reputation - 3:54 - From Ridin' High - (1977)
12. Ridin' High (Remix) - 4:03 - From Ridin' High - (1977)
13. Nothin' Comes Easy (Reprise) - 1:00 - From Ridin' High - (1977)
14. Trouble - 3:52 - From A Tribute to Buzz Shearman - (1984)
15. Feed the Fire - 5:05 - (The Buddy Caine Band) (Buddy Caine)
16. Take It or Leave It - 3:40 - From Moxy II - (1976) - (extra track on original version of album)

== Reissued ==
Moxy’s original catalogue of albums were again available starting in 1994 when Valerie Shearman ("Buzz" widow) oversaw the release of all of Moxy's back catalogue of albums.

- 1994 Self-Destruction: The Best of Moxy (Pacemaker) PACE-001
- 2022 Self-Destruction [LP reissue] (Unidisc) SPLP-7326
