= A Tribute to Buzz Shearman =

Compilation album by Moxy
- Released: June 1984
- Recorded: 1974 – 1977
- Genres: Hard rock; heavy metal
- Labels: Pacemaker Records; Ahed
- Producers: Moxy, Jack Douglas, Mark Smith

Moxy chronology
Under the Lights (1978)	A Tribute to Buzz Shearman (1984)	Best Of: Self-Destruction (1993)

Tribute To Buzz Shearman
- Original 1984 Album Cover

A Tribute to Buzz Shearman is a compilation/tribute album by the Canadian rock group Moxy in the band's original incarnation with Buzz Shearman, Earl Johnson, Buddy Caine, Bill Wade and Terry Juric. The album is a tribute to Moxy vocalist Buzz Shearman (who died in a motorbike accident in 1983) from his wife Valerie. She was an executive with the indie label Ahed Records of Canada and released the album. The album collects some of the band's best-known and three previously unreleased songs called "Trouble", "Eyeballs" and "Highway" with Shearman on vocals. There is a testimonial by San Antonio disc jockey Joe Anthony on the back cover of the album about Shearman's music being his legacy after a short life. There are two distinct versions of the album cover, one in 1984 and the second on CD in 1994.

== Credits ==
- Buzz Shearman: vocals
- Earl Johnson: guitar
- Buddy Caine: guitar
- Bill Wade: drums
- Terry Juric: bass
- Tommy Bolin: guitar solo on "Train"
- Jack Douglas: producer
- Valerie Shearman: producer
- Mark Smith: producer

== Tracks ==
Trouble (1984)
"Trouble " From 1984 Album A Tribute to Buzz Shearman, By Buzz Shearman

1. Sail on Sail Away – 4:52 – From Moxy I (1975)
2. Can't You See I'm a Star – 3:36 – From Moxy I (1974)
3. Train – 4:37 – From Moxy I (1975)
4. Cause There's Another – 3:43 – From Moxy II (1976)
5. Trouble – 3:52 – Previously unreleased track (Buzz Shearman)
6. Change in My Life – 4:37 – From Moxy II (1976)
7. Eyeballs – 3:03 – Previously unreleased track (Johnnie Lovesin)
8. Sweet Reputation (Symphony for Margaret) – 3:54 – From Ridin' High (1977)
9. Highway – 4:12 – Previously unreleased track (Earl Johnson)
10. Riding High – 4:03 – From Ridin' High (1977)

== Singles ==
- 1983 Trouble/Take It Or Leave It (Ahed) AH-1009

== Reissued ==
Moxy’s original catalogue of albums were again available starting in 1994 when Valerie Shearman ("Buzz" widow) oversaw the release of all of Moxy's back catalogue of albums.

- 1984 Moxy: A Tribute To Buzz Shearman (Ahed) AS-8227
- 2022 Moxy: A Tribute To Buzz Shearman (Unidisc) AGEK-2245LP

== Testimonial ==
The back cover of the album features a testimonial from San Antonio's disc jockey known as the godfather of rock, Joe Anthony, who wrote : "Buzz had that special quality in his voice that carried a smile and a lift. He penetrated himself into the listeners and was very forceful with them. He gave a definite impression to the music. His passing was untimely, but he gave us so much in such a short span. His music is his legacy".
