= Some Girls Do (album) =

Studio album by Lee Aaron
- Released: September 23, 1991
- Studio: Sounds Interchange in Toronto, Ontario, Canada
- Genre: Hard rock
- Length: 53:33
- Label: Attic
- Producer: Brian Allen, John Albani

Lee Aaron chronology
Bodyrock (1989)	Some Girls Do (1991)	Emotional Rain (1994)

Singles from Some Girls Do
- 1. "Sex with Love" Released: September 9, 1991

Professional ratings
Review scores
Source	Rating
AllMusic	1.5/5 stars
Collector's Guide to Heavy Metal	0/10

Some Girls Do is the sixth studio album by singer Lee Aaron, released on September 23, 1991, through Attic Records. It reached No. 38 on the RPM Canadian Albums Chart on November 30, 1991, and held that position for a week. The only single, "Sex with Love", was almost a top-20 hit on The Record's single charts, peaking at number 21. It fared less so on the RPM chart, reaching number 55 on October 26, 1991, and holding that position for three weeks. The album would go on to receive a Juno Award nomination for Rock Album of the Year in 1992.

== Track listing ==
No.	Title	Writer(s)	Length
1.	"Some Girls Do"	Lee Aaron, John Albani	3:37
2.	"Crazy in Love"	Aaron, Albani	3:50
3.	"Hands Off the Merchandise"	Aaron, Albani, Marvin Birt	3:29
4.	"Wild at Heart"	Aaron, Albani, Stan Meissner	4:05
5.	"Sex with Love"	Aaron, Albani	4:42
6.	"(You Make Me) Wanna Be Bad"	Aaron, Albani, Andy Curran	3:53
7.	"Tuff Love"	Aaron, Albani	4:35
8.	"Motor City Boy"	Aaron, Albani	4:16
9.	"Love Crimes"	Aaron, Albani, Meissner	3:55
10.	"Can't Stand the Heat"	Aaron, Albani, Paul Sabu	3:44
11.	"Dangerous"	Aaron, Albani, Jim Vallance	3:37
12.	"Tell Me Something Good"	Stevie Wonder	4:39
13.	"Peace on Earth"	Aaron, Albani	5:11
Total length:			53:33

== Personnel ==
- Lee Aaron – vocals, background vocals
- John Albani – guitar, keyboard, background vocals, production
- Randy Cooke – drums
- Rob Laidlaw – bass, background vocals
- Lou Pomanti – organ
- Phil Naro – background vocals
- Andy Curran – background vocals
- Brian Allen – background vocals, production
- Harry Hess – background vocals
- John Derringer – spoken vocals
- Lenny DeRose – engineering, mixing
- Paula Anderson – engineering, mixing

== Charts ==
Year	Chart	Position
1991	RPM Top 100 Albums	38
