= Bodyrock (album) =

Studio album by Lee Aaron
- Released: September 13, 1989
- Studios: Phase One, Toronto
- Genre: Hard rock
- Length: 55:03
- Label: Attic
- Producers: Brian Allen, John Albani

Lee Aaron chronology
Lee Aaron (1987)	Bodyrock (1989)	Some Girls Do (1991)

Alternative cover
- Japanese edition

Singles from Bodyrock
- 1. "Whatcha Do to My Body" / "Tough Girls Don't Cry" / "Nasty Boyz" Released: August 16, 1989; 2. "Hands On" Released: November 9, 1989

Bodyrock is the fifth studio album by the Canadian rock singer Lee Aaron, released on September 13, 1989, through Attic Records (Europe and North America) and Alfa Records (Japan). The album is Aaron's most successful and highest-charting release to date, reaching No. 24 on the Canadian albums chart and No. 36 on the German albums chart. Both of its singles also charted: "Whatcha Do to My Body" reached No. 25 on the Canadian singles chart and "Hands On" reached No. 38.

The music video for "Whatcha Do to My Body" was nominated for Video of the Year at the 1990 Juno Awards, while Bodyrock itself was nominated for Album of the Year and Rock Album of the Year in 1991. Furthermore, recording engineer Lenny DeRose received a nomination for Recording Engineer of the Year in 1990 for his work on the album. In Canada, Bodyrock was certified Platinum on December 18, 1989.

== Critical reception ==
Bodyrock was included on Chart magazine's list of "20 most influential Canadian albums of the '80s".

== Track listing ==
No.	Title	Writer(s)	Length
1.	"Nasty Boyz"	Lee Aaron, John Albani	4:06
2.	"Yesterday"	Aaron, Albani, Phil Naro, Mladen Zarron	4:50
3.	"Gotta Thing for You"	Aaron, Albani, Naro, Zarron	4:06
4.	"Rock Candy" (Montrose cover)	Ronnie Montrose, Sammy Hagar, Bill Church, Denny Carmassi	4:11
5.	"Tough Girls Don't Cry"	Aaron, Albani	4:40
6.	"Sweet Talk"	Aaron, Albani	6:02
7.	"Rock the Hard Way"	Aaron, Albani, Stan Meissner	3:47
8.	"Shame"	Aaron, Albani	4:51
9.	"Whatcha Do to My Body"	Aaron, Albani	4:46
10.	"Hands On"	Aaron, Albani, Paul Sabu	4:15
11.	"Rebel Angel"	Aaron, Albani, Naro, Zarron	4:18
12.	"How Deep"	Aaron, Albani, Marvin Birt	5:11
Total length:			55:03

== Personnel ==
- Lee Aaron – lead vocals, backing vocals
- John Albani – guitar, backing vocals, producer
- Scott Humphrey – drum programming, bass (except track 12)
- Matthew Gerrard – bass (track 12)
- Phil Naro – backing vocals
- Chas Anthony – backing vocals
- Lenny DeRose – engineering, mixing
- Darren Millar – engineering
- Marty Ogden – mixing
- Brian Allen – producer

== Chart performance ==
=== Album ===
Year	Chart	Peak position
1989	Canadian albums chart	24
1989	German albums chart	36

=== Singles ===
Year	Title	Chart	Peak
1989	"Whatcha Do to My Body"	The Record	25
1989	"Whatcha Do to My Body"	RPM	25
1989	"Hands On"	The Record	35
1989	"Hands On"	The Record CHR	37
1989	"Hands On"	RPM	38

== Awards ==
Event	Title	Award	Result
1990 Junos	"Whatcha Do to My Body"	Video of the Year	Nominated
1991 Junos	Bodyrock	Album of the Year	Nominated
1991 Junos	Bodyrock	Rock Album of the Year	Nominated

== Certifications ==
Year	Certification	Region
1989	Platinum	Canada
