= Moxy (band) =

Canadian rock band

- Origin: Toronto, Ontario, Canada
- Genres: Hard rock; heavy metal
- Years active: 1973–1983; 1999–present
- Labels: Independent; Unidisc; Pacemaker Records; Mercury; Polydor Records
- Website: officialmoxy.com

Moxy is a Canadian rock band, formed in Toronto, Ontario in 1973. They toured Canada before having a hit in late 1975 with "Can't You See I'm A Star". Moxy then toured the United States on the strength of their radio airplay. Markets in which the band was very popular included Ontario, Chicago, St. Louis, Detroit, and San Antonio. Joe Anthony, "The Godfather of Rock" in San Antonio on KISS-FM was largely responsible for the popularity of the band in Texas and helped bring about their first headline appearance in the U.S. in 1977, appearing with AC/DC as their opening act.

Despite the death of Joe Anthony, the Moxy-Texas connection has continued into the present with Moxy's hits like "Can't You See I'm A Star", "Moon Rider", and "Sail On Sail Away". "Midnight Flight", "I'll Set You on Fire", and "Are You Ready" remain on the daily rotation at many Texas radio stations.

== History ==
=== 1973–1983 ===
Formed in Toronto, Ontario in 1973, from previous members of the rock group Leigh Ashford – which included singer Douglas "Buzz" Shearman (former teen singer of Sherman & Peabody), alongside Greg Godovitz of Fludd and Goddo, and Gil Moore (later of Triumph), Earl Johnson (former member of King Biscuit Boy), Bill Wade (former member of Outlaw Music and Brutus under the alias Hally Hunter that also included Gino Scarpelli of Goddo) and Terry Juric, as Leigh Ashford.

Moxy made their first appearance on the music scene in October 1974 at Scarborough's notorious rock club "The Knob Hill Hotel". Shortly thereafter, Fraser was replaced by Terry Juric on the recommendation of Earl Johnson and the group changed its name to MOXY. Their first single release was a trial run of "Can't You See I'm A Star", which was distributed by Yorkville Records. The promising sound of the single received heavy radio support from CHUM (AM) in Toronto and led to the band's signing of a contract with Polydor Records of Canada in December 1974. The Polydor Records contract was mainly due to the popularity and success of the former band, Leigh Ashford, and to Buzz Shearman's reputation.

==== Self-titled debut ====
The independently produced self-titled album, MOXY, also known as the Black Album,^{photo} was recorded over two weeks in early 1975. Mark Smith of Bachman–Turner Overdrive fame acted as co-producer for the album. While in Van Nuys, California at Sound City Studios recording this album, session guitarist Tommy Bolin was in the studio next door. Earl Johnson was actually supposed to have done all the guitar parts, but got into a disagreement with the engineer and was consequently tossed out of the studio. Roland Paquin knew Bolin from when he was a road manager for The James Gang, and enlisted Bolin to record solos on six tracks. After the Moxy sessions, Bolin continued to work on his first solo album Teaser, and later that year got the call from David Coverdale to join Deep Purple.

Having heard the impact of the twin guitars, Moxy then headed back to Toronto in search of a rhythm guitarist who would free up Earl Johnson to play the material on tour that had been added to the songs in the studio by Tommy Bolin. Buddy Caine, a friend of Earl Johnson's, became the needed second guitarist, allowing the group to then hit the road with a Canadian tour that included Ontario, Quebec and the Maritimes, where the group mostly played small venues.

Moon Rider (1975)
"Moon Rider", from 1975 album Moxy, by Earl Johnson, Buzz Shearman.

The first album found its way to hard rock stations in the southern US. In the winter of 1975, "Can't You See I'm A Star" and "Moon Rider" were receiving heavy radio support from KMAC/KISS in San Antonio, Texas. Tommy Bolin's contribution would get some much needed attention for the album in the U.S. media, even though Bolin always downplayed his involvement. Moxy renegotiated a new contract with Polydor of Canada for distribution in affiliation with Mercury Records. Both labels were owned by PolyGram Records at the time, who reissued the self-titled debut album in North America and worldwide in 1976. In the spring of 1976, "Fantasy" and "Sail On Sail Away" hit the top 20 charts on KISS-FM radio in San Antonio, Texas. KISS-FM disc jockey Joe Anthony had the freedom to play the album in its entirety on many occasions through the late 1970s.

We did an interview with a DJ in Texas, I asked him what songs of ours they were playing. He said, "First we play the first side, then we play the second side." I just about fell off my chair.

— Earl Johnson.

==== Moxy II ====
Cause There's Another (1976)
"Cause There's Another", from 1976 album Moxy I, by Buddy Caine, Buzz Shearman.

After a few years of touring Moxy went from a bar band to headline concert attraction in Canada. Moxy II was recorded in the band's hometown of Toronto at Sound Stage studio with famed Aerosmith producer Jack Douglas. This was a year after the first album for Canadian fans, but just three months after the reissued copy of Moxy I was released in the U.S. Moxy II received international press coverage for the band. Most reviews predicted success for the band and comparisons were made to Aerosmith, Rush and Deep Purple. Moxy II was also highly acclaimed on its release by Geoff Barton of the UK music publication Sounds, who made the album available to its readers for the special price of only £1.50. Geoff Barton would later refer to Moxy as the Canadian Zeppelin.

In the fall of 1976, Moxy was touring throughout Ontario, Quebec and the Maritimes. They then toured Texas as the opening act for Black Sabbath and Boston, except at the new Convention Center arena in San Antonio 24 October 1976, where Boston was the opening act. 17 November 1976, "Take it Or Leave It", reached No. 14 on the Top 30 CHUM AM in Toronto and in Texas "Midnight Flight", "Cause There's Another", and "Take it or Leave It" received heavy radio support. Moxy then toured California, Illinois and Missouri. "Cause There's Another" reached No. 16 on CHUM (AM) radio on 26 March 1977.

==== Ridin' High ====
Are You Ready (1977)
"Are You Ready", from 1977 album Ridin' High, by Buddy Caine, Buzz Shearman.

March 1977, after touring non-stop since the release of Moxy II, Moxy went back to the studio in Toronto to record another album with Jack Douglas producing again. The result was Ridin' High which once more contained all-original material written by the band members with a harder and heavy sound than the first two albums. The album received good reviews, with nomination of a Juno Award in 1977 for most promising group of the year. However airplay was limited as FM radio stations in Canada and northern U.S. shifted to softer rock. Nevertheless, in the southern U.S. and Europe, "Are You Ready", "Ridin' High", and "I'll Set You on Fire" received heavy radio support.

I remember going in doing radio interviews and "Ridin' High" was the single and they would put it on and all the needles would just go tilt over right into the red and the station engineer would be freaking out."

— Earl Johnson

On 27 July 1977, Joe Anthony brought Moxy to Texas for their first headline appearance in the U.S. in Austin at Armadillo World Headquarters. The next night in San Antonio at the Municipal Auditorium and on 29 July in Corpus Christi, Texas, at Ritz Music Hall, with AC/DC as the opening act for all three dates. Moxy went on to tour throughout California, Illinois, Missouri, Michigan with bands like Styx, The Ramones, Hall & Oates, Rainbow, The Runaways, and Trooper, ending the tour with a headline show at Massey Hall in Toronto.

The hard touring and rigorous schedule was beginning to take its toll on the band by late 1977. Most of the band members had been touring since the late 1960s in other bands before Moxy was formed. Living a life filled with sex, drugs and rock and roll, the band had been slowly self-destructing for years. Buzz Shearman had developed vocal cord problems and singer-soundman Brian Maxim (singer on Moxy V) had to be called in to hit the high notes off-stage. Shearman decided to leave in late 1977 after the Ridin' High tour, due to personality conflicts and to seek medical attention for his vocal cords and drinking problem.

==== Under the Lights ====
Under the Lights (1978)
"Under the Lights", from 1978 album Under the Lights, by Buddy Caine, Mike Reno.

Michael Rynoski, who later changed his name to Mike Reno and played with Loverboy, replaced Buzz Shearman and made his musical debut on Moxy's next album. Bill Wade had also left the band in early 1977 and had been replaced by Danny Bilan.

Danny Bilan would later join Wild T and the Spirit after turning up on Hanover Fist's album Hungry Eyes. Moxy's new album's title track Under the Lights and "High School Queen" made the charts in Canada, but the album lacked the punch of the band's earlier works instead opting for a laid-back sound. The album did not receive a strong response in terms of either record sales or audiences that it had with Shearman as the vocalist.

Earl Johnson had left Moxy in the summer of 1978 just after the album's release and was replaced by Woody West who was a former member of the big band version of The Stampeders and a former member of Brutus.

Under The Lights, wasn't even really a Moxy album. Mike Reno, great voice, but he just wasn't a hard-edged singer. I left the band a couple of months after it came out because I knew basically that Moxy wasn't what it started out to be.

— Earl Johnson

==== Buzz's return and death ====
In 1978 Shearman had formed his own band called Buzz Saw with ex-Christmas guitarist Bob Bulger and drummer Frank Russell.^{photo} However following Mike Reno's departure in 1979, Buzz reformed Moxy playing festivals such as the Canadian World Music Festival with Aerosmith, Johnny Winter, Ted Nugent and Goodo.

In March 1980, Buzz was a candidate to replace the deceased Bon Scott in AC/DC but because his recurring vocal cord problems would not allow him to tour extensively, AC/DC band members ultimately decided on ex-Geordie singer Brian Johnson.

In 1982, Buzz, Earl and Bill helped fellow Canadian singer-songwriter Lee Aaron on her debut album, The Lee Aaron Project. However due to his touring restraints caused by his vocal cords Buzz was worked a day job at Shaw Industries to support his young family while shopping for a new record deal when on 16 June 1983, at the age of 33, just north of Toronto, he was involved in a motorcycle accident that took his life.

Trouble (1984)
"Trouble " From 1984 Album A Tribute to Buzz Shearman, By Buzz Shearman

The original members reunited after Buzz's death to put on a benefit concert and release a retrospective package, with proceeds earmarked for Valerie (Buzz's widow) and Jesse Shearman (son). The retrospective package released by Ahed Records, called A Tribute to Buzz Shearman, features three previously unreleased Moxy songs with Buzz on vocals: "Highway", "Eyeballs", and "Trouble". The back cover of the album features a testimonial from San Antonio's disc jockey known as the godfather of rock, Joe Anthony, who wrote : "Buzz had that special quality in his voice that carried a smile and a lift. He penetrated himself into the listeners and was very forceful with them. He gave a definite impression to the music. His passing was untimely, but he gave us so much in such a short span. His music is his legacy".

An unreleased Moxy track with Buzz Sherman on vocals was unearthed in 2009. The song titled "You Can't Stop the Music in Me" was released to radio and online retailers on Buzz's birthday, 8 March 2009. The song was co-written with Billy Wade, and recorded in 1981 with his Moxy bandmates. A retrospective DVD with the same title was released in November 2009 covering the early years of Moxy.

==== Side projects ====
Terry Juric appeared on Thor's 1978 album Keep The Dogs Away during Moxy's down time and then appeared on pop-rocker Stanley Frank's 1980 album Play It Til It Hurts. Bill Wade would show up on Thor's 1997 album An-THOR-Logy, recorded in 1979, and performed on The Cry's 1980 album Wispear and then formed the band Bongo Furies with fellow Canadian rocker Gino Scarpelli and bassist Terry McKeowen.

Buddy Caine, Terry Juric, Danny Bilan and Brian Maxim (Moxy's 1970s backup singer) later formed the band Voodoo. The Buddy Caine Band would later be formed by Buddy, who wrote a song in honor of Buzz called "Feed The Fire" that was released on the 1994 album Best Of Moxy: Self-Destruction.

Although Johnson had re-join Buzz on a few occasions, he had decided to retire from being a fulltime musician after leaving Moxy and became the sales manager for Cerwin-Vega. During this time, Johnson did record some music like "Heaven On Heels", "Body Contact" and "Killer on the Loose" with Tom Griffin (co-writer of "Candy Delight" on Moxy V), Howie Warden, and Danny "Coke" Colonello playing local Toronto bars and night clubs like El Mocambo, Gasworks, and Larry's Hideaway as a fun pastime.

=== Reunion (1999 - 2008) ===
==== Moxy V ====
Working Man (2001)
"Working Man", from 2001 album Moxy V, by Bill Wade.

In 1999, Bill Wade gets Moxy back together into his home studio, with Earl Johnson and Buddy Caine after a 20-year recording gap, to produce Moxy's fifth studio album, Moxy V. The new album returned them to the hard rock sound of the first three albums. New vocalist Brian Maxim (former member of Stumbling Blind and The Passing Fancy), who was considered a true member of Moxy, as Brian sung back-ups for "Buzz" on tour back in 1977, worked with Buddy Caine and Terry Juric in the band Voodoo and worked with "Buzz" at Shaw Industries in the early 1980s.

The album includes "Working Man" (an early tune by Billy Wade), "Yuccatan Man" (unreleased Buddy Caine composition from the early Moxy days), and "Walking on the Wild Side" (unreleased Earl Johnson composition from the early Moxy days). Bill Wade grew very ill shortly after Moxy V was released. Unable to continue, a replacement for Bill became necessary and a bass player was also needed. Bill's replacement was Kim Hunt who was known in the Toronto area as a former member of Zon. Bill would succumb to cancer on 27 July 2001, at the age of 53.

==== Raw ====
For their 25 anniversary Moxy played in San Antonio alongside fellow special guests Saxon in 2000 again in 2004 with Budgie and Michael Schenker (Scorpions and UFO) at the annual Legs Diamond bash in the Sunken Garden Theater to the delight of 6,000 fans. The popularity that Moxy held in Europe prompted the band's first tour outside North America in 2001, accompanied by a new CD cover of Moxy V unique for the European fans.

On 12 January 2001, Moxy appeared at the legendary El Mocambo club in Toronto. This appearance was video recorded but has still not been officially released as a DVD. World Studios however has released one song from the performance for public viewing – World Studios – "Time To Move On".

Late 2001 saw Moxy move to a new label Bullseye Records of Canada and release the greatest hits live album Raw, which was recorded in Pickering, Ontario at a secret warehouse performance to an invitation-only audience. Bullseye also re-released Moxy V in North America with remastered and re-edited songs and a new track sequence supervised by Earl Johnson at Soho Studios in Toronto by engineer Glenn Belcher.

Brian Maxim left the band in 2003 and his replacement was Alex Machin who fronted A Foot in Coldwater, a successful 1970s band from the Toronto area. Alex had also fronted Champion on one album released in 1984. For the 30th anniversary of Moxy's classic debut album in 2005, Moxy played the Voyageur Days Festival in Mattawa, Ontario, with Canadian classic rockers Chilliwack, Toronto, Trooper, Goddo, Killer Dwarfs, and Ray Lyell. On 26 August 2005, Moxy performed "Can't You See I'm A Star" and "Cause There's Another", the band's two biggest Canadian hits, live on Citytv in Toronto. In December 2008, guitarist Buddy Caine retired to spend more time at home with his family. Alex also left Moxy in 2008.

=== Earl Johnson era (2009 - present) ===
Johnson, now the lone original member and director of the Ajax Guitar Academy, recruited Russell Graham of the Killer Dwarfs as Moxy's new vocalist. With Graham as Moxy's vocalist a live album recorded on September 7th 2013 at the Sound Academy in Toronto was released in 2014. Johnson and Graham also formed the supergroup called "Hard Road" that included bassist Rick Lazaroff (from Santers) and drummer Morgan Evans (from the Lee Aaron band).

Graham's departure in 2013 saw Nick Walsh of Slik Toxik take over as lead vocalist for the DVD titled 40 Years And Still Riding High released in 2015, that featured a limited edition DVD in a triple CD boxset.

Throughout 2020s Johnson has continue to assemble a variety of veteran musicians to appear with him as Moxy in small venues and festivals in North America and Europe.

== Legacy ==
Moxy... was one of the best heavy metal acts to develop in Canada. Their debut album MOXY was as good or better than material from most of the heavy metal acts in North America or England. -— Martin Melhuish, Heart of Gold: 30 Years of Canadian Pop Music.

Moxy's first three albums with Buzz Shearman remain commercially successful, with Moxy I on vinyl being most popular with die-hard Bolin fans.

The songs "Train" and "Time to Move On" appear on The Ultimate: The Best of Tommy Bolin box set in 1989. In 2004, the song "Cause There's Another" appear on a compilation album of Canada's most popular rock and roll acts called When Cancon Rocked!.

Also in 2004, Moxy made the KZEP FM (San Antonio, Texas) "Top 104 Best Groups of All Time" at number 87, ahead of Quiet Riot, Mötley Crüe, Whitesnake, Queensrÿche, and Iron Maiden. "Can't You See I'm A Star" appeared in the Pierre Trudeau mini-movie (approximately 40 minutes into part two) that was released in 2005. In 2006, Moxy was featured in an article that included band's like Ram Jam and Tucky Buzzard called Top 6 Classic Rock Bands You Never Knew You Didn't Know written by Dave White.

== Band members ==
=== Original members ===
- Douglas "Buzz" Shearman – vocals (1973–1977, 1979–1983)
- Earl Johnson – guitar (1973–1978, 1999–present)
- Bill Wade – drums (1974–1978, 1999–2000)
- Terry Juric – bass (1974–1983)
- Buddy Caine – guitar (1975–1983, 1999–2008)

Note: Buddy Caine is listed on the album Moxy, but did not join the band until after the album was finished.

=== Other members ===
- Tommy Bolin: (1975) guitar solos: studio Moxy I
- Tom Stephenson: keyboards: studio Moxy I (Bolin's keyboardist) (1975)
- Mike Reno: vocals (1978) – then Loverboy
- Danny Bilan: drums (1977–1983) – then Wild T and the Spirit
- Scott "Professor Piano" Cushnie: keyboards (1978)
- Woody West: guitar (1978–1979) – from The Stampeders and "Brutus"
- Doug MacAskill: guitar (1979–1983) – from The Stampeders then The Arrows
- Brian Maxim: vocals (1999–2003) – from "Stumbling Blind" and "A Passing Fancy"
- Alex Machin: vocals (2003–2008) – from "Island" then A Foot in Coldwater then "Champion"
- Jim Samson: bass (1999–2013) – from Zon
- Kim Hunt: drums (2000–2013) – from Island Zon then "Urgent"
- Russell Graham: vocals (2008–2013) – from Killer Dwarfs then "Penny Black" then "Hard Road"
- Andy Narsingh: bass, backing vocals (2013) – From Dave Barrett Trio, Arsin, Juggernaut Jam Band, Permanent Waves - (A RUSH Tribute)
- Rob Robbins: guitar, backing vocals (2013–2023) – from Steel Lily, Dr. Dirty with Rhett Forrester (Riot)
- Nicholas Walsh: vocals (2013–2023) – from Slik Toxik, Famous Underground
- Mike Cotton: drums (2014–2015)
- Rod Albon: bass, backing vocals (2015–2018) Performed all Bass tracks on "40 Years and Still Riding High" -from Steel Lily, Tracenine
- Desche Sparboom: drums (2015–2024) Fear Disorder, Famous Underground
- Chaz Coats-Butcher: bass (2018–2024) Lee Aaron, Forgotten Rebels, Broken Silence, Invisible Man, Second Hand Stereo, Eric Martin and the Independents
- Gus Indovina: bass, backing vocals (2024-present)
- Ron Mcleod: drums (2024–present) Blackwell, Sanctuary, Canada Roxx, Bon Jovi Forever, Floyd Factor
- Baz Littlerock: vocals (2024–present) The Baz Littlerock Band, Bon Jovi Forever, BANG, Voorhees

== Discography ==
=== Albums ===
Buzz Sherman era (1974 - 1977, 1979 - 1983)

- Moxy (1975)
- Moxy II (1976)
- Ridin' High (1977)
- A Tribute to Buzz Shearman (1984) (compilation)
- Best Of: Self-Destruction (1994) (compilation)
- "You Can't Stop the Music in Me" (2009) (single record in 1981)

Mike Reno era (1978)

- Under the Lights (1978)
  - Thinking About You (1980) (repackaging of Under the Lights)

Reunion era (1999 - 2008)

- Moxy V (2000)
- Raw (2002) (live)

Earl Johnson era (2009 to present)

- "Moxy - Live in Toronto" (2014)
- 40 Years And Still Riding High (2015)

=== DVD ===
- Live In Toronto (2015) Escape Records- 3 disc release of "40 Years and Still Riding High"

=== Singles ===
- 1974 Can’t You See I’m A Star/Out of the Darkness Into The Fire (Yorkville) YVM-45105
- 1975 Sail On, Sail Away (Edit)/Time To Move On (Polydor) 2065-291
- 1976 Take It Or Leave It/Wet Suit (Polydor) 2065-318
- 1977 Cause There’s Another (Edit)/Slippin’ Out (Polydor) 2065-340
- 1977 Ridin’ High/I’ll Set You On Fire (Polydor) 2065-353
- 1977 Rock ‘N’ Roll Volume 1 [4-song 7″ EP] (Polydor – BRAZIL) 2229-203
- 1978 Sing To Me/Livin’ And Learnin’ (Polydor) 2065-387
- 1978 Sailor’s Delight (Edited)/Maybe I Can See You (Polydor) 2065-394
- 1983 Trouble/Take It Or Leave It (Ahed) AH-1009
- 2009 You Can’t Stop the Music In Me [Digi-File]

=== Albums release history ===
- 1975 Moxy (Polydor) 2480-132
- 1976 Moxy II (Polydor) 2480-372
- 1977 Ridin’ High (Polydor) 2480-402
- 1978 Under The Lights (Polydor) 2480-460
- 1980 Thinking About You [re-issue of ‘Under The Lights’] (Ahed) AS-8228
- 1984 Moxy: A Tribute To Buzz Shearman (Ahed) AS-8227
- 1984 Ridin’ High/Change In My Life [7″] (Ahed) AH-1010
- 1984 Ridin’ High/Change In My Life [12”] (Ahed) A12-1
- 1994 Self-Destruction: The Best of Moxy (Pacemaker) PACE-001
- 1995 Moxy [reissue] (Pacemaker) PACE-016
- 1995 Moxy II [reissue] (Pacemaker) PACE-017
- 1995 Ridin’ High [reissue] (Pacemaker) PACE-018
- 2000 Moxy V (Pacemaker) MAKE-1
- 2001 Moxy V [reissue] (Bullseye) BLR-CD-4057
- 2002 Raw (Bullseye) BLR-CD-4059
- 2014 Live In Toronto (Perris – US) PER-5092
- 2015 40 Years And Still Riding High [2CD + DVD] (Perris – US) PER-5082
- 2022 Moxy [LP reissue] (Unidisc) AGEK-2241LP
- 2022 Moxy II [LP reissue] (Unidisc) AGEK-2242LP
- 2022 Ridin’ High [LP reissue] (Unidisc) AGEK-2243LP
- 2022 Under The Lights [LP reissue] AGEK-2244LP
- 2022 Moxy: A Tribute To Buzz Shearman (Unidisc) AGEK-2245LP
- 2022 Self-Destruction [LP reissue] (Unidisc) SPLP-7326

=== Compilations ===
- 1977 “Take It Or Leave It” on ‘Right On’ (K-Tel) TC-236
- 1977 “Cause There’s Another” on ‘Stars’ (K-Tel) TC-248
- 1977 “Nothin’ Comes Easy” on ‘Mercury Sampler’ (Phonogram) MK-35
- 1984 “Another Time, Another Place” on ‘Striktly for Konnoisseurs’ (Music for Nations – US) MFN-32
- 1989 “Train” and “Time To Move On” on ‘Tommy Bolin: The Ultimate…’ [3LP] (Geffen) GHS-24248
- 1999 “Wet Suit” on ‘The Ultimate DEEP PURPLE – Fire, Ice & Dynamite Vol.1’ (Teichitsu Entertainment – SOUTH KOREA) TEP-02112MP
- 2001 “Nitro Love” on ‘Compilation Sampler #1’ (Record Heaven – SWEDEN) RHCCD-1
- 2004 “Cause There’s Another” on ‘When CanCon Rocked – Volume 1’ (Bullseye) BLR-CD-4015

== See also ==
- Canadian rock
- Music of Canada
