= Jim Gelcer =

Canadian drummer and musician (born 1961)

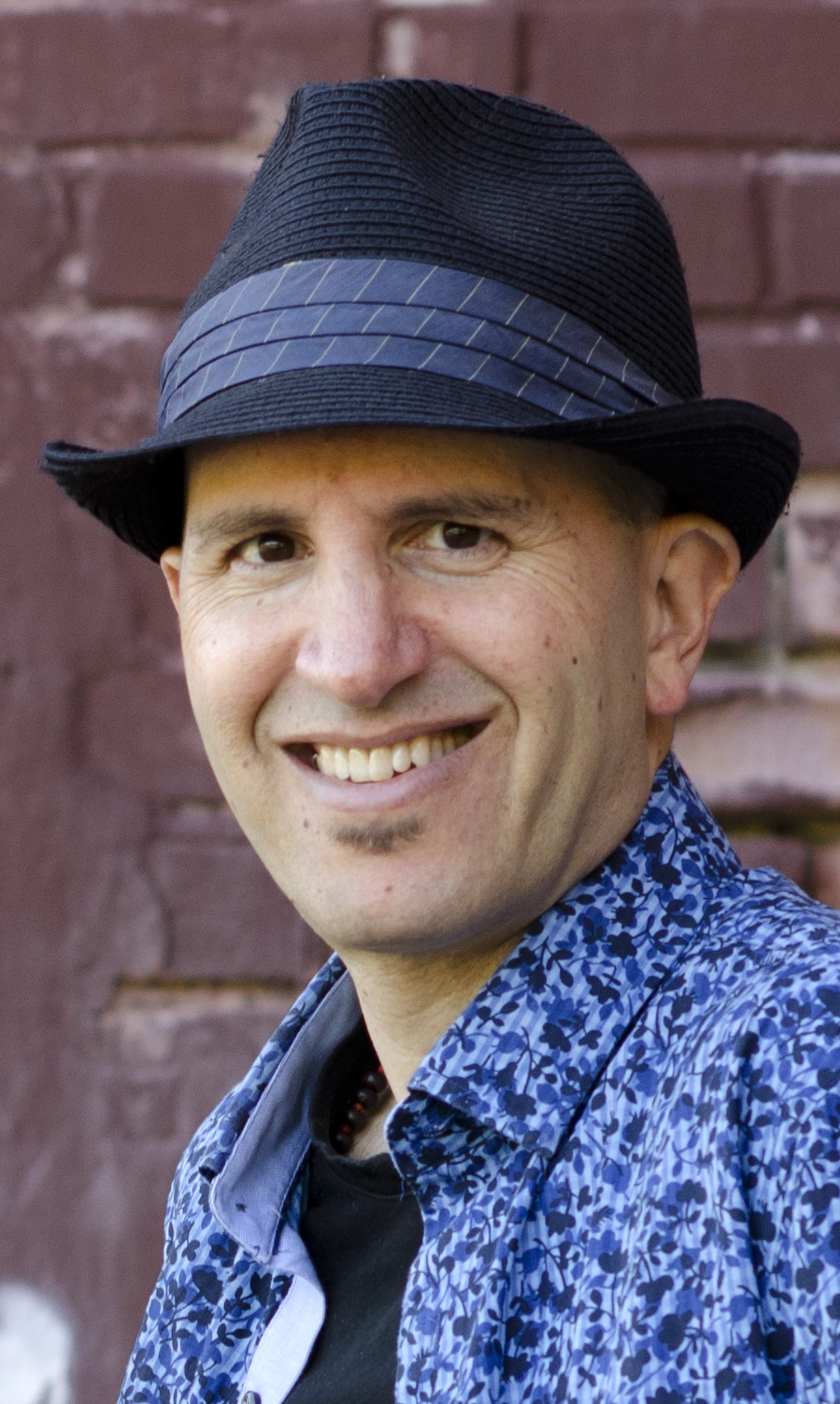
- Jim Gelcer in 2014

Background information
- Born: December 16, 1961 (age 64); Cape Town, South Africa
- Origin: Toronto, Ontario, Canada
- Genres: Kirtan, jazz, world,
- Instruments: Vocals, guitar
- Years active: 1985–present
- Website: gelcer.com

Jim Gelcer (born December 16, 1961) is a Canadian jazz drummer, singer, musician, composer, and producer, also known for blending traditional kirtan, a genre of spiritual music from India, with modern influences like R&B, jazz, and rock.

== History ==
Jim Gelcer was born in Cape Town, South Africa and moved to Toronto, Ontario, Canada in 1968. He attended Eastman School of Music in 1980, studying drums, vibraphone, arranging and improvisation with Ray Ricker, Bill Dobbins, Dave Ratajczak, and Lee Musiker. In 1984, Gelcer studied jazz with David Mott at York University. Soon afterwards he established himself as a professional musician.

Gelcer has performed, recorded, and toured with acts as diverse as Lee Aaron, and the Flying Bulgar Klezmer Band. He has also worked with Lorne Lofsky, Paul Hoffert, Don Thompson, Russ Little, Terry Clarke, Pat LaBarbera, Guido Basso, Steve Wallace, John Sherwood, Nancy Walker, Richard Underhill, George Koller, Reg Schwager, Dave Young and Bratty and the Babysitters.

Early in his career, Gelcer composed music for film and television, including Price of Vengeance (1985), The Journal on CBC (1985–89), and My Happy Days in Hell (1994). More recently, Jim teamed with Donald Quan to form Gopher Lunch, a film music recording house and music library.

== Kirtan Music ==
He studied Sivananda Yoga and became serious about Kirtan after a visit to Sivananda Ashram in the Laurentian Mountains where he was invited to chant in the temple. He completed yoga teacher training at the Sivananda Ashram Yoga Retreat in Paradise Island, Bahamas in March 2006, and shortly after that began leading Kirtan. His debut Kirtan recording "Bhagavan" was released in 2010 and hailed as one of the year's best by American radio shows in the Spirit – WRPI FM and Full Lotus Kirtan Show – WCOM FM. Yoga Chicago magazine called him "the perfect bhakti singer".

In 2013, Gelcer released his second album, Bhakti Groove Machine, which was recorded with Grammy-nominated producer Ben Leinbach (Jai Uttal, Deva Premal, Snatam Kaur).

He performs regularly at yoga studios and temples, along with festivals such as Bhaktifest. He also teaches a daily yoga class on the meditation app Insight Timer. From 2012 to 2017, he was musical director for Shri Fest, a yoga, music and art festival held at Blue Mountain, Ontario.

== Discography ==
- Forgiveness (2024) with David Vito Gregoli
- As Things Unfold (2023) with Hans Christian (musician)
- Warrior Spirit (2022) with Hans Christian (musician)
- Resistance (2022) with Hans Christian (musician)
- Mariupol (2022) with Hans Christian (musician)
- Reconcile (Entheo Remix Ambient Version) (2022) with DTO, Brenda McMorrow, Entheo
- Do Androids Dream of Savasana (2021)
- Reconcile (2020) with DTO, Brenda McMorrow
- I Got Your Back (2020) with Don Breithaupt
- Cape Town to Kolkata (2019)
- Jim and Paul play Glenn and Ludwig (2018) with Paul Hoffert, George Koller
- Awakening (I Am Not This Body) (2017)
- Melodies Pure and True (2016)
- Going Om (2014) with Donald Quan
- Bhakti Groove Machine (2013)
- How High The Bird (2011) with Paul Hoffert
- Bhagavan (2010)

As side musician:

- Jon Mullane, The Sun in the Summertime (2023) songwriter
- Jon Mullane, Feels Like Christmas (2021) drums, songwriter
- Michael Moon, Earth Song (2016) drums
- Fraz, Hear (2001) drums
- Lee Aaron, Lee Aaron (1987) keyboards, vocals
- Bratty and the Babysitters, In A State (1987) keyboards, percussion
- Johnny Lovesin, Tough Breaks (1986) keyboards

As producer:

- Jim Gelcer / Paul Hoffert Trio featuring George Koller, Jim and Paul play Glenn and Ludwig (2018) Co-produced with Paul Hoffert
- Jim Gelcer, Awakening (I Am Not This Body) (2017) Co-produced with Anjelica
- Jim Gelcer, Melodies Pure and True (2016)
- Shantdeep, Om The Water (2016)
- Jim Gelcer & Donald Quan, Going OM (2014) Co-produced with Donald Quan
- Devorah / Love Child, Love is All (2013) Co-produced with Chris Gartner
- Jim Gelcer, Bhakti Groove Machine (2013) Co-produced with Ben Leinbach
- Jim Gelcer / Paul Hoffert Trio, How High The Bird (2011) Co-produced with Paul Hoffert
- Charlie Ringas / Don Valley Parkway, News Wave (1990) Co-produced with Charlie Ringas

== Digital media ==
Gelcer worked with the Harvard University digital media start up, Noank Media Inc., as the Vice President of Content Acquisition and Business Development and later Chief Operating Officer. Noank Media Inc. aimed to license and distribute digital content globally while fairly compensating content owners, using the most efficient, sustainable, and effective business and technology systems. They successfully demonstrated their proprietary digital media exchange platform and reached a partnership with CERNET (China Education and Research Network).

== Board positions ==
He has served on the boards of several arts organizations including the Glenn Gould Foundation from 2010 to 2013 as Fundraising Chair, Toronto Summer Music Festival, Via Salzburg Chamber Orchestra, and Mariposa in the Schools.
