= 2preciious =

Canadian alternative rock band

Background information
- Genres: Alternative rock
- Years active: 1994-1996
- Labels: Spastic Plastic
- Members: Lee Aaron; Don Short; Don Binns; Don Harrison

2preciious was a Canadian alternative rock band featuring Lee Aaron.

== Biography ==
In 1994, Aaron was attempting to move on from her "Metal Queen" image and met with Don Short and Don Binns of the band Sons of Freedom, who participated in the recording of Aaron's 1994 album Emotional Rain. They were then joined by Sons of Freedom guitarist Don Harrison in recording the new songs "Strange Alice" and "Concrete & Ice", which were added as bonus tracks to the European edition of Emotional Rain.

In November 1995, the four musicians began recording a new album under the band name 2preciious. Aaron's contributions were under her real name, Karen Greening.

The self-titled album was released in 1996, and the band toured to support it. Critical response to the album was mixed: Tom Harrison of The Province called it "a true collaboration ... that brings out untapped qualities in both parties". The Globe and Mail's Chris Dafoe dismissed it as crass and calculated, and labelled the single "Crawl" as a blatant copy of Alanis Morissette's "You Oughta Know", while Peter Howell of the Toronto Star said that the album was uneven but showed potential, comparing it more to Garbage. The single "Superbitch" received moderate radio airplay.

The band did not record another album. Aaron moved from rock to jazz singing, while The Three Dons moved into production and, in 2004, joined the band Jakalope.

== Track listings ==
- CD: No Bull Records / 335 15-2 Austria

Music By, Lyrics By – Don Binns, Don Harrison, Don Short, Karen Lynn Greening

1. "Crawl" – 4:58
2. "Superbitch" – 3:53
3. "Come On Song" – 4:37
4. "My Machine" – 4:12
5. "Mascara" – 4:14
6. "Misenchanted" – 4:35
7. "Black Metal Jesus" – 3:01
8. "Here" – 3:49
9. "Obsolete" – 4:00
10. "Shed" – 4:23
11. "Strange Alice" – 4:48
12. “Dying Star" – 4:50 1
