= The Lee Aaron Project =

Studio album by Lee Aaron
- Released: 1982
- Studio: Masters Workshop, Phase One Studios and Metalworks Studios in Toronto
- Genre: Hard rock
- Length: 31:48
- Label: Freedom
- Producer: Robert Connolly, Rik Emmett

Lee Aaron chronology
The Lee Aaron Project (1982)	Metal Queen (1984)

Alternative cover
- 1984 reissue

The Lee Aaron Project is the first studio album by singer Lee Aaron, released in 1982 through Freedom Records. It was reissued on 18 May 1984 through Attic Records as Lee Aaron (not to be confused with her 1987 self-titled album).

== Track listing ==
No.	Title	Writer(s)	Length
1.	"Under Your Spell"	Lee Aaron, Dave Aplin, Gene Stout	3:30
2.	"Lonely for Your Love"	Rick Santers	3:39
3.	"Night Riders"	Aaron, Santers, Earl Johnson, Matt McGarry	2:51
4.	"Texas Outlaw"	Buzz Shearman, Bob Bulger	3:47
5.	"I Like My Rock Hard"	Frank Soda	3:47
6.	"I Just Wanna Make Love to You"	Willie Dixon	3:03
7.	"Runnin' from His Love"	Bill Wade	4:00
8.	"Should Have Known"	Shearman, Bulger	3:54
9.	"Took Your Heart Away"	Aaron, Santers	3:17
Total length:			31:48

1984 reissue bonus track
No.	Title	Writer(s)	Length
10.	"Under the Stars" (live at El Mocambo, Toronto)	Aaron, George Bernhardt	3:22

== Personnel ==
- Lee Aaron – lead vocals
- Buzz Shearman – lead vocals (tracks 4, 8), background vocals (track 8)
- Dave Aplin – guitar (tracks 1, 7)
- Rik Emmett – guitar (track 1), production
- Rick Santers – guitar (tracks 2–4, 6, 8, 9)
- Earl Johnson – guitar (tracks 4, 6, 8)
- Frank Soda – guitar (track 5)
- John Albani – guitar (track 10)
- George Bernhardt – guitar (track 10)
- Bill Wade – drums (tracks 1, 7)
- Mark Santers – drums (tracks 2–4, 6, 8, 9)
- Glen Gratto – drums (track 5)
- Randy Infuso – drums (track 10)
- Gene Stout – bass (tracks 1, 7)
- Rick Lazaroff – bass (tracks 2–4, 6, 8, 9)
- Peter Crolly – bass (track 5)
- Jack Meli – bass (track 10)
- Mavis Kirteme – background vocals (track 1)
- Paul Massey – engineering
- Robin Brouwers – engineering
- Ed Stone – engineering
- Robert Connolly – production
