= Metal Queen =

Studio album by Lee Aaron
- Released: February 24, 1984
- Studio: Phase One, Toronto
- Genre: Hard rock, heavy metal
- Length: 40:33
- Label: Attic
- Producer: Paul Gross

Lee Aaron chronology
The Lee Aaron Project (1982)	Metal Queen (1984)	Call of the Wild (1985)

Singles from Metal Queen
- 1. "Metal Queen" Released: 1984; 2. "Shake It Up" Released: 1984; 3. "We Will Be Rockin'" Released: 1984

Professional ratings
Review scores
Source	Rating
AllMusic	2/5 stars

Metal Queen is the second studio album by the Canadian rock singer Lee Aaron, released on February 24, 1984, through Attic Records. It reached No. 69 on the RPM Canadian Albums Chart and held that position for two weeks.

== Track listing ==
No.	Title	Writer(s)	Length
1.	"Metal Queen"	Lee Aaron, George Bernhardt	5:00
2.	"Lady of the Darkest Night"	Aaron, Bernhardt, Jack Meli	4:53
3.	"Head Above Water"	Aaron, John Albani	3:43
4.	"Got to Be the One"	Aaron, Bernhardt, Albani	5:15
5.	"Shake It Up"	Aaron, Bernhardt	3:09
6.	"Deceiver"	Aaron, Bernhardt	3:26
7.	"Steal Away Your Love"	Aaron, Bernhardt	4:21
8.	"Hold Out"	Aaron, Bernhardt, Doug Raymond	3:41
9.	"Breakdown"	Aaron, Bernhardt, Albani	3:37
10.	"We Will Be Rockin'"	Aaron, Bernhardt, Meli	3:28
Total length:			40:33

== Personnel ==
- Lee Aaron – lead vocals
- John Albani – guitar, backing vocals
- George Bernhardt – guitar, backing vocals
- Attila Demjen – drums
- Frank Russell – drums
- Jack Meli – bass, backing vocals
- Mick Walsh – engineering
- Paul Gross – producer

== Chart performance ==
Year	Chart	Position
1984	RPM Top 100 Albums	69
