= Raw (Moxy album) =

Live album by Moxy
- Released: 2002
- Recorded: 2000–2001 Texas Tour
- Genres: Hard rock; heavy metal
- Label: Bullseye Records
- Producers: Earl Johnson; Glenn Belcher

Moxy chronology
Moxy V (2000)	Raw (2002)	You Can't Stop The Music (2009)

Raw is a live album by the Canadian hard rock band Moxy, in its third incarnation with singer Brian Maxim. Brian had sung back-ups for Douglas "Buzz" Shearman (Original singer who had on/off again vocal cord problems) on tour back in 1977, worked with Buddy Caine and Terry Juric in the band Voodoo, and worked with "Buzz" in a building materials store in the early 1980s.

The album was released in 2002 accompanied by the remastered/re-edited/re-sequenced version of Moxy V. The album contains live-off-the-floor new recordings of songs from the band's first three albums from the 1970s. Brian would leave the band after touring Europe for the second time at the Sweden Rock Festival in 2003.

== Credits ==
- Earl Johnson - Guitar, Producer (Original Member)
- Buddy Caine - Guitar (Original Member)
- Jim Samson - Bass
- Kim Hunt - drums
- Brian Maxim - vocals
- Glenn Belcher - Producer, Engineer, Mastering
- Kim Hunt - Graphic Design
- Jaimie Vernon - Executive Producer
- Jim Hoeck - Executive Producer

== Track listing ==
1. "Midnight Flight" (4:34)
2. "Cant You See I'm a Star" (3:35)
3. "Time to Move On" (4:01)
4. "Cause There's Another" (4:05)
5. "Through the Storm" (4:04)
6. "Ill Set You on Fire" (3:30)
7. "Another Time Another Place" (4:02)
8. "Sweet Reputation" (4:13)
9. "Rock Baby" (4:18)
10. "Out of the Darkness" (5:12)
11. "Moon Rider" (4:13)
12. "Fantasy" (5:55)
13. "Sail on Sail Away" (5:27)
14. "Nothing Comes Easy" (6:22)
15. "Ridin High" (4:34)
