= Under the Lights =

Studio album by Moxy
- Released: 1978
- Recorded: Feb 1978 Toronto
- Genres: Hard rock; soft rock
- Length: 33:21
- Label: Polydor
- Producer: Jack Richardson

Moxy chronology
Ridin' High (1977)	Under the Lights (1978)	A Tribute to Buzz Shearman (1984)

Alternative cover
- Re-released in 1980 under the title "Thinking About You (As Mike Reno and Moxy)"

Under the Lights is the fourth album by the rock band Moxy in its second incarnation, released in 1978. With the departure of Buzz Shearman as lead vocalist in 1977 for medical reasons, Mike Reno (then known as Michael Rynoski) was brought for his debut in music. The album produced two minor Canadian hits with the title track "Under the Lights" plus "High School Queen", that gives a preview of the sound that Reno would take with him to his next band Loverboy that saw great success in the 1980s. Album sales were poor for Under the Lights as fans did not take to the new softer sound on the album.

In regards to the album itself and the singing of Mike Reno, Earl Johnson stated: "Under The Lights", wasn't even really a Moxy album. Mike Reno has a great voice, but he just wasn't a hard-edged singer". The album was re-released as Thinking About You (As Mike Reno and Moxy) in 1980 with different track running order.

== Personnel ==
- Michael Rynoski: vocals
- Earl Johnson: Guitar
- Buddy Caine: Guitar
- Terry Juric: Bass
- Danny Bilan: drums
- Jack Richardson - percussion
- Scott Cushnie - Piano
- Colina Phillips - Background Vocals
- Tracy Richardson - Background Vocals
- Sharon Williams - Background Vocals
- Brian Christian - Engineer
- Paul Hoffert -Vocal Arrangements
- Jack Richardson - Producer

== Track listing ==
Under the Lights (1978)
"Under the Lights " From 1978 Album Under the Lights, By Buddy Caine, Mike Reno

Mike Reno is credited under his birth name, Joseph Michael Rynoski

1. "High School Queen" - 4:53 - (Buddy Caine, Mike Reno)
2. "Under the Lights" - 4:09 - (Buddy Caine, Mike Reno)
3. "Maybe I'm a Dreamer" - 4:48 - (Earl Johnson, Mike Reno)
4. "Sing to Me" - 4:11 - (Earl Johnson, Mike Reno)
5. "Sailor's Delight" - 4:57 - (Buddy Caine, Mike Reno)
6. "Thinking About You" - 3:43 - (Buddy Caine, Mike Reno)
7. "Easy Come, Easy Go" - 4:49 - (Mike Reno)
8. "Living and Learning" - 3:59 - (Earl Johnson, Mike Reno)

Following Mike Reno's massive breakout success with Loverboy, the album was re-released in 1980 under the title "Thinking About You (As Mike Reno and Moxy)" with a new tracking order.

1. "Thinking About You" - 3:41
2. "Easy Come Easy Go" -4:48
3. "Livin' & Learnin'" - 3:57
4. "Sailor's Delight" - 5:01
5. "High School Queen" - 4:50
6. "Under The Lights" - 4:03
7. "Maybe I'm A Dreamer"- 4:43
8. "Sing To Me" - 4:05

== Release history ==
- 1978 Under The Lights (Polydor) 2480-460
- 1980 Thinking About You [re-issue of ‘Under The Lights’] (Ahed) AS-8228
- 2022 Under The Lights [LP reissue] AGEK-2244LP
