= Dirty Weapons =

Studio album by Killer Dwarfs
- Released: 1990
- Genre: Pop metal
- Label: Epic
- Producer: Andy Johns

Killer Dwarfs chronology
Big Deal (1988)	Dirty Weapons (1990)	Method to the Madness (1992)

Singles from Dirty Weapons
- 1. "Dirty Weapons" Released: 1990

Dirty Weapons is the fourth album by the Canadian band Killer Dwarfs, released in 1990. They supported it with a North American tour. The first single was the title track. Dirty Weapons peaked at No. 151 on the Billboard 200. It was nominated for a Juno Award for "Best Hard Rock or Metal Album".

== Production ==
Recorded over four months in Los Angeles, the album was produced by Andy Johns; frontman Russ Graham claimed that Bob Hope, who was a neighbor, alerted security a few times while they were recording. The band appreciated Johns's ability to work fast and to better capture their live sound. Nicky Hopkins contributed on piano. Killer Dwarfs started writing new material right after the release of their previous album, Big Deal. "Not Foolin'" is about a music industry figure who allegedly cheated the band out royalties. The title track was inspired by the 1989 air battle near Tobruk, wherein Libyan aircraft were shot down by American aircraft. "Want It Bad" is a power ballad.

== Critical reception ==
Professional ratings
Review scores
Source	Rating
AllMusic	3.5/5 stars
Calgary Herald	B
The Winnipeg Sun	3.5/5 stars

The Toronto Star said that "Dirty Weapons is a cleaner, crunchier showcase for the improved songwriting chops of Berklee-trained guitarist Mike Dwarf." The Calgary Herald called most of the album "weak-to-above average material" and noted that "the songwriting continues to lag." The Winnipeg Sun stated that the band, in Andy Johns, "has finally found the master mixer they've been looking for." AllMusic opined that Killer Dwarfs' "pop-metal style was sort of Mötley Crüe meets Ratt meets Poison."

== Track listing ==
No.	Title	Length
1.	"Dirty Weapons"
2.	"Nothin' Gets Nothin'"
3.	"All That We Dream"
4.	"Doesn't Matter"
5.	"Last Laugh"
6.	"Comin' Through"
7.	"One Way Out"
8.	"Appeal"
9.	"Not Foolin'"
10.	"Want It Bad"
