= Wild T and the Spirit =

Wild T & the Spirit
- Origin: Canada
- Genres: Blues rock
- Years active: 1990–present
- Members: Toney Springer; Trevor Bigam, Ryan Ast
- Past members: Guenther Kapelle RIP 2000-2020
- Website: www.wildtandthespirit.com

Wild T & the Spirit is a Canadian blues rock band, fronted by guitarist Tony Springer.

== History ==
Wild T & the Spirit was formed in 1990 by Springer with bassist Brian Dickie and drummer Danny Bilan (formerly of Moxy). The band released its Warner Bros. debut album, Love Crazy, in 1991. The album featured a single of the same name, which reached #1 on the RPM Cancon chart. Bassist Kojo Ferguson toured with the band in support of Love Crazy, appearing in the video for "Midnight Blues". Nazeem Lakay soon replaced Dickie on bass.

The following year, Springer was invited to play guitar on David Bowie's album Black Tie White Noise. Following that album and tour, Wild T & the Spirit released their second Warner Bros. album, Givin' Blood; in 1993, which featured the single "Freedom Train". The band toured Canada as a supporting act for Bon Jovi to promote the album. Givin' Blood earned a nomination for Best Hard Rock Album at the 1994 Juno Awards, and gave the band a Canadian chart hit with "Loveland".

In the latter half of the 1990s, Springer spent time in Chicago, Ill. performing as a sideman with various blues artists; he returned to Toronto and the band continued to play concert venues throughout Eastern Canada with new members, bassist Chas Laurie and former Frozen Ghost drummer John Bouvette. In 2000, the band released the album Strange Modern. Laurie left the band and was replaced by bassist Guenther Kapelle.

The band followed up with True Bliss on Bullseye/Taxim Records in 2004, with Kapelle. Jeff Healey, Carole Pope, and keyboardist Peter Nunn also appeared on True Bliss as guest musicians. The band toured throughout Canada, the US, the UK, and Europe. In 2008, the band released the album Fender Bender on Jazzhaus Records and continued on with their tour schedule. The new album was received well by fans and critic.

The band released an album in 2015 called Live, which was recorded live in Toronto. The lineup at that time was Springer, Kapelle, and drummer Dave Langguth. That year they performed at the East Coast Guitar Fest.

== Members ==
=== Current ===
- Wild T (Toney Springer) - guitar/lead vocals (1990–present)
- Ray Ray Trease - bass/vocals (2021–present)
- Trevor Bigam - drums/vocals (2012–present)

=== Touring ===
- Gary "Whip" Berndt - drums/vocals (1996–1997)
- Danny Buss - bass/Vocals (1996–1997)
- Trevor Bigam - drums/vocals (2012–present)
- Murad Gunduz - drums (2015–2016)
- Tim Gittens - drums (2019–present)
- Guenther Kapelle - bass/vocals (2000–2020)
- Dave Langguth - drums (2012–2018)
- Ray Ray Trease - Bass/vocals (2021-present)
