= Fludd (band) =

Canadian rock band

- Origin: Toronto, Ontario, Canada
- Genre: Rock
- Years active: 1971–1977, 1990s, 2000s
- Labels: Warner Brothers; Daffodil Records; Attic Records
- Members: Ed Pilling; Steve Pilling; Jim Crichton; Scott Shelson
- Past members: Brian Pilling; Mick Walsh; Tom Park; Greg Godovitz; Jorn (John) Andersen; Mick Hopkins; Peter Csanky; Gord Waszek; Peter Rochon; Doni Underhill; Pat Little; Ian McCorkle; Steve Negus

Fludd was a Canadian rock band in the 1970s. They placed six singles in the Canadian top 40 between 1971 and 1975, including "Turned 21" (1971), "Get Up, Get Out & Move On" (1971), "Cousin Mary" (1973) and "What An Animal" (1975). Members of Fludd went on to form the successful Canadian chart groups Goddo and Saga.

== History ==
=== Early years and first album (1960s–1971) ===
Fludd had its roots in a band called The Pretty Ones, formed by Ed Pilling and Greg Godovitz (not to be confused with the American band of the same name which eventually became Lynyrd Skynyrd). The band was briefly part of Toronto's Yorkville scene in the 1960s, but broke up before achieving much commercial success. Pilling and his brother Brian then moved to Birmingham, England, where they formed a band called Wages of Sin and made numerous appearances at major venues, eventually spending 1968 touring with Cat Stevens. When Stevens had to stop touring due to illness, the Pilling brothers returned to Toronto. Inspired by the then-emerging psychedelic blues rock sound of British acts such as Small Faces, they reunited with Godovitz, and recruited drummer John Andersen and guitarist Mick Walsh to create Fludd.

The band released its self-titled debut album in 1971, and had a modest chart hit, "Turned 21". Walsh left the band and was briefly replaced by Wages of Sin guitarist Mick Hopkins. The band's second single, "Get Up, Get Out, Move On", was released in 1972 but again charted only modestly, and they were dropped from their label, Warner Records. Hopkins returned to England, where he would later form the band Quartz.

=== Breakthrough success (1972) ===
Instead of recruiting another guitarist, Fludd added classically-trained keyboardist Peter Csanky, and signed a deal with Daffodil Records. They planned for their second album to be titled Cock On, and to feature a cover image of the band posing as flashers, wearing only overcoats, but the label's distributor, Capitol Records, was skittish and the plans were dropped; the album was instead released as ...On!

The album's singles, "Always Be Thinking of You", "Yes", and "C'mon, C'mon", did not perform much better on the charts, but received sufficient airplay that Daffodil kept the band on for a third album, sending them to Mike Oldfield's studios in England to record. Oldfield's simultaneous recording of Tubular Bells hampered their ability to book time in the studio, and the sessions were eventually scrapped. The delays also led Csanky to quit the band; he was replaced by the Canadian keyboardist Peter Rochon. With no new material to release, however, the label revisited ...On! in the hopes of pulling one more single; the song chosen, "Cousin Mary", became the band's breakthrough hit.

=== Later success and line-up changes (1973–1974) ===
The band began new recording sessions in Toronto, completing three songs in 1973: "I Held Out", "Brother and Me", and "Dance Gypsy Dance". "I Held Out" was released as a non-album single but failed to chart, and Daffodil dropped the band. Godovitz left, going on to form Goddo, and was replaced by Doni Underhill of the band Leigh Ashford. Brian Pilling was also diagnosed with leukemia around this time, and had difficulty meeting his commitments to the band due to treatment; while he did not leave the band outright, Underhill's bandmate Gord Waszek came on board as a second guitarist. Andersen took a brief hiatus from Fludd as well, and was temporarily replaced by Pat Little, but returned before the sessions for their next album. While Little was with the band, it played four four-hour concerts at Toronto's Varsity Stadium, receiving rave reviews.

=== Third album and winding down (1975–1977) ===
The band subsequently signed to Attic Records, who also bought out the non-album songs from the 1974 sessions; both songs were released as singles, with "Brother and Me" reaching the Top 30 but "Dance Gypsy Dance" failing to chart. They then began recording their third full album, Great Expectations, which was released on Attic in 1975. Bolstered by a controversial cover depicting a pregnant woman's bare belly, that album spawned the top-ten hit single "What an Animal".

Due to Brian Pilling's continued health problems, the band was unable to tour to properly support the album, so Waszek, Underhill, and Andersen left to form the band Fingers, while the Pillings carried on as a recording project with bassist Jim Crichton and drummer Ian McCorkle, recording and releasing the single "I'm On My Way" in 1975. Steve Negus replaced McCorkle in 1976 for the singles "Help Me Back" and "With You". However, with Brian Pilling's health continuing to deteriorate, the band called it quits after recording the 1976 singles, and Attic Records released the greatest hits compilation From the Attic '71 to '77 in 1977.

=== After Fludd ===
Crichton, Negus, and Rochon went on to form the band Saga. Waszek went on to join reunion lineups of Leigh Ashford and Motherlode, Andersen became a session musician, and Underhill went on to join Trooper.

Brian Pilling died of leukemia on June 28, 1978; he was just 28. As a benefit to raise money for his children, Godovitz put together a band of Toronto musicians, including Bob Segarini, to record a tribute single consisting of "Fortune in Men's Eyes", an unrecorded song he had previously written with Pilling, and a remake of Fludd's song "Homemade Lady".

Another greatest hits compilation, Greatest Expectations, was released in 1994 on Pacemaker Records, and ...On! was reissued in 2001 under its original planned title Cock On, on Unidisc Music.

Godovitz and Ed Pilling reunited in 1997, recording an album under the band name No Flies on Frank which is the name of a short story by John Lennon.

=== Fludd reunion in the 2000s ===
In the 2000s, a reunited Fludd has toured various classic rock festivals and other venues, with a lineup consisting of Ed Pilling, his younger brother Steve Pilling, Scott Shelson on bass guitar, and Jim Crichton. This lineup released a new CD, Fludd Lights, in 2006 for sale at their concert appearances, but the album has never been released on a commercial label.

In a January 2021 interview with Borderline Radio, Ed Pilling announced that he was working on a new album.

== Discography ==
=== Singles ===
Title	Release	Peak chart positions	Album
Title	Release	CAN	Album
"Turned 21"	1971	16	Fludd
"Get Up, Get Out, & Move On"	1972	34	Non-LP, later compiled on '71 To '77 - From The Attic
"Always Be Thinking of You"	1972	39	...On!
"Yes!"	1973	47	...On!
"C'mon C'mon"	1973	57	...On!
"Cousin Mary"	1973	17	...On!
"I Held Out"	1974	94	Great Expectations
"Brother & Me"	1974	29	Great Expectations
"Dance Gypsy Dance"	1974	58	Great Expectations
"What an Animal"	1975	11	Great Expectations
"I'm On My Way"	1975	79	Non-LP, later compiled on '71 To '77 - From The Attic
"Help Me Back"	1976	—	Non-LP, later compiled on '71 To '77 - From The Attic
"With You"	1977	—	Non-LP, later compiled on '71 To '77 - From The Attic
"—" denotes a recording that did not chart.

=== Albums ===
- Fludd (1971) #58 CAN
- ...On! (1972) #61 CAN
- Great Expectations (1975) #65 CAN
- From the Attic '71 to '77 (1977)
- Greatest Expectations (1994)
- Cock On! (2001)
- Fludd Lights (2006)
