= Quartz (British band) =

British heavy metal band

- Origin: Birmingham, England
- Genres: Heavy metal
- Years active: 1977–1984; 2011–present

Quartz are an English heavy metal band active during the new wave of British heavy metal. Their origins can be traced back to the mid-1970s.

== History ==
Quartz dates back to 1974 when they were known as Bandy Legs. Prior to the founding of Quartz, Hopkins had played in Wages of Sin, a short-lived Birmingham band that toured as a backing band for Cat Stevens in 1970. After that band's dissolution, two of his bandmates, expatriate Canadians Ed and Brian Pilling, returned to Canada and formed the band Fludd; Hopkins briefly joined that band in 1972 as a replacement for founding guitarist Mick Walsh, but left by the end of the year after they were dropped from their original record label.

== Touring and recording ==
Bandy Legs signed to Jet Records in 1976, and supported Black Sabbath and AC/DC. The band changed their name to Quartz for their 1977 debut album, Quartz. The album was produced by Tony Iommi and Quartz toured with Black Sabbath to support this release. Queen guitarist Brian May offered to do his "Queen" style editing of the song "Circles," but after several attempts he admitted that he thought the original version was still better; which also featured Ozzy Osbourne on backing vocals, but his contribution was cut from the final mix by Iommi. This track did not appear on the album, but was released as the B-side to the "Stoking the Fires of Hell" single, and as a bonus track when the Stand Up & Fight album was later reissued on CD in 2004 by Majestic Rock.

Quartz toured during this time, playing the Reading Festival three times (1977, 1978 and 1980) and touring in support of some of the larger hard rock bands: Iron Maiden, Saxon, UFO, Gillan and Rush.

In 1979, Geoff Nicholls left to join Black Sabbath. He contributed keyboards and songwriting to that band from 1980's Heaven and Hell to 2004.

Quartz released their second studio album, Stand Up and Fight, in 1980 and their third, Against All Odds, in 1983 before disbanding in 1984.

== Post-dissolution ==
In 2004, doom metal band Orodruin covered "Stand Up and Fight" on their album Claw Tower.

Quartz reformed in 2011 playing a reunion gig on 16 December 2011 at The Asylum in Birmingham, England. The line up consisted of Geoff Nicholls, Mike Hopkins, Derek Arnold, Malcolm Cope and former vocalist David Garner.

The band's original lead singer, Mike "Taffy" Taylor, died on 27 September 2016. Geoff Nicholls died at the age of 68, from lung cancer, on 28 January 2017.

== New album and compilation ==
In July 2014, the band announced a new album and compilation were in the works, "featuring previously unreleased studio material from the '80s, to be released later this year via Skol Records". The album, Quartz: Too Hot To Handle, was ultimately released on January 31, 2015.

In 2022, Quartz released their fifth studio album, On the Edge of No Tomorrow.

== Musical style ==
According to Metal Injection, "Quartz straddled the line between hard rock and heavy metal for many years. No matter—Quartz wrote songs muscular enough to appeal to both audiences".

== Members ==
=== Current ===
- David Garner - vocals (1982–1983 and 2011–present)
- Mick Hopkins - guitar (1974–present)
- Derek Arnold - bass (1974–1982 and 2011–present)
- Malcolm Cope - drums (1974–1984 and 2011–present)

=== Former ===
- Steve McLoughlin - bass (1982–1984)
- Geoff Nicholls - guitar/keyboards (1974–1979 and 2011–2017, died 2017)
- Geoff Bate - vocals (1983–1984)
- Mike "Taffy" Taylor - vocals (1974–1982, died 2016)

== Discography ==
=== Studio albums ===
- Quartz (Jet Records 1977, re-released in 1980 and renamed Deleted)
- Stand Up and Fight (MCA Records, 1980)
- Against All Odds (Heavy Metal Records, 1983)
- Fear No Evil (High Roller Records, 2016)
- On the Edge of No Tomorrow (HNE Recordings Ltd, 2022)

=== Singles ===
- "Street Fighting Lady" / "Mainline Riders" (Jet Records, 1977)
- "Satan's Serenade" / "Bloody Fool" / "Roll Over Beethoven" (live) (Logo Records, 1980)
- "Nantucket Sleighride" / "Wildfire" (Reddingtons Rare Records, 1980)
- "Stoking Up the Fires of Hell" / "Circles" (MCA Records. 1980)
- "Stand Up and Fight" / "Charlie Snow" (MCA Records, 1981)
- "Tell Me Why" / "Streetwalker" (Heavy Metal Records, 1983)

=== Live and compilation albums ===
- Live Quartz (Reddingtons Rare Records, 1980) - Recorded at Digbeth Civic Hall, Birmingham, England on 1 December 1979
- Resurrection (Neat Records, 1996) - live compilation, recorded 1976–1979
- Satan's Serenade (Castle Records, 2004) - live and studio tracks
- Live and Revisited (Self released, 2013) - live EP
- Too Hot to Handle (Skol Records, 2015) - Studio sessions 1981–1982

== See also ==
- List of new wave of British heavy metal bands
