= Ann-Margret (album) =

Disco album by Ann-Margret

Studio album by Ann-Margret
- Released: 1980
- Genre: Disco
- Label: MCA
- Producer: Paul Sabu

Ann-Margret chronology
| The Cowboy and the Lady (1969) | Ann-Margret (1980) | God Is Love: The Gospel Sessions (2002) |

Singles from Ann-Margret
- 1. "Love Rush" Released: 1979; 2. "Midnight Message" Released: 1980

Ann-Margret is a disco album by Swedish-American actress and singer Ann-Margret released by MCA Records in 1980. It was her first album in over a decade. The album was written, arranged and produced by Paul Sabu. The album was re-released digitally as Love Rush in 2007.

Two singles were lifted from the album, "Love Rush", which peaked at No. 8 on the Billboard Disco chart in 1979. The follow-up single, "Midnight Message", peaked at No. 12 in 1980. Ann-Margret and Sabu collaborated on an additional single, "Everybody Needs Somebody Sometimes" in 1981, which peaked at No. 22 on the Disco chart.

== Critical reviews ==
Professional ratings
Review scores
| Source | Rating |
|---|---|
| AllMusic | 3.5/5 stars |

In their review of the album, Billboard stated that "the veteran siren sounds like she's having a ball on steamy numbers like 'What I Do to Men' and 'Love Rush'...the album is fun, succeeding comically as much as musically."

AllMusic noted that the album "isn't half bad ... Ann-Margret oozes sex, her breathy voice proving an ideal fit with disco's erotic sensibilities. Sabu's conga rhythms and funky guitar are no less critical to the end result -- it's a novelty record, sure, but a damn good one."

Record World complemented the singer's "whispery vocals" and Sabu's production "a thundering foundation of instrumentation", highlighting "Midnight Message" as a "disco-ish standout."

In their review of "Love Rush", Cashbox noted "a whirlwind-paced disco beat, led by congas and a variety of percussion effects, is augmented by a battery of strings, electric piano and horn flourishes to provide a sonically scintillating background for Ann-Margret's aggressively sexy vocal stylings. An auspicious introduction to dance music for the actress/singer, the clubs will hop on this, as will disco and pop lists."

== Track listing ==
1. "Midnight Message" - 6:53
2. "What I Do To Men" - 6:07
3. "Love Rush" - 6:06
4. "Never Gonna Let You Go" - 5:03
5. "For You" - 4.50

== Personnel ==
- Ann-Margret – vocals
- Paul Sabu - production, arrangement, guitar
- Rick Bozzo - bass
- Dan Homes - drums
- Sara Kane - backing vocals
- Pat Henderson - backing vocals
- Billie Barnum - backing vocals
