= Tony Springer =

Toney Springer
- Born: Trinidad and Tobago
- Origin: Canada
- Genre: Blues-rock
- Instrument: Guitarist
- Label: Guitar

Toney "Wild T" Springer is a Trinidadian/Canadian blues-rock guitarist.

== Early life ==
Springer was born and raised in Trinidad and Tobago; he played with a number of reggae and calypso bands as a teenager.

== Career ==
Springer later moved to Canada, settling in Toronto and playing local clubs in a Jimi Hendrix tribute band. He joined Rough Trade in 1986 as the band was becoming less active; they broke up in 1988.

In 1990, Springer took on the stage name Wild T, and launched his own band, Wild T and the Spirit. In 1992, Wild T was nominated for a Juno Award as Most Promising Male Vocalist at the Juno Awards of 1992. Springer also appeared as a guest musician on David Bowie's 1993 album Black Tie White Noise.

Wild T and the Spirit had several lineups over the years, and released a number of albums, including Givin' Blood, which was nominated for a Juno Award in 1994. The band toured in Europe, Canada and the United States, and continues to perform and record as of 2017.
