= Lee Aaron (album) =

Studio album by Lee Aaron
- Released: February 17, 1987
- Studio: Metalworks, Mississauga
- Genre: Hard rock
- Length: 43:11
- Label: Attic
- Producer: Peter Coleman

Lee Aaron chronology
Call of the Wild (1985)	Lee Aaron (1987)	Bodyrock (1989)

Singles from Lee Aaron
- 1. "Powerline" Released: 1987; 2. "Only Human" Released: 17 February 1987; 3. "Goin' Off the Deep End" Released: 2 June 1987; 4. "Dream with Me" Released: 14 September 1987

Lee Aaron is the fourth studio album by the Canadian rock singer Lee Aaron, released on February 17, 1987, through Attic Records; a remastered edition was reissued in 2002 through Unidisc Music. It is Aaron's third-highest-charting album, reaching No. 39 on the Canadian albums chart and remaining on that chart for seventeen weeks, as well as reaching the top 60 in three other countries. Two singles reached the Canadian singles chart: "Only Human" at No. 44 and "Goin' Off the Deep End" at No. 93.

== Critical reception ==
Professional ratings
Review scores
Source	Rating
AllMusic	3/5 stars

Glenn Miller at AllMusic described Lee Aaron as "refreshing, showcasing the best songwriting and strongest music of [Aaron's] career", and that she "succeeds in this softer, commercial vein with mature subject matter."

== Track listing ==
No.	Title	Writer(s)	Length
1.	"Powerline"	Lee Aaron, John Albani, Joe Lynn Turner	3:50
2.	"Hands Are Tied"	Aaron, Albani, Turner, Mark Muller	3:50
3.	"Only Human"	Aaron, Albani, David Roberts	3:46
4.	"Empty Heart"	Aaron, Albani	3:07
5.	"Number One"	Aaron, Albani, Turner	3:54
6.	"Don't Rain on My Parade"	Aaron, Albani, Marc Ribler	3:29
7.	"Goin' Off the Deep End"	Aaron, Albani, Marc Ribler	4:21
8.	"If This Is Love"	R. W. Johnson, Carl Wilson	4:17
9.	"Eye for an Eye"	Aaron, Albani, Roberts	3:47
10.	"Heartbeat of the World"	Johnny Warman, Julia Downes	4:20
11.	"Dream with Me"	Aaron, Albani, Dan Hill, Chris Brockway	4:30
Total length:			43:11

== Personnel ==
- Lee Aaron – lead vocals, backing vocals, arrangement
- John Albani – guitar, background vocals, arrangement
- Jim Gelcer – keyboard, background vocals, arrangement
- Randy Cooke – drums, percussion, arrangement
- Chris Brockway – bass, background vocals, arrangement
- David Roberts – background vocals (tracks 3, 5), arrangement
- Peter Coleman – arrangement, producer

== Chart performance ==
=== Album ===
Chart	Entered	Peak	Peak reached	Weeks at peak	Weeks on chart
Canadian albums chart	March 7, 1987	39	May 9, 1987	2	17
Swedish albums chart	March 25, 1987	26	March 25, 1987	1	1
Swiss albums chart	March 29, 1987	28	March 29, 1987	1	1
German albums chart	1987	51	1987	7	

=== Singles ===
Single	Chart	Entered	Peak	Peak reached	Weeks at peak	Weeks on chart
"Only Human"	Canadian singles chart	March 7, 1987	44	May 23, 1987	1	10
"Goin' Off the Deep End"	Canadian singles chart	June 27, 1987	93	July 4, 1987	1	3
