= Killer Dwarfs =

Canadian rock band

- Origin: Oshawa, Ontario, Canada
- Genres: Hard rock, heavy metal, glam metal
- Years active: 1981–1997, 2001–present
- Members: Russell Dwarf Graham; Darrell Millar; Gerry Finn; Johnny Fenton
- Past members: Ange Fodero; Bryce Trewin; Mike Hall; Ronald "Bad Ronbo" Mayer; Stan Miczek
- Website: killerdwarfsband.com

Killer Dwarfs (stylized as KiLLeR DWaRfS) is a Canadian hard rock band that formed in late 1981 in Oshawa, Ontario, and enjoyed moderate success in their native Canada in the 1980s. The band is known for its offbeat sense of humour (all band members adopted the surname "Dwarf") and was nominated for two Juno Awards during its career. Killer Dwarfs were sometimes compared to NWOBHM acts such as Iron Maiden and Saxon.

== History ==
Before The Killer Dwarfs formed, the band consisted of Darrell Millar, Bryce Trewin, and Ange Fodero in a group called Sphinx. After Sphinx, Russ Graham entered the picture and they became The Killer Dwarfs. The original line-up consisted of Russ Graham (vocals) and Darrell Millar (drums), along with Bryce Trewin (guitar) and Ange Fodero (bass). Their self-titled 1983 debut album was nominated for a Juno Award and radio stations in the US, particularly in Texas, started to play the album.

Trewin and Fodero left the band shortly afterward and were replaced by guitarist Mike Hall and bassist Ron Mayer. This line-up released the band's breakthrough 1986 album Stand Tall, followed by Big Deal in 1988 and Dirty Weapons in 1990. The band received much recognition in Canada and the United States during the 1980s, and its videos were in regular rotation at MuchMusic and on the MTV program Headbangers Ball. Gerry Finn replaced Hall in 1992, and the album Method to the Madness was released later that year. The band toured for several years but then parted ways.

During the mid-to-late 1990s, the band members pursued other projects. Graham formed a band called PennyBlack, and Hall and Finn both became members of the Canadian metal band Helix. Millar went on to drum for the southern rock band Laidlaw before forming his own Bon Scott era AC/DC tribute band Autobon, which went on to become Automan.ca, which provided Millar with a vehicle for recording original material. Mayer became a businessman and moved to the U.S.

In 2001, the line-up of Graham, Millar, Hall and Mayer reunited to tour across North America. Recordings from these shows make up the live album Reunion of Scribes: Live 2001. Bass player Mayer left the band in 2003, replaced by Stan Miczek, who adopted the name "Smokin’ Stan Dwarf". The group went on another hiatus in 2005. Michael Hall went on to form the band Balls Deep with Stan Miczek on bass, while Russell joined Moxy. In 2013, Graham released Wireless, a collection of acoustic versions of popular Killer Dwarfs songs with guest musicians.

In 2013, Graham, Millar, and Finn reunited, joined by new bass player Johnny Fenton, formerly of the Toronto thrash/death metal band Solus. The group released the album Start @ One, which had been recorded in 1993 but never released.

On May 26, 2014, the band was returning home after concluding a US tour at the Rocklahoma festival in Pryor, Oklahoma. While passing through a construction zone along Interstate 70 in Indiana, the band's pick-up truck, driven by drummer Johnny Fenton, struck two other vehicles and crashed into a ditch. Graham was airlifted to a hospital in Terre Haute where he received 24 stitches to close a gash on the left side of his forehead. The rest of the band walked away with cuts and bruises. In a radio interview a month later, Graham said he was healing well, but the area around the gash was still completely numb.

On January 5, 2018, it was announced that Killer Dwarfs had signed to Megadeth bassist David Ellefson's EMP Label Group, which would release a Killer Dwarfs' live album called NO GUFF. EMP also announced that it would reissue the band's independently released START@ONE and vocalist Graham's solo debut Wireless, plus new 2019 studio albums from Killer Dwarfs and Russ Dwarf.

The original lineup of Graham, Millar, Trewin, and Fodero reunited for a special mini-set during the band’s show at the Bitmore Theatre in Oshawa, Ontario, Canada on November 10, 2023.

== Band members ==
=== Current ===
- Russ Graham – vocals, guitar (1981-present)
- Gerry Finn - lead guitar (1992-present)
- Darrell Millar - drums (1981-present)
- Johnny Fenton - bass (2013-present)

=== Former ===
- Bryce Trewin – lead guitar (1981–1984, 2001-2005, 2023)
- Ange Fodero – bass (1981-1984, 2023)
- Mike Hall – lead guitar (1984–1990, 2001)
- Ron Mayer – bass (1981–1990, 2001-2003)
- Stan Miczek - bass (2003-2005, live only)

== Discography ==
=== Studio albums ===
Title	Album details	Chart	
Title	Album details	CAN	US
Killer Dwarfs	Released: 1983; Label: Attic Records	—	—
Stand Tall	Released: 1986; Label: Maze Records	—	—
Big Deal	Released: 1988; Label: Epic Records	90	165
Dirty Weapons	Released: 1990; Label: Epic	—	151
Method to the Madness	Released: 1992; Label: Epic	—	—
Start @ One	Released: 2013; Label: Smoothline Entertainment	—	—
"-" denotes a recording that did not chart or was not released in that territory.

=== Live albums ===
Title	Album details	Chart	
Title	Album details	CAN	US
Reunion of Scribes: Live 2001	Released: 2002; Label: Bullseye Records Of Canada	—	—
Live No Guff!	Released: 2018 (recorded 2016); Label: EMP Label Group	—	—
"-" denotes a recording that did not chart or was not released in that territory.

=== Singles ===
- "Stand Tall" (1986)
- "Keep the Spirit Alive" (1986)
- "We Stand Alone" (1988)
- "Doesn't Matter" (1990)
- "Dirty Weapons" (1990)
- "Hard Luck Town" (1992)
- "Driftin' Back" (1992)

== See also ==
- Canadian rock
- Music of Canada
- Category:Canadian rock music groups
- List of Canadian musicians
- List of bands from Canada
