= Cats Can Fly =

Canadian pop-rock band

- Origin: North York (Toronto), Ontario, Canada
- Genres: Pop rock
- Years active: 1982–1987
- Label: CBS Records
- Past members: David Ashley; Mitchell James; Peter Alexander; Eddie Zeeman

Cats Can Fly was a Canadian pop rock band active in the 1980s. They released one album in 1986.

Cats Can Fly began as a school rock band called Ethos at Elia Junior High School (now Elia Middle School) in North York, Ontario in 1971. The original members were Jim Longmuir on guitar, Alan Frizell on guitar, Frank Miller on drums and Peter Alexander on bass guitar. The band was formed under the supervision of school board consultant Laura Lapedus. In the following year, Mitchell James replaced Longmuir and Frizell left. David Ashley replaced Alexander on bass guitar and he switched to keyboards.

After a US-based band with the same name released an album, the group changed its name to Scamp. Miller eventually left the group and was replaced by Tom Davidson. Scamp toured Canada as a bar band and had limited success including touring with Burton Cummings, winning the CFTR Talent Search and appearing on Global at Noon. Lapedus eventually became the band's co-manager along with Wayne Baguley and Warren Keach.

In 1980, Scamp recorded an album with the producer Jack Richardson. Distribution could not be established, however, and the record was never released.

After a series of drummers including Geoff Geddes, Phil Knipe and Bill Hibbs, Eddie Zeeman became the band's permanent drummer in 1982. Scamp changed its name to Cats Can Fly shortly thereafter. In its final form it consisted of Ashley on lead vocals and bass guitar, James on backing vocals and lead guitar, Alexander on backing vocals and keyboards and Zeeman on backing vocals and drums. They released an independent EP, Touch Touch, in 1984 and were signed to CBS Records after winning a cross-Canada talent search sponsored by Craven A. (The same talent search also led to a recording contract for Belinda Metz.)

Their album Cats Can Fly was released on CBS Records in 1986. Co-produced by Lou Pomanti and Lenny DeRose, the album spawned the singles "Flipping to the A Side", "Lies Are Gonna Get Ya" and "Cold Hands, Warm Heart", the former eventually climbing to #16 on the charts while the latter two would each peak at #88. They toured across Canada to support the album, both as a headlining act and as an opener for several Canadian shows by Level 42. The album spent a total of 20 weeks on the charts and peaked at #48. The band garnered a Juno Award nomination for Most Promising Group at the Juno Awards of 1986.

Despite their success, CBS dropped the band in a major housecleaning that preceded its 1988 takeover by Sony Music Entertainment. They spent some time shopping for another record label, but subsequently broke up.

== Discography ==
=== Studio albums ===
- Touch Touch (EP) (1984)
- Cats Can Fly (1986) - CAN #48

=== Singles ===
- "Father Was a Foreigner" / "Touch Touch" (1984)
- "Flippin' to the 'A' Side" (1986) - CAN #16
- "Lies Are Gonna Get Ya" (1986) - CAN #88
- "Cold Hands, Warm Heart" (1986) - CAN #88
