= Greg Godovitz =

Canadian bassist and vocalist (born 1951)

- Born: March 20, 1951 (age 75); Toronto, Ontario, Canada
- Genres: Hard rock
- Occupations: Musician, songwriter
- Instruments: Bass, Guitar
- Years active: 1964 – present
- Website: http://www.goddo.ca/

Greg Godovitz (born March 20, 1951) is a Canadian musician, best known as the bassist and vocalist of the power trio, Goddo. Prior to his success with Goddo, Godovitz was a founding member of Fludd and played in Sherman and Peabody with Buzz Shearman of Moxy and Gil Moore of Triumph.
