= Alexander Mair (music) =

Alexander Mair (September 29, 1940 - November 25, 2022) was a Canadian music industry executive, most noted as a founder of the Attic Records label.

== Background ==
Born and raised in Toronto, Ontario, he worked in a record store and as a disc jockey at parties in his teenage years. After having taken just one accounting class at the University of Toronto, he was hired by Capitol Records in its royalty payment tracking department, later claiming that he got the job because he knew how to pronounce the names of classical music composers.

== Career in music ==
He began to work in music promotion with Apex Records in the early 1960s. In 1967 he won an RPM award for Top Regional Record Promoter.

By 1968, Mair was the business manager for singer-songwriter Gordon Lightfoot, playing a key role in setting up Lightfoot's production and publishing companies, and was active in trying to help other aspiring musicians secure record deals.

Mair and Tom Williams set up Attic Records in 1974, quickly growing it into the largest and most influential Canadian independent record label of its era. He retained ownership of the label until 1999, when he sold his shares to Allan Gregg's Song Corporation.

During his career, he also played key roles in the creation of the Canadian Independent Record Production Association, the Canadian Musical Reproduction Rights Association and the National Aboriginal Music Association, and held board and leadership roles with the Composers, Authors and Publishers Association of Canada, the Society of Composers, Authors and Music Publishers of Canada, the Canadian Music Publishers Association and Massey Hall.

He later established MHL Communications, a company which published the music trade magazine Applaud!.

== Honours ==
In 2022, he was named a Member of the Order of Canada. Due to his poor health, he was presented with his OC insignia by Elizabeth Dowdeswell in his hospital room at Sunnybrook Health Sciences Centre just days before his death.

At the Juno Awards of 2026, he posthumously received the Walt Grealis Special Achievement Award in honour of his career.
