= Paul Sabu =

American singer

Paul Sabu (born January 2, 1951) is an American singer, songwriter, producer, and guitarist. He is the son of actors Sabu and Marilyn Cooper.

== Career ==
Sabu first gained recognition in the late 1970s as a producer and performer of disco music. In the 1970s and 1980s he produced disco albums by Ann-Margret, Debbie Jacobs, and Sister Power featuring Gwen Jonae. Sabu is also known for his work with his band Only Child. His music has been featured in movies and television series soundtracks, and he has been credited with production/mixing on 14 platinum and 11 gold records.

== Notable mentions ==
- 2004 Kerrang Magazine voted Paul Sabu Top 5 favorite AOR vocalists of All Time
- 2005 Only Child's self-titled debut album from 1989 voted No. 22 on the Best AOR Albums of All Time
- 2011 Classic Rock Magazine awarded Paul Sabu the highest-rated AOR Album of All Time

== Discography ==
=== Official releases ===
- Sabu: Ocean/Ariola Records (1979).
- Sabu: MCA Records (1980).
- Kidd Glove: Motown (1984), also re-released (with bonus material) at Yesterrock.
- Heartbreak: Heavy Metal America (1985), also re-released (with bonus material) at Z Records.
- Only Child: Rhino/Capital (1988), also re-released (with bonus material) at Yesterrock.
- Paul Sabu: Zero (1994), also re-released (with bonus material) at Z Records as "In Dreams".
- Sabu: USG Records (1996).
- Between the Light: USG Records (1998).
- Strange Messiah: AOR Heaven (2007).
- High & Mighty: AOR Heaven (2009).
- Call of the Wild: Z Records (2011).
- Bangkok Rules: Z Records (2012).
- Banshee: Frontiers Music SRL (2022).

=== Album / song producer and contributor credits ===
- Alexa - Alexa (1989)
- Alice Cooper - Hey Stoopid (1991), Spark In The Dark: The Best Of (2009)
- Ann-Margret - Ann-Margret (1980)
- AOR - L.A. Temptation (2012), L.A. Connection (2014), Return To L.A. (2015), L.A. Darkness (2016)
- David Bowie - Dance (1985)
- Dennis Churchill Dries - I (AOR Heaven, 2015)
- Fatal Smile - World Domination (2008)
- Glass Tiger - Don't Forget Me (When I'm Gone) (1986)
- Heart - Heart (1985)
- Jesse Damon - The Hand That Rocks (2003), Rebel Within (2006)
- John Waite - Ignition (1982)
- Kelsey Lu - Blood (Sony Records, 2019)
- Kim Carnes - Crazy In The Night (1990)
- Lee Aaron - Bodyrock (1989), Some Girls Do (1991), The Best Of (1997)
- Little America - Little America (1987), Fairgrounds (1989)
- Little Caesar - Little Caesar (1990)
- Malice - Crazy In The Night (1989)
- Motels, The - Vacancy: Best Of (1990)
- Paul Sabu - Kidd Glove (1984), Heartbreak (1985), Only Child (1988), Paul Sabu (1994), Sabu (1996), Between The Light (1998), Strange Messiah (2008), High & Mighty (2009), Call Of The Wild (2011), Bangkok Rules (2012), Banshee (2022)
- Quiet Riot - Quiet Riot 10 (RSM, 2014)
- Robbie Nevil - Wot's It To Ya (1986), Wot's It To Ya: The Best of Robbie Nevil (1999)
- (Eilleen) Shania Twain - Beginnings (1988), Final Beginnings (1991)
- Secret Society - Induction (AMG Sony, 2018)
- Silent Rage - Shattered Hearts (1987), Don't Touch Me There (1989)
- Special EFX - Frontline (1986)
- Tattoo Rodeo - Rode Hard Put Away Wet (1991)
- THEM - Manor Of The Se7en Gables (SPV/Steam Hammer, 2018)
- Throne of Vengeance - Flesh Engine (2011), Live Evil (2013)
- Vapors, The - Turning Japanese (1980)
- VA - Elvira Presents Monster Hits (1994), Elvira Presents Revenge of the Monster Hits (1995), Hard Rock Zombies Soundtrack (2008)
- W.A.S.P. - Live... in the Raw (1987)

=== Music in film and TV credits ===
- Accused, The (1988)
- Baywatch (2001)
- Beverly Hills 90210 (3 Seasons)
- Child's Wish, A (1997)
- Ghost Town (1988)
- Ghoulies II (1987)
- "Hard Rock Zombies" (1985)
- Kids In The Hall, The (2010)
- Meatballs 4 (1992)
- New Mickey Mouse Club, The (1993)
- Million Dollar Mystery (1987)
- Music Is Communication (1986)
- New WKRP in Cincinnati, The (1991-1993)
- Real Men (1987)
- Reason For Living (1990)
- Sex and the City, Season 4 (2001)
- To Die For (1995)
- Twin Sitters (1995)
- Vice Squad (1982)
- Vice Versa (1988)
- Kindred: The Embraced (1996)
