= Emotional Rain =

Studio album by Lee Aaron
- Released: August 3, 1994
- Recorded: March–May 1994 at Metalworks Studios in Mississauga, Ontario, Canada; December 1994 at Mushroom Studios in Vancouver, British Columbia, Canada
- Genre: Hard rock
- Length: 50:00
- Label: A&M
- Producer: Lee Aaron, Mark S. Berry, John Albani

Lee Aaron chronology
Some Girls Do (1991)	Emotional Rain (1994)	2preciious (1996)

Alternative cover
- European edition

Alternative cover
- 2004 reissue

Emotional Rain is the seventh studio album by singer Lee Aaron, released on August 3, 1994 through A&M Records (Canada) and in 1995 through Koch Entertainment (Europe); it was later reissued in 2004 through Solid Gold Records.

== Track listing ==
No.	Title	Writer(s)	Length
1.	"Odds of Love"	Lee Aaron, John Albani	4:39
2.	"Baby Go Round"	Aaron, Albani	4:24
3.	"Fire in Your Flame"	Aaron, Albani	4:35
4.	"Waterfall"	Aaron, Albani	4:05
5.	"Inside"	Aaron, Albani	3:40
6.	"Raggedy Jane"	Aaron, Albani	3:28
7.	"Soul in Motion"	Aaron, Albani	4:39
8.	"Emotional Rain"	Aaron, Albani	4:18
9.	"Judgement Day"	Aaron, Albani, Anthony Vandeburg	4:16
10.	"Heaven"	Aaron, Albani	4:37
11.	"Cry"	Aaron, Albani, Vandeburg	4:16
12.	"Had Enough"	Aaron, Albani, Vandeburg	3:03
Total length:			50:00

European edition bonus tracks
No.	Title	Writer(s)	Length
13.	"Concrete & Ice"	Aaron, Don Harrison, Don Binns, Don Short	3:54
14.	"Strange Alice"	Aaron, Harrison, Binns, Short	4:46

== Personnel ==
- Lee Aaron – vocals, background vocals, mixing, executive production
- John Albani – guitar (except tracks 13, 14), mixing, production
- Knox Chandler – guitar (except tracks 13, 14)
- Reeves Gabrels – guitar (except tracks 13, 14)
- Don Harrison – guitar (tracks 13–14)
- Don Short – drums
- Daniel Mansilla – additional percussion
- Don Binns – bass
- Kim Deschamp – mandolin
- Billy Newton-Davis – background vocals
- Mischke – background vocals
- Brad Nelson – engineering, mixing
- Mark Berry – engineering, mixing
- L. Stu Young – engineering
- Graham Brewer – engineering
- David Tedesco – engineering
- Ray Gilliland – engineering
- Keith Stein – engineering
- Peter Wonsiak – engineering
- Mark S. Berry – mixing, production
