= Joe Cerisano =

American singer-songwriter and producer

Joe Cerisano is an American singer, songwriter, record producer and president of Outta' the Woods Records. He experienced his first taste of mainstream success as the frontman for the chart-making early 1980s rock band, Silver Condor and has gone on to appear as the featured vocalist on numerous other artists' albums, one-off recordings, and commercials since then.

== Early life ==
Cerisano began performing professionally at the age of 14, being underage but still singing at local speakeasies where liquor was sold in the state of West Virginia. Even before he was old enough to be in these clubs, he was singing with a succession of regional bands in the north central West Virginia area. In 1968 Joe was asked to join The Bonnevilles, led by Dave Coombs, who were popular at West Virginia University and played at Somers Point, New Jersey in the summer. The Bonnevilles played seven night a week with matinees on Saturday and Sunday from 3 pm to 2 am as Cerisano began earning his stripes as a real trouper. Coming home at the end of the summer called for a break. In the spring of 1969, Coombs called Joe again to possibly start another group which turned out to be Kabosse, which eventually morphed into Elderberry Jak. Elderberry Jak secured a record deal with Kenny Rogers' brother Leland in Memphis. Cerisano moved to New Jersey and became a resident of Warren Township.

== Career ==
In the mid-1970s Joe was lead singer for a popular local rock band, Copper Lake, which often played at "The Numbers" (The 615 Musical Lounge) in York, Pennsylvania. In the late 1970s, Joe Cerisano and his guitarist/co-leader Lee Fink had one of the top original groups in a sea of cover bands in the New Jersey rock club scene. R-Band drew large crowds due to their original songs, which was rare for the time. Playing seven nights a week took its toll on the band, so in December 1979, after a call from Earl Slick, Joe left New Jersey and headed to California. Three months later, Joe and Earl formed the rock band Silver Condor, who signed a lucrative record deal with Columbia Records. The songs that secured this deal were written for R-Band in New Jersey. The band's self-titled debut album, released in 1981, featured a top 40 hit, "You Could Take My Heart Away." After the breakup of Silver Condor, Joe returned to New York City in 1984.

His commercial work in television and radio singing includes spots for Coca-Cola, Chrysler/Plymouth, General Electric, Miller Beer, the United States Army, the United States Navy and numerous others. During this period, Cerisano also did backing vocals on several albums by Michael Bolton, and he was the singer of the 1986 song "Hands Across America". The video was featured on MTV and still is being played on Pop-up Video and VH1.

On their Imaginos album, Blue Öyster Cult featured Cerisano as the lead singer for the song, "The Siege and Investiture of Baron von Frankenstein's Castle at Weisseria". He and Gloria Estefan appeared together on the soundtrack of the 1988 musical, Goya; A Life in Song. In 1998, Cerisano was one of the lead vocalists chosen by the Trans-Siberian Orchestra to be featured on their album, The Christmas Attic and also was one of the featured lead vocalists on their tours from 2000 through 2003. Cerisano sang backup for the rock band Korn in November 1999, as they introduced their new album, Issues.

In April 2000, Cerisano appeared on West Virginia Mountain Stage at Fairmont State College in Fairmont, West Virginia. Other invited guests on stage that evening included Eric Weissberg, who performed with Cerisano. The live performance was taped and later broadcast.
