= Silver Condor (band) =

Soft rock band led by Joe Cerisano

- Origin: California, U.S.
- Genres: Rock; Pop rock; Arena rock
- Years active: 1981-1983
- Labels: Columbia
- Spinoffs: Autograph
- Past members: Joe Cerisano; Earl Slick; John Corey; Jay Davis; Claude Pepper; Kenny Aaronson; Nick Brown; Steve Plunkett; Steve Goldstein; Craig Krampf; Waddy Wachtel

Silver Condor was an American album-oriented soft rock band from California, active from 1981 to 1983. They released two albums, Silver Condor (1981) and Trouble at Home (1983). They made their only Billboard Hot 100 appearance with a song off of their first album, "You Could Take My Heart Away," which reached #32 in 1981.

== History ==
The band's line-up shifted considerably between their first and second albums, with lead singer Joe Cerisano being the only constant member. The first incarnation of the band also featured the guitarist Earl Slick. The second album featured well-known bassist Kenny Aaronson as well as future Autograph frontman Steve Plunkett on rhythm guitar.

== Discography ==
=== Albums ===
1981	Silver Condor: Label: Columbia; Format: LP, CD, CS
1983	Trouble at Home: Label: Columbia; Format: LP, CD, CS

=== Singles ===
Release	Title	Peak chart positions
Release	Title	US
1981	"You Could Take My Heart Away"	32
1981	"Carolina (Nobody's Right, Nobody's Wrong)"	—
1983	"When A Man Loves A Woman"	—

== Line-up ==
=== Timeline ===
Also features several guest appearances:

- Clarence Clemons: tenor sax
- Rick Derringer: guitar
- Neal Schon: guitar
