= Ridin' High (Moxy album) =

Studio album by Moxy
- Released: 1977
- Recorded: March 1977 Toronto
- Genres: Hard rock; heavy metal
- Length: 33:43
- Label: Mercury
- Producers: Jack Douglas, Edward Leonetti

Moxy chronology
Moxy II (1976)	Ridin' High (1977)	Under the Lights (1978)

Professional ratings
Review scores
Source	Rating
Allmusic	2.5/5 stars

Ridin' High is the third album by the Canadian rock band Moxy, released in 1977. The record got good reviews and got the band nominated for a Juno Award (Canada's Grammy) in 1977 for Most Promising Group of the Year. The album produced two Texas hit songs "Are You Ready", and "Ridin' High", as for Canada the album was considered too hard/heavy for Canadian radio at the time and consequently only the slowest paced song "Another Time Another Place" received any airplay in the band's home country. The album still sold well in Canada and especially in Southern USA because of strong live appearances that included shows with AC/DC and Trooper.

In the words of Earl Johnson "I remember going in doing radio interviews and Ridin High was the single and they would put it on and all the needles would just go tilt over right into the red and the station engineer would be freaking out. And I'm going, we're not going to get any airplay with this. I just knew it. And you know, we were a concert act",

== Credits ==
- Buzz Shearman: vocals
- Earl Johnson: Guitar - Slide guitar
- Buddy Caine: Guitar - Electric guitar
- Bill Wade: drums
- Terry Juric: Bass
- Jack Douglas - Producer
- Edward Leonetti - Producer
- Mike Jones - Engineer
- Recorded in Toronto at Sounds Interchange in March 1977.
- Mixed in New York City at The Record Plant in March 1977.

== Track listing ==
Are You Ready (1977)
Are You Ready From 1977 Album Ridin' High By Buddy Caine, Buzz Shearman

I'll Set You on Fire (1977)
"I'll Set You on Fire " From 1977 Album Ridin' High, By Buddy Caine

1. "Nothin' Comes Easy" - 4:22 (Earl Johnson)
2. "Rock Baby" - 4:48 (Earl Johnson)
3. "Sweet Reputation (Symphony for Margaret)" - 3:54 (Buzz Shearman, Bill Wade, Earl Johnson)
4. "I'll Set You on Fire" - 3:17 (Buddy Caine)
5. "Ridin' High" - 4:03 (Earl Johnson)
6. "Young Legs" - 3:46 (Bill Wade)
7. "Another Time Another Place" - 4:39 (Earl Johnson)
8. "Are You Ready" - 3:52 (Buddy Caine, Buzz Shearman)
9. "Nothin' Comes Easy (Reprise)" - 1:02 (Earl Johnson)

== Singles ==
- 1977 Ridin’ High/I’ll Set You On Fire (Polydor) 2065-353
- 1977 Rock ‘N’ Roll Volume 1 [4-song 7″ EP] (Polydor – BRAZIL) 2229-203

== Appearance on compilations ==
- 1999 “Wet Suit” on ‘The Ultimate DEEP PURPLE – Fire, Ice & Dynamite Vol.1’ (Teichitsu Entertainment – SOUTH KOREA) TEP-02112MP

== Reissued ==
Moxy’s original catalogue of albums were again available starting in 1994 when Valerie Shearman (Buzz's widow) oversaw the release of all of Moxy's back catalogue of albums.

- 1977 Ridin’ High (Polydor) 2480-402
- 1984 Ridin’ High/Change In My Life [7″] (Ahed) AH-1010
- 1984 Ridin’ High/Change In My Life [12”] (Ahed) A12-1
- 1995 Ridin’ High [reissue] (Pacemaker) PACE-018
- 2022 Ridin’ High [LP reissue] (Unidisc) AGEK-2243LP
