= Goddo =

Canadian rock band

- Origin: Scarborough, Ontario, Canada
- Genres: Rock
- Years active: 1975–1981; 1989–2018
- Labels: Polydor; Attic; Justin Entertainment; Mausoleum Records; Bullseye Records of Canada
- Past members: Greg Godovitz; Doug Inglis; Gino Scarpelli; Marty Morin

Goddo is a Canadian rock band formed in Scarborough, Ontario, in 1975. Goddo had mixed major label success from the mid-1970s to the early 1980s. After reforming in 1989, they revived their career with several new studio and 'best of' packages. Goddo signed to Bullseye Records of Canada. Goddo disbanded after their last show on December 15, 2018, at the Phoenix Concert Theatre in Toronto. Goddo's last show with the original recording lineup of Greg Godovitz (lead vocals, bass, guitars), Gino Scarpelli (guitars, backing vocals, bass), and Doug Inglis (drums, backing vocals, percussion) was at Spot 1 Grill & Music Hall, Brampton, in October 2018.

== Discography ==
=== Studio albums ===
- Goddo (1977)
- If Indeed It's Lonely at the Top... WHO CARES... It's Lonely at the Bottom Too! (1978)
- An Act of Goddo (1979) CAN No.82
- Pretty Bad Boys (1981) CAN No. 45
- 12 Gauge Goddo (1990)
- King of Broken Hearts (1992)
- Kings of the Stoned Age (2003)

=== Live albums ===
- Lighve: Best Seat in the House (1980) CAN No. 26
- 2nd Best Seat in the House - Lighve (2004)
- Under My Hat - Volume 1: Active Goddo (2008)

=== Singles ===
- "Louie Louie" (1975) CAN No. 75
- "Under My Hat" (1977)
- "There Goes My Baby" (1978)
- "Chantal" (1979)
- "Fortune in Men's Eyes" (1980)
- "Pretty Bad Boy" (1981) CAN No. 21
- "If Tomorrow Never Comes" (1981)
- "Was It Something I Said" (1993)
- "Rock Star" (2004)
- "Such a Fool" (2004)
