= Lenny DeRose =

- Occupations: Studio engineer, music producer

Lenny DeRose is a studio engineer and music producer who has been credited on several recordings dating back to the early 1980s.

As an engineer, he has been credited for his work on several film soundtracks, including Naked in New York, 9½ Weeks, among others. DeRose has been nominated for several Juno Awards for his work, and has produced every recording released by The Philosopher Kings. In 1995, he received the Recording Engineer of the Year award for his work with the band. Releases for 2012 include Elise LeGrow, The Tragically Hip, Metric, Hey Ocean!, Walk Off the Earth, Whosarmy, and The Barenaked Ladies.

== Performers ==
DeRose has worked with numerous acts over the past quarter-century, across an assortment of genres. Performers he has credited for collaborating with include (but not limited to):

- Alice Cooper — Engineer
- Helix — Assistant engineer
- Figgy Duff — Mixing
- Honeymoon Suite — Engineer
- Hanoi Rocks — Engineer, remixing
- Strange Advance — Engineer
- Haywire — Engineer
- Lee Aaron — Engineer, mixing
- The Partland Brothers — Engineer, mixing
- Pukka Orchestra — Mixing
- Strange Advance — Engineer, mixing
- Exchange — Mixing
- The Nylons — Mixing
- Lisa Dal Bello — Engineer, mixing
- Dan Hill — Engineer, mixing
- Liona Boyd — Engineer, mixing
- Acid Test — Producer, engineer, mixing
- John James — Engineer, mixing
- Long John Baldry — Engineer
- Caramel — Mixing, producer, engineer
- Colin Linden — Engineer, mixing
- Prozzäk — Producer, engineer, mixing
- Dunk — Engineer, mixing
- Edwin — Engineer
- The Bourbon Tabernacle Choir — Engineer, recording
- 58 — Engineer
- Ebony Tears — Vocals
- Celine Dion — Engineer
- 54-40 — Mixing
- The Kings — Engineer
- Junkhouse — Producer, mastering
- Fefe Dobson — Mixing
- Mötley Crüe — Engineer
- Max Webster — Engineer
- Melissa O'Neil — Mixing
- Cats Can Fly — Producer
- Dalbello — Production assistance, mixing
- B4-4 — Producer
