= Moxy (album) =

Studio album by Moxy
- Released: 1975 (Canada) 1976 (US)
- Recorded: 1974–1975, Van Nuys, California
- Genres: Hard rock; heavy metal
- Length: 36:25
- Labels: Polydor (Canada); Mercury Records (US)
- Producers: Mark Smith and Moxy

Moxy chronology
Kinfolk (1971)	Moxy (1975)	Moxy II (1976)

Professional ratings
Review scores
Source	Rating
AllMusic	4/5 stars

Moxy, also informally known as The Black Album or Moxy I, is the self-titled debut studio album by the Canadian rock band Moxy. Their independently produced album was released in 1975 by Polydor Records in Canada, then under Mercury Records label was reissued in 1976 for worldwide distribution, both labels were owned by PolyGram at the time (they are now owned by Universal Music Group).

The album was picked up by many radio stations in the United States and was one of the most requested albums in Texas. As a consequence, Moxy was picked up by the larger Mercury Records label in the US and a national distribution deal was made and the album was reissued in 1976. The album produced the hit songs "Can't You See I'm a Star", "Train", "Out of the Darkness" and with "Sail On Sail Away" and "Moon Rider" that are still in the 2000s (decade) on regular rotation on several rock radio stations in Texas. The album sold well because of heavy promotion by the label who released the album on 8 Track in large numbers.

Tommy Bolin was a guest musician on the album. He had previously been the lead guitarist for the James Gang and would go on to replace Ritchie Blackmore in Deep Purple. Bolin does all but two guitar solos. Earl Johnson performed all rhythm guitar and the solos on "Sail On Sail Away", "Can't You See I'm A Star" and the ending of "Train". Johnson was supposed to do all the guitar parts, but got into a disagreement with the producer and was tossed out of the studio. Bolin, being nearby, was asked by Moxy's manager Roland Paquin to fill in for Johnson. Paquin knew Bolin from when he was road manager for the James Gang. Bolin was only in the studio for this album, contrary to popular belief that he appears on Moxy II. Though Bolin's time with Moxy was short, the album is popular with his fans. Bolin's tone and phrasing were very similar to his classic James Gang sound.

Buddy Caine, who is listed on the album cover, did not join the band until after the album was finished. Caine was initially brought on board by the band as a rhythm guitarist to free up Johnson so he could play the solos on stage that Bolin had played in the studio.

== Track listing ==
1. "Fantasy" - 5:40 (Earl Johnson)
2. "Sail On Sail Away" - 4:52 (Earl Johnson)
3. "Can't You See I'm a Star" - 3:36 (Earl Johnson)
4. "Moon Rider (Moonrider)" - 4:25 (Earl Johnson, Buzz Shearman)
5. "Time to Move On" - 4:09 (Earl Johnson, Buzz Shearman)
6. "Still I Wonder" - 4:16 (Earl Johnson)
7. "Train" - 4:37 (Earl Johnson, Robert Bonnell)
8. "Out of the Darkness" - 4:57 (Earl Johnson, Buzz Shearman)

== Singles ==
- 1974 Can’t You See I’m A Star/Out of the Darkness Into The Fire (Yorkville) YVM-45105
- 1975 Sail On, Sail Away (Edit)/Time To Move On (Polydor) 2065-291

== Appearance on compilations ==
- 1989 “Train” and “Time To Move On” on ‘Tommy Bolin: The Ultimate…’ [3LP] (Geffen) GHS-24248

== Personnel ==
- Buzz Shearman - vocals
- Earl Johnson - rhythm and lead guitar (solos on track 2 and 3; joint solos on track 7)
- Terry Juric - bass
- Bill Wade - drums

=== Additional personnel ===
- Tommy Bolin - lead guitar on tracks 1, 4–6 and 8; joint solos on track 7)
- Tom Stephenson - piano on "Fantasy"
- Buddy Caine - rhythm guitar (listed as member but did not join until after record was done)

== Production ==
- Arranged by Moxy
- Produced by Moxy and Mark Smith
- Recorded and mixed by Mark Smith and Richard Dashut at Sound City Studios in Van Nuys
- Jacket sleeve photo by Larry Nickels

Moon Rider (1975)
"Moon Rider" From "Moxy"

Can't You See I'm A Star (1975)
"Can't You See I'm A Star"

Sail on Sail Away (1975)
"Sail on Sail Away"

== Reissued ==
Moxy's original catalogue of albums were again available starting in 1994 when Valerie Shearman (Buzz' widow) oversaw the release of all of Moxy's back catalogue of albums.

- 1975 Moxy (Polydor) 2480-132
- 1995 Moxy [reissue] (Pacemaker) PACE-016
- 2022 Moxy [LP reissue] (Unidisc) AGEK-2241LP
