= Moxy II =

Studio album by Moxy
- Released: 1976
- Recorded: Sound Stage Studios, Toronto, April 1976
- Genres: Hard rock; heavy metal
- Length: 35:40
- Label: Mercury
- Producers: Jack Douglas, Edward Leonetti

Moxy chronology
Moxy (1975)	Moxy II (1976)	Ridin' High (1977)

Professional ratings
Review scores
Source	Rating
Allmusic	3/5 stars

Moxy II is the second studio album by the Canadian rock band Moxy, released in 1976. It was recorded at Sound Stage studio in April 1976 in Toronto with Jack Douglas producing. Two songs from the album entered the charts in Canada, "Take It Or Leave It" that reached number 14 and "Cause There's Another" that reached number 16 on the Top 30 on CHUM (AM) in Toronto, and the KISS-FM Texas hits "Midnight Flight" and "One More Heartbreak". The album sold well because of strong live appearances that included tours with Black Sabbath, Boston and Triumph with heavy promotion by the label (Polydor) (Mercury Records). The album was highly acclaimed on release by Geoff Barton in the UK music publication, Sounds, following which the magazine made the album available to readers for the special price of £1.50.

== Credits ==
- Buzz Shearman - vocals
- Earl Johnson - guitar, slide guitar
- Buddy Caine - guitar, blowbag and acoustic guitar
- Terry Juric - bass guitar
- Bill Wade - drums, percussion
- Mika Sharun - backing vocals
- Steve Byron - backing vocals, assistant
- The Wisconsin Kid - backing vocals
- Edward Leonetti - producer
- Jack Douglas - producer
- Jay Messina - mixing, mixing engineer
- Lee DeCarlo - engineer
- Recorded April 1976 at Sound Stage Studio
- Mixed May 1976 at The Record Plant, New York City

Through The Storm (1976)
"Through The Storm " from 1976 album Moxy II, by Earl Johnson

Cause There's Another (1976)
"Cause There's Another" from 1976 album Moxy II, by Buddy Caine, Buzz Shearman

== Track listing ==
1. "Cause There's Another" - 3:45 (Buddy Caine, Buzz Shearman)
2. "Take it or Leave It" - 3:43 (Buddy Caine, Buzz Shearman)
3. "Through the Storm" - 4:00 (Earl Johnson)
4. "One More Heartbreak" - 2:38(Earl Johnson)
5. "Slippin' Out" - 4:02 (Earl Johnson, Bill Wade, Terry Juric)
6. "Midnight Flight" - 3:30 (Earl Johnson)
7. "Change in My Life" - 4:38 (Buzz Shearman, Buddy Caine)
8. "Tryin' Just for You" - 4:30 (Buzz Shearman, Buddy Caine)
9. "Wet Suit" - 4:54 (Buzz Shearman, Buddy Caine, Terry Juric, Bill Wade, The Wisconsin Kid)

== Singles ==
- 1976 Take It Or Leave It/Wet Suit (Polydor) 2065-318
- 1977 Cause There’s Another (Edit)/Slippin’ Out (Polydor) 2065-340

== Appearance on compilations ==
- 1977 “Take It Or Leave It” on ‘Right On’ (K-Tel) TC-236
- 1977 “Cause There’s Another” on ‘Stars’ (K-Tel) TC-248
- 1999 “Wet Suit” on ‘The Ultimate DEEP PURPLE – Fire, Ice & Dynamite Vol.1’ (Teichitsu Entertainment – SOUTH KOREA) TEP-02112MP
- 2004 “Cause There’s Another” on ‘When CanCon Rocked – Volume 1’ (Bullseye) BLR-CD-4015

== Reissued ==
Moxy's original catalogue of albums was again available starting in 1993 when Valerie Shearman ("Buzz" widow) oversaw the release of all of Moxy's back catalogue of albums.

- 1976 Moxy II (Polydor) 2480-372
- 1995 Moxy II [reissue] (Pacemaker) PACE-017
- 2022 Moxy II [LP reissue] (Unidisc) AGEK-2242LP
