= Lee Aaron =

Canadian rock singer (born 1962)

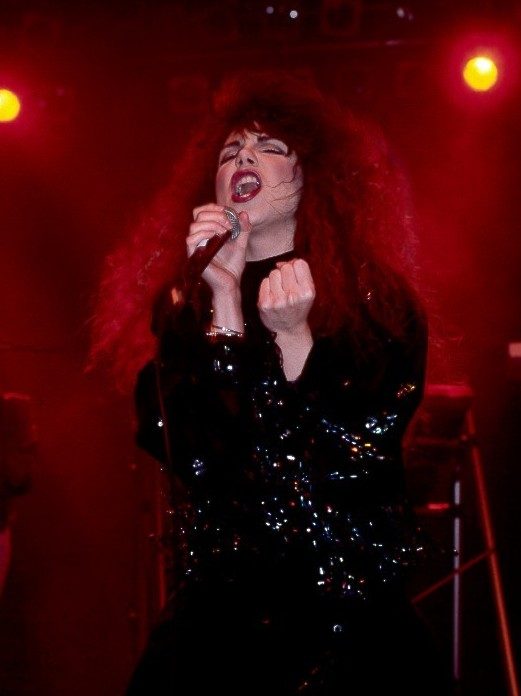
- Aaron performing in Toronto (1987)

Background information
- Also known as: "Metal Queen"
- Born: Karen Lynn Greening; July 21, 1962 (age 64); Belleville, Ontario, Canada
- Genres: Hard rock; jazz; pop; heavy metal
- Occupations: Singer; songwriter
- Instruments: Vocals; guitar
- Years active: 1980–present
- Labels: Attic; Faithful; Freedom Records Inc.
- Website: leeaaron.com

Lee Aaron (born Karen Lynn Greening; July 21, 1962) is a Canadian rock singer. She had several hits in the 1980s and early 1990s, such as "Metal Queen", "Whatcha Do to My Body", and "Sex with Love".

== Early life ==
Aaron was born as Karen Lynn Greening in Belleville, Ontario, and began singing in school musicals at the age of five. She attended high school in Brampton, Ontario.

At age seventeen, Aaron was in a car accident. No surgery was required, but she did suffer a broken nose and badly bruised her face. However, years later Canadian Musician Magazine mistakenly embellished the incident into Aaron requiring complete facial reconstruction. The magazine printed a retraction in the following month's issue.

== Career ==
After singing in a music production when she was fifteen years old, she was asked to join a local rock group, which the members including Karen would name "Lee Aaron". The members placed random names into a hat and drawn by the young musicians. She sang, played alto saxophone and keyboards in this first incarnation of the band, and took on the stage name of Lee Aaron.

=== 1980s ===
Aaron recorded her debut album, The Lee Aaron Project, in 1982 on Freedom Records; it was later reissued on Attic. The album featured well-known musicians of the Toronto music scene, including members of Moxy, Rif Raf3 (Q107 Homegrown Vol 4 / Lee Aaron Project band), Santers, and Triumph's Rik Emmett. Although the album was available in the UK only as an import, Aaron was invited to appear later that year at the Reading Festival.

In late 1982, Aaron flew to New York and posed topless for the men's magazine OUI. The magazine's March 1983 issue featured Aaron on the cover and in an interview. Aaron later concluded that posing for the magazine damaged her musical credibility; she regretted the decision and assigned blame for it to pressure from her manager.

1984's recording of the album Metal Queen resulted in a multi-album deal with Attic Records. During the recording of Metal Queen, guitarist John Albani (ex-Wrabit) joined the band and he and Aaron formed a solid songwriting partnership that lasted eleven years.

Between 1984 and 1992, Aaron toured extensively through Europe and made appearances in Japan and the United States. She released six albums on Attic Records in Canada and international releases in the United Kingdom, Germany, Austria, Switzerland, Benelux, Italy, Scandinavia, Australia and Japan. She won three Toronto Music Awards for Best Female Vocalist and was nominated for Juno awards sixteen times. She amassed zero wins. Her 1985 album Call Of The Wild featured her well-known rock ballad "Barely Holdin On".

Her most commercially successful album was Bodyrock, released in 1989. The album included several hit songs, including "Whatcha Do to My Body", and was certified double platinum in Canada.

=== 1990s ===
In 1992, Aaron left Attic Records to start her label, Hip Chic Music, and released two more albums. On 1994's Emotional Rain (distributed by A & M Canada), Aaron recorded with Don Short and Don Binns (Sons of Freedom), Reeves Gabrels (David Bowie's Tin Machine), and Knox Chandler (the Psychedelic Furs).

1995's 2preciious was a project record written with members of Sons of Freedom, in which she dropped the name "Lee Aaron" entirely and used her real name, Karen. Neither of these recordings was commercially successful, and shortly afterwards, the Sons broke up.

Aaron studied acting for a year before beginning to perform jazz and blues in Toronto with Dennis Ziebart.

=== 2000s ===
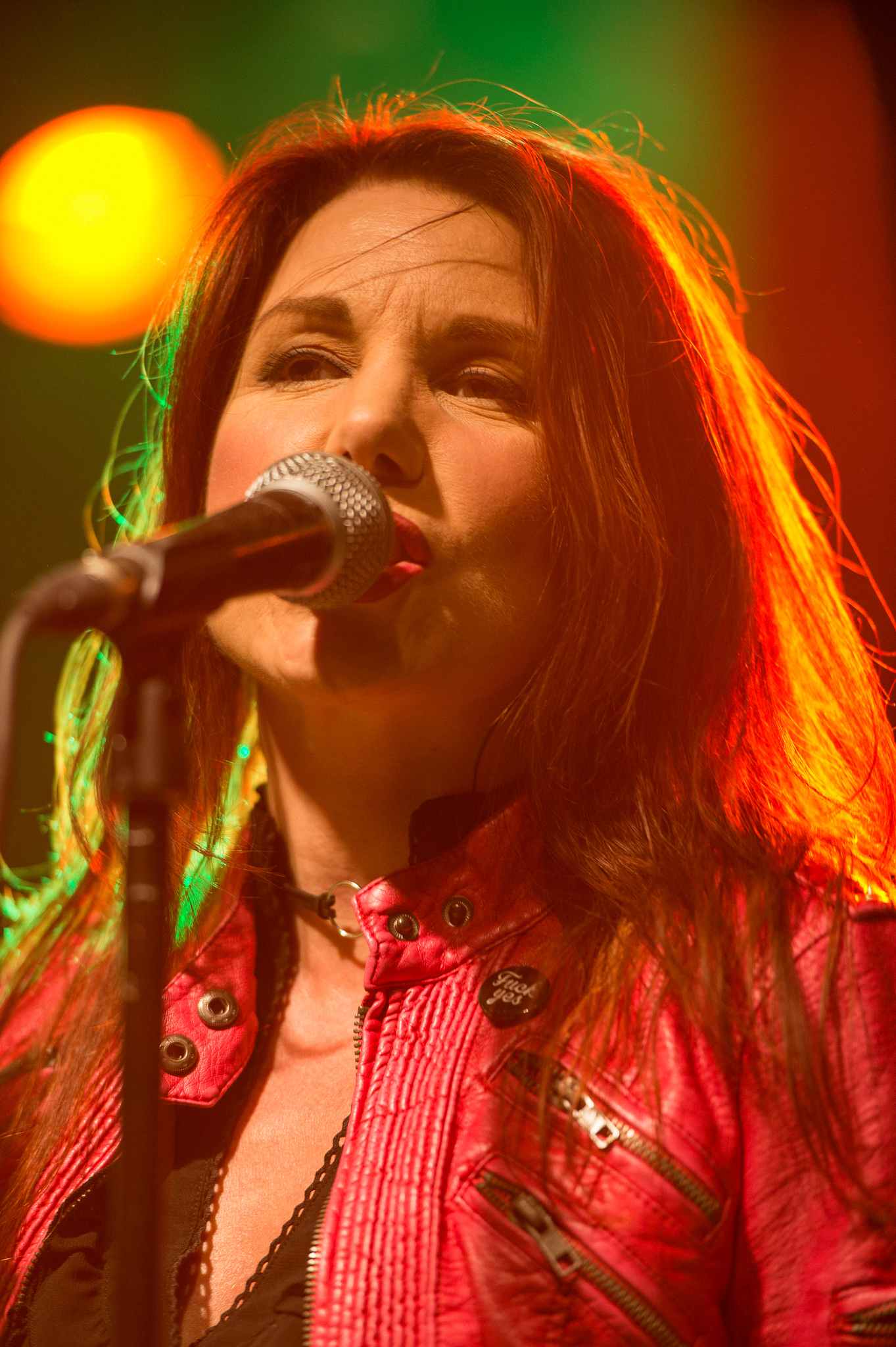
Aaron in 2017

In 2000, Aaron released a jazz album, Slick Chick, on her imprint, Barking Dog Music, with distribution by Fusion 3. She performed extensively in support of this release, showcasing at The Top of the Senator in Toronto and various jazz festivals across Canada and Europe.

In 2002, Aaron was approached to audition with the Modern Baroque Opera Company. She was cast and appeared that year in an ALCAN Performing Arts Award-winning production called 101 Songs for the Marquis De Sade.

Her eleventh album, Beautiful Things, a pop-jazz hybrid, was released in 2004.

Aaron continued to play rock and selected jazz shows; in 2011 she made her first appearance in Sweden at the Sweden Rock Festival.

In March, 2016, Lee Aaron released her first all-rock album in 20 years. Self-financed and released on her own Big Sister Records, the new album was entitled Fire And Gasoline. Later that year she was inducted into the Brampton Arts Walk Of Fame. She then went on to appear at the Rockingham 2016 melodic/hard rock festival in Nottingham, United Kingdom.

In 2017, Lee Aaron played a number of shows in Germany as well as an appearance at Bang Your Head Festivals and two separate gigs in London and Wolverhampton.

== Discography ==
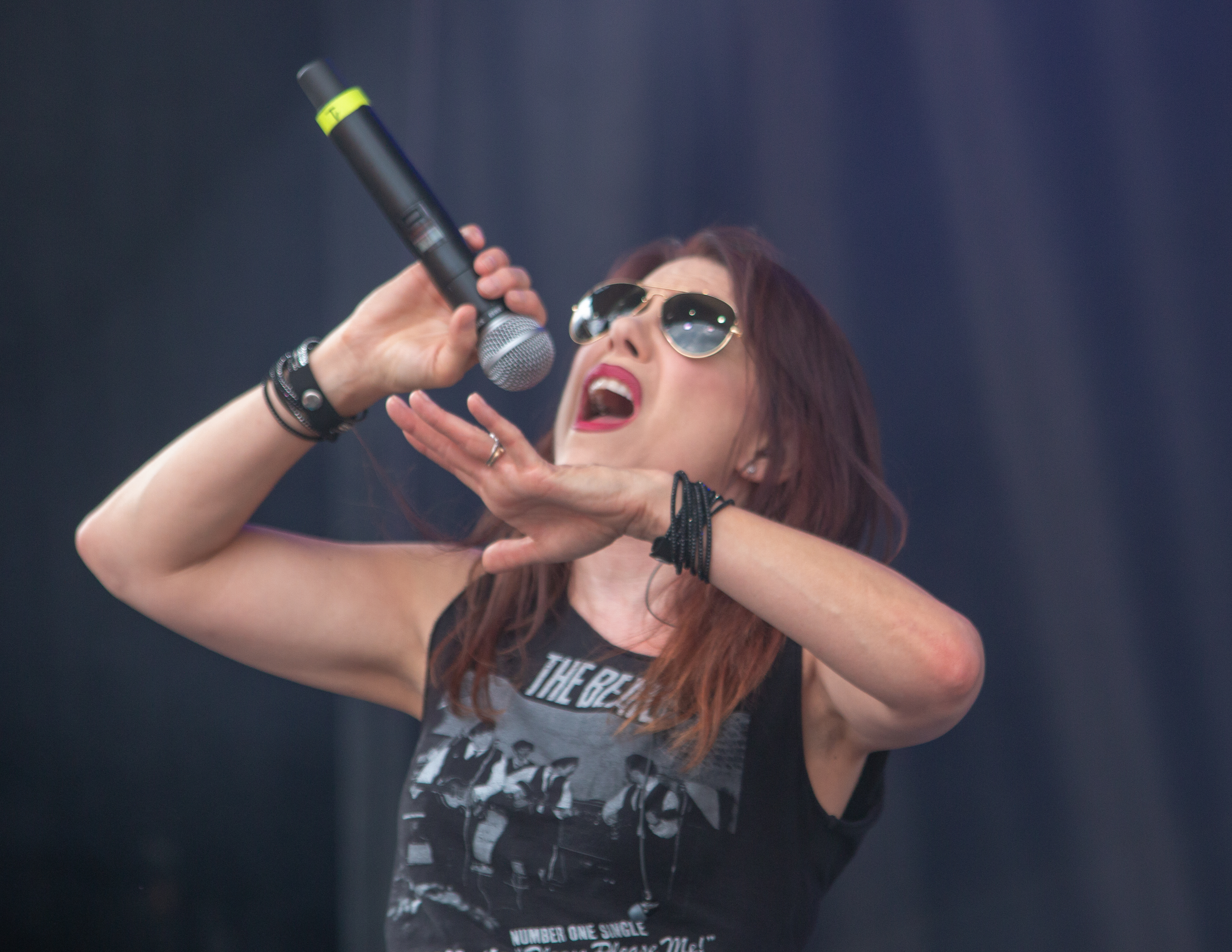
Lee Aaron performing at the Kitchener Blues Festival

=== Albums ===
Year	Album	RPM Top 100	SWE chart	CH chart	DE chart
1982	The Lee Aaron Project	-	-	-	-
1984	Metal Queen	69	-	-	-
1985	Call of the Wild	86	-	-	-
1987	Lee Aaron	39	26	28	51
1989	Bodyrock	32	-	-	36
1991	Some Girls Do	38	-	-	-
1994	Emotional Rain	-	-	-	-
1996	2preciious (with 2preciious)	-	-	-	-
2000	Slick Chick (with the Swingin' Barflies)	-	-	-	-
2004	Beautiful Things	-	-	-	-
2016	Fire and Gasoline	-	-	-	-
2018	Diamond Baby Blues	-	-	-	-
2020	Almost Christmas	-	-	-	-
2021	Radio On!	-	-	-	-
2022	Elevate	-	-	-	-
2024	Tattoo Me	-	-	-	-

=== Compilations ===
- 1992: Powerline: The Best of Lee Aaron, Attic
- 2005: Museum: Videos, Clips and More 1997–2005
- 2008: Rarities, Studio & Live: 1981–2008
- 2012: Live in Sweden (DVD)
- 2012: Radio Hitz and More...

=== Singles ===
Year	Single	Canadian chart position	Album
1982	"Under Your Spell"	-	The Lee Aaron Project
1984	"Metal Queen"	-	Metal Queen
1984	"Shake It Up"	-	Metal Queen
1984	"We Will Be Rockin'"	-	Metal Queen
1985	"Barely Holdin' On"	-	Call of the Wild
1985	"Runnin' from the Fire"	-	Call of the Wild
1985	"Rock Me All Over"	-	Call of the Wild
1987	"Only Human"	44	Lee Aaron
1987	"Dream with Me"	-	Lee Aaron
1987	"Power Line"	-	Lee Aaron
1987	"Goin' Off the Deep End"	93	Lee Aaron
1988	"Do You Know What I Mean" (Myles Goodwyn featuring Lee Aaron)	47	Single only
1989	"Whatcha Do to My Body"	25	Bodyrock
1990	"Hands On"	38	Bodyrock
1990	"Sweet Talk"	-	Bodyrock
1991	"Sex with Love"	55	Some Girls Do
1994	"Odds of Love"	-	Emotional Rain
1995	"Baby Go Round"	-	Emotional Rain
2016	"Tom Boy"	-	Fire and Gasoline
2021	"C'mon"	-	Radio On!
