= Attic Records =

Defunct Canadian record label

- Founded: 1974
- Founder: Alexander Mair; Tom Williams
- Status: Defunct
- Country of origin: Canada
- Location: Toronto, Ontario

Attic Records was a Canadian independent record label, founded in 1974 by Alexander Mair and Tom Williams. The label was known for developing Canadian talent, including Anvil, Lee Aaron, Maestro Fresh Wes, The Nylons, Teenage Head, and Triumph. The company was also active in distributing international acts not affiliated with a major label, most successfully with Jennifer Warnes, "Weird Al" Yankovic, Katrina and the Waves, and Creed.

Attic Records ceased to exist as an independent company in 1999, when it was bought by a consortium headed by Allan Gregg and merged with TMP (The Music Publisher) and Oasis Entertainment Distribution to form The Song Corporation. The Attic label briefly continued to exist as a subsidiary of The Song Corporation, but within months of its acquisition, the label name was changed to "Song Recordings".

The Song Corporation filed for bankruptcy in May 2001. Attic's Canadian catalog and masters are now owned by Unidisc Music.

== Artists ==
- Aaron Carter
- Adrian Zmed
- Anvil
- Lee Aaron
- Blind Vengeance
- Body Electric
- The Bop Cats
- Rob McConnell & The Boss Brass
- Coal Chamber
- Sara Craig
- Creed (Canada only, 1997–99)
- Downchild Blues Band
- Shirley Eikhard
- Fludd
- The Frantics
- Fun Factory
- Patsy Gallant
- Goblin
- Goddo
- Hagood Hardy
- Haywire
- House of Pain
- The Irish Rovers
- Jazmin
- Jennifer Warnes
- Jerry Cantrell
- Michaele Jordana
- Junkie XL
- Judas Priest
- Kamahl
- Katrina and the Waves
- Ken Tobias
- Killer Dwarfs
- Klaatu
- Life of Agony
- The Lincolns founded by Prakash John
- Lio
- M-Appeal
- Machine Head
- MacLean & MacLean
- Maestro Fresh Wes
- Motörhead
- Dutch Mason
- Belinda Metz
- Digital Underground
- Elton Motello
- The Nylons
- The Orb
- The Bopcats
- Plastic Bertrand
- Queen of the Stones Age
- Raggadeath
- Razor
- Rita Coolidge
- Ron Nigrini
- Annie Ryan
- Secret Service
- Sepultura
- Skee-lo
- Slipknot
- The Soft Boys
- Soulfly
- Teenage Head
- George Thorogood
- Ken Tobias
- Toyah
- Triumph
- Type O Negative
- Wayne County & the Electric Chairs
- Warriors
- Jesse Winchester
- Rick Worrall
- "Weird Al" Yankovic

== See also ==
- List of record labels
