= Female performers in hard rock music =

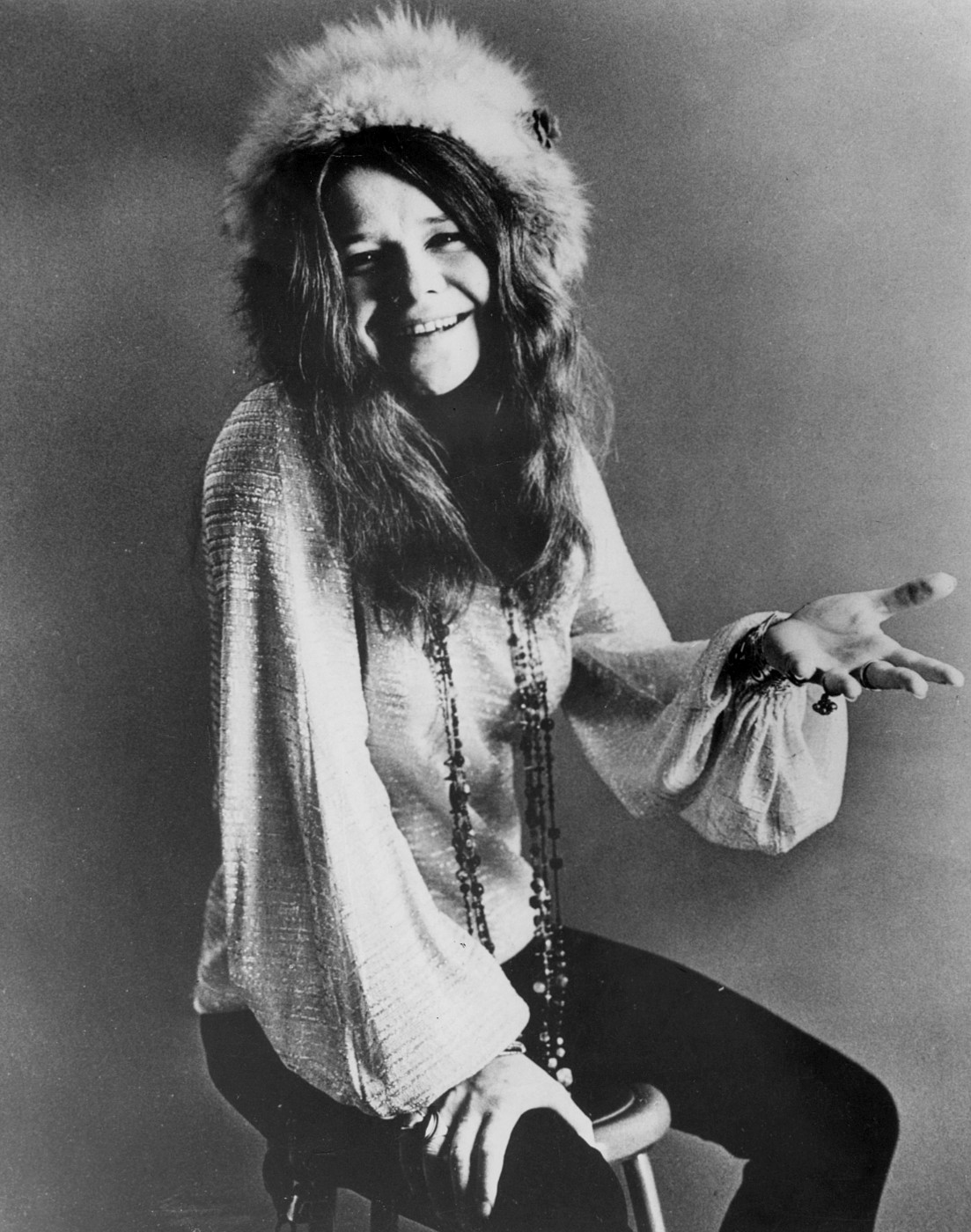
American singer-songwriter Janis Joplin, photographed here in 1969, redefined how female vocalists looked and sounded as well as what sorts of songs that they sing.

The relationships between female performers in hard rock music versus amateur and professional critics as well as the general public and specific groups of fans who listen to those songs have been a topic of intellectual analysis over multiple decades. Analyzing the initial development of hard rock related styles and the spread in popular culture of rock music in general, the American news agency KQED has reported that for "women musicians... there really was only a sliver of attention— and money, and festival slots, and airtime— to go around." Sexism in the context of the music industry has also been criticized in the pages of the American entertainment magazine Billboard.

Publications such as the online news service Consequence have described cultural changes after the end of the 20th century and onwards with respect to women in hard rock music, with a June 2002 piece on musician Lzzy Hale of the band Halestorm detailing her account of the "night and day" evolution to the extent that trends have "completely flipped." She remarked in depth, "It used to be that not only was I the only girl in a band onstage but I was the only girl on tour, and now that’s not the case... [since] I’m not alone in being a girl musician... [while] also there are female lighting techs and tour managers and engineers and roadies." She noted the diversity inside audiences that additionally served to prove "once and for all, even though we’ve been talking about it for eons, that this hard rock genre is genderless."

== Background and commentary ==
Women singing hard rock music have been their careers commented upon by amateur and professional critics over multiple decades. A notable article by American media figure Jacoba Atlas in November 1971, which appeared in the pages of the U.S. entertainment magazine Billboard, used the explicit title "There Aren't Many Girls In Hard Rock, But A New Day (And Attitude) Is Dawning". Atlas argued that popular stereotypes and other expressions of prejudice in American society focusing on gender identity warped musical production, with her remarking that this intellectual framework meant that hard rock's presentation as "raw, aggressive, driving, [and] electric" became forcibly divorced from "our culture's assessment of the essence of femininity". Atlas additionally opinioned that "the traditional role of the woman", which includes "sexist" expectations about how women cannot "scream and sweat" or otherwise do certain things, "have conspired to keep women... from coming to the forefront" of hard rock (or rock music generally). Although writing for a major commercial publication, Atlas criticized the music industry of the time.

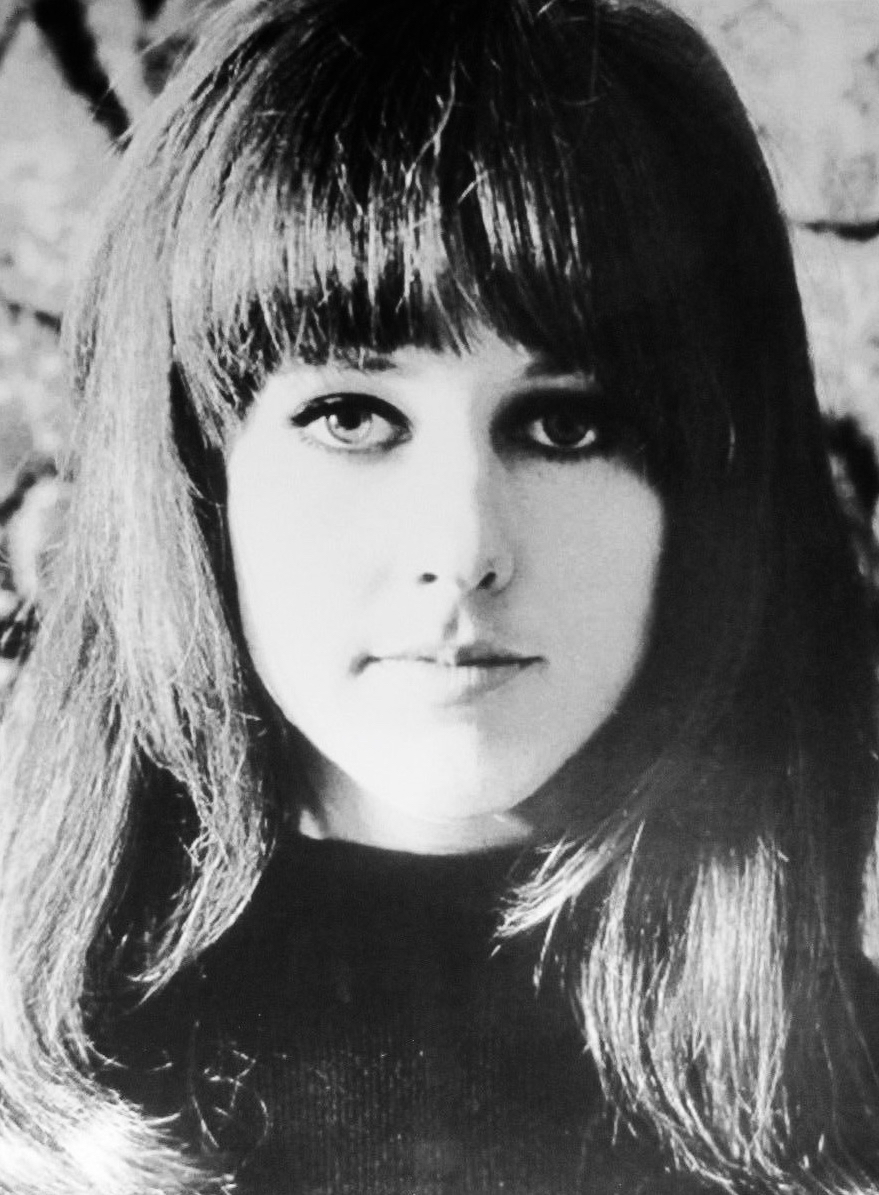
Performer Grace Slick has gained popularity for her public image as an "outlaw" inside of the American music industry.

Prominent examples of female hard rock vocalists include Janis Joplin, regarded as one of the most iconic women in heavy music whose "tragic" death early in life "left a void", as well as Grace Slick, known for rising to fame as a member of the band Jefferson Airplane. Slick has been described as like a rebellious "goddess" given how even after attaining commercial success she "has always lived as an outlaw." In addition, the musical group Fanny has been labeled "the first successful all-girl rock band".

The band Joy of Cooking featured female vocalists Toni Brown and Terry Garthwaite, and they have also been highlighted as "well-known hard rock singers." As recounted by the American news agency KQED, "Garthwaite can’t remember every inane comment she’s received from a man who seemed threatened or confused by her." Discussing past instances of misogyny, Garthwaite later noted a time around 1970 when she had gone into a business to buy guitar strings and encountered a man who told her: "If I close my eyes and forget that there are women in the band, [then] it sounds really good". The guitarist, singer, and songwriter opined that said social culture "was, in a nutshell, the [common] perspective" and that she'd additionally faced the "[s]ame thing with the... record companies." Analyzing the initial development of hard rock related styles and the spread in popular culture of rock music in general, KQED has reported that for "women musicians... there really was only a sliver of attention— and money, and festival slots, and airtime— to go around."

Publications such as the online news service Consequence have described cultural changes after the end of the 20th century and onwards with respect to women in hard rock music, with a June 2002 piece on musician Lzzy Hale of the band Halestorm detailing her account of the "night and day" evolution to the extent that trends have "completely flipped." She remarked in depth, "It used to be that not only was I the only girl in a band onstage but I was the only girl on tour, and now that's not the case... [since] I’m not alone in being a girl musician... [while] also there are female lighting techs and tour managers and engineers and roadies." She noted the diversity inside audiences that additionally served to prove "once and for all, even though we’ve been talking about it for eons, that this hard rock genre is genderless." In contrast, she recounted that she at times "was the only girl on tour" back in the days right after Halestorm's release of the band's self-titled debut during the year 2009, with this advancement being "wonderful to see."

== See also ==
- History of hard rock music
- List of female rock singers
- List of hard rock musicians (A–M)
- List of hard rock musicians (N–Z)
- Music journalism
- Prejudice
  - Conformity
  - Elitism
  - Gender inequality
  - Gender policing
  - Gender stereotypes
  - Misogyny
  - Objectification
  - Sexism
