= Women in rock =

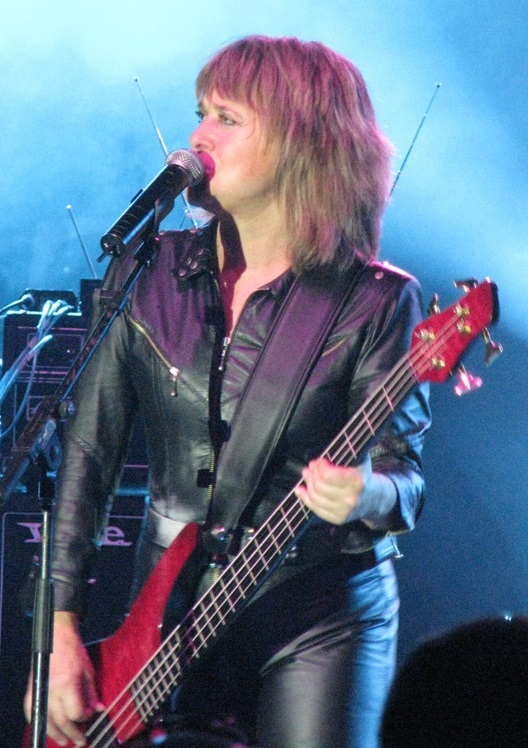
Suzi Quatro is a singer, bassist and bandleader. When she launched her career in 1973, she was one of the few prominent women instrumentalists and bandleaders.

Women in rock describes the role of women singers, instrumentalists, record producers and other music professionals in rock, popular music and the many subgenres and hybrid genres that have emerged each decade. Women have had a high prominence in many popular music styles as singers, helping shape modern music and embracing more authenticity in their sound. However, professional women instrumentalists are uncommon in popular music, especially in rock genres such as heavy metal. "[P]laying in a band is largely a male homosocial activity, that is, learning to play in a band is largely a peer-based... experience, shaped by existing sex-segregated friendship networks". As well, rock music "...is often defined as a form of male rebellion vis-à-vis female bedroom culture."

== Overview ==
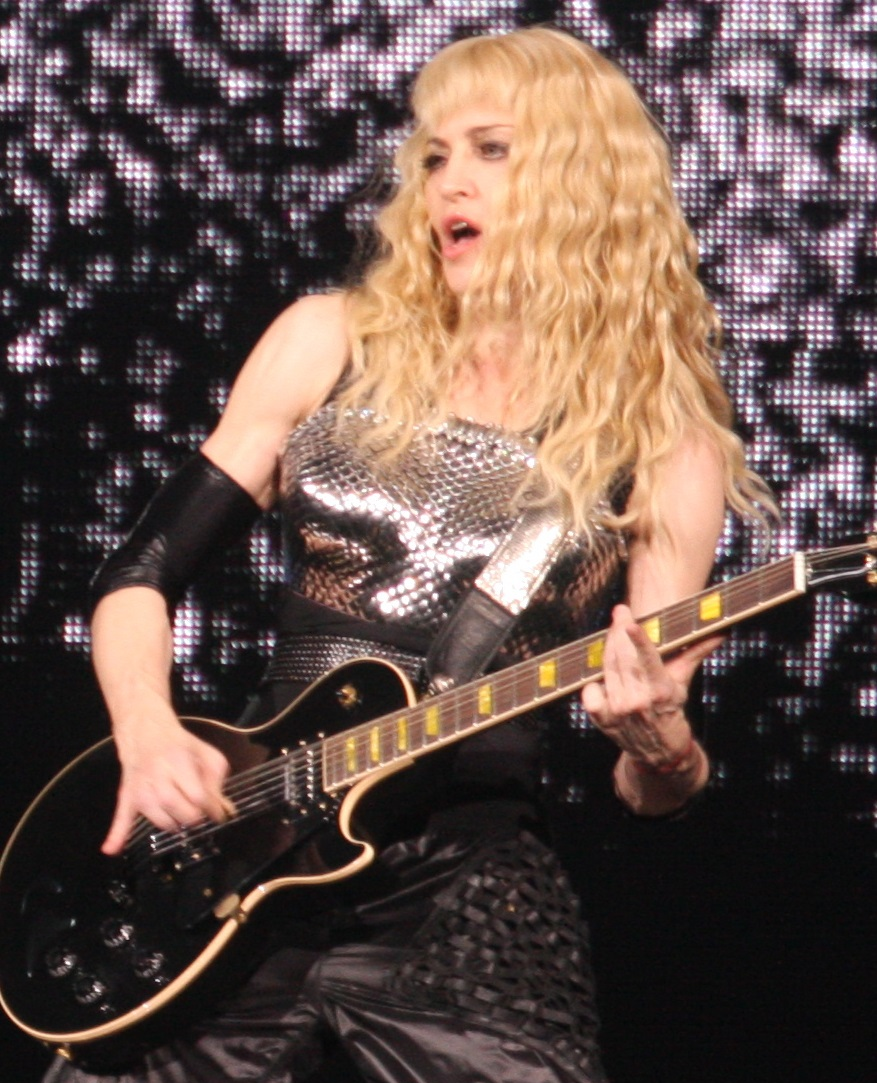
According to the Rock Hall, Madonna became an early emblem of "'women in rock' helping dissolve gender boundaries in the music business.

In popular music, there has been a gendered "distinction between public (male) and private (female) participation" in music. "[S]everal scholars have argued that men exclude women from bands or from the bands' rehearsals, recordings, performances and other social activities." "Women are mainly regarded as passive and private consumers of allegedly slick, prefabricated – hence, inferior – pop music..., excluding them from participating as high status rock musicians." One of the reasons that there are rarely mixed-gender bands is that "bands operate as tight-knit units in which homosocial solidarity – social bonds between people of the same sex... – plays a crucial role." In the 1960s pop music scene, "[s]inging was sometimes an acceptable pastime for a girl, but playing an instrument...simply wasn't done."

Women in the 1950s and 60s era were mostly singers, sometimes instrumentalists, and were a more minor part in developing rock scene compared to men. Rock music was "largely a male rebellion" while young women sang in songs depicting their reliance on their boyfriend. Philip Auslander, an American author and performance studies and popular musicology expert, said that, "Although there were many women in rock by the late 1960s, most performed only as singers, a traditionally feminine position in popular music." Though some women played instruments in American all-female garage rock bands, none of these bands achieved more than regional success. So they "did not provide viable templates for women's on-going participation in rock."

From the 1970s and 80s, women solo musicians and bands altered the status quo of male dominance in rock. When Suzi Quatro emerged in 1973, "no other prominent female musician worked in rock simultaneously as a singer, instrumentalist, songwriter, and bandleader." According to Auslander, she was "kicking down the male door in rock and roll and proving that a female musician ... and this is a point I am extremely concerned about ... could play as well if not better than the boys." In relation to the gender composition of heavy metal bands, it has been said that "[h]eavy metal performers are almost exclusively male", "...[a]t least until the mid-1980s", apart from "...exceptions such as Girlschool." However, "...now [in the 2010s] maybe more than ever–strong metal women have put up their dukes and got down to it", "carv[ing] out a considerable place for [them]selves." In the 2020s, alongside maintaining relevance in the industry, women face a "motherhood penalty" as the still male-dominated music industry is not always conducive to traditional parenting with some artists bringing their children on tour.

A number of these artists are also notable for singing and songwriting, but they are listed here for their instrumental skills:

- Joni Mitchell
- Bonnie Raitt
- Nancy Wilson (of Heart)
- Kaki King
- Orianthi
- Sister Rosetta Tharpe
- Jennifer Batten
- Mary Ford
- Lita Ford
- Joan Jett
- Janet Gardner (of Vixen)
- Kim Deal
- Kim McAuliffe (of Girlschool)
- Carla Olson (of the Textones. also a guitar player, songwriter and producer)
- Deborah Harry (of Blondie)
- Lizzy Hale (of Halestorm)
- Dolores O'Riordan (of The Cranberries)
- Rita Lee (of Os Mutantes)

== All-female bands and girl groups ==
An all-female band is a musical group in popular music genres such as rock, blues, jazz and related genres which is exclusively composed of female musicians. This is distinct from a girl group, in which the female members are solely vocalists, though this terminology is not universally followed. In some online publications, vocalist group Girls Aloud are referred to as a "girl band" while instrumentalists Girlschool are termed a "girl group". While all-male bands are common in many rock and pop bands, all-female bands are less common.

A girl group is a music act featuring several female singers who generally harmonize their vocals together. The term "girl group" is also used in a narrower sense within English-speaking countries to denote the wave of American female pop music singing groups which flourished in the late 1950s and early 1960s between the decline of early rock and roll and the British Invasion, many of whom were influenced by doo-wop. All-female bands are sometimes also called girl groups.

=== 1930s–1960s ===
In the jazz age and during the 1930s, all-female bands such as the Blue Belles, the Parisian Redheads (later the Bricktops), Lil-Hardin's All-Girl Band, the Ingenues, the Harlem Playgirls, Phil Spitalny's Musical Sweethearts and "Helen Lewis and Her All-Girl Jazz Syncopators" were popular. Ina Ray Hutton led an all-girl band, the Melodears, from 1934 to 1939. Eunice Westmoreland, under the name Rita Rio, led an all-female band, appearing on NBC Radio and for Vitaphone and RKO. Ivy Benson's "All Girls Band" was the BBC's resident dance band in 1943 and toured until the 1980s. A Polish group, Filipinki, was established in 1959.

Groups composed solely of women began to emerge with the advent of rock and roll. Among the earliest all-female rock bands to be signed to a record label were Goldie & the Gingerbreads, to Atlantic Records in 1964, the Pleasure Seekers with Suzi Quatro to Hideout Records in 1964 and Mercury Records in 1968. There was also a band formed in 1964 with four girls from Indonesia, Dara Puspita. The Feminine Complex signed to Athena Records in 1968, and Fanny (who pioneered the all-female band sound in the early to mid-1970s) was signed to Warner Bros. Records by Mo Ostin in 1969. There were others, such as the Liverbirds (1962–1967), the Ace of Cups (1967), the Heart Beats (1968) and Ariel (1968–1970).

=== 1970s–1980s ===
In 1971, Fanny became the first all-female band to reach the Hot 100's Top 40, with "Charity Ball" peaking at No. 40. Fanny dealt with societal expectations conflicting with their music as women in bands were regarded in disbelief and labels rejected them fearing they would quit to raise children. Shortly after leaving Os Mutantes, Rita Lee formed the folk rock duo Cilibrinas do Éden with guitarist Lúcia Turnbull in 1973. They performed only once at the Phono 73 festival before disbanding. In 1975, the Canadian duo of sisters Kate and Anna McGarrigle recorded the first of a string of albums. The Runaways were an early commercially successful, hard-edged, all-female hard rock band, releasing their first album in 1976: band members Joan Jett, Cherie Currie and Lita Ford all went on to solo careers. The 1980s, for the first time, saw long-sought chart success from all-female bands and female-fronted rock bands. On the Billboard Hot 100-year-end chart for 1982, Joan Jett's "I Love Rock 'n' Roll" at No. 3 and the Go-Go's "We Got the Beat" at No. 25 sent a message out to many industry heads that females who could play could bring in money.

==== Punk ====
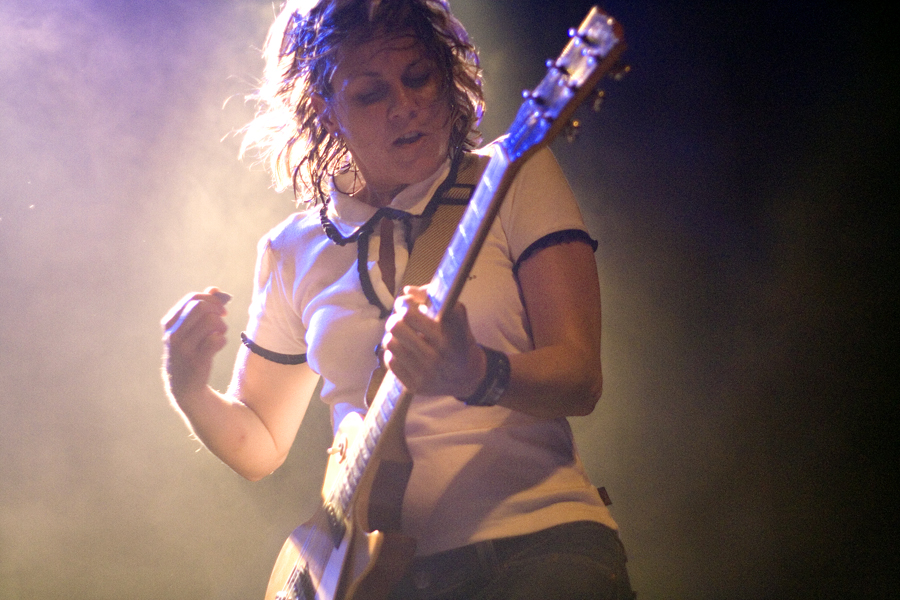
Magnapop's Ruthie Morris combines fast and aggressive punk rock guitar playing with Linda Hopper's pop-influenced vocals.

In the United Kingdom, the advent of punk in the late 1970s with its "anyone can do it" ethos led to women making significant contributions. In contrast to the rock music and heavy metal scenes of the 1970s, which were dominated by men, the anarchic, counter-cultural mindset of the punk scene in mid-to-late 1970s encouraged women to participate. "That was the beauty of the punk thing," Chrissie Hynde later said. "[Sexual] discrimination didn't exist in that scene." This participation played a role in the historical development of punk music, especially in the U.S. and U.K. at that time, and continues to influence and enable future generations.

Rock historian Helen Reddington states that the popular image of young punk women musicians as focused on the fashion aspects of the scene (fishnet stockings, spiky blond hair, etc.) was stereotypical. She states that many, if not most, women punks were more interested in the ideology and socio-political implications, rather than the fashion. Music historian Caroline Coon contends that before punk, women in rock music were virtually invisible; in contrast, in punk, she argues "[i]t would be possible to write the whole history of punk music without mentioning any male bands at all – and I think a lot of [people] would find that very surprising." Johnny Rotten wrote that, "During the Pistols era, women were out there playing with the men, taking us on in equal terms ... It wasn't combative, but compatible." Women were involved in bands such as the Slits, the Raincoats, Mo-dettes, Dolly Mixture and the Innocents.

Others take issue with the notion of equal recognition, such as guitarist Viv Albertine, who stated that "the A&R men, the bouncers, the sound mixers, no one took us seriously.. So, no, we got no respect anywhere we went. People just didn't want us around." The anti-establishment stance of punk opened the space for women who were treated like outsiders in a male-dominated industry. Sonic Youth's Kim Gordon states, "I think women are natural anarchists, because you're always operating in a male framework."

==== Heavy metal ====
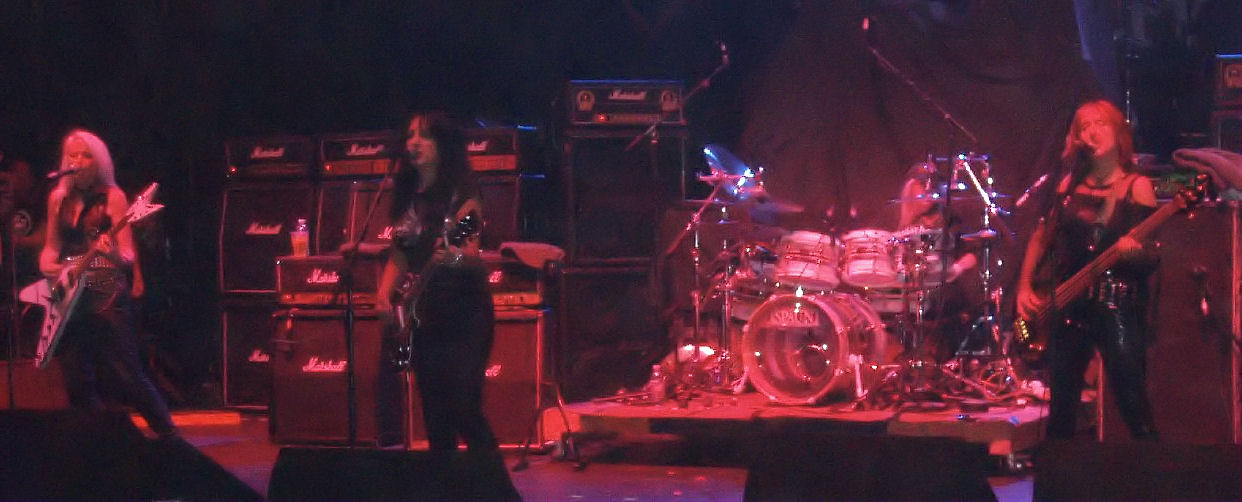
Girlschool is a British all-women heavy metal band formed in the new wave of British heavy metal scene in 1978 and frequently associated with contemporaries Motörhead. They are the longest running all-female rock band, still active after more than 35 years.

The all-female heavy metal band Girlschool, from South London, formed in 1978. While somewhat successful in the UK, they became better known in the early 1980s. One of the original members of the band, Kathy Valentine departed to join the all-female band The Go-Go's, switching from guitar to bass. Among Girlschool's early recordings was an EP titled "The St. Valentines Day Massacre" which they recorded with Bronze label-mates Motörhead under the name Headgirl. In 1974, The Deadly Nightshade, a rock/country band, was signed by Phantom.

=== 1990s–2000s ===
In the 1990s, musician's magazines were starting to view female musicians more seriously, putting Bonnie Raitt and Tina Weymouth on its covers. While The Go-Go's and The Bangles, both from the LA club scene, were the first all-female rock bands to find sustained success, individual musicians paved the way for the industry to seek out bands that had female musicians.

In the 1990s, bands such as Hole, Babes in Toyland, Super Heroines, The Lovedolls and L7 became popular, while demonstrating on stage, and in interviews, a self-confident and "bad" attitude at times, always willing to challenge assumptions about how an all-female band should behave. Courtney Love described the other women in Hole as using a more "lunar viewpoint" in their roles as musicians. In the 1990s, the punk, female-led riot grrrl genre was associated with bands such as Bratmobile and Bikini Kill. Riot grrrl defines the underground, punk feminist movement that stood for uplifting female voices.

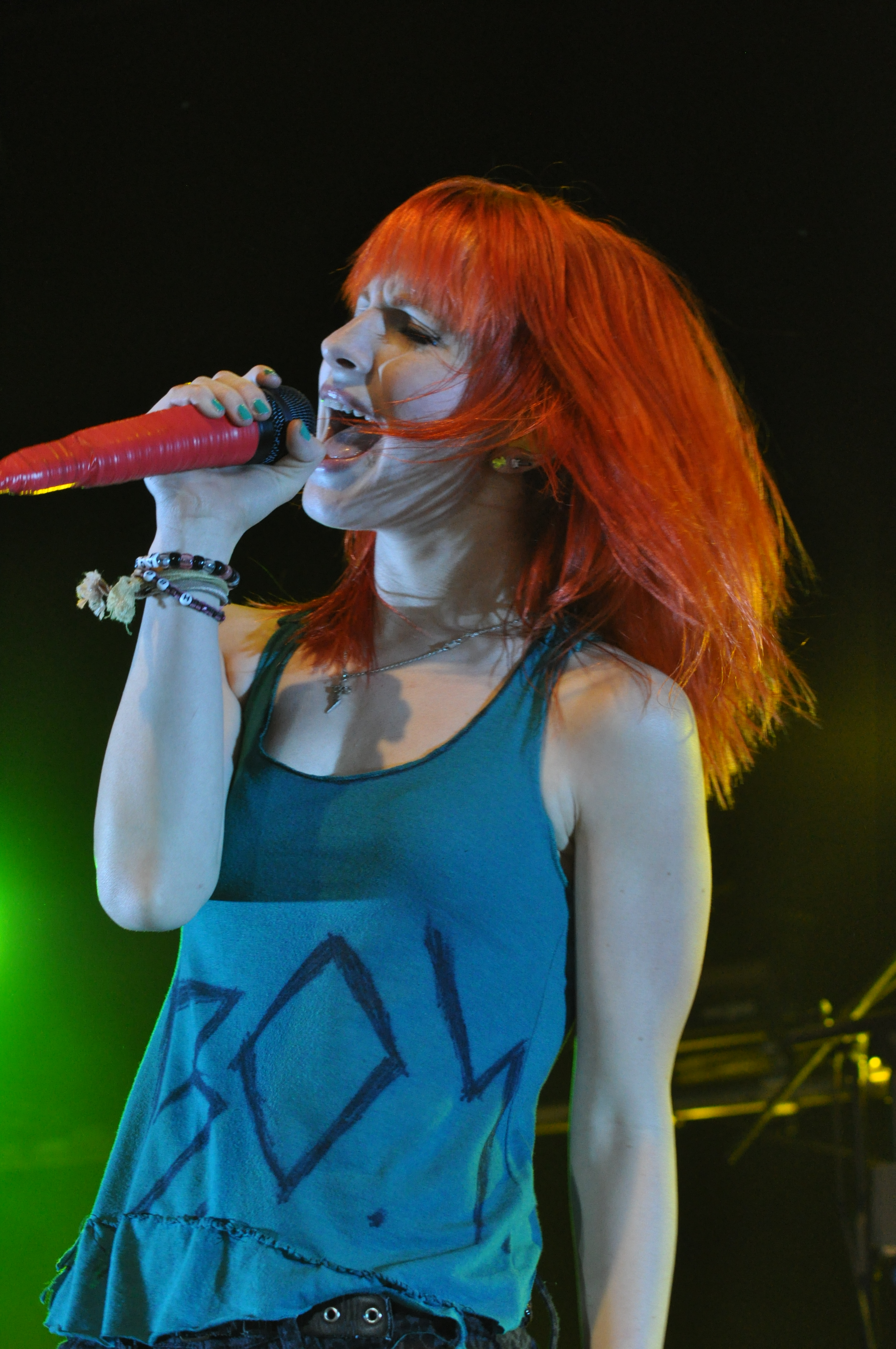
Hayley Williams has been the lead vocalist of Paramore since 2004, when they first started to play small shows in Franklin, Tennessee.

In the early 2000s, Paramore had continual chart success and were a new, up-and-coming female-led band with vocalist Hayley Williams. The band gained initial traction for being a "Christian group" but later evolved from that genre.

When Paramore's third album "Brand New Eyes" released in 2009, it was nominated for a Grammy and was included on the "Twilight" movie soundtrack. This paved the way and helped them become more of a household name. One of Paramore's largest releases, their self-titled record that released in 2013, brought in No. 1 Billboard singles like "Ain't It Fun." which also won a Grammy.

Now at a trio, Williams, Zac and York released their most recent record "This Is Why," their sixth studio album, in 2023. "This Is Why" debuted at No. 2 on the Billboard 200 after its release.

Williams has been outspoken about her experience as a woman in the music industry and called out the negative treatment she faced just because of her gender. In an interview with NME, she said, "I still have that sense of competitiveness from where we first started. But if that was the only thing in the tank, I wouldn't care to do this anymore," she said. "Especially as a woman, I want people to see s--- we're doing and feel seen or welcome or the permission to do the same thing. It's a huge f---ing gift that that's the purpose I could serve."

=== 2010s ===
The resurgence of indie rock skyrocketed in the 2010s with many female-led bands that have proven to be popular to this day. Wolf Alice, composed of vocalist Ellie Rowsell, guitarist Joff Oddie, bassist Theo Ellis, and drummer Joel Amey formed in 2010. They started as an acoustic duo, just Roswell and Oddie but later developed into a band.

With their alternative rock and dream pop sounds, Wolf Alice's sound has been described as "feral and sophisticated" in a review from The Daily Telegraph.

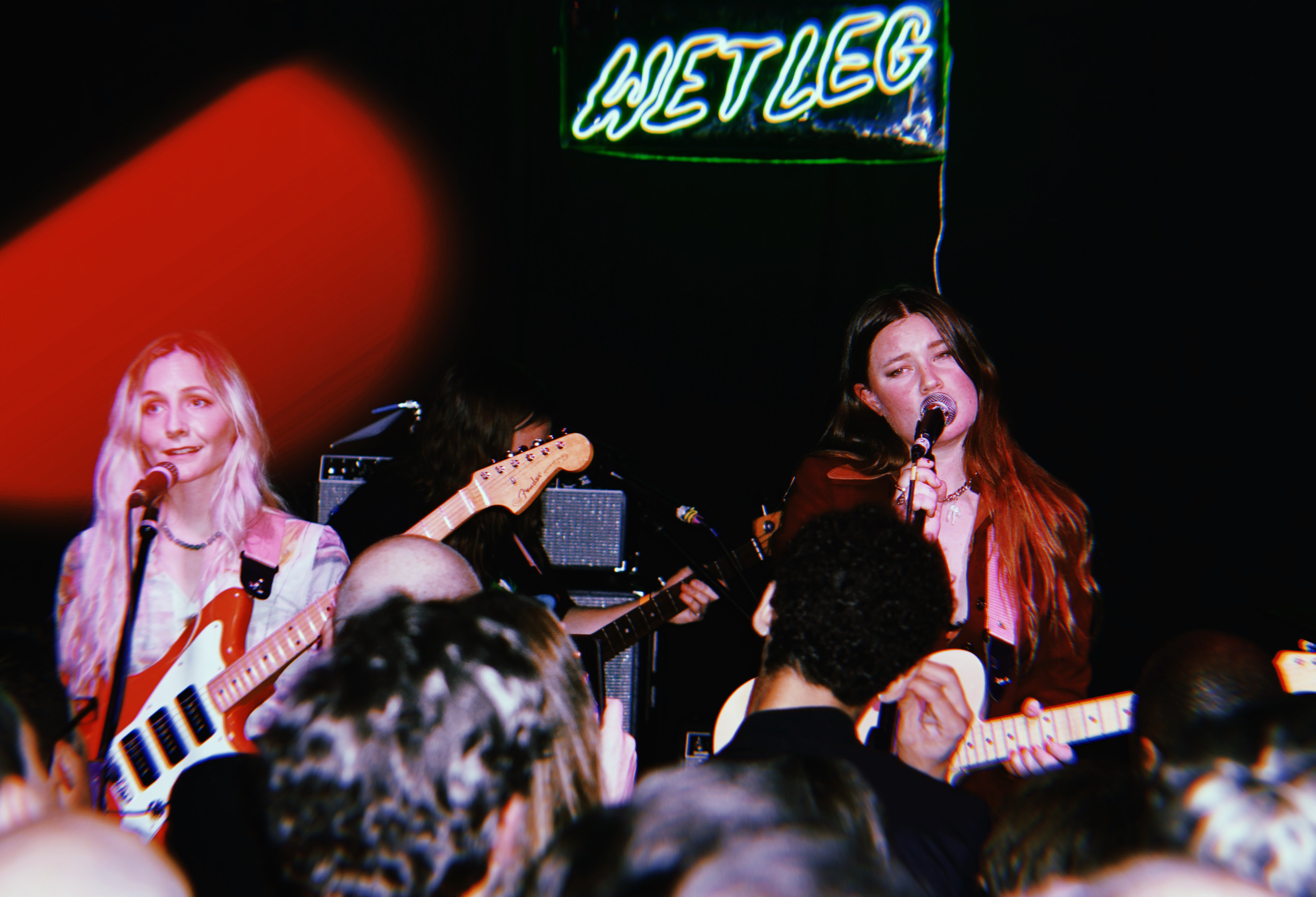
Rhian Teasdale and Hester Chambers of Wet Leg, a female duo rock group that rose to popularity after their song "Chaise Longue" in 2021

Wet Leg came about in 2019 and created a sound that was fresh and unheard of before. Wet Leg is a rock band that consists of two women, Rhian Teasdale and Hester Chambers. Their name was randomly chosen from a combination of randomly choosing some emoji's on their keyboard and finding the water and leg emoji. The band's name is also an old Isle of Wight term for non-locals that would visit.

Throughout their journey as a band, both Teasdale and Chambers have been outspoken about their exploration of femininity throughout their tracks. In an interview on the Face-to-Face podcast, Teasdale said, "I think for us one of the hardest or most irritating things about being women is probably just the stupid comments on the internet like, 'Oh she's holding that guitar but she's not actually playing it.'" She shared, "Like, for example, when I am not using my guitar but then I need to play it in the chorus or something, there will always be a comment being like, 'Girls shouldn't play guitar, women shouldn't play guitar,' and it's just like... it's so dated but it's still there! And I just hate it so much. It's so frustrating."

Going into the later 2010s, musicians like HAIM, Wolf Alice, St. Vincent and Florence & The Machine created new sounds in rock that influenced more of an indie-pop, avant-garde style with catchy lyrics and tunes.

Florence and the Machine's vocalist, Florence Welch, recalled her early experiences with criticism about her artistry and fame contributing to "a 15-year outpouring of frustration" in the 2025 single "One of the Greats"

=== 2020s ===
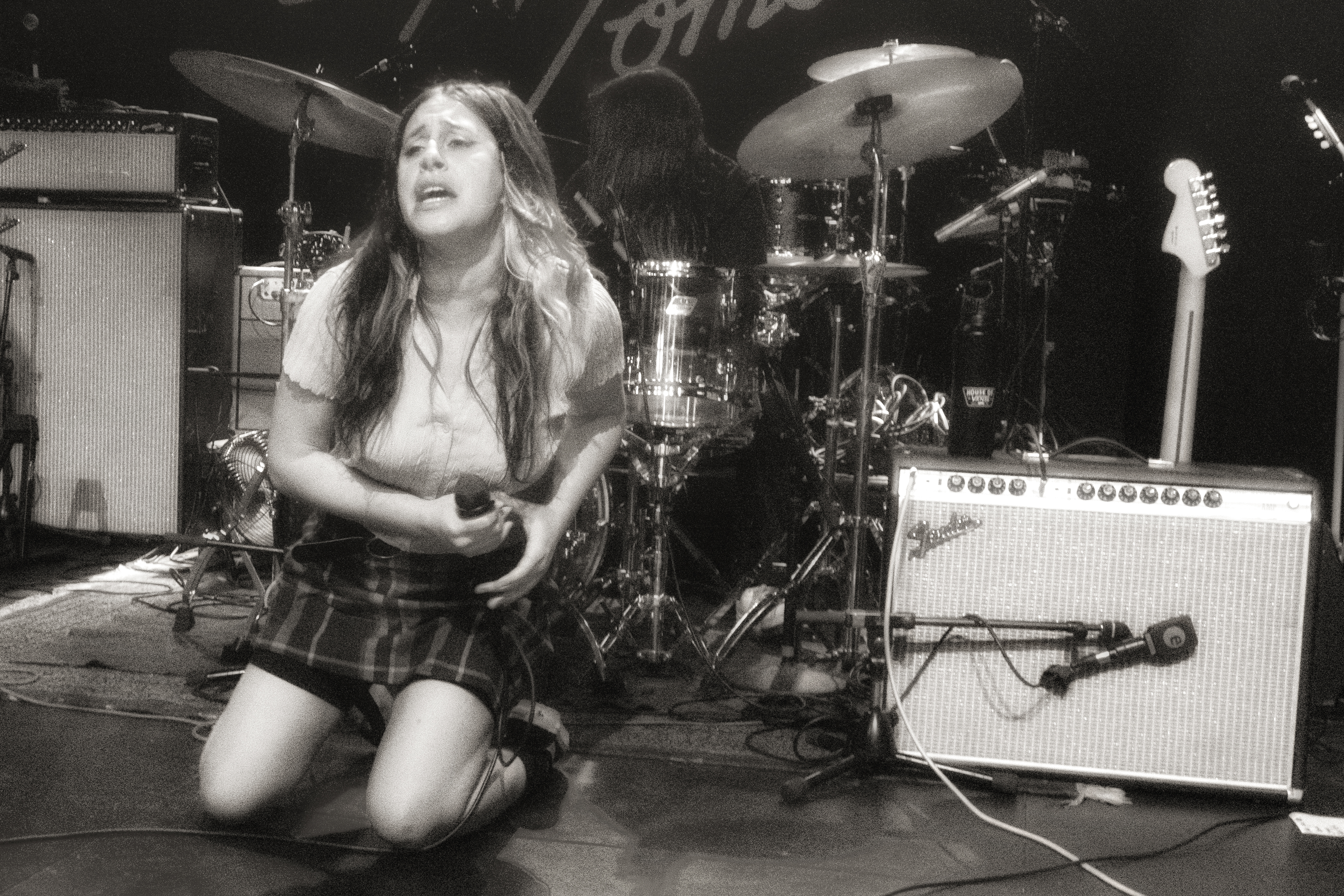
Marisa Dabice is a musician and director of Philadelphia-based band Mannequin Pussy.

In the 2020s, rock has been redefined by cultural movements. Rock music has always been defined with a counterculture, a rebellion and going against what is seen as a norm. As the genre continues to expand, female-led rock groups like Mannequin Pussy, who have been around since 2010, gain newfound fame from their feral, unhinged, rage-filled sound. In an interview with Dork Magazine, Mannequin Pussy's lead singer Marisa (Missy) Dabice said, "They tell you that you get less angry as you get older, but I've actually found the opposite to be true: my rage has only deepened, but I've got much better at coexisting with it."

In a more ravenous approach, other female artists like Olivia Rodrigo have taken a more spunky, grungey energy that blends the lines of pop and rock. Her songs like "Good 4 U" and "Brutal" from her hit-record "Sour" aim to expand rock into something that isn't just heavy metal, but can be whatever the artist wants to make it.

== See also ==
- Female performers in hard rock music
- Women in music
- Queen of Rock
- Rock Against Sexism
