= Alfred Lagarde =

Dutch disc jockey

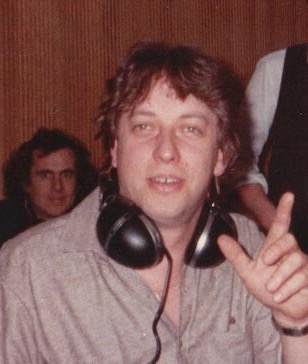
- Born: Alfred van Garde; 2 April 1948; Groningen, Netherlands
- Died: 1 January 1998 (aged 49)

Alfred Lagarde (2 April 1948 – 1 January 1998) was a Dutch disc jockey.

== Biography ==
Born in Groningen, Lagarde presented the hard rock radio program Betonuur from 1974 to 1979. Lagarde was a great proponent of hard rock and heavy metal; he also produced the first single of Dutch-language hard rock act Vandale, in 1979.

Lagarde performed the original voice of Telly on Sesamstraat, the Dutch co-production of Sesame Street. After a few brief appearances, Telly became a main character in the late 1980s. His Dutch name is Teevee Monster, or simply Teevee ("tay-vay"). When Lagarde died, Fred Meijer became the new dubbing voice of Telly.

Alfred Lagarde became friends with the band members of Toto. Due to his efforts, Toto recorded their first live album in 1992 in Den Bosch, Netherlands. The recordings were released in 1993 on Absolutely Live. Alfred is acknowledged as co-producer of the album.
