= Vandale (band) =

Dutch band

Vandale was a Dutch hard rock and heavy metal band. Founded in 1979, they were unique for using the Dutch language in their lyrics, unlike most other Dutch rock bands of the time. They released two albums in the early 1980s, but a third album was never put on sale, and their label dropped the band in 1984 for lack of commercial success. They came back together in the early 2000s, releasing a single in 2008 and an album in 2017. In 2020, after personnel changes, the band changed its name to Moondawgs and started singing in English.

== History ==
=== 1979-1984: Foundation and demise ===
The band was founded in Sittard in 1979 (as "Pharao"), and soon decided to play hard rock but with Dutch lyrics, under the name Vandale (a play on the Dutch dictionary Van Dale and the Dutch word for "vandals"). Founding members were Ed Bopp (guitar), Bert van Klaveren (bass), Hans van Klaveren (vocals), and Luc Garé (drums). Hans van Klaveren soon quit, and Bert van Klaveren took over on vocals. Tekkie (real name Peter Titihalawa) joined, on guitar. They were managed by Lou Beerens, a music journalist and photographer, who provides the band with an image and with Dutch lyrics, quite unusual for Dutch rock musicians at the time. Radio DJ and hard rock fan Alfred Lagarde produced their first single, "Wij zijn Vandale", and after winning a talent show the band got to tour ten theaters throughout the country.

In 1982, Patrick Rademaker joins the band on bass, so that Van Klaveren can focus on singing. They record their first album, Schandale ("Scandals"), which provides an insight into contemporary youth culture; the album is also recorded with vocals in German.

The addition of drummer Leon Biessen, who replaced Luc Garé in 1982, made for a much heavier sounding second album, Stale Verhale ("Stories of Steel"). Vandale, despite Lou Beerens's vision, failed to attract a large audience; two singles, "Weet Ik Veel"/"Rad(t)" and "Geitenwollensokkenrockers/Komplete Kicken", failed to chart. The band played at Parkpop in The Hague. A year later, Biessen was replaced by Eddie Rokx, with an eye on a more "swinging" approach. The third album, Fatale Ideale, is recorded but Inelco, their record company, went bankrupt, and the record never got to stores. The band recorded a single in 1984, "Wij Willen Willem", but it flopped, and after the band was dropped by their new record company, WEA, Vandale broke up. Rokx started playing in heavy metal band Zinatra (managed by Van Klaveren), and with Tekkie he also toured and recorded with René Shuman's backing band. Between 1988 and 1990, Bopp played guitar with The Hague new wave band Urban Heroes.

=== 2004-present: reformation and renaming ===
In 2004 the first two albums were re-released on CD, with some previously unreleased bonus tracks. In 2008, back together again, recorded a single, and in 2009 they released an EP, BAM!. During this period, the band consists of Van Klaveren, Bopp, Rademaker, Ernst van de Kerkhof (a/k/a Alan Case, on keyboards and guitar), and Leon Biessen, who had returned to play drums. In 2014–2015, the band is working on an album, with Van Klaveren, Bopp, Masius, Claessens, and now Maarten Cima (guitar). They released a third album in 2017, Kanniebale, with Cima replaced by Freek Bos, on vocals and guitar. By 2019, the band had Bopp's studio, Cloud 9, as a home base. Besides Bopp, the band consisted of Freek Bos (guitar, vocals), Eddie Claessens (drums), Anton Masius (bass). In April 2019, Bert van Klaveren called it quits; Bos took over as lead singer; that same month Vandale played in Sittard, for the first time in years.

In early 2020, singer Freek Bos was replaced by Mark Nunumete, and Vandale, now consisting of Ed Bopp, Eddie Claessens, Anton Masius, and Mark Nunumete, changed their name to Moondawgs—and started singing in English. In 2024, Bopp signed a multi-release deal with OOB Records label based in Rotterdam, Netherlands, and he is back with the long-awaited resurgence of Vandale. Eddy Bopp, in the role of guitarist, producer, and a founding member of this iconic Dutch rock band, is joined by Marcel Van Den Berg on vocals and the 2024 releases feature special guests, like the illustrious Henk Westbroek.

== Discography ==
- Schandale (1981)
- Stale Verhale (1982)
- BAM (2009)
- KanNieBale (2017)
