= List of hard rock bands (A–M) =

This is a list of notable hard rock bands and musicians.

== 0–9 ==
- 3 Doors Down

== A ==
- AC/DC
- Aerosmith
- Ahat
- Airbourne
- Alcatrazz
- Alice Cooper (the band)
- Alice in Chains
- Alisa
- Alkatrazz
- Amajlija
- The Amboy Dukes
- Ampage
- The Angels
- The Answer
- April Wine
- Argent
- Art of Anarchy
- Asterix
- Atomic Opera
- Atomic Rooster
- Atomsko Sklonište
- Attila
- Audrey Horne

== B ==
- Babe Ruth
- Baby Animals
- Sebastian Bach
- Randy Bachman
- Bachman–Turner Overdrive
- Bad Company
- Badlands
- Bakery
- Balkan
- Band-Maid
- Bang Tango
- Barnabas
- Jimmy Barnes
- BB Steal
- Beatrice
- Beautiful Creatures
- Pat Benatar
- Nuno Bettencourt
- Betty Blowtorch
- Birth Control
- Birtha
- Kat Bjelland
- Black 'n Blue
- Black Oak Arkansas
- Black Sabbath
- Black Widow
- Blackfeather
- Blackfoot
- Blackjack
- Ritchie Blackmore
- Black Stone Cherry
- Bloodrock
- Blue Cheer
- Blue Öyster Cult
- Blues Creation
- Blues Image
- Tim Bogert
- Michael Bolton (early work)
- Bonafide
- Bon Jovi
- Graham Bonnet (with Rainbow)
- Boston
- Bow Wow
- Boys
- Brainbox
- Breaking Benjamin
- Bring Me the Horizon
- Brownsville Station
- Jack Bruce
- Buckcherry
- Buffalo
- Cidny Bullens
- Bullet
- BulletBoys
- Bullet for My Valentine
- Bush
- Buster Brown
- BUX
- Glen Buxton
- B'z

== C ==
- Cactus
- Cheap Trick
- Cheetah
- Chevelle
- The Choirboys
- Chrome
- Chrome Division
- Cinderella
- Circus of Power
- Cirith Ungol (early work)
- Clark Hutchinson
- Eric Clapton
- Cold
- Coldrain
- Cold Chisel
- Comes with the Fall
- Alice Cooper (the musician)
- Copperhead
- Coven
- Crack the Sky
- Cream
- Peter Criss
- István Cserháti
- The Cult

== D ==
- D-A-D
- Roger Daltrey
- Danger Danger
- Daniel Band
- Deep Purple
- Def Leppard
- Defryme
- Rick Derringer
- Detroit
- Diablo Blvd
- The Dictators
- Divlje Jagode
- Dokken
- The Doors
- Doro
- Dorothy
- Drowning Pool
- Drugi Način
- Duke Jupiter

== E ==
- Eagles of Death Metal
- Eloy
- John Entwistle
- Enuff Z'Nuff
- Europe
- Epitaph
- Extreme

== F ==
- Fanny
- Faster Pussycat
- Finch
- The Firm
- Floating Me
- Flower Travellin' Band
- Foo Fighters
- Foghat
- Frehley's Comet
- Lita Ford
- Foreigner
- The Four Horsemen
- Freak of Nature
- Free
- Frijid Pink
- Fuse

== G ==
- Gamma
- Geeza
- Generacija 5
- Geordie
- Ghost
- Giant
- Gillan
- Girlschool
- Glass Harp
- Godsmack
- Golden Earring
- Gordi
- Gotthard
- Grand Funk Railroad
- Great White
- Griva
- Derry Grehan
- Jack Green
- Greta Van Fleet
- The Guess Who
- Guns N' Roses

== H ==
- Sammy Hagar
- Halestorm
- Hanoi Rocks
- Hard Stuff
- Lauren Harris
- Hawkwind
- Haywire
- Head East
- Headpins
- Heart
- Heavens Edge
- Heavy Metal Kids
- Jimi Hendrix / The Jimi Hendrix Experience
- His Majesty
- Holy Soldier
- Honeymoon Suite
- House of Lords
- Humble Pie
- Ian Hunter
- Steve Hunter

== I ==
- In This Moment
- I Prevail
- Iron Butterfly
- Iron Maiden

== J ==
- Jackyl
- James Gang
- Jefferson Starship
- Jeronimo
- Jerusalem
- Jethro Tull
- Jo Jo Gunne
- John Paul Jones
- Journey
- Juicy Lucy
- Jutro (early work)

== K ==
- Kahvas Jute
- Karthago
- Keel
- Kerber
- Kin Ping Meh
- King's X
- The Kinks
- Kiss
- Kissin' Dynamite
- Kracker
- Krokus

== L ==
- L.A. Guns
- Allen Lanier
- The Law
- Leather Charm
- Led Zeppelin
- Rita Lee
- Legs Diamond
- Linkin Park
- Kerry Livgren
- Līvi

- Living Colour
- Nils Lofgren
- Loverboy
- Lucifer's Friend
- George Lynch
- Phil Lynott
- Lynyrd Skynyrd
- Jimmy Lyon

== M ==
- Madder Lake
- Majke
- Manic Street Preachers
- Manitoba's Wild Kingdom
- Marilyn Manson
- Mantissa
- Frank Marino
- Steve Marriott
- Bernie Marsden
- Masters of Reality
- MC5
- Metak
- Charlie Midnight
- Montrose
- Ronnie Montrose
- Keith Moon
- Mötley Crüe
- Motörhead
- Mountain
- Moxy
- Mr. Big
- My Chemical Romance

== See also ==
- List of hard rock musicians (N–Z)
