= List of hard rock bands (N–Z) =

This is a list of notable hard rock bands and musicians.

== N ==
- Nazareth
- Nelson
- Neon Rose
- Nestor
- Neurotic Outsiders
- New York Dolls
- Nickelback
- Night Ranger
- Nirvana
- Nite City
- Ted Nugent

== O ==
- Oko
- Osmi Putnik
- Osvajači
- Ozzy Osbourne
- The Outpatience

== P ==
- Jimmy Page
- Ian Paice
- Parni Valjak (early work)
- Petra
- Phantom Blue
- Robert Plant
- P.O.D.
- The Poodles
- Poison
- Pomaranča
- Iggy Pop
- Pop Mašina
- The Power Station
- Pražský výběr
- pre)Thing
- The Pretty Reckless
- The Protomen

== Q ==
- Quartz
- Suzi Quatro
- Queen
- Queen City Kids
- Queens of the Stone Age
- Quiet Riot

== R ==
- Rabbit
- Raging Slab
- Rainbow
- Ram Jam
- Ramatam
- Rare Earth
- Ratt
- Red Rider
- Regata
- Resurrection Band
- REO Speedwagon
- Rhino Bucket
- Randy Rhoads
- Riblja Čorba
- Riot
- The Rockets
- Paul Rodgers
- Rok Mašina
- The Rolling Stones
- Axl Rose
- Rose Tattoo
- Royal Blood
- The Runaways
- Todd Rundgren
- Rush
- Mitch Ryder

== S ==
- Saigon Kick
- Saraya
- Scorpions
- The Screaming Jets
- Bob Seger
- The Seeds
- The Sensational Alex Harvey Band
- Seether
- Shaman's Harvest
- Sharks
- Shihad
- Shinedown
- Gene Simmons
- Sister
- Skid Row
- Skillet
- Slade
- Slaughter
- Sleeze Beez
- Spooky Tooth
- Bruce Springsteen
- Billy Squier
- Starchild
- Status Quo
- Steeler
- Steppenwolf
- Stone Temple Pilots
- The Stooges
- Strapps
- Streetheart
- Stryper
- Styx
- Surgery
- Survivor
- Sven Gali
- Sweet
- John Sykes

== T ==
- Teška Industrija
- Tesla
- Texas Hippie Coalition
- Thin Lizzy
- Thundermother
- Tin Machine
- Toad
- Tora Tora
- Toronto
- Triumph
- Trixter
- Robin Trower
- Trust
- Tucky Buzzard
- Turbowolf
- Joe Lynn Turner
- Twisted Sister
- Steven Tyler

== U ==
- UFO
- Union
- Uriah Heep

== V ==
- Valient Thorr
- Van Halen
- Vandale
- Vandenberg
- Vanilla Fudge
- Vatreni Poljubac
- Velvet Revolver
- Viktorija
- Vixen
- Volbeat

== W ==
- Dick Wagner
- Joe Walsh
- Warrant
- Warrior Soul
- Whitesnake
- The Who
- Widowmaker
- Wig Wam
- Wild Cherries (later work)
- Winger
- Witchcraft
- Wolfmother
- Wytch Hazel

== Y ==
- The Yardbirds
- Yesterday's Children

== Z ==
- Zephyr
- ZZ Top
