= William Hawkins (songwriter) =

Canadian musician (1940–2016)

- William Hawkins and his taxi, 2009
- Born: May 20, 1940; Ottawa, Ontario
- Died: July 4, 2016 (aged 76); Ottawa, Ontario
- Occupations: Poet, Songwriter and Performer
- Writing career
- Years active: 1963-1972; sporadically thereafter

William Alfred Hawkins (May 20, 1940 – July 4, 2016) was a Canadian songwriter, poet, musician and journalist, most notable for his contributions in the 1960s to Canadian folk rock music and to Canadian poetry. His best known song is "Gnostic Serenade", originally recorded by 3's a Crowd.

== History ==
When I started writing songs, it was to put music to Bill Hawkins' lyrics.

Bruce Cockburn (2005), Preface to William Hawkins, Dancing Alone: Selected Poems

I just dropped out sometime in 1971, when I woke up in the Donwood Clinic, a rehab centre in Toronto, with no idea how I got there, weighing 128 lbs and looking like a ghost in my six-foot frame.

William Hawkins (2008), describing his withdrawal from popular music and publication.

=== Poet ===
Hawkins' original interests were as a poet, which he addressed in the summer of 1963, through attending an intensive writing course for aspiring poets offered by the English department of the University of British Columbia. The course became known as the Vancouver 1963 Poetry Conference, which took place over three weeks in July and August, and involved approximately sixty attendees. The course, designed by Warren Tallman and Robert Creeley, involved a juried assessment of a student's work, with invited faculty members including Allen Ginsberg, Charles Olson and Robert Duncan. Other attendees included Denise Levertov, Margaret Avison and Philip Whalen.

Hawkins commenced publishing his poems in 1964, and enjoyed early success. Three of his poems were selected by A.J.M. Smith for inclusion in his prestigious 1967 anthology, Modern Canadian Verse. In addition, Hawkins became known for hosting and participating in poetry readings by major Canadian poets of the time, including Irving Layton, Leonard Cohen, Louis Dudek, Raymond Souster, Gwendolyn MacEwan, Jacques Godbout and John Robert Colombo.

=== Songwriter and musician ===
In 1965, Hawkins commenced his music career as a member of The Children, a seminal Canadian band, based out of Ottawa. In addition to Hawkins, band members included Sneezy Waters, Sandy Crawley and Neville Wells and, in later versions, Bruce Cockburn, David Wiffen and Richard Patterson. The group had been formed at the encouragement of local impresario Harvey Glatt, who also became their manager. It was Glatt who first encouraged Hawkins to set his poems to music. The band developed a local prominence as resident performers at Le Hibou Coffee House, in which Glatt had an economic interest and which Hawkins and his then wife later managed. While they never released a record, within months of their formation The Children were playing Maple Leaf Gardens, in Toronto, as an opening act for The Lovin' Spoonful. It was this particular performance that caused Hawkins to decide to cease performing publicly. The band also opened for The Beach Boys in Ottawa, while successor bands performed Hawkins' songs at the 1968 electoral victory party for Prime Minister Pierre Trudeau, as well as in the movie soundtrack for Christopher's Movie Matinee.

Hawkins' music has been described as being "timeless" and associated with "a beautiful melancholy". He has been described as "a writer of supremely melodic songs, filled with stark despair and raw self-loathing, mixed with dark humour."

In the late 1960s and early 1970s, Hawkins' songs were popularized by David Wiffen, both as a member of 3's a Crowd and as a solo artist. His songs were also covered by other artists, such as Tom Rush, who recorded a version of "Gnostic Serenade" on his Wrong End of the Rainbow album (1970).

Esther Ofarim also recorded "Gnostic Serenade" for her 1972 album "Esther Ofarim". This was re-released in 2009 as " Esther Ofarim in London" and is currently available on CD.

=== Withdrawal from songwriting and published poetry ===
Hawkins encountered increasing problems with substance abuse, particularly alcohol. After a period of time in the Donwood Institute in the early 1970s, for treatment for alcohol abuse, Hawkins largely withdrew from songwriting and published poetry. He opted instead to spend over thirty five years as a taxi driver in Ottawa, where he was ultimately sufficiently successful to be able to purchase his own "plate", or taxi license, rather than renting plate rights from others.

=== Return to music and poetry; tribute album ===
Hawkins gradually returned to music and poetry. In 1997, with the assistance of Ottawa musician Victor Nesrallah as producer/ musical accompanist, Hawkins independently released Dancing Alone. The album was a collection of Hawkins singing his own songs, plus versions of his songs as recorded by 3s a Crowd and The Esquires. The album was a precursor to the later tribute album to Hawkins, recorded and released in 2008.

Subsequent to the release of the 1997 Dancing Alone recording, Hawkins released a compendium of his poetry in 2005, as Dancing Alone: Selected Poems. In this publication, Hawkins collected poems contained in his five books published between 1964 and 1974, plus new poems. Shortly thereafter, in 2007, Hawkins published a small collection of new poems, the black prince of bank street.

In 2008, at the instigation of Harvey Glatt, who had first encouraged Hawkins over forty years earlier, Dancing Alone: Songs of William Hawkins, a two CD tribute album, was released on True North Records, in which various artists interpreted twenty-two of Hawkins' songs. The artists contributing to the tribute album included Bruce Cockburn, Sandy Crawley, Mike Evin, Terry Gillespie, Murray McLauchlan, Lynn Miles, Ana Miura, Bill Stevenson, Ian Tamblyn, Brent Titcomb, Suzie Vinnick, Sneezy Waters, Anne Davison and Neville Wells. Many of these artists first worked with Hawkins in the 1960s.

In 2010, Ottawa-based Apt. 9 Press published Sweet & Sour Nothings, Hawkins' sixth collection of poems. This was the first publication of the poems as a separate book; they had previously been included in a 1980 anthology edited by Patrick White, poet and founder of Anthos Press. Also in 2010, Apt. 9 Press published The William Hawkins Folio, which included a descriptive bibliography of Hawkins' work, as well as reproductions of posters on which Hawkins' work had appeared, plus historical news clippings.

In 2015, Chaudière Books published The Collected Poems of William Hawkins, edited and with a comprehensive introduction by Cameron Anstee. Hawkins' last public performance was a reading from the collection, on November 28, 2015, under the auspices of the Ottawa International Writers Festival.

Hawkins died in Ottawa, on July 4, 2016.

== Bibliography ==
=== Sole or joint author ===
- 1964 Shoot Low, Sheriff, They're Riding Shetland Ponies (with Roy MacSkimming; Independent, Ottawa)
- 1965 Two Longer Poems (with Harry Howith; Patrician Press, Toronto)
- 1966 Ottawa Poems (weed/flower Press, Kitchener)
- 1966 Hawkins (Nil Press, Ottawa)
- 1974 The Madman's War (S.A.W. Press, Ottawa)
- 2007 the black prince of bank street (above/ground press, Ottawa; chapbook)
- 2010 Sweet & Sour Nothings (Apt. 9 Press, Ottawa)

=== Collections ===
- 1971 The Gift of Space: Selected Poems 1960-1970 (New Press, Toronto)
- 2005 Dancing Alone: Selected Poems (Cauldron Books [Fredericton] and Broken Jaw Press [Ottawa])
- 2015 The Collected Poems of William Hawkins (Chaudiere Books, Ottawa)

=== Periodical inclusions ===
- 2008 Peter F. Yacht Club #11 (above/ground press, Ottawa)

=== Anthology inclusions ===
- 1965 Young Commonwealth Poets '65 (ed. Peter Brent, Seamus Heaney; Heinemann, Plymouth). Two of Hawkins' poems were included in the anthology.
- 1966 New Wave Canada: The New Explosion in Canadian Poetry (ed. Ray Souster; Contact Press, Toronto).
- 1967 Modern Canadian Verse (ed. A.J.M. Smith; Oxford University Press, Toronto).
- 1973 Northern Comfort, Transcribed and edited by "Monk Besserer", i.e., Neil Flowers, Commoners Press, Ottawa.

=== Folio ===
- 2010 The William Hawkins Folio (Apt. 9 Press, Ottawa)
