= Dancing Alone: Songs of William Hawkins =

Dancing Alone: Songs of William Hawkins is a 2008 tribute album, released by True North Records. On the record, a number of Canadian artists pay tribute to the songs of William Hawkins, an influential Canadian songwriter and poet.

== Critical reaction ==
The album was generally well received. As noted by one reviewer, "As this multi-artist, two-CD collection proves, Hawkins was – and could well still be – an exceptionally gifted musical craftsman, an imaginative and quirky composer of charming melodies, and a superior lyricist who walked the line between poetic distillation and conversational vernacular. ...His songs here are rendered in exceptionally spirited performances by Hawkins' peers and younger admirers... If you buy just one roots music album this year, this one will not disappoint."

== Track listing ==
1. Scorpio Lynn Miles 3:35
2. Long Lean Lonely Angel Bill Stevenson 3:29
3. Louis Riel Sneezy Waters 5:22
4. The Trains Don't Run Here Anymore Bruce Cockburn 3:22
5. Tell Me That Story Ian Tamblyn 4:36
6. Stone Solid Blue Ana Miura 2:55
7. Royal Boost Sandy Crawley 2:33
8. Merry Go Round Kellylee Evans 4:04
9. Frankly Stoned Suzie Vinnick 4:30
10. Alison Neville Wells 3:35
11. Worry Worry Mike Evin 2:38
12. Gnostic Serenade Brent Titcomb 2:48
13. Io [instrumental] 2:02
14. Funny How People Get Old Murray McLauchlan 3:01
15. Get Free Ana Miura 3:37
16. Misunderstanding Sneezy Waters 5:14
17. Io Lynn Miles 3:21
18. It's a Dirty Shame Terry Gillespie 2:45
19. Christopher's Movie Matinee Brent Titcomb 2:03
20. Your Time Has Come Suzie Vinnick 3:55
21. Midnight Gambler Ian Tamblyn 2:54
22. Cotton Candy Man Sandy Crawley 4:10
23. Merry Go Round Murray McLauchlan 3:45
24. Gnostic Serenade Bill Stevenson 6:45
25. Memories: A Poem William Hawkins

== Credits ==
=== Vocalists and musicians ===
- Bruce Cockburn Lead Vocals and Guitar
- Murray McLauchlan Lead Vocals, Guitar, Keyboards
- Ian Tamblyn Lead Vocals, Guitar, Keyboards, Penny Whistle
- Sandy Crawley Lead Vocals, Guitar, Banjo
- Neville Wells Lead Vocals, Guitar
- Sneezy Waters Lead Vocals, Guitar
- Terry Gillespie Lead Vocals, Guitar
- Brent Titcomb Lead Vocals, Guitar, Percussion
- Bill Stevenson Lead Vocals, Piano
- Lynn Miles Lead Vocals, Guitar, Mandolin
- Suzie Vinnick Lead Vocals, Guitar, Bass
- Mike Evin Lead Vocals, Piano
- Ana Miura Lead Vocals, Guitar
- Kellylee Evans Lead and Background Vocals
- Rebecca Campbell Background Vocals
- Kevin Ramessar Guitar
- Dennis Pendrith Bass
- Tom Easley Bass
- Ken Kanwisher Bass, Cello
- Ross Murray Drums
- Al Cross Drums
- Gordon Adamson Drums, Bongos
- Anne Lindsay Violin, Viola, String Arrangements
- Petr Cancura Clarinet
- Jody Golick Penny Whistle

=== Other contributions ===
- Steve Foley Engineer
- Ken Kanwisher Engineer
- Russ Brannon Engineer
- Ross Murray Engineer
- Roman Klun Assistant Engineer
- Dave Bignell Mixing
- David Cain Mastering
- Chris Wells Cover Painting
- Sandy Crawley Liner Notes
- Doug McArthur Assistant
- Kellylee Evans Producer
- Terry Gillespie Producer
- Murray McLauchlan Producer
- Ian Tamblyn Producer, Mixing, Remixing
- Harvey Glatt Executive Producer
