= One More Time (1969 TV program) =

- Genre: music
- Starring: Gilbert Price; 3's a Crowd
- Country of origin: Canada
- Original language: English
- No. of seasons: 2

Production
- Producer: Sydney Banks
- Production location: Montreal
- Running time: 30 minutes

Original release
- Network: CBC Television
- Release: 10 May 1969 – 14 September 1970

One More Time is a Canadian music television program that aired on CBC Television from 1969 to 1970.

== Premise ==
This Montreal-produced program tended to feature blues styles. Visiting artists included Ed Evanko, John P. Hammond, John Lee Hooker, Lonnie Johnson, Johnny Nash, and Josh White. Series regulars were American singer Gilbert Price and the Canadian music group 3's a Crowd whose members included Bruce Cockburn, Colleen Peterson, Brent Titcomb, Trevor Veitch, and David Wiffen.

== Scheduling ==
This half-hour program was broadcast as follows:

Day	Time	Season run	Notes
Saturdays	10:30 p.m.	10 May to 14 June 1969	
Mondays	8:00 p.m.	4 August to 1 September 1969	
Wednesdays	10:00 p.m.	24 June to 14 September 1970	
Saturdays	6:30 p.m.	1 July to 16 September 1972	rebroadcast

== See also ==
- Music Hop
- Let's Go
- Where It's At
