= The Bunkhouse =

Former music venue in Vancouver, Canada

Coordinates: 49.27655°N 123.1256°W

The Bunkhouse Coffeehouse, downstairs at 612 Davie Street in Vancouver, British Columbia, Canada, was a venue for folk music and poetry readings in the 1960s.

Notable performers at the Bunkhouse included Josh White, Sonny Terry and Brownie McGhee, Jose Feliciano, 3's a Crowd, David Wiffen, Brent Titcomb, Tom Northcott, Ann Mortifee, Joe Mock, the Travellers, Yeoman, and Blake Emmons, as well as impressionist Rich Little and comedian Pat Paulson.

Sonny Terry and Brownie McGhee recorded their 1965 album At the Bunkhouse. Having moved to Vancouver, English singer David Wiffen was invited to perform at the Bunkhouse on a live ensemble album, also in 1965. This became the musician's first solo album, At the Bunkhouse Coffeehouse, when the other invited musicians failed to show up. Gerry Berg of Yeoman said, "We were the first group to play for Les Stork at the Bunkhouse in Vancouver. Blake Emmons got his start there and played the second week after us."

Proprietor Les Stork operated the Bunkhouse, which served coffee and pizza but not alcohol.
