= Where It's At (TV program) =

- Country of origin: Canada
- Original language: English
- No. of seasons: 1

Production
- Running time: 30 minutes

Original release
- Network: CBC Television
- Release: 30 September 1968 – 23 June 1969

Where It's At is a Canadian music television program that aired on CBC Television from 1968 to 1969.

== Premise ==
Episodes featured rock and pop music selections, produced in various CBC production cities:

- Halifax: host Frank Cameron, producer Paul Baylis
- Montreal: host Robert Demontigny, producer Ed Mercel
- Toronto: host Jay Jackson with The Majestics, producer Allan Angus.
- Vancouver: host Fred Latremouille, producer Ken Gibson
- Winnipeg: producer Larry Brown

Anne Murray and The Lincolns were regularly featured on the Halifax episodes, while The Guess Who were frequently seen from Winnipeg and Susan Jacks (Pesklevits) a regular performer on the Vancouver editions.

== Production ==
Black-and-white episodes were produced from Halifax and Vancouver while colour broadcasts originated from the other production cities.

== Scheduling ==
This half-hour program was broadcast weekdays at 5:30 p.m. (Eastern time) from 30 September 1968 to 23 June 1969.

== See also ==
- Music Hop
- Let's Go
- One More Time
