= Simon Caine =

- Origin: Toronto, Ontario, Canada
- Genres: Funk; soul
- Years active: 1967–1971
- Past members: Peter Shields; Dennis Pendrith; John Savage; Tom Sheret; Bill Palmer; Pat Godfrey; Bruce Pennycook

Simon Caine was a short-lived Toronto funk/soul band, which recorded a solitary album in 1970. Most of the musicians went on to become top session players on the Canadian music scene throughout the 1970s and 1980s working with the likes of Bruce Cockburn, David Wiffen, and Murray McLauchlan.

== Early years ==
Singer Peter Shields (aka Simon Caine) first came to prominence during 1966 with the group Simon Caine & The Catch, which included bass player Dennis Pendrith, drummer John Savage, keyboard player Tom Sheret, and guitarist Bill Palmer. Pendrith left in the summer for five months to play with Luke & The Apostles but rejoined that autumn.

The group made a number of appearances on the Toronto club scene throughout the early part of 1967, performing at notable venues like Boris', the Red Gas Room, and the Gogue Inn and sharing the stage with local bands like Jon and Lee & The Checkmates and The Paupers. By June, Pendrith had moved on to play with Livingstone's Journey and the Catch continued without him for a while.

== Transfusion ==
Around July 1968, Simon Caine and Tom Sheret re-emerged with rock band, Tranfusion. The group, which also included future Chris de Burgh sideman Danny McBride on guitar; former Luke & The Apostles and David Clayton-Thomas Combine drummer Pat Little; and bass player Rick Shuckster, became the house band at the Rock Pile, one of Toronto's top live venues.

Throughout the latter part of 1968, Transfusion opened for Blood, Sweat & Tears (September 20), Country Joe & The Fish (September 29), Procol Harum (October 5), the Jeff Beck Group (October 27), and Iron Butterfly (November 9) among others. Caine left the band before the year was out and maintained a low profile musically.

== Simon Caine returns ==
Peter Shields formed a new version of Simon Caine (dropping The Catch) in October 1969 with original members Bill Palmer, John Savage and Dennis Pendrith, who had spent the interim playing with Olivus, 3's a Crowd, and Ugly Ducklings spin-off group, GNU. The new members were pianist Pat Godfrey (born 1948 in Toronto) from The Diplomats and wind instrumentalist Bruce Pennycook (born October 5, 1949, in Toronto).

The new line up signed to RCA Victor and issued a lone single, "Walked Out The Door", written by Pat Godfrey and Dave Richardson, which coincided with an appearance at Toronto's Electric Circus (December 12–14, 1969). The following year, the group gigged intensively throughout southern Ontario and also completed sessions for an album at RCA Recording Studios in Toronto with producer George Semkiw, which was released in October 1970. That same month, the band returned to Toronto's live scene with a show at the Night Owl, followed by an appearance at Ryerson Great Hall alongside Leigh Ashford on November 6, 1970.

Simon Caine should have seen the new year in at Toronto's Maple Leaf Gardens, appearing at a prestigious show that also featured Johnny Winter, Rare Earth, Poco, The James Gang, and fellow Canadians Chilliwack, but a disagreement over the fee meant that the band didn't appear.

Despite a positive write-up in the Toronto Telegram in its October 1 issue, the album didn't sell well. The group started work on a new album in early 1971 with another producer but broke up before the sessions were completed.

== Aftermath ==
Dennis Pendrith subsequently became an integral member of both Bruce Cockburn and Murray McLauchlan's backing bands and later appeared on David Wiffen's 1973 album "Coast To Coast Fever". He currently plays with the Bebop Cowboys and still works with Murray McLauchlan.

Godfrey, Pennycook, and Savage also participated in the Wiffen project and appeared as studio session players on an array of other albums throughout the decade.

Savage and Godfrey spent a brief period with Bruce Cockburn while the latter also did sessions for Tom Rush. Godfrey later moved to Vancouver Island and worked as a film animation composer. He continues to play piano and compose. Godfrey's co-composer Richardson went on to compete at the 1972 Winter Olympics as a member of the Canadian Bobsled Team. He headed south to Florida and the Caribbean as a charter boat captain and moved to Lake Tahoe where he owned and operated a lakeside restaurant and brewery.

Although born in Liverpool, Nova Scotia, and raised in Toronto, Ontario, Palmer returned to the United States to renovate old houses in the Florida Keys. Palmer (Mouse) is living in North Carolina doing meticulously beautiful woodworking. Shields became a teacher at a Catholic school and lives in Toronto. Savage also lives outside Toronto and was last heard working in the construction/renovation industry. Pennycook lives in Austin, Texas, where he teaches in the Department of Composition at The University of Texas at Austin and is a successful composer.

== Discography ==
- 45 Walked Out The Door c/w Scarlet Skies (RCA Victor 1044) 1969
- LP Simon Caine (RCA Victor 4410) 1970
