= Transfusion =

Transfusion may refer to:

- Blood transfusion, the introduction of blood directly into an individual's blood circulation through a vein
- Platelet transfusion, the infusion of platelets into an individual's blood
- Transfusion (journal), a research journal on blood transfusion and related topics published by the AABB
- "Transfusion" (short story), a 1959 science fiction story by Chad Oliver
- Transfusion, a port of the Blood video game to the Quake engine
- Transfusion (band), a Canadian band active in 1968
- Transfusion, a 2005 album by Cold Blood (band)
- Transfusion (EP), a 1993 EP by Powderfinger
- "Transfusion" (song), a 1956 novelty hit by Nervous Norvus
- Transfusion (film), a 2023 thriller directed by Matt Nable and starring Sam Worthington
