= MRQ =

MRQ is an acronym that may refer to:

- Marinduque Airport (IATA: MRQ)
- Marquesan language (ISO 639:mrq)
- Midalja għall-Qlubija, a Maltese medal of bravery whose post-nominal letters are M.R.Q.
- Modern Rock Quartet, a Canadian jazz-rock band
- most recent quarter, in a fiscal year

== See also ==
- MRQE, Movie Review Query Engine
- MRQP, ICAO for Quepos La Managua Airport
