= Harvey Glatt =

Canadian music promoter and manager (1934–2025)

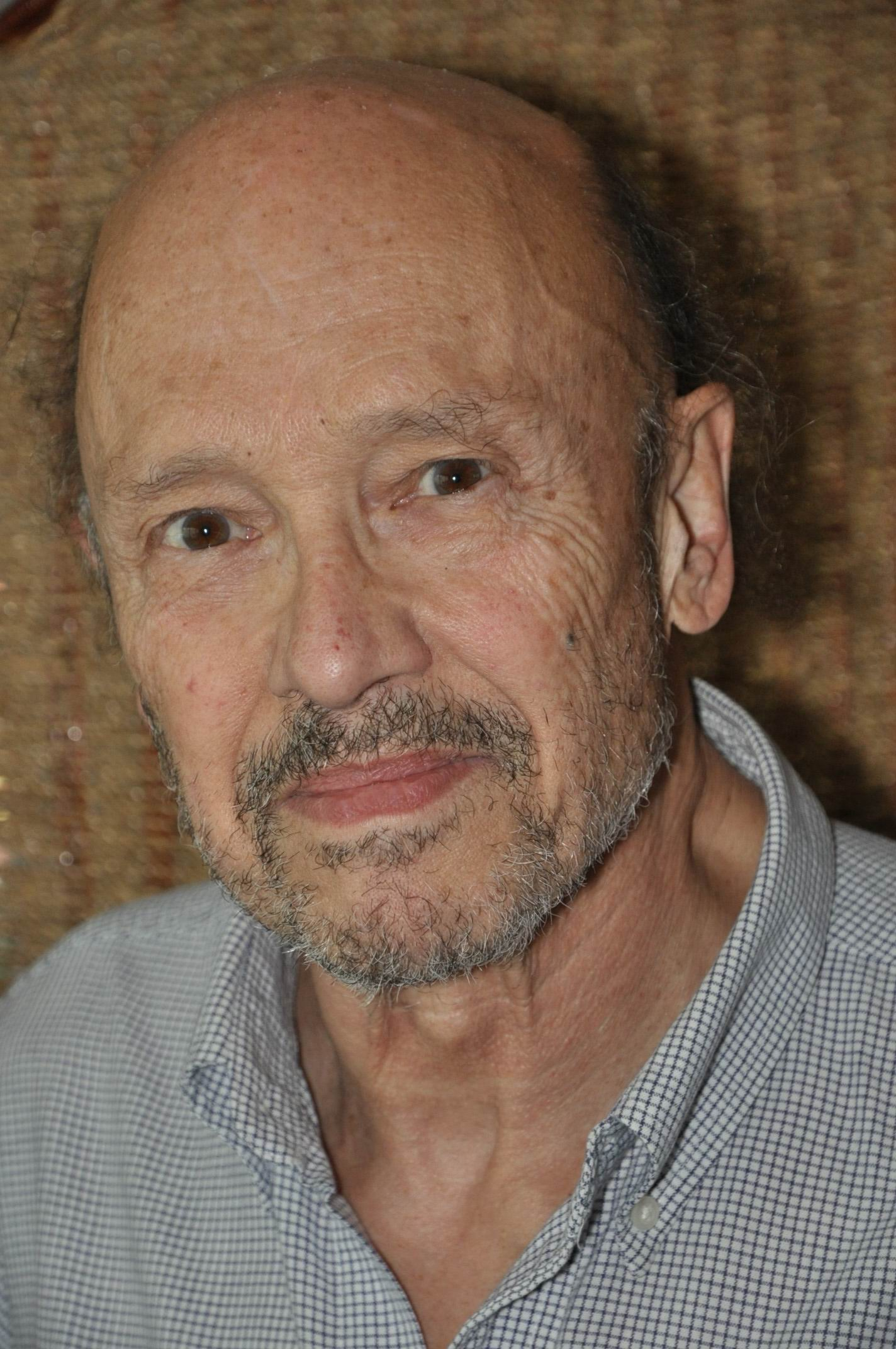
- Glatt in 2011

Background information
- Born: March 28, 1934; Ottawa, Ontario, Canada
- Died: August 20, 2025 (aged 91)
- Occupation(s): Music promoter, record retailer and record label owner, radio station owner
- Years active: 1955–2025
- Labels: Posterity, True North

Harvey Glatt (March 28, 1934 – August 20, 2025) was a Canadian music promoter, manager, broadcaster, record and instrument retailer, and record label owner.

== Early life and education ==
Glatt was born in Ottawa, Ontario, on March 28, 1934. He graduated from Glebe Collegiate Institute in 1951. Glatt thereafter obtained a Bachelor of Business Administration degree in 1956 from the Clarkson College of Technology in Potsdam, New York. While at Clarkson College, Glatt co-produced his first concert, presenting Dave Brubeck in 1955.

Glatt's interest in music developed from an early age. He became a regular reader of Billboard Magazine as of the age of thirteen.

== Career ==
Glatt began his professional association with music in the early 1950s, as a broadcaster, both at Clarkson College and for CFRA Radio in Ottawa. In 1957, initially with partner Arnold Gosewich, who later became the President of Capitol Records Canada and subsequently Chairman of CBS Records Canada, Glatt opened his first retail music store, The Treble Clef, in Ottawa, which grew to a chain of fifteen stores. At the time of the opening of the first store, The Treble Clef was the first stand alone record and music store in Ottawa.

Glatt's first Ottawa concert promotion was a 1957 co-production, with Gil Levine and Max Sternthal, assisted by Canadian promoter Sam Gesser (at the time the Canadian distributor of Folkways Records), of a concert by Pete Seeger. The opening act was Sonny Terry, accompanied by his nephew, J.C. Burris, playing bones. Glatt thereafter formed a loose association with Gesser and Toronto-based Vivienne Stenson, who owned two theatre businesses, to produce a number of concerts, including performances by Theodore Bikel, Tom Lehrer, The Weavers, Odetta, Andre Segovia, Josh White and The Kingston Trio. They also presented the Jose Greco Flamenco Dance Company and one person theatre performances by Emlyn Williams and Elsa Lanchester.

Glatt later expanded into large concert promotion (through Bass Clef Productions), music distribution (through Treble Clef Distribution) and music publishing (through Bytown Music Publishing). Glatt's interest in music publishing had evolved from his management experiences with Ottawa-area bands, particularly The Children, which featured William Hawkins and, in later versions, Bruce Cockburn and David Wiffen. In particular, he had encouraged Hawkins, a poet, to complement his poetry with songwriting. Songs by Hawkins, Cockburn and Wiffen were published by Bytown Music Publishing. Glatt was also an investor in Le Hibou Coffee House, which promoted many international artists as well as local bands, such as The Children.

In the later 1960s, Glatt managed The Soul Searchers, an influential Toronto-based band featuring keyboardist William "Smitty" Smith, saxophonist Steve Kennedy, drummer Eric "Mouse" Johnson and singer Dianne Brooks among others. Smith and Kennedy would later form Motherlode, in 1969.

Through Bass Clef Productions, Glatt became the major producer of concerts of international artists playing in Ottawa. For example, it was Glatt who brought Jimi Hendrix to Ottawa, for an historic concert in March 1968, when Hendrix also met Joni Mitchell. Mitchell was playing at the Glatt-financed Le Hibou Coffee House that same evening. Glatt also produced concerts by Johnny Cash, Bob Dylan, The Rolling Stones, The Beach Boys, Led Zeppelin, Gordon Lightfoot, Anne Murray and The Toronto Symphony Orchestra, among others.

In 1977, Glatt founded CHEZ-FM, an Ottawa-based rock radio station which promoted Canadian as well as international artists. During this period, Glatt also founded Posterity Records, which existed from 1976 to 1981. The label released records by Lenny Breau, the Downchild Blues Band and Ian Tamblyn, among others.

Glatt's radio holdings expanded through the 1984 acquisition of the CKUE and CJET radio stations in Smiths Falls, Ontario, the broadcasting ranges of which included Ottawa. In 1985, he acquired a 75% interest in Calgary's CKIK, assisting it during a period of financial distress, and then selling his interest ten years later. To concentrate on his radio interests, Glatt sold his Treble Clef record stores in 1979 and his Bass Clef concert promotion business in 1985. In 1999, Glatt sold his radio interests to Rogers Media and served with Rogers as a board member (1999–2004) and director of Canadian music development (1999–2005). In 2007, he was an investor, along with Linus Entertainment, in the acquisition of True North Records.

== Death ==
Glatt died on August 20, 2025, at the age of 91.

== Recognition ==
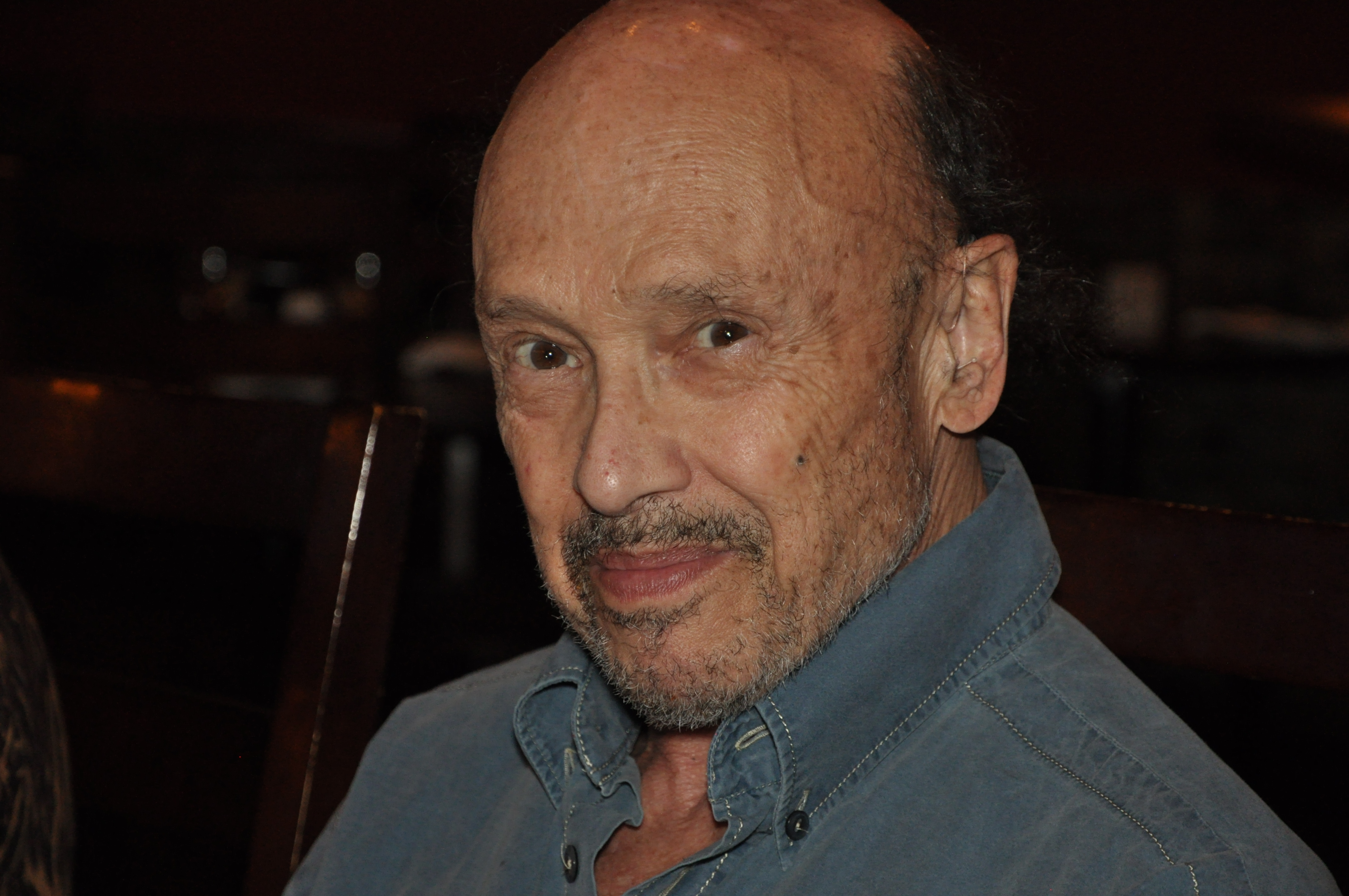
Glatt in 2014

In 2007, Glatt was honoured through his induction by the Canadian Association of Broadcasters into the Canadian Broadcast Hall of Fame. In 2014, Glatt was the recipient of the Estelle Klein Award, sponsored by Folk Music Ontario. A challenge on the fourth episode of the seventh season of Rupaul's Drag Race made reference to Glatt. He received the Queen Elizabeth Diamond Jubilee Medal in 2013 and was named to the Order of Canada in 2022.
