= Walter Rossi =

Walter Rossi may refer to:

- Walter Rossi (sound editor)
- Walter Rossi (musician)
