= Neville Wells =

Canadian country music performer (born 1940)

Neville Wells (born 1940) is a Canadian country music performer.

He was born in Newfoundland and grew up in Ompah, Ontario. He began his musical career singing and playing guitar in the Ompah Dance Hall. In 1959, Wells moved to Ottawa. During the 1960s, he was a member of folk rock group The Children, which also included Bruce Cockburn, David Wiffen, William Hawkins, Sneezy Waters, Sandy Crawley and Richard Patterson. In April 1980, he started a monthly newspaper, Capital County News, later known as Country Music News. He was named Country Music Person of the Year in 1984 by the Canadian Country Music Association. In 1978, Wells established a long-running country music festival, the Ompah Stomp. Wells was inducted into the Ottawa Valley Country Music Hall of Fame in 1994. More recently, Wells has played bass guitar for the band Bytown Bluegrass.

== Discography ==
=== Singles ===
Year	Single	Peak chart positions	
Year	Single	CAN Country	CAN AC
1972	"If You Will See Me Through"	30	—
1972	"The Songwriter"	—	28
1979	"Alone Again with My Flat-Top Friend"	56	—
1980	"Your Memory Hasn't Left Me Yet"	40	—
1980	"Please Don't Mention Her Name"	25	—
1981	"You Can't Quit Now"	37	—
"—" denotes releases that did not chart
