= Canadian Broadcast Hall of Fame =

The Canadian Broadcast Hall of Fame, started in 1982, recognizes Canadians in broadcasting or entertainment related industries who have "achieved outstanding success in helping raise industry standards from a material or humanitarian standpoint." The CAB Hall of Fame honours, in perpetuity, men and women whose contributions had demonstrated an extraordinary commitment to innovation, development and maintaining the highest standards of excellence in broadcasting generally, particularly in Canada.

Candidates are nominated annually by Canada's five broadcasting associations and the executive committee of the Canadian Association of Broadcasters ("CAB"). The name of each inductee is inscribed in bronze on the Hall of Fame plaque at the CAB offices in Ottawa. Personalized plaques are also presented to either the inductees themselves or to their families.

== Inductees include (partial list) ==
- Warren Barker (broadcaster), journalist and news director of CKNW from 1959-1991
- Gerry Acton, former vice president, Canadian Association of Broadcasters
- Bryan Adams, singer
- Murray McIntyre (Jerry) Forbes
- Celine Dion, singer
- Dr. Charles A. Allard
- Marge Anthony, one of Canada's first female all-night DJs
- Randy Bachman, singer
- Walter J. Blackburn
- Rob Braide
- Raynald Brière
- Al A. Bruner
- André Bureau
- George Chandler
- Shan Chandrasekar, president of the Asian Television Network
- Bruce Cockburn, singer
- Thomas E. Darling
- Johnny Esaw, CTV's former vice president of sports
- Reginald Fessenden
- Barbara Frum
- Réal Giguère
- Harvey Glatt, founder of CHEZ-FM
- Harold Greenberg, founder of Astral Media
- Lorne Greene, actor
- Arthur W. Grieg
- Bruce Hogle
- Fred Latremouille
- Donald Lawrie
- Gordon Lightfoot, singer
- Robert (Bob) Lockhart,
- Clarence Mack
- John Arthur Manning, pioneering broadcaster
- Arthur Andrew McDermott
- Anne Murray, singer
- Craig Oliver
- Rai Purdy
- Paul Reid
- S. Campbell Ritchie
- John Roberts
- Lloyd Robertson
- Red Robinson
- Ted Rogers
- Gail Scott
- Gordon Sinclair
- Ian Tyson
- Phyllis Yaffe
- Hal Yerxa
