= CFEP-FM =

Radio station in Halifax, Nova Scotia, Canada

Coordinates: 44°36′53″N 63°29′33″W

- Eastern Passage, Nova Scotia; Canada
- Broadcast area: Halifax Regional Municipality
- Frequency: 105.9 MHz
- Branding: 105.9 Seaside FM

Programming
- Language: English
- Format: Community Radio

Ownership
- Owner: Seaside Broadcasting Organization

History
- First air date: August 2, 2002
- Former frequencies: 94.7 MHz (2002–2009)
- Call sign meaning: Coming From Eastern Passage

Technical information
- ERP: 2,500 watts
- HAAT: 39.2 metres (129 ft)

Links
- Webcast: http://cassini.shoutca.st:8215/stream
- Website: https://seasidefm.com

CFEP-FM (105.9 Seaside FM) is a Canadian radio station broadcasting in the Halifax, Nova Scotia market and licensed to the inner suburb of Eastern Passage at 105.9 MHz. It provides a community radio service.

== Operations ==
The station began broadcasting in 2002, led by former general manager, the late Wayne Harrett.

On June 3, 2008, CFEP applied to the CRTC to amend the licence by changing the frequency from 94.7 MHz to 105.9 MHz. That application to move to 105.9 MHz was approved on August 19, 2008. On March 13, 2009, CFEP moved from 94.7 to 105.9 FM.

CFEP is a member of the National Campus and Community Radio Association.

== Awards and recognition ==
CFEP was nominated in 2002, 2003, 2004, 2005 and 2006 as East Coast Radio Station of the Year by the East Coast Music Association.

In 2022, singer-songwriter Adam Baldwin released "The Voice of the Eastern Passage", a tribute to CFEP and to Wayne Harrett.

== Events ==
In 2018, many radio stations across the country and world began removing or debating whether to remove "Baby, It's Cold Outside" from rotation due to controversy surrounding the songs lyrics. Seaside FM released a statement, reading; “We believe, however, that this classic is reflective of a time during which the lyrics were to be interpreted differently,” it read. “Although it is sparking controversy now, the song is innocent in nature and may be misconstrued, as any song can.”

After volunteering for over a decade, Seaside FM celebrated the iconic career of announcer Frank Cameron on November 8, 2023, with a four-hour long tribute show, with many legendary broadcasters joining to give Cameron a final farewell.

In 2023, due to Bill C-18, 105.9 Seaside FM lost access to its Facebook page due to the enforcement of Facebook's position on Online News within Canada. Due to this, a new Facebook page was created; "Friends of 105.9 Seaside FM".
