= Summer Evening =

- Genre: Music
- Country of origin: Canada
- Original language: English
- No. of seasons: 1

Production
- Producer: Paul Gaffney
- Production location: Camp Fortune, Quebec
- Running time: 30 minutes

Original release
- Network: CBC Television
- Release: 12 August – 30 September 1976

Summer Evening is a Canadian music variety show that aired on CBC Television in 1976.

== Premise ==
This program was produced through CBC Ottawa as a series of concert recordings from the CBC Summer Festival at Camp Fortune in Quebec. Episodes featured performances from such artists as Liam Clancy, Shirley Eikhard, Kevin Gillis, Eric and Martha Nagler, Ron Nigrini, Sneezy Waters and Robin Moir.

== Scheduling ==
This half-hour program was broadcast on Thursdays at 9:00 p.m. from 12 August to 30 September 1976.
