= Réal Giguère =

Canadian television host and broadcaster (1933–2019)

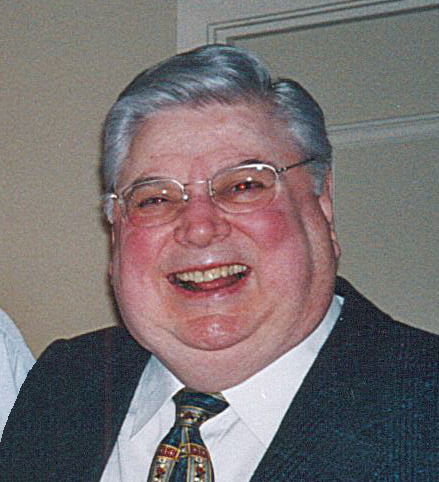
- Born: 24 May 1933; Montreal, Quebec, Canada
- Died: 11 February 2019 (aged 85); Montreal, Quebec, Canada
- Occupation: Radio announcer
- Years active: 1956–2019

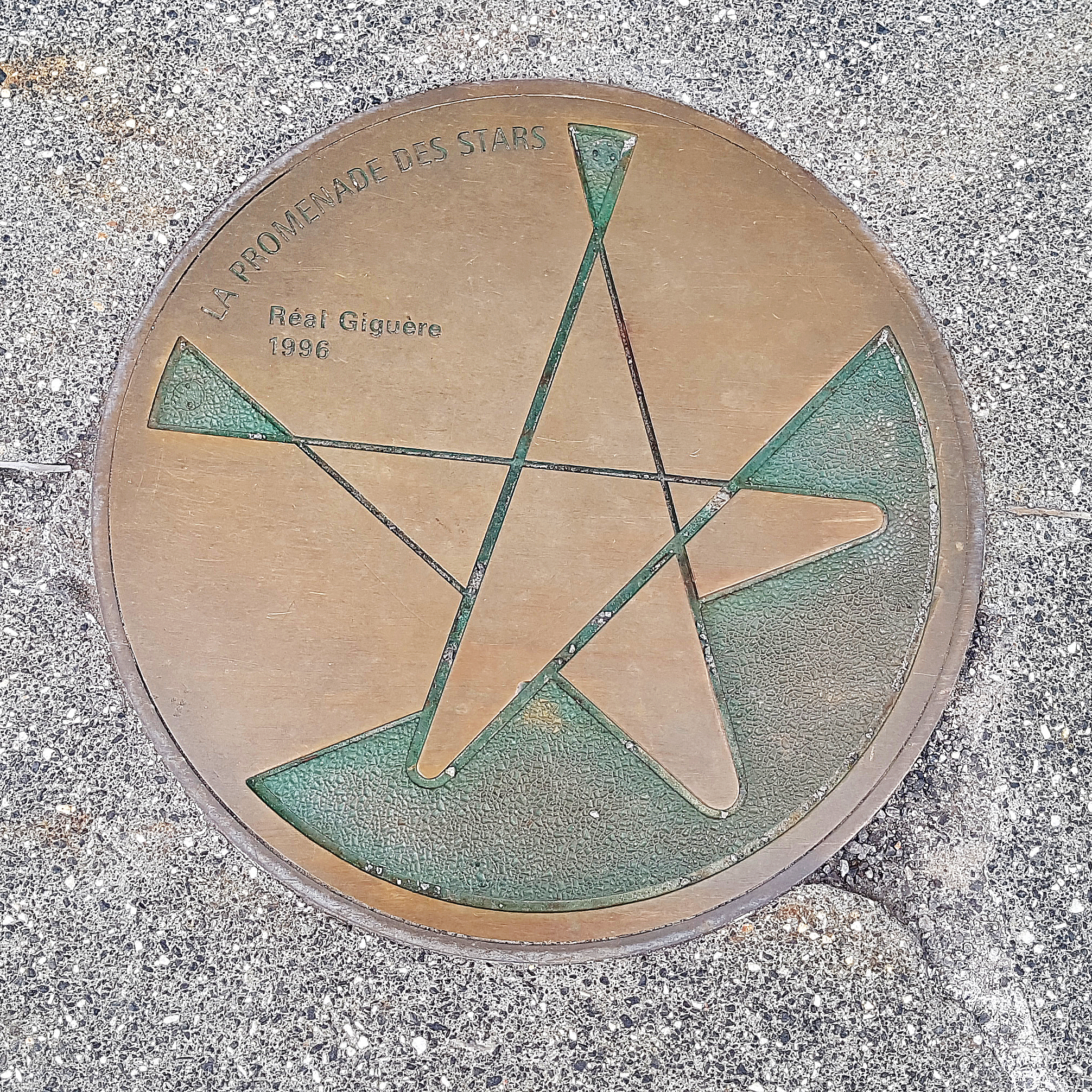
Plaque along La Promenade des Stars in Montreal

Réal Giguère (24 May 1933 – 11 February 2019) was a Canadian television host and broadcaster.

== Early life ==
He began his career as a radio announcer from 1956 to 1961. He worked as a talk show host on French Canadian network television: Dix sur dix, Madame est servie and Parle, parle, jase, jase. He hosted game shows as well, such as Galaxie and the French Canadian version of Jeopardy!. He was also an author for TV series such as Dominique, Métro, boulot, dodo and L'or du temps. He played acting parts in Caïn – a play that he authored – and in La Cage aux Folles. In 2001, Giguère was inducted into the Canadian Broadcast Hall of Fame. He died at Hôpital Maisonneuve-Rosemont in Montreal on 11 February 2019 from pulmonary complications.
