= Kellylee Evans =

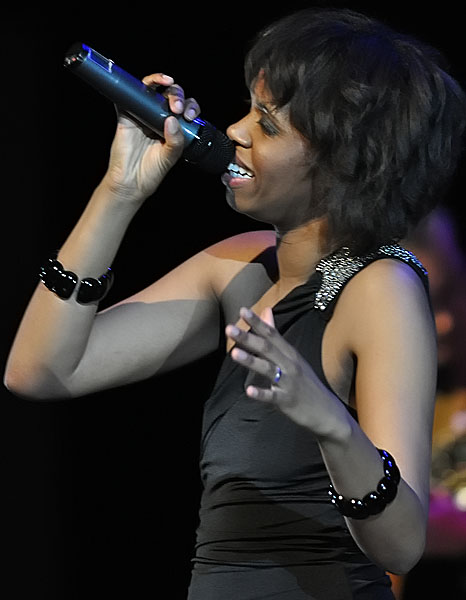
- Kellylee Evans, 2011

Background information
- Born: Kellylee Alverna Evans; 7 February 1975 (age 51); Scarborough, Ontario, Canada
- Genres: Jazz, soul, blues
- Occupation: Vocalist
- Years active: 1990s–present
- Labels: Plus Loin Music, Universal Music France, Enliven! Media
- Website: kellyleeevans.com

Kellylee Evans (born 7 February 1975) is a Canadian jazz and soul music vocalist.

== Early life ==
Educated at Carleton University (1993–2000), it was there that Evans discovered jazz when she "got lost in the elevators of the Loeb Building and found the Music department on the ninth floor of the A tower." She went on to spend seven years there and earned two BAs in Law and English before starting on her MA in Law in 1997. Those studies were put on hold as she focused on her music career. She later returned to Carleton as the university's Artist-in-Residence.

== Career ==
In 2004 Evans won second place at the Thelonious Monk International Jazz Vocals Competition, where Quincy Jones, Dee Dee Bridgewater and Al Jarreau were among the judges. In 2006, she released her debut album Fight or Flight? for which was nominated for a 2007 Juno award.

Her Juno award-winning album Nina was inspired by the life and work of Nina Simone and was recorded after the French record label Plus Loin Music, who invited her to spend two days in their recording studio to record whatever she wanted. The record was released the same year as her album The Good Girl, all while homeschooling her three children under ten years of age On tours she has opened for George Benson, Tony Bennett, Chris Botti, Dianne Reeves, Maceo Parker, Derek Trucks and Sharon Jones & The Dap-Kings. Notable live appearances have included the Sunfest, the Algoma Fall Festival with Michael Kaeshammer, and in 2012 she will debut at Toronto's Massey Hall, and the Imperial Theatre.

In 2013, Evans was struck by lightning while inside her home. Her career was initially on hiatus as a result, and in 2015 her friend Amanda Martinez launched a successful crowdfunding campaign to help Evans with living and health expenses. In November 2015, Evans then fainted while getting out of the bath, causing a head injury followed by post-concussion syndrome. As a result of breathing difficulties and dizziness she was unable to sing. However, eventually Evans returned to singing in 2018 and that year was nominated for the JUNO Award for Vocal Jazz Album of the Year for her album Come On. The album was recorded in Belgium, and explores the different stages of a relationship.

She returned for her first concert in France on 16 May 2019 for the Jazz Festival à Saint-Germain-dès-près, with two other concerts in France in October 2019 and, finally, a concert tour throughout France from 6 March 2020 through 30 April 2020.

== Notable performances ==
- 2007 Vancouver Folk Music Festival
- 2009 Beaches International Jazz Festival
- 2011 Edmonton Jazz Festival

== Television and film appearances ==
- 4 Square (TV series) – performer/vocalist (2006-2007)
- Heartbeat (TV series), documentary, 2008
- Getting Along Famously (TV series), Episode 1-03 "Toucha My Hand" – 20 January 2006

== Awards and recognition ==
=== Awards ===
- Thelonious Monk International Jazz Vocals Competition – 2004, 2nd place.
- Juno Awards of 2011, "Vocal Jazz Album of the Year"
- Canadian Smooth Jazz Award – 2007, "Female Vocalist of the Year"

=== Recognition ===
- Barnes & Noble Discover New Artists (selected release – "Fight or Flight?", 2006)
- Toronto Independent Music Awards – nominee (2006)
- 2007 Gemini Awards – Nominated, "Best Performance or Host in a Variety Program or Series"
- Juno Awards of 2007 – Nominated, "Vocal Jazz Album of the Year" (Fight or Flight?)
- Juno Awards of 2018 – Nominated, "Vocal Jazz Album of the Year" (Come On)

== Discography ==
=== As leader ===
- Fight Or Flight? – (ENLIVEN! Records, 2006)
- Fight Or Flight? (Live) – (ENLIVEN! Records, 2007)
- The Good Girl – (ENLIVEN! 2010)
- Nina – (Plus Loin, 2010)
- I Remember When – (Universal Music Group, 2013)
- Come On – (Motown, 2015)

=== As contributor ===
- Independence – by Kobo Town (2003 – track 3 "Abatina", 8 "Beautiful Soul" & 9 "Higher Than Mercy")
- The Gospel Christmas Project – (track 2 "The First Noel", track 8 "God Rest Ye Merry Gentlemen", track 11 "Oh Holy Night" – CBC Records 3023, 2007)
- Dancing Alone: Songs of William Hawkins- 2008 – (Contributor, Track 8 "Merry Go Round")
- Embracing Voices – by Jane Bunnett (Vocalist and co-writer – track 1 "Sway", track 2 "Kaleidoscope", track 4 "Serafina" and track 12 "The Only One") – winner, 2009 Juno Award for Contemporary Jazz Album of the Year
- Nomadic Injections – by Shamik – (2010 – track 14 "Lost (live)")
- The Manhattan Connection – by Various Artists, Songs of Jose Mari Chan – 2011 – (track 4, "I Have Found My World in You" and track 7, "Easier Said Than Done")
- Ottawa for Haiti – by Various Artists – (2011, Track 9, 'Still I Rise')
- Northern Faction 5 – by Various Artists (2012, Balanced Records Inc, Track 6 – "Lost" [Rise Ashen Remix])

== See also ==
- Music of Canada
- Canadian jazz
- List of Canadian musicians
