= The Esquires (Canadian band) =

Canadian music group

- Origin: Ottawa, Ontario, Canada
- Genre: Pop
- Years active: 1962-1967
- Labels: Capitol; Columbia
- Past members: Bob Harrington; Don Norman; Brian Lewicki; Gary Comeau; Paul Huot; Andy Legault; Clint Hierlihy; Richard Patterson; Gail Thompson; Bert Hurd; Ted Gerow; John Cassidy; Bernie Jessome; Douglas Orr; Bruce Cockburn; Robert Coulthart; Mike Argue
- Website: http://www.spotlightheroes.com/Esquires

The Esquires were a Canadian band, based in Ottawa, active from 1962 to 1967. The band is notable as the recipient of the first Juno Award in Canada, as well as being one of Canada's earlier pop music recording acts. The first Canadian music video ever made is said to be that of an Esquires song. The band is also notable as having had Bruce Cockburn as a later member, and also for one of its hit songs, "It's a Dirty Shame", having been written by William Hawkins.

== History ==
The Esquires (not to be confused with the earlier-founded (1957) R&B group The Esquires from Milwaukee, Wisconsin) were co-founded in Ottawa, in 1962, by Clint Hierlihy and Gary Comeau, while both were still in high school. The band developed a strong local following during the 1962–1963 period, modeling their sound on that of Cliff Richard and the Shadows. The group attracted the attention of Montreal singer Marty Hill. They were asked to back Montreal singer Andy Kim for his performance during Dick Clark's Caravan of Stars in Montreal, where the band played on the same bill as Gene Pitney, The Dovells, Paul and Paula, and The Tymes.

The Esquires were signed to Capitol Records in 1963, and are considered to have been the first Canadian pop band to be signed to a major label. In 1964, they received the RPM Award, a predecessor to the Juno Awards, as Best Vocal and Instrumental Group. They became the opening act for some of the major performers of the day, including The Rolling Stones, The Beach Boys, the Dave Clark Five, and Roy Orbison. The Esquires issued a series of singles, the biggest hit of which was "So Many Other Boys" (1964) and one album, Introducing The Esquires.

Lead singer Don Norman, who had succeeded Bob Harrington as vocalist, split acrimoniously with the group in 1965, leading to a lawsuit when he named his new group Don Norman and The Esquires. Norman gave up his claim to The Esquires name, but his departure from the group is said to have cost them their contract with Capitol Records. Norman continued as Don Norman and The Other Four, with ex-Esquire Gary Comeau joining him.

The Esquires switched to Columbia Records, issuing two singles (including "It's a Dirty Shame" by William Hawkins), prior to breaking up in 1967. Band members continued their music careers in such bands as The Staccatos (later reformed as The Five Man Electrical Band), The Townsmen, The Modern Rock Quartet, 3's a Crowd, Canada Goose, and James Leroy and Denim.

In 1987, the band reunited to commemorate its 25th anniversary, playing at a benefit concert for the Children's Hospital of Eastern Ontario. Appearing were Norman, Huot, Hierlihy, Comeau, Patterson, and Lewicki. The day was proclaimed by the City of Ottawa to be "Esquires Day", in the band's honour.

In 1987, two music clips featuring the band were discovered: "The Man From Adano" and "Gee Whiz It's You". "The Man From Adano" clip is considered to be the first Canadian music video ever made. The original footage was donated to the National Archives of Canada.

== Discography ==
=== Singles ===
- 1963 "Atlantis"/"I've Lost My Girl" (Capitol)
- 1964 "The Man from Adano"/"Gee Whiz It's You" (Capitol)
- 1964 "So Many Other Boys"/"The Oldest Story" (Capitol) [No. 9 CAN]
- 1965 Cry Is All I Do"/"We've Got a Future" (Capitol) [No. 39 CAN]
- 1965 Love's Made a Fool of You"/"Summertime" (Capitol) [No. 19 CAN]
- 1966 "It's a Dirty Shame"/"The Sea Rushes to the Shore" (Columbia)
- 1966 "Love Hides a Multitude of Sins/"Why Should I Care?" (Columbia)

=== Albums ===
- 1964 Introducing The Esquires (Capitol; CD reissue 2003, EMI Canada)
