= Luke & The Apostles =

- Origin: Toronto, Ontario, Canada
- Genre: Blues
- Years active: 1964–2026
- Label: Elektra
- Spinoffs: McKenna Mendelson Mainline, Kensington Market, The MRQ
- Spinoff of: Mike's Trio
- Past members: Mike McKenna; Graham Dunsmore; Rick McMurray; Luke Gibson; Peter Jermyn; Jim Jones; Pat Little; Ray Bennett; Dennis Pendrith; Bob Kendall; Danny McBride; Denny Gerrard; Bruce Palmer; Jack Geisinger; Walter Rossi; Mike Driscoll; David Martin; Bill Miller; Frank Sedlak; Whitey Glan Pentti Glan; Uli Bohnet; Rob Kirkpatrick; Jim Morgan; Dave Breckels; Ed Ham; Jeff Ham
- Website: lukeandtheapostles.com

Luke & The Apostles is a 1960s blues group from Toronto, Ontario, Canada. The band is known for their 1967 hit "Been Burnt". Band members included Canadian guitarist Mike McKenna, Luke Gibson, Peter Jermyn, Jim Jones, and Pat Little. The band is considered to be innovators of the electric blues in the Toronto music scene of the sixties.

Many of the band members went on to form other notable Canadian bands such as McKenna Mendelson Mainline, Kensington Market, and The Modern Rock Quartet (The MRQ).

== Early years ==
Luke & The Apostles emerged from the blues band Mike's Trio in 1964. The group was the brainchild of school friends, guitarist Mike McKenna (born April 15, 1946, in Toronto), who had previously played in Whitey & The Roulettes (which also featured drummer Pentti "Whitey" Glan), and bass player Graham Dunsmore. Joining forces with drummer Rick McMurray, Mike's Trio started gigging at the Cellar club in Toronto's Yorkville Village playing Jimmy Reed covers, "Walkin' the Dog", among others.

Sometime in late 1964, McMurray introduced singer Luke Gibson (born October 5, 1946, in Toronto), who was joined soon afterwards by classically trained keyboard player Peter Jermyn (born November 6, 1946, in Kingston, Ontario).

After Jermyn coined the name, Luke & The Apostles – a reference to a very successful local group called Robbie Lane and the Disciples – became a regular fixture on the local club scene, first working at the El Patio and then later the Purple Onion.

== The group signs to Elektra ==
Shortly before the band started playing at the Purple Onion, a new bass player, Jim Jones, was brought in to replace Graham Dunsmore while Ray Bennett augmented the lineup on harmonica for several months (later joining The Heavenly Government) and ended up composing "Been Burnt", the A-side to Luke & The Apostles' solitary single for Elektra Records. One evening in September 1965, Elektra talent scout, Paul Rothchild caught the band at the Purple Onion and asked singer Luke Gibson to audition the band for his label boss, Jac Holzman by singing over the phone!

After signing a deal with Elektra, the band flew down to New York and recorded two tracks, Bennett's "Been Burnt" backed by McKenna's "Don’t Know Why" for a prospective single. The two recordings were readied for release but then disaster struck. Paul Rothchild was arrested for marijuana possession and the single was delayed for a year while he served a prison sentence.

Over the summer Jim Jones left the band and was replaced for five months by Dennis Pendrith (born September 13, 1949, in Toronto). On July 21, 1966, Luke & The Apostles found a new home at Boris' in Toronto, where the band continued to play throughout 1966 and until the summer of 1967. During this period, the group also played occasional dates at the El Patio and the Gogue Inn among other venues. ("I don't remember the Gogue Inn, but I do remember a lot of high schools and northern 'tours': Elliot Lake, Sault Ste. Marie, North Bay, etc., and Montreal and Ottawa." - P. Jermyn)

One of the most prestigious shows the group played during this time was a 14-hour-long rock show held at Maple Leaf Gardens on September 24, 1966, alongside the cream of the city's local bands. The following month, however, Jim Jones returned to the group's ranks and Pendrith returned to his previous employer Simon Caine & The Catch. At the same time, Pat Little came in to replace Rick McMurray on drums.

On October 15, 1966, Luke & The Apostles joined local bands, The Counts, The Big Town Boys and The Canadian Del-Tones for a show at the recently opened Club Kingsway in Toronto opening for Neil Diamond. Soon afterwards, Peter Jermyn briefly left the band for a few months and was replaced by Bob Kendall, who joined The Bedtime Story in December 1966 when Jermyn returned.

== Albert Grossman and Bill Graham’s interest ==
On January 6, 1967, Luke & The Apostles played at the newly opened, Boris' Red Gas Room, upstairs from Boris'.

Although the group's single had still not been released, the opportunity to return to New York in mid-April to perform at the Cafe au Go Go for a week bode well for the future. While Elektra had decided not to release the single, the label still expressed an interest in recording the band. During its time at the Cafe au Go Go, Elektra booked the group into its New York studios for a day to record an album's worth of material, including the tracks, "I Don't Feel Like Trying" and "So Long Girl".

In its first stand at the Cafe au Go Go, Luke & The Apostles backed folkie Dave Van Ronk but were so well received that the club owner asked the band to return for on a second week in late May, opening for The Grateful Dead.

During one of the Cafe au Go Go shows, Bob Dylan and Paul Butterfield Blues Band's manager Albert Grossman and rock promoter Bill Graham approached the band offering a management contract. Bill Graham also promised the band a slot at the Fillmore West in California that summer.

== The group fragments ==
Unable to reconcile differences over the potential offers as well as differences in personal ambitions, the group returned to Toronto to reassess its future. Shortly afterwards, Bill Graham approached Luke & The Apostles and asked them to open for Jefferson Airplane and The Grateful Dead at Toronto's Nathan Phillips Square on July 23, 1967, in front of 50,000.

Luke & The Apostles repeated their support act at the O'Keefe Centre from July 31–August 5, during which the group performed a version of Neil Young's "Mr Soul", as well as covers of blues favourites "Good Morning Little School Girl" and "You Can't Judge A Book By The Cover".

However, following a show at Boris' Red Gas Room on August 6, Luke Gibson accepted an offer to join the progressive folk-rock outfit, Kensington Market and the rest of the band members went their separate ways.

After passing on an offer to join The Blues Project, Peter Jermyn moved to Ottawa to join the band Heart, which evolved into The Modern Rock Quartet. Jim Jones meanwhile played with several Toronto bands, including The Artist Jazz Band.

McKenna joined The Ugly Ducklings before forming the highly respected blues outfit, McKenna Mendelson Mainline in the summer of 1968. Little joined forces with future Blood, Sweat & Tears' singer David Clayton-Thomas in his group David Clayton-Thomas Combine in February 1968 (appearing on the original version of "Spinning Wheel") and then joined The Georgian IV People (later better known as Chimo!).

== The band reforms ==
Gibson, McKenna and Little discussed the idea of reforming the band in February 1970. To complete the lineup, they recruited former Transfusion and Leather guitarist Danny McBride on second lead guitar and ex-The Paupers bass player Denny Gerrard (born February 28, 1947, in Scarborough, Ontario).

The new lineup, however, only lasted a few days and former Buffalo Springfield bass player Bruce Palmer (born September 9, 1946, in Toronto) replaced Gerrard. On February 15, the new lineup opened for Johnny Winter at Toronto's Massey Hall. However, due to musical differences and personality conflicts, the lineup remained unsettled.

Former Influence bass player, Jack Geisinger (born March, 1945 in Czechoslovakia) replaced Palmer later that month and Luke & The Apostles performed at Toronto's Electric Circus on March 13–14, before appearing at the Toronto Rock Festival at Varsity Arena on March 26 alongside Funkadelic, Nucleus, Damage and others.

The new lineup recorded a single for Bernie Finkelstein's True North Records, which coupled Gibson, McKenna and Little’s "You Make Me High" with Gibson's "Not Far Off". The single reached #27 on Canada's RPM chart in October 1970.

== The end of the reunion ==
The band embarked on a brief tour of Boston with Mountain in early April. Luke & The Apostles then returned to Toronto to play at the Electric Circus on May 9 after which McKenna left to rejoin his former band, now going by the name Mainline. The group then appeared at the "Peace Festival" at Varsity Arena on June 19–21 with Rare Earth, the SRC, Bush, George Olliver & Natural Gas, Nucleus and others before McBride also departed. He later became a member of Chris De Burgh's backing band.

Luke & The Apostles turned to Geisinger’s former Influence compatriot, Walter Rossi (born on May 29, 1947 in Naples, Italy), who was playing with The Buddy Miles Express at the time. With Rossi added to the lineup, Luke & The Apostles made a prestigious appearance at the Strawberry Fields Festival at Mosport Park, Ontario over the weekend of August 7–8, 1970. The group also made a number of appearances at the Canadian National Exhibition bandstand later that month.

On September 1, 1970, the group made a one-off appearance at Ungano's in New York before returning to Toronto but the end was in sight. Shortly after a show at Kipling Collegiate on October 9, Luke Gibson left for a solo career followed by Pat Little and the remaining members recruited ex-Wizard drummer Mike Driscoll, performing as The Apostles before splitting in early 1971. Rossi went on to record a heavy rock album as Charlee in early 1972 with help from Geisinger and Driscoll before embarking on a successful solo career.

Gibson recorded a lone album for True North Records with help from Dennis Pendrith, Jim Jones, and Bruce Cockburn but later eschewed a singing career. He now works as a film set painter. Little rejoined Chimo! for the band's final single and then hooked up with Rick James in Heaven and Earth for two singles on RCA Victor in July 1971. He then played with Flag and also reunited with McKenna to record two 45s and an unreleased album with DiamondBack, which has just been released by Pacemaker Records.

== 1990s revival ==
In the late 1990s, Gibson, Jermyn, Jones, and McKenna reformed the group with future Downchild Blues Band drummer Mike Fitzpatrick for the "Toronto Rock Revival" concert held at the Warehouse on May 2, 1999. Later that year Jermyn, Jones and McKenna became house band at the Yorkville club, Blues on Bellair and were joined intermittently by Gibson.

== Current ==
In 2009, McKenna and Gibson began talking about putting a new band together and playing on a regular basis. The decision was made and the McKenna-Gibson Band was formed featuring David Martin on drums and percussion; William (Bill) Miller on bass; and Frank Sedlak on keyboards, vibes and backup vocals. The set list was made up of a mix of Mainline and Apostles' material, blues standards, and new material penned primarily by Luke Gibson. The band made a successful debut at Toronto's Black Swan Tavern on December 12, 2009, and they still regularly perform there as Luke and the Apostles as of 2026.

In 2013, Luke & The Apostles reformed again with 3 original members, Gibson, McKenna, and Jermyn. In 2017, the self-titled album Luke & The Apostles was released on True North Records. Arriving more than 50 years after their first single "Been Burnt," it was the band's first full-length release. Along with Gibson, McKenna, and Jermyn the album also featured drummer Whitey Glan reuniting with McKenna after playing together their early group Whitey & The Roulettes, as well as bassist Uli Bohnet. The band has celebrated two significant milestones in recent years with a sold out 50th anniversary show at Hugh's Room in Toronto in 2014, and a sold out 60th anniversary show at Hugh's Room Live in Toronto in 2024. The 2014 Hugh's Room show has a full production video posted on YouTube titled "Luke and the Apostles-The Toronto Sound".

== Discography ==
=== Singles ===
- 45 Been Burnt c/w Don't Know Why (Bounty 45105) 1967
- 45 Been Burnt c/w Don't Know Why (Elektra 45105) 1967
- 45 You Make Me High c/w Not Far Off (TN 101) 1970
- 45 You Make Me High c/w You Make Me High (TN 102) 1970
- 1967 "Been Burnt" Various - Gravel Volume 4 (Kumquat May)
- 1970 "You Make Me High"

=== Album ===
- Luke & The Apostles 2017

== Footnotes ==
=== References ===
- The Toronto Telegram's After Four section on Thursdays listed live dates in the city
- "Luke and the Apostles join the exodus to US gold fields", Toronto Daily Star, May 20, 1967, page 31
- "Luke and the Apostles coming out of their cellar", Toronto Daily Star, February 14, 1970, page 63
- "Johnny Winter was stunning for a while", Toronto Daily Star, February 16, 1970, page 23
- "Son of Luke & The Apostles", Toronto Telegram, After Four section, February 19, 1970, page 28
- "1,500 rock groups in search of smash record", Toronto Telegram, After Four section, September 17, 1970, page 33
