= David Wiffen (album) =

Studio album by David Wiffen
- Released: April 1971
- Recorded: 1971
- Genre: Country rock/Folk rock
- Length: 29:00
- Label: Fantasy
- Producer: Ed Bogas

David Wiffen chronology
Live at The Bunkhouse (1965)	David Wiffen (1971)	Coast to Coast Fever (1973)

David Wiffen is the first studio album and second solo album by Canadian singer-songwriter David Wiffen. The standout tracks are "I've Got My Ticket", "Driving Wheel" and "More Often Than Not". As one reviewer recently commented, "Its complex arrangements sneak around behind seemingly simple songs which gives the whole thing an incredible depth. Stealing the show throughout is Wiffen's incredible baritone. It's smooth but fractured. It's the kind of voice you wish you had. ...As you'll never own his talent, buy the record and get lost in the wonder and heartbreak..." "I've Got My Ticket" was inspired by Jerry Jeff Walker. The album reached #73 on the Canadian charts. The single "More Often Than Not" was #25 on the Canadian AC charts and #85 on the rock charts.

== Track listing ==
All tracks composed by David Wiffen; except where indicated

1. "One Step" (Kaye Lawrence Dunham) – 2:33
2. "Never Make a Dollar That Way" – 3:24
3. "I've Got My Ticket" – 2:45
4. "What a Lot of Woman" – 2:12
5. "Since I Fell for You" (B.B. Johnson) – 3:28
6. "Driving Wheel" – 4:24
7. "Mr. Wiffen" – 2:50
8. "Blues Was the Name of the Song" – 1:34
9. "Mention My Name in Passing" – 2:20
10. "More Often Than Not" – 3:30

== Personnel ==
- David Wiffen – acoustic guitar, vocals, organ, arranger
- Jerry Corbitt – electric guitar, acoustic guitar
- Ed Bogas – piano, arranger
- John McFee – steel guitar
- Sandy Crawley – acoustic guitar
- Kelly Bryan – bass guitar
- Vic Smith – bass guitar
- Bing Nathan – bass guitar
- Greg Dewey – drums
- Jeff Myer – drums
- Jim Stern – drums
- Jeremy Merrill – French horn
- Germain Wallace – saxophone
- Gerry Gilmore – saxophone
- Bernard Krause – Moog synthesizer

== Production ==
- Producer: Ed Bogas
- Recording Engineer: Robert DeSousa
- Mixing: Robert DeSousa/Mike Fusaro
- Photography: Tony Lane
- Liner Notes: n/a
