= Walter Rossi (musician) =

Italian-Canadian musician (1947–2022)

Rossignuoli (Walter) Rossi (May 29, 1947 – April 29, 2022) was an Italian-Canadian musician who was active from the 1960s to 2000s. As a guitarist, he played for Wilson Pickett and the Buddy Miles Express in the 1960s. With his own bands, Rossi played with Influence and Luke & The Apostles from the 1960s to 1970s. After his tenure with the band Charlee, he worked as a session musician throughout the 1970s with Boule Noire, Michel Pagliaro, and Nanette Workman. As a musician, Rossi debuted with his self-titled album in 1976. Following Walter Rossi, he released Six Strings, Nine Lives in 1978, and Diamonds For the Kid in 1980.

During this time period, Rossi was a nominee for the Most Promising Male Vocalist of the Year category at the Juno Awards of 1978. He later won this category at the Juno Awards of 1980. In between the Juno Awards, Rossi was nominated for Rock Album of the Year with Six Strings, Nine Lives at the 1979 Félix Awards. After two additional Felix Award nominations in the 1980s, he released One Foot In Heaven, One Foot In Hell in 1984. He then worked as a music producer in North America before publishing Secret Sins in 2005.

== Early life ==
Rossi was born in 1947 in Naples, Italy. During his childhood, he briefly lived in Halifax, Nova Scotia, before leaving for Montreal, Quebec with his family. Rossi began to play guitar when he was a teenager. While playing albums by Albert King and B.B. King, he was inspired by Howard Roberts and The Ventures before starting his music career.

== Career ==
For his music career, Rossi briefly played in a masked music group known as Les Cagoulards during the early 1960s. He later became part of The Soulmates in the mid-1960s before becoming a backing guitarist for Wilson Pickett. During his time with Pickett, Rossi became interested in guitar solos while watching a rock festival in the United States. Following the concerts, he began to practice his solos daily for several hours.

During his musical career, Rossi started the band Influence in the late 1960s before playing with the Buddy Miles Express. After starting Luke & The Apostles in 1970, Rossi became a member of Charlee in 1972. While with Charlee, he was asked in 1973 to play lead guitar for David Bowie and take over Mick Ronson's spot. Due to his father's illness, Rossi declined the request to play with Bowie during the Ziggy Stardust Tour.

Throughout the 1970s, Rossi worked as a session musician with fellow guitarist Patrick Miles in Montreal. Musicians that he featured for during this time period included Boule Noire, Michel Pagliaro and Nanette Workman. For his own works, Rossi debuted with Walter Rossi in 1976 before releasing Six Strings, Nine Lives in 1978. Six Strings Nine Lives peaked at #74 on the RPM Top 100 in 1979.

Following the release of Six Strings, Nine Lives, Rossi decided to end his session career and focus on his own music. In 1979, he briefly played for The Bombers. During the 1980s, he released Diamonds For the Kid in 1980 and One Foot In Heaven, One Foot In Hell in 1984. After One Foot In Heaven, Rossi was a music producer in North America before he returned to his music career with Secret Sins in 2005.

== Honours and personal life ==
Rossi was nominated for the Most Promising Male Vocalist of the Year at the Juno Awards of 1978. He later won the same category at the Juno Awards of 1980. At the 1979 Félix Awards, he was nominated for the Rock Album of the Year category with Six Strings, Nine Lives. Additional Félix Awards nominations for Rossi were Producer of the Year in 1983 and Arranger of the Year in 1984. Rossi died from lung cancer on April 29, 2022.
