= Warren Barker (broadcaster) =

Canadian broadcast journalist (1928–2021)

- Born: 1928
- Died: June 15, 2021 (aged 91–92)
- Occupations: journalist, news director
- Years active: 1947–1998
- Known for: news director of CKNW for 32 years

Warren Barker (1928 – June 15, 2021) was a Canadian broadcast journalist and longtime employee of CKNW in Vancouver, British Columbia. He first served at CKNW as its news editor before becoming its news director in 1959. He remained news director for 32 years until he retired in September 1991. He was considered to be a "founding father" of the news division at the station. Barker died on June 15, 2021, at the age of 92.

== Career ==
Barker started his career in broadcast journalism in 1947. He served as news director of CKNW for 32 years, starting in 1959. According to the Vancouver Sun, Barker was a "founding father" of CKNW-Radio's news division. Barker retired from CKNW on September 1, 1991 but remained a contributor to the station until at least 1998.

== Accolades ==
Warren Barker was the recipient of multiple awards and credited with the creation of a file system that allowed CKNW to more efficiently track developing news. In 1988, Barker was the recipient of the Earl Bradford Memorial Award of Excellence in Broadcasting. He was the recipient of the Jack Webster Foundation's Bruce Hutchison Lifetime Achievement Award at the 1993 Jack Webster awards. In 1998, he was among seven broadcasters inducted into the Canadian Broadcast Hall of Fame.

The Canadian Press noted in 1998 that Barker was "considered a legend in British Columbia radio news". In an article for The Province, retired broadcaster Ed Murphy stated that Barker was a "workaholic with an obsession that news must be accurate, well-written and properly presented", crediting this, along with the "eight o'clock news service" and his hiring of "first-class newsmen", as a factor in the station's commercial success.
