= Let's Go (1964 TV program) =

- Genre: Music show
- Presented by: Fred Latremouille; Red Robinson; Chad Allan
- Country of origin: Canada
- Original language: English

Original release
- Network: CBC
- Release: 17 July 1964 – 26 June 1968

Let's Go is a CBC Television entertainment program that aired daily during the 1967–1968 season featuring musical guests. It was the successor to Music Hop, and the show's title was taken from the Vancouver segment of Music Hop. Each day's episode featured local talent from a different city, moving across the country from east to west: Halifax (Monday), Ottawa (Tuesday), Toronto (Wednesday), Winnipeg (Thursday) and Vancouver (Friday). Anne Murray appeared on the Halifax show, before she achieved huge popularity with "Snowbird". The Winnipeg show was hosted by Chad Allan, the former front man for The Guess Who. The Guess Who, fronted by Burton Cummings, played as the house band in Winnipeg. Susan Jacks (Pesklevits) was a regular performer on the Vancouver show before becoming the lead singer of the Poppy Family.

Let's Go started at CBC Vancouver as a summer musical program for teenagers, July 17, 1964, to Sept. 4, 1964. There were 8 Lets Go shows produced and broadcast locally on CBUT Vancouver, Friday evenings at 7:30 PM. Fred Latremouille and Randi Conlin were Hosts, with the Classics as the house band. Regular performers were Gillian Russell, Susan Pesklevits (Susan Jacks), Mike Campbell, Nancy Davis, Tom Northcott, Howie Vickers, Marcel Chouinard, Stan Cayer, and Ed Whiting. Produced and directed by Ain Soodor, script assistant Chris Paton, studio director Al Vitols.

The Classics band members were Tom Baird (keyboard/writer), Claire Lawrence (sax), Brian Russell (guitar), Glenn Miller (bass), Gary Taylor (drums), and Howie Vickers (lead vocalist). On-air schedule was found in the CBC Times records for British Columbia.

On September 28, 1964, Let's Go became part of the CBC network program Music Hop from five cities during the week at 5:30 to 6:00 PM. Fred Latremouille and Red Robinson were hosts for Vancouver's Let's Go, which was seen on Mondays, Winnipeg's show on Tuesdays, Toronto on Wednesdays, Montreal on Thursdays and on Fridays it was Halifax. Performers who joined Let's Go: Patty Surbey, Marty Gillan, Terry Jacks, Joanie Taylor, Bobby Faulds, and Bonnie Huber. The Music Hop program continued until 1967. Lets Go shows from CBC Vancouver, were produced and directed by Ain Soodor, (1964-1966), script assistant Chris Paton. Al Vitols produced and directed Lets Go shows in 1966, script assistant was Patsy MacDonald.

Let's Go shows, starting in 1967 from Vancouver had a new host, Howie Vickers, followed by Mike Campbell, Terry Jacks, Tom Northcott and Terry Frewer, all taking turns. The new house band was named Probably Us, with Bob Buckley (sax), Terry Frewer (guitar), Bob Murphy (keyboard), Doug Edwards (bass), and George Ursan (drums).

In addition to the regular Let's Go performers, new singers were introduced each week, Jayson Hoover, Lynn Brooks, Bruce Bissell, Ted Davis, Nancy Lester, Rik Salem, The Raible Brothers, Rosalind Keene, Dave Sinclair, Kelly Christopher, Mark Middler, Anne Attenborough, Tom & Barry Collins, PM Howard, and Rick McCartie.

A variety of pop-rock groups made appearances such as The Collectors, 3's a Crowd, The Wiggy Symphony, The Shockers, the Northwest Company, the Poppy Family, the Seeds of Time, My Indole Ring, Eric Burdon and the Animals, and the New Vaudeville Band. Featured celebrity interviews included Jimi Hendrix, Stevie Wonder, the Everly Brothers, Moody Blues, The Righteous Brothers, the Beach Boys, the Monkees, the Yardbirds, Vanilla Fudge, and Creedence Clearwater Revival.

The Let's Go shows from Vancouver were produced and directed by Ken Gibson, and the script assistant was Patsy MacDonald. The last Let's Go show aired on June 26, 1968. CBC Vancouver and the CBC network continued in the same time slot with mostly bands and was titled Where It's At until it ended on June 20, 1969.

== See also ==
- Music Hop
- Where It's At
- One More Time
