= Coast to Coast Fever =

US folk rock music recording album

Studio album by David Wiffen
- Released: March 1973
- Recorded: 1973
- Genre: Country rock/Folk rock
- Length: 39:15
- Label: United Artists
- Producers: Bruce Cockburn, Brian Ahern

David Wiffen chronology
David Wiffen (1971)	Coast to Coast Fever (1973)	South of Somewhere (1999)

Coast to Coast Fever is the third solo album by Canadian singer-songwriter David Wiffen. He is assisted on the album by fellow Canadian folkie Bruce Cockburn, who plays guitar, bass and celeste, and also produced the album. The best-known tracks are "Skybound Station", "Coast to Coast Fever", "Smoke Rings", "We Have Had Some Good Times" and "Lucifer's Blues". Seven of the ten songs were written by Wiffen.

== History ==
The album was released in 1973, and was heavily promoted by United Artists, and received positive reviews and substantial radio play. It was nominated for a 1974 Juno Award in the "Best Folk Album" category, but lost to Gordon Lightfoot's Old Dan's Records. It reached #82 on the Canadian charts. The single "Coast to Coast Fever" was #60 for two weeks on the Canadian AC charts and "White Lines" made a brief appearance at #98.

== Track listing ==
All tracks composed by David Wiffen; except where indicated

1. "Skybound Station" – 3:50
2. "Coast to Coast Fever" – 4:01
3. "White Lines" (Willie P. Bennett) – 4:00
4. "Smoke Rings" – 3:57
5. "Climb the Stairs" – 4:07
6. "You Need a New Lover Now" (Murray McLauchlan) – 4:06
7. "We Have Had Some Good Times" – 3:20
8. "Lucifer's Blues" – 5:45
9. "Up on the Hillside" (Bruce Cockburn) – 2:51
10. "Full Circle" – 3:18

== Personnel ==
- David Wiffen – guitar, vocals
- Bruce Cockburn – guitar, bass, celeste, vocals
- Dennis Pendrith – bass
- Skip Beckwith – bass
- Pat Godfrey – piano
- Pat Ricio – piano
- John Savage – drums
- Bill Usher – congas
- Andy Cree – drums
- Bruce Pennycook – tenor and soprano saxophone
- Brian Ahern – string arrangement

== Production ==
- Producer: Bruce Cockburn, Brian Ahern
- Recording Engineer: Bill Seddon, Bruce Cockburn, Chris Skene
- Album Design: Lloyd Ziff
- Art Direction: Mike Salisbury
- Photography: Mike Salisbury
- Liner Notes: Richard Flohill
