= Influence (band) =

Influence was a 1960s Canadian band best known for their mini rock-opera, Mad Birds of Prey.

== Roots ==
The band was the brainchild of guitarist Louis Campbell McKelvey (born 31 October 1943 in Killorglin, County Kerry, Ireland). McKelvey, who had spent the early 1960s playing in west London band, Jeff Curtis & The Flames and recorded with South African bands The Upsetters and The A-Cads between September 1965 and April 1966.

Having arrived in Montreal around October 1966, he initially found work with the French-speaking group, Les Sinners, playing a one-off date with them at Paul Sauve Arena before briefly hooking up with Our Generation in December for a lone single.

== Formation ==
Through a chance meeting with The Haunted's guitarist Jurgen Peter, McKelvey met former Haunted drummer Dave Wynne (born May 17, 1947 in Stockport, England) and recruited him for the new project he was planning. Around the same time, he also befriended bass player Jack Geisinger (born Jakob August Geisinger, March 1945 in Czechoslovakia) who had recently been playing with The Buddy Miles Quartet but was currently unemployed after Wilson Pickett recruited the group for a US tour.

The last member to join this original lineup was English singer Andrew Keiller (born August 16, 1941 in Bodmin, Cornwall, England), who had previously worked with McKelvey in The Upsetters in late 1965 and before that, recorded a solo album in Johannesburg, which was belatedly released in 1966. Keiller, who had moved to Montreal in April 1966, had seen McKelvey playing with Our Generation on a local television station and contacted him.

== Band history ==
Influence debuted on 1 June 1967 at the Barrel, a small Montreal club. Later that month the band added Geisinger's former colleagues from The Buddy Miles Quartet, singer/songwriter and pianist Bob Parkins (aka Bobo Island) and lead guitarist Walter Rossi. The three musicians had previously played together in the early 1960s with Bob & The Messengers and The Soul Mates.

In late August, the group relocated to Toronto, playing Boris' Red Gas Room in the city's Yorkville Village on 2 September 1967. They then performed regularly at the venue over the next two months before travelling to New York during November to record an album for ABC Records at Bell Studios with producer Dennis Minogue (aka Terry Cashman). Released in January 1968, the album included the mini-opera "Mad Birds of Prey", which was "more echoes of Weill's Threepenny Opera than of anything around in rock".

The band then shuttled between Toronto and New York, performing a string of dates at Boris' Red Gas Room throughout the first half of December, then returning to New York to launch the album at Steve Paul's The Scene, opening for Blood, Sweat & Tears over the Christmas and New Year period. During the festivities, Buddy Miles (now with The Electric Flag) joined the band on stage.

However, the album's failure, together with internal conflict, resulted in Dave Wynne's departure in January 1968. Back in Montreal, Influence replaced Wynne with former Soul Mates' drummer Frank LoRusso (aka Yum Yum). The new line up returned to Toronto in mid-February to perform at Boris' and continued to play local gigs, including an extended date at the city's Penny Farthing club from 4–9 March, before landing a support slot at The Doors' show at the CNE Hall on April 20.

Influence then embarked on a brief tour of the US Midwest, supporting Procol Harum at the Grande Ballroom in Detroit from 17–19 May and Steppenwolf at the Electric Theatre in Chicago from 24–26 May. However, the group was slowly unravelling and in June 1968, Andy Keiller left the band, later returning to the UK before emigrating to Australia in 1971.

Back in Toronto, the band resumed live work, appearing at the El Patio from 31 August–1 September, but soon afterwards founding member Louis McKelvey left the band and returned to England. The remaining musicians carried on as Influence but broke up in early 1969 when Walter Rossi joined The Buddy Miles Express.

== Aftermath ==
In March 1969, Louis McKelvey returned to Canada with his former Jeff Curtis & The Flames compatriot Malcolm Tomlinson and together they formed Milkwood who recorded an unreleased LP for Polydor Records with producer Jerry Ragovoy. Geisinger was also involved with the sessions. When Milkwood broke up in late 1969, Geisinger became a brief member of McKelvey's next project, Damage, which also featured latter day Influence drummer, Yum Yum. McKelvey abandoned his music career in the early 1970s, but remained in Toronto.

In February 1970, Geisinger joined Luke & The Apostles and later that year brought in Rossi. The group evolved into The Apostles before disbanding in 1971. Both musicians then collaborated on an LP as Charlee. Rossi later established a successful solo career while Geisinger recorded with the group, Bombers.

Bobo Island, who had appeared on Buddy Miles' single "Them Changes" with Rossi, died in a highway accident in late 1969.

== Recordings ==
- LP Influence (Sparton 630) 1968 (Canada)
- LP Influence (ABC 630) 1968 (US)
- CD Influence (PACE-095) 2014 Pacemaker Entertainment
