= Music Hop =

Canadian music television program

- Genre: Music
- Presented by: Alex Trebek; Dave Mickie
- Country of origin: Canada
- Original language: English
- No. of seasons: 4

Production
- Producers: Stan Jacobson (1963–1964); Allan Angus; Pierre Desjardins; Ray McConnell; Manny Pitson; Ain Soodor

Original release
- Network: CBC Television
- Release: 3 October 1963 – 28 June 1967

Music Hop is a Canadian music television program that aired on CBC Television from 1963 to 1967.

== Premise ==
Pop and rock music was featured in this series for youth, essentially a Canadian version of American Bandstand.

== Production ==
The first season (1963–1964) was a Toronto production with host Alex Trebek who welcomed visiting musicians and introduced songs from the house musicians before a studio audience of dancing teenagers. He was replaced in following seasons by Dave Mickie, a disc jockey for CKEY in that time. Series musicians were Norm Amadio and the Rhythm Rockers, joined by The Girlfriends who were a female vocal trio. The producer of this season was Stan Jacobson.

The second season's schedule expanded to all weekdays with other Canadian cities contributing to the production of Music Hop:

- Mondays: Let's Go originated from Vancouver with producer Ain Soodor
- Tuesdays: Jeunesse Oblige originated from Montreal with producer Pierre Desjardins
- Wednesdays: Hootenanny originated from Winnipeg with host Ray St. Germain (Canadian Country Music Hall of Fame Inductee) with producer Ray McConnell
- Thursdays: Music Hop originated from Toronto with producer Allan Angus
- Fridays: Frank's Bandstand originated from Halifax with producer Manny Pitson

== Scheduling ==
The first season of this half-hour series was broadcast Thursdays at 5:30 p.m. (Eastern) from its debut 3 October 1963. In the following two seasons, it was seen every weekday, also at 5:30 p.m., since 28 September 1964. In its final season, the Friday episode was omitted from 3 October 1966 until its final broadcast on 28 June 1967.

== Reception ==
Music Hop attracted approximately one million weekly viewers according to CBC estimates, mostly under age 20, with an estimated one-third of those viewers adults.

== See also ==
- Let's Go
- Where It's At
- One More Time
