= 3's a Crowd (band) =

Canadian folk rock band

- Also known as: Bill Schwartz Quartet
- Origin: Vancouver, British Columbia, Canada
- Genres: Folk rock
- Years active: 1964–1969
- Labels: Dunhill Records, Epic Records, RCA Records
- Past members: Donna Warner; Trevor Veitch; Brent Titcomb; Brian Ahern; Ken Koblun; Comrie Smith; David Wiffen; Richard Patterson; Wayne Davis; Colleen Peterson; Bruce Cockburn; Sandy Crawley; Dennis Pendrith

3's a Crowd was a folk rock band from Vancouver who existed from 1964 to 1969, spending most of that time in Toronto and Ottawa. The group had some Canadian chart success, but is particularly notable for the caliber of Canadian musicians who passed through its ranks and would later establish successful careers of their own, including Bruce Cockburn, Colleen Peterson, David Wiffen, Trevor Veitch, and Brent Titcomb. 3's a Crowd is also remembered for its association with Cass Elliott, who co-produced the group's only album.

== History ==
3's a Crowd was formed in 1964, and was originally called the Bill Schwartz Quartet (though it was a trio, and no one named Bill Schwartz was in the group -- the joke was that the mythical "Schwartz" wasn't showing up to his own gigs). The group initially consisted of singer Donna Warner, Trevor Veitch (guitar) and Brent Titcomb (guitar, percussion, harmonica), who met when they were playing, in separate acts, at the 1964 Calgary Stampede. The three moved to Vancouver, where they became regulars at The Bunkhouse and decided to form a band.

In 1966, they moved to Toronto and sent a demo tape to Sid Dolgay, who had been a member of The Travellers but had formed his own management company, and he signed the trio. He sent them on the road, and they played clubs across Canada, sometimes accompanied by bassist Brian Ahern. Ahern was unavailable full-time so, in 1966, they added Ken Koblun, late of Neil Young & The Squires and Buffalo Springfield. Although he would reappear, Koblun did not last long; he was replaced by Neil Young's friend Comrie Smith.

As a result of their live performances, 3's a Crowd were named Top Folk Group at the 1966 RPM Awards (which, in 1970, would become the Juno Awards). 3's a Crowd would win the same award from RPM in 1967.

The award led to the band's being signed by Epic Records. Two singles were released: "Bound to Fly" and a cover of Gordon Lightfoot's "Steel Rail Blues". "Bound to Fly", which was also released in the UK, peaked at #34 on the Canadian RPM chart and was the group's biggest hit. The next two recordings with Epic were "Honey Machine" and "When The Sun Goes Down". 3's a Crowd has always injected humor into their performances (Titcomb had been a professional comedian), but they did not want to be seen as a comedy act, and that is how Epic wanted to market them. This was a sticking point that brought an end to the deal with Epic.

3's a Crowd had become a fixture at Le Hibou Coffee House in Ottawa, and there they were reunited with their friend from Vancouver, singer David Wiffen. Wiffen was in Ottawa playing with a folk band called The Children; when the band said they were looking for a drummer, he recommended Richard Patterson, who had been playing with The Children after his band, The Esquires, had broken up. The newly-expanded band first appeared on the TV show Take 30; that led to bookings at The Scene in New York, and the 1967 Mariposa Folk Festival.

In 1967, the band was spotted performing at Toronto's Riverboat coffee house by an entertainment co-ordinator for the Ontario Pavilion at Expo 67 in Montreal and they were hired to play there. Cass Elliot and Denny Doherty, of The Mamas & the Papas, were visiting Expo and Warner's boyfriend was asked to escort them. He took them to see the 3's a Crowd performance, and Elliot was so impressed, she contacted Jay Lasker, President of Dunhill Records. After hearing their demo tape, he brought the band to New York, where they recorded three songs at Bell Studios with producer Rick Shorter. They were then flown to Los Angeles to record an album; Patterson would say that Eliot quickly lost interest in the process and most of the work was done by Steve Barri (both are credited as producers). The album, Christopher's Movie Matinée, was released in May 1968.

When Wiffen and Patterson were playing with The Children in Ottawa, that band had included an aspiring musician and songwriter named Bruce Cockburn. When the former joined 3's a Crowd, they brought that music with them and, although Cockburn did not perform on the album, three of his songs are included ("The Way She Smiles", "Bird Without Wings" and "View From Pompous Head"). They did a slow, military rendition of "(Let's) Get Together" by Chet Powers. Murray McLauchlan also contributed his first recorded songwriting credit, "Coat Of Colors"; "Coat Of Colors" was issued as the b-side of "Bird Without Wings", which peaked at #61 on the RPM chart. Donna Warner was the primary singer, but Wiffen and Titcomb also sang lead.

The band had previously appeared on the CBC's The Juliette Show. In 1968, they performed on the CBC Television series Let's Go. Along with the Box Tops, they opened for the Beach Boys at their 1968 Ottawa concert. And the CBC gave them their own nationally-televised special, Our Kind Of Crowd. As their guests, they chose two relative unknowns, Richard Pryor and Joni Mitchell.

Koblun, citing exhaustion, now left the band for good. He was replaced on bass by Wayne Davis, whose band, Bobby Kris & The Imperials, had just broken up. The workload and touring had also taken their toll on Warner and, increasingly, Ottawa singer Colleen Peterson was filling in for her.

3's a Crowd again went on the road, touring Western Canada and Southern California, playing several dates at the Ash Grove in West Hollywood and the Ice House in Glendale, sometimes adding Jim and Jean as an opening act. Back in Canada, the group played the entirety of their album with the Toronto Symphony Orchestra at Massey Hall. A related documentary about 1960s Canadian counterculture, Christopher's Movie Matinée, under the sponsorship of the National Film Board of Canada, was released in 1968; it includes some of the songs from the album.

Just as Christopher's Movie Matinee became available in stores, Warner's health had declined to the point where she had to leave the band. With her departure, Titcomb and Veitch weren't interested in continuing and they left as well. But the band's manager, Sid Dolgay, had obtained investment in the band from Toronto producers Harvey Glatt and Sydney Banks and the band needed to carry on. In early 1969, Wiffen and Patterson brought in bassist Dennis Pendrith and, from The Children, Bruce Cockburn, Colleen Peterson and Sandy Crawley. RCA Victor released a second single from the album, a cover of Dino Valenti's "Let's Get Together", backed by "I Don't Wanna Drive You Away"; the former peaked at #70 on the RPM charts.

The new line-up returned to the road, spending the summer of 1969 supporting The Turtles and Gary Puckett & The Union Gap on their Canadian dates. They recorded Cockburn's "Electrocution of The Word"; its video was showcased at the Youth Pavilion at Ottawa SuperEX (the Central Canada Exhibition). They also had to move to Montreal, where they became the house band on Sydney Banks' CBC Television show, One More Time, which was hosted by Gilbert Price. The series ended in early 1969. Crawley left to pursue an acting career. The remaining members performed a few US dates, then disbanded permanently at the end of 1969.

== Post break-up ==
In 1973, Cockburn and Pendrith collaborated with Wiffen on his 1973 album Coast To Coast Fever. After that, Wiffen became a successful songwriter ("Driving Wheel"). Pendrith played with Tom Rush and Ian & Sylvia, became a busy session musician and then went to work for the CBC. Bruce Cockburn became an international mega-star.

Peterson joined the Canadian cast of Hair and then moved to Nashville and became a successful singer/songwriter before joining Sylvia Tyson's band Quartette; she died of cancer in 1996. Sandy Crawley became an actor and film composer. Brent Titcomb became a member of Anne Murray's touring band and she recorded several of his songs, including "Sing High, Sing Low" and "I Still Wish The Very Best For You".

Trevor Veitch moved to Los Angeles and became a successful session player, soundtrack composer, and songwriter ("Gloria" by Laura Brannigan). Ahern became a successful producer, with a long list of credits, including albums by Barbra Streisand, Bette Midler, Johnny Cash, Willie Nelson and (his wife) Emmylou Harris.

Richard Patterson played with a variety of bands and was working on a 3's a Crowd compilation album, but he died in 2011 and it was not completed.

Donna Warner, Wayne Davis and Ken Koblun did not continue with professional music careers.

Comrie Smith's subsequent involvement as a professional musician does not appear to have been documented, although he was quoted extensively by Mojo magazine in an article about the release of Neil Young's Archives CD set; Smith, who died in 2009, was a life-long friend of Young's and had backed him on some of his early recordings. (Young's associations with the group create their own fascinating web, what with both Smith and Koblun playing with him in his early days, and Donna Warner having sung with him in Toronto.)

David Wiffen died in April 2026.

== Singles ==
- "Bound To Fly" / "Steel Rail Blues" (1966), Epic 5-10073, #34
- "Honey Machine" / "When The Sun Goes Down" (1967), Epic 5-10151
- "Bird Without Wings" / "Coat of Colours" (1967), RCA Victor 4120, #61
- "Bird Without Wings" / "Coat of Colours" (1968), (USA) Dunhill D-4120
- "Let's Get Together" / "I Don't Wanna Drive You Away" (1968), RCA Victor 4131, #70
- "Let's Get Together" / "I Don't Wanna Drive You Away" (1968), (USA) Dunhill D-4131
- "Electrocution of The Word" (1968)

== Albums ==
- Christopher's Movie Matinee (1968), (Canada, Australia) RCA Victor DS-50030
- Christopher's Movie Matinee (1968), (USA) Dunhill DS-50030)
- Christopher's Movie Matinee (2012), Vintage Masters Inc.

== Film ==
- Christopher's Movie Matinee (1968), National Film Board of Canada
