= Frank's Bandstand =

Television series

Frank's Bandstand (1964–67) is the Halifax segment of the Music Hop series. Frank Cameron (1938–2024) introduced music with regulars Patricia McKinnon, Karen Oxley, D.J. Jeffries and Davie Wells. Brian Ahern was music director and band leader and Manny Pitson was the producer. The music was pre-recorded then performed "live" to video tape from Halifax. Local rock bands had guest shots each week and did two tunes in the show. Bands included the Five Sounds (with Jack Harris), Spring Garden Road, and The Great Scotts. The Axemen and The Brunswick Playboys were also among the frequent guests on this variety show from Halifax. It was well presented and highly anticipated by viewers across the country. According to Cameron, the show was videotaped, then transferred to film (telecine) to be sent to other CBC stations across Canada. Cameron also has said that the show was taped on Saturdays to be ready for the following Friday. (The music was probably recorded days before the filming.)

- Host - Frank Cameron
- Original Broadcaster - CBC Television

The "Frank" in the title of this Friday-evening Canadian variety show was Frank Cameron, who hosted the proceedings from the CBC's Halifax facilities. Most of the talent showcased herein was native to Nova Scotia, though a few celebrities from the other provinces managed to sneak in from time to time. The series was broadcast nationally from October 2, 1964 to June 25, 1965. Most of the production personnel responsible for Frank's Bandstand were also gainfully employed on another tuneful CBC weekly, Music Hop and "Singalong Jubilee".

== Broadcast times ==
Fri 5:30–6:00 p.m., 2 October 1964 – 25 June 1965

== Content ==
Frank Cameron introduced music with regulars Patricia McKinnon, Karen Oxley, D.J. Jefferies and Davie Wells. Brian Ahern was music director/guitarist with the house band, which included Jack Lily on drums, Keith Jollimore on sax, Garth Proud on bass. The studio band was known as "The Offbeats". When Ahern left the show, the new house band was called "The New Five Sounds (Plus One)" Keith Jollimore took over musical director circa 1966, and Paul Baylis replaced Manny Pitson as producer/director.

Also included in the studio band were Ritchie Oakley, Jimmy White, Bruce Cassidy and Joe Sealy. Also renowned world entertainer Anne Murray was a regular guest, in those days (1965–1966) she taught gym classes in Springhill, Nova Scotia, and would drive to Halifax to tape the shows. An LP album entitled "Do You 'Wanna' Dance - Best Of Frank's Bandstand" was released in 1965 by Arc Records (catalog number A-669).

== Sources ==
- http://www.answers.com/topic/frank-s-bandstand-tv-series-1964-tv-series
- https://web.archive.org/web/20100311080903/http://www.film.queensu.ca/cbc/Fra.html
- Liner notes to Arc Records LP A-669
