= Harry Howith =

Canadian poet

Harry Howith (1934–2014) was a Canadian poet.

== History ==
Born in Ontario, Harry Howith received a Bachelor of Arts and a Bachelor of Journalism from Carleton University in Ottawa. He later became an English instructor at Centennial College, Toronto. He died in Kentville, Nova Scotia, June 21, 2014.

== Bibliography ==
- Burglar Tools. Ottawa: Bytown, 1963.
- Two Longer Poems (with William Hawkins). Toronto: Patrician, 1965.
- Total War. Toronto: Contact, 1966.
- Fragments of the Dance. Toronto: Village Book Store, 1969.
- The Stately Homes of Westmount. Montreal: DC, 1973.
- Multiple Choices: New and Selected Poems, 1961-1976. Oakville: Mosaic Press, 1976.
