= The MRQ =

- Also known as: The Modern Rock Quartet
- Origin: Ottawa, Ontario, Canada
- Genres: jazz-rock
- Years active: 1968–1970
- Label: RCA

The Modern Rock Quartet (MRQ) was a Canadian jazz-rock band put together by former Luke & The Apostles keyboard player Peter Jermyn with several musicians who had played with Bruce Cockburn in the final lineup of The Esquires.

== Origins ==
When the original Luke & The Apostles broke up in mid-August 1967, keyboard player Peter Jermyn (born on November 6, 1946, in Kingston, Ontario) moved to Ottawa where he joined the local band Heart, which was fronted by singer John Martin (Jean Martin). A short while later, Jermyn met former Esquires members Doug Orr (bass) and Robert Coulthart (drums), with whom Jermyn had become familiar while with the Apostles, and invited them to join him and Martin in a new group. (Heart continued with a new organist, Jack Arseneault.)

Formed in August 1968, Modern Rock Quartet and quickly attracted record company interest with their unique sound (a guitarless band was something of an oddity at the time). The band was approached by five US labels (including two major players) and in the end, signed with RCA, which invited them to New York to record material (most of which would remain unreleased).

Jermyn first took the band to Toronto in late 1968, where it played the El Patio (December 10–15). Though based in Ottawa, The MRQ returned to Toronto on numerous occasions throughout 1969 and 1970, playing at the Varsity Stadium (outdoors) on June 22, 1969, with Steppenwolf, Chuck Berry, Blood Sweat & Tears, Johnny Winter, Sly & The Family Stone, Procol Harum, Tiny Tim, Alice Cooper, Al Kooper, The Band, Velvet Underground, Rotary Connection, and others, performing at the Toronto Rock Festival (at Varsity Arena, (indoors) on March 25, 1970, with Canned Heat, The Faces with Rod Stewart and Ronnie Wood MC5, Parliaments & The Funkadelic, and others, and appearing at the Festival Express show at the CNE Stadium on June 27–28, 1970 with The Band, Janis Joplin, The Grateful Dead Mountain, Traffic, Ten Years After, Buddy Guy, Robert Charlebois and others.

== Bruce Cockburn ==
The group's lone single, Jermyn's "Plastic Street", backed by "Games", written by Bruce Cockburn and Michael Ferry (Lee Jackson from Jon and Lee & The Checkmates), failed to chart. Both sides were also recorded in French and released by RCA as "Rue Plastique" / "Des Jeux". The group also recorded a couple of tracks that were never released, such as "Revolution" and "Lady of Pleasure".

== Ahead of its time ==
During 1969, The MRQ supported The Who and Procol Harum and The Paul Butterfield Blues Band. The MRQ's shows were highly ambitious and Jermyn's keyboard skills were reportedly a big influence on Keith Emerson. The bulk of the group's material consisted of concertos by Jermyn and Bruce Cockburn songs, which the songwriter chose not to record himself. Jermyn's pieces included "Opening Jam" and the live favourites "Happiness Is Majority" and "Cities Are Tight".

Martin left after the single to be replaced by Bob Blyth, who was succeeded in turn by former Esquires singer Brian Lewicki. The group also added former 1910 Fruitgum Company guitarist Pat Karwan, who soon left to form TCB.

== Peter Jermyn leaves ==
Jermyn lost interest with Lewicki's arrival and following a prestigious appearance at Expo '70 in Japan, he left the band. (Jermyn didn't want to play the bar scene as he thought it was a regressive move.) Drew King from the group, White, replaced Jermyn but the band split up a short while later.

== The Sackbut ==
In the early 1970s Jermyn helped to design a new musical instrument, the Electronic Sackbut, with Dr Hugh LeCaine from the National Research Council. He spent several years doing lecture tours demonstrating the instrument and did the theme tune for NBC TV's children's science programme, Dr Wizard using the Sackbut. During the 1980s and 1990s he did freelance television work and wrote soundtracks for films, including the special effects for Heavy Metal. In recent years, he has joined The Apostles for a series of shows at his Toronto bar "Blues on Bellair" which he owned with his wife Diane. He also played live and recorded in Toronto with Ottawa guitarist Paul Fenton.

== Aftermath ==
The remaining trio of Lewicki, Orr and Coulthart spent a few years playing in a bar called Chez Henri in Hull on the Quebec side of the river, outside Ottawa before breaking up. They reunited in 1974 with Rod Phillips on keyboards, and recorded one 45 for the Aquarius label.

== Trivia ==
The group's first live date was at Prime Minister Pierre Trudeau's official residence.

== Discography ==
- 45 "Plastic Street" c/w "Games" (RCA Victor 1002) 1968

== Footnotes ==
=== References ===
- Peter Jermyn, interview with Bill Munson, 1983.
- Peter Jermyn, interview with Nick Warburton, 2000.
- The Toronto Telegram's After Four Section listed live dates every Thursday.
- “The Freedom of MRQ” article in RPM Weekly magazine, page 3, circa January 1969.
