= Fred Latremouille =

Canadian radio personality

- Born: Frederick Bruce Latremouille; October 21, 1945; Nanaimo, British Columbia, Canada
- Died: March 5, 2015 (aged 69); Scottsdale, Arizona, USA
- Occupation: Broadcaster
- Years active: 1962–2007
- Spouse: Cathy Baldazzi

Fred Latremouille (October 22, 1945 – March 5, 2015) was a Canadian radio personality and actor.

== Career ==
He began working in broadcasting in Alberta at CKYL in Peace River, and soon moved to Vancouver, where he entered radio there in 1962 at the age of 17.

In 1967, he acted as co-editor for the newly created Georgia Straight alternative weekly newspaper. His role included sidewalk sales and a telephone interview with musician John Lennon. Latremouille had been replaced by Red Robinson as the emcee for the Beatles Empire Stadium concert in 1964 due to mononucleosis. Fred and Red were also hosts of the TV series Lets Go, later part of the Canada-wide series Music Hop.

As an actor, he appeared in the movies A Man, a Woman and a Bank (1979), The Changeling (1980), The Plutonium Incident (1981) and Jane Doe (1983). He worked as an on-air host at the CBC, CFUN, KISS FM, CHMJ and Clear-FM.

In 2003, he and his wife hosted provincial Premier Gordon Campbell for a dinner during their holiday in Hawaii. After leaving, Campbell was charged by Hawaiian police for drunk driving which created controversy in his home province.

In 2006, Latremouille and his wife and longtime co-host Cathy Baldazzi came out of retirement and launched a morning show on Clear-FM.

Latremouille was inducted into the B.C. Entertainment Hall of Fame in 2006 and was named to the Canadian Association of Broadcasters’ Hall of Fame the following year.

== Personal life ==
Fred Latremouille was born in Nanaimo and raised in West Vancouver and Vancouver. His parents divorced when he was two and his mother later remarried, to writer Robert Harlow. There, Latremouille attended West Vancouver Secondary School, and then Kitsilano High School. In his late 20s, Latremouille was diagnosed with cancer. In 1986, Latremouille married his co-host at CFUN, Cathy Baldazzi. It was his second marriage.

== Filmography ==
Year	Title	Role	Notes
1979	A Man, a Woman and a Bank	Duty Police Officer	
1983	Jane Doe	Airport Guard	
