= Le Hibou Coffee House =

Coffee house in Ottawa, Canada

Le Hibou Coffee House was an internationally known coffee house established in Ottawa, Ontario, Canada, operating from 1960 to 1975.

== History ==
Denis Faulkner, an Ottawa francophone, was the founding owner manager from 1960 to 1968. It was during this period that Le Hibou (le hibou, the owl) became established as a now famous embryo of the arts. There was no arts centre at that time in the capital city. The National Arts Centre opened in 1969. Faulkner presented pocket experimental theater in French and English - some original works, poetry readings, chansonniers from Québec, the Maritime provinces and France, children's programming, comedy, blues, jazz, rock and folk singing. His objective was to provide an environment that encouraged talent and at the same time groomed local audiences.

In 1965, Faulkner, along with friend and Ottawa architect Matt Stankiewicz, selected and converted a larger site at 521 Sussex Drive to what is now most popularly known as the location of Le Hibou. This heritage building was owned by the National Capital Commission. Le Hibou was not independently wealthy and relied on the Ottawa community to be involved in the experiment. The National Capital Commission was a major contributor to the club through charging below market rent. The Commission's vision was linked to fostering the development of the Byward Market as the hub of Ottawa night life. Le Hibou and several original boutiques set the concept in motion. Stankovicz and Faulkner converted an unoccupied warehouse to a friendly cafe with high ceilings and excellent acoustics. They kept the original tin engraved ceilings and brick interior walls. They lined another wall with floor to ceiling roughly finished BC fir, which inhibited sound echo.

On February 28, 1969 George Harrison visited the Le Hibou where he saw The Modern Rock Quartet perform. George was staying at the Chateau Laurier and was in Ottawa primarily to determine whether Apple records should sign American Folk Singer Eric Anderson whom he saw perform at the Capitol Theatre.

Another important contributor to the support of Le Hibou was the Canada Council for the Arts, which subsidized the seminal poetry reading series of Canadian poets. This programme was masterminded by poet Harry Howith, a Le Hibou founding member. Lineups were blocks long, but the then Sussex Drive venue could only hold about 60 people.

Le Hibou relied primarily on admission charges to cover the costs of the theatre, comedy and music programmes, although some presentations were sponsored by the CBC (radio and television) - especially for local jazz groups. Posters advertising events were in themselves works of art - created by local established graphic artists at no charge. The famous owl logo was created by Frank Mayers. Other poster ads were frequently created by artists Chris Wells, the Rosewarns, David Sutherland, Georges de Niverville, James Boyd and Dennis Pike. Le Hibou served food during the day and, for after hours jazz programmes, both food and alcohol. Many Canadian and international folk, blues and jazz artists, anglophone and francophone, developed their reputations through appearances at Le Hibou. Actor Dan Aykroyd, a regular at Le Hibou, said he jammed with Muddy Waters before he moved to New York City as an original cast member of the TV program Saturday Night Live.

Le Hibou closed in 1975.
