= Ian Tamblyn =

Ian Tamblyn OC
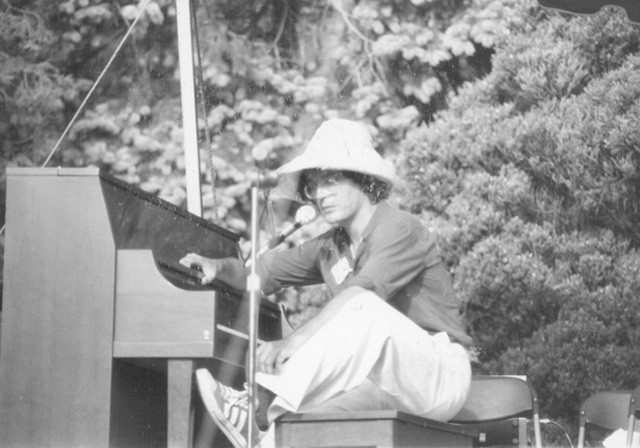

Background information
- Born: December 2, 1947 (age 78); Fort William, Ontario
- Genres: Folk; New-age
- Occupations: Musician producer playwright adventurer & guide
- Instruments: Vocals guitar piano hammered dulcimer synthesizer
- Years active: 1971–Present

Ian Tamblyn OC (born December 2, 1947) is a Canadian folk music singer-songwriter and record producer, adventurer and playwright.

== Early life ==
Tamblyn was born and raised in Fort William (now Thunder Bay), Ontario, and studied at Trent University. He graduated in 1971 and subsequently settling in Chelsea, Quebec.

== Career ==
Tamblyn released a demo cassette, Moose Tracks, in 1971. In 1976, he released his first full-length album, Ian Tamblyn, which won a Juno Award for Best Album Cover that year. Since then, he has completed over 25 recording projects. He plays guitar, piano, hammered dulcimer and synthesizer, as well as singing.

Tamblyn has recorded a number of instrumental music albums inspired by his adventure travels to remote places such as the north shore of Lake Superior, the Nahanni River and the Chukchi Sea, and his participation in scientific research expeditions to locations such as Greenland and Antarctica. Magnetic North and Antarctica incorporate on-location field recordings into the music. Magnetic North was nominated for a Juno Award for Best Instrumental Album of 1990. Over My Head was recorded in-studio after a live concert commissioned by the Canadian Museum of Nature, in which music was blended with tape-looped field recordings of birds.

In 1999, Tamblyn composed the background music for the first season of the Canadian animated TV series Toad Patrol. He entertained on the main stage at the Peterborough Folk Festival in 2001.

In 2008, with Bruce Cockburn and other Canadian folk artists, he released Dancing Alone, a two-CD tribute album of the songs of the influential Canadian songwriter and poet William Hawkins. He also produced the majority of the tracks on the album.

Tamblyn won a Canadian Folk Music Award in 2010.

Ian Tamblyn joined the Ottawa Grassroots Festival as artistic director in 2021 and currently remains in this position.

In December 2021, Tamblyn was appointed an Officer of the Order of Canada for his enduring contributions as a folk music icon, adventurer and cultural ambassador for Canada.

== Partial discography ==
- Moose Tracks (1971)
- Ian Tamblyn (1976) – Juno Award, Best Album Cover
- Closer to Home (1978)
- When Will I See You Again (1980)
- Dance Me Outside (1983)
- Over My Head (1986)
- Ghost Parade (1988)
- Magnetic North (1990)
- Through the Years ('76–'92) (1992, compilation)
- Days of Sun and Wind
- Antarctica (1994)
- The Middle Distance (1995)
- Lost Visions, Forgotten Dreams (1996)
- The Body Needs to Travel (1997)
- Voice in the Wilderness (2001)
- Like the Way You're Tinkin (2002)
- Angel's Share (2004)
- Machine Works (2005)
- Coastline Of Our Dreams – The Songs Of Ian Tamblyn (performed by various artists) (2005)
- Superior: Spirit and Light – The Four Coast Project: Vol.1 (2007)
- Raincoast – The Four Coast Project: Vol.2 (2008)
- Gyre (2009)
- Willisville Mountain (2009)
- In Dreams Behold (2010)
- Walking The Bones – The Four Coast Project: Vol.3 (2011)
- Frog's Night Out – a children's album... sort of (2013)
- Epic Rock CD (2013)
- Side By Each (2013)
- The Labrador – The Four Coast Project: Vol. 4 (2014)
- Walking In The Footsteps – Celebrating the Group of 7 (2015)

== Selected plays ==
- Dream Children (1976)
- Northern Affairs (1984)
- Somebody Get Me a Job (1987)
- Legends of the Northern Swamp (1990)
- Land of Trash (1991)
- Day in the Night of Zephyr Fallutyn (1995)
