= Mike Evin =

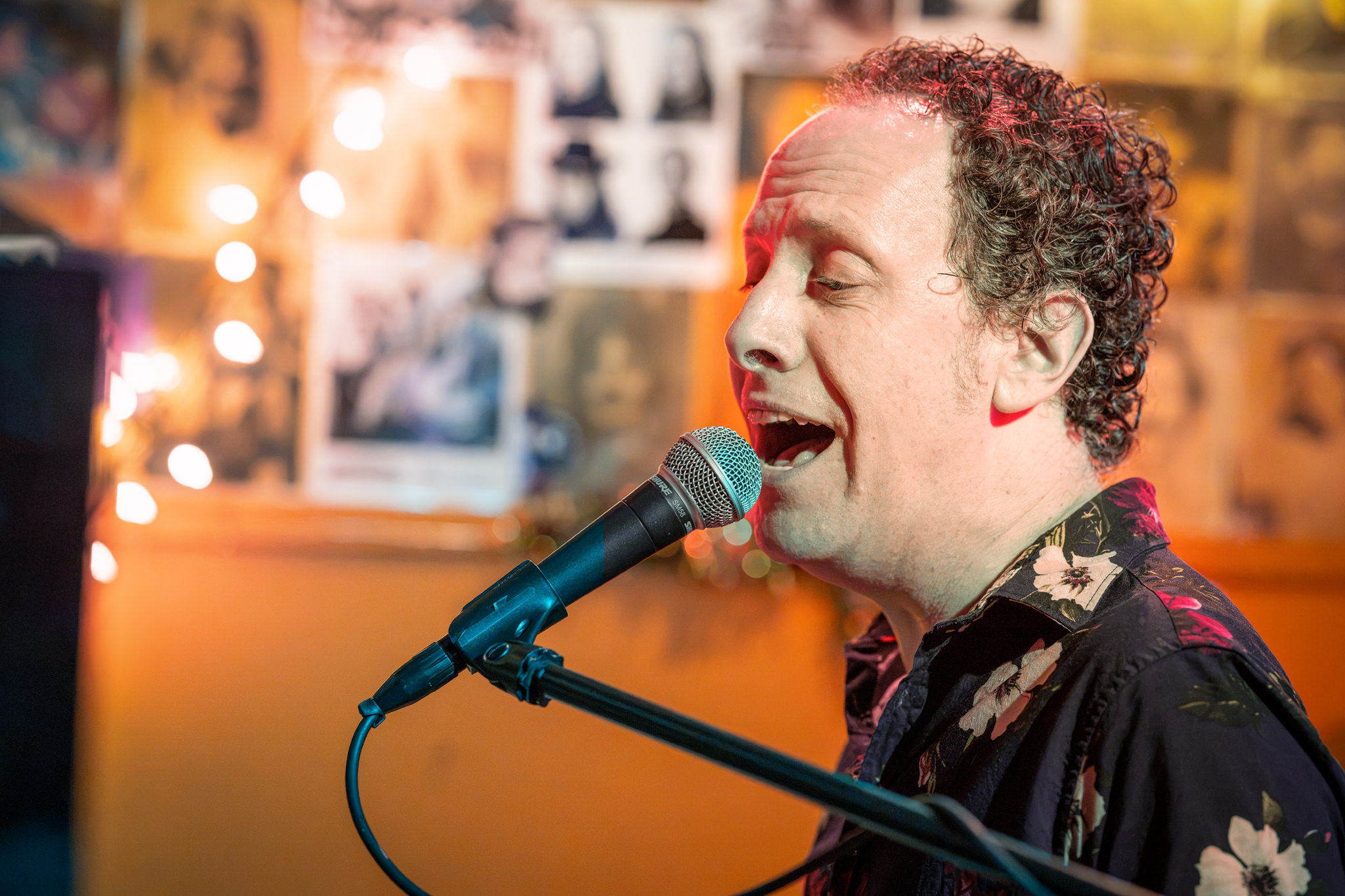

Background information
- Origin: Montreal, Quebec, Canada
- Occupations: Singer-songwriter, musician
- Instruments: Piano, keyboards, guitar, singing
- Years active: 2001–present
- Website: www.mikeevin.com

Mike Evin is a Canadian singer-songwriter based out of Toronto, Ontario. He has relocated to several cities, including his original hometown of Montreal, and Halifax. Evin's primary instruments are the piano and keyboard, though also plays guitar and other instruments.

Evin has released six albums and two EPs since 2001. His second album, I'll Bring The Stereo, was co-produced by Barenaked Ladies bassist Jim Creeggan, and his brother, former Barenaked Ladies keyboardist Andy Creeggan. Both play on the album, along with a host of notable Canadian musicians; Tyler Stewart and Kevin Hearn, also of Barenaked Ladies, Kurt Swinghammer, Dave Matheson, Gary Breit, and Ian McLauchlan, among others.

His subsequent albums and EPs have featured production from the acclaimed Don Kerr, Brad Jones, and Howie Beck. Evin also co-produced his third album, Good Watermelon with recording engineer Paul Forgues.

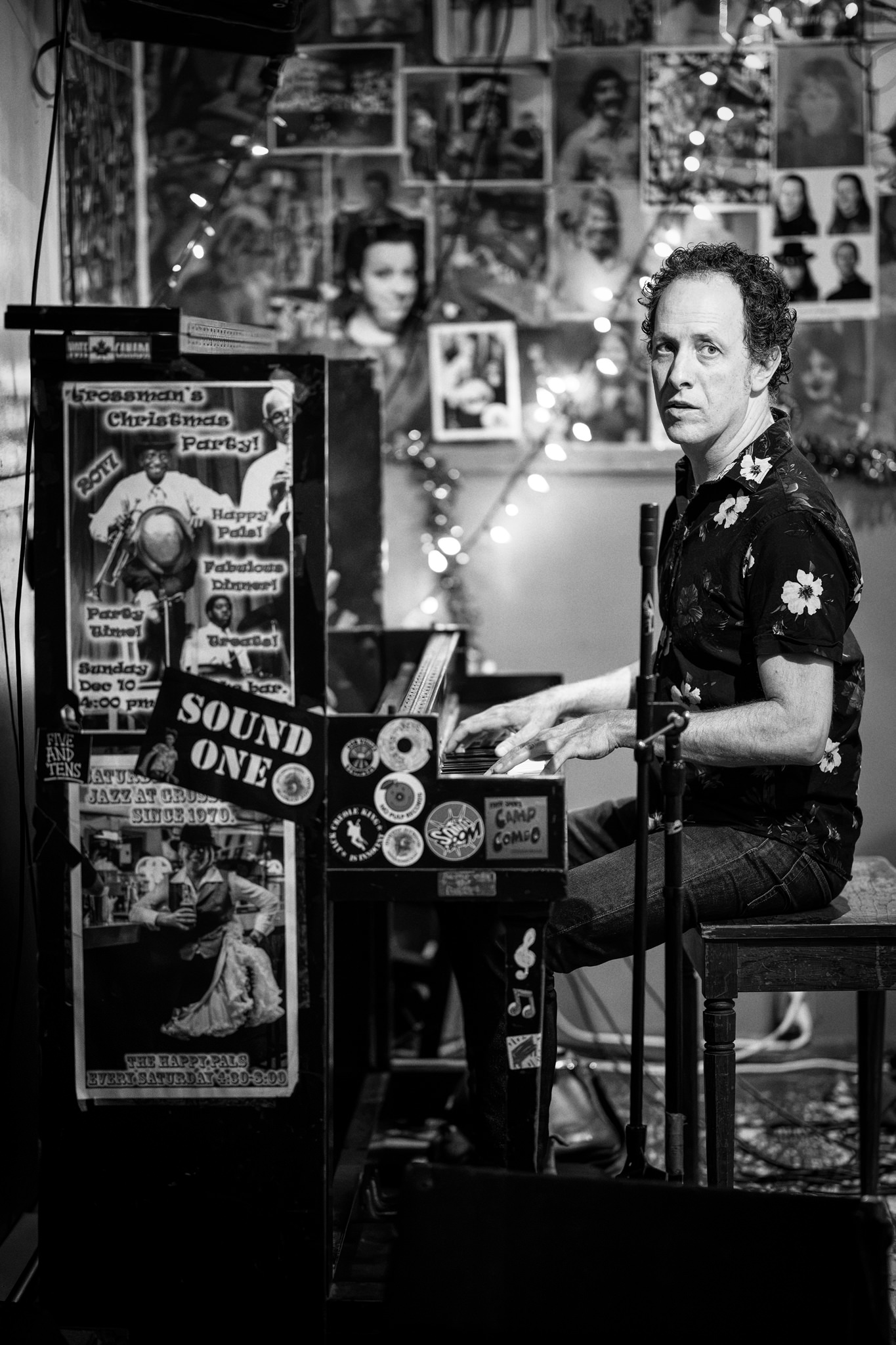
Grossman’s Tavern (Toronto, July 2026)

Evin has performed live both solo, and with numerous combinations of backing musicians. In the mid-to-late-2000s, Evin toured with his own piano – a small 64-key upright he named "Beatrice".

In February 2009, he was invited as an artist on the Barenaked Ladies' cruise, Ships and Dip V. He performed several shows backed by the Creeggan brothers, and Tyler Stewart. He was invited back for a second time on the following cruise (dubbed Ships and Dip 4) in February 2011.

== Discography ==
- The January Muse (2001)
- I'll Bring The Stereo (2005)
- Let's Slow It Down (E.P.) (2007)
- Good Watermelon (2009)
- Do You Feel The World? (2011)
- Life As A Lover (2015)
- With Love From Cuba (E.P.) (2015)
- Evin on Earth (2019)
