= David Wiffen =

English-Canadian folk musician (1942–2026)

- Born: 11 March 1942; Redhill, Surrey, England
- Died: 5 April 2026 (aged 84) Ottawa, Ontario, Canada
- Genres: Folk
- Occupations: Singer, songwriter
- Instruments: Vocals, guitar
- Years active: 1958–1980s; 1993–1999
- Labels: Universal International; Fantasy; United Artists; True North

David Wiffen (11 March 1942 – 5 April 2026) was an English-Canadian folk singer-songwriter. Two of his songs, "Driving Wheel" and "More Often Than Not", have become cover standards.

== Early life ==
Wiffen was born in Redhill, Surrey, England. He spent his early childhood with his mother, living on an aunt's farm in Chipstead, while his father, an engineer, contributed to the war effort. Following the war, Wiffen's family relocated to London and, in 1954, to Claygate, Surrey, where Wiffen attended Hinchley Wood School. Wiffen came to Canada at the age of 16.

== Career ==
Wiffen first sang with the Kingston upon Thames-based Black Cat Skiffle group. After his family's relocation to Canada, he became part of the burgeoning folk music scene, initially in Toronto. Wiffen sang at the Depression in Calgary the summer of 1962.In 1964, Wiffen hitchhiked to Edmonton and later managed The Depression folk club in Calgary.

In 1965, having moved to Vancouver, Wiffen was invited to perform at The Bunkhouse club on a live ensemble album. It became Wiffen's first solo album, David Wiffen at the Bunkhouse Coffeehouse, Vancouver BC, on the Universal International label, when the other invited musicians failed to show up.

He was subsequently in several bands, including The Pacers, based in Prince George, British Columbia, where he was the lead vocalist, and The Children, based in Ottawa. Members of The Children included William Hawkins, Bruce Cockburn, Sneezy Waters and Richard Patterson. He subsequently joined 3's a Crowd, whose initial members included Brent Titcomb, Donna Warner, Trevor Veitch and Richard Patterson. Wiffen also cohosted a television variety series on Ottawa station CJOH with Ann Mortifee, which was produced for a period by William Hawkins.

Wiffen subsequently signed to Fantasy Records as a solo artist. In 1971, he released David Wiffen, and had hit singles with "One Step" and "More Often Than Not". The album also contained his most widely covered song, "Driving Wheel". By this time a number of his songs had been recorded by other musicians, including Harry Belafonte, Anne Murray and Tom Rush.

His second solo studio album, Coast to Coast Fever (United Artists, 1973), was produced by Bruce Cockburn, and Wiffen's musical career appeared to be quite promising. He continued to perform regularly in the 1970s, though found his success diminishing and a consequent source of frustration and depression, compared to the success of contemporaries Bruce Cockburn and Murray McLauchlan. Alcohol abuse compounded the difficulties he was experiencing in his musical career. He eventually ceased performing, choosing to become a limousine driver and later a publicly funded driver for handicapped persons in Ottawa. Wiffen suffered a serious back injury at that job while moving a wheelchair, which required corrective surgery and impeded any return to performing.

Wiffen's third album, South of Somewhere, was released in 1999, 26 years after Coast to Coast Fever. At that time, Wiffen had been sober for ten years and had spent six years in preparation and development for the album's production. The album contained a mix of reworkings of some of his older material, such as "Driving Wheel", plus some new songs. During this period, he returned briefly to performing, principally as a weekly performer and performance host at Irene's Pub in Ottawa, Ontario, but then stopped performing publicly. As of 2008 and through much of 2009, Wiffen was on EMI's list of "missing royaltors".

In 2015, Songs From the Lost and Found, was released, containing material written and recorded between 1973 and the early 1980s, in the years after the release of Wiffen's Coast to Coast Fever album. The master tapes were thought lost for many years, but surfaced among the effects of former bandmate Richard Patterson, who died in 2011. In 2024, a compilation of these recordings appeared as Timeless Songs.

== Death ==
Wiffen died at a hospice in Ottawa, Ontario, on 5 April 2026, at the age of 84.

== Discography ==
=== Albums ===
- David Wiffen at the Bunkhouse Coffeehouse, Vancouver BC (Universal International, 1965; CD reissue via Mousehole Music, 2021)
- David Wiffen (Fantasy, 1971; expanded CD reissue via Water, 2014)
- Coast to Coast Fever (United Artists, 1973; CD reissue via EMI Music Canada, 1994)
- South of Somewhere (True North, 1999)
- Songs from the Lost and Found (True North, 2015)
- Timeless Songs: Unreleased Stage & Studio Recordings 1974/93 (New Shot Records, 2024)

=== Appearances ===
- Christopher's Movie Matinée - 3's a Crowd (ABC Dunhill, 1968). Wiffen was a band member, and his song "Don't Want To Drive You Away" is included.
- Camp Fortune 1974 - David Wiffen / Tex Lecor (Radio Canada International RM 226, 1974) - A CBC transcription recording including five live recordings from David Wiffen (reissued in 2024 on Timeless Songs).
- Touch the Earth - Various Artists (CBC LM 473, 1981) - Compilation of songs mostly originally broadcast on CBC's "Touch The Earth" program in the 1970s. Includes "Cool Green River" by David Wiffen.

== Covers ==
"Driving Wheel (Lost My Driving Wheel)" was covered by Tom Rush on his 1970 self-titled album, Roger McGuinn in 1973 on his self-titled first solo album. It was also recorded by Greg Harris (1982). The Cowboy Junkies released several versions. Matt Minglewood (Drivin' Wheel 1999), The Jayhawks (Live From The Women's Club, Vol. 1 2002), Ray Wylie Hubbard (Rounder/Philo, 2005), Chris and Rich Robinson of the Black Crowes (Brothers of a Feather: Live at the Roxy 2007), the Chris Robinson Brotherhood during live performances throughout 2011 & 2012, and by British singer-songwriter Rumer, who recorded it for a BBC live session in 2011.

"More Often Than Not" has been covered by Jerry Jeff Walker in 1970 on his Bein' Free album, Ian & Sylvia (1971), and Eric Andersen on his 1972 Blue River album.

"Mr. Wiffen (Is Incommunicado Today)" has been covered by Harry Belafonte on his 1973 album Play Me.

"Skybound Station", from Coast to Coast Fever, has been covered by Blackie and the Rodeo Kings on their Kings of Love album (1999).

"Lucifer's Blues", from Coast to Coast Fever, has been covered by members of the Skydiggers and the Cowboy Junkies in their side project band, Lee Harvey Osmond, developed by Tom Wilson of Blackie and the Rodeo Kings and Junkhouse.

"I Don't Want To Drive You Away" was covered by Anne Murray, as "David's Song".

"Smoke Rings" was covered by Hiss Golden Messenger on a Parallelogram LP also featuring Michael Chapman (singer) by Three Lobed Recordings released in December 2015.
