= Brent Titcomb =

Canadian actor and musician

- Born: Brent Arthur Titcomb; August 10, 1940 (age 86); Vancouver, British Columbia, Canada
- Occupations: Actor, musician
- Years active: 1965–present

Brent Arthur Titcomb (born August 10, 1940) is a Canadian actor and musician. He plays guitar, percussion, harmonica, and jaw harp.

== Music career ==
Titcomb was the original member of the folk-rock group 3's A Crowd. They began in 1965, in Vancouver, and later moved to Toronto. They played coffeehouses and festivals. In concert, he was the comic of the group where he used an odd-sounding vacuum cleaner as part of the routine. They released an album titled Christopher's Movie Matinee, with the help of Cass Elliott.

In 1968, Titcomb went solo and toured Canada and parts of Europe. His songs were recorded by Anne Murray, Andy Williams, Glen Campbell, and The Osmond Brothers. He was a member of Murray's touring band. He performed with the Edmonton Symphony Orchestra.

Starting in 1976, Titcomb became a mainstay performer at Festival of Friends in Hamilton, Ontario. Over the years, he has appeared there twenty five times and has headlined the event a record five times. He also appeared at the New Orleans World's Fair and in Mexico in 1981. Titcomb became involved in environmental and human rights causes. He sang before the Dalai Lama during one of the religious leader's rare Toronto visits. He also played at the Jacques Cousteau Festival in Hamilton.

In 1980, he released the album Time Traveler, which gained attention as far away as Australia. In 1993, he released a greatest hits CD titled Healing Of Her Heart. In 2001, he released Beyond Appearances. These two CDs have different versions of his song Tibetan Bells. He did Tibetan throat singing in both versions. In many of his songs, he used his own unique musical language. He also performed the songs of Bob Carpenter and Ian Tamblyn.

In 2009, he joined the folk rock group Lee Harvey Osmond, with Tom Wilson as frontman. He is on two of the group's CDs.

== Other work ==
For one season, he hosted The Brent Titcomb Show on CBC television. The program featured fellow folk singers. He also did voice-over work in animated films and videos, including The Care Bears Movie and Clifford's Fun with.... He wrote several radio jingles and appeared in TV commercials for Casino Rama, Contact C, Tim Horton's, and Canadian Tire.

== Personal life ==
He is married to artist Cheryl Russell. They lived in Toronto for several years. In 2014, he moved to Vancouver, to help care for his father. He stayed until his father died in February 2016. He now lives in Stratford, Ontario. His son is musician and actor Liam Titcomb.

== Awards ==
Titcomb appeared in an ad for Canadian Tire, which won an award. He also appeared on a Canadian postage stamp which honoured Canadian Tire's 75th anniversary. In 2013, he was honoured at Winterfolk, in Toronto.

== Discography ==
This section contains only solo work. See also discographies of 3's a Crowd and Lee Harvey Osmond. This discography is probably incomplete.

- May All Beings Be Happy (1977)
- Time Traveler (1980)
- Healing Of Her Heart (1993) (greatest hits)
- Beyond Appearances (2001)
