= Sneezy Waters =

Canadian singer

- Born: Peter Hodgson; March 1, 1945 (age 81); Ottawa, Ontario, Canada
- Occupations: Singer, songwriter, actor
- Instrument: Guitar

Sneezy Waters (born Peter Hodgson; March 1, 1945) is a Canadian folk musician, singer, songwriter and actor who is perhaps best known for his portrayal of Hank Williams Sr. in the play and film Hank Williams: The Show He Never Gave. He also works as a stagehand at the National Arts Centre in his home town of Ottawa, Ontario.

== Biography ==
He began performing in Ottawa coffeehouses in his late teens and was a member of several local rock bands, including The Children (which included Bruce Cockburn) and A Rosewood Daydream, appearing with the latter at Expo '70, in Osaka, Japan. Taking the stage name Sneezy Waters he performed during the 1970s as a street musician in Ottawa and appeared as a soloist and with his Excellent Band at folk festivals and nightclubs elsewhere in the country. Sneezy has toured extensively in Canada (including several Arctic communities), Japan, Hong Kong, Laos, Thailand, India, Denmark, Germany, the Netherlands, and the United States. He cites influences as far flung as Woody Guthrie, Frank Zappa, Philip Glass, Tom Waits, Bob Dylan, Lester Young, Charlie Parker, John Lennon, and Willie P. Bennett.

From 1977 to 1990, he assumed the role of Hank Williams in the runaway hit Hank Williams: The Show He Never Gave. The play portrays an 'imaginary concert' that the legendary US country singer might have given New Year's Eve 1952 in Canton, Ohio, had he not died en route. It was premiered in November 1977 at the Beacon Arms Hotel, Ottawa, and then presented on tour throughout Canada and in the USA until 1982. It was also staged at the O Kanada cultural exhibition in Berlin in 1983. Waters gave some 300 stage performances as Williams, and also appeared in the film adaptation of the show, a made-for-Canadian-TV-movie that first aired 31 December 1980. The show toured throughout Canada and the United States, and was part of O Kanada, a Canadian cultural festival in Berlin. The movie version of the play garnered rave reviews. In 1984. Waters received the Best Actor Award in the 3rd Festival International du Film Musical in Grenoble, France, for his role as Hank Williams. The film was also nominated for the best country motion picture in the 19th Annual Academy of Country Music Awards.

He has been featured on many network radio and television shows including This Country in the Morning, The Entertainers, Variety Tonight, Let's Sing Out, The Family Brown Show, Café Hibou, Canada After Dark, The Bob McLean Show, Sharon, Lois & Bram's Elephant Show, Ninety Minutes Live, The Alan Thicke Show, The Tommy Hunter Show, The Twilight Zone ("Love Is Blind") and Super Country Superstars.

He has shared the stage with a number of musicians, including Joan Armatrading, John Hammond Jr., Roy Orbison, and Martin Mull. He performed a number of concerts with fiddler Zeke Mazurek in Mt. Tabor.

Sneezy Waters was inducted into the Ottawa Valley Country Music Hall Of Fame in 1997.

== Discography ==
- 1975 Sneezy Waters, Robert Armes, Bent Stump String Band, John Allison (CBC Radio Canada – LM 423) (features four Sneezy recordings)
- 1978 You've Got Sawdust on the Floor of Your Heart (Sneezy Waters Records – SW5)
- 1981 Sneezy Waters Sings Hank Williams (Sawdust Records - SW6) (1999 CD release: Borealis Records BCD122)
- 1997 A Letter Home (Watershed Music – WM5)
- 2011 Sneezy Waters (sneezywaters.com)
- 2017 Sneezy Waters And His Very Fine Band LIVE (sneezywaters.com)
