= Collectibles Vol 1 =

Collectibles

Compilation album by Willie P Bennett
- Released: 1991
- Genre: Country music
- Label: Dark Light Records

Willie P Bennett chronology
The Lucky Ones (1985)	Collectibles (1991)	Take My Own Advice (1993)

Collectibles is a compilation album released by Canadian singer-songwriter Willie P. Bennett. Originally released in 1991 by Dark Light Records (who also released Bennett's album Take My Own Advice), on cassette and compact disc, it was re-released with a new cover and the title Collectibles Vol. 1 in 1996.

Bennett chose to release this "best of" collection with songs from his first three albums because these albums were, at the time, long out of print and had never been available on CD. The tracks were digitally remastered from analog by Peter Moore.

== Track listing ==
1. "You"
2. "Lace and Pretty Flowers"
3. "Come on Train"
4. "Willie's Diamond Joe"
5. "Blackie and the Rodeo King"
6. "If You Have to Choose"
7. "Me and Molly"
8. "Summer Dreams Winter Sleep"
9. "Storm Clouds"
10. "Country Squall"
11. "My Pie"
12. "Music in Your Eyes"
13. "Down to the Water"
14. "Hobo's Taunt"
15. "Pens and Paper"

All words and music by Willie P. Bennett.

Tracks 4, 7, 10, 11, 12, 13 from Tryin' to Start Out Clean, originally released in 1975.

Tracks 1, 2, 3, 6, 9 14 from Hobo's Taunt, originally released in 1977.

Tracks 5, 8, 15 from Blackie and the Rodeo King, originally released in 1978.
