= Heartstrings (Willie P. Bennett album) =

Studio album by Willie P. Bennett
- Released: 1998
- Studio: The Recording Service, Toronto, Ontario, Canada
- Genre: Country music
- Label: Bnatural Records
- Producer: Tony Quarrington

Willie P. Bennett chronology
Take My Own Advice (1993)	Heartstrings (1998)

Professional ratings
Review scores
Source	Rating
AllMusic	4.5/5 stars

Heartstrings was the seventh and final solo album released by Canadian singer-songwriter Willie P. Bennett and was released on CD by Bennett's own Bnatural Records in 1998 (Bnatural 0998).

The album was something of a departure for Bennett from his earlier solo work. Reflecting his many years spent playing mandolin in Fred Eaglesmith's band, the songs were mostly written and performed by Bennett on mandolin and harmonica, instead of guitar. The musical territory covered on this album is broader than earlier works. In addition to folk, country, bluegrass and blues, Bennett also incorporates elements of klezmer, gospel and classical.

Willie's first ever music video was filmed for the song "Blue Valentine" featuring Keith Glass and Russell deCarle (of Prairie Oyster). The video was produced by Sean Danby and shot in Golden, British Columbia.

The album won a 1999 Juno Award for "best solo roots and traditional album".

== Track listing ==
1. Sunset Pendulum (Music & lyrics by WPB)

- WPB - mandolin & vocals
- Tony Trischka - banjo
- Tony Quarrington - guitar

2. High Park Feeders (Music & lyrics by WPB)

- WPB - mandolin, harmonica & vocal
- David Wilcox - acoustic guitar
- Jeff Bird - double bass

3. One Vessel (Music & lyrics by WPB)

- WPB - guitar, harmonica & vocal
- Daisy DeBolt - harmony vocal
- Ken Whitely - mandolin
- Jeff Bird - jaw harp
- Ed Hutchison - udu

4. Waltz Time Medley: Will cheats 'em (WPB); Waltz Time (WPB); Devil's Dream 3/4 (Trad. arr. WPB); Devil's Dream 4/4 (Trad. arr. WPB); Big John McNeil (Trad. arr. WPB)

- WPB - mandolin, harmonica & vocal
- Amos Garrett - acoustic archtop guitar

5. (Who's Gonna Get The) Last Word (In) (Music & lyrics by WPB)

- WPB - mandolin & vocal
- Bruce Cockburn - acoustic guitar & harmony vocals
- Paul Bailie - percussion

6. Happy On The Moon (Music & lyrics by WPB)

- WPB - guitar, harmonica & vocal
- Amos Garrett - acoustic archtop guitar

7. Restless Wind (Music & lyrics by WPB)

- WPB - mandolin & vocal
- Vladimir Gorodkine - cymbalon
- Tony Quarington - guitar & mandolin
- Michelle Josef - percussion
- Tannis Slimmon - harmony Vocal
- Jeff Bird - sleigh bells

8. Blue Valentine (Music & lyrics by WPB)

- WPB - guitar, harmonica & Vocal
- Prairie Oyster, aka:
  - Russell DeCarle - bass & harmony vocals
  - Keith Glass - lead acoustic guitar & harmony vocal
  - Joan Bessen - wurlitzer piano & harmony vocal
  - John P. Allen - fiddle
- Michelle Josef - tambourine

9. Azure (Music & lyrics by WPB)

- WPB - mandolin
- Rodeo String Quartet, aka:
  - Sandy Baron - first violin
  - Liz Johnston - second violin
  - Nancy Kersaw - viola
  - Zoltan Rozsnyai - cello
- Paul Bailie - percussion

10. Billy And Jenny (Music & lyrics by WPB)

- WPB - guitar & vocals
- Melanie Doane - fiddle & harmony vocal

11. Brave Wings (Music & lyrics by WPB & Stephen Fearing)

- WPB - harmonica & vocal
- Stephen Fearing - guitar & harmony vocal

12. Caney Fork River (Music & lyrics by WPB)

- WPB - guitar & vocal
- Ken Whiteley - mandolin & 12 string slide guitar
- Jeff Bird - jaw harp

13. Dismantled Angel (Music & lyrics by WPB)

- WPB - guitar & vocal
- Scott Merritt - acoustic organ, tambourine & untuned autoharp
- Tannis Slimmon - harmony Vocal

14. Heartstrings (Music & lyrics by Tony Quarrington)

- WPB - vocal
- 206 Strings, aka:
  - Tony Quarrington - guitar, tenor banjo & 2nd dobro
  - Graham Townsend - fiddle
  - Ken Whiteley - mandolin & mandocello
  - Paul Bailie - percussion
  - Vladimir Gorodkine - cymbalon
  - Michelle Joseph - tambourine
  - Bruce Cockburn - guitar
  - Rodeo String Quartet, aka
    - Sandy Baron - first violin
    - Liz Johnston - second violin
    - Nancy Kersaw - viola
    - Zoltan Rozsnyai - cello
  - Rick Fielding - autoharp
  - Ed Hutchison - first dobro
  - Daisy Debolt - harmony vocals
  - Tannis Slimmon - harmony vocal
  - Jeff Bird - bowed psaltery
- Produced by Tony Quarrington
- Mainly recorded & entirely mixed by Ed Hutchison at The Recording Service, Toronto, Ontario
- Additional recording by:
  - (11,13) Scott Merritt at The Cottage, Guelph, Ontario
  - (15) Tanis Slimmon at The Emporium, Guelph, Ontario
  - (6) Dwain Sands at The Loft, Black Diamond, Alberta
  - (1) The folks at Current Sounds, New York City, New York
  - (8) Joan Bessen & Mike Poole at Kleenex Box Head Studios, Nashville, Tennessee
