= Bob Lanois =

Canadian musician (1948–2021)

- Born: Robert Jacques Lanois; April 4, 1948; Gatineau, Quebec, Canada
- Died: April 19, 2021 (aged 73) Hamilton, Ontario, Canada
- Genres: Ambient; folk
- Occupations: Musician; producer
- Instrument: Harmonica
- Label: Cordova Bay

Robert Jacques Lanois (April 4, 1948 – April 19, 2021) was a Canadian sound engineer, record producer, and harmonica player. He released his first album, Snake Road, in 2006, in collaboration with his brother Daniel Lanois. He also recorded an album with guitarist Tom Wilson, entitled The Shack Recordings Volume One.

In 1976, he and Daniel opened Grant Avenue Studio in Hamilton, Ontario, Canada, having previously worked out of their mother’s basement under the name MSR Productions.in the early 2000s, he opened his own studio, “The Shack”, in Waterdown, Ontario.

Among other credits, he co-produced Simply Saucer's demo tape with Daniel. He was also given a credit in the "Thanks to" section of U2's The Joshua Tree album credits.

Bob Lanois travelled to Sweden in 2007, performing shows together with eclectic Swedish band Big Is Less after having met the band's guitarist Tommy Sahlin via MySpace. In 2008, Lanois, as producer, teamed up with Mass Conception (a Canadian indie band) which resulted in the release of a six-song EP entitled No Pun Intended.

He died on April 19, 2021.

== Discography ==
- 2005 The Shack Recordings Volume One with Tom Wilson
- 2006 Snake Road (Cordova Bay)

=== Sound engineer ===
- 1977 Adult Entertainment, Raffi
- 1979 Denis LePage & Station Road, Denis Lepage
- 1977 Hobo's Taunt - Willie P. Bennett (engineered, with Daniel Lanois)
- 1979 Blackie and the Rodeo King - Willie P. Bennett (recording engineer; mixing engineer, with David Essig)

=== As musician ===
- 1971 Jacqueline & Lindsay

=== As photographer ===
- 2015 Oxide (Ion Bon)
