= Posterity Records =

Posterity Records was a Canadian record label established by Harvey Glatt, that was started in 1963 and existed, in corporate form, from 1975 to 1981.

== History ==
Harvey Glatt, an Ottawa-based music manager, promoter, retailer and radio station owner, formally established Posterity Records in 1976, following a 1963 release, under the Posterity label, of a record by Canadian poet Irving Layton. During its approximate six-year existence in the 1970s and early 1980s, the label released records by Lenny Breau, the Downchild Blues Band, Ian Tamblyn, and others. It was distributed by Glatt-owned TCD Records and Tapes, short for "Treble Clef Distribution". During this period, the label also distributed, as Posterity-Woodshed, records produced by Woodshed Records, a private label owned by Canadian singer-songwriter and producer David Essig. Included in Posterity-Woodshed releases was the seminal album, Blackie and the Rodeo King, by Willie P. Bennett, released in 1978. Posterity Records ceased issuing new releases in 1981 and assigned its distribution rights to Phonodisc Limited, at the time Canada's largest independent manufacturer and distributor of records and tapes. The Posterity-Woodshed label continued to issue new releases until Posterity Records completely ceased operations in 1984. Woodshed Records was thereafter reestablished by David Essig as a separate entity.

Posterity Records' first release was a recording of poet Irving Layton reading at Le Hibou Coffee House in 1963, produced by William Hawkins, with liner notes by Roy MacSkimming. Layton was reading from his book A Red Carpet From The Sun.

== Album releases ==
=== Posterity ===
- 1981 Joe Hall & The Continental Drift Rancho Banano
- 1980 Figgy Duff Figgy Duff
- 1979 Nighthawks Side Pocket Shot
- 1979 Noel Harrison Mount Hanley Song
- 1979 Lenny Breau Five O'Clock Bells
- 1979 Heaven's Radio Uptown Babies
- 1979 Roddy Ellias A Night For Stars
- 1979 Quarrington/Worthy Quarrington/Worthy
- 1978 Ian Tamblyn Closer To Home
- 1978 Heaven's Radio Active
- 1978 Tony Quarrington The Anthony B. Quarrington Limitation Presents...Top Ten Written All Over It
- 1978 Cody A Tale Of Three Cities
- 1978 Joe Hall & The Continental Drift On The Avenue
- 1977 Downchild Blues Band So Far - A Collection Of Our Best
- 1976 Doug McArthur Sisteron
- 1976 Ian Tamblyn Ian Tamblyn
- 1963 Irving Layton Live at Le Hibou

=== Posterity-Woodshed ===
Sources:

- 1983 David Essig While Living The Good Years
- 1979 Bill Garrett Bill Garrett
- 1978 Humber Valley River Boys Bar Room Daze
- 1978 David Essig Sequence
- 1978 Willie P. Bennett Blackie and the Rodeo King
- 1977 Willie P. Bennett Hobo's Taunt
- 1977 Margaret Christl Jockey to the Fair
- 1976 Original Sloth Band Hustlin' & Bustlin'
- 1976 David Essig Stewart Crossing
- 1975 David Essig High Ground
- 1975 Willie P. Bennett Tryin' to Start Out Clean
- 1975 David Essig Redbird Country
