= Dusty (Fred Eaglesmith album) =

Studio album by Fred Eaglesmith
- Released: November 23, 2004
- Studio: The Cottage
- Genre: Alternative country
- Length: 46:25
- Label: A Major Label; Catalogue number FSE010
- Producer: Scott Merritt

Fred Eaglesmith albums chronology
| The Official Bootleg Series Volume 2: The Fred Eaglesmith Texas Weekend 2004 (2004) | Dusty (2004) | Milly's Cafe (2006) |

Dusty is the 12th studio album by Canadian alternative country singer-songwriter Fred Eaglesmith. It was produced by Scott Merritt, and released by A Major Label on November 23, 2004.

== Background ==
2004's Dusty marks Eaglesmith's reunion with producer Scott Merritt, who had helped shape Eaglesmith's breakthrough studio sound in the mid-90s.

== Track listing ==
All songs written by Fred Eaglesmith.

1. "Dusty" – 4:43
2. "Tunnel" – 3:44
3. "I 75" – 4:46
4. "Ship" – 4:36
5. "Rainbow" – 3:53
6. "Wichita" – 7:11
7. "Crowds" – 5:21
8. "Hey Baby" – 3:12
9. "Codeine" – 5:03
10. "Carne del Toro" – 3:29

== Personnel ==
- Fred Eaglesmith – vocals, wurlitzer funmaker
- Scott Merritt – gut string guitar, bass, hammond, glockenspiel, samples, wurlitzer, acoustic guitar, reed organ, drums, baritone guitar
- David Hetherington – cello
- Winonna Zelenka – cello
- Maurizio Baccante – cello
- Roman Borys – cello
- Paul Intson – bass on 1, 4, 7
- Peter Von Althon – drums on 1, 6, 9; percussion on 9, 10; tambourine on 6
- Matt Keighan – drums on 3, 4, 8
- Darcy Yates – bass on 5
- strings conducted by Dan Parr
- string arrangements by Dan Parr and Scott Merritt

== Reception ==
Of the album, Jason Schneider at Exclaim! said, "(it) immediately proves to be a radical departure, and a thoroughly welcome one. ... (A)im(ing) for classic Memphis blue-eyed soul(, i)t doesn't exactly achieve this goal. Instead, the album could be the equivalent of Bruce Springsteen's Nebraska if it had been recorded with ProTools. ... (I)n the process, (Eaglesmith) and Merritt created something entirely different, and like a newborn colt, beautiful in its own awkward way."

The reviewer at The Sydney Morning Herald gave Dusty a 4-star rating, saying, "It's neither country nor folk - it just is what it is. This is also as bleak as (Eaglesmith) has been. These stories rarely mention it directly, but they reek of a time where on top of the daily hassles of working, wanting and getting by is a patina of gnawing despair. It's a sorrow aimed at a world more fixed on anger, retribution and empty religious sentiments than offering hope."
