= Take My Own Advice =

Studio album by Willie P. Bennett
- Released: 1993
- Studio: MDI Studios, Toronto, Ontario
- Genre: Country music
- Label: Dark Light Records
- Producer: Peter J. Moore

Willie P. Bennett chronology
Collectibles Vol 1 (1991)	Take My Own Advice (1993)	Heartstrings (1998)

Take My Own Advice was the sixth album released by Canadian singer-songwriter Willie P. Bennett and was released on compact disc by Dark Light Records in 1993 (DL 12003), the same label that had previously issued his compilation album Collectibles.

The title track is a re-recording of a song from Bennett's 1979 album Blackie and the Rodeo King. It features both new songs and songs from the 1985 demo cassette The Lucky Ones.

== Track listing ==
1. "L.A.D.T. (Livin' in a Dirty Town)" (6:14)
2. "Jukebox" (3:14)
3. "(If I Could) Take My Own Advice" (3:06)
4. "Step Away" (4:59)
5. "You Care" (4:44)
6. "Sometimes It Comes So Easy" (4:18)
7. "Katie's Tune" (3:17)
8. "Breaking the Silence" (3:44)
9. "Blood Brother" (5:06)
10. "Push On" (4:39)
11. "Red Dress" (2:06)
12. "Why'd I Go Zydeco" (instrumental) (2:06)

All words and music by Willie P. Bennett, all songs published by Eiffel Dog Publishing.

== Personnel ==
- Willie P. Bennett – vocals, guitar
- Mike Holder - pedal steel
- Denis Pendrith - bass
- Ken Harrison - organ
- Ed White - drums
- Jeff Arsenault - drums ("Red Dress", "Zydeco", "Sometimes...", "Jukebox" and "Breaking the Silence")
- Colin Linden - acoustic, electric and slide guitar, dobro
- Colleen Peterson - harmony vocal

\technical

- Produced by Peter J. Moore
- Recorded by Simon Less with the MDI 24 track digital remote
- Mixed by Simon Less and Peter J. Moore (MDI studios, Toronto, Ontario)
- Mastered by Peter J. Moore with the sonic solutions at the "E" room, Toronto, Ontario
