= Goodbye, So Long, Hello =

Single by Prairie Oyster

from the album Different Kind of Fire
- B-side: "Different Kind of Fire"
- Released: February 1990
- Genre: Country
- Length: 3:07
- Label: RCA
- Songwriters: Willie P. Bennett; Russell deCarle
- Producer: Steve Berlin

Prairie Oyster singles chronology
"Play Me Some Honky Tonk Music" (1987)	"Goodbye, So Long, Hello" (1990)	"I Don't Hurt Anymore" (1990)

"Goodbye, So Long, Hello" is a song initially recorded by Willie P. Bennett on his 1989 album The Lucky Ones. It was written by Bennett and Prairie Oyster band member Russell deCarle.

The song became better known once recorded by Canadian country music group Prairie Oyster. It was released in February 1990 as the first single from their second studio album, Different Kind of Fire. It peaked at number 3 on the RPM Country Tracks chart in May 1990. Two different b-sides were used on different editions: a cover of the Willie P. Bennett song "Take My Own Advice", and the Joan Besen song "Different Kind of Fire". Both tracks also appear on the studio album. A double A-side promo version was also released.

== Chart performance ==
Chart (1990)	Peak position
Canada Country Singles (RPM)	3
US Hot Country Songs (Billboard)	62

=== Year-end charts ===
Chart (1990)	Position
Canada Country Tracks (RPM)	12
