= Zeke Mazurek =

David "Zeke" Mazurek (died October 30, 2010) was a Canadian fiddler based in Prince Edward County, Ontario who performed and recorded traditional and popular music across Canada with several musical groups.

== Career ==
In 1976 Mazurek performed as part of the band Prairie Oyster. In the 1980s he was a member of the folk group Stringband; in 1980 the group performed at the Vancouver Folk Festival. Mazurek continued to perform in southern Ontario throughout the 1980s and 1990s.

In 1999 Mazurek performed on violin and viola with the group Tsufit on their album Under the Mediterranean Sky. In 2000 he played fiddle on Aengus Finnan's album Fool's Gold. and in 2002 he played violin on Tom Savage's album Brand of Symphony.

Although he didn't tour with them, Mazurek's fiddle is heard on a number of recordings by the band Max Mouse and the Gorillas. He also performed a series of concerts in Mt. Tabor with Sneezy Waters.

Mazurek and fellow musicians Jeanette Arsenault and Bill Ostrander performed under the name "Fiddle and Frostbite". For a number of years the group organized an annual winter concert in Prince Edward County. The event, which was discontinued after Mazurek's death, revived in 2016, led by Paul Johnson.

Mazurek helped to develop "Fowke Tales", a theatrical production depicting this history of Douro Township. In 2009 he was featured on the CBC program, "Madly Off in All Directions".

When Mazurek became ill with cancer in 2010, musicians who had performed with him in the past, including members of the band Prairie Oyster, Sneezy Waters and singer Sylvia Tyson, performed in two concerts titled "ZekeFest" and "ZekeFest 2" to raise money for his family.

Mazurek died October 30, 2010. After his death, a concert celebrating Mazerek and his music raised $6000 for the Prince Edward County Memorial Hospital.

== Discography ==
- Zeke Gets a "D" for Love (featuring Zeke Mazurek & Alyssa Wright)
- This One's the Dreamer (Rick Fielding)
- Roll Me a Dream…
- I Aint Dead... YET
- Tryin' to Start Out Clean (Willie P. Bennett, 1975)
- Sneezy Waters – You've Got Sawdust On The Floor Of Your Heart
- Tim Harrison
- Air
- Thinking of Anna
- When The Bay Turns Blue (Rodney Brown)
- Tsufit Under the Mediterranean Sky
- Brand of Sympathy (Tom Savage)
- Fool's Gold (Aengus Finnan)
- Sara & the Sea (Tim Harrison)
- David the Bard: Zeke Mazurek Lost& Found (2010)
