= Dief Will Be the Chief Again =

Song by Stringband

"Dief Will Be the Chief Again" is a 1975 song by the Canadian folk band Stringband. A "tongue in jowl" tribute to former Canadian Prime Minister John Diefenbaker, the song was briefly popular in Canada when it premiered. Diefenbaker, who was often nicknamed "The Chief", initially expressed his delight at the tribute, but later cooled to the song.

== Genesis ==
In 1974, Stringband songwriter Bob Bossin was watching the Muhammad Ali–Joe Frazier title fight with Bob Rae, who would later become premier of Ontario. After Ali regained his title after a gap of many years by winning the bout, Rae commented that with Ali's victory, other events from the late Fifties and early Sixties could now recur: Floyd Patterson could now defeat Ali, Marilyn Bell could swim Lake Ontario again, and Diefenbaker could again be prime minister. Bossin was inspired to write the song.

According to Bossin in a CBC interview, the song, which he described as "very Canadian", is written from the viewpoint of someone with a complex character, and who mixes hope and nostalgia. The song's lyrics look nostalgically back at 1957, when Diefenbaker became prime minister, but in the chorus states that when Diefenbaker is Chief again, a dollar will be "worth a dollar again", an apparent reference to the devaluation of the Canadian dollar which cost Diefenbaker's Progressive Conservatives dearly in the 1962 election.

== Broadcast and reception ==
The band was broadcast performing the song on the CBC program As It Happens. The CBC was flooded with calls, and the next night, put on a segment about the response which included a phone interview with Diefenbaker, who was at home recovering from illness. The 79-year-old former prime minister stated "I must say that as a connoisseur of good music I was simply delighted ... It gave me quite a lift to listen to it." The song received some radio play, especially around Diefenbaker's hometown of Prince Albert, Saskatchewan, but did not become a hit. Bossin could find no label willing to publish the song, which was thought to have little interest in the United States.

Diefenbaker eventually cooled to the song. When Bossin's mother learned of Diefenbaker's changed attitude, she called her son, "Honey, I think he's on to us." In a final interview before his 1979 death, Diefenbaker stated that he had no comment about it. Bossin indicated that he had no idea why The Chief had come to have reservations about the song.

The song was included on The Indispensable Stringband 30th anniversary box set.
