= Grant Avenue Studio =

Recording studio in Hamilton, Ontario

Coordinates: 43.2512°N 79.8503°W

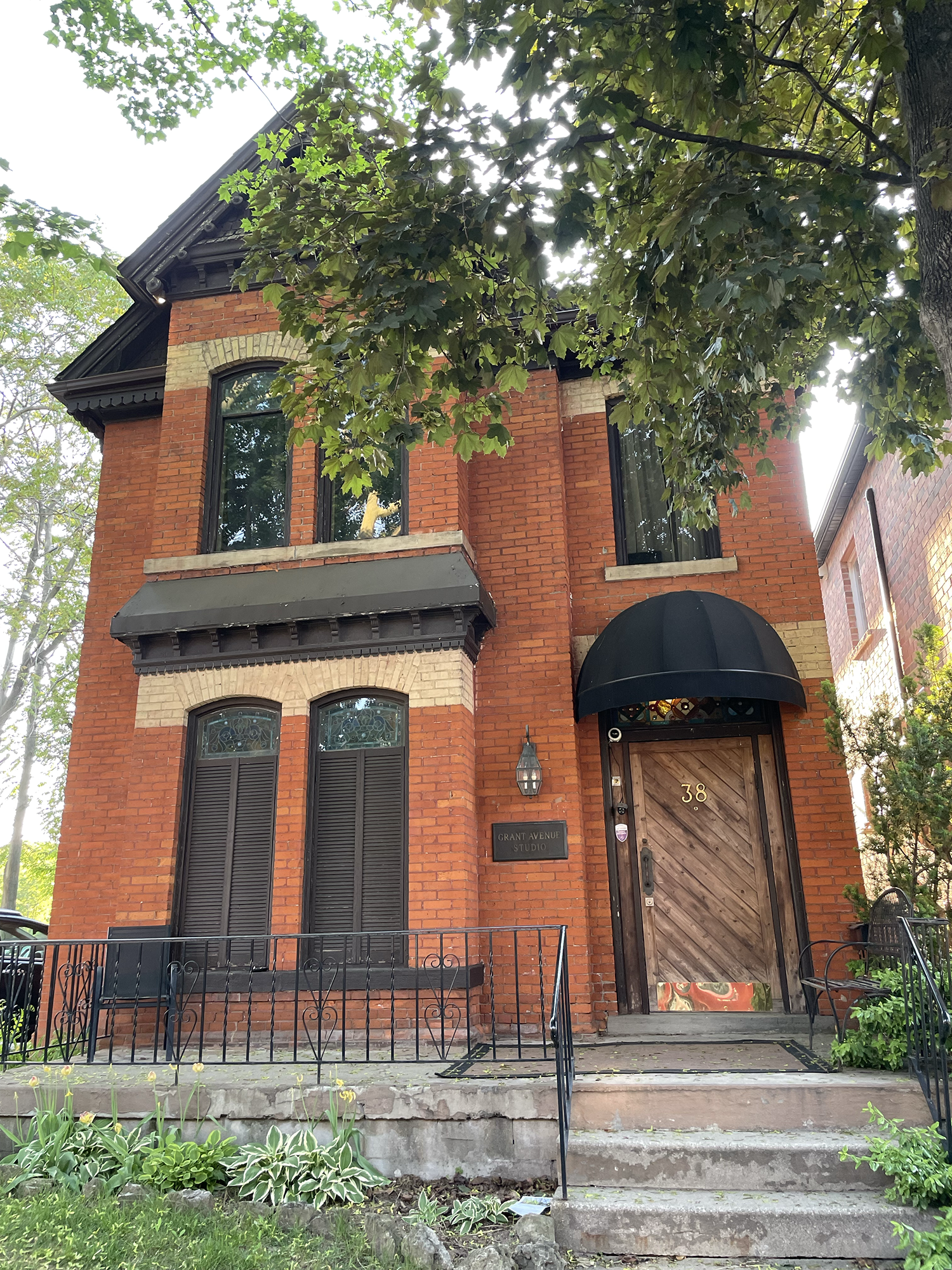
- Grant Avenue Studio in June 2023
- Company type: Recording studio
- Industry: Music
- Founded: 1976; 49 years ago
- Founders: Daniel Lanois; Bob Lanois
- Headquarters: Hamilton, Ontario, Canada
- Website: grantavenuestudio.com

Grant Avenue Studio is a music recording studio named after its location at 38 Grant Avenue in the city of Hamilton, Ontario, Canada. It was founded in 1976 by Canadian record producers and artists Bob Doidge, Daniel Lanois and Bob Lanois. The studio is known for its traditional look and intimate feel, which attracted artists such as Gordon Lightfoot, U2 and Johnny Cash.

== History ==
=== 1970s ===
In the early 1970s, music producers and brothers Bob and Daniel Lanois ran a makeshift music studio out of their mother's basement, located in Ancaster, Ontario. They purchased a building from the early 1900s in downtown Hamilton, Ontario and spent a year converting it into a proper studio opening for business in 1976. They named the studio after the street it was located on, Grant Avenue. Throughout the decade, the studio grew in popularity, with artists such as Gordon Lightfoot and Stan Rogers recording there, among others.

=== 1980s-2010s ===
In 1985, ownership of the studio was passed on to Bob Doidge, another record producer who had spent extensive time at the studio. From then on, the studio continued to host Canadian musicians and bands like Big Wreck, Bruce Cockburn and The Killjoys, as well as international acts such as U2, Johnny Cash and Brian Eno.

In May 2018, a fire broke out on Grant Avenue, burning down three homes and causing over $1 million in damages. The studio building narrowly escaped the fire, but some damage occurred to the building's roof and basement.

=== 2020s ===
In early 2023, Bob Doidge sold ownership of the studio to partners Mike Bruce and Marco Mondano.
