= Bob Bossin =

Canadian singer

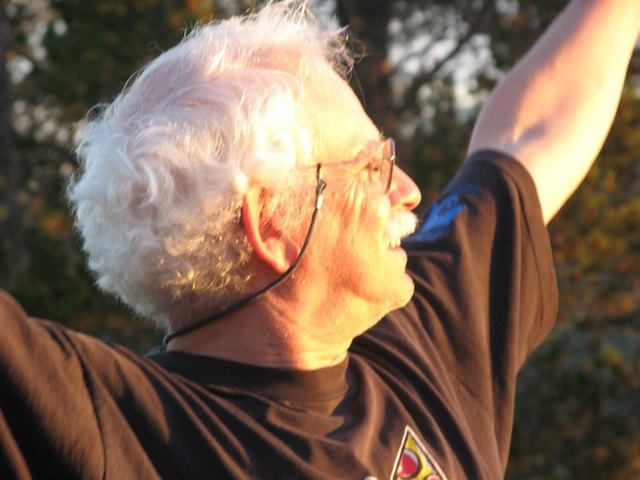
Bossin in 2010

Bob Bossin (born 1946) is a Canadian folk singer, writer and activist who co-founded the Canadian folk group Stringband with Marie-Lynn Hammond. Bossin is the writer of the songs "Dief Will Be the Chief Again", "Show Us the Length", "Tugboats", "The Maple Leaf Dog" and "Sulphur Passage (No pasaran)". As well, Bossin wrote and performed two solo musicals, Bossin's Home Remedy for Nuclear War and Davy the Punk. The latter is based on the book Davy the Punk (The Porcupine's Quill, 2014), Bossin's memoir of his outlaw father.

== Early life ==
Bob Bossin grew up in Toronto surrounded by artists, entertainers and writers. His mother, Marcia Bossin (née Marcella Louise Levitt, 1912–2006) was a painter. His father, David Bossin (1905–1963), was a booking agent for nightclubs. Two of Bob's uncles were writers: Hye Bossin was a columnist and editor, and Art Arthur (né Bossin) was a screenwriter. Arthur wrote the 1946 Academy Award-winning documentary, Seeds of Destiny.

As a boy, Bossin fell in love with the early rock 'n rollers – Elvis Presley, Chuck Berry, Gene Vincent – but by 1958 he had turned his ear to folk music. The variety, earthiness and politics of folk songs so captivated Bossin that the genre became his musical home for the next half century.

Bossin graduated from the University of Toronto in 1968. His university years coincided with the zenith of student and youth activism in Canada: the civil rights movement, opposition to the war in Vietnam, anti-nuclear and disarmament campaigns, and the nascent environment and feminist movements all engaged young people, Bossin among them. He became, and remained, a lifelong activist and social critic.

Those same years saw a revamping of CBC Radio by young, engaged journalists recruited from the student press, among them Doug Ward, Volkmar Richter, Mark Starowitz, and Peter Gzowski. When Gzowski became editor of Maclean's Magazine in 1971, he assigned 25-year-old Bossin a regular column. Bossin would continue to write essays and articles, and produce radio documentaries, for many years. But his main focus was music.

== Stringband 1971–1986 ==
A detailed history of Stringband can be found through the links section below.

In 1971, Bossin met Marie-Lynn Hammond, a young, bilingual singer and songwriter. He recruited Jerry Lewycky, a violin student at University of Toronto's Faculty of Music, to accompany them on fiddle. The configuration – guitar, banjo, fiddle and voices – was that of a string band, one of the traditional North American folk music forms.

Stringband's first album, on their own Nick Records label, was released in 1973. The timing was propitious: the early 1970s saw a burgeoning of Canadian culture. Young writers like Margaret Atwood and Michael Ondaatje were being published. Cultural institutions like Theatre Passe Muraille, the House of Anansi Press, Attic Records and CBC Radio's This Country in the Morning/ Morningside began. Stringband, with its repertoire of Canadian songs and stories, provided a sound track for this cultural revolution. "They search relentlessly for a Canadian sound," Canadian poet Doug Fetherling wrote of Stringband in Saturday Night Magazine in 1975. "Not hearing it, they have perhaps invented it."

In 1974, Lewycky left the group and was replaced by fiddler Ben Mink, who would become one of Canada's most respected musicians and music producers. Mink left Stringband in 1976 and jazz violinist Terry King took over on fiddle. King was followed by Zeke Mazurek in 1978 and Calvin Cairns in 1983. Bassist Dennis Nichol joined the group in 1979. Other musicians who played or recorded with Stringband include Frank Barth, Doug Bowes, Jane Fair, Daniel Lanois, Kieran Overs, Stan Rogers, Alan Soberman, Chris Whitely and, for a time replacing Marie-Lynn Hammond, singer-songwriter Nanci Ahern.

Stringband recorded nine albums, toured Canada for 15 years, and performed in the U.S., the U.K, the U.S.S.R, France, Mexico and Japan. They gained a loyal, almost fanatical, following. The group disbanded in 1986, but in 2001, former fans donated $25,000 to fund The Indispensable Stringband, a retrospective CD-box set released in 2002.

Historian of Canadian folk music, Gary Cristall, summed up Stringband's influence:

As they toured, they picked up regional images, stories and songs…. They had a repertoire that combined modernity and tradition, both official languages, family and history, politics and sex, geography and poetry, work and play.

For Canadian musicians, Stringband's most significant influence came not from their music, but from how they purveyed it. Bob… realized that if you sold your own records, you made a lot more money than if a record company sold them. Others soon realized it too, partly as a result of watching Stringband. Bob perfected things that are now standard in independent music far beyond folk circles.

…Stringband's core audience was the broad political and cultural left, the folks who built the anti-war movements, the environmental movement, and the women's movement… Stringband played their benefits and articulated their vision of the world. The band, and Bob and Marie-Lynn as individual artists, have never broken faith with these people or their beliefs.

== Songs and solo recordings ==
Stringband recorded many Bossin songs. Among the most popular were "Daddy Was a Ballplayer" (1972), "Dief Will Be the Chief Again" (1974), "Lunenberg Concerto" (1974), "Show Us the Length" (1974), "Tugboats" (1977), "The Casca and the Whitehorse Burned Down" (1978), and "Newfoundlanders" (1978).

Other singers, including Pete Seeger, Peggy Seeger, Ian Tyson and Valdy covered Bossin's songs. Despite little air play because of its explicit language, "Show Us the Length" became a favourite folk song among feminists and was performed by both professional and amateur singers as far away from Canada as New Zealand and Japan. In the U.S., Pete Seeger sang the song for years.

After Stringband disbanded in 1986, Bossin released several solo albums including Gabriola V0R1X0 (1994) and The Roses on Annie's Table (2005), the latter produced by Vancouver art-rock diva, Veda Hille. Bossin's songs included "The Secret of Life According to Satchel Paige" (1982), "Sulphur Passage (No pasaran)" (1989), "Ya Wanna Marry Me?" (1991), "Bill Miner" (1993) "Nanaimo" (2001), and "The Roses on Annie's Table" (2005).

"Bossin's songs were humane, evocative and literate," Gary Cristall writes in Some played harder... "He would give each song its own singer: an old camp cook reminiscing about the Wobbly who tried to organize cowboys; a tugboat man who, after 35 years on the Strait of Georgia, knew to 'wait and let it come to you.' Bob created Newfoundlanders who were not Canadian by a damn sight; Yukoners who brought lawn chairs and thermoses while the Casca and the Whitehorse burned down; and the guy from Saskatchewan hopefully awaiting the second coming of John Diefenbaker. Bob welded together sentiment, history and landscape as few songwriters have done."

=== Sulphur Passage and Clayoquot ===
From the late 1970s to the late 1990s, the fate of the wilderness of Vancouver Island's Clayoquot Sound was one of Canada's most hard-fought environmental causes. Bossin was involved from the beginning. He wrote songs and articles and produced radio documentaries, including "What Happened at Clayoquot" for CBC Radio's flagship Ideas program. One song, Sulphur Passage (No pasaran) was made into a music video by documentary director, Nettie Wild. Sung by a Who's Who of British Columbia folk artists – Bossin, Stephen Fearing, Roy Forbes, Veda Hille, Ann Mortifee, Raffi, Rick Scott, Valdy, and Jennifer West – Sulphur Passage won a half-dozen awards. The video can be seen through the links section below. Sulphur Passage became the anthem of the Clayoquot protesters and played a significant role in the preservation of the Clayoquot forest.

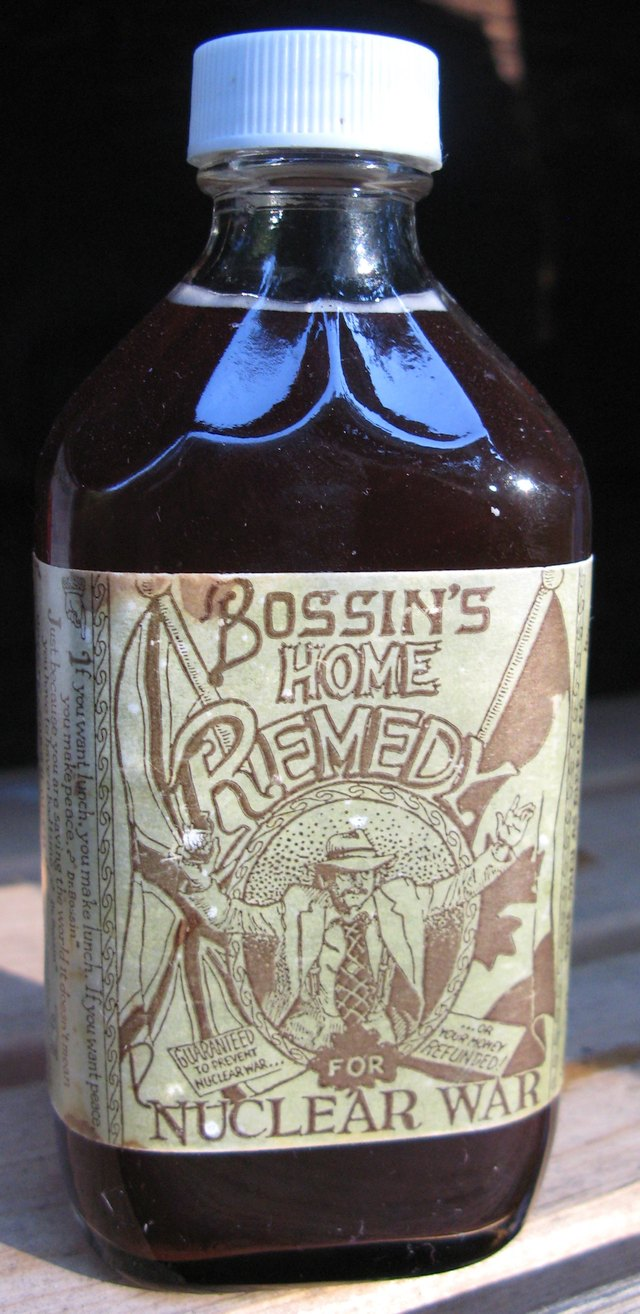
Bottle of Bossin's Home Remedy for Nuclear War

=== Bossin's Home Remedy for Nuclear War ===
In the 1980s, the advent of a new generation of nuclear weapons – Pershing, Trident and Cruise missiles – re-aroused the nuclear disarmament movement that had begun in the late 1940s. In Vancouver, British Columbia, tens of thousands marched in an annual Walk for Peace. The Vancouver East Cultural Centre commissioned Bossin to write a peace-themed show to coincide with the 1986 march. Bossin believed that the arms race would only be stopped by the activism of ordinary citizens, a "home remedy", so he created a musical medicine show, Bossin's Home Remedy for Nuclear War. The show was first directed by Jackie Crosland, and then, in subsequent stagings, by Colin Thomas, Peter Froehlich and Simon Webb. Home Remedy toured Canada, the U.S., New Zealand and Australia, selling over 9000 bottles of "Dr. Bossin's" potion.

=== Davy the Punk ===
In the 1930s, Dave Bossin, Bob's father, was a notable figure in Toronto's gambling underworld. Intrigued by his father's history, Bob collected stories about "Davy the Punk" (Dave Bossin's underworld nickname) and the race-track milieu he inhabited. In 2014, The Porcupine's Quill published Davy the Punk: A Story of Bookies, Toronto the Good, the Mob and my Dad to glowing reviews. Subsequently, the book won the Pinsky-Givon prize for non-fiction and was short-listed for the Vine Prize. It also received a citation from Heritage Toronto. Bossin then based a one-person musical, also called Davy the Punk, on the book. The show toured Canada for several years. A film version is planned.

Only one bear in a hundred bites but they don't come in order

In 2017 Bossin released Only one bear in a hundred bites but they don't come in order, a video on the danger of a catastrophic fire at the terminus of the controversial Kinder Morgan pipeline. The proposed pipeline would carry tar-sands oil from Northern Alberta to the Port of Vancouver. The project faced vehement opposition by coastal citizens and First Nations. This opposition contributed to the defeat of the British Columbia Provincial Government in 2017. Released during the election campaign, Only one bear... received 13,000 views on YouTube and over 100,000 views on Facebook. The video was edited and designed by Paul Grignon.

== Family life ==
Bossin lives on Gabriola Island, British Columbia with his wife, fabric artist and illustrator, Sima Elizabeth Shefrin. Shefrin's graphic novella, Embroidered Cancer Comic (Singing Dragon, London, 2016) is based on their life together after Bossin's 2011 diagnosis with prostate cancer. Shefrin also illustrated Bossin's chap book, Latkes (Nick Books, 2005). Bossin has two children, Madelyn ("Gee"), born in 1993 and Davy, born in 1999.

== Recordings ==
- Stringband, Canadian Sunset, 1973
- Stringband, National Melodies, 1975
- Stringband, Thanks to the Following, 1977
- Stringband, The Maple Leaf Dog, 1978
- Stringband Revisited, 1978
- Stringband Live!, 1980
- Stringband, Across Russia by Stage, 1983
- Bossin's West Coast, 1986
- Bossin's Home Remedy for Nuclear War, 1987
- The Way We Was, 1990
- Stringband, The Old Masters, 1991
- GABRIOLA V0R1X0, 1994
- Sulphur Passage (video), 1994
- What happened at Clayoquot, (recording of CBC Ideas radio documentary), 2000
- The Indispensable Stringband, 2002
- The Roses on Annie's Table, 2005

== Books ==
- Settling Clayoquot, 1981
- Latkes, 2007
- Davy the Punk, 2014

== Awards ==
=== Davy the Punk ===
- Pinsky Given Prize for Non-Fiction, Western Canada Jewish Book Awards, 2016
- Shortlisted for Vine Prize for Non-Fiction, Canadian Jewish Book Awards, 2016
- Honourable Mention, Heritage Toronto Awards, 2015

=== Sulphur Passage ===
- Special Merit Award and Best Music Video, World Wildlife Film Festival, Missoula, USA, 1995
- Special Merit Award, International Environmental Film Festival, Pretoria, South Africa, 1995
- Special Recognition Award, NAAEE Film Festival, Cancun, Mexico, 1995
- Call to Action Award, Mountain Film Festival, Telluride, USA, 1996

=== Latkes ===
- Sheldon Currie Prize for Fiction (2nd prize), Antigonish Review, 2007

=== Misc. ===
- Best feature article (nominee), National Magazine Awards, 2007
