= Willie P. Bennett =

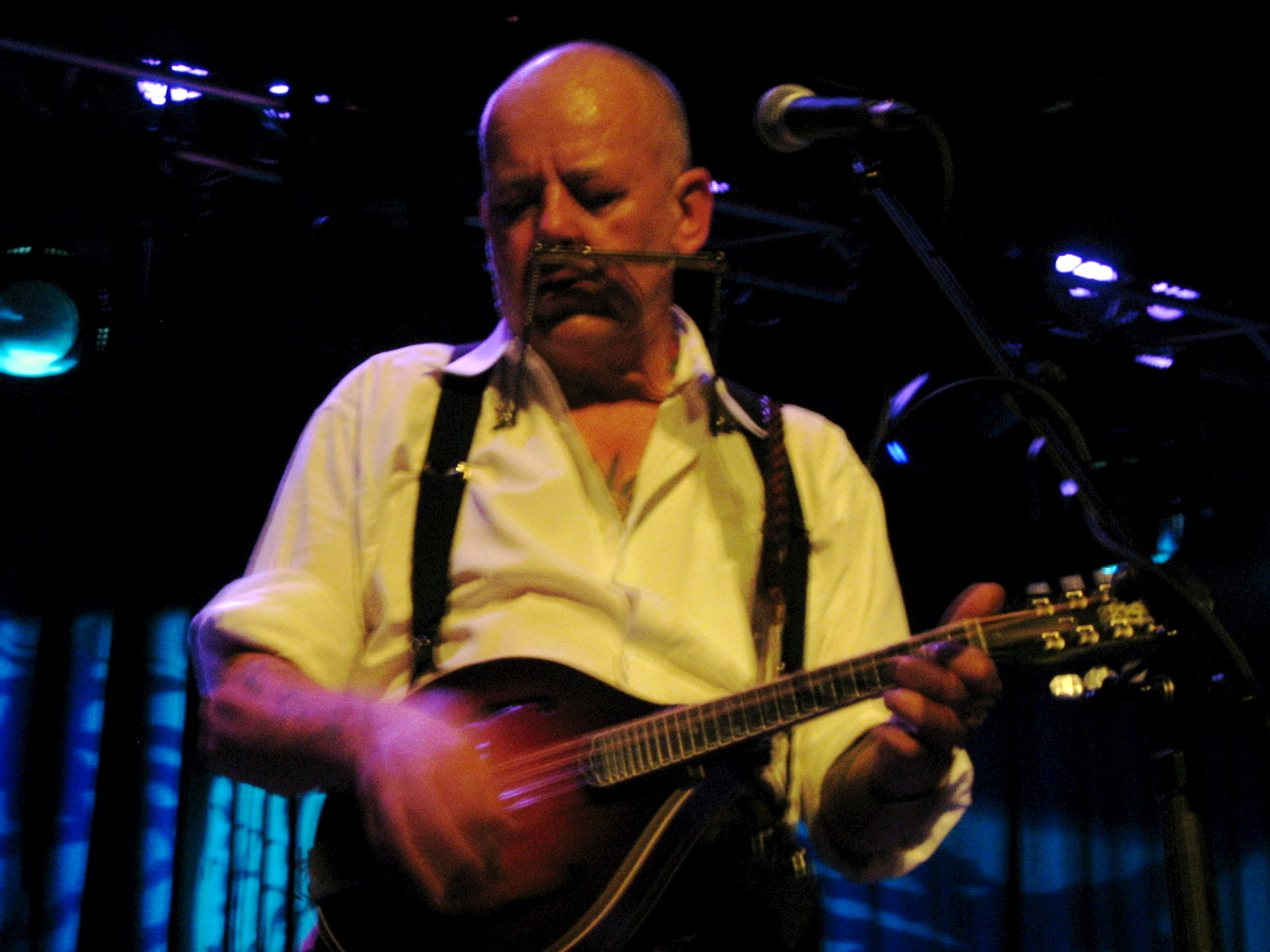
- Willie P. Bennett at the Roots of Heaven festival at Patronaat in Haarlem, Netherlands (2006)

Background information
- Born: William Patrick Bennett; 26 October 1951; Toronto, Ontario, Canada
- Origin: Toronto, Ontario, Canada
- Died: 15 February 2008 (aged 56) Peterborough, Ontario
- Genres: Folk, country, alternative country, bluegrass
- Occupations: singer/songwriter, mandolinist, harmonica player
- Years active: 1971–2007
- Labels: Woodshed, Duke Street, BNatural, independent.
- Formerly of: Fred Eaglesmith, Dixie Flyers
- Website: http://www.williepbennett.com

William Patrick "Willie P." Bennett (26 October 1951 – 15 February 2008) was a Canadian folk-music singer-songwriter, harmonica player, and mandolinist. Bennett was part of the 1970s folk music scene in Canada, and wrote and recorded many original songs. As well as performing as a solo artist, he was part of several well-known Ontario bands.

== Life and career ==
Born in Toronto, Bennett was first recorded by folksinger David Wiffen, who released a cover of "White Lines" in 1973. Bennett released his first album, including his own recording of the song, the following year.

As solo performer, he recorded seven albums. Early in his career, he also formed and fronted a newgrass group, the Bone China Band, touring through Ontario.

Throughout his career, Bennett kept busy as a sideman in bands fronted by other artists. From 1974 to 1979 he toured and recorded with the Dixie Flyers, playing harmonica, while continuing to perform as a solo artist. In the early 1990s, Bennett was a member of Peterborough, Ontario-based Pat Temple's band, the High Lonesome Players, playing live and appearing on their albums. In 1991 he joined Fred Eaglesmith's band, the Flying Squirrels, with whom he toured and recorded, playing chiefly mandolin and harmonica and singing backup vocals, also serving as road manager, until shortly before his death.

Bennett also played harmonica live and on recordings with Joe Hall, Doug McArthur, Sneezy Waters and many other country and folk artists.

Bennett co-wrote the song "Goodbye, So Long, Hello" with Russell deCarle. The song was recorded by deCarle's band Prairie Oyster, released as a single in 1990.

Bennett returned to prominence in 1996, when Stephen Fearing, Colin Linden and Tom Wilson formed Blackie and the Rodeo Kings, a supergroup named for Bennett's 1978 album, and recorded a tribute album featuring Bennett's songs. Bennett's first subsequent album of new material, Heartstrings, won a 1999 Juno Award for Best Roots and Traditional Album – Solo.

During a 2007 Victoria Day weekend concert in Midland, Ontario, Bennett suffered an on-stage heart attack; he continued playing to the end of the concert, but after that was forced to stop touring.

He died of another heart attack on 15 February 2008, at his home in Peterborough, Ontario. At the time of his death, he was recording an album and was planning on rejoining Fred Eaglesmith on tour. His sister inherited his music rights.

== Tributes ==
David Essig, producer of Bennett's first three albums, paid tribute to him in the song "Willie P", released on the 2009 album Double Vision (with Rick Scott). Canadian country singer Corb Lund wrote a song for Bennett on his 2009 album Losin' Lately Gambler, entitled "It's Hard to Keep a White Shirt Clean". Canadian songwriter Ian Tamblyn's 2009 album Gyre included a song he wrote for Willie called "Hurricane Heart". Americana songwriter Kenny Butterill wrote a song for Willie, "Wille We Miss Ya", released on his 2014 release Troubadour Tales.

In 2010, Bennett was inducted into the Canadian Country Music Association's Canadian Country Music Hall of Honour during the Canadian Country Music Awards. The award was accepted by his mother, sister and nephew.

The annual Fred Eaglesmith Charity Picnic in Aylmer, Ontario has hosted an annual Willie P. Bennett Memorial Hangover Run every year since 2010.

In 2014, the "Willie P. Bennett Legacy Project" was launched online, providing a space to share stories and new versions of Bennett's songs and to start a memorial award in his honour.

== Awards ==
- 1990 Canadian Country Music Association – Song of the Year, for "Goodbye, So Long, Hello" (co-written with Russell deCarle)
- 1998 SOCAN – Song of the Year: Most Played Country Songs of 1997, for "One Way Track" (co-written with Russell deCarle)
- 1999 Juno Award – Best Solo Roots And Traditional Album, for Heartstrings
- 2010 Canadian Country Music Hall of Fame – Inducted as Artist

== Discography ==
=== Singles ===
Year	Single	CAN Country	Album
1979	"Lace And Pretty Flowers" / "This Lonesome Feelin' "	—	Blackie and the Rodeo King
1989	"The Lucky Ones" / "Ain't Got No Notion"	19	The Lucky Ones
1989	"Train Tracks" / "Goodbye So Long Hello"	—	The Lucky Ones

=== Albums ===
Year	Album	Label
1975	Tryin' to Start Out Clean	Woodshed Records
1977	Hobo's Taunt	Woodshed Records
1979	Blackie and the Rodeo King	Woodshed Records
1985	The Lucky Ones	Self-Released
1989	The Lucky Ones	Duke Street Records
1991	Collectibles (Anthology)	Dark Light Records
1993	Take My Own Advice	Dark Light Records
1998	Heartstrings	Bnatural Records

=== Compilations ===
Year	Album	Label	Details
1979	Collage	Bytown BFFTF 1	Includes "White Line" (from Tryin' to Start Out Clean)
1979	Live at the Nervous Breakdown	Nervous Breakdown Productions NB001	Includes "Has Anyone Seen My Baby Here Tonight" recorded live in London, Ontario, with Mendelson Joe, (mislabeled "Storm Clouds" on LP cover)
1981	Touch the Earth	CBC LM 473	Includes "My Pie", recorded live in CBC Studio 4S in Toronto, 1974
2001	Festival to Go: All Canadian Sampler Vol. 2	Festival Distribution FDI 003	Includes "Restless Wind" (from Heartstrings)
2006	Hope: The Design Hope Songwriters Project	Design Hope	Includes the original song "Solitaire"
2014	Live From Dollar Bill's: Bootlegger's Legacy	Not on label	Includes "Tryin' To Start Out Clean", "Come on Train", "It's Not The Love You Give Me", recorded live in Kingston, Ontario

=== With The Dixie Flyers ===
Willie was a full time member of this bluegrass band, playing on harmonica what would generally be considered the fiddle part.

Year	Album
1975	Light Medium Heavy
1976	Cheaper to Lease
1977	Just Pickin

=== Pat Temple and the High Lonesome Players ===
Primarily on harmonica, but also mandolin and harmony vocals.

Year	Album
1990	Stone Boat
1991	Connecting Lines
1994	Cold Cuts

=== With Fred Eaglesmith ===
Willie played with Fred for 23 years, live & in the studio, playing acoustic & electric mandolin, harmonica, and singing backup & harmony. He was a full time member of Fred's backing band through various iterations and also worked as road manager.

Year	Album
1987	Indiana Road (as Fred J. Eaglesmith)
1990	Wooden Wheels in Hagersville (single-only release, as Fred J. Eaglesmith & The Flying Squirrels)
1991	There Ain't No Easy Road (as Fred J. Eaglesmith & The Flying Squirrels)
1993	Things Is Changin' (as Fred J. Eaglesmith & The Flying Squirrels)
1994	From the Paradise Motel (live, as Fred J. Eaglesmith & The Flying Squirrels)
1996	Drive in Movie
1997	Lipstick, Lies and Gasoline
1999	50 Odd Dollars
2001	Ralph's Last Show (live, as Fred Eaglesmith & The Flying Squirrels)
2002	Falling Stars and Broken Hearts
2003	Balin (as Fred Eaglesmith & The Flathead Noodlers)
2003	The Official Bootleg Series, Vol. 2 (live, with The Smokin' Losers & The Flathead Noodlers)
2005	There Ain't No Easy Road (DVD release of documentary film, includes four tracks performed live by Fred Eaglesmith and The Flying Squirrels)
2006	Milly's Cafe
2006	Pickin' In The Pines: Live At The 2005 Great Northern Picnic (live concert DVD, as Fred Eaglesmith And The Flying Squirrels)
2007	Live Below Sea Level (live concert DVD, as Fred Eagelsmith and band)
2008	Tinderbox

=== Other contributions ===
Year	Album	Artist	Details
1976	Sisteron	Doug McArthur	Harmonica
1977	Sad Songs & Waltzes	Bob Webb, Dougie Trineer, Frank Penner, Ross J. Allen	Harmonica on "Long Distance Call (Free Beer)", "Sad Songs And Waltzes", "Midnight Rider" (with Bob Webb)
1977	Larger Than Life	Denis LePage	Lead vocal & additional lyrics ("John Henry, The Gambler"), harmonica
1978	The Doctor Is In	Denis LePage	Harmonica ("Dalrymple", "Gravel Run", "Over The Rainbow")
1978	Hard Rock Miner	Glen Reid	Harmonica, band member
1979	Denis Lepage & Station Road	Denis Lepage & Station Road	Harmonica
197?	Musician at Large	Richard Knechtel	Harmonica
1980	It's High Time	Coyote	Harmonica
1981	Sings Hank Williams	Sneezy Waters	Harmonica
1985	Fire in the Snow	Terry Christenson	Harmonica
1986	The Immortals	Colin Linden	Backing vocals
1987	Summer Heart	Terry Christenson	Harmonica
1990	Different Kind of Fire	Prairie Oyster	Co-wrote "Goodbye, So Long, Hello" with Russel deCarle
1990	Violet And Black	Scott Merritt	Harmonica
1992	On The Lam	Rick Kane	Backing Vocals, Mandolin, Bass Guitar, Harmonica, Percussion; co-producer, engineer & mastering.
1993	Drinking with the Poet	Scott B. Sympathy	Harmonica
1994	Antarctica	Ian Tamblyn	Harmonica on "The Penguin Came From Pittsburgh" & "The Bloodvein"
1995	Straight Line	Katherine Wheatley	Mandolin, harmonica on "Main Street"
1995	Hear Them Callin'	Kevin Head	Harmonica & vocals on "Turn On Your Love Light", mandolin on "Flea Market Romance", harmonica on "Full Moon"
1995	The Stars Above	Tim Harrison	Harmonica
1996	High or Hurtin'	Blackie & the Rodeo Kings	Vocals, harmony vocals, harmonica, mandolin
1996	Slightly Haunted	Lynn Miles	Harmonica on "I Always Told You The Truth", "Long Time Coming", harmonica & mandolin on "The Ghost of Deadlock"
1996	She & She & She	Bird Sisters	Harmonica
1996	Lonely City Cowboy	Riki Gee	Mandolin, harmonica
1997	Blue Plate Special	Prairie Oyster	Harmony Vocals "She Won't Be Lonely Long", "In The Summertime"; Co-wrote "One Way Track" with Russell deCarle
1997	Flying Jenny	Linda McRae	Harmonica
1997	Industrial Lullaby	Stephen Fearing	Co-wrote "Coryanna", Harmonica on "So Many Miles Away", "Dog on a Chain"
1997	What Do You Hear In These Sounds	Dar Williams	Mandolin, vocals on "I'm Wilder Than Her" (with Fred Eaglesmith)
1998	Painter Passing Through	Gordon Lightfoot	Harmonica on "Uncle Toad Said"
1999	Handle with Care	Paul McKay & the Perfect Strangers	Lead vocals ("Bless This World'", "Back to the Country", "Maybe It's Crazy", "Wildwood Lullaby"), harmonica ("Back to the Country")
1999	Kings Of Love	Blackie & the Rodeo Kings	Harmonica & vocals ("Patience Of A Working Man"), mandolin ("Lean On Your Peers", "Red Dress"), harmonica ("If You Have To Choose")
2000	Rough but Honest Miner	Richard Wright	Harmonica (member of Wake Up Jacob Band)
2001	Walk On	Terry Tufts	Harmonica, Jew's harp
2002	Jazz: All Over The Map	Paul McKay	vocals on "Maybe It's Crazy", "Wildwood Lullaby"
2003	Dirty Rotten Shame	Stephen Hogg	Backing Vocals, Harmonica, Mandolin, Jew's Harp
2003	Just a Songwriter	Kenny Butterill	Mandolin
2005	The Canadian F̶i̶d̶d̶l̶e̶ Violin	John P. Allen	Guitar & harmonica on "Lace and Pretty Flowers"
2005	Sweet Relief	Lynn Jackson	Harmonica, mandolin
2005	Roger Marin Jr	Roger Marin Jr	Harmonica; Co-wrote "It Breaks My Heart" with Roger Marin Jr.
2006	I'm a Mountain	Sarah Harmer	Harmonica on "How Deep in the Valley"
2006	Hope: The Design Hope Songwriters Project	Various Artists	Mandolin on Linda Duemo track "Circus Life", harmonica on Dan Medakovic track "Fine Line'"
2007	Lovers Find Reasons	Lindsay Jane	
2007	Anywhere	Paul O'Toole	Mandolin on "Creepy Coated Love Song"
2007	High Roads	Roger Marin	Harmonica
2007	Redneck Lullaby	J.P. Riemens & the Bar Flies	Harmonica ("Indian Girl", "Small Town Inertia"), backup vocals ("Redneck Lullaby")
2007	I Dreamt I Had a Recurring Dream	Wally High and the Non-Prophets	Co-wrote "Angels in Prison (Biting at Angels)"; mandolin, harmonica, guitar, backing vocals on multiple tracks
2008	Evening Bird	Paul McKay & the Perfect Strangers	Lead vocals on "Just Another Kid in Graceland"
2015	Day For Day	Pat Temple	Co-wrote "Back In Style" with Pat Temple

== Cover versions ==
Song	Artist	Album	Year
Andrew's Waltz	Blackie & the Rodeo Kings	Kings of Love (also on the 2009 compilation Swinging From The Chains of Love)	1999
Andrew's Waltz	Claire Lynch	North By South	2016
Blackie & the Rodeo King	Blackie & the Rodeo Kings	High or Hurtin'	1996
Caney Fork River	Old Man Luedecke	My Hands Are on Fire and Other Love Songs	2010
Come on Train	Blackie & the Rodeo Kings	High or Hurtin'	1996
Country Squall	Blackie & the Rodeo Kings	High or Hurtin'	1996
Crying The Blues	Audrey Auld	Tonk	2013
Don't Blame Your Blues On Me	Blackie & the Rodeo Kings	Let's Frolic Again	2007
Don't Have Much to Say	Sneezy Waters	You've Got Sawdust on the Floor of Your Heart	1978
Driftin' Snow	Blackie & the Rodeo Kings	High or Hurtin'	1996
Faces	Blackie & the Rodeo Kings	High or Hurtin'	1996
For the Sake of a Dollar	Blackie & the Rodeo Kings with Russell deCarle	High or Hurtin'	1996
Goodbye, So Long, Hello	Prairie Oyster	Different Kind of Fire (also released as a single, 1990)	1990
Has Anyone Seen My Baby Here Tonight	Blackie & the Rodeo Kings	High or Hurtin'	1996
If I Could Take My Own Advice	Prairie Oyster	Different Kind of Fire (CD versions only, also b-side to US single release of Goodbye, So Long, Hello, 1990)	1990
If I Could Take My Own Advice	Pat Temple	Day For Day	2015
If You Have to Choose	Blackie & the Rodeo Kings	Kings of Love	1999
Job Disorder	Scott B. Sympathy	Neil Young Street	1990
Job Disorder	Blackie & the Rodeo Kings	High or Hurtin'	1996
John Henry The Gambler	Tom Wilson	Live at the Acoustic Grill	2010
Lace and Pretty Flowers	Binder Brothers	Binder Nation	2006
Lace and Pretty Flowers	Blackie & the Rodeo Kings	High or Hurtin'	1996
Lace and Pretty Flowers	John P. Allen	Canadian Fiddle (violin)	2005
Lace and Pretty Flowers	Sneezy Waters	You've Got Sawdust on the Floor of Your Heart	1978
Maybe Grandfather	Jay Linden	Ordinary Sunrise	2023
Music in Your Eyes	Colleen Peterson	Beginning to Feel Like Home	1973
Music in Your Eyes	Colleen Peterson	CBC Radio Canada International Broadcast LP (cat no. LM 410)	1976
Music in Your Eyes	Garnet Rogers	Garnet Rogers	1984
Music in Your Eyes	Blackie & the Rodeo Kings	High or Hurtin'	1996
Music in Your Eyes	Stan Rogers	From Coffee House to Concert Hall	1999
My Pie	Washboard Hank	Human Beans	2016
Patience of a Working Man	Blackie & the Rodeo Kings	Kings of Love	1999
Rains on Me	Blackie & the Rodeo Kings	High or Hurtin'	1996
Rains on Me	Doug Cox & Sam Hurrie	Old Friends	2017
Red Dress	Blackie & the Rodeo Kings	Kings of Love	1999
Sometimes it Comes So Easy	Blackie & the Rodeo Kings	Let's Frolic Again (also on the 2009 compilation Swinging From The Chains of Love)	2007
Stealin' Away	Colleen Peterson	Colleen	1977
Stealin' Away	Blackie & the Rodeo Kings	High or Hurtin'	1996
Step Away	Blackie & the Rodeo Kings with Emmylou Harris	Kings & Queens	2011
The Lucky Ones	Blackie & the Rodeo Kings	Kings of Love	1999
This Lonesome Feelin'	Blackie & the Rodeo Kings with Vince Gill	Kings And Kings	2016
This Lonesome Feelin'	Denis Lepage & Station Road	At the Cowboy Arms Hotel	1980
Tryin' to Start Out Clean	Colleen Peterson	Colleen (also on the 1994 compilation What Goes Around Comes Around)	1977
Turnkey	Blackie & the Rodeo Kings	High or Hurtin'	1996
White Line	Blackie & the Rodeo Kings	High or Hurtin' (also on the 2009 compilation Swinging From The Chains of Love)	1996
White Line	Billie Hughes	Horton, Bates & Best – The Last Catch	1981
White Line	David Wiffen	Coast to Coast Fever (also released as a single in 1974)	1973
White Line	Doug Seegers	A Story I Got To Tell	2019
White Line	John Starling	Long Time Gone	1993
White Line	Jonathan Edwards	Rockin' Chair (also b-side of the single Favourite Song 1976)	1975
White Line	Peter Pringle	Peter Pringle	1976
White Line	Pure Prairie League	Can't Hold Back (re-released on 2022 compilation Live! Takin' The Stage / Just Fly / Can't Hold Back)	1979
White Line	The Seldom Scene	Live at The Cellar Door	1974
White Line	The Seldom Scene	Remains To Be Scene	2025
Willie's Diamond Joe	Blackie & the Rodeo Kings	BARK	2003
Willie's Diamond Joe	Matt Andersen	Coal Mining Blues	2011
Willie's Diamond Joe	Russell deCarle Trio	Live at Loud Mouse Studios	2014
You Care	Kenny Neal	One Step Closer	2001

== See also ==
- Canadian rock
- Music of Canada
