= Tif Ginn =

American singer-songwriter

Tiffani Ginn, commonly known as Tif Ginn, is an American-Canadian folk singer and songwriter, most noted for her work as a duo with her husband Fred Eaglesmith.

Originally from Texas, Ginn began her career as a member of the duo The Ginn Sisters, also later known as The Fabulous Ginn Sisters, with her sister Brit Ginn. She met Eaglesmith in 2009 at the Old Settler's Music Festival, and they married in 2014.

She released the solo albums Tif Ginn in 2012 and Moving Day in 2019, and has been a contributing musician on Eaglesmith's albums Tambourine (2013) and Standard (2017). They released the album Alive in 2020 as a duo, and received a Canadian Folk Music Award nomination for Best Traditional Album at the 17th Canadian Folk Music Awards in 2022.
