= Stringband =

Canadian musical group

- Origin: Toronto, Ontario, Canada
- Genres: Folk
- Years active: 1971–1986
- Past members: Bob Bossin; Marie-Lynn Hammond; Ben Mink; Terry King; Zeke Mazurek; Calvin Cairns; Dennis Nichol; Jerry Lewycky; Nancy Ahern

Stringband was a Canadian folk music ensemble, fronted by Bob Bossin and Marie-Lynn Hammond. Founded in 1971, Stringband recorded four studio albums between 1973 and 1978, and was an active touring ensemble through 1986. There have been periodic reunions since then, the most recent occurring in 2013. Passing through Stringband's ranks at various times were Ben Mink, Terry King, Zeke Mazurek, Calvin Cairns, Dennis Nichol, Jerry Lewycky, and Nancy Ahern.

The group pioneered independent recording and artist-controlled album releases in Canada, and was noted for songs that explored Canadian themes, often with a humorous bent. No Stringband songs became commercial hits, though several became widely known, including "Dief Will Be the Chief Again", Bossin's tongue-in-cheek tribute to former Canadian Prime Minister John Diefenbaker. As well, Stringband's feminist anthem "Show Us The Length" became an international, underground "hit", despite having little airplay due to its explicit language.

== History ==
=== Founding and early years (1971–1977) ===
The band was founded in Toronto in 1971 by the core duo of Marie-Lynn Hammond (b. 1948 in Montreal) and Bob Bossin, (b. 1946 in Toronto), along with violinist Jerry Lewycky. The name "String Band" was a common appellation amongst folk groups, usually with an identifying characteristic or location attached, as with the Incredible String Band or The Iron Mountain String Band. The group chose "Stringband" as a temporary place-holder name until they could figure out exactly what sort of String Band they were—but a "first name" for Stringband never materialized, and so the unmodified name "Stringband" stuck.

Stringband initially played in Ontario coffeehouses and universities, later touring across Canada and internationally. The group was singularly activist among Canadian bands, performing frequently for anti-war, environmental and other causes.

Their first album, Canadian Sunset (1973), was released independently on their own 'Nick Records' label, and through aggressive promotion and constant gigging, managed to scrape into the RPM Canadian album charts, peaking at #97. Lewycky left after this album, and was replaced by Ben Mink.

Stringband's second album, National Melodies (1975), contained two of their best-known songs, "Dief Will Be The Chief Again", and the risque "Show Us The Length". Bossin attempted to shop the album to several Canadian labels, but they all passed, as they felt that the record had little commercial potential (and no commercial potential outside Canada). However, Al Mair of Attic Records took the time to explain to Bossin and Hammond that they could actually make more money selling a few thousand copies of the album on their own label than they could selling 10,000 albums on someone else's. Bossin took the advice to heart, and Stringband remained a totally independent band, with all their original releases being issued on Bossin's Nick Records imprint.

Mink left the band after National Melodies to join Murray McLauchlan's band (and later, the experimental progressive rock band FM). However, Mink would return to the group's orbit in later years to produce and mix projects by Stringband, as well as solo material by Hammond. Mink was replaced by new violinist Terry King.

Thanks To The Following (1977), Stringband's third album, was financed by advance subscription orders from fans of the group. These subscribers and investors' names appear on the LP's front cover.

=== Hammond leaves; "Whilom" Stringband era (1978–1979) ===
Hammond left Stringband at the very end of 1977 to establish a solo career. Early the following year, Stringband licensed several tracks to CBC Records, and a 'best-of' compilation called Stringband Revisited was issued. This is the only Stringband material not issued on the Nick Records label.

Meanwhile, Bossin recruited singer-songwriter Nancy Ahern as a replacement for Hammond—but at Hammond's insistence, this trio was not initially allowed to bill themselves as Stringband.

Bossin's solution was to bill the trio as Whilom Stringband, "whilom" being an archaic word for 'former'. Nevertheless, by the time of the group's fourth and final studio LP (1978's The Maple Leaf Dog), the "Whilom" had been dropped, and the Ahern/Bossin/King line-up issued the LP simply as Stringband. The Maple Leaf Dog was produced by ex-Stringband member Ben Mink. Daniel Lanois, later to be a world-renowned producer, was an engineer and session musician on the album.

In 1979, Ahern and King both left the group, drawing to a close the era of Stringband being a full-time group.

=== Hammond's return; 'part-time' touring era (1980–1986) ===
After the departures of Ahern and King, Bossin quickly invited Hammond to re-join the group. She agreed, on the proviso that Stringband would become a part-time enterprise that would allow her time to pursue her solo career, as well as her playwriting and other interests. Bossin, looking to pursue some solo endeavours of his own, agreed. Adding new violinist Zeke Mazurek and the group's first permanent bassist, Dennis Nichol, beginning in January 1980 Stringband resumed touring and playing folk festivals a few months each year. A live recording from the new line-up (Stringband Live!) was issued later in 1980; it also included guest contributions from former Stringband members King, Ahern, and Mink.

Stringband continued to play gigs on a steady part-time basis through 1986. Calvin Cairns replaced Mazurek on fiddle just prior to a 1983 tour of the Soviet Union; a live concert recording from this tour was issued on cassette as Across Russia By Stage later that year.

After a series of gigs at Vancouver's Expo '86 Stringband effectively dissolved, with Hammond and Bossin electing to concentrate on their solo careers. Bossin has continued to record on Nick Records, Hammond on her own label.

=== Reunions (1991, 2001, 2007, 2013) ===
In 1991, Stringband performed a few "20th Anniversary" reunion shows, and released The Old Masters, a cassette-only 'best-of' compilation. A more extensive reunion was organized for the group's 30th anniversary, partly at the instigation of CBC Radio's Stuart McLean, a big fan of the group. In addition to some reunion concerts, the group recorded 4 new songs for The Indispensable Stringband, a CD box set of 46 of their recordings. This compilation was released on Nick in 2002, and was funded with $25,000 contributed by friends and fans. The line-up for the new tracks was Bossin, Hammond, Cairns, Nichol, and Mink.

Stringband briefly reunited in Toronto in January 2007. The occasion was a benefit for Hammond, whose eyesight was damaged in a riding accident in 2006. In July 2013, the group (still with the same line-up from 2002) reunited once more to play five dates in western Canada.

== Tributes ==
Stringband's songs created for their authors a loyal cult following. Bossin's titles include "Tugboats", "The Maple Leaf Dog", "Show us the Length", "Lunenberg Concerto", and "Daddy Was a Ballplayer." Hammond's songs include "Vancouver", "Flying/Spring of '44", "I Don't Sleep with Strangers Anymore", "La jeune mariee" and, with Bossin, "Mrs. Murphy".

"They were not the first to write about Canada," writes Gary Cristall in his history of Stringband, "Stompin' Tom Connors and a host of regional writers had been doing that for years... But Stringband went further. Bob researched his songs like they were books. He made them sound simple, but underneath, they were complex pieces of art, not ditties. Bob's songs were humane, evocative and literate, welding together sentiment, history and landscape as few songwriters have done.

"Marie-Lynn brought to her songs a contemporary feminist voice, one that predated what, in the late 1970s would be called 'women’s music'... These songs are some of the best stories of women's lives written anywhere. If Bob, like a ventriloquist, projected his voice into his characters, Marie-Lynn used her talent like a ouija board to tap into the past and bring to life women who never got to tell their stories."

Looking back over Stringband's career in 2001, writer and broadcaster Stuart McLean wrote, "Like Gordon Lightfoot or Monique Leyrac, like Margaret Atwood or Robertson Davies, Stringband made you proud to be Canadian. They skated through the coffee houses and concert halls with the grace of Bobby Orr and the passion of Rocket Richard."

Cristall concludes: "[Theirs] is a story of victory against the odds; of how an intrepid band of dissidents confronted the dominance of foreign mercenaries to carve out a niche for homegrown music. It is the story of two important creative talents who disliked each other upon first meeting and proceeded to work together for the next two decades, battling behind the scenes while, on stage, they delighted hundreds of thousands of listeners from Tuktoyaktuk to Toronto, Mexico City to Moscow. Stringband laid down the roots of independent recording in Canada; they inspired scores if not hundreds of musicians, and they left behind a dozen of the best songs ever written in this country."

== Discography ==
=== Studio albums ===
- Canadian Sunset, 1973
- National Melodies, 1975
- Thanks to the Following, 1977
- The Maple Leaf Dog, 1978

=== Live albums ===
- Stringband Live!, 1980
- Across Russia by Stage, 1983

=== Compilations ===
- Stringband Revisited, 1978
- Stringband 20th Anniversary, The Old Masters, 1991
- The Indispensable Stringband, 2001
