= Drive-In Movie (album) =

Studio album by Fred Eaglesmith
- Released: 1996
- Label: Vertical
- Producers: Scott Merritt, Fred Eaglesmith

Fred Eaglesmith chronology
From the Paradise Motel (1994)	Drive-In Movie (1996)	Lipstick, Lies and Gasoline (1997)

Drive-In Movie is an album by the Canadian musician Fred Eaglesmith. It was released in 1996. Drive-In Movie was the first Eaglesmith album to be released in the United States. The album won a Juno Award for best "Roots & Traditional Album, Solo".

== Production ==
The album was produced by Scott Merritt and Eaglesmith. It was mostly recorded in Brantford, with some production work taking place in Nashville. Eaglesmith took a casual attitude in the studio, stating that the album was merely a reflection of how he felt at the time of the recording. Three of the album's 11 songs are about trains.

== Critical reception ==
Professional ratings
Review scores
Source	Rating
AllMusic	4.5/5 stars
Calgary Herald	3.5/5 stars
Edmonton Journal	4/5 stars
The Province	4/5 stars

The Calgary Herald wrote that "Eaglesmith's music is hypnotic in its sparse acoustic tones and though he's prone to a bit too much imagery concerning crashin' 'n' burnin' 'n' trains he's also got a knack for turning a phrase." The Edmonton Journal determined that "there's the twisted irony in Eaglesmith's tunes, that they can have the most downhearted themes with a sly smile that creeps in around the edges to make you chuckle."

The Province called the album "spare, left-of-centre country in the same league as Chris Smither, Joe Ely or Rosie Flores." The Gazette concluded that "Eaglesmith is at his best taking scenes of small-town North Americana and turning them into compelling vignettes of a disappearing way of life." The Christian Science Monitor noted that "Eaglesmith integrates poetic sensitivity with his daredevil imagery, producing an original vision." The Kingston Whig-Standard listed it as the sixth best album of 1996.

AllMusic wrote: "In the tradition of Texas songwriters such as Guy Clark and Robert Earl Keen—who evoke images of their home state with masterful clarity—he sings with the honest and sometimes mournful tone of a man who recognizes that the lifestyle he grew up with and loved is now drifting into the past." In 1999, the Riverfront Times stated: "Drive-In Movie sounded like Eaglesmith had been holed up in a Memphis train yard listening to Swordfishtrombones and working Dog Day Afternoon into a countrified musical."

== Covers ==
Catherine Britt covered "Drive-In Movie" on her debut album. "Wilder Than Her" was covered by Dar Williams.

== Track listing ==
No.	Title	Length
1.	"I Like Trains"
2.	"49 Tons"
3.	"Here's the Keys"
4.	"Crashin' & Burnin'"
5.	"Wilder Than Her"
6.	"White Rose"
7.	"Good Enough"
8.	"Soda Machine"
9.	"Freight Train"
10.	"49 Tons (Reprise)"
11.	"Drive-In Movie"
