= The Lucky Ones (Willie P. Bennett album) =

Studio album by Willie P. Bennett
- Released: 1985
- Recorded: Inception Sound, North York, Ontario
- Genres: Country music, Rockabilly
- Producer: Danny Greenspoon

Willie P. Bennett chronology
Blackie and the Rodeo King (1979)	The Lucky Ones (1985)	Collectibles Vol 1 (1991)

Singles from The Lucky Ones
- 1. "The Lucky Ones"; 2. "Train Tracks"

The Lucky Ones was the title of both the fourth and fifth albums released by Canadian singer-songwriter Willie P. Bennett, his only releases in the 1980s. Though the albums share the same title, they are completely different recordings, and mostly of different compositions. The two albums have only three compositions in common: "The Lucky Ones", "Reckless Baby" and "Patience of a Working Man".

Bennett self-released the first Lucky Ones album on cassette only in 1985. This album featured a solo acoustic side co-produced with Paul Trotter, and a second side backed with a band, including guitarist Colin Linden, who co-produced Side B with Danny Greenspoon and Willie.

A substantially different album, produced by Danny Greenspoon and featuring only a few of the same songs but entirely different recordings was released by Duke Street Records in 1989 (LP: DSR-31059, CD: DSRD 31059, cassette DSRC 31059). The tracks from this version have since been released in MP3 format through the iTunes Store, a consequence of Duke Street Records sale to the Universal Music Group, making it the only album by Willie P. Bennett available digitally.

The 1989 single release of "The Lucky Ones", rose to #19 on the Canadian Country Music charts. The song "Goodbye, So Long, Hello", co-written with Russell deCarle was later recorded by deCarle's band Prairie Oyster, who released it as a single. It was subsequently named the 1990 Song of the Year by the Canadian Country Music Association.

The 1989 album includes a re-recording of the title song from Bennett's debut album, Tryin' to Start Out Clean.

== 1985 release ==
=== Track listing ===
SIDE A COUSTIC

1. "Sometimes It Comes So Easy"
2. "Rains On Me"
3. "The Lucky Ones"
4. "L.I.A.D.T."
5. "Reckless Baby"
6. "Job Disorder"

Produced by Paul Trotter and Willie P. Bennett

SIDE B AND

1. "Maybe Grandfather"
2. "Push On"
3. "Sometimes It Comes So Easy"
4. "Our Love, Our Love"
5. "Patience of a Working Man"
6. "Heart Headlines"

Produced by Colin Linden, Danny Greenspoon and Willie P. Bennett

== 1989 release ==
=== Track listing ===
1. "Train Tracks" - 4:25
2. "The Lucky Ones" - 4:10
3. "Ain't Got No Notion" - 2:46
4. "Cryin' the Blues" - 3:11
5. "Goodbye, So Long, Hello" - 2:24
6. "Tryin' to Start Out Clean" - 3:34
7. "Reckless Baby" - 3:45
8. "Don't Have Much to Say" - 2:27
9. "Patience of a Working Man" - 3:30
10. "Andrew's Waltz" - 2:46

All words and music by Willie P. Bennett, except "Goodbye, So Long, Hello" by Wille P. Bennett and Russell deCarle. All song published by Top Side Charlie Music/Willie P. Bennett Publishing except "Patience of a Working Man" by Top Side Charlie Music/Mendelsongster Publishing & Willie P. Bennett Publishing.

=== Personnel ===
- Willie P. Bennett - vocals, harmonica, acoustic guitar, high-string guitar ("Cryin' the Blues", "Tryin' to Start Out Clean"), background vocals ("Patience of a Working Man")
- Al Cross - drums
- Tom Griffiths - bass ("Train Tracks", "Lucky Ones", "Ain't Got No Notion", "Trying to Start out Clean", "Reckless Baby")
- Kit Johnson - bass ("Cryin' the Blues, Goodbye, So Long, Hello", "Don't Have Much To Say", "Patience of a Working Man")
- John Sheard - piano, keyboard
- Jack Semple - electric guitar ("Train Tracks", "The Lucky Ones", "Ain't Got No Notion", "Tryin' to Start Out Clean", "Reckless Baby", "Don't Have Much To Say", "Patience of a Working Man"), acoustic guitar ("Andrew's Waltz")
- Colin Linden - lead guitar ("Goodbye, So Long, Hello"), background vocals ("Train Tracks", "Patience of a Working Man")
- Danny Greenspoon - acoustic lead guitar ("The Lucky Ones"), rhythm guitar ("Tryin' to Start Out Clean"), six-string bass ("Goodbye, So Long, Hello"), acoustic rhythm and high-string guitar ("Reckless Baby"), background vocals ("Patience of a Working Man")
- Mike Holder - pedal steel ("The Lucky Ones", "Ain't Got No Notion", "Tryin' To Start Out Clean", "Reckless Baby"
- Ben Mink - mandolin ("Cryin' the Blues", "Don't Have Much to Say"), electric five-string fiddle ("Cryin' the Blues"), acoustic fiddle ("Don't Have Much to Say")
- Colleen Peterson - background/harmony vocals ("The Lucky Ones", "Ain't Got No Notion", "Goodbye, So Long, Hello", "Tryin' to Start Out Clean", "Reckless Baby", "Patience of a Working Man")
- Russell deCarle - background/harmony vocals ("Goodbye, So Long, Hello", "Tryin' to Start Out Clean")
- Horn Section on "Train Tracks", "Patience of a Working Man": Sarah McElcheran - trumpet, Steve Donald - trombone, Jody Golick - tenor saxophone, Wayne Mills - baritone saxophone. Horn arrangements by Sarah McElecheran.
- String Section on "Andrew's Waltz": Roberto Occhipinti - upright bass, Lenny Solomon - violin, Claudio Vera - viola, Jose Shapero - cello. String arrangement by Lawrence Shragge
- Produced by Danny Greenspoon
- Engineered by Jeff Wolpert
- Assistant Engineer David Stinson
- Recorded and mixed at Inception Sound, Downsview, Ontario, Canada
