= Marie-Lynn Hammond =

Marie-Lynn Hammond (born August 31, 1948) is a Canadian folk singer-songwriter, broadcaster and playwright. Born in Montreal, Quebec, Canada to a Franco-Ontarian mother and an Anglo-Quebecer father, she is fluently bilingual and writes and performs material in both English and French.

She began her career as a founder of the folk music group Stringband, and later pursued a solo career. She was also a host of programming on CBC Radio in the 1980s and 1990s, including Dayshift and Musical Friends. She has also written several plays, including the bilingual musical Beautiful Deeds/De beaux gestes and the drama White Weddings, and was co-writer with Brigitte Berman of the screenplay to the 1994 film The Circle Game.

On August 26, 2006, Hammond was thrown from her horse while horseback riding, and sustained serious injuries. Her friends organized two benefit concerts at Hugh's Room in January 2007 to help raise money for her non-insured health care costs and lost income due to her inability to work. People who appeared at the concerts included Bob Bossin, Stuart McLean, Eve Goldberg, Garnet Rogers, Nancy White, Sylvia Tyson, Don Ross, Rick Salutin, Jian Ghomeshi and Mike Ford. The accident has left her with a visual impairment, but she has otherwise recovered and is working (and riding) again.

== Discography ==
- Marie-Lynn Hammond (1978)
- Vignettes (1983)
- Impromptu (1985)
- Black & White...and shades of grey (1990)
- Pegasus (2003)
- Two Old White Horses (2009)
- Creatures (2013)
- Hoofbeats (2013)

== Plays ==
- Beautiful Deeds/De beaux gestes (1985)
- White Weddings (1990)
