= Dixie Flyers =

Canadian bluegrass band

Dixie Flyers (bluegrass band)
- Origin: London, Ontario, Canada
- Genre: bluegrass
- Years active: 1974–present
- Labels: Boot, Flat top
- Website: dixieflyers.ca

The Dixie Flyers were a Canadian bluegrass band based in London, Ontario, Canada. The band first came together in 1974, and became one of Canada's best known bluegrass bands.

== Career ==
Original members of the band were guitarist Bert Baumbach, mandolinist Ken Palmer, harmonica player Willie P. Bennett, bassist Brian Abbey and Dennis LePage on the banjo. Although lead vocalists Baumbach and Palmer have been continuous members, over the years the band has seen a number of changes in the lineup. Dixie Flyer band members have included:

- Guitar: Bert Baumbach
- Fiddle: Gordon Stobbe, Peter Robertson (miscredited on at least one Boot Records album as "Peter Robinson"), and John P. Allen.
- Mandolin: Ken Palmer (died October 30, 2013)
- Bass: Brian Abbey, David Zdriluk, Luke Maynard, and Chris Ingram
- Banjo: Dennis LePage, David Jack, David Talbot, Paul Hurdle, Walter Maynard, and Darin Parise
- Harmonica: Willie P. Bennett (died February 15, 2008) and Mike Ethelston
- Dobro: Al Widmeyer, Blair Heddle, Darin Parise

The Dixie Flyers played at the Carlisle Bluegrass Festival in 1975, where they met Bill Monroe, and were subsequently invited to play at Monroe's Bean Blossom Festival in Indiana, USA. The band also played at the Cambridge Millrace Festival and the Blueberry Bluegrass Festival in Stony Plain, Alberta. They also played several times at the Canterbury Folk Festival in Ingersoll, Ontario. The band performed regularly at the Flint Folk and Bluegrass Festival in Michigan.

The Flyers recorded seven albums between 1977 and 1987, mostly on Boot Records, followed by one each in the 1990s and 2000s. They were the hosts of a television show called Bluegrass Express on CFPL in London in 1985 and also took part in a weekly radio show for seven years. The band appeared on the Tommy Hunter Show, and for a time managed the Back 40 Bluegrass Festival at Woodstock, Ont.

After a last stand with The Flyers at the Elgin County international plowing match in the fall of 2010, Ken Palmer retired due to heart problems. The band played on briefly without him before going on indefinite hiatus. On October 30, 2013, Ken Palmer died at the age of 65 after a bout of pneumonia contracted after a heart transplant. A few months earlier, in the spring of 2013, the band had been inducted into the London (Ontario) Music Hall of Fame, with both Palmer and Baumbach in attendance.

== Discography ==
Albums:

Name of Album	Label	Year
Light, Medium, Heavy	Boot Records	1977
For Our Friends	Boot Records	1980
Just Pickin'	Boot Records	1978
Cheaper to Lease	Boot Records	1978
Five by Five	Boot Records	1981
New Horizons	Stony Plain	1984
Business as Usual	Boot Records	1987
Live at the Wellington Tavern	Flat Top	1990
Right on Track	Flat Top	2005
