= Blackie and the Rodeo King =

Studio album by Willie P. Bennett
- Released: 1979
- Recorded: Grant Avenue Studios, Hamilton, Ontario
- Genre: Country
- Label: Posterity-Woodshed Records
- Producers: David Essig and Willie P. Bennett

Willie P. Bennett chronology
Hobo's Taunt (1977)	Blackie and the Rodeo King (1979)	The Lucky Ones (1985)

Blackie and the Rodeo King was the third album released by Canadian singer-songwriter Willie P. Bennett and was released as an LP album by Posterity-Woodshed Records in 1979 (PWS-013).

"Blackie and the Rodeo King" would be the inspiration for the name of the band, Blackie & The Rodeo Kings, something of a Canadian folk/roots supergroup whose first album was a collection of new covers of Willie P. Bennett songs.

Bennett re-released the album in remastered form on compact disc in 2001 on his own label, Bnatural Music. Digital remastering was done by Paul Riemens at the same facility the album was originally recorded: Grant Avenue Studios, Hamilton, Ontario.

== Track listing ==
Side one

1. "John Henry, The Gambler" - 2:25
2. "Has Anyone Seen My Baby?" - 5:40
3. "Stardust" - 3:17
4. "This Lonesome Feelin'" - 3:54
5. "Standin' by the Highway" - 4:52
6. "Blackie and the Rodeo King" - 3:36

Side two

1. "Ballad in Low "E"" - 2:58
2. "For the Sake of a Dollar" - 2:58
3. "Summer Dreams, Winter Sleeps" - 3:09
4. "Pens and Paper" - 4:26
5. "Take My Own Advice" - 2:05

All words and music by Willie P. Bennett, C&P 2001 Bnatural Music; except "Stardust" - by Carmichael, Parish.

== Performers/Credits ==
- Willie P. Bennett – vocals, harmonica, acoustic and electric guitars
- Mike Gardner - electric bass
- Mike Holder - pedal steel
- Denis LePage - banjo
- Steve Taylor - drums
- Chris Whiteley - harmonica, acoustic guitar, trumpet
- Ken Whiteley - piano, organ, electric guitar
- David Zdriluk - acoustic bass
- David Essig - mandolin, slide guitar
- Produced by: David Essig and Willie P. Bennett
- Recorded and mixed at: Grant Avenue Studios, Hamilton, Ontario
- Recording Engineer: Bob Lanois
- Mixing Engineers: David Essig and Bob Lanois
