= Hobo's Taunt =

Studio album by Willie P. Bennett
- Released: 1977
- Genre: Country music
- Label: Woodshed Records

Willie P. Bennett chronology
Tryin' to Start Out Clean (1975)	Hobo's Taunt (1977)	Blackie and the Rodeo King (1979)

Singles from Hobo's Taunt
- 1. "Lace and Pretty Flowers" Released: 1979

Hobo's Taunt was the second album released by Canadian singer-songwriter Willie P. Bennett and was released as an LP album by Woodshed Records in 1977 (WS-007). Produced by David Essig, the album was engineered by brothers Daniel Lanois and Bob Lanois. This production team had trouble capturing Willie's vocals, as he moved around too much, so had him lie down and sing while flat on his back.

The album contains one of Bennett's better-known songs, "Lace And Pretty Flowers", which has been covered by several other singers.

Bennett re-released the album on compact disc in 2000. The album was digitally remastered by Paul Reiemens at Grant Avenue Studios in Hamilton, Ontario and released on Bennett's independent label, Bnatural Music. In 2003 it was re-released by Japanese label Air Mail Archive (AIRAC-1039), as part of their "Canadian Singer Songwriters Series Vol. 2", in an LP-style slipcase. However, this edition was mastered from a vinyl LP.

== Track listing ==
All words and music by Willie P. Bennett Side one

1. "Come On Train" - 3:17
2. "Lace and Pretty Flowers" - 3:54
3. "Storm Clouds" - 4:37
4. "Hobo's Taunt" - 3:41
5. "Stealin' Away" - 4:26

Side two

1. "A Woman Never Knows" - 2:48
2. "Lonely One Car Funerals" - 3:38
3. "If You Have to Choose" - 3:52
4. "You" - 4:26
5. "Faces" - 5:04

== Performers and credits ==
- Willie P. Bennett – vocals, guitar, harmonica, high string guitar ("Come On Train")
- Steve Taylor - drums
- Ken Whiteley - piano, accordion, mandolin ("One Car Funerals"), vocals ("Hobo's Taunt", "Storm Clouds"), lead acoustic guitar ("You")
- Chris Whiteley - harmonica ("One Car Funerals", "If You Have To Choose", "Hobo's Taunt"/Trumpet ("Stealin', "A Woman Never Knows"), acoustic guitar ("A Woman Never Knows")
- Michael Gardner - Fender bass, bass, vocals ("Storm Clouds")
- Rick Taylor - electric Guitar, high string guitar ("If You Have to Choose", "Diamond Rings", "You"), harmony guitar ("Diamond Rings")
- David Essig - high string guitar ("If You Have To Choose"), mandolin ("If You Have To Choose")
- Tom Evans - saxophone ("Stealin' Away", "A Woman Never Knows")
- Daniel Lanois - electric guitar break ("A Woman Never Knows")
- Produced by David Essig and Willie P. Bennett
- Engineered by Daniel Lanois and Bob Lanois (Storm Clouds & Faces)
- Recorded at Grant Avenue Studios, Hamilton, Ontario
