= Fred Eaglesmith =

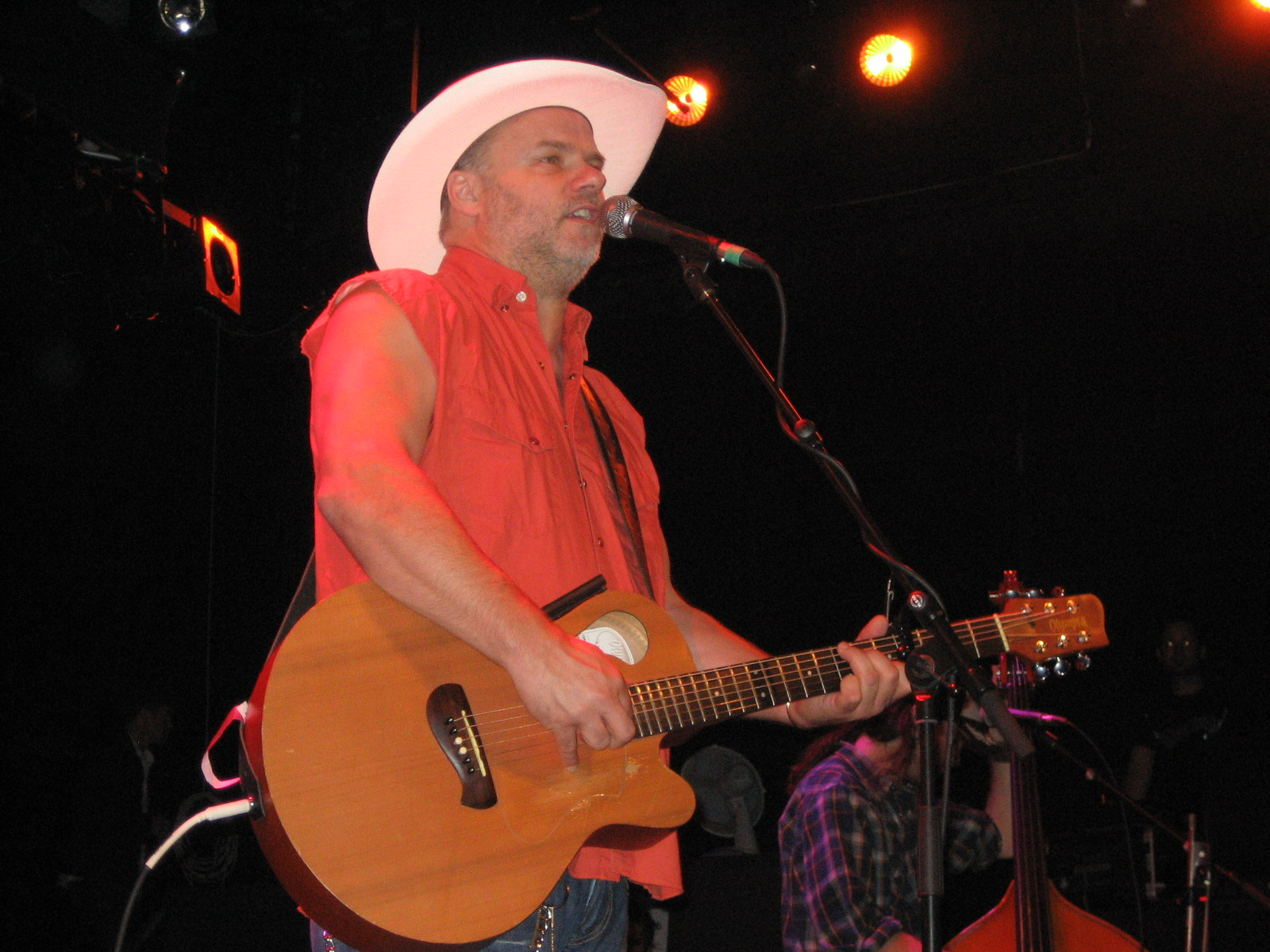
- Fred Eaglesmith at the Roots of Heaven festival at Patronaat in Haarlem, the Netherlands (2006)

Background information
- Born: Frederick John Elgersma; July 9, 1957 (age 69)
- Origin: Caistor Centre, Ontario, Canada
- Genre: Alternative country
- Occupation: singer-songwriter
- Years active: 1980–present
- Labels: A Major Label, Lonesome Day
- Spouse: Tif Ginn (2014–present)
- Website: www.fredeaglesmith.com

Frederick John Elgersma (born July 9, 1957), known by the stage name Fred Eaglesmith, is a Canadian alternative country singer-songwriter. He is known for writing songs about vehicles, rural life, down-and-out characters, lost love and quirky rural folk. His songwriting uses techniques of short story writing, including unreliable narrators, surprise endings, and plot twists.

== Early life ==
Eaglesmith, one of nine children, was raised by a farming family near Guelph in rural Southern Ontario. He began playing the guitar at age 12.

== Career ==
As a teenager Eaglesmith hopped a freight train to Western Canada and began writing songs and performing.

Eaglesmith founded a band known as the Smokin' Losers. He later formed a group called both the Flying Squirrels and the Flathead Noodlers, switching the name to represent different styles of music. The Flathead Noodlers play bluegrass, while the Flying Squirrels play more folk and rock. His first self-titled album was released in 1980.

Eaglesmith appeared in a 2001 television movie, The Gift.

A typical Fred Eaglesmith show includes his music set between several lengthy between-song comic monologues by Eaglesmith. Topics in the past have included stories about crossing the U.S.–Canada border, Newfoundlanders, and some friends from an Indian reserve. His fans are known as "Fredheads", a nod to deadheads, who followed the Grateful Dead. He is known to tour extensively throughout Canada and the U.S.

When Eaglesmith appears in solo performances, he bills himself as Fred J. Eaglesmith. In addition to his own albums, he frequently collaborated with the late Willie P. Bennett, a former member of Eaglesmith's band, who stepped down after a heart attack in early 2007. Eaglesmith publishes his own records.

In 2010, Eaglesmith was featured on the Late Show with David Letterman as the musical guest. He performed "Careless" from the album Cha Cha Cha.

Starting 2012, performances were billed as the Fred Eaglesmith Travelling Steam Show and include opening songs performed by Bill Poss, The Ginn Sisters, and Tif Ginn.

Fred co-wrote Tif's self-titled 2012 album with her, and the pair married in 2014. The backing band was disbanded in 2016 and they have been touring together as a duo since.

Eaglesmith's songs have been included in the musical play, Dear Johnny Deere. The play was performed at the Charlottetown Festival in 2013. Tif co-produced and mixed Fred's 2017 album, Standard.

== Band members ==
Initially a solo performer, Eaglesmith started performing as a trio with bass player Ralph Schipper and mandolin & harmonica player Willie P. Bennett around the time of his 1987 album Indiana Road. This group grew to a quartet with the addition of Washboard Hank on percussion and dobro. The group continued to evolve and change, using different names, including The Flying Squirrels, The Smoking Losers, The Flathead Noodlers, and The Fred Eaglesmith Travelling Steam Show. He retired the band in 2016 and toured as a duo with Tif Ginn until March 2020. Since the pandemic the pair have performed select, curated concerts with their new rhythm section The Tribute Band. In 2023, Fred and Tif co-wrote and self-produced a holiday record entitled ‘A Christmas Card’ with Costa Chatzis on drums and percussion, Andy Dmytryshyn on electric bass and guitars, Tim Elgersma on keyboards, and more.

=== Current members ===
- Fred J. Eaglesmith – guitars, vocals
- Tiffani Ginn – vocals, accordion, guitar, melodica, mandolin, ukulele, stand up bass, percussion
- Costa Chatzis — drums, percussion, vocals
- Jesse Murphy — electric bass, vocals
- Billy “Blue” Passalacqua - guitar, vocals

=== Former members ===
- David Essig – mandolin, guitar
- Scott Merritt – guitar, multiple instruments
- Willie P. Bennett – mandolin, harmonica, vocals
- Washboard Hank – washboard, dobro
- Ralph Schipper – bass, vocals
- Justine Fischer – bass
- Darcy Yates – bass, vocals
- Luke Stackhouse – bass, vocals
- Skip Wamsteeker – drums
- Jude Waldman – drums
- Kevin Komatsu – drums
- Kori Heppner – drums
- John P. Allen – fiddle
- Craig Bignell – banjo, vocals, percussion
- Roger Marin, Jr. – pedal steel, guitar, vocals
- Dan Walsh – dobro, guitar, vocals
- Matty Simpson – guitar, banjo, vocals
- Mike Zinger – mandolin, banjo
- Brit Ginn – vocals, flute
- Tim Elgersma - keyboards
- Chris Altmann - pedal steel, banjo
- Liam Brown - electric bass
- Andy Dmytryshyn - electric bass, guitars, vocals

== Discography ==
=== Albums ===
- Fred J. Eaglesmith (1980) as Fred J. Eaglesmith
- The Boy That Just Went Wrong (1983) as Fred J. Eaglesmith
- Indiana Road (1987) as Fred J. Eaglesmith
- There Ain't No Easy Road (1992) as Fred J. Eaglesmith & The Flying Squirrels
- Things Is Changin' (1993) as Fred J. Eaglesmith & The Flying Squirrels
- From The Paradise Motel (1994) as Fred J. Eaglesmith & The Flying Squirrels
- Drive-In Movie (1996)
- Lipstick, Lies and Gasoline (1997)
- 50 Odd Dollars (1999)
- Live: Ralph's Last Show (2001) as Fred Eaglesmith & The Flying Squirrels
- Falling Stars and Broken Hearts (2002)
- The Official Bootleg Series Volume 1: Live Solo 2002 (2002) as Fred J. Eaglesmith
- Balin (2003) as Fred Eaglesmith & The Flathead Noodlers
- The Official Bootleg Series Volume 2: The Fred Eaglesmith Texas Weekend 2004 (2004) as Fred J. Eaglesmith
- Dusty (2004)
- Milly's Cafe (2006)
- Tinderbox (2008)
- Cha Cha Cha (2010)
- 6 Volts (2011)
- Tambourine (2013)
- Standard (2017)
- Alive (2020, with Tif Ginn)
- A Christmas Card (2023)

=== Singles ===
- Take It All Away / Caroline (1987) as Fred J. Eaglesmith; from Indiana Road
- Wooden Wheels in Hagersville (1990) as Fred J. Eaglesmith & The Flying Squirrels; single-only release
- Watertown (2017) from Standard

=== Other appearances ===
- Lucille (live), Live at the Iron Horse Vol. 1 (1997)
- White Trash (live in studio), WNCW 88.7 – Crowd Around The Mic Volume 2 (1998)
- Seven Shells (live in studio), Gzowski in Compilation (1999)
- Little Buffalo (live in studio), KNON 89.3 FM: Texas Renegade Radio Vol.2 – Live In The Studio (2000)
- Hallelujah, Go Tell It On The Mountain, CMT Christmas (2001)
- Freight Train (live), Fish Out Of Water 3: Out Of The Fire - Into The Air (2003)
- I Like Trains (live), Dawson City Music Festival 50.30 – A CBC Compilation (2008)
- Arthur Dale's Statement, Miners' Angel - A Tribute To Mother Jones (2015)

=== Filmography ===
- There Ain't No Easy Road (2005) Documentary DVD
- Pickin' In The Pines: Live At The 2005 Great Northern Picnic (2006) Concert DVD, as Fred Eaglesmith And The Flying Squirrels
- Live Below Sea Level (2007) Concert DVD recorded live with band in 2006
- The Small Beers Tour (2009) Concert DVD recorded live solo in 2005
- The Fred Eaglesmith Traveling Steam Show (2015) DVD including both concert and documentary footage

=== Music videos ===
Year	Video	Director
1998	105	Steven Goldmann
1999	Rodeo Boy	Steven Goldmann
2007	Thinkin' 'bout You	Michael Salomon
2010	I Would	Roger Maunder
2013	Johnny Cash	Roger Maunder
