= Pat Temple =

Irish hurler

Personal information
- Native name: Pádraig Tiompail (Irish)
- Born: 1970 (age 55–56) Coolderry, County Offaly, Ireland
- Occupation: Agri business owner

Sport
- Sport: Hurling
- Position: Midfield
Club
- Years: Club
- Lusmagh
Club titles
- Offaly titles: 1
Inter-county
Years	County	Apps (scores)
1992-1995	Offaly	0 (0-00)
Inter-county titles
- Leinster titles: 1
- All-Irelands: 1
- NHL: 1
- All Stars: 0

Patrick Temple (born 1970) is an Irish former hurler. At club level, he played with Lusmagh and at inter-county level with the Offaly senior hurling team.

== Playing career ==
Born in Lusmagh, County Offaly, Temple played hurling as a secondary school student at Banagher Vocational School. He won an All-Ireland Vocational Schools' SHC medal in 1989, following a 1–12 to 2–06 win over Roscrea in the final.

Temple first played hurling at juvenile and underage levels with Lusmagh, before progressing to the club's senior team. He came on as a substitute in the 1–11 to 1–10 win over Seir Kieran in 1989, when the club captured their inaugural Offaly SHC title.

At inter-county level, Temple made his first appearance for Offaly as part of the under-21 team beaten by Galway in the 1991 All-Ireland U21HC final. Temple made his senior team debut during Offaly's National Hurling League-winning campaign in 1991. He made a number of appearances in the league over the following few seasons and was an unused substitute when Offaly beat Limerick in the 1994 All-Ireland final.

== Management career ==
Temple has also been involved in coaching and team management as a selector with the Lusmagh senior team.

== Honours ==
Banagher Vocational School

- All-Ireland Vocational Schools' Senior Hurling Championship: 1989

Lusmagh

- Offaly Senior Hurling Championship: 1989

Offaly

- All-Ireland Senior Hurling Championship: 1994
- Leinster Senior Hurling Championship: 1994
- National Hurling League: 1990–91
- Leinster Under-21 Hurling Championship: 1991
