= Tryin' to Start Out Clean =

Studio album by Willie P. Bennett
- Released: February 1975
- Recorded: January–February 1975
- Studios: Thunder Sound, Toronto,
- Genres: Country music, Bluegrass
- Label: Woodshed Records
- Producer: David Essig

Willie P. Bennett chronology
| Tryin' to Start Out Clean (1975) | Hobo's Taunt (1977) |

Singles from Tryin' to Start Out Clean
- 1. "White Line" Released: 1969

Tryin' To Start Out Clean is the debut album released by Canadian singer-songwriter Willie P. Bennett and was released as an LP album by his own label, Woodshed Records in 1975 (WS-004). The album was recorded and mixed at Thunder Sound, Toronto, January–February, 1975, after Bennett had been playing for some time with his bluegrass group, the Bone China Band. He promoted the songs from the album during his solo performances.

The album contains one of Bennett's best-known songs, "Music In Your Eyes", which was performed live and recorded, separately, by Canadian folk icons Stan Rogers and his brother Garnet Rogers, amongst others. "White Line" was first released as a single in 1969. In 2014, Canadian musician, Peter Thompson, released his album Music in Your Eyes which features Thompson's cover as the opening track.

Bennett re-released the album on compact disc in 2001. The album was digitally remastered by Paul Reiemens at Grant Avenue Studios in Hamilton, Ontario and released on Bennett's independent label, Bnatural Music. In 2003 it was re-released by Japanese label Air Mail Archive (AIRAC-1038), as part of their "Canadian Singer Songwriters Series Vol. 2", in an LP-style slipcase. However, this edition was mastered from a vinyl LP.

== Track listing ==
Side one

1. "Driftin' Snow" - 2:42
2. "White Line" - 4:26
3. "Me and Molly" - 3:34
4. "Don't Blame Your Blues on Me" - 2:04
5. "Country Squall" - 1:15
6. "In a Prayer" - 3:46

Side two

1. "My Pie" - 2:58
2. "Music in your Eyes" - 5:28
3. "Willie's Diamond Joe" - 3:41
4. "Down to the Water" - 4:20
5. "Tryin' to Start out Clean" - 3:40
6. "Driftin' Snow (Reprise) / Sault Creek III" - 1:50

All words and music by Willie P. Bennett, C&R 2001 Bnatural Music

== Personnel ==
- Willie P. Bennett – vocals, guitar
- Dennis Pendrith - bass
- Bill Usher - drums, percussion
- Chris Whiteley - harmonica, trumpet
- Ken Whiteley - piano, organ, lead guitar (on "Country Squall"), banjo (on "Reprise")
- Ron Dann - pedal steel
- Zeke Mazurek - fiddle
- Dave Essig - mandolin, rhythm guitar (on "Music In Your Eyes")
- Willie P. Bennett, Snarlin' Dave Quinn, Chris Whiteley, Ken Whiteley - backing vocals

Technical

- Produced by Dave Essig
- Engineered by Phil Sheridan
- Recorded and mixed at Thunder Sound, Toronto, January–February 1975
