= Scott Merritt =

Canadian singer-songwriter and record producer

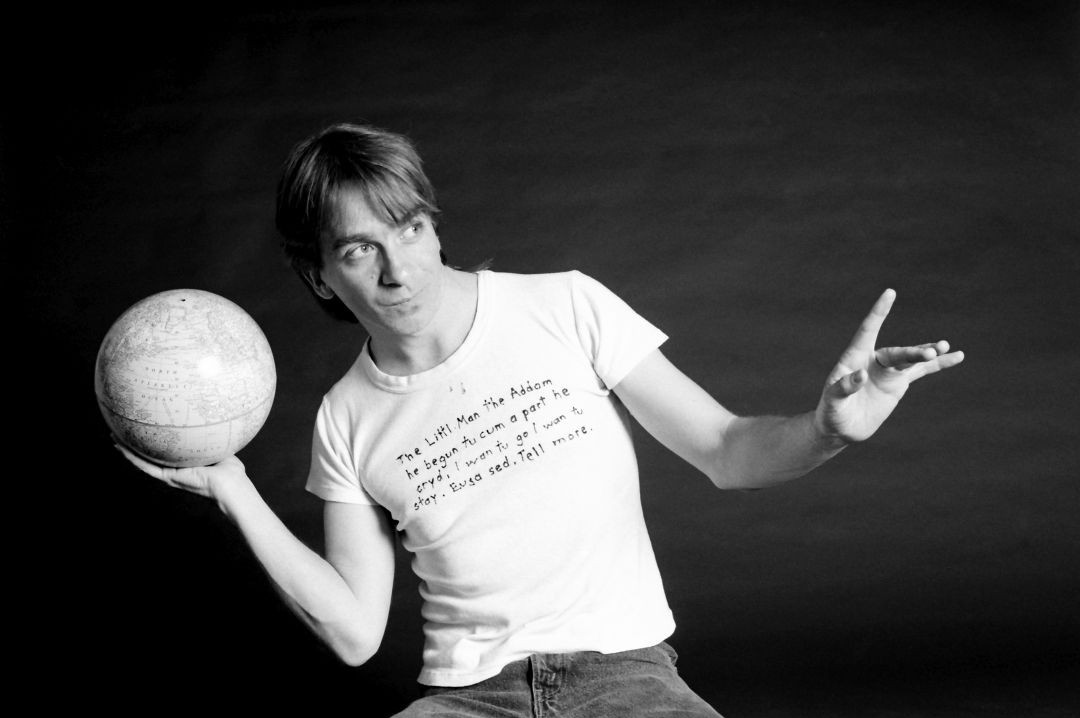
- Merritt, c. 1985

Background information
- Origin: Brantford, Ontario, Canada
- Genres: Folk/pop/rock
- Occupations: singer-songwriter, record producer
- Years active: 1970s-present

Scott Merritt is a Canadian singer-songwriter and record producer. Most prominent in the 1980s, he was a shortlisted nominee for Most Promising Male Vocalist at the Juno Awards of 1986.

Originally from Brantford, Ontario, in the late 1970s Merritt launched a career as a folk music singer-songwriter, performing both locally and on the folk festival circuit. His debut album Desperate Cosmetics, released in 1979, was engineered by Daniel Lanois.

He followed up with Serious Interference in 1983, supported in part by a cultural exchange tour of the United States with artists including Brent Titcomb and Tamarack. However, the album was not particularly successful, and Merritt began to pursue a more rock-oriented sound.

He signed to Duke Street Records in 1985. The label rereleased Serious Interference in early 1986, released his song "Transistor" as a single, and sent him out on tour as an opening act for Jane Siberry. He followed up later the same year with his third album Gravity Is Mutual, which was produced by Roma Baran and included guest contributions by Adrian Belew. That album's lead single, "Overworked and Underprivileged", became Merritt's most successful song on radio.

In 1990 his fourth album, Violet and Black, was released on Duke Street in Canada and IRS Records internationally. The album was produced by Arthur Barrow. However, both labels soon folded due to financial difficulties, leaving Merritt without a label.

He began at this time to concentrate on work as a recording engineer and record producer for other artists, including Stephen Fearing, Grievous Angels, Ian Tamblyn, Lynn Miles, The Barmitzvah Brothers, James Gordon, Garnet Rogers, Suzie Vinnick and Fred Eaglesmith. He continued to perform occasional live shows.

In 2002, Merritt released The Detour Home on Universal/Maple Recordings, his first new album since 1990.

His latest album, Of, was released in April 2015 as a limited edition vinyl and CD set.

== Discography ==
- Desperate Cosmetics (1979)
- Serious Interference (1983)
- Gravity Is Mutual (1986)
- Violet and Black (1990)
- The Detour Home (2002)
- Of (2015)
