= David Essig =

Canadian folk singer

David Essig (born December 2, 1945, in Frederick, Maryland) is a Canadian singer-songwriter, producer and record label owner.

== History ==
David Essig was born in Frederick, Maryland, in 1945. In 1971, he emigrated to Canada, and became a Canadian citizen in 1978. He was first introduced to Canadian audiences as a performer at the 1971 Mariposa Folk Festival. He developed a particular popularity in Italy, where he has toured over twenty times. In 1974, he established one of Canada's first musician-owned and operated record labels, Woodshed Records. A number of the label's releases were distributed by Posterity Records, owned by Harvey Glatt, under the Posterity-Woodshed label. The label was revived as "New Woodshed" in 1984. Records produced by Essig include releases by Willie P. Bennett, Cathy Fink and Duck Donald, Dixie Flyers, Fred Eaglesmith and Jackie Washington.
