= Dick Asher =

American lawyer (1932–2024)

- Born: March 1, 1932
- Died: July 23, 2024 (aged 92); Boca Raton, Florida
- Education: Tufts University; Cornell Law School
- Occupations: Marine Corps, lawyer, recording company executive
- Title: former president of PolyGram and Columbia Records
- Spouse: Sheila
- Children: Jeffrey

Martin Richard Asher (1932 – July 23, 2024) was an American lawyer and recording company executive. He later worked as an affiliate professor of music business at Florida Atlantic University. Asher worked with artists such as Bruce Springsteen, Bob Dylan, and Michael Jackson.

== Biography ==
Dick Asher became widely known to the general public through Fredric Dannen's 1990 book, Hit Men: Power Brokers And Fast Money Inside The Music Business, which chronicled Asher's music industry career, particularly focusing on his tenure as Deputy President of Columbia Records between 1979 and 1983, his corporate and personal battles with controversial label president Walter Yetnikoff, and Asher's attempts in the early 1980s to expose and defeat the growing influence of a cabal of independent record promotion agents known as "The Network".

A veteran of the United States Marine Corps, Asher received degrees from Tufts University and Cornell Law School before beginning his working life as a corporate lawyer. His music industry career began in the mid-1960s when he was appointed as Vice President of Business Affairs for the CBS (now Sony Music) group of record labels, which included the Columbia and Epic Records labels. One of his first major duties at CBS was a 1966 meeting with Bob Dylan in Woodstock, New York, shortly after Dylan's motorcycle accident, to negotiate the renewal of Dylan's Columbia recording contract. Asher rapidly gained a reputation for his honesty, integrity, loyalty, thoroughness and able business administration. In 1970 he was appointed Vice President of Capitol Records' east coast division, but the move was not a successful one for Asher (Dannen described it as "a disaster") and in 1971 Asher gratefully accepted Columbia president Clive Davis's offer to return to CBS.

In 1972, he was sent to London to take over Columbia's loss-making UK division, which he soon returned to profit, and he was subsequently promoted to become the head of CBS' entire overseas recording operation.

In 1979, the music industry experienced a major and rapid downturn in sales, and the CBS labels suffering a serious drop in profits. To deal with this crisis, then CBS Chief Operating Officer John Backe created the new position of Deputy President of Columbia Records and appointed Asher to the role, where he implemented a stringent but effective (although very unpopular) round of cost-cutting, during which he was obliged to retrench hundreds of CBS staff.

Asher identified a significant increase in payments to independent promotion agents as a major cost for CBS Records, estimating annual expenditures at around $10 million. Music publishers and record labels had long used "song pluggers", freelance promotions agents to distribute new releases. However, increased competition and the rise of the Top 40 radio programming format led to a heavier reliance on a small group of powerful independent promoters.

As he investigated Columbia's expenditures during 1979, Asher quickly realized that the cost of paying these "indies" (independent promotion agents) had skyrocketed – when he took over the CBS UK operation in 1972, an "indie" might only charge around $100 per week, but by 1980 it was estimated that the major labels were paying $100,000–$200,000 or more per record to hire these agents to promote their products to radio, and it was calculated that, industry-wide, the practice was by then costing at least $50 million annually. He also discovered that a group of the top independent American agents had organized themselves into a loose association known as "The Network", and that this group now had a virtual stranglehold over this crucial area of record company promotions.

In late 1979, Asher decided to test the power of The Network by deliberately not paying their agents to promote the new Pink Floyd single "Another Brick in the Wall" to radio stations in Los Angeles. The results dramatically validated his concerns - despite the fact that the group was the talk of the town at the time, performing sell-out concerts and garnering rave reviews, not one of the major L.A. radio stations would add the single to their playlist – but once the company resumed payments, the single quickly entered the Top 40, and in February 1980 its parent LP The Wall went to #1 on the Billboard album chart, where it remained for the next four months.

For several reasons Asher was determined to stop the practice of paying these "indies". But Columbia's volatile President, Walter Yetnikoff strenuously defended the use of the "indies" as being essential to the company's business. Asher was concerned about the wider ramifications of this practice. He realised that "The Network" was, in effect, an industry-wide extortion racket whose real power lay in its ability to prevent records from getting to radio, and he also suspected that its leaders may have had links to organized crime. Asher feared that this could precipitate another major scandal, on the scale of 1950s payola debacle, which destroyed the career of top DJ Alan Freed. Asher knew that there were instances of apparent fraud, in which the Network agents were charging large sums for the placement of records that in fact were never even played on radio, and that the use of "indies" could be construed as bribery. He feared this could lead to a major industry scandal with severe consequences for Columbia Records and its parent company, CBS Inc., including potential legal repercussions from the Federal Communications Commission.

In 1981, CBS and Warner Communications attempted a joint boycott of independent record promotion agents, known as "The Network." However, the boycott failed, and CBS's own label, Epic, continued making payments to The Network under different names.

In 1983, CBS Music reported its highest quarterly profit since the late 1970s. Asher was subsequently informed by the company's CEO, Yetnikoff that his employment was terminated. Despite attempts to resolve the situation, Asher was dismissed from his position.

Asher then spent almost a year "in the wilderness", during which time he found it almost impossible to find work, and was shunned by former colleagues, but in 1984, in a surprise move, he was brought in to act as a senior consultant on the proposed merger between the Warner and Polygram music groups. Ultimately Federal Trade Commission refused to approve the merger, but Asher had by then been appointed as a senior vice-president at Warner Communications, and in October 1985 he was headhunted to become the new president and Chief Executive of Polygram Records Inc.

Asher died at home in Boca Raton, Florida, on July 23, 2024, at the age of 92. Asher is survived by his wife of over 60 years, Sheila, a son, Jeffrey, four grandchildren and one great-grandchild.
