= Trevor Veitch =

Canadian musician/record producer (born 1946)

- Born: May 19, 1946 (age 80); Vancouver, British Columbia, Canada
- Occupations: Musician; record producer

Trevor Veitch (born May 19, 1946 in Vancouver, British Columbia) is a Canadian musician/record producer who has worked behind the scenes on many pop trends from the 1960s to present. He is mostly known for his involvement in the popular 1960s folk rock group 3's a Crowd, and for writing and producing successful pop songs in the 1980s. He resides in Los Angeles with his wife, Evan, and their son.

== Career ==
=== 1960s ===
In the 1960s, Veitch gained fame as a part of popular folk and rock group, 3's a Crowd. Veitch, who was singer Donna Warner's guitarist and accompanist, joined with Brent Titcomb to become the Bill Schwartz Quartet (a promotional name for only three musicians). Later, the Bill Schwartz Quartet recruited more members, including Ken Koblun, David Wiffen, and Richard Patterson, and changed its name to 3's a Crowd. 3's a Crowd is credited for helping expand the role of jazz and eastern music in the folk rock genre. The band broke up in 1968; Veitch's reasons were to pursue other projects.

=== 1970s ===
Veitch befriended Tom Rush in the 1970s and contributed his talent to several of Rush's albums.

- In Rush's self-titled album, released in 1970, Veitch played the guitar, mandolin, and mandocello.
- In Wrong End of the Rainbow (1970), Veitch played both the acoustic and electric guitar, dulcimer, and contributed background vocals to the album. Veitch also shares songwriting credits on the tracks "Merrimack County," "Rotunda," and the title song, "Wrong End of the Rainbow" with Tom Rush
- In the album Merrimack County, Veitch once again contributed his skills on the guitar, mandolin, and background vocals. He again shares songwriting credits on the tracks "Kids These Days" and "Merrimack County II" with Rush.

=== 1980s ===
In 1981, Veitch and fellow producer Greg Mathieson produced singer Toni Basil's giant hit, "Mickey" and her LP, Word of Mouth. In 1982, he wrote the English lyric for Laura Branigan's hit song "Gloria," which had originally been recorded by Italian singer Umberto Tozzi. He also produced Patty Brard's "Red Light" in 1986.

In 1987, Veitch took his talents overseas by working both production and music for the Japanese television series a·ki·re·ta–DEKA. He produced 4 songs for the soundtrack.
