= Walter Yetnikoff =

American music industry executive (1933–2021)

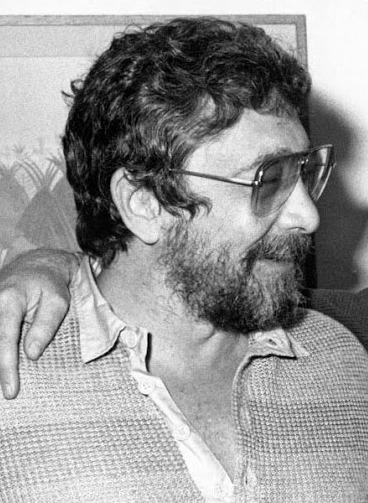
- Born: August 11, 1933; New York, New York, U.S.
- Died: August 9, 2021 (aged 87); Bridgeport, Connecticut, U.S.
- Education: Brooklyn College (BA); Columbia University (LLB)
- Years active: 1958–2021
- Spouse(s): June May Horowitz (divorced); Cynthia Slamar (divorced) Lynda Kady (m. 2007)
- Children: 2

Walter Yetnikoff (August 11, 1933 – August 9, 2021) was an American music industry executive who was the president of CBS Records International from 1971 to 1975 and then president and CEO of CBS Records from 1975 to 1990. During his career at CBS Records, which included Columbia Records and Epic Records, he guided the careers of Michael Jackson, Billy Joel, Culture Club, Earth, Wind & Fire, Cyndi Lauper, Bruce Springsteen, Barbra Streisand, Sade, "Weird Al" Yankovic, Miami Sound Machine, and many other successful acts.

In 1975, William Paley appointed Yetnikoff President and CEO of CBS Records. During his tenure he attracted stars like James Taylor and ex-Beatle Paul McCartney away from, respectively, Warner Bros. Records and EMI, and went on to "preside over the most profitable and prestigious stable of artists of all time." With Yetnikoff at the helm of CBS Records, Jackson's Thriller sold over 70 million copies, Springsteen's Born in the U.S.A. sold over 20 million, and Billy Joel's The Stranger sold in excess of 13 million. Yetnikoff also helped launch the careers of Lauper (on Portrait Records, which CBS owned), Culture Club (on Virgin Records, which CBS distributed at the time), and Gloria Estefan.

Yetnikoff was known for being a strong artist advocate. Billy Joel spoke of how Yetnikoff bought back Joel's publishing rights and gave them to him as a birthday present. Yetnikoff notes in the documentary film The Last Play at Shea that he had to threaten Artie Ripp to close the deal.

Also, in its early years, when the cable music station MTV refused to air many music videos by Black, Latino, Asian, and other non-White Anglo acts, Yetnikoff threatened to go public and accuse the station of racism, and stated he would pull all of CBS Records' acts from MTV if the station did not air the video to Jackson's "Billie Jean", a CBS artist, which had become a US number one hit.

At CBS, Yetnikoff was the chief architect of the sale of CBS Records, (which included Epic Records and Columbia Records) to Sony, which in turn created Sony Music Entertainment, in January 1988. Yetnikoff's memoir, Howling at the Moon, written with David Ritz, was published in 2004.

== Early life and education ==
Yetnikoff was born to a Jewish family in the New York City borough of Brooklyn, the son of Bella (Zweibel), a bookkeeper, and Max Yetnikoff, a hospital painter. He attended P.S. 182 and P.S. 149 before graduating from Brooklyn Technical High School (at the age of fifteen) in 1949. In 1953, he received his B.A. magna cum laude from Brooklyn College as a member of Phi Beta Kappa. Later that year, he entered Columbia Law School, where he attained a full scholarship after his first year and was an editor of the Columbia Law Review.

== Career ==
=== CBS Records International ===
After receiving his LL.B. from Columbia, he served in the United States Army in Cold War-era West Germany from 1956 to 1958. Following his discharge, he was hired by the law firm Rosenman, Colin, Kaye, Petschek and Freund, which represented William S. Paley and CBS.

In 1962, Yetnikoff joined CBS Records as a staff attorney at the behest of general counsel Clive Davis, a former colleague from Rosenman & Colin. After serving as general counsel of the CBS Records law department, he moved over in 1969 as Executive Vice President of CBS Records International, which grew exponentially under his leadership.

In 1968, as general counsel, Yetnikoff was instrumental together with Harvey Schein in forming CBS/Sony, a Japanese joint venture which became highly profitable under Akio Morita and Norio Ohga. Yetnikoff forged a close and lucrative working partnership with Sony executives, thereby establishing a groundbreaking collaboration between a major U.S. company and Japanese corporation.

In 1971, he was appointed President of CBS Records International.

=== CBS Records ===
In 1975, he became President and CEO of CBS Records.

Among his accomplishments, he is credited with having broken the MTV color barrier via Michael Jackson's "Billie Jean". He nurtured Michael Jackson's solo career from Off the Wall through Thriller. At the 1984 Grammy Awards, Jackson called Yetnikoff up to the podium saying that he was "the best president of any company." Yetnikoff was credited by Billy Joel with providing the necessary financial and promotional support that propelled his career to its eventual heights.

Under Yetnikoff's partial watch, "Weird Al" Yankovic became the highest-selling comedy artist of all time.

Gloria Estefan became the most successful crossover performer in Latin music to date under Yetnikoff's watch.

Yetnikoff also popularized and helped usher in the genre of freestyle via Lisa Lisa & Cult Jam.

Yetnikoff relentlessly pursued Paul McCartney and finally persuaded him to sign a deal that put the ex-Beatle's North American releases on CBS. Under Yetnikoff, in 1982, McCartney collaborated with Stevie Wonder on the number-one hit "Ebony and Ivory", included on McCartney's Tug of War, and with Michael Jackson on "The Girl Is Mine" from Thriller. The following year, McCartney and Jackson worked on "Say Say Say", McCartney's most recent US number one hit.

Yetnikoff was also involved in Barbra Streisand's biggest selling album, Guilty with Barry Gibb from the Bee Gees.

Yetnikoff features prominently in Fredric Dannen's landmark 1990 book Hit Men: Power Brokers and Fast Money Inside the Music Business, which chronicles Yetnikoff's many victories, as well as some of his less successful business deals, such as his costly decision to lure Paul McCartney to CBS by giving him the rights to Frank Music, the publishing company that controlled the music of leading composer Frank Loesser—a move which was later estimated to have cost the label around $9 million, and which gave McCartney sole ownership of one of the most lucrative publishing catalogues in the world. Dannen also detailed Yetnikoff's volatile temperament, his notoriously abrasive and sometimes abusive personal conduct, and his intense business battles with other labels and executives. Dannen's book particularly focusses on the 1979–1983 conflict between Yetnikoff and his deputy Dick Asher over the dubious practice of using independent promotion agents to place new records on radio station playlists—a practice that deeply concerned Asher, both because of its great cost (which Asher estimated in 1980 at $10 million annually for the CBS group alone) and because he worried that the practice might be found to be corrupt, and so could threaten the operations of the entire CBS group. The conflict climaxed with Asher's controversial sacking by Yetnikoff in April 1983.

The character of Walter Fox in the 1980 film One-Trick Pony, written by and starring Paul Simon, is loosely based on Yetnikoff, Simon alleging that Yetnikoff had tormented him to where the artist had suffered from writers’ block. Simon would leave Columbia during Yetnikoff’s tenure to sign with Warner Bros. Records.

=== Sony Music Entertainment ===
In 1988, Yetnikoff was the chief architect of CBS Records' sale to the Sony Corporation based on his decades-old relationship with Sony. The sale marked the first time that a Japanese firm bought a major American music company.

=== Velvel Records ===
After leaving Sony/CBS Records, Yetnikoff tried to make a movie about Miles Davis and launched a record label called Velvel which lasted for three years. Koch Entertainment acquired Velvel Records in 1999.

== Autobiography ==
In the late 80s, Jackie Kennedy Onassis, then an editor of Doubleday, approached Yetnikoff about writing his life story.

=== Howling at the Moon ===
Yetnikoff's autobiography, Howling at the Moon, co-written with David Ritz, was published in 2004. He recounted in it how a Catholic priest, Monsignor Vincent E. Puma, had helped him recover from his addictions to alcohol and drugs. The Jewish Yetnikoff noted that he viewed Father Puma as a mentor: "It'd be easier for the Pope to convert to Islam than for me to turn Catholic, but that didn't stop me from hanging out with a priest who understood the need for redemption." Entertainment Weekly praised the book as candid and noted "few record-company heads have written autobiographies, and fewer still have penned ones as candid as Howling at the Moon...Yetnikoff knows what readers want."

== Philanthropy ==
=== Eva's Village ===
In addition to being involved with Father Puma, in Eva's Recovery Center in Paterson, New Jersey, Yetnikoff volunteered in recovery centers around the New York region.

Over the years, Yetnikoff received awards from many philanthropic organizations such as the TJ Martell Foundation and anti-defamation league of B'nai B'rith.

== Personal life ==
Yetkinoff married three times. His first wife was his college sweetheart June May Horowitz; they had two sons, Michael Yetnikoff and Daniel Yetnikoff, before she died of cancer. His second wife was Cynthia Slamar. He lived with his third wife Lynda Kady and their dog Alexandra in New York City and upstate New York.

Yetnikoff died of bladder cancer on August 9, 2021, at a hospital in Bridgeport, Connecticut, two days before his 88th birthday.

== In popular culture ==
Yetnikoff was portrayed by Mike Myers in the 2026 biographic film Michael, based on the life of Michael Jackson.

Preceded by ?	President of CBS Records International; 1971–1975	Succeeded by ?
Preceded by Goddard Lieberson	President of CBS Records; 1975–1990	Succeeded by Sony Music Entertainment
