= Mansion on the Hill =

Mansion on the Hill may refer to:

- "A Mansion on the Hill", a Fred Rose/Hank Williams song, recorded by Williams in 1948
- "Mansion on the Hill", a Bruce Springsteen song on the album Nebraska
- "Mansion on the Hill", a Neil Young song on the album Ragged Glory
- "Mansion on the Hill", an Alabama 3 song on the album La Peste
- The Mansion on the Hill, a 1997 book covering the rock music industry
