= Tom Rush (1970 album) =

Studio album by Tom Rush
- Released: March 1970
- Recorded: 1970
- Genre: Folk rock
- Length: 34:21
- Label: Columbia
- Producer: Ed Freeman

Tom Rush chronology
The Circle Game (1968)	Tom Rush (1970)	Wrong End of the Rainbow (1970)

Singles from Tom Rush
- 1. "Drop Down Mama" Released: April 7, 1970; 2. "Lost My Drivin' Wheel" Released: June 5, 1970

Professional ratings
Review scores
Source	Rating
AllMusic	3/5 stars
Christgau's Record Guide	B+

Tom Rush is the eighth studio album by American folk rock musician Tom Rush. It was released in 1970. The album features cover versions of songs written by Jackson Browne, Murray McLauchlan, James Taylor and David Wiffen. It spent sixteen weeks on the Billboard 200, peaking at #76 on May 23, 1970.

== Track listing ==
Side one

1. "Driving Wheel" (David Wiffen) – 5:22
2. "Rainy Day Man" (James Taylor, Zachary Wiesner) – 3:07
3. "Drop Down Mama" (Sleepy John Estes) – 2:33
4. "Old Man's Song" (Murray McLauchlan) – 3:22
5. "Lullaby" (Jesse Colin Young) – 3:45

Side two

1. "These Days" (Jackson Browne) – 2:40
2. "Wild Child" (Fred Neil) – 3:13
3. "Colors of the Sun" (Jackson Browne) – 3:51
4. "Livin' in the Country" (Wyatt Day, Wendy Winsted) – 2:31
5. "Child's Song" (Murray McLauchlan) – 4:09

== Personnel ==
=== Musicians ===
- Tom Rush – guitar, vocals
- Trevor Veitch – guitar, mandolin, mandocello
- David Bromberg – dobro (track 1)
- Ed Freeman – 12-string guitar (track 4)
- Red Rhodes – steel guitar (track 8)
- Warren Bernhardt – organ, piano
- Paul Griffin – organ (track 1)
- Duke Bardwell – bass
- Ron Carter – acoustic bass (track 5)
- Herbie Lovelle – drums
- Julie Held – orchestral arrangements

=== Technical ===
- Ed Freeman – producer, arranger
- Jim Reeves – engineer
- Don Hunstein – photography
