= Ladies Love Outlaws =

Ladies Love Outlaws may refer to:

- Ladies Love Outlaws (Waylon Jennings album), 1972
- Ladies Love Outlaws (Tom Rush album), 1974
