= Wrong End of the Rainbow =

Studio album by Tom Rush
- Released: October 1970
- Recorded: 1970
- Genre: Country rock, folk rock
- Length: 37:43
- Label: Columbia
- Producer: David Briggs

Tom Rush chronology
Tom Rush (1970)	Wrong End of the Rainbow (1970)	Merrimack County (1972)

Singles from Wrong End of the Rainbow
- 1. "Sweet Baby James" Released: January 29, 1971; 2. "Wrong End of the Rainbow" Released: April 2, 1971

Professional ratings
Review scores
Source	Rating
AllMusic	4.5/5 stars

Wrong End of the Rainbow is the 1970 album from pioneer folk rock musician Tom Rush. The music on this album, his second in 1970, tends to lean more toward the country rock style. The album was on the Billboard 200 chart for nine weeks and charted as high as #110 on January 30, 1971.

== Track listing ==
Side one

1. "Wrong End of the Rainbow" (Tom Rush, Trevor Veitch) – 2:48
2. "Biloxi" (Jesse Winchester) – 4:40
3. "Merrimack County" (Tom Rush, Trevor Veitch) – 2:50
4. "Riding on a Railroad" (James Taylor) – 5:47
5. "Paddy West" (Arranged and adapted by Tom Rush) – :19
6. "Came to See Me Yesterday in the Merry Month of" (Ray O'Sullivan) – 1:43

Side two

1. "Starlight" (Tom Rush) – 4:38
2. "Sweet Baby James" (James Taylor) – 3:16
3. "Rotunda" (Tom Rush, Trevor Veitch) – 3:22
4. "Jazzman" (Edward Mark Holstein) – 2:33
5. "Gnostic Serenade" (William Hawkins) – 4:52

== Personnel ==
=== Musicians ===
- Tom Rush – guitar, vocals
- Trevor Veitch – acoustic guitar, electric guitar, dobro, mandocello, dulcimer, vocals
- David Bromberg – pedal steel guitar
- Paul Armin – violin, viola
- Bob Boucher – bass
- John Locke – organ, piano (tracks 1, 7)
- Erik Robertson – organ, piano (all tracks except 1, 7)
- Brent Titcomb – harmonica
- Dave Lewis – drums, percussion

=== Technical ===
- David Briggs – producer
- Jim Reeves – engineer
- Ed Freeman – arranger
- Bob Cato – photography, design
