= The Circle Game (album) =

Studio album by Tom Rush
- Released: April 1968
- Length: 38:16
- Label: Elektra
- Producer: Arthur Gorson

Tom Rush chronology
I Got a Mind to Ramble (1968)	The Circle Game (1968)	Tom Rush (1970)

Singles from The Circle Game
- 1. "No Regrets" Released: April 1968

Professional ratings
Review scores
Source	Rating
AllMusic	4.5/5 stars
Rolling Stone	(positive)
The Rolling Stone Record Guide	5/5 stars

The Circle Game is the sixth studio album by American folk musician Tom Rush. Released in 1968, it includes three covers of the singer-songwriter Joni Mitchell, as well as songs by Jackson Browne and James Taylor. Rush himself wrote "Rockport Sunday" and his often-covered tune "No Regrets", which has become a folk standard and has been covered by several dozen artists, including Emmylou Harris, The Walker Brothers, Olivia Newton-John, Curtis Stigers, and the band Luna.

== Background ==
The songs follow the cycle of a relationship from its beginning to an end. Joni Mitchell's "The Circle Game", recorded prior to her own release of the song on her 1970 album Ladies of the Canyon, can be read as the turning point of the relationship while "Rockport Sunday" ends the romance using an instrumental piece, followed by the coda "No Regrets". Supporting this concept is the cover shot, which pictures his then girlfriend Jill Lumpkin behind Rush as photographed by Linda Eastman.

On 9 May 2008, Rhino/Warner released a fully remastered 40th Anniversary Edition. Three bonus tracks were added, including the single versions of "Something in the Way She Moves" and "Urge for Going", plus a previously unreleased acoustic first take of "The Circle Game". In addition, the 42-second instrumental coda to "No Regrets", which ends the original album, appears for the first time on CD.

The Circle Game was Rush's highest charting album; it was on the charts for 14 weeks, reaching No. 68 on the Billboard 200 on 8 June 1968.

== Track listing ==
Side one

1. "Tin Angel" (Joni Mitchell) – 3:22
2. "Something in the Way She Moves" (James Taylor) – 3:25
3. "Urge for Going" (Joni Mitchell) – 5:50
4. "Sunshine, Sunshine" (James Taylor) – 2:55
5. "The Glory of Love" (Billy Hill) – 2:22

Side two

1. "Shadow Dream Song" (Jackson Browne) – 3:24
2. "The Circle Game" (Joni Mitchell) – 5:12
3. "So Long" (Charlie Rich) – 2:55
4. "Rockport Sunday" (Tom Rush) – 4:34
5. "No Regrets" (Tom Rush) – 3:50

=== 40th Anniversary Edition bonus tracks ===
11. Instrumental coda to "No Regrets" – 0:42
12. "Something in the Way She Moves" (single version) – 3:31
13. "Urge for Going" (single version) – 3:37
14. "The Circle Game" (take one) – 5:34

== Personnel ==
Musicians

- Tom Rush – guitar, vocals
- Paul Harris – keyboards, arrangements, conductor
- Bruce Langhorne – acoustic guitar
- Eric Gale, Hugh McCracken, Don Thomas – electric guitar
- Jonathan Raskin – classical guitar, bass guitar
- Bob Bushnell, Joe Mack – bass guitar
- Herbie Lovelle, Bernard Purdie, Richie Ritz – drums
- Joe Grimm, Buddy Lucas – saxophone

Technical

- Arthur Gorson – producer
- Bruce Botnick – engineer
- Brooks Arthur – engineer
- Jac Holzman – production supervisor
- Zal Schreiber – mastering
- Linda McCartney (née Eastman) – photography
- William S. Harvey – cover design
