= Columbia Records =

American record label

- Logo used since 1999
- Parent company: Sony Music Entertainment (2008–present): Previously: Columbia Graphophone Company (1925–1931); Grigsby-Grunow Company (1931–1934); American Record Corporation (1934–1938); CBS (1938–1988); Sony Corporation of America (1988–1991); Sony Music Entertainment Inc. (1991–2004); Sony BMG Music Entertainment (2004–2008; 50%)
- Founded: January 15, 1889; 137 years ago (as Columbia Phonograph Company) in Washington, D.C.
- Distributors: Sony Music Entertainment (International); Legacy Recordings (reissues)
- Genre: Various
- Country of origin: United States
- Location: New York City
- Official website: columbiarecords.com

Columbia Records is an American record label owned by Sony Music Entertainment, a subsidiary of Sony Music Group, an American subsidiary of the Japanese conglomerate Sony Group Corporation. Founded on January 15, 1889, Columbia is the oldest surviving brand name in the recorded sound business, and the second major company to produce records after Edison Phonograph Company. It is one of Sony Music's four flagship record labels, along with Epic Records, former longtime rival RCA Records, and Arista Records. RCA and Arista were originally owned by BMG until Sony's acquisition at the end of their merger in 2008.

== History ==
=== Beginnings (1888–1929) ===
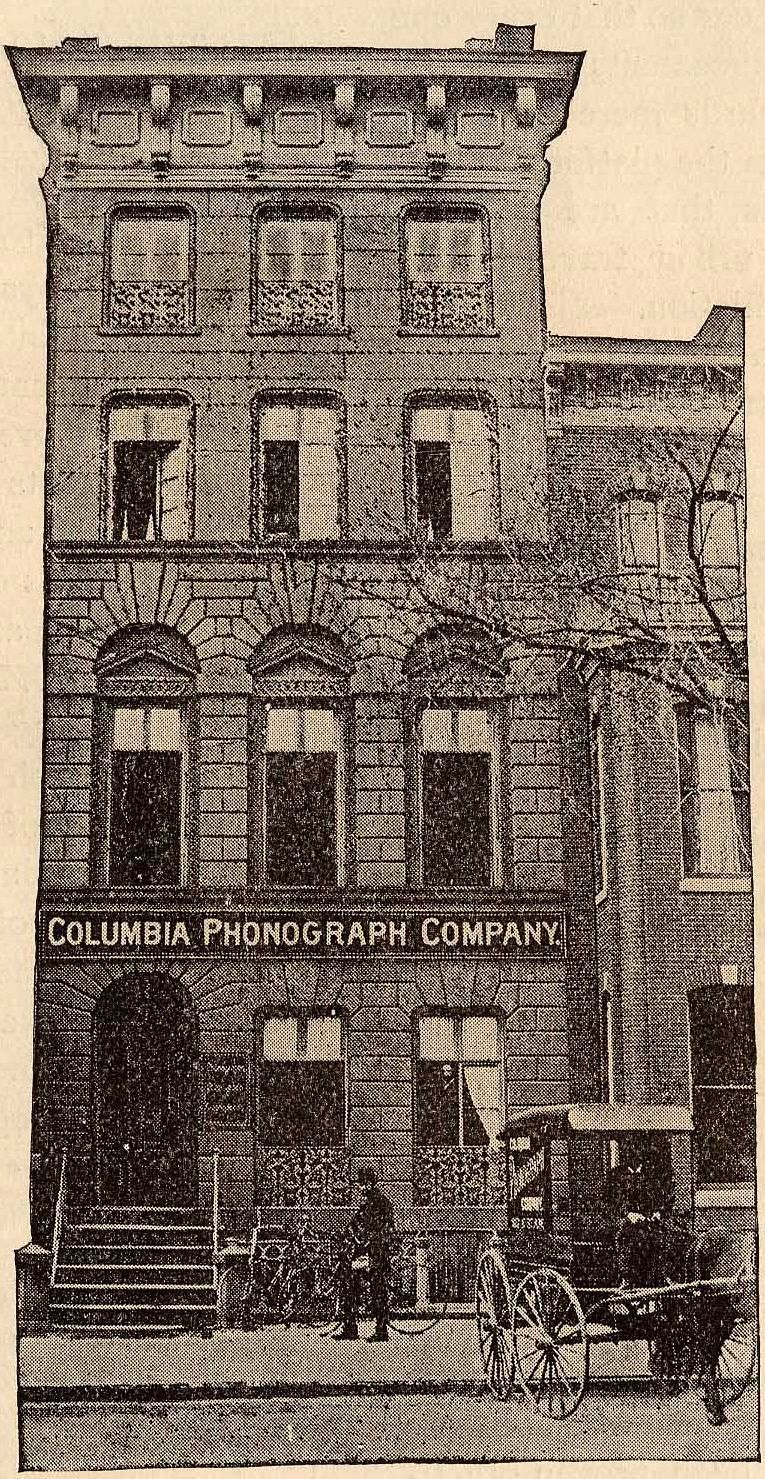
The original home of Columbia in Washington, D.C., in 1888; the company was named after the city.

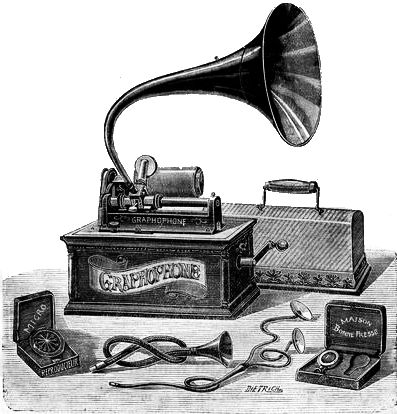
A Columbia type AT cylinder graphophone produced in 1898

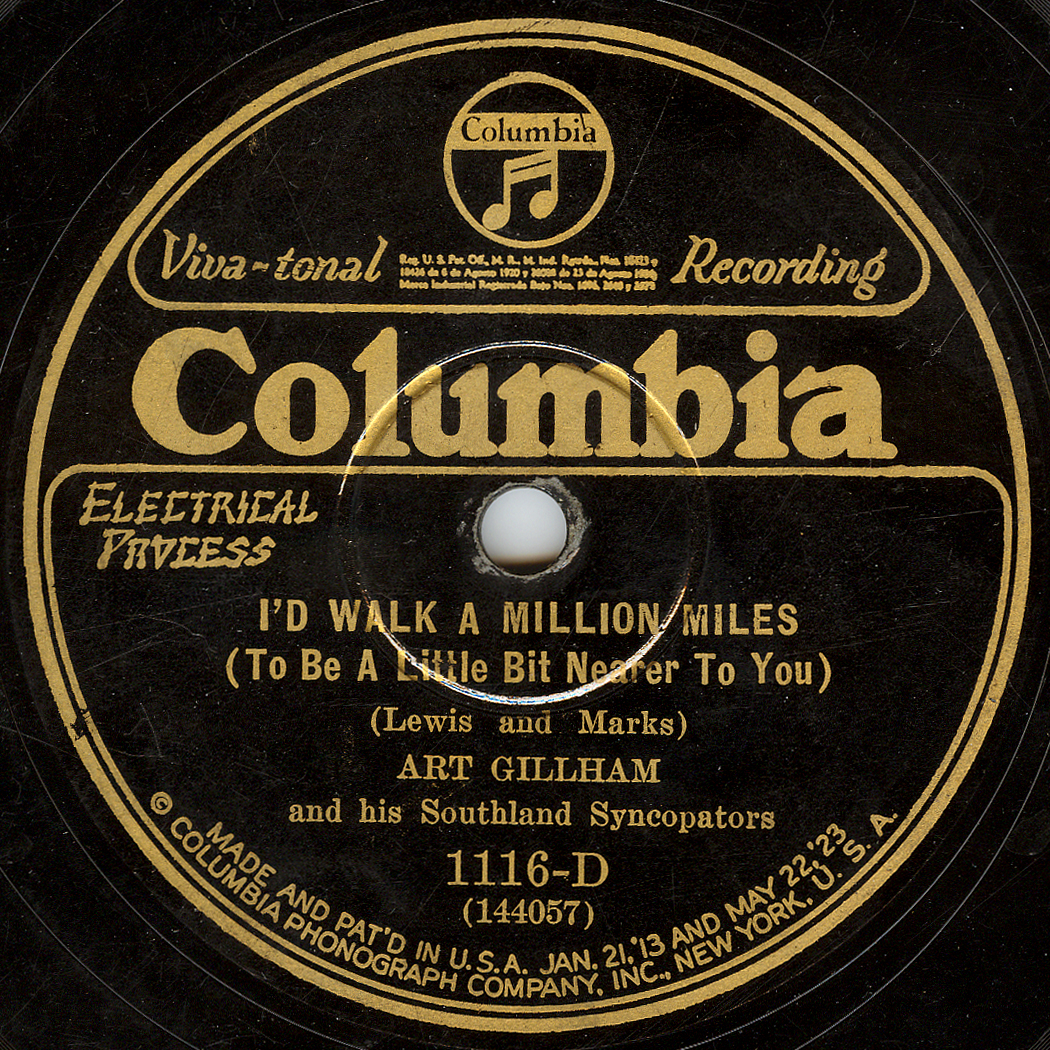
The American label of an electrically recorded Columbia disc by Art Gillham from the mid-1920s

The Columbia Phonograph Company was founded on January 15, 1889, by stenographer, lawyer, and New Jersey native Edward D. Easton (1856–1915) and a group of investors. It derived its name from the District of Columbia, where it was headquartered. At first, it had a local monopoly on sales and service of Edison phonographs and phonograph cylinders in Washington, D.C., Maryland, and Delaware. As was the custom of some of the regional phonograph companies, Columbia produced many commercial cylinder recordings of its own, and its catalog of musical records in 1891 was 10 pages.

Columbia's ties to Edison were severed in 1894 with the North American Phonograph Company's breakup. Thereafter, it sold only records and phonographs of its own manufacture. In 1902, Columbia introduced the "XP" record, a molded brown wax record, to use up old stock. Columbia introduced black wax records in 1903. According to one source, they continued to mold brown waxes until 1904. The molded brown waxes may have been sold to Sears for distribution (possibly under Sears' Oxford trademark for Columbia products).

Columbia began selling disc records, invented and patented by Victor Talking Machine Company's Emile Berliner, and phonographs in addition to the cylinder system in 1901, preceded only by their "Toy Graphophone" of 1899, which used small, vertically cut records. Their earliest record on disc was "In a Clock Store" by Charles J. Orth, listed as "No. 1". For a decade, Columbia competed with both the Edison Phonograph Company cylinders and Victor Talking Machine Company disc records as one of the top three names in American sound recording.

In 1903, to add prestige to its early catalog of artists, Columbia contracted several prominent singers from the Metropolitan Opera in New York to make a highly touted series of Grand Opera Records. These stars included Marcella Sembrich, Lillian Nordica, Antonio Scotti, and Edouard de Reszke, but the technical standard of Columbia's Grand Opera series was not considered to be as high as the results achieved with opera singers during the pre–World War I period by Victor, Edison, England's His Master's Voice (The Gramophone Company Ltd.) or Italy's Fonotipia Records. After an abortive attempt in 1904 to manufacture discs with the recording grooves stamped into both sides of each disc—not just one—in 1908 Columbia commenced successful mass production of what they called their "Double-Faced" discs, the 10-inch variety initially selling for 65 cents each. Columbia also introduced the internal-horn "Grafonola" to compete with the extremely popular "Victrola" introduced by the rival Victor Talking Machine Company in 1906.

During this era, Columbia began to use the "Magic Notes" logo—a pair of sixteenth notes (semiquavers) in a circle—both in the United States and overseas (where this particular logo would never substantially change).

In 1908, Columbia ceased the recording and manufacturing of wax cylinder records after arranging to issue celluloid cylinder records made by the Indestructible Record Company of Albany, New York, as "Columbia Indestructible Records". In July 1912, Columbia decided to concentrate exclusively on disc records and ended production of cylinder phonographs, although Indestructible cylinders continued to be sold under the Columbia label for a few more years. Columbia was split into two companies, one to make records and one to make players. Columbia Phonograph relocated to Bridgeport, Connecticut, and Edward Easton went with it. Eventually it was renamed the Dictaphone Corporation.

=== Columbia Phonograph Company ownership (1925–1931) ===
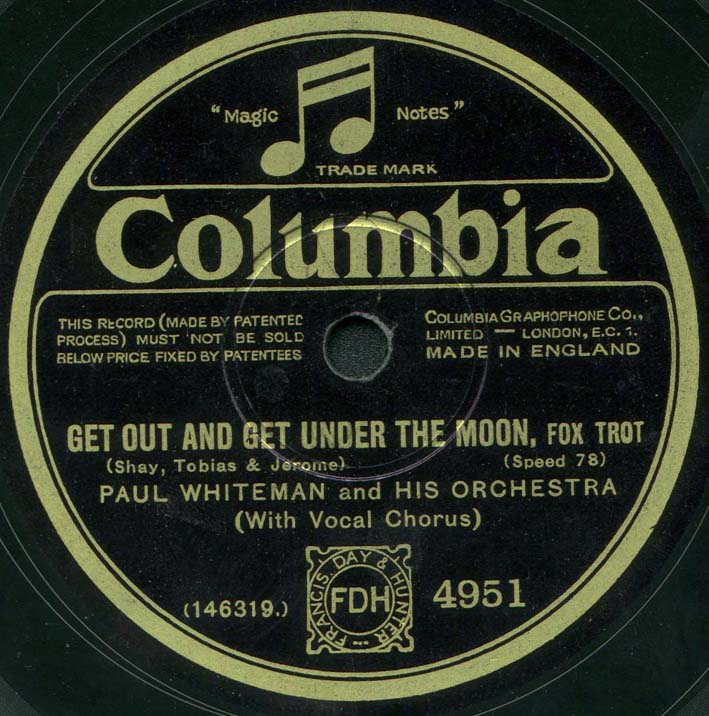
The British label of an electrically recorded Columbia disc by Paul Whiteman

In late 1922, Columbia entered receivership.

The company was bought by its UK subsidiary, the Columbia Graphophone Company, in 1925 and the label, record numbering system, and recording process changed. On February 25, 1925, Columbia began recording with the electric recording process licensed from Western Electric. "Viva-tonal" records set a benchmark in tone and clarity unequaled on commercial discs during the 78-rpm era. The first electrical recordings were made by Art Gillham, the "Whispering Pianist". In a secret agreement with Victor, electrical technology was kept secret to avoid hurting sales of acoustic records.

Louis Sterling, managing director of the Columbia Graphophone Company, had been the moving force behind bringing Western Electric's recording process, and the British takeover. Originally from New York, Sterling became Chairman of Columbia NY from 1925 until 1931, and oversaw stability and success.

In 1926, Columbia acquired Okeh Records and its growing stable of jazz and blues artists, including Louis Armstrong and Clarence Williams. Columbia had already built a catalog of blues and jazz artists, including Bessie Smith in their 14000-D Race series. Columbia also had a successful "Hillbilly" series (15000-D) with Dan Hornsby among others. By 1927, the sweet jazz bandleader Guy Lombardo also joined Columbia and recorded forty five 78 rpm's by 1931. In 1928, Paul Whiteman, the nation's most popular orchestra leader, left Victor to record for Columbia. During the same year, Columbia executive Frank Buckley Walker pioneered some of the first country music or "hillbilly" genre recordings with the Johnson City sessions in Tennessee, including artists such as Clarence Horton Greene and "Fiddlin'" Charlie Bowman. He followed that with a return to Tennessee the next year, and recording sessions in other cities of the South. The Two Black Crows 1926 recording "The Early Bird Catches the Worm" sold 2.5 million copies.

In 1929, Ben Selvin became house bandleader and A. & R. director. Other favorites in the Viva-tonal era included Ruth Etting, Paul Whiteman, Fletcher Henderson, Ipana Troubadours (a Sam Lanin group), and Ted Lewis. Columbia used acoustic recording for "budget label" pop product well into 1929 on the labels Harmony, Velvet Tone (both general purpose labels), and Diva (sold exclusively at W.T. Grant stores). When Edison Records folded, Columbia was the oldest surviving record label.

=== Columbia ownership separation (1931–1936) ===
The repercussions of the stock market crash of 1929 and subsequent Great Depression led to the near collapse of the entire recording industry and, in March 1931, J.P Morgan, the major shareholder, steered the Columbia Graphophone Company (along with Odeon records and Parlophone, which it had owned since 1926) into a merger with the Gramophone Company ("His Master's Voice") to form Electric and Musical Industries Ltd (EMI). Since the Gramophone Company (HMV) was now a wholly owned subsidiary of Victor, and Columbia in America was a subsidiary of UK Columbia, Victor now technically owned its largest rival in the US. To avoid antitrust legislation, EMI had to sell off its US Columbia operation, which continued to release pressings of matrices made in the UK.

In December, 1931, the U.S. Columbia Phonograph Company, Inc. was acquired by the Grigsby-Grunow Company, the manufacturers of Majestic radios and refrigerators. When Grigsby-Grunow declared bankruptcy in November 1933, Columbia was placed in receivership, and in June 1934, the company was sold to Sacro Enterprises Inc. ("Sacro") for $70,000. Sacro was incorporated a few days before the sale in New York. Public documents do not contain any names. Many suspect that it was a shell corporation set up by Consolidated Films Industries, Inc. ("CFI") to hold the Columbia stock, while its subsidiary, American Record Corporation ("ARC"), operated the label. This assumption grew out of the ease which CFI later exhibited in selling Columbia in 1938.

On December 3, 1931, CFI made a deal with Warner Brothers Pictures, Inc. ("WB") to lease Brunswick Record Corporation, which included the trademarks and masters of the Brunswick, Vocalion, and Melotone labels to ARC. WB would receive a portion of the sales of its catalogues, while ARC was free to use the labels for new recordings. Brunswick immediately became the premium $.75 label, Melotone would release new hillbilly and other $.35 dime-store discounted discs, and Vocalion, while re-releasing prior ARC records, would also be the blues-R&B label, and the exclusive outlet for Bob Wills and His Texas Playboys, a mid-1930s Western Swing band which drew 10,000+ customers nightly to dance. Columbia was added in mid-1932, relegated to slower sellers such as the Hawaiian music of Andy Iona, the Irving Mills stable of artists and songs, and the still unknown Benny Goodman. It tried a marketing ploy, the Columbia "Royal Blue Record", a blue laminated product with matching label. Royal Blue issues, made from late 1932 through 1935, are particularly popular with collectors for their rarity and musical interest. The Columbia plant in Oakland, California, did Columbia's pressings for sale west of the Rockies and continued using the Royal Blue material for these until about mid-1936.

As southern gospel developed, Columbia had astutely sought to record the artists associated with the emerging genre; for example, Columbia was the only company to record Charles Davis Tillman. Most fortuitously for Columbia in its Depression Era financial woes, in 1936 the company entered into an exclusive recording contract with the Chuck Wagon Gang, a hugely successful relationship which continued into the 1970s. A signature group of southern gospel, the Chuck Wagon Gang became Columbia's bestsellers with at least 37 million records, many of them through the aegis of the Mull Singing Convention of the Air sponsored on radio (and later television) by southern gospel broadcaster J. Bazzel Mull (1914–2006).

In 1935, Herbert M. Greenspon, an 18-year-old shipping clerk, led a committee to organize the first trade union shop at the main manufacturing factory in Bridgeport, Connecticut. Elected as president of the Congress of Industrial Unions (CIO) local, Greenspon negotiated the first contract between factory workers and Columbia management. In a career with Columbia that lasted 30 years, Greenspon retired after achieving the position of executive vice president of the company. Columbia also hired talent scout, music writer, producer, and impresario John Hammond in 1937. Alongside his significance as a discoverer, promoter, and producer of jazz, blues, and folk artists during the swing music era, Hammond had already been of great help to Columbia in 1932–33. Through his involvement in the UK music paper Melody Maker, Hammond had arranged for the struggling US Columbia label to provide recordings for the UK Columbia label, mostly using the specially created Columbia W-265000 matrix series. Hammond recorded Fletcher Henderson, Benny Carter, Joe Venuti, Roger Wolfe Kahn and other jazz performers during a time when the economy was bad enough that many of them would not have had the opportunity to enter a studio and play real jazz (a handful of these in this special series were issued in the US).

Hammond's work for Columbia was interrupted by his service during World War II, and he had less involvement with the music scene during the bebop era, but when he returned to work as a talent scout for Columbia in the 1950s, his career proved to be of incalculable historical and cultural importance – the list of superstar artists he would discover and sign to Columbia over the course of his career included Charlie Christian, Count Basie, Teddy Wilson, Pete Seeger, Bob Dylan, Leonard Cohen, Aretha Franklin, Bruce Springsteen and Stevie Ray Vaughan, and in the early 1960s Hammond would also exert a significant cultural effect on the emerging rock music scene due to his championing of reissue LPs of the music of blues artists Robert Johnson and Bessie Smith.

By 1937–38, the record business in America was finally recovering from the near-death blow of the Great Depression, at least for RCA Victor and Decca, but privately, there were doubts about the survival of ARC. In a 1941 court case brought by unhappy shareholders of Columbia Broadcasting System, Inc. ("CBS"), Edward Wallerstein, a high executive with RCA Victor from 1932 thru 1938, was asked to comment on ARC. "The chief value was that the record industry had come back tremendously, especially in the case of two other record companies; and the American Record Company, with all its facilities, had not, so far as I could learn, increased its business in any degree at all in the previous six years."

=== CBS takes over (1938–1947) ===
On December 17, 1938, the ARC, including the Columbia label in the U.S., was acquired by William S. Paley of the Columbia Broadcasting System, Inc. for US$700,000, ten times the price ARC paid in 1934, which would later spark lawsuits by disgruntled shareholders. (Columbia Records had originally co-founded CBS in 1927 along with New York talent agent Arthur Judson, but soon cashed out of the partnership leaving only the name; Paley acquired the fledgling radio network in 1928.) On January 3, 1939, Wallerstein left RCA Victor to become president of the CBS phonograph subsidiary, a position he would hold for twelve years. CBS kept the ARC name for three months. then on April 4, it amended the New York Department of State record of "Columbia Phonograph Company, Inc.," naming several of its own employees to directorships, and announced in a press release, "The American Record Co. tag is discarded". Columbia Records was actually reborn on May 22, 1939, as "Columbia Recording Corporation, Inc.", a Delaware corporation. The NYDOS shows a later incorporation date of April 4, 1947. This corporation changed its name to Columbia Records, Inc. on October 11, 1954, and reverted to Columbia Recording Corporation on January 2, 1962. The Columbia trademark remained under Columbia Records, Inc. of Delaware, filed back in 1929. Brothers Ike and Leon Levy owned stakes in CBS.

In February 1939, NYC Studios moved from ARC headquarters at 1776 Broadway, to 799 7th Avenue, 6th&7th flrs, New York City ("Studio A"). Corporate offices, studio and Pressing Plant would also continue at 1473 Barnum Avenue, Bridgeport, Connecticut. John Hammond was hired by Wallerstein as "Associate Director Popular Recording" (at 7th Ave). Another executive from ARC, Art Satherley, was not expected to transition over as easily. "It is understood that CBS and the Levys are not interested in retaining American Record's hillbilly department, and that Art Satherly, who has been running this section for many years, will take it out of the company with him". Fortunately, to the delight of many, this did not happen, and Art went on to many more successful years supervising all aspects of Columbia's Hillbilly/Country artists and sessions.

On August 30, 1939, Columbia replaced its $.75 Brunswick record for a $.50 Columbia label. Brunswick was gradually phased out, the final issue being Brunswick 8520, in April 1940. Wallerstein and Paley knew in advance that their course of action would lead to violation of the 1931 Brunswick lease agreement, so they discontinued Vocalion in June 1940, and fired up Okeh. By July, it was releasing new Hillbilly platters by Gene Autry and Bob Wills, and re-issuing past Vocalion discs, using the same catalogue numbers with a leading zero added. When a January 1941 audit found that not more than 150,000 Brunswick records had sold during the period from December 1, 1939, through December 31, 1940, control of the loaned trademarks and catalog of master recordings made prior to December 3, 1931, reverted to Warner Bros. Pictures.

The Columbia trademark from this point until the late 1950s was two overlapping circles with the Magic Notes in the left circle and a CBS microphone in the right circle. The Royal Blue labels were dropped in favor of a deep red, which caused RCA Victor to claim infringement on its famous Red Seal trademark (RCA lost the case). The blue Columbia label was retained for its classical music Columbia Masterworks Records series until it was later changed to a green label before switching to a gray label in the late 1950s, and then to the bronze that is familiar to owners of Columbia/CBS classical and Broadway albums. Columbia Phonograph Company of Canada did not survive the Great Depression, so CBS made a distribution deal with Sparton Records in 1939 to release Columbia records in Canada under the Columbia name.

During the 1940s, Frank Sinatra recorded for Columbia and helped to substantially boost the company's revenue. Sinatra recorded over 200 songs for Columbia which include his most popular songs from his early years. Other popular artists on Columbia at this time included Benny Goodman (signed from RCA Victor in 1939), Count Basie, Jimmie Lunceford (both signed from Decca), Eddy Duchin, Ray Noble (both moved to Columbia from Brunswick), Kate Smith, Mildred Bailey, and Will Bradley.

In 1947, the company was renamed Columbia Records Inc. and founded its Mexican record company, Discos Columbia de Mexico. 1948 saw the first classical LP Nathan Milstein's recording of the Mendelssohn Violin Concerto. Columbia's new 33 rpm format quickly spelled the death of the classical 78 rpm record and for the first time in nearly fifty years, gave Columbia a commanding lead over RCA Victor Red Seal.

=== The LP record (1948–1959) ===
Columbia's president Edward Wallerstein was instrumental in steering Paley towards the ARC purchase. He set his talents to his goal of hearing an entire movement of a symphony on one side of an album. Ward Botsford writing for the Twenty-Fifth Anniversary Issue of High Fidelity Magazine relates: "He was no inventor—he was simply a man who seized an idea whose time was ripe and begged, ordered, and cajoled a thousand men into bringing into being the now accepted medium of the record business." Despite Wallerstein's stormy tenure, in June 1948, Columbia introduced the Long Playing "microgroove" LP record format (sometimes written "Lp" in early advertisements), which rotated at 33⅓ revolutions per minute, to be the standard for the gramophone record for forty years. CBS research director Dr. Peter Goldmark played a managerial role in the collaborative effort, but Wallerstein credits engineer William Savory with the technical prowess that brought the long-playing disc to the public.

By the early 1940s, Columbia had been experimenting with higher fidelity recordings, and longer masters, which paved the way for the successful release of the LPs in 1948. One such record that helped set a new standard for music listeners was the 10" LP reissue of The Voice of Frank Sinatra, originally released on March 4, 1946, as an album of four 78 rpm records, which was the first pop album issued in the new LP format. Sinatra was arguably Columbia's hottest commodity and his artistic vision combined with the direction Columbia were taking the medium of music, both popular and classic, were well suited. The Voice of Frank Sinatra was also considered to be the first genuine concept album. Since the term "LP" has come to refer to the 12-inch 33 1/3 rpm vinyl disk, the first LP is the Mendelssohn Violin Concerto in E minor played by Nathan Milstein with Bruno Walter conducting the New York Philharmonic (then called the Philharmonic-Symphony Orchestra of New York), Columbia ML 4001, found in the Columbia Record Catalog for 1949, published in July 1948. The other "LP's" listed in the catalog were in the 10 inch format starting with ML 2001 for the light classics, CL 6001 for popular songs and JL 8001 for children's records. The Library of Congress in Washington DC now holds the Columbia Records Paperwork Archive which shows the Label order for ML 4001 being written on March 1, 1948. One can infer that Columbia was pressing the first LPs for distribution to their dealers for at least 3 months prior to the introduction of the LP on June 21, 1948. The catalog numbering system has had minor changes ever since.

Columbia's LPs were particularly well-suited to classical music's longer pieces, so some of the early albums featured such artists as Eugene Ormandy and the Philadelphia Orchestra, Bruno Walter and the New York Philharmonic Orchestra, and Sir Thomas Beecham and the Royal Philharmonic Orchestra. The success of these recordings persuaded Capitol Records to begin releasing LPs in 1949. Even before the LP record was officially demonstrated, Columbia offered to share the new speed with rival RCA Victor, who initially rejected it and soon introduced their new competitive 45 RPM record. When it became clear that the LP was the preferred format for classical recordings, RCA Victor announced that the company would begin releasing its own LPs in January 1950. This was quickly followed by the other major American labels. Decca Records in the U.K. was the first to release LPs in Europe, beginning in 1949. EMI would not fully adopt the LP format until 1955.

An "original cast recording" of Rodgers & Hammerstein's South Pacific with Ezio Pinza and Mary Martin was recorded in 1949. Both conventional metal masters and tape were used in the sessions in New York City. For some reason, the taped version was not used until Sony released it as part of a set of CDs devoted to Columbia's Broadway albums. Over the years, Columbia joined Decca and RCA Victor in specializing in albums devoted to Broadway musicals with members of the original casts. In the 1950s, Columbia also began releasing LPs drawn from the soundtracks of popular films.

Many album covers put together by Columbia and the other major labels were put together using one piece of cardboard (folded in half) and two paper "slicks", one for the front and one for the back. The front slick bent around the top, bottom, and left sides (the right side is open for the record to be inserted into the cover) and glued the two halves of cardboard together at the top and bottom. The back slick is pasted over the edges of the pasted-on front slick to make it appear that the album cover is one continuous piece.

Columbia discovered that printing two front cover slicks, one for mono and one for stereo, was inefficient and therefore needlessly costly. Starting in the summer of 1959 with some of the albums released in August, they went to the "paste-over" front slick, which had the stereo information printed on the top and the mono information printed on the bottom. For stereo issues, they moved the front slick down so the stereo information was showing at the top, and the mono information was bent around the bottom to the back and "pasted over" by the back slick. Conversely, for a mono album, they moved the slick up so the mono information showed at the bottom, and the stereo information was pasted over. Soon, other record companies had adopted the paste-over method.

=== 1950s ===
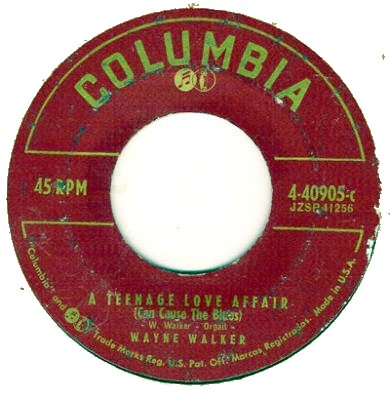
Columbia used this label for its 45 r.p.m. records from 1951 until 1958.

Transitional 1955 promo 45 r.p.m. label showing both the old notes and mike and new walking eye logos

In 1951, Columbia US began issuing records in the 45 rpm format RCA Victor had introduced two years earlier. The same year, Ted Wallerstein retired as Columbia Records chairman; and Columbia US also severed its decades-long distribution arrangement with EMI and signed a distribution deal with Philips Records to market Columbia recordings outside North America. EMI continued to distribute Okeh and later Epic label recordings until 1968. EMI also continued to distribute Columbia recordings in Australia and New Zealand. American Columbia was not happy with EMI's reluctance to introduce long playing records.

Columbia became the most successful non-rock record company in the 1950s, after it lured producer and bandleader Mitch Miller away from the Mercury label in 1950. Despite its many successes, Columbia remained largely uninvolved in the teenage rock'n'roll market until the mid-1960s, despite a handful of crossover hits, largely because of Miller's frequently expressed loathing of rock'n'roll. (Miller was a classically trained oboist who had been a friend of Columbia executive Goddard Lieberson since their days at the Eastman School of Music in the 1930s.) Miller quickly signed up Mercury's biggest artist at the time, Frankie Laine, and discovered several of the decade's biggest recording stars including Tony Bennett, Mahalia Jackson, Jimmy Boyd, Guy Mitchell (whose stage surname was taken from Miller's first name), Johnnie Ray, the Four Lads, Rosemary Clooney, Kay Lande, Ray Conniff, Jerry Vale and Johnny Mathis. He also oversaw many of the early singles by the label's top female recording star of the decade, Doris Day.

In 1953, Columbia formed a new subsidiary label Epic Records. 1954 saw Columbia end its distribution arrangement with Sparton Records and form Columbia Records of Canada. To enhance its country music stable, which already included Marty Robbins, Ray Price and Carl Smith, Columbia bid $15,000 for Elvis Presley's contract from Sun Records in 1955. Presley's manager, Colonel Tom Parker, turned down their offer and signed Presley with RCA Victor. However, Columbia did sign two Sun artists in 1958: Johnny Cash and Carl Perkins.

With 1954, Columbia U.S. decisively broke with its past when it introduced its new, modernist-style "Walking Eye" logo, designed by Columbia's art director S. Neil Fujita. This logo actually depicts a stylus (the legs) on a record (the eye); however, the "eye" also subtly refers to CBS's main business in television, and that division's iconic Eye logo. Columbia continued to use the "notes and mike" logo on record labels and even used a promo label showing both logos until the "notes and mike" was phased out (along with the 78 in the US) in 1958. In Canada, Columbia 78s were pressed with the "Walking Eye" logo in 1958. The original Walking Eye was tall and solid; it was modified in 1961 to the familiar one still used today (pictured on this page), despite the fact that the Walking Eye was used only sporadically during most of the 1990s.

Although the big band era had passed, Columbia had Duke Ellington under contract for several years, capturing the historic moment when Ellington's band provoked a post-midnight frenzy (followed by international headlines) at the 1956 Newport Jazz Festival, which proved a boost to a bandleader whose career had stalled. Under new head producer George Avakian, Columbia became the most vital label to the general public's appreciation and understanding (with help from Avakian's prolific and perceptive play-by-play liner notes) of jazz, releasing a series of LPs by Louis Armstrong, but also signing to long-term contracts Dave Brubeck and Miles Davis, the two modern jazz artists who would in 1959 record albums that remain among the best-selling jazz albums by any label, Time Out by the Brubeck Quartet and Kind of Blue by the Davis Sextet, which, in 2003, appeared as number 12 in Rolling Stone's list of the "500 Greatest Albums Of All Time". With another producer, Teo Macero, Columbia cemented contracts with jazz composer/musicians Thelonious Monk and Charles Mingus, while Macero became a significant figure in Miles Davis career from an explorer of the art of modal jazz from Davis' sextets 1958 album Milestones to innovator and avatar of the marriage of jazz with rock and electronic sounds commonly known as jazz fusion. Although the big band era had declined, Columbia maintained Duke Ellington under contract for several years, documenting the notable performance at the 1956 Newport Jazz Festival when Ellington’s band drew significant attention and renewed interest in his career. Under producer George Avakian, Columbia played an important role in shaping public appreciation of jazz, releasing LPs by Louis Armstrong and signing Dave Brubeck and Miles Davis to long-term contracts. In 1959, both artists recorded albums that became enduring best-sellers: Time Out by the Brubeck Quartet and Kind of Blue by the Davis Sextet, the latter later ranked number 12 in Rolling Stone’s 2003 list of the “500 Greatest Albums of All Time.” With producer Teo Macero, Columbia also secured contracts with Thelonious Monk and Charles Mingus. Macero’s collaboration with Miles Davis was particularly influential, spanning from the 1958 album Milestones through Davis’ later work that integrated jazz with rock and electronic elements, contributing to the development of jazz fusion.

In 1954, Columbia embraced small-group modern jazz by signing of the Dave Brubeck Quartet, which resulted in the release of the on-location, best-selling jazz album (up to this time), Jazz Goes to College. Contemporaneously with Columbia's first release of modern jazz by a small group, which was also the Brubeck Quartet's debut on the label, was a Time magazine cover story on the phenomenon of Brubeck's success on college campuses. The humble Dave Brubeck demurred, saying that the second Time cover story on a jazz musician (the first featured Louis Armstrong's picture) had been earned by Duke Ellington, not himself. Within two years Ellington's picture would appear on the cover of Time, following his success at the 1956 Newport Jazz Festival. Ellington at Newport, recorded on Columbia, was also the bandleader-composer-pianist's best-selling album. Moreover, this exclusive trinity of jazz giants featured on the cover of Time magazine were all Columbia artists. (In the early 1960s Columbia jazz artist Thelonious Monk would be afforded the same honor.)

Columbia changed distributors in Australia and New Zealand in 1956, when the Australian Record Company picked up distribution of U.S. Columbia product to replace the Capitol Records product which ARC lost when EMI bought Capitol. As EMI owned the Columbia trademark at that time, the U.S. Columbia material was issued in Australia and New Zealand on the Coronet Records label.

In the same year, former Columbia A&R manager Goddard Lieberson was promoted to president of the entire CBS recording division, which included Columbia and Epic, and the company's various international divisions and licensees. Under his leadership the corporation's music division soon overtook RCA Victor as the top recording company in the world, with a roster of artists and a catalogue of popular, jazz, classical and stage and screen soundtrack titles. Lieberson, who had joined Columbia as an A&R manager in 1938, oversaw the release of many successful albums and singles, and championing prestige releases that sold relatively poorly, and even some titles that had limited appeal, such as complete editions of the works of Arnold Schoenberg and Anton von Webern. One of his first major successes was the original Broadway cast album of My Fair Lady, which sold over 5 million copies worldwide in 1957, becoming the most successful LP ever released up to that time. Lieberson also convinced long-serving CBS president William S. Paley to become the sole backer of the original Broadway production, a $500,000 investment which subsequently earned the company some $32 million in profits.

In October 1958, Columbia, in time for the Christmas season, put out a series of "Greatest Hits" packages by such artists as Johnny Mathis, Doris Day, Guy Mitchell, Johnnie Ray, Jo Stafford, Tony Bennett, Rosemary Clooney, Frankie Laine and the Four Lads; months later, it put out another Mathis compilation and that of Marty Robbins. Only Mathis' compilations charted, since there were only 25 positions on Billboard's album charts at the time. However, the compilations were so successful that they led to Columbia doing such packages on a widespread basis, usually when an artist's career was in decline.

==== Stereo ====
Although Columbia began recording in stereo in 1956, stereo LPs did not begin to be manufactured until 1958. One of Columbia's first stereo releases was an abridged and re-structured performance of Handel's Messiah by the New York Philharmonic and the Westminster Choir conducted by Leonard Bernstein (recorded on December 31, 1956, on 1/2-inch tape, using an Ampex 300-3 machine). Bernstein combined the Nativity and Resurrection sections, and ended the performance with the death of Christ. As with RCA Victor, most of the early stereo recordings were of classical artists, including the New York Philharmonic Orchestra conducted by Bruno Walter, Dimitri Mitropoulos, and Leonard Bernstein, and the Philadelphia Orchestra conducted by Eugene Ormandy, who also recorded an abridged Messiah for Columbia. Some sessions were made with the Columbia Symphony Orchestra, an ensemble drawn from leading New York musicians, which had first made recordings with Sir Thomas Beecham in 1949 in Columbia's New York City studios. George Szell and the Cleveland Orchestra recorded mostly for Epic. When Epic dropped classical music, the roster and catalogue was moved to Columbia Masterworks Records.

Columbia released its first pop stereo albums in the summer of 1958. All of the first dozen or so were stereo versions of albums already available in mono. It was not until September 1958, that Columbia began simultaneous mono/stereo releases. Mono versions of otherwise stereo recordings were discontinued in 1968. To celebrate the 10th anniversary of the introduction of the LP, in 1958 Columbia initiated the "Adventures in Sound" series that showcased music from around the world.

As far as the catalog numbering system went, there was no correlation between mono and stereo versions for the first few years. Columbia started a new CS 8000 series for pop stereo releases, and figuring the stereo releases as some sort of specialty niche records, didn't bother to link the mono and stereo numbers for two years. Masterworks classical LPs had an MS 6000 series, while showtunes albums on Masterworks were OS 2000. Finally, in 1960, the pop stereo series jumped from 8300 to 8310 to match Lambert, Hendricks & Ross Sing Ellington, the Lambert, Hendricks & Ross album issued as CL-1510. From that point, the stereo numbers on pop albums were exactly 6800 higher than the mono; stereo classical albums were the mono number plus 600; and showtunes releases were the mono number MINUS 3600. Only the last two digits in the respective catalog series' matched.

Pop stereo LPs got into the high 9000s by 1970, when CBS Records revamped and unified its catalog numbering system across all its labels. Masterworks classical albums were in the 7000s, while showtunes stayed in the low 2000s.

Columbia's engineering department developed a process for emulating stereo from a mono source. They called this process "Electronically Rechanneled for Stereo". In the June 16, 1962, issue of Billboard magazine (page 5), Columbia announced it would issue "rechanneled" versions of greatest hits compilations that had been recorded in mono, including albums by Doris Day, Frankie Laine, Percy Faith, Mitch Miller, Marty Robbins, Dave Brubeck, Miles Davis, and Johnny Mathis.

=== The 1960s ===
==== Outing of "deep groove" ====
By the latter half of 1961, Columbia started using pressing plants with newer equipment. The "deep groove" pressings were made on older pressing machines, where the groove was an artifact of the metal stamper being affixed to a round center "block" to assure the resulting record would be centered. Newer machines used parts with a slightly different geometry, that only left a small "ledge" where the deep groove used to be. This changeover did not happen all at once, as different plants replaced machines at different times, leaving the possibility that both deep groove and ledge varieties could be original pressings. The changeover took place starting in late 1961.

==== CBS Records ====
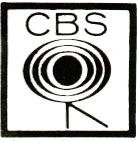
The CBS Records logo used outside of the United States

In 1961, CBS ended its arrangement with Philips Records and formed its own international organization, CBS Records International, in 1962. This subsidiary label released Columbia recordings outside the US and Canada on the CBS label (until 1964 marketed by Philips in Britain). The recordings could not be released under the Columbia Records name because EMI operated a separate record label by that name, Columbia Graphophone Company, outside North America. This was the result of legal maneuvers which led to the creation of EMI in the early 1930s.

While this happened, starting in late 1961, both the mono and the stereo labels of domestic Columbia releases started carrying a small "CBS" at the top of the label. This was not something that changed at a certain date, but rather, pressing plants were told to use up the stock of old (pre-CBS) labels first, resulting in a mixture of labels for some given releases. Some are known with the CBS text on mono albums, and not on stereo of the same album, and vice versa; diggings brought up pressings with the CBS text on one side and not on the other. Many, but certainly not all, of the early numbers with the "ledge" variation (i.e., no deep groove), had the small "CBS". This text would be used on the Columbia labels until June 1962.

Columbia's Mexican unit, Discos Columbia, was renamed Discos CBS.

With the formation of CBS Records International, CBS started establishing its own distribution in the early 1960s, beginning in Australia. In 1960 CBS took over its distributor in Australia and New Zealand, the Australian Record Company (founded in 1936) including Coronet Records, one of the leading Australian independent recording and distribution companies of the day. The CBS Coronet label was replaced by the CBS label with the 'walking eye' logo in 1963. ARC continued trading under that name until the late 1970s when it formally changed its business name to CBS Australia.

==== Mitch Miller on television ====
In 1961, Columbia's music repertoire was given an enormous boost when Mitch Miller, its A&R manager and bandleader, became the host of the variety series Sing Along with Mitch on NBC. The show was based on Miller's 'folksy' but appealing 'chorus' style performance of popular standards. During its four-season run, the series promoted Miller's "Singalong" albums, which sold over 20 million units, and received a 34% audience share when it was cancelled in 1964.

==== Bob Dylan ====
In September 1961, CBS A&R manager John Hammond was producing the first Columbia album by folk singer Carolyn Hester, who invited a friend to accompany her on one of the recording sessions. It was here that Hammond first met Bob Dylan, whom he signed to the label, initially as a harmonica player. Dylan's self-titled debut album was released in March 1962 and sold only moderately. Some executives in Columbia dubbed Dylan "Hammond's folly" and suggested that Dylan be dropped from the label. But John Hammond and Johnny Cash defended Dylan, who over the next four years became one of Columbia's highest earning acts.

Over the course of the 1960s, Dylan achieved a prominent position in Columbia. His early folk songs were recorded by many acts and became hits for Peter, Paul & Mary and the Turtles. Some of these cover versions became the foundation of the folk rock genre. The Byrds achieved their pop breakthrough with a version of Dylan's "Mr. Tambourine Man". In 1965, Dylan's controversial decision to 'go electric' and work with rock musicians divided his audience but catapulted him to greater commercial success with his 1965 hit single "Like a Rolling Stone". Following his withdrawal from touring in 1966, Dylan recorded a large group of songs with his backing group the Band which reached other artists as 'demo recordings'. These resulted in hits by Manfred Mann ("The Mighty Quinn") and Julie Driscoll & Brian Auger and the Trinity ("This Wheel's On Fire"). Dylan's late 1960s albums John Wesley Harding and Nashville Skyline became cornerstone recordings of the emergent country rock genre and influenced the Byrds and the Flying Burrito Brothers.

==== Rock and roll ====
When the British Invasion arrived in January 1964, Columbia had no rock musicians on its roster except for Dion, who was signed in 1963 as the label's first major rock star, and Paul Revere & the Raiders who were also signed in 1963. The label released a merseybeat album, The Exciting New Liverpool Sound (Columbia CL-2172, issued in mono only). Terry Melcher, son of Doris Day, produced the hard driving "Don't Make My Baby Blue" for Frankie Laine, who had gone six years without a hit record. The song reached No. 51 on the pop chart and No. 17 on the easy listening chart.

Melcher and Bruce Johnston discovered and brought to Columbia the Rip Chords, a vocal group consisting of Ernie Bringas and Phil Stewart, and turned it into a rock group through production techniques. The group had hits in "Here I Stand", a remake of the song by Wade Flemons, and "Hey Little Cobra". Columbia saw the two recordings as a start to getting into rock and roll. Melcher and Johnston recorded several additional singles for Columbia in 1964 as "Bruce & Terry" and later as "The Rogues". Melcher produced early albums by the Byrds and Paul Revere & the Raiders for Columbia while Johnston produced the Beach Boys for Capitol Records.

==== Ascension of Clive Davis ====
When Mitch Miller retired in 1965, Columbia was at a turning point. Miller's disdain for rock and roll and pop rock had dominated Columbia's A&R policy. Sales of Broadway soundtracks and Mitch Miller's singalong series were waning. Pretax earnings had flattened to about $5 million annually. The label's only significant "pop" acts at the time were Bob Dylan, the Byrds, Paul Revere & the Raiders and Simon & Garfunkel. In its catalogue were other genres: classical, jazz and country, along with a select group of R&B artists, among them Aretha Franklin. Most historians observed that Columbia had problems marketing Franklin as a major talent in the R&B genre, which led to her leaving the label for Atlantic Records in 1967.

In 1967, Brooklyn-born lawyer Clive Davis became president of Columbia. Following the appointment of Davis, the Columbia label became more of a rock music label, thanks mainly to Davis's fortuitous decision to attend the Monterey International Pop Festival, where he spotted and signed several leading acts including Janis Joplin. Joplin led the way for several generations of female rock and rollers. However, Columbia/CBS still had a hand in traditional pop and jazz and one of its key acquisitions during this period was Barbra Streisand. She released her first solo album on Columbia in 1963 and remains with the label to this day. Additionally, the label kept Miles Davis on the roster, and his late 1960s recordings, In a Silent Way and Bitches Brew, pioneered a fusion of jazz and rock music.

A San Francisco group called Moby Grape had been gaining popularity on the West Coast, and were signed by Davis in 1967. As a way of introducing them to the world with a splash, they released their debut album, along with five singles from the album, all on the same day, June 6, 1967, 23 years following D-Day. The album hit made No. 24 on the Billboard 200, but the singles barely made a dent in the charts, the best performer being "Omaha", which lasted a mere three weeks on the Hot 100 reaching only No. 88. The other charter, "Hey Grandma", only reached the Bubbling Under chart and faded within a week. Also, there were some complaints about the obscene gesture made to the American flag on the front cover that had to be edited out on the second pressing, not to mention that the group started to decline in sales after that. The return on all the promotional budget for the singles realized nothing.

==== Simon & Garfunkel ====
After Dylan, Columbia's most commercially successful pop act of this period was Simon & Garfunkel. The duo scored a surprise No. 1 hit in 1965 after Columbia producer Tom Wilson, inspired by the folk-rock experiments of Dylan, The Byrds, and others, added drums and bass to the duo's recording of "The Sound of Silence" without their knowledge or approval. Indeed, the duo had broken up some months earlier, discouraged by the poor sales of their debut LP, and Paul Simon had moved to the UK; he learned of his hit single through the music press. The song's dramatic success prompted Simon to return to the US; the duo reformed, and they soon became one of the flagship acts of the folk rock boom of the mid-1960s. Their next album, Parsley, Sage, Rosemary and Thyme, went to No. 4 on the Billboard album chart. The duo subsequently had a Top 20 single, "A Hazy Shade of Winter", but progress slowed during 1966–67 as Simon struggled with writer's block and the demands of constant touring. They shot back to the top in 1968 after Simon agreed to write songs for the Mike Nichols film The Graduate. The resulting single, "Mrs. Robinson", became a smash hit. Both The Graduate soundtrack and Simon & Garfunkel's next studio album, Bookends, were major hits on the album chart, with combined total sales in excess of five million copies. Simon and Garfunkel's fifth and final studio album, Bridge over Troubled Water (1970), reached number one in the US album charts in January 1970 and became one of the most successful albums of all time.

==== Hoyt Axton and Tom Rush ====
Davis lured artists Hoyt Axton and Tom Rush to Columbia in 1969, and both were given what was known as "the pop treatment" by the label. Hoyt Axton had been a folk/blues singer-songwriter since the early 1960s, when he made several albums for Horizon, then Vee-Jay. By the time he joined Columbia, he had mixed successful pop songs like "Greenback Dollar", with hard rock songs for Steppenwolf, such as "The Pusher", which was used in the film Easy Rider in the same year. When he landed at Columbia, his album My Griffin Is Gone was described as "the poster child for 'overproduced,' full of all kinds of instruments and even strings". After that album, Axton left and joined Capitol Records, where his next albums contained "Joy to the World" and "Never Been to Spain", which became hits for Three Dog Night on Dunhill. Axton eventually became a country singer, and founded his own record label, Jeremiah.

Tom Rush had always been the "storyteller" or "balladeer" type of folk artist, before and after his stint with Columbia, to which Rush was lured from Elektra. As with Axton, Rush was given "the treatment" on his self-titled Columbia debut. The multitude of instruments added to his usual solo guitar were all done "tastefully", of course, but was not really on par with Rush's audience expectations. He commented to record label historian Mike Callahan:

Well, when you're in the studio, they bring out all these "sweeteners" and things they have, and while you're there, you say, yeah, that sounds good. But then you get the album home and you almost can't hear yourself under all that.

Eventually, Rush returned to his usual sound (which he applied to his next three albums for Columbia) and has been playing to audiences ever since.

=== The 1970s ===
==== Catalog numbers ====
The Columbia album series began in 1951 with album GL-500 (CL-500) and reached an awkward milestone in 1970, when the stereo numbering sequence reached CS-9999, assigned to the Patti Page album Honey Come Back. This presented a catalog numbering system challenge as Columbia had used a four-digit catalog number for 13 years, and CS-10000 seemed cumbersome. Columbia decided to start issuing albums at CS-1000 instead, preserving the four-digit catalog number. However, this resulted in the reuse of numbers previously used in 1957–58, although the prefix was now different. In July 1970, the cataloging department implemented a new system, combining all their labels into a unified catalog numbering system starting with 30000, with the prefix letter indicating the label: C for Columbia, E for Epic, H for Harmony (budget reissue line), M for Columbia Masterworks, S for movie soundtrack and original Broadway cast albums, Y for Columbia Odyssey, and Z for every other label that CBS distributed (collectively referred to as CBS Associated). The prefix letter G was also used for two album sets—or the number of records in the set after the label letter, such as KC2. The first CBS album released under the new system was The Elvin Bishop Group's self-titled album on Fillmore Records, assigned with F 30001 (the earliest Fillmore albums had the 'F' prefix, rather than a 'Z'), while the first actual Columbia release under the system was Herschel Bernardi's Show Stopper, assigned with C 30004. The highest catalog number released in the old system was CS-1069, assigned to The Sesame Street Book and Record. Chronologically, Columbia issued at least one album in this series in August, but by that time, the CBS Consolidated 30000 series, which started issuing albums in July with the new label design, was well underway, having issued nearly 100 albums. The system was later expanded with even more prefix letters (including R and V for Portrait, A and W for Special Products, L for Sony Wonder, S for Sony Classical, N for Monument, O for Chaos Recordings, and B for 550 Music), which continued until 2005.

In September 1970, under the guidance of Clive Davis, Columbia Records entered the West Coast rock market, opening a state-of-the art recording studio (which was located at 827 Folsom St. in San Francisco and later morphed into the Automatt) and establishing an A&R head and office in San Francisco at Fisherman's Wharf, headed by George Daly, a producer and artist for Monument Records (who signed a distribution deal with Columbia at the time) and a former bandmate of Nils Lofgren and Roy Buchanan. The recording studio operated under CBS until 1978.

==== Quadraphonic Sound ====
During 1971 Columbia began producing records in four-channel quadraphonic sound, using the "SQ Quadraphonic" matrix decoding system. These recordings were backward compatible on conventional two-channel stereo playback systems, but played four-channels of surround sound when heard with special amplifiers and additional speakers. Artists using this technology covered all genres, including classical music Leonard Bernstein and Pierre Boulez, plus popular artists such as Electric Light Orchestra, Billy Joel, Pink Floyd, Johnny Cash, Barbra Streisand, Ray Conniff, Santana, Herbie Hancock, and Blue Öyster Cult. RCA had already begun releasing quadraphonic recordings on 8-track tape starting in 1970, and countered on LP record with the Quadradisc system. The RCA process required a special phono cartridge for "discrete" four-channel playback unlike the Columbia "matrix" system. Although the Columbia process was simpler and quite effective, many consumers were confused by competing systems and sales of both were disappointing. Columbia released its last quadraphonic recordings in 1978. Starting in the 1990s multichannel surround sound music surged again with the popularity of home cinema systems. Many quadraphonic recordings were reissued in new surround sound formats such as Dolby Digital, DTS, Super Audio CD and Blu-ray, however, multichannel music still did not reach mass-market acceptance.

==== Yetnikoff becomes president ====
In 1975, Walter Yetnikoff was promoted to become president of Columbia Records, and his vacated position as president of CBS Records International was filled by Dick Asher. At this point, according to music historian Fredric Dannen, the shy and introverted Yetnikoff began to transform his personality, becoming (in Asher's words) "wild, menacing, crude, and above all, very loud". In Dannen's view, Yetnikoff was probably over-compensating for his naturally sensitive and generous personality, and that he had little hope of being recognised as a "record man" (someone with a musical ear and an intuitive understanding of current trends and artists' intentions) because he was tone-deaf, so he instead determined to become a "colourful character". Yetnikoff soon became notorious for his violent temper and regular tantrums: "He shattered glassware, spewed a mixture of Yiddish and barnyard epithets, and had people physically ejected from the CBS building."

In 1976, Columbia Records of Canada was renamed CBS Records Canada Ltd. The Columbia label continued to be used by CBS Canada, but the CBS label was introduced for French-language recordings. On May 5, 1979, Columbia Masterworks began digital recording in a recording session of Stravinsky's Petrouchka by the New York Philharmonic Orchestra, conducted by Zubin Mehta, in New York (using 3M's 32-channel multitrack digital recorder).

==== Dick Asher vs "The Network" ====
CBS Records had a popular roster of musicians. It distributed Philadelphia International Records, Blue Sky Records, the Isley Brothers' T-Neck Records and Monument Records (from 1971 to 1976). But the music industry was in financial decline. Total sales fell by 11%, the biggest drop since World War II. In 1979, CBS had a pre-tax income of $51 million and sales of over $1 billion. The label laid off hundreds of employees.

To deal with the crisis, CEO John Backe promoted Dick Asher from vice president of Business Affairs to deputy president. Charged with cutting costs and restoring profits, Asher was reportedly reluctant to take on the role. He was worried that Yetnikoff would resent his promotion. But Backe had confidence in Asher's experience. In 1972, Asher had turned the British division of CBS from loss to profit. Backe considered him to be honest and trustworthy, and he appealed to Asher's loyalty to the company. Employees at CBS thought Asher was a bore and an interloper. He cut back on expenses and on perks like limousines and restaurants. His relationship with Yetnikoff deteriorated.

Asher became increasingly concerned about the huge and rapidly growing cost of hiring independent agents, who were paid to promote new singles to radio station program directors. "Indies" had been used by record labels for many years to promote new releases, but as he methodically delved into CBS Records' expenses, Asher was dismayed to discover that hiring these independent promoters was now costing CBS alone as much as $10 million per year. When Asher took over CBS UK division in 1972, a freelance promoter might only charge $100 per week, but by 1979 the top American independent promoters had organized themselves into a loose collective known as "The Network", and their fees were now running into the tens millions of dollars per year, Music historian Fredric Dannen estimates that by 1980 the major labels were paying anywhere from to $100,000 to $300,000 per song to the "Network" promoters, and that it was costing the industry as whole as much as $80 million annually.

During this period, Columbia scored a Top 40 hit with the Pink Floyd single "Another Brick in the Wall", and its parent album The Wall would spend four months at No. 1 on the Billboard LP chart in early 1980, but few in the industry knew that Dick Asher was in fact using the single as a covert experiment to test the extent of the pernicious influence of The Network – by not paying them to promote the new Pink Floyd single. The results were immediate and troubling – not one of the major radio stations in Los Angeles would program the record, despite the fact that the group was in town, performing the first seven concerts on their elaborate The Wall Tour at the Los Angeles Memorial Sports Arena to rave reviews and sold-out crowds. Asher was already worried about the growing power of The Network, and the fact it operated entirely outside the control of the label, but he was profoundly dismayed to realize that "The Network" was in effect a huge extortion racket, and that the operation could well be linked to organized crime – a concern vehemently dismissed by Yetnikoff, who resolutely defended the "indies" and declared them to be "mensches". But Dick Asher now knew that The Network's real power lay in their ability to prevent records from being picked up by radio, and as an experienced media lawyer and a loyal CBS employee, he was also acutely aware that this could become a new payola scandal which had the potential to engulf the entire CBS corporation, and that the Federal Communications Commission (FCC) could even revoke CBS' all-important broadcast licenses if the corporation was found to be involved in any illegality.

=== The 1980s and sale to Sony ===
The structure of US Columbia remained the same until 1980, when it spun off the classical/Broadway unit, Columbia Masterworks Records, into a separate imprint, CBS Masterworks Records.

In 1988, the CBS Records Group, including the Columbia Records unit, was acquired by Sony, which re-christened the parent division Sony Music Entertainment in 1991. As Sony only had a temporary license on the CBS Records name, it then acquired the rights to the Columbia trademarks (Columbia Graphophone) outside the U.S., Canada, Spain (trademark owned by BMG) and Japan (Nippon Columbia) from EMI, a firm which generally had not used them since the early 1970s. The CBS Records label was officially renamed Columbia Records on January 1, 1991, worldwide except Spain (where Sony got the rights in 2004 by forming a joint venture with BMG) and Japan. CBS Masterworks Records was renamed Sony Classical Records. In December 2006, CBS Corporation revived the CBS Records name for a new minor label closely linked with its television properties (coincidentally, the new CBS Records is currently distributed by another Sony Music division, RED Distribution).

=== The 1990s–present ===
American talent manager Will Botwin was recruited in 1996 to serve as a senior vice president. In 1998, he was appointed executive vice president/general manager and worked closely with many of the label's established artists, and newer performers such as Microdisney and Five For Fighting. In 2002, Botwin was promoted to president of the Columbia Records Group; he was appointed chairman in 2005. In 2006, he left Columbia to head Red Light Management and its associated ATO Records.

Columbia Records remains a premier subsidiary label of Sony Music Entertainment. In 2009, during the re-consolidation of Sony Music, Columbia was partnered with its Epic Records sister to form the Columbia/Epic Label Group under which it operated as an imprint. In July 2011, as part of further corporate restructuring, Epic was split from the Columbia/Epic Group as Epic took in multiple artists from Jive Records.

As of December 2025, Columbia Records has more than hundred artists, ranging various genres. Some of the artists includes, Addison Rae, Adele, Beyoncé, Billy Joel, Hozier and many more.

As of January 2, 2018, Ron Perry has been named as the chairman and CEO of Columbia Records. In January 2023, Jennifer Mallory was appointed as president.

== Logos and branding ==
The acquisition of rights to the Columbia trademarks by EMI (including the "Magic Notes" logo) presented the company with a dilemma regarding which logo to use. For much of the 1990s, Columbia released its albums with the "walking eye" logo absent, just the "COLUMBIA" word mark in the Bodoni Classic Bold typeface. Columbia experimented with bringing back the "Notes and Mic" logo but without the CBS mark on the microphone. That logo is currently used in the "Columbia Jazz" series of jazz releases and reissues. A modified "Magic Notes" logo is found on the logo for Sony Classical. In mid to late 1999, it was eventually decided that the "Walking Eye" (previously the CBS Records logo outside North America) would be Columbia's logo, with the retained Columbia word mark design, throughout the world except in Japan where Nippon Columbia has the rights to the Columbia trademark to this day and continues to use the "Magic Notes" logo. In Japan, CBS/Sony Records was renamed Sony Records in 1991 and stopped using the "Walking Eye" logo in 1998.

== List of Columbia Records artists ==
In October 2012, there were 85 recording artists signed to Columbia Records. As of December 2025, Columbia Records features 165 artists.

== Subsidiaries ==
- Kemosabe Records
- Small Giant Records
- CloudBoy Records
- Signal Records
- Heavy Muscle
- CMV: Columbia Music Video

== Affiliated labels ==
=== Columbia Label Group (UK) ===
In January 2006, Sony BMG UK split operations into RCA Label Group, mainly dealing with pop and R&B, and Columbia Label Group, mainly dealing with rock, dance and alternative music. Domestic artists include Calvin Harris, George Ezra, Central Cee and Robbie Williams. Subsidiary labels include Ministry of Sound Records and Room Two Recordings.

=== American Recording Company (ARC) ===
In August 1978, Maurice White, founder and leader of the band Earth, Wind & Fire, re-launched the American Recording Company (ARC). Among its artists were R&B and pop singer Deniece Williams, jazz-fusion group Weather Report, and R&B trio the Emotions. Since the 1940s, Columbia has also re-issued thousands of 1930s records issued on ARC labels.

=== Aware Records ===
In 1997, Columbia made an affiliation with the label Aware Records to distribute Aware's artists' music. In 2002, Columbia and Aware accepted the option to continue this relationship.

=== Columbia Nashville ===
In 2007, Columbia formed Columbia Nashville, which is part of Sony Music Nashville. This gave Columbia Nashville complete autonomy and managerial separation from Columbia in New York City. Columbia had given its country music department semi-autonomy for many years and through the 1950s, had a 20,000 series catalog for country music singles while the rest of Columbia's output of singles had a 30,000, then 40,000 series catalog number.

In 2009, Columbia Nashville became part of Sony Music Nashville under the Sony Group Corporation umbrella through Sony Music Group.

== Recording studios ==
Columbia Records operated recording studios, the most notable of which were in New York City, Nashville, Hollywood and San Francisco. Columbia's first recording studio was established in 1913, after the company moved into the Woolworth Building in Manhattan, the tallest building in the world at the time. In 1917, Columbia used this studio to make one of the earliest jazz records, by the Original Dixieland Jass Band.

=== 7th Avenue, New York ===
In 1939, Columbia established Studio A at 799 Seventh Avenue in New York City. This studio – well-known for its use by Bob Dylan in the 1960s – was purchased in 1967 by Jack Arnold and Phil Ramone's A & R Recording, and became Studios A-1 and A-2 for A & R. The building was demolished in 1983 to make way for the Equitable Tower.

=== 52nd Street, New York ===
Studio B and Studio E were located in the CBS Studio Building at 49 East 52nd Street in New York City – on the second and fifth floor, respectively.

=== 30th Street, New York ===
In 1948, Columbia built additional new studios at 207 East 30th Street in Manhattan's Murray Hill district, naming them Studio C and Studio D. This complex, nicknamed "The Church" due to it having been built within an 1875 building that was originally constructed as a Christian church, was considered by some in the music industry to be the best-sounding room of its time, and many consider it to have been the greatest recording studio in history. CBS never took up the option to buy the building outright, giving up its lease and closing the studio in 1981. In spite of the building's inherent heritage status and its cultural significance, it was sold to developers in 1985, demolished, and replaced by a high-rise apartment complex.

=== Columbia Square, Hollywood ===
In 1961, Columbia Records renovated and repurposed CBS Radio Studio A at the company's Columbia Square complex at 6121 Sunset Boulevard in Hollywood, California. Columbia utilized the studio for recording and mastering services until its closure in 1972.

=== Columbia Recording Studios, Chicago ===
Columbia maintained one of its principal recording studios in Chicago (c.1939-c.1974). While under the ownership of CBS Inc., the label’s facilities were always housed alongside the network’s radio and television stations in Chicago (WBBM-AM/FM/TV). Before 1956, the studios operated out of the Wrigley Building; after that year, they moved to 630 North McClurg Court. The site was also commonly known as "CBS Studios, Chicago."

=== Columbia Studios, Nashville ===
In 1962, Columbia Records purchased the Bradley Studios in Nashville, Tennessee (also known as the Quonset Hut), the first recording studio in what would become Nashville's Music Row district when first established by Harold and Owen Bradley in 1954. Renamed Columbia Studios, the company replaced Bradley Studio A with a building containing a newer, larger studio A, mixing and mastering studios, and administrative offices. Columbia operated these studios from 1962 through 1982, when they were converted into office space. Philanthropist Mike Curb bought the structure in 2006 and restored it; it is now a recording classroom for Belmont University's Mike Curb College of Entertainment & Music Business.

=== Liederkranz Hall Studio, New York ===
Columbia also recorded in the highly respected Liederkranz Hall, at 111 East 58th Street between Park and Lexington Avenues, in New York City, it was built by and formerly belonged to a German cultural and musical society, The Liederkranz Society, and used as a recording studio (Victor also recorded in Liederkranz Hall in the late 1920s). The producer Morty Palitz had been instrumental in convincing Columbia Records to begin to use the Liederkranz Hall studio for recording music, additionally convincing the conductor Andre Kostelanetz to make some of the first recordings in Liederkranz Hall which until then had only been used for CBS Symphony radio shows. In 1949, the large Liederkranz Hall space was physically rearranged to create four television studios.

== Executives ==
- Ron Perry, chairman & CEO
- Jenifer Mallory, GM
- Stephen Russo, EVP & CFO
- Abou "Bu" Thiam, EVP
- Edward Wallerstein, chairman & CEO (1939–1951)

== See also ==
- Jim Flora, successor to Alex Steinweiss and legendary illustrator for the label during the 1940s
- List of record labels
- Sony BMG
- Alex Steinweiss, the label's Art Director from 1938 to 1943, inventor of the illustrated album cover and the LP sleeve
