= The Mansion on the Hill =

1997 book

The Mansion on the Hill: Dylan, Young, Geffen, Springsteen, and the Head-On Collision of Rock and Commerce
- Title page for The Mansion on the Hill: Dylan, Young, Geffen, Springsteen, and the Head-On Collision of Rock and Commerce (1997)
- Author: Fred Goodman
- Subject: Rock music
- Published: 1 February 1997
- Publisher: Times Books
- Pages: 431
- ISBN: 0-8129-2113-5

The Mansion on the Hill: Dylan, Young, Geffen, Springsteen, and the Head-On Collision of Rock and Commerce is a book by music and entertainment journalist Fred Goodman. Released on February 1, 1997 via Times Books, the book investigates the rock music industry's ties to commerce and big business.

== Critical reception ==
Kirkus Reviews called the book "an intelligent, honest look at the intersection of rock and business," praising how Goodman "masterfully conveys an incestuous industry of tightly held power" and balances his criticism of "greedy scheming by management" with respect to the "managers, producers, and record executives who made fortunes for themselves and, sometimes, their clients", although they noted that "some rock fans will undoubtedly have a hard time with this story of money changers in the temple". David Nicholson, writing for The Washington Post, called it "fascinating reading", which "at its best, [sic] is informative and infuriating, a story of the wild, the innocent, and the igomaniacal." However, Nicholson criticized the book's "unnecessary 60s' nostalgia", calling it "a not altogether convincing thesis".

Paul Verna, writing for Billboard, called it "a fascinating inquiry into the lives of people who defined the parameters of the modern music industry" and compared it to Fredric Dannen's Hit Men, while noting that the title, which is from Hank William's song of the same name, was "a metaphor for the uneasy marriage between the art and business of music". Music critic Robert Christgau, writing for the Los Angeles Times, was critical of the book, calling it "a great story that's weakened by a humdrum thesis–or, to be more precise, tells a bunch of great stories that cry out for a thesis strong enough to hold them together". He criticized the sections covering Bruce Springsteen, calling it an "unstated personal animus against the artist" and stating that "Goodman can't get over the inevitable fact that Springsteen isn't the wartless paragon hagiographers like Marsh claim."
