= Wendy Winsted =

American folk singer

- Born: September 1, 1947; Oklahoma
- Died: 1991 (aged 43–44)
- Occupations: Folksinger, songwriter, author

Wendy L. Winsted (September 1, 1947 – 1991) was an American folksinger and author. Marc Morrone credited Winsted with popularizing ferrets as pets in the United States in the mid-1970s.

== Early life and education ==
Winsted was from Stillwater, Oklahoma, the daughter of Frank Arthor Winsted and Juanita June Preston Winsted. Her mother was a schoolteacher and her father was the city manager of Ponca City, Oklahoma. He also worked in the petroleum industry. She attended Stillwater High School in Oklahoma. She was a pre-medical student at Hunter College in New York City, and working as a veterinary assistant, when she began keeping skunks and later ferrets as pets, and breeding ferrets for sale. She attended medical school at the University of Cincinnati and was graduated in the class of 1985.

== Musical career ==
After high school, Winsted was a folksinger and songwriter. She was friends with Jean Ray (of Jim and Jean) and Phil Ochs in New York City. In 1971, she opened for Paul Siebel at a coffeehouse in Buffalo, and played with Paul Geremia at Lehigh University. She played guitar and trumpet. She co-wrote a song, "Livin' in the Country", which was recorded by Tom Rush.

== Veterinary career ==
Winsted perfected the procedure for de-scenting young ferrets (by removing the anal scent sac and neutering males to eliminate their odor). She introduced ferrets to numerous celebrities such as Dick Smothers and David Carradine and appeared on television numerous times with her own ferrets, including an appearance on Late Night with David Letterman.

Winsted taught her method of de-scenting ferrets to several breeders and farms across the United States, thereby making de-scented ferrets the standard for being sold at pet stores. She also endorsed skunks as pets, though she admitted it "takes a very special kind of person".

== Publications ==
- Ferrets: A Complete Introduction (1983) ISBN 0-86622-829-2
- Ferrets In Your Home (1990) ISBN 0-86622-988-4

== Personal life ==
Winsted died in the 1991 from ovarian cancer.
