= Merrimack County (album) =

Studio album by Tom Rush
- Released: April 1972
- Recorded: 1972
- Genre: Country rock; folk rock
- Label: Columbia
- Producer: Tom Rush

Tom Rush chronology
Wrong End of the Rainbow (1970)	Merrimack County (1972)	Ladies Love Outlaws (1974)

Singles from Merrimack County
- 1. "Mother Earth" Released: March 20, 1972; 2. "Kids These Days" Released: August 10, 1972

Professional ratings
Review scores
Source	Rating
AllMusic	3/5 stars

Merrimack County is the 1972 album from pioneer folk rock musician Tom Rush. The standout tracks are "Mink Julip", "Mother Earth", "Jamaica, Say You Will", "Wind on the Water" and "Roll Away the Grey". The album was on the Billboard 200 chart for ten weeks and charted as high as #128 on June 3, 1972.

== Track listing ==
Side one

1. "Kids These Days" (Tom Rush, Trevor Veitch) – 4:10
2. "Mink Julip" (Tom Rush) – 2:25
3. "Mother Earth" (Eric Kaz) – 2:36
4. "Jamaica, Say You Will" (Jackson Browne) – 4:11
5. "Merrimack County II" (Tom Rush, Trevor Veitch) – 2:46

Side two

1. "Gypsy Boy" (Bob Carpenter) – 3:20
2. "Wind on the Water" (Tom Rush) – 3:34
3. "Roll Away the Grey" (Bob Carpenter) – 2:59
4. "Seems the Songs" (Tom Rush) – 3:39
5. "Gone Down River" (Tom Rush) – 4:16

== Personnel ==
=== Musicians ===
- Tom Rush – guitar, lead vocals
- Trevor Veitch – guitar, mandolin, backing vocals
- James Rolleston – bass, backing vocals
- Gary Mallaber – drums, percussion, vibraphone
- Paul Armin – fiddle
- Erik Robertson – organ, piano
- Bill Stevenson – piano
- Kathryn Moses – flute
- John Savage – drums on "Roll Away the Grey"
- Ed Freeman – string arranger, conductor on "Wind on the Water" and "Seems the Songs"

=== Technical ===
- Tom Rush – producer
- Jay Messina – engineer
- Byron Linardos – photography
- Richard Navin – design
