= Ladies Love Outlaws (Tom Rush album) =

Studio album by Tom Rush
- Released: September 1974
- Recorded: 1974
- Studios: Mediasound, New York City
- Genre: Country rock/folk rock
- Length: 35:30
- Label: Columbia
- Producer: Mark Spector

Tom Rush chronology
Merrimack County (1972)	Ladies Love Outlaws (1974)	New Year (1982)

Singles from Ladies Love Outlaws
- 1. "Ladies Love Outlaws" Released: August 1974; 2. "No Regrets" Released: January 1975

Professional ratings
Review scores
Source	Rating
AllMusic	3/5 stars

Ladies Love Outlaws is a 1974 country rock album from folk rock musician Tom Rush. The album spent nine weeks on the Billboard 200 charts, peaking at number 124 on November 16, 1974.

== Track listing ==
Side one'

1. "Ladies Love Outlaws" (Lee Clayton) – 2:28
2. "Hobo's Mandolin" (Michael Peter Smith) – 3:12
3. "Indian Woman from Wichita" (Wayne Berry) – 4:19
4. "Maggie" (Arranged and adapted by Tom Rush) – 3:32
5. "Desperados Waiting for a Train" (Guy Clark) – 3:30

Side two

1. "Claim on Me" (Clayton) – 4:08
2. "Jenny Lynn" (Richard Dean) – 2:59
3. "Black Magic Gun" (Wayne Berry) – 3:26
4. "No Regrets" (Rush) – 5:41
5. "One Day I Walk" (Bruce Cockburn) – 2:15

== Personnel ==
=== Musicians ===
- Tom Rush – acoustic guitar, lead vocals
- Jeff "Skunk" Baxter – electric guitar (tracks 1, 3), dobro (tracks 4, 8, 10), acoustic guitar (track 9), pedal steel guitar (tracks 6–9)
- Elliott Randall – electric guitar (tracks 1, 5–7, 9), acoustic guitar (tracks 1, 3–6, 8)
- Bob Babbitt – bass
- Jerry Friedman – electric guitar (tracks 6–7)
- Leon Pendarvis – keyboards (tracks 3, 6–7)
- Allan Schwartzberg – drums (tracks 1–3, 6–7)
- Andrew Smith – drums (tracks 5, 9)
- George Devens – percussion (tracks 6, 8–9)
- Rupert Holmes – background vocals (track 1), string arrangements (tracks 3–6, 9)
- James Taylor – background vocals (track 7)
- Carly Simon – background vocals (track 9)
- Carl Hall – background vocals (track 3)
- Tasha Thomas – background vocals (track 3)
- Tim Schmit & Friends – background vocals (track 6)

=== The Memphis Horns ===
- Wayne Jackson – trumpet
- Jack Hale – trombone
- Ed Logan – tenor saxophone
- Andrew Love – tenor saxophone
- James Mitchell – baritone saxophone

(tracks 1, 5)

=== Technical ===
- Mark Spector – producer
- Alan Varner – engineer
- Lou Schlossberg – assistant engineer
- Terry Rosiello – assistant engineer
- Allan Blazek, Jeffrey Lesser, Roger Nichols, Stan Tonkel, Ted Sturges – additional engineering (overdubs)
- Stewart Romain – mastering
- John Berg – design
- Beverly Mundy – photography
- James Grashow – cover art
