= Tom Rush =

American singer-songwriter (born 1941)

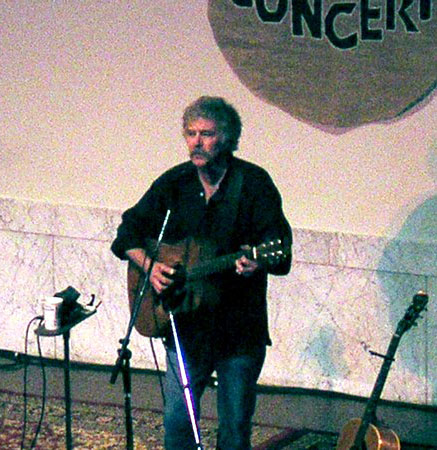
- Rush performing in 2006

Background information
- Born: February 8, 1941 (age 85); Portsmouth, New Hampshire, U.S.
- Genres: Blues, folk, country
- Occupations: Singer, songwriter
- Instruments: Vocals, acoustic guitar
- Years active: 1961–present
- Labels: Elektra, Prestige, Columbia
- Website: tomrush.com

Tom Rush (born February 8, 1941) is an American folk and blues singer, guitarist, and songwriter whose success helped launch the careers of other singer-songwriters in the 1960s and who has continued his own singing career for 60 years.

== Life and career ==
Rush was born in Portsmouth, New Hampshire, the adopted son of a teacher at St. Paul's School, in Concord, New Hampshire. He began performing in 1961 while studying at Harvard University, after having graduated from the Groton School. He majored in English literature. His early recordings include Southern and Appalachian folk and old-time country songs, Woody Guthrie ballads and acoustic-guitar blues such as Jesse Fuller's San Francisco Bay Blues which appeared on his first two LPs. He regularly performed at the Club 47 coffeehouse (now called Club Passim) in Cambridge, the Unicorn in Boston, and The Main Point in Bryn Mawr, Pennsylvania. In the 1970s, he lived in Deering, New Hampshire. As of 2025, Rush lives in Southern Maine, not far from his New Hampshire birthplace.

Rolling Stone magazine credits him with ushering in the era of the singer-songwriter. In addition to performing his own compositions, he sang songs by Joni Mitchell, Jackson Browne, James Taylor, Murray McLauchlan, David Wiffen and William Hawkins, helping them gain recognition early in their careers.

His 1968 composition "No Regrets" is now a standard, with numerous cover versions having been recorded. (Rush did two radically different versions himself.) These include covers by The Walker Brothers, which gave Rush Top Ten credit as the songwriter on the UK Singles Chart and whose success Rush credits with putting his two children through college; Emmylou Harris, who included the song on her 1988 album Bluebird; and Midge Ure, whose cover also made the UK Top Ten.

Ten years after it was posted, a YouTube video of him performing Steven Walters' "The Remember Song" has received over seven million plays. Writing on his website, Rush said,

I've been waiting 45 years to be an overnight sensation, and it's finally happened! A video clip of my performance of The Remember Song has "gone viral". I felt terrible at first, thinking I was being accused of being a musical equivalent of Ebola, but my children explained to me that this was a good thing.

One of the earliest music videos produced for an artist by a record company, from 1968, can be found at his website. It was used by Elektra Records to promote his signature song, "No Regrets" for his The Circle Game album.

Over the years, Rush has used a number of guitars on stage. His current primary one is a handcrafted acoustic guitar made by Don Musser. In February 2012, he appeared on stage in Colorado with a new instrument, a cedar-top Dreadnought with an inlay of a snake wrapped around a reclining nude woman. The guitar, crafted by McKenzie & Marr Guitars, is a "re-incarnation" of one of Rush's earliest acoustics.

On December 28, 2012, Rush appeared at Boston's Symphony Hall to celebrate fifty years in the music business. He had first performed there in 1958 and for many years performed there regularly, often in December.

As of late 2023, Rush continues to perform regularly and to tour regionally.

Rush's latest albums are Voices, released in 2018, and Gardens Old, Flowers New (March 1, 2024). In recent years, he has frequently toured the United States, often accompanied on piano by Berklee graduate Matt Nakoa.

== Discography ==
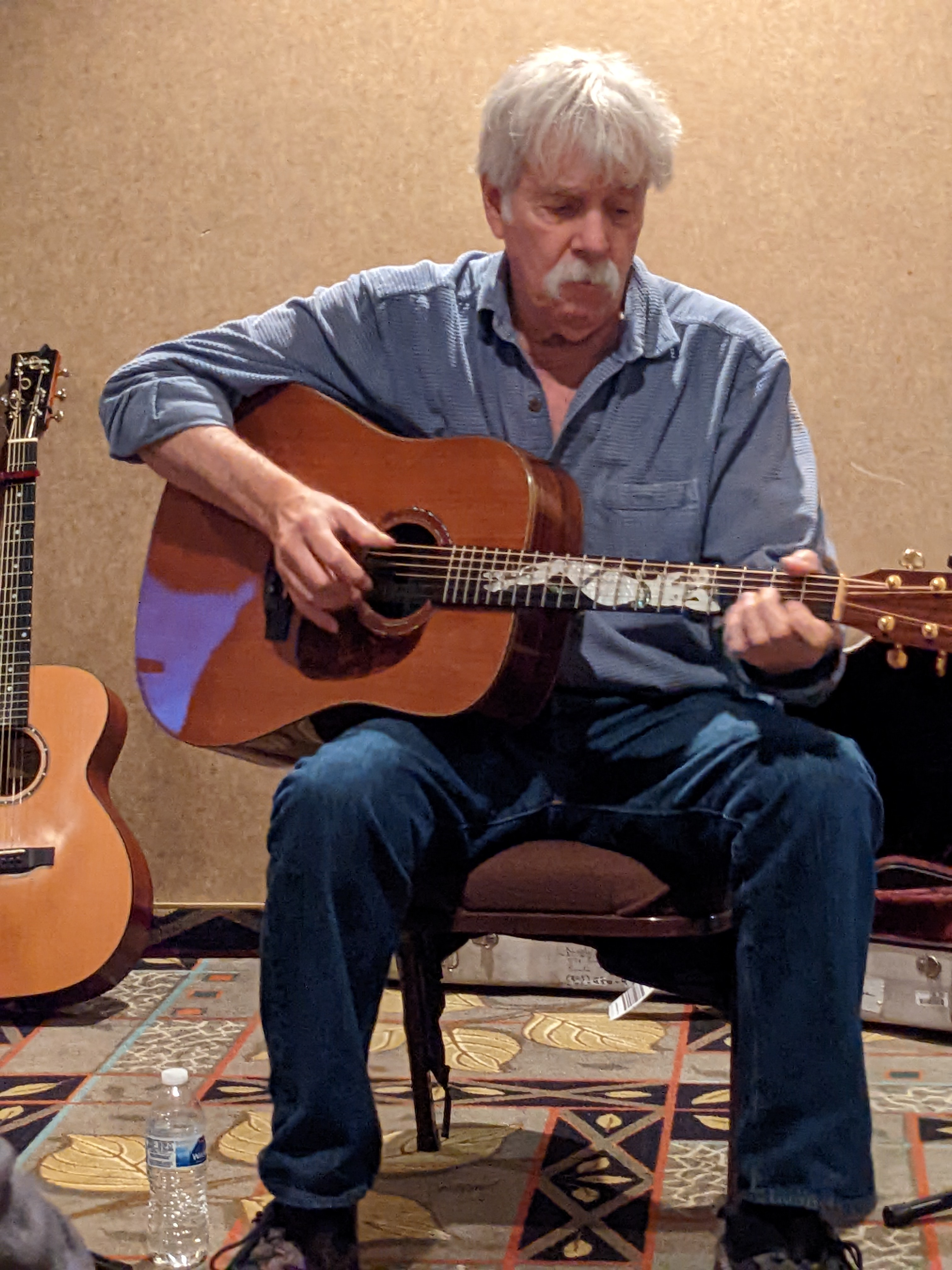
Playing in September 2022

- 1962 Tom Rush at the Unicorn (Lycornu)
- 1964 Got a Mind to Ramble (Prestige)
- 1965 Blues, Songs & Ballads (Prestige)
- 1965 Tom Rush (Elektra)
- 1966 Take a Little Walk with Me (Elektra)
- 1968 The Circle Game (Elektra)
- 1970 Classic Rush (Elektra)
- 1970 Tom Rush (Columbia)
- 1970 Wrong End of the Rainbow (Columbia)
- 1972 Merrimack County (Columbia)
- 1974 Ladies Love Outlaws (Columbia)
- 1982 New Year (Night Light)
- 1984 Late Night Radio (Night Light)
- 2001 Live at Symphony Hall, Boston (Varese Sarabande)
- 2006 Trolling for Owls (Late Night)
- 2009 What I Know (Appleseed)
- 2013 Celebrates 50 Years of Music (Appleseed)
- 2018 Voices (Appleseed)
- 2024 Gardens Old, Flowers New (Appleseed)
