= Fredric Dannen =

American journalist and author

Fredric Dannen is an American journalist and author. He is best known for his landmark book Hit Men: Powerbrokers and Fast Money Inside the Music Business (1990), which investigated the behind-the-scenes dealings of the major American record labels in the 1970s and 1980s, focussing on the careers of leading CBS Records executives Walter Yetnikoff and Dick Asher. Hit Men came in second on Billboard Magazine's list of "100 Greatest Music Books of All Time."

More recently, Dannen was the co-author (with Barry Long) of Hong Kong Babylon: An Insider's Guide to the Hollywood of the East, in which Dannen examines the connections between the Hong Kong film industry and Asian organised crime.

Dannen was a contributing editor of Vanity Fair and in 1986 he was co-recipient of the Overseas Press Club's, Morton Frank Award for business reporting from abroad. His articles have appeared in The New York Times, Channels, Barron's and Rolling Stone. The Martin Scorsese-produced movie Revenge of the Green Dragons was based on Frederick Dannen's New Yorker article chronicling Asian-American gang life in Queens, New York.

== Works ==
Works by Fredric Dannen include:

- Dannen, Fredric; Long, Barry (1997). Hong Kong Babylon: The Insider's Guide to the Hollywood of the East. New York: Miramax Books. ISBN 9780786862672.
