= Prairie Oyster discography =

- Studio albums: 7
- Compilation albums: 1
- Singles: 36
- Music videos: 16

This is a discography for Canadian country music group Prairie Oyster.

== Studio albums ==
=== 1980s ===
Title	Details
Oyster Tracks	Release date: 1986; Label: Stony Plain Records

=== 1990s ===
Title	Details	Peak chart positions			Certifications (sales thresholds)
Title	Details	CAN Country	CAN	US Country	Certifications (sales thresholds)
Different Kind of Fire	Release date: April 10, 1990; Label: RCA Records	—	65	61	CAN: Platinum
Everybody Knows	Release date: September 19, 1991; Label: RCA Records	6	—	—	CAN: Platinum
Only One Moon	Release date: April 8, 1994; Label: Arista Records	2	34	—	CAN: Platinum
Blue Plate Special	Release date: August 28, 1996; Label: Velvel Records	5	—	—	CAN: Gold
What Is This Country?	Release date: November 10, 1998; Label: ViK. Recordings	11	—	—	
"—" denotes releases that did not chart

=== 2000s ===
Title	Details
One Kiss	Release date: August 22, 2006; Label: Open Road Recordings

== Compilation albums ==
Title	Details	Peak positions
Title	Details	CAN Country
String of Pearls: A Greatest Hits Collection	Release date: June 20, 2000; Label: ViK. Recordings	15

== Singles ==
=== 1980s ===
Year	Single	Peak chart positions		Album
Year	Single	CAN Country	CAN AC	Album
1984	"Juke Joint Johnny"	—	—	—N/a
1985	"Rain Rain"	43	25	Oyster Tracks
1985	"You Got a Way"	—	—	Oyster Tracks
1985	"Give It a Little More Time"	—	—	Oyster Tracks
1986	"Juke Joint Johnny" (re-release)	—	—	Oyster Tracks
1986	"Man in the Moon"	51	—	Oyster Tracks
1987	"Play Me Some Honky Tonk Music"	32	—	Oyster Tracks
"—" denotes releases that did not chart

=== 1990s ===
Year	Single	Peak chart positions			Album
Year	Single	CAN Country	CAN AC	US Country	Album
1990	"Goodbye, So Long, Hello"	3	—	62	Different Kind of Fire
1990	"I Don't Hurt Anymore"	5	—	70	Different Kind of Fire
1990	"Lonely You, Lonely Me"	15	—	—	Different Kind of Fire
1991	"Something to Remember You By"	5	—	—	Different Kind of Fire
1991	"Did You Fall in Love with Me"	7	—	—	Everybody Knows
1991	"One Precious Love"	8	—	51	Everybody Knows
1992	"Will I Do (Till the Real Thing Comes Along)"	10	—	—	Everybody Knows
1992	"Everybody Knows"	8	—	—	Everybody Knows
1992	"Here's to You"	27	—	—	Everybody Knows
1993	"Just for Old Time's Sake"	30	—	—	Everybody Knows
1994	"Such a Lonely One"	1	6	—	Only One Moon
1994	"Louisiette"	4	25	—	Only One Moon
1994	"Black-Eyed Susan"	7	—	—	Only One Moon
1995	"Don't Cry Little Angel"	1	—	—	Only One Moon
1995	"Only One Moon"	1	—	—	Only One Moon
1995	"Ancient History"	5	—	—	Only One Moon
1996	"Unbelievable Love"	1	28	—	Blue Plate Special
1996	"One Way Track"	4	—	—	Blue Plate Special
1997	"She Won't Be Lonely Long"	12	—	—	Blue Plate Special
1997	"Tonight There's a Blue Moon"	19	—	—	Blue Plate Special
1998	"Canadian Sunrise"	5	—	—	What Is This Country?
1999	"Keep On Dreaming"	9	—	—	What Is This Country?
1999	"One of Those Nights"	45	—	—	What Is This Country?
"—" denotes releases that did not chart

=== 2000s ===
Year	Single	Album
2000	"Man in the Moon" (with Jenny Whiteley)^{[A]}	String of Pearls: A Greatest Hits Collection
2006	"Sweet Sweet Girl to Me"	One Kiss
2006	"Too Bad for Me"	One Kiss
2007	"I Threw It All Away"	One Kiss
2007	"One Kiss"	One Kiss
2007	"Open Up Your Heart"	One Kiss

== Music videos ==
Year	Video	Director
1987	"Play Me Some Honky Tonk Music"	
1990	"Goodbye, So Long, Hello"	Don Allan
1990	"I Don't Hurt Anymore"	
1990	"Lonely You, Lonely Me"	
1991	"Did You Fall in Love with Me"	
1991	"One Precious Love"	Dale Heslip
1992	"Will I Do (Till the Real Thing Comes Along)"	
1994	"Such a Lonely One"	
1994	"Black-Eyed Susan"	Deborah Samuel
1995	"Only One Moon"	
1996	"One Way Track"	Michael McNamara
1997	"She Won't Be Lonely Long"	Michael McNamara
1998	"Canadian Sunrise"	
1999	"Keep On Dreaming"	
2000	"Man in the Moon" (with Jenny Whiteley)	
2007	"One Kiss"	Anita Doron

== Notes ==
- A "Man in the Moon" peaked at number 54 on the Canadian RPM Country Tracks chart.
