= Hank Snow discography =

- Studio albums: 46
- Compilation albums: 19
- Singles: 89

Hank Snow was a Canadian country music singer-songwriter and musician. His discography consists of 46 studio albums and 89 singles. Of his 89 singles, seven reached number 1 on the U.S. Billboard Hot Country Songs charts and two reached number 1 on the Canadian RPM Country Tracks chart. Snow spent his entire recording career, from 1936 to 1981, with RCA Victor. Snow had his first hit in the United States in 1950 with I'm Moving On and his final hit in 1974 with Hello Love, at the time he was the oldest country singer to have a Number #1 charted record.

== Studio albums ==
=== 1950s ===
Title	Details
Country Classics	Release date: March 1952; Label: RCA Victor
Hank Snow Sings	Release date: October 1952; Label: RCA Victor
Hank Snow Salutes Jimmie Rodgers	Release date: April 1953; Label: RCA Victor
Just Keep a-Movin'	Release date: March 1955; Label: RCA Victor
Old Doc Brown and Other Narrations by Hank Snow	Release date: October 1955; Label: RCA Victor
Country & Western Jamboree	Release date: 1957; Label: RCA Victor
Hank Snow's Country Guitar	Release date: 1957; Label: RCA Victor
Hank Snow Sings Sacred Songs	Release date: March 1958; Label: RCA Victor
When Tragedy Struck	Release date: January 1959; Label: RCA Victor

=== 1960s ===
Title	Album details	Peak chart positions
Title	Album details	US Country
Hank Snow Sings Jimmie Rodgers Songs	Release date: February 1960; Label: RCA Victor	—
Big Country Hits (Songs I Hadn't Recorded Till Now)	Release date: October 1961; Label: RCA Victor	—
I've Been Everywhere	Release date: April 1963; Label: RCA Victor	—
Railroad Man	Release date: August 1963; Label: RCA Victor	7
Songs of Tragedy	Release date: July 1964; Label: RCA Victor	11
Hank Snow Sings Your Favorite Country Hits	Release date: February 1965; Label: RCA Victor	—
Gloryland March	Release date: June 1965; Label: RCA Victor	—
Heartbreak Trail: A Tribute to the Sons of the Pioneers	Release date: November 1965; Label: RCA Victor	26
The Guitar Stylings of Hank Snow	Release date: May 1966; Label: RCA Victor	26
Gospel Train	Release date: June 1966; Label: RCA Victor	—
Snow in Hawaii	Release date: February 1967; Label: RCA Victor	—
Christmas with Hank Snow^{[A]}	Release date: October 1967; Label: RCA Victor	—
Spanish Fire Ball and Other Hank Snow Stylings	Release date: November 1967; Label: RCA Victor	35
Tales of the Yukon	Release date: August 1968; Label: RCA Victor	35
Snow in All Seasons	Release date: February 1969; Label: RCA Victor	43
Hits Covered By Snow	Release date: June 1969; Label: RCA Victor	35

=== 1970s ===
Title	Album details	Peak chart positions
Title	Album details	US Country
Hank Snow Sings in Memory of Jimmie Rodgers	Release date: March 1970; Label: RCA Victor	45
Cure for the Blues	Release date: September 1970; Label: RCA Victor	—
Tracks and Trains	Release date: April 1971; Label: RCA Victor	45
Award Winners	Release date: September 1971; Label: RCA Victor	—
The Jimmie Rodgers Story	Release date: May 1972; Label: RCA Victor	—
Grand Ole Opry Favorites	Release date: May 1973; Label: RCA Victor	—
Snowbird	Release date: 1973; Label: RCA Victor	—
Now Is the Hour	Release date: 1974; Label: RCA Victor	—
Hello Love	Release date: March 1974; Label: RCA Victor	4
That's You and Me	Release date: July 1974; Label: RCA Victor	35
You're Easy To Love	Release date: April 1975; Label: RCA Victor	48
#104 - Still Movin' On	Release date: June 1977; Label: RCA Records	47
The Mysterious Lady	Release date: March 1979; Label: RCA Records	—
Instrumentally Yours	Release date: December 1979; Label: RCA Records	—

== Collaboration albums ==
Title	Details
Together Again (with Anita Carter)	Release date: November 1962; Label: RCA Victor
Reminiscing (with Chet Atkins)	Release date: August 1964; Label: RCA Victor
C. B. Atkins & C. E. Snow by Special Request (with Chet Atkins)	Release date: December 1969; Label: RCA Records
Live from Evangel Temple (with Jimmy Snow)	Release date: March 1976; Label: RCA Records
Lovingly Yours (with Kelly Foxton)	Release date: December 1979; Label: RCA Records
Win Some Lose Some Lonesome (with Kelly Foxton)	Release date: 1981; Label: RCA Records
Brand On My Heart (with Willie Nelson)	Release date: 1985; Label: Columbia Records

== Compilations ==
Title	Album details	Peak chart positions
Title	Album details	US Country
Country Classics	Release date: 1956; Label: RCA Victor	—
The Singing Ranger	Release date: March 1960; Label: RCA Camden	—
Hank Snow's Souvenirs	Release date: February 1961; Label: RCA Victor	—
The Southern Cannonball	Release date: April 1961; Label: RCA Camden	—
The One and Only Hank Snow	Release date: July 1962; Label: RCA Canden	—
More Hank Snow Souvenirs	Release date: February 1963; Label: RCA Victor	1
The Last Ride	Release date: September 1963; Label: RCA Camden	—
The Highest Bidder and Other Favorites	Release date: September 1965; Label: RCA Camden	—
The Best of Hank Snow	Release date: December 1965; Label: RCA Victor	—
Travelin' Blues	Release date: June 1966; Label: RCA Camden	—
This Is My Story	Release date: September 1966; Label: RCA Victor	21
Hits, Hits and More Hits	Release date: March 1968; Label: RCA Victor	—
My Nova Scotia Home	Release date: April 1968; Label: RCA Camden	—
The Legend of Old Doc Brown	Release date: May 1972; Label: RCA Camden	—
The Best of Hank Snow Volume 2	Release date: September 1972; Label: RCA Records	—
The Hits of Hank Snow	Release date: 1978 (UK); Label: RCA Records	—
The Essential Hank Snow	Release date: April 29, 1997; Label: RCA Records	—
RCA Country Legends	Release date: May 15, 2001; Label: RCA Records	—
Super Hits	Release date: June 22, 2004; Label: RCA Records	—

== Singles ==
=== 1940s and 1950s ===
Year	Single	Peak positions	Album
Year	Single	US Country	Album
1948	"My Two Timin' Woman"	—	—N/a
1949	"Marriage Vow"	10	Country Classics (1952)
1950	"I'm Moving On"	1	Country Classics (1952)
1950	"The Golden Rocket"	1	Country Classics (1952)
1951	"The Rhumba Boogie"	1	Country Classics (1952)
1951	"Unwanted Sign Upon Your Heart"	6	Country Classics (1952)
1951	"Music Makin' Mama from Memphis"	4	Country Classics (1952)
1952	"The Gold Rush Is Over"	2	The Singing Ranger
1952	"Lady's Man"	2	The One and Only Hank Snow
1952	"I Went to Your Wedding"	3	The Singing Ranger
1952	"(Now and Then There's) A Fool Such as I"	3	Country Classics (1956)
1953	"Honeymoon on a Rocket Ship"	9	The Singing Ranger
1953	"Spanish Fire Ball"	3	The One and Only Hank Snow
1953	"For Now and Always"	10	Travelin' Blues
1953	"When Mexican Joe Met Jole Blon"	6	The Southern Cannonball
1954	"I Don't Hurt Anymore"	1	Country Classics (1956)
1954	"That Crazy Mambo Thing"	10	—N/a
1954	"Let Me Go, Lover!"	1	The Southern Cannonball
1955	"Yellow Roses"	3	The Last Ride
1955	"Cryin', Prayin', Waitin', Hopin'"	7	—N/a
1955	"Born to Be Happy"	5	The Singing Ranger
1956	"These Hands"	5	Souvenirs
1956	"Conscience I'm Guilty"	4	Souvenirs
1956	"Stolen Moments"	7	More Hank Snow Souvenirs
1957	"Tangled Mind"	4	The Southern Cannonball
1958	"Whispering Rain"	15	The Last Ride
1958	"Big Wheels"	7	Railroad Man
1958	"A Woman Captured Me"	16	—N/a
1959	"Doggone That Train"	19	—N/a
1959	"Chasin' a Rainbow"	6	—N/a
1959	"The Last Ride"	3	Railroad Man

=== 1960s ===
Year	Single	Peak positions			Album
Year	Single	CAN Country	US Country	US	Album
1960	"Rockin', Rollin' Ocean"	—	22	87	The Best of Hank Snow Volume 2
1960	"Miller's Cave"	—	9	101	More Hank Snow Souvenirs
1961	"Beggar to a King"	—	5	—	—N/a
1961	"The Restless One"	—	11	—	The Legend of Old Doc Brown
1962	"You Take the Future (And I'll Take the Past)"	—	15	—	—N/a
1962	"I've Been Everywhere"	—	1	68	I've Been Everywhere
1963	"The Man Who Robbed the Bank at Santa Fe"	—	9	—	—N/a
1963	"Ninety Miles an Hour (Down a Dead End Street)"	—	2	124	The Best of Hank Snow
1964	"Breakfast with the Blues"	—	11	—	—N/a
1965	"The Wishing Well (Down in the Well)"	—	7	—	—N/a
1965	"The Queen of Draw Poker Town"	—	28	—	The Legend of Old Doc Brown
1965	"I've Cried a Mile"	—	18	—	This Is My Story
1966	"The Count Down"	—	22	—	—N/a
1966	"Hula Love"	—	21	—	Snow in Hawaii
1967	"Down at the Pawn Shop"	—	18	—	—N/a
1967	"Learnin' a New Way of Life"	15	20	—	—N/a
1968	"Who Will Answer? (Aleluya No. 1)"	—	69	—	—N/a
1968	"The Late and Great Love of My Heart"	5	20	—	—N/a
1968	"The Name of the Game Was Love"	1	16	—	Hits Covered By Snow
1969	"Rome Wasn't Built in a Day"	—	26	—	Cure for the Blues
1969	"That's When the Hurtin' Sets In"	—	53	—	—N/a
"—" denotes releases that did not chart

=== 1970s ===
Year	Single	Peak positions		Album
Year	Single	CAN Country	US Country	Album
1970	"Come the Morning"	33	57	Cure for the Blues
1970	"Vanishing Breed"	—	52	—N/a
1971	"(The Seashores) Of Old Mexico"	6	—	Award Winners
1972	"Governor's Hand"	34	—	—N/a
1973	"North to Chicago"	20	71	Grand Ole Opry Favorites
1974	"Hello Love"	1	1	Hello Love
1974	"That's You and Me"	—	36	That's You and Me
1974	"You're Easy to Love"	—	26	You're Easy to Love
1975	"Merry-Go-Round of Love"	36	47	You're Easy to Love
1975	"Hijack"	—	79	—N/a
1975	"Colorado Country Morning"	—	95	You're Easy to Love
1976	"Who's Been Here Since I've Been Gone"	—	87	—N/a
1976	"You're Wondering Why"	—	98	—N/a
1977	"Trouble in Mind"	—	81	#104 - Still Movin' On
1977	"I'm Still Movin' On"	—	80	#104 - Still Movin' On
1977	"Breakfast with the Blues" (re-recording)	—	96	#104 - Still Movin' On
1978	"Nevertheless"	—	93	The Mysterious Lady
1978	"Ramblin' Rose"	—	93	The Mysterious Lady
1979	"The Mysterious Lady from St. Martinique"	26	80	The Mysterious Lady
1979	"A Good Gal Is Hard to Find"	—	91	The Mysterious Lady
1979	"It Takes Too Long"	—	98	The Mysterious Lady
"—" denotes releases that did not chart

== Collaboration singles ==
Year	Single	Artist	Peak positions		Album
Year	Single	Artist	CAN Country	US Country	Album
1951	"Down the Trail of Achin' Hearts"	Anita Carter	—	2	Country Classics (1952)
1955	"Silver Bell"	Chet Atkins	—	15	This Is My Story
1967	"Chet's Tune"	Some of Chet's Friends	—	38	—N/a
1980	"Hasn't It Been Good Together"	Kelly Foxton	39	78	Lovingly Yours
1980	"There's Something About You"	Kelly Foxton	—	—	Lovingly Yours
1980	"The Pain Didn't Show"	Kelly Foxton	—	—	Lovingly Yours
1981	"Forbidden Lovers"	Kelly Foxton	—	—	Win Some, Lose Some, Lonesome
"—" denotes releases that did not chart

== Charted B-sides ==
Year	Single	Peak positions	A-side
Year	Single	US Country	A-side
1951	"Bluebird Island" (with Anita Carter)	4	"Down the Trail of Achin' Hearts"
1951	"Your Locket Is My Broken Heart"	12	"Unwanted Sign Upon Your heart"
1952	"Married by the Bible, Divorced by the Law"	8	"Lady's Man"
1952	"The Gal Who Invented Kissin'"	4	"(Now and Then There's) A Fool Such as I"
1955	"The Next Voice You Hear"	15	"That Crazy Mambo Thing"
1955	"Would You Mind?"	3	"Yellow Roses"
1955	"I'm Glad I Got to See You Once Again"	7	"Cryin', Prayin', Waitin', Hopin'"
1955	"Mainliner (The Hawk with Silver Wings)"	5	"Born to Be Happy"
1956	"I'm Moving In"	11	"These Hands"
1956	"Hula Rock"	5	"Conscience I'm Guilty"
1957	"My Arms Are a House"	8	"Tangled Mind"
1964	"I Stepped Over the Line"	21	"Breakfast with the Blues"
1968	"I Just Wanted to Know (How the Wind Was Blowing)"	70	"Who Will Answer? (Aleluya No. 1)"

== Notes ==
- A Christmas with Hank Snow peaked at number 72 on the Christmas Albums chart.
