= String of Pearls: A Greatest Hits Collection =

Greatest hits album by Prairie Oyster
- Released: June 20, 2000
- Genre: Country
- Length: 48:42
- Label: ViK. Recordings

Prairie Oyster chronology
What Is This Country? (1998)	String of Pearls: A Greatest Hits Collection (2000)	One Kiss (2006)

Professional ratings
Review scores
Source	Rating
Allmusic	3/5 stars

String of Pearls: A Greatest Hits Collection is the first greatest hits album by Canadian country music group Prairie Oyster. It was released by ViK. Recordings on June 20, 2000. The album peaked at number 15 on the RPM Country Albums chart.

== Track listing ==
1. "Man in the Moon" (Chris Whiteley) – 4:09
  - duet with Jenny Whiteley
2. "Goodbye, So Long, Hello" (Willie P. Bennett, Russell deCarle) – 3:08
3. "Will I Do (Till the Real Thing Comes Along)" (Joan Besen) – 2:44
4. "One Precious Love" (Besen) – 2:10
5. "Everybody Knows" (Keith Glass, Paul Kennerley) – 2:47
6. "Did You Fall in Love with Me" (Besen) – 3:36
7. "Louisiette" (Glass) – 3:20
8. "Such a Lonely One" (deCarle) – 3:29
9. "Black-Eyed Susan" (Besen, Ron Hynes) – 3:30
10. "She Won't Be Lonely Long" (Glass) – 3:32
11. "Unbelievable Love" (Besen) – 3:34
12. "One Way Track" (Bennett, deCarle) – 5:41
13. "Canadian Sunrise" (Besen) – 3:51
14. "The Last Time I'll Feel Blue" (Glass) – 3:11

== Chart performance ==
Chart (2000)	Peak position
Canadian RPM Country Albums	15
