= Everybody Knows =

Everybody Knows may refer to:

== Film and television ==
- Everybody Knows (film), a 2018 Spanish thriller film
- Everybody Knows, a 2008 TV documentary about Leonard Cohen; also a 2014 concert video by Cohen; see Leonard Cohen discography
- "Everybody Knows" (Ballers), a 2016 television episode

== Music ==
=== Albums ===
- Everybody Knows (Prairie Oyster album) or the title song (see below), 1991
- Everybody Knows (Sonia album) or the title song, 1990
- Everybody Knows (Stills & Collins album), by Stephen Stills and Judy Collins, 2017
- Everybody Knows (Trisha Yearwood album) or the title song (see below), 1996
- Everybody Knows (The Young Gods album), 2010
- Everybody Knows (Dave Clark Five album), 1968, or the title song (see below)
- Everybody Knows (EP), by Ryan Adams, UK title of Follow the Lights, or the title song (see below), 2007
- Everybody Knows, by Sharon Robinson, 2008

=== Songs ===
- "Everybody Knows" (Dave Clark Five song), 1967 (see below for their 1964 song)
- "Everybody Knows" (Dixie Chicks song), 2006
- "Everybody Knows" (John Legend song), 2009
- "Everybody Knows" (Leonard Cohen song), 1988
- "Everybody Knows" (Prairie Oyster song), 1992
- "Everybody Knows" (Trisha Yearwood song), 1996
- "Everybody Knows", by Chris Brown from Heartbreak on a Full Moon, 2017
- "Everybody Knows", by Edison Lighthouse, 1971
- "Everybody Knows', by Idina Menzel from Idina, 2016
- "Everybody Knows", by Ivy from All Hours, 2011
- "Everybody Knows", by James from Laid, 1993
- "Everybody Knows", by Janis Ian from The Secret Life of J. Eddy Fink, 1968
- "Everybody Knows", by Kids of 88 from Sugarpills, 2010
- "Everybody Knows", by Kimbra from Primal Heart, 2018
- "Everybody Knows", by McFly from Radio:Active, 2008
- "Everybody Knows", by Moka Only from I'm Delighted, 2016
- "Everybody Knows", by Ryan Adams from Easy Tiger, 2007
- "Everybody Knows", by the Wanted from Word of Mouth, 2013
- "Everybody Knows", by Westlife, a B-side of the single "Swear It Again", 1999
- "Everybody Knows (Except You)", by the Divine Comedy from A Short Album About Love, 1997
- "Everybody Knows (I Still Love You)", by the Dave Clark Five from Coast to Coast, 1964

== See also ==
- Common knowledge
