= One Kiss (disambiguation) =

"One Kiss" is a 2018 song by Calvin Harris and Dua Lipa.

One Kiss may also refer to:

== Songs ==
- "Himbeerrot (One Kiss)", a 2024 song by Vanessa Mai
- "One Kiss", a 2023 song by Red Velvet off the album Chill Kill
- "One Kiss", a 2019 song on the Descendants 3 soundtrack
- "One Kiss", a 2012 song by Tanita Tikaram off the album Can't Go Back (album)
- "One Kiss", a 2012 song by For All Those Sleeping off the album Outspoken (album)
- "One Kiss", a 2006 song by Prairie Oyster also released as single, off the eponymous album One Kiss (album)
- "One Kiss", a 1990 song by John Hiatt off the album Stolen Moments (John Hiatt album)
- "The One Kiss", a 1979 song by The Doll (band) off the album Listen to the Silence
- "One Kiss", a 1977 song by Bryan Ferry off the album In Your Mind (album)
- "One Kiss", a song by Eddie Cochran from the 1957 album Singin' to My Baby
- "One Kiss", song from the 1928 operetta The New Moon and two film versions: New Moon (1930) New Moon (1940)

== Other uses ==
- One Kiss (album), a 2006 album by Prairie Oyster
- One Kiss (film), a 2016 film directed by Ivan Cotroneo

== See also ==
- Ae Fond Kiss
