= More Hank Snow Souvenirs =

Compilation album by Hank Snow
- Released: 1964
- Genre: Country
- Label: RCA Victor

More Hank Snow Souvenirs is a compilation album by country music singer Hank Snow. It was released in 1964 by RCA Victor (catalog LSP-2812).

The album debuted on Billboard magazine's country album chart on April 25, 1964, peaked at No. 1, and remained on the chart for a total of 26 weeks.

AllMusic gave the album a rating of four stars. Critic Eugene Chadbourne wrote that there was "no 'yellow snow' amidst this material."

== Track listing ==
Side A

1. "Let Me Go, Lover!"
2. "The Gal Who Invented Kissin'"
3. "The Next Voice You Hear"
4. "One More Ride"
5. "Stolen Moments"
6. "A Faded Petal from a Beautiful Bouquet"

Side B

1. "Miller's Cave"
2. "The Wreck of the Old '97"
3. "Tangled Mind"
4. "The Gold Rush Is Over"
5. "Down the Trail of Achin' Hearts"
6. The Change of the Tides"
