= The Last Ride =

The Last Ride may refer to:

== Film ==
- The Last Ride (1931 film), an American crime film
- The Last Ride (1944 film), an American crime film about tire bootleggers
- The Last Ride (1994 film), also known as F.T.W., an American film starring Mickey Rourke
- The Last Ride (2004 film), an American action drama
- Last Ride (2009 film), a 2009 Australian drama
- The Last Ride (2011 film), an American drama about Hank Williams
- The Last Ride (2016 film), a Korean film

== Television ==
- "The Last Ride" (Brooklyn Nine-Nine), a television episode
- Undertaker: The Last Ride, a 2020 5-part documentary about The Undertaker

== Music ==
- The Last Ride (album), second album by The Hrsmn 2021
- "The Last Ride", Top 10 hit (chart No. 3) country song by Hank Snow from Railroad Man (album) 1964
- "The Last Ride" (song), a 2022 song by Sidhu Moose Wala
- "The Last Ride", from Johnny Marr + the Healers Boomslang (album) 2003
- "Last Ride", song by Green Day from Nimrod (album)

== Other uses ==
- The Last Ride (novel), a 1995 western novel by Thomas Eidson
- The Last Ride, an elevated powerbomb, wrestling move performed by The Undertaker

== See also ==
- One Last Ride (disambiguation)
