= Ember Swift =

Canadian singer-songwriter and guitarist

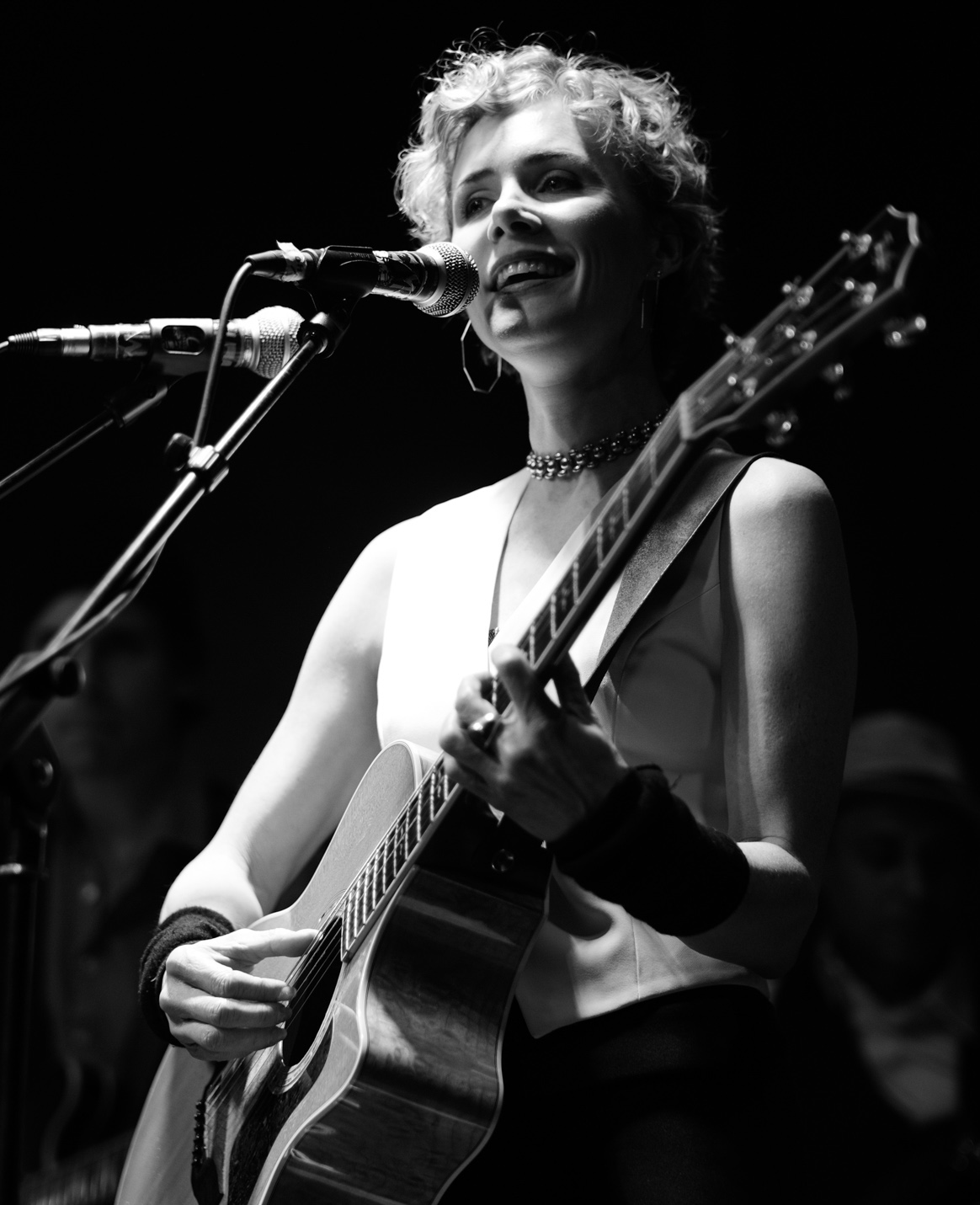

Background information
- Also known as: 子玉
- Origin: Toronto, Ontario, Canada
- Genres: Singer-songwriter, folk, jazz, world
- Years active: 1996–present
- Label: Few'll Ignite Sound
- Website: www.emberswift.com

Ember Swift (born in Woodstock, Oxford County, Ontario, Canada) is a Canadian singer, songwriter and guitarist. She has released 11 studio albums in English and Mandarin.

== Career ==
Swift graduated from the University of Toronto with a degree in East Asian Studies. In 1998, she and regular band member Lyndell Montgomery (electric violin, bass guitar) began touring North America, Australia and later, New Caledonia. Their live shows featured Toronto-based percussionist and drummer Cheryl Reid. Swift and Montgomery later worked with Michelle Josef and Adam Bowman on drums and percussion. Reid continued to work with Swift and Montgomery until 2008 as a part-time player, and also worked with Swift when she toured North America.

In 2008, Swift moved to Beijing and assembled a new band, consisting of Zac Courtney on drums, Paplus Ntahombaye on bass, and Wang Ya Qi 王雅琪 on the traditional Chinese instrument, the erhu.

In 2014, Swift performed on the stage of the competition program “Mamma Mia” and won third place in the national finals.

Swift is also a voice over artist and writer, and has published work in magazines and literary quarterlies. She appeared as a vocalist on the video game Mobile Legends. A memoir was scheduled to be released in 2022.

In 2021 Swift released an album entitled Mid-March Meltdown, which was partially co-written with Beijing-based band member Gabriel Beaudoin and mixed with co-producer Tim Abraham. She released three music videos covering tracks from the album.

== Personal life ==
Swift identifies as queer.. She had a romantic relationship with her then-musical partner Lyndell Montgomery for 9 1/2 years, before moving to China and marrying the Chinese reggae and rock musician Guo Jian (国囝), with whom she had a daughter in January 2012 and a son in December 2013. She separated from Guo in 2015 and was formally divorced in 2018. Swift continued to live in Beijing with her two children until October 2025, when she moved with them (and her partner, the Quebecois guitarist Gabriel Beaudoin) to Normandy, France.

== Discography ==
=== Studio albums ===
- Self-Titled (1996)
- InsectInside (1997)
- Can't Corner Me (1998)
- Permanent Marker (1999)
- Stiltwalking (2002)
- Disarming (2004)
- The Dirty Pulse (2006)
- Lentic: The New Project (2009)
- 11:11 (2011)
- Sticks & Stones (2017)
- Mid-March Meltdown (2021)

=== Live albums ===
- The Wage Is the Stage (live) (2000)
- Snapshots (live EP) (2000)
- Witness: Live in Australia (2005; DVD)

== Awards ==
- 2006: "Youth Role Model of the Year" – Jer's Version Foundation
- 2006: Best Band Website – Canadian Independent Music Award
