= Hank Snow's Souvenirs =

Compilation album by Hank Snow
- Released: 1961
- Genre: Country
- Label: RCA Victor
- Producer: Chet Atkins

Hank Snow's Souvenirs is a compilation album by country music singer Hank Snow. It was released in 1961 by RCA Victor (catalog LPM-2285). It was produced by Chet Atkins.

In Billboard magazine's annual poll of country and western disc jockeys, it was ranked No. 3 among the "Favorite Country Music Albums" of 1961.

== Track listing ==
Side A

1. "The Rhumba Boogie"
2. "I'm Moving On"
3. "(Now and Then There's) A Fool Such as I"
4. "The Golden Rocket"
5. "I Don't Hurt Anymore"
6. "Music Makin' Mama from Memphis"

Side B

1. "With This Ring I Thee Wed"
2. "Conscience I'm Guilty"
3. "Bluebird Island"
4. "Marriage Vow"
5. "These Hands"
6. "My Mother"
