= John P. Allen (musician) =

Canadian musician

John P. Allen is a Canadian country, rock, and bluegrass fiddler.

Allen was a member of the rock band Great Speckled Bird in the 1970s, and played with bluegrass bands the Good Brothers, Big Redd Ford and the Dixie Flyers. He played country fiddle as a member of Tommy Hunter's band. Allen joined the country band Prairie Oyster in 1982, with whom he won six Juno awards.

In 2005 Allen recorded an album, The Canadian ̶ F̶̶i̶̶d̶̶d̶̶l̶̶e̶ Violin, featuring a mix of original music and a few carefully chosen covers covering a wide range of musical styles. The album was produced Sonny Besen Thrasher, son of Allen's Prairie Oyster bandmate Joan Besen. A second solo album, A Canadian Portrait, followed in 2008 sticking more closely to traditional country music.

Allen experienced cardio-vascular health problems in the spring of 2019 resulting in a successful heart transplant, but has been unable to work since (as of December 2019). A star-studded benefit was held for him in Thorndale, Ontario, on December 8, 2019.

As a member of Prairie Oyster, Allen was inducted into the Canadian Country Music Hall of Fame in 2008. He was inducted into the Forest City London Music Awards Hall of Fame in 2019.

== Discography ==
See also Prairie Oyster

- The Canadian ̶ F̶̶i̶̶d̶̶d̶̶l̶̶e̶ Violin (2005)
- A Canadian Portrait (2008) - as "John P. Allen With The Bachelor Farmers"
