= One Last Ride (disambiguation) =

One Last Ride may refer to:

== Stage and screen ==
=== Film ===
- One Last Ride (film), a 2004 American drama film
- One Last Ride (porn film), a 2010 adult video; see AVN Award for Best Actress / 27th AVN Awards

=== Television ===
- "One Last Ride", a 2015 season 7 two-part episode of Parks and Recreation, forming the series finale.
- "One Last Ride", a season 2-episode of 2010s true crime TV show Stolen Voices, Buried Secrets
- "One Last Ride", 1980 five-part American afterschool special; see CBS Schoolbreak Special

== Music ==
- One Last Ride (album), a 2018 heavy metal album by 'Chrome Division'

=== Songs ===
- "One Last Time" (Hamilton song), a song from the 2015 musical Hamilton, formerly called "One Last Ride"
- "One Last Ride" (song), a 1976 song by Maxine Nightingale off the album Right Back Where We Started From (album)
- "One Last Ride" (song), a 1986 song by Outlaws off the album Soldiers of Fortune (album)
- "One Last Ride" (song), a 2000 song by Molly Hatchet off the album Kingdom of XII
- "One Last Ride" (song), a 2003 song by Jimmy Rankin off the album Handmade (Jimmy Rankin album)
- "One Last Ride" (song), a 2020 song by Harris Allan

== Other uses ==
- One Last Ride (book), a 2019 autobiography by pro-wrestler Scott Casey

== See also ==
- The Last Ride (disambiguation)
