= Hello Love (Hank Snow album) =

Studio album by Hank Snow
- Released: 1974
- Genre: Country
- Label: RCA Victor

Hank Snow chronology
Now Is the Hour (1974)	Hello Love (1974)	That's You and Me (1974)

Hello Love is a studio album by country music singer Hank Snow. It was released in 1974 by RCA Victor (catalog APL1-0441).

The album debuted on Billboard magazine's country album chart on April 13, 1974, peaked at No. 4, and remained on the chart for a total of 15 weeks. It included the No. 1 hit "Hello Love". It was Snow's last album to break into the Top 25.

== Track listing ==
Side A

1. "Hello Love"
2. "I've Got to Give It All to You"
3. "Today I Started Loving You Again"
4. "The Last Thing on My Mind"
5. "It Just Happened That Way"

Side B

1. "Daisy a Day"
2. "I Have You and That's Enough for Me"
3. "Somewhere My Love"
4. "I Washed My Hands in Muddy Water"
5. "Why Me, Lord"

== Charts ==
=== Weekly charts ===
Chart (1974)	Peak position
US Top Country Albums (Billboard)	4

=== Year-end charts ===
Chart (1974)	Position
US Top Country Albums (Billboard)	39
