= Keep On Dreaming =

Single by Prairie Oyster

from the album What Is This Country?
- Released: 1999
- Genre: Country
- Label: ViK. Recordings
- Songwriters: Joan Besen; J. P. Daniel
- Producers: Mike Poole; Prairie Oyster

Prairie Oyster singles chronology
"Canadian Sunrise" (1998)	"Keep On Dreaming" (1999)	"One of Those Nights" (1999)

"Keep On Dreaming" is a song recorded by Canadian country music group Prairie Oyster. It was released in 1999 as the second single from their sixth studio album, What Is This Country?. It peaked at number 9 on the RPM Country Tracks chart in April 1999.

== Chart performance ==
Chart (1999)	Peak position
Canada Country Singles (RPM)	9

=== Year-end charts ===
Chart (1999)	Position
Canada Country Tracks (RPM)	72
