= Ancient History (song) =

Single by Prairie Oyster

from the album Only One Moon
- Released: 1995
- Genre: Country
- Length: 2:43
- Label: Arista
- Songwriters: Bob DiPiero; John Scott Sherrill
- Producers: Steve Fishell; Prairie Oyster

Prairie Oyster singles chronology
"Only One Moon" (1995)	"Ancient History" (1995)	"Unbelievable Love" (1996)

"Ancient History" is a song recorded by Canadian country music group Prairie Oyster. It was released in 1995 as the sixth single from their fourth studio album, Only One Moon, released in Canada by Arista Records. The song peaked at number 5 on the RPM Country Tracks chart in January 1996.

It was originally recorded by Pam Tillis on her 1991 album Put Yourself in My Place. Tillis' version was the B-side of the album's last single, "Blue Rose Is".

== Chart performance ==
Chart (1995–1996)	Peak position
Canada Country Singles (RPM)	5

=== Year-end charts ===
Chart (1996)	Position
Canada Country Tracks (RPM)	79
