= Betty Jean Robinson =

American Christian music singer (1933–2021)

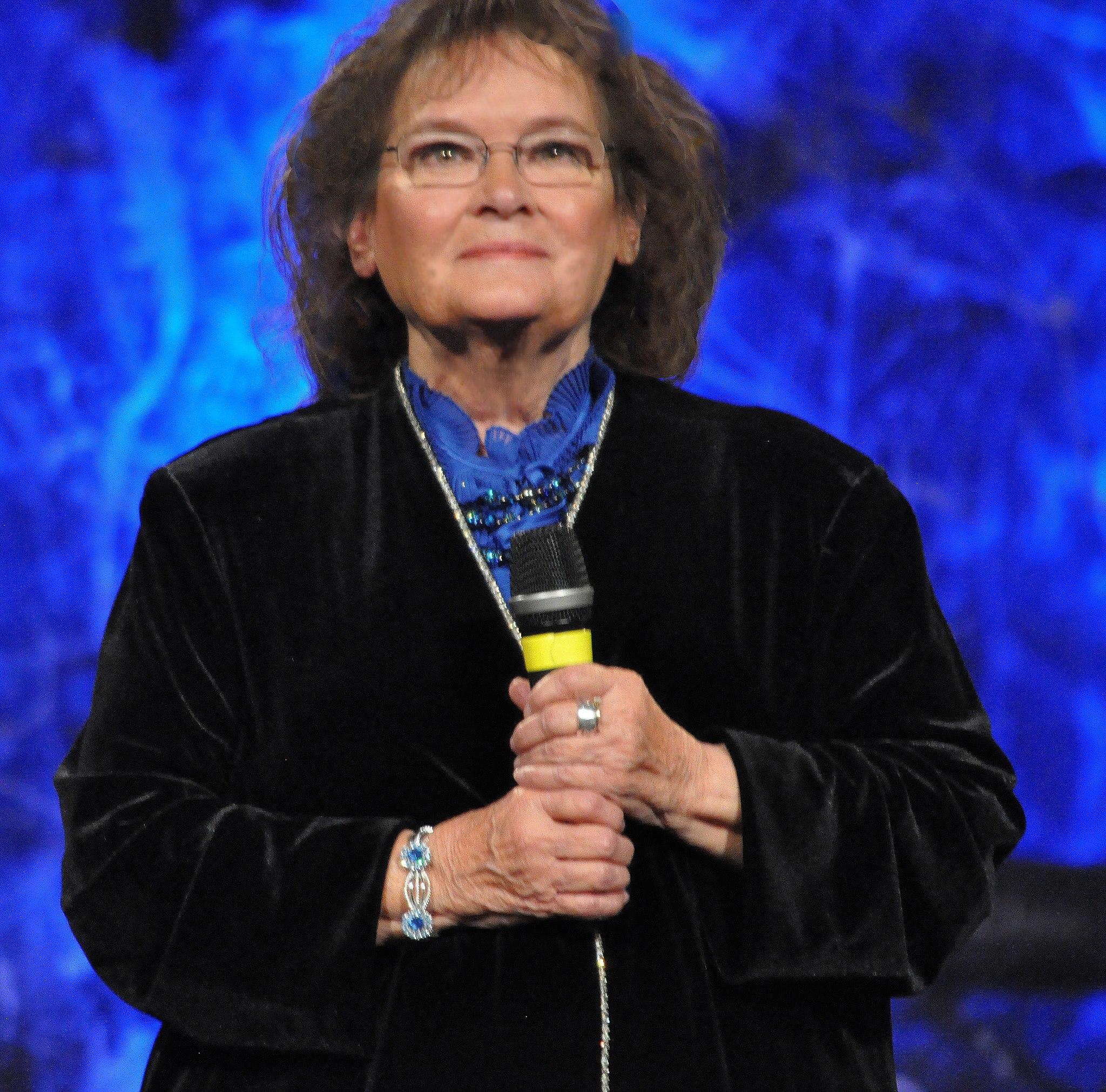
- Robinson receiving her Lifetime Achievement Award in 2013

Background information
- Born: Betty Jean Rhodes; June 17, 1933; Hyden, Kentucky, U.S.
- Origin: Kentucky, United States
- Died: November 25, 2021 (aged 88) Franklin, Tennessee, U.S.
- Genres: Country, gospel
- Occupations: Singer, songwriter
- Instrument: Vocals
- Years active: 1964–2021
- Labels: Metromedia, Decca Records, MCA records, 4 Star Records and Melody Mountain

Betty Jean Robinson (born Betty Jean Rhodes; June 17, 1933 – November 25, 2021) was an American country and Christian music singer and songwriter.

== Biography ==
Rhodes was born in Hyden, Kentucky, on the foothills of the Appalachian Mountains. She lived in poverty until she was old enough to make her way to Nashville. She married William Harold Robinson and started writing songs in the country music field. She would later be voted Billboard Magazine's songwriter of the year. Robinson was signed to Metromedia Records and later to Decca Records where she wrote many hit songs including, "All I Need is You" recorded by Dolly Parton and Porter Wagoner, and "Hello Love." recorded by Hank Snow. Robinson was also noted as a singer and did several duets with country music star Carl Belew.

== Personal life ==
Robinson lived in the hills of Tennessee on what she called Melody Mountain. She had a television program that aired regularly on the Trinity Broadcasting Network and wrote a book by the same name. Betty Jean's two daughters predeceased her – Elizabeth Kimberly Nauman (4/6/2006) and Rebecca Lynn Mullins (11/7/2009); her husband did as well. She had five grandchildren and four great-grandchildren, and continued to live in mountains of Franklin, Tennessee, until her death on November 25, 2021, at the age of 88.

== Albums ==
Robinson recorded a total of thirty-six albums and over six hundred songs. She is most noted for Christian music anthems such as "Jesus Is Alive and Well", "On the Way Home", "Ride Out Your Storm", and "He is Jehovah".

- When My Baby Sings His Song
- On Silver Wing
- Songs I Grew Up On
- Just Betty Jean Robinson
- Totally Free
- For You With Love Ride Out Your Storm
- There's Gonna Be A Singing
- To The Glory of My Father
- Singin' For Daddy
- Have Yourself A Benefit
- Christmas On Melody Mountain
- Bluegrass Gospel
- My Saviour's Precious Blood Look Up And Rejoice
- Touch Of Heaven
- Christmas Anointing
- Oh How I Love Jesus
- Appalachian Pure Sweet Peace
- Walk On
- This Good Way
- Back Home America
- A Resting Place
- Singing A New Song
- I Will Praise Him
- To Bless You
- Up On Melody Mountain For Children
- Double Blessing
- Only Jesus
- A Made Up Mind
- Hallelujah It's Jesus
- Goin' Back Home
- When I See His Face
- Thank You Lord
- Flight of a Dove
- Just For Mamma

== Television ==
Robinson started broadcasting almost immediately upon the development of the Trinity Broadcasting Network a show entitled, "Up On Melody Mountain." The program is a depiction of Robinson in what looks like her Tennessee mountain home in which she sings and shares inspirational moments with her audience.

== Awards and honors ==
Robinson has been decorated for her songwriting by various organizations. In 1968 she was named "Billboard Magazines Female Country Songwriter of the Year" for the hit song, "Baby's Back Again" performed by Connie Smith and "Hello Love" performed by Hank Snow.
