= Jimmy Murphy (country musician) =

American singer-songwriter

Jimmy Murphy (October 11, 1925, in Birmingham, Alabama – June 1, 1981) was an American country and rockabilly guitarist and singer-songwriter.

Murphy's father, a bricklayer, was a blues enthusiast, and so the young Murphy grew up listening to musicians such as Lead Belly and Blind Boy Fuller. Murphy had already made it to radio by the middle of the 1940s, appearing on local station WBRC's Happy Hal Burns Show. In 1949 he relocated to Knoxville, Tennessee and auditioned for Dinner Bell, a show on WROL hosted by Archie Campbell. Campbell had Murphy meet Chet Atkins, whom Murphy eventually gave a demo; RCA Victor subsequently signed him to a publishing deal and recorded him in January 1951 with just himself on guitar and vocals and Anita Carter playing bass.

Murphy's contract only lasted one year; all of his singles failed to sell. He continued, however, to perform on WROL, and moved to WNOX in the middle of the 1950s. In 1955, Don Law signed Murphy to Columbia Records and had him record a number of rockabilly sides, but none of these charted, and this contract ended in 1956. Murphy followed his father into the bricklaying business and continued playing music on the side, but returned in 1962 to record for Ark Records, Midnite, Loyal, Rimrock, and Starday over the next few years.

He went into retirement until the Library of Congress re-released his first single, "Electricity", on a compilation. Richard Spottswood found Murphy and asked him to begin recording again; the result was the full-length Electricity, released on Sugar Hill Records in 1978. Further recording and a tour had been planned, but Murphy died in 1981 before they could be completed. He has remained a cult figure among rockabilly enthusiasts, and in 1989 Bear Family Records collected his RCA and Columbia recordings (16 songs recorded between 1951 and 1956) and issued them on CD as Sixteen Tons Rock & Roll. 21 recordings from the 1960s were issued in 1999 on the Ace Records (UK) label under the title Southern Roots: The Legendary Starday-REM Sessions

== Singles ==
Year	Title	Record label
1951	Electricity / Mother, Where Is Your Daughter	RCA Victor
1951	Big Mama Blues / We Live A Long Long Time	RCA Victor
1951	Educated Fool / Ramblin’ Heart	RCA Victor
1952	That First Guitar Of Mine / Love That Satisfies	RCA Victor
1956	Here Kitty Kitty / I’m Looking for a Mustard Patch	Columbia Records
1956	Sixteen Tons Rock’n’Roll / My Gal Dottie	Columbia Records
1956	Grandpaw's Cat / Baboon Boogie	Columbia Records
1963 (?)	I Long To Hear Hank Sing The Blues / Swing Steel Blues	Ark Records
1963	My Feet's On Solid Ground / Wake Me Up Sweet Jesus	Ark Records
1964	My Feet's On Solid Ground / Wake Me Up Sweet Jesus	Rem Records
1964	There's No Use in My Loving You / One Block From Home	Midnite Records
1965	Half A Loaf Of Bread / Take This Message To Mother	Rem Records
19??	EP: Gonna Throw My Suitcase Away; Holy Ghost Millionaire; You May Have A Million; God's getting Worried; Half A Loaf Of Bread; The Warning Song	Loyal Records
	Put Some Meat On Them Bones; Sweet Sweet Lips	Columbia Records (not issued)
