= Something to Remember You By (Prairie Oyster song) =

Single by Prairie Oyster

from the album Different Kind of Fire
- Released: 1991
- Genre: Country
- Length: 4:37
- Label: RCA
- Songwriters: Keith Glass; Joan Besen
- Producer: Steve Berlin

Prairie Oyster singles chronology
"Lonely You, Lonely Me" (1990)	"Something to Remember You By" (1991)	"Did You Fall in Love with Me" (1991)

"Something to Remember You By" is a song recorded by Canadian country music group Prairie Oyster. It was released in 1991 as the fourth single from their second studio album, Different Kind of Fire. It peaked at number 5 on the RPM Country Tracks chart in May 1991.

== Chart performance ==
Chart (1991)	Peak position
Canada Country Singles (RPM)	5

=== Year-end charts ===
Chart (1991)	Position
Canada Country Tracks (RPM)	27
