= Only One Moon =

Studio album by Prairie Oyster
- Released: April 8, 1994 (Canada); October 10, 1995 (U.S.)
- Genre: Country
- Length: 40:26
- Label: Arista Records (Canada); Zoo Entertainment (U.S.)
- Producer: Steve Fishell; Prairie Oyster; Richard Bennett; Josh Leo

Prairie Oyster chronology
Everybody Knows (1991)	Only One Moon (1994)	Blue Plate Special (1996)

Only One Moon is the fourth studio album by Canadian country music group Prairie Oyster. It was released in Canada by Arista Records on April 8, 1994, and in the United States by Zoo Entertainment on October 10, 1995. The album peaked at number 2 on the RPM Country Albums chart. The band produced the album with Steve Fishell, except for the track "Did You Fall in Love with Me", which Josh Leo and Richard Bennett produced.

== Track listing ==
1. "Ancient History" (Bob DiPiero, John Scott Sherrill) – 2:43
2. "Louisiette" (Keith Glass) – 3:20
3. "Such a Lonely One" (Russell deCarle) – 3:29
4. "She Don't Get the Blues" (Alan Jackson, Jim McBride) – 2:51
5. "Don't Cry Little Angel" (Glass) – 4:31
6. "Price to Pay" (Lucinda Williams) – 3:18
7. "Only One Moon" (Glass) – 3:05
8. "Your Turn to Cry" (Radney Foster, Glass) – 3:04
9. "Always Believing" (Dave Romeo, Pam Tillis) – 3:32
10. "Brand New Hard Time Blues" (Joan Besen) – 3:22
11. "Black-Eyed Susan" (Besen, Ron Hynes) – 3:30
12. "All Fall Down" (Glass) – 3:41

On American presses of the album, "Always Believing" is replaced with "Did You Fall in Love with Me" (Richard Bennett, Josh Leo) — 3:19

== Personnel ==
Compiled from liner notes.

=== Prairie Oyster ===
- John P. Allen — fiddle, mandolin, acoustic guitar, background vocals
- Joan Besen — piano, organ, background vocals
- Russell deCarle — bass guitar, lead vocals
- Dennis Delorme — pedal steel guitar
- Keith Glass — electric guitar, acoustic guitar, electric sitar, background vocals
- Bruce Moffet — drums, percussion

=== Additional musicians ===
- Richard Bennett — acoustic guitar
- Dan Dugmore — acoustic guitar
- Bill Hullett — acoustic guitar
- Roy Huskey, Jr. — upright bass on "Your Turn to Cry"
- Jo-El Sonnier — accordion on "Price to Pay" and "Lousiette"

=== Technical ===
- Chuck Ainlay — mixing
- Richard Bennett — producer
- Steve Fishell — producer
- Josh Leo — producer
- Justin Niebank — mixing
- Mike Poole — recording, mixing
- Prairie Oyster — producer

== Chart performance ==
Chart (1994)	Peak position
Canadian RPM Country Albums	2
Canadian RPM Top Albums	34
