= Songs of Tragedy =

Studio album by Hank Snow
- Released: 1964
- Genre: Country
- Label: RCA Victor
- Producer: Chet Atkins

Hank Snow chronology
Railroad Man (1963)	Songs of Tragedy (1964)	Hank Snow Sings Your Favorite Country Hits (1965)

Songs of Tragedy is a studio album by country music singer Hank Snow. It was released in 1964 by RCA Victor (catalog LSP-2901). The album was produced by Chet Atkins. It is built around the concept of tragedy, focusing on "prisoners praying for redemption and war-weary soldiers."

The album debuted on Billboard magazine's country album chart on January 18, 1964, peaked at No. 7, and remained on the chart for a total of 26 weeks. It included two Top 10 hits: "The Last Ride" (No. 3) and "Big Wheels" (No. 7).

AllMusic gave the album a rating of three stars.

== Track listing ==
Side A

1. "The Prisoner's Song"
2. "The Color Song"
3. "The Answer to Little Blossom"
4. "There's a Star Spangled Banner Waving Somewhere"
5. "Walking the Last Mile"
6. "Old Rover"

Side B

1. "The Prisoner's Dream"
2. "Put Your Arms Around Me"
3. "Your Little Band of Gold"
4. "Rocking Alone in an Old Rocking Chair"
5. "Mother I Thank You (For the Bible You Gave)"
6. "Little Joe"
