= Different Kind of Fire =

Studio album by Prairie Oyster
- Released: April 10, 1990
- Genre: Country
- Label: RCA Nashville
- Producer: Steve Berlin

Prairie Oyster chronology
| Oyster Tracks (1986) | Different Kind of Fire (1990) | Everybody Knows (1991) |

Professional ratings
Review scores
| Source | Rating |
|---|---|
| Allmusic | 4/5 stars |

Different Kind of Fire is the second studio album by Canadian country music group Prairie Oyster. It was released by RCA Nashville on April 10, 1990, and served as their debut album in the United States. The album peaked at number 65 on the RPM Top Albums chart and number 61 on the Billboard Top Country Albums chart.

== Track listing ==
1. "Wild About Me" (Josh Leo, Gregg Sutton) - 3:19
2. "Something to Remember You By" (Keith Glass, Joan Besen) - 4:37
3. "Lonely You, Lonely Me" (Besen) - 3:17
4. "Meet Me on the Corner" (Glass) - 4:32
5. "Goodbye, So Long, Hello" (Russell deCarle, Willie P. Bennett) - 3:05
6. "But You Said" (Glass) - 4:10
7. "I Don't Hurt Anymore" (Jack Rollins, Don Robertson) - 2:55
8. "You Changed Your Mind" (Glass) - 2:44
9. "Different Kind of Fire" (Besen) - 4:14
10. "If I Could Take My Own Advice" (Bennett) - 4:06

"If I Could Take My Own Advice" only appears on the CD version.

== Chart performance ==
| Chart (1990) | Peak position |
|---|---|
| Canadian RPM Top Albums | 65 |
| U.S. Billboard Top Country Albums | 61 |
