= One Way Track =

Single by Prairie Oyster

from the album Blue Plate Special
- Released: 1996
- Genre: Country
- Length: 5:38
- Label: Velvel
- Songwriters: Willie P. Bennett; Russell deCarle
- Producers: Mike Poole; Prairie Oyster

Prairie Oyster singles chronology
"Unbelievable Love" (1996)	"One Way Track" (1996)	"She Won't Be Lonely Long" (1997)

"One Way Track" is a song recorded by Canadian country music group Prairie Oyster. It was released in 1996 as the second single from their fifth studio album, Blue Plate Special. It peaked at number 4 on the RPM Country Tracks chart in March 1997.

== Chart performance ==
Chart (1996–1997)	Peak position
Canada Country Singles (RPM)	4

=== Year-end charts ===
Chart (1997)	Position
Canada Country Tracks (RPM)	35
