= What Is This Country? =

Studio album by Prairie Oyster
- Released: November 10, 1998
- Genre: Country
- Label: ViK. Recordings
- Producer: Mike Poole; Prairie Oyster

Prairie Oyster chronology
Blue Plate Special (1996)	What Is This Country? (1998)	String of Pearls: A Greatest Hits Collection (2000)

What Is This Country? is the sixth studio album by Canadian country music group Prairie Oyster. It was released by ViK. Recordings on November 10, 1998. The album peaked at number 11 on the RPM Country Albums chart.

Randy Bachman played guitar on the first track, "Canadian Sunrise."

== Track listing ==
1. "Canadian Sunrise"
2. "Why Are We Holding On To Nothing"
3. "Baby Don't Come 'Round Here Anymore"
4. "No Love Have I"
5. "Blue Melody"
6. "Barroom Girls"
7. "Heaven or Bust"
8. "One of Those Nights"
9. "Keep On Dreaming"
10. "Vine Is Doing Better Than the Tree"
11. "Change with Time"
12. "Mean Streak"
13. "Canadian Sunset"

== Chart performance ==
Chart (1998)	Peak position
Canadian RPM Country Albums	11
