= Blue Plate Special (Prairie Oyster album) =

Studio album by Prairie Oyster
- Released: August 28, 1996
- Genre: Country
- Length: 41:38
- Label: Velvel
- Producers: Mike Poole; Prairie Oyster

Prairie Oyster chronology
Only One Moon (1994)	Blue Plate Special (1996)	What Is This Country? (1998)

Blue Plate Special is the fifth studio album by Canadian country music group Prairie Oyster. It was released by Velvel Records on August 28, 1996. The album peaked at number 5 on the RPM Country Albums chart.

== Track listing ==
1. "She Won't Be Lonely Long" (Keith Glass) – 3:31
2. "What'cha Gonna Do?" (Glass) – 3:37
3. "The Water's Deep" (Russell deCarle) – 4:11
4. "If My Broken Heart Would Ever Mend" (Joan Besen) – 2:38
5. "Tonight There's a Blue Moon" (deCarle) – 4:57
6. "Long Gone Daddy" (John Paul Daniel, Glass) – 3:07
7. "In the Summertime (You Don't Want My Love)" (Roger Miller) – 2:34
8. "Unbelievable Love" (Besen) – 3:32
9. "Sunday Driver" (John P. Allen) – 0:55
10. "There She Goes" (Besen) – 3:33
11. "One Way Track" (Willie P. Bennett, deCarle) – 5:38
12. "Into the Blue" (Glass) – 3:25

== Chart performance ==
Chart (1996)	Peak position
Canadian RPM Country Albums	5
