= Will I Do (Till the Real Thing Comes Along) =

Single by Prairie Oyster

from the album Everybody Knows
- B-side: "Am I That Easy to Forget"
- Released: March 1992
- Genre: Country
- Length: 2:44
- Label: RCA
- Songwriter: Joan Besen
- Producers: Richard Bennett; Josh Leo

Prairie Oyster singles chronology
"One Precious Love" (1991)	"Will I Do (Till the Real Thing Comes Along)" (1992)	"Everybody Knows" (1992)

"Will I Do (Till the Real Thing Comes Along)" is a song recorded by Canadian country music group Prairie Oyster. It was released in March 1992 as the third single from their third studio album, Everybody Knows. It peaked at number 10 on the RPM Country Tracks chart in July 1992.

== Chart performance ==
Chart (1992)	Peak position
Canada Country Singles (RPM)	10

=== Year-end charts ===
Chart (1992)	Position
Canada Country Tracks (RPM)	88
