= Louisiette =

Single by Prairie Oyster

from the album Only One Moon
- Released: 1994
- Genre: Country
- Length: 3:20
- Label: Arista
- Songwriter: Keith Glass
- Producers: Steve Fishell; Prairie Oyster

Prairie Oyster singles chronology
"Such a Lonely One" (1994)	"Louisiette" (1994)	"Black-Eyed Susan" (1994)

"Louisiette" is a song recorded by Canadian country music group Prairie Oyster. It was released in 1994 as the second single from their fourth studio album, Only One Moon. It peaked at number 4 on the RPM Country Tracks chart in October 1994.

== Chart performance ==
Chart (1994)	Peak position
Canada Adult Contemporary (RPM)	25
Canada Country Singles (RPM)	4

=== Year-end charts ===
Chart (1994)	Position
Canada Country Tracks (RPM)	33
