= Anita Carter =

American singer-songwriter

- Anita Carter in 1977

Background information
- Born: Ina Anita Carter; March 31, 1933; Maces Spring, Virginia, US
- Died: July 29, 1999 (aged 66) Hendersonville, Tennessee, U.S.
- Genres: Country, folk
- Occupation: Singer-songwriter
- Instruments: Bass, 12-string guitar, autoharp, vocals
- Labels: RCA Victor, Cadence, Columbia, Audiograph, United Artists, Liberty, Capitol, House of Cash
- Formerly of: Carter Family, The Carter Sisters

Ina Anita Carter (March 31, 1933 – July 29, 1999) was an American singer who played upright bass, guitar, and autoharp. She performed with her sisters, Helen and June, and her mother, Maybelle, initially under the name The Carter Sisters and Mother Maybelle. Carter had three top 10 hits as well as other charting singles. She was the first to record the songs "Blue Boy" and "Ring of Fire". Carter was also a songwriter, most notably co-writing the Johnny Cash hit "Rosanna's Going Wild."

Carter recorded for a number of labels, both as a solo artist and with her family, including RCA Victor, Cadence, Columbia, Audiograph, United Artists, Liberty and Capitol.

== Biography ==
Anita was the third daughter of Ezra and Maybelle Carter. Born in Maces Spring, Virginia, she scored two top 10 hits in 1951 with "Down the Trail of Achin' Hearts" and "Bluebird Island," both duets with Hank Snow. In 1962, she recorded "Love's Ring of Fire," written by her sister June and Merle Kilgore. After the song failed to make the charts, Johnny Cash recorded it as "Ring of Fire" in March 1963 with the horns and the Carter Sisters (along with Mother Maybelle). This version became a hit for Cash.

She reached the top 10 again in 1968 with "I Got You," a duet with Waylon Jennings. Carter also reached the top 50 with hits like "I'm Gonna Leave You" in 1966 and "Tulsa County" in 1971.

On March 26, 1952, she appeared on The Kate Smith Evening Hour with her family band The Carter Sisters and Mother Maybelle as the first women to represent hillbilly/country music and Music City Nashville on national television. On April 23, she returned to the program, where she performed a duet with Hank Williams, on his song "I Can't Help It (If I'm Still in Love with You)". Then on May 21, she became the first female star of the Grand Ole Opry to sing a solo on The Kate Smith Evening Hour when she sang "Just When I Needed You".

=== Marriages ===
Carter married fiddler Dale Potter in 1950 (marriage was annulled shortly thereafter), session musician Don Davis in 1953 (divorced and then remarried), and Bob Wootton (lead guitarist for Johnny Cash's band The Tennessee Three) in 1974 (divorced). She had two children.

=== Death ===
Carter suffered from rheumatoid arthritis for many years, and the drugs used to treat it severely damaged her pancreas, kidneys, and liver. She died on July 29, 1999 at the age of 66, a year after eldest sister Helen and four years before middle sister June. She was under hospice care at the home of Johnny and June Carter Cash in Hendersonville, Tennessee. Her interment was in Hendersonville Memory Gardens in Hendersonville, Tennessee.

=== Album discography apart from Carter Family ===
Albums	Label	Date
"Blue Doll" (Single)	Cadence Records – 1333	1957
Together Again (with Hank Snow)	RCA Victor LSPLSP – 2580	Nov. 1962
Folk Songs Old and New	Mercury SR – 60770	Dec. 1962
Anita Carter of the Carter Family	Mercury SR – 60847	Feb. 1964
So Much Love	Capitol ST – 11075	1972
Yesterday	House Of Cash HOC – 1000	1995
Appalachian Angel: Her Recordings 1950–1972 & 1996	Bear Family Records	June 22, 2004

=== Singles chart activity apart from Carter Family ===
Year	Title	US CW	Comments
1950	"Somebody's Cryin'"	N/A	
1951	"Down the Trail of Achin' Hearts"/" Bluebird Island"	2	duet with Hank Snow
1951	"Down the Trail of Achin' Hearts"/" Bluebird Island"	4	duet with Hank Snow
1953	"There'll Be No Teardrops Tonight"	N/A	
1955	"Pledging my Love"	N/A	as part of 'Nita, Rita & Ruby
1955	"That's What Makes the Jukebox Play"	N/A	
1955	"Making Believe"	N/A	
1955	"False Hearted"	N/A	
1956	"Keep Your Promise, Willie Thomas"	N/A	duet with Hank Snow
1956	"A Tear Fell"	N/A	
1956	"Believe It Or Not"	N/A	
1957	"Blue Doll"	N/A	
1957	"He's a Real Gone Guy"	N/A	
1960	"Mama (Don't Cry at My Wedding)"	N/A	
1960	"Tryin' to Forget About You"	N/A	
1963	"Ring of Fire"	N/A	
1963	"Running Back"	N/A	
1964	"Little Things Mean a Lot"	N/A	
1965	"Twelve O'Clock High"	N/A	
1966	"You Couldn't Get My Love Back (If You Tried)"/" I'm Gonna Leave You"	N/A	
1966	"You Couldn't Get My Love Back (If You Tried)"/" I'm Gonna Leave You"	44	
1966	"I've Heard The Wind Blow Before"	N/A	
1967	"Love Me Now (While I Am Living)"	61	
1967	"You Weren't Ashamed to Kiss Me (Last Night)"	N/A	
1968	"I Got You"	4	duet with Waylon Jennings
1968	"Cry Softly"	N/A	
1968	"To Be a Child Again"	65	
1969	"Coming of the Roads"	50	duet with Johnny Darrell
1970	"Tulsa County"	41	
1971	"Lovin' Him Was Easier"/" A Whole Lotta Lovin'"	N/A	
1971	"Lovin' Him Was Easier"/" A Whole Lotta Lovin'"	61	

== Selected studio and guest artist appearances ==
Year	Artist & Title (album unless otherwise noted)	Peak Chart Position	Comments
1949	Chet Atkins: "Main Street Breakdown" (single)	NA	played bass
1951	Jimmy Murphy singles including "Electricity", "Mother Where is Your Daughter Tonight", others	na	played bass, she and Murphy were the sole musicians on these sessions
1960	Connie Smith: Cute 'n' Country	1	backing vocals
1963	Johnny Cash with the Carter Family: Blood, Sweat and Tears	80	duet on "Another Man Done Gone"
1966	Connie Smith: Great Sacred Songs	19	backing vocals
1967	Porter Wagoner: Soul of a Convict & Other Great Prison Songs	7	backing vocals
1967	Porter Wagoner: Cold Hard Facts of Life	4	backing vocals
1968	Porter Wagoner: Bottom of the Bottle	19	backing vocals
1968	Porter Wagoner & Dolly Parton: Just Between You & Me	8	backing vocals; lead vocal on chorus of 1967 single "The Last Thing on My Mind"
1968	Porter Wagoner & Dolly Parton: Just the Two of Us	5	backing vocals
1968	Dolly Parton: Just Because I'm a Woman	22	backing vocals
1969	Porter Wagoner & Dolly Parton: Always, Always	5	backing vocals
1969	Waylon Jennings: Just to Satisfy You	7	two duet vocals
1970	Porter Wagoner & Dolly Parton: Porter Wayne & Dolly Rebecca	4	backing vocals
1980	Porter Wagoner & Dolly Parton: single "Making Plans"	2	backing vocals on original recording, 1968
1987	Johnny Cash: Johnny Cash Is Coming to Town	36	backing vocals with the Carter Family
1991	Johnny Cash: The Mystery of Life	70	backing vocals
