= Canadian Sunrise =

Single by Prairie Oyster

from the album What Is This Country?
- Released: 1998
- Genre: Country
- Label: ViK. Recordings
- Songwriter: Joan Besen
- Producers: Mike Poole; Prairie Oyster

Prairie Oyster singles chronology
"Tonight There's a Blue Moon" (1997)	"Canadian Sunrise" (1998)	"Keep On Dreaming" (1999)

"Canadian Sunrise" is a song recorded by Canadian country music group Prairie Oyster. It was released in 1998 as the first single from their sixth studio album, What Is This Country?. It peaked at number 5 on the RPM Country Tracks chart in December 1998.

== Chart performance ==
Chart (1998)	Peak position
Canada Country Singles (RPM)	5

=== Year-end charts ===
Chart (1998)	Position
Canada Country Tracks (RPM)	73

Chart (1999)	Position
Canada Country Tracks (RPM)	92
