= Michelle Josef =

Canadian musician and transgender activist

Michelle Josef (born March 21, 1953), formerly Bohdan Hluszko, is a Canadian musician and transgender activist.

Under her former name, Josef was already established as one of Canada's leading session drummers, and has continued her career in music. She has appeared on albums by Prairie Oyster, Doug Sahm, Jo-El Sonnier, Wild Strawberries, Sylvia Tyson, Long John Baldry, Scott B. Sympathy, Big Rude Jake, Sharon, Lois and Bram, and David Wilcox. She is a member of Canadian roots super group Hey Stella!

In 1998, she received a Canadian Country Music Award for drummer of the year.
