= Ae Fond Kiss =

Ae Fond Kiss may refer to:

- "Ae Fond Kiss" (song), song with lyrics by Robert Burns
- Ae Fond Kiss ... (film), 2004 romantic film
- Ay Fond Kiss, 1990 studio album by Fairground Attraction
