= The Gold Rush Is Over =

Single by Hank Snow

from the album The Singing Ranger
- B-side: "Why Do You Punish Me (For Loving You)"
- Released: 1952
- Recorded: 1951
- Genre: Country
- Length: 2:17
- Label: RCA Victor
- Songwriter: Cindy Walker

Hank Snow singles chronology
| "Music Makin' Mama from Memphis" (1951) | "The Gold Rush Is Over" (1952) | "Lady's Man" (1952) |

"The Gold Rush Is Over" is a song written by Cindy Walker, sung by Hank Snow, and released on the RCA Victor label (catalog no. 20–4522). In April 1952, it peaked at No. 2 on Billboard's country and western juke box chart (No. 4 best seller and jockey). It spent 18 weeks on the charts and was ranked No. 10 on Billboard's 1952 year-end country and western juke box chart and No. 13 on the year-end best seller chart.

== See also ==
- Billboard Top Country & Western Records of 1952
