= Oyster Tracks =

Studio album by Prairie Oyster
- Released: 1986
- Genre: Country
- Label: Stony Plain

Prairie Oyster chronology
Oyster Tracks (1986)	Different Kind of Fire (1990)

Oyster Tracks is the debut album by Canadian country music band Prairie Oyster. It was released by Stony Plain Records in 1986. Singles released from the album include "Rain Rain," "You Got a Way," "Give It a Little More Time," "Juke Joint Johnny," "Man in the Moon" and "Play Me Some Honky Tonk Music."

== Track listing ==
1. "You Got a Way"
2. "Rain Rain"
3. "Play Me Some Honky Tonk Music" (George Hawke)
4. "I'm Learning"
5. "Juke Joint Johnny"
6. "Man in the Moon"
7. "Tom Cat"
8. "Give It a Little More Time"
9. "Other Side of Town"
