= Black-Eyed Susan (song) =

Single by Prairie Oyster

from the album Only One Moon
- Released: 1994
- Genre: Country
- Length: 3:30
- Label: Arista
- Songwriters: Joan Besen; Ron Hynes
- Producers: Steve Fishell; Prairie Oyster

Prairie Oyster singles chronology
"Louisiette" (1994)	"Black-Eyed Susan" (1994)	"Don't Cry Little Angel" (1995)

"Black-Eyed Susan" is a song recorded by Canadian country music group Prairie Oyster. It was released in 1994 as the third single from their fourth studio album, Only One Moon, which was released in Canada in April 1994, and in the U. S. in October 1995. It peaked at number 7 on the RPM Country Tracks chart in January 1995.

== Chart performance ==
Chart (1994–1995)	Peak position
Canada Country Singles (RPM)	7

=== Year-end charts ===
Chart (1995)	Position
Canada Country Tracks (RPM)	100
