= Don't Cry Little Angel =

Single by Prairie Oyster

from the album Only One Moon
- Released: 1995
- Genre: Country
- Length: 4:31
- Label: Arista
- Songwriter: Keith Glass
- Producer: Steve Fishell

Prairie Oyster singles chronology
| "Black-Eyed Susan" (1994) | "Don't Cry Little Angel" (1995) | "Only One Moon" (1995) |

"Don't Cry Little Angel" is a single by Canadian country music group Prairie Oyster. Released in 1995, it was the fourth single from their fourth studio album Only One Moon. The song reached #1 on the RPM Country Tracks chart in May 1995.

== Chart performance ==
| Chart (1995) | Peak position |
|---|---|
| Canada Country Singles (RPM) | 1 |

=== Year-end charts ===
| Chart (1995) | Position |
|---|---|
| Canada Country Tracks (RPM) | 33 |
