= One Precious Love =

Single by Prairie Oyster

from the album Everybody Knows
- B-side: "Goodbye Lonesome"
- Released: December 1991
- Genre: Country
- Length: 2:10
- Label: RCA
- Songwriter: Joan Besen
- Producers: Richard Bennett; Josh Leo

Prairie Oyster singles chronology
"Did You Fall in Love with Me" (1991)	"One Precious Love" (1991)	"Will I Do (Till the Real Thing Comes Along)" (1992)

"One Precious Love" is a song recorded by Canadian country music group Prairie Oyster. It was released in December 1991 as the second single from their third studio album, Everybody Knows. It peaked at number 8 on the RPM Country Tracks chart in March 1992.

== Chart performance ==
Chart (1991–1992)	Peak position
Canada Country Singles (RPM)	8
US Hot Country Songs (Billboard)	51

=== Year-end charts ===
Chart (1992)	Position
Canada Country Tracks (RPM)	66
