= Everybody Knows (Prairie Oyster song) =

Single by Prairie Oyster

from the album Everybody Knows
- Released: 1992
- Genre: Country
- Length: 2:47
- Label: RCA
- Songwriters: Keith Glass; Paul Kennerley
- Producers: Richard Bennett; Josh Leo

Prairie Oyster singles chronology
"Will I Do (Till the Real Thing Comes Along)" (1992)	"Everybody Knows" (1992)	"Here's to You" (1992)

"Everybody Knows" is a song recorded by Canadian country music group Prairie Oyster. It was released in 1992 as the fourth single from their third studio album, Everybody Knows. It peaked at number 8 on the RPM Country Tracks chart in October 1992.

== Chart performance ==
Chart (1992)	Peak position
Canada Country Singles (RPM)	8

=== Year-end charts ===
Chart (1992)	Position
Canada Country Tracks (RPM)	87
