= Did You Fall in Love with Me =

Single by Prairie Oyster

from the album Everybody Knows
- Released: 1991
- Genre: Country
- Length: 3:36
- Label: RCA
- Songwriter: Joan Besen
- Producers: Richard Bennett; Josh Leo

Prairie Oyster singles chronology
"Something to Remember You By" (1991)	"Did You Fall in Love with Me" (1991)	"One Precious Love" (1991)

"Did You Fall in Love with Me" is a song recorded by Canadian country music group Prairie Oyster. It was released in 1991 as the first single from their third studio album, Everybody Knows, released on September 19, 1991, by RCA Nashville. The song peaked at number 7 on the RPM Country Tracks chart in December 1991.

== Chart performance ==
Chart (1991)	Peak position
Canada Country Singles (RPM)	7

=== Year-end charts ===
Chart (1991)	Position
Canada Country Tracks (RPM)	100
