= Everybody Knows (Prairie Oyster album) =

Studio album by Prairie Oyster
- Released: September 19, 1991
- Studios: Metalworks Studios, Mississauga, Ontario
- Genre: Country
- Length: 28:40
- Label: RCA Nashville
- Producers: Richard Bennett; Josh Leo

Prairie Oyster chronology
Different Kind of Fire (1990)	Everybody Knows (1991)	Only One Moon (1994)

Professional ratings
Review scores
Source	Rating
Allmusic	4.5/5 stars

Everybody Knows is the third studio album by Canadian country music group Prairie Oyster and was released on September 19, 1991, by RCA Nashville. The album was named Album of the Year by the Canadian Country Music Association in 1992.

== Track listing ==
1. "Will I Do (Till the Real Thing Comes Along)" (Joan Besen) - 2:44
2. "One Precious Love" (Besen) - 2:10
3. "Can't Say Goodbye" (Russell deCarle) - 2:54
4. "Am I That Easy to Forget" (Carl Belew, W.S. Stevenson) - 2:40
5. "Just for Old Times Sake" (Hank Hunter, Jack Keller) - 2:46
6. "Everybody Knows" (Keith Glass, Paul Kennerley) - 2:47
7. "Here's to You" (James House, Kostas) - 2:52
8. "Did You Fall in Love with Me" (Besen) - 3:36
9. "I Think That We Did Something" (Jack DeKeyser) - 3:19
10. "Goodbye Lonesome (Hello, Baby Doll)" (Lee Emerson) - 2:32

== Personnel ==
- John P. Allen – acoustic guitar, fiddle, mandolin, background vocals
- Richard Bennett – guitar, producer
- Joan Besen – piano, background vocals
- Russell de Carle – electric bass, vocals
- Dennis Delorme – pedal steel guitar
- Keith Glass – acoustic guitar, electric guitar, vocals
- Josh Leo – guitar, producer
- Bruce Moffett – percussion, drums

=== Production ===
- Mary Hamilton – art direction
- Jeff Giedt – assistant
- Steve Marcantonio – engineer, mixing
- Denny Purcell – mastering
- Señor McGuire – photography
- Ed Stone – engineer
- L. Stuart Young – assistant

== Chart performance ==
Chart (1992)	Peak position
Canadian RPM Country Albums	6
