= Down the Trail of Achin' Hearts =

Song by Hank Snow, Anita Carter
- Released: 1951
- Genre: Country
- Length: 2:12
- Label: RCA Victor
- Songwriter(s): Jimmy Kennedy, Nat Simon

"Down the Trail of Achin' Hearts" is a country music song written by Jimmy Kennedy and Nat Simon, recorded by Hank Snow and Anita Carter, and released on the RCA Victor label. In May 1951, it reached No. 2 on the US country charts. It spent 14 weeks on the chart and was the No. 12 country record of 1951 based on juke box plays.

The song was also covered by Patti Page.

== See also ==
- List of Billboard Top Country & Western Records of 1951
