= Bluebird Island =

Song by Hank Snow, Anita Carter
- Released: 1951
- Genre: Country
- Length: 2:39
- Label: RCA Victor
- Songwriter(s): Hank Snow

"Bluebird Island" is a country music song written by Hank Snow, recorded by Snow and Anita Carter, and released on the RCA Victor label. In April 1951, it reached No. 4 on the country charts. It spent 11 weeks on the charts and was the No. 18 best selling country record of 1951.

== See also ==
- List of Billboard Top Country & Western Records of 1951
