= Railroad Man (album) =

Studio album by Hank Snow
- Released: 1963
- Genre: Country
- Label: RCA Victor

Hank Snow chronology
I've Been Everywhere (1963)	Railroad Man (1963)	Songs of Tragedy (1964)

Railroad Man is a studio album by country music singer Hank Snow. It was released in 1963 by RCA Victor (catalog LSP-2705).

The album debuted on Billboard magazine's country album chart on January 18, 1964, peaked at No. 7, and remained on the chart for a total of 26 weeks. It included two Top 10 hits: "The Last Ride" (No. 3) and "Big Wheels" (No. 7).

== Track listing ==
Side A

1. "Waiting for a Train" (Jimmie Rodgers)
2. "Big Wheels" (Clovis Yamall)
3. "The Last Ride" (Ted Daffan)
4. "The Streamline Cannonball" (Roy Acuff)
5. "Ghost Trains" (Famous Lashua)
6. "Pan American" (Hank Williams)

Side B

1. "Southbound" (Ned Miller)
2. "Way Out There" (Bob Nolan)
3. "Chattanooga Choo Choo" (Mack Gordon, Harry Warren)
4. "The Wreck of the Number Nine" (Carson Robison)
5. "Lonesome Whistle" (Jimmie Davis, Hank Williams)
6. "The Crazy Engineer" (Joe Steen)
