= Such a Lonely One =

Single by Prairie Oyster

from the album Only One Moon
- Released: 1994
- Genre: Country
- Length: 3:29
- Label: Arista
- Songwriter: Russell deCarle
- Producers: Steve Fishell; Prairie Oyster

Prairie Oyster singles chronology
"Just for Old Time's Sake" (1993)	"Such a Lonely One" (1994)	"Louisiette" (1994)

"Such a Lonely One" is a single by Canadian country music group Prairie Oyster. Released in 1994, it was the first single from their fourth studio album Only One Moon. The song reached #1 on the RPM Country Tracks chart in June 1994.

== Chart performance ==
Chart (1994)	Peak position
Canada Adult Contemporary (RPM)	6
Canada Country Singles (RPM)	1

=== Year-end charts ===
Chart (1994)	Position
Canada Adult Contemporary Tracks (RPM)	53
Canada Country Tracks (RPM)	21
