= Unbelievable Love =

Single by Prairie Oyster

from the album Blue Plate Special
- Released: 1996
- Genre: Country
- Length: 3:32
- Label: Velvel
- Songwriter: Joan Besen
- Producers: Mike Poole; Prairie Oyster

Prairie Oyster singles chronology
"Ancient History" (1995)	"Unbelievable Love" (1996)	"One Way Track" (1996)

"Unbelievable Love" is a single by Canadian country music group Prairie Oyster. Released in 1996, it was the first single from their album Blue Plate Special. The song reached #1 on the RPM Country Tracks chart in November 1996.

== Chart performance ==
Chart (1996)	Peak position
Canada Adult Contemporary (RPM)	28
Canada Country Singles (RPM)	1

=== Year-end charts ===
Chart (1996)	Position
Canada Country Tracks (RPM)	9
