= One Kiss (album) =

Studio album by Prairie Oyster
- Released: August 22, 2006
- Recorded: at Metalworks Studios in Mississauga, Ontario
- Genre: Country
- Length: 42:10
- Label: Open Road
- Producer: Prairie Oyster

Prairie Oyster chronology
String of Pearls: A Greatest Hits Collection (2000)	One Kiss (2006)

One Kiss is the seventh studio album by Canadian country music group Prairie Oyster. It was released by Open Road Recordings on August 22, 2006. "Sweet Sweet Girl to Me," "Too Bad for Me," "I Threw It All Away," "One Kiss" and "Open Up Your Heart" were released as singles. One Kiss is the band's first fully self-produced album. The band worked on the album at guitarist Keith Glass' home in Ontario.

== Track listing ==
1. "That's My Home" (Levon Helm, Malcolm Rebennack) – 3:15
2. "Too Bad for Me" (Steve Pineo) – 2:51
3. "One Kiss" (Keith Glass) – 4:25
4. "Open Up Your Heart" (Russell deCarle, Glass) – 3:12
5. "Long and Lonesome Old Freight Train" (Cris Cuddy) – 4:20
6. "I Threw It All Away" (Bob Dylan) – 3:32
7. "Sweet, Sweet Girl to Me" (Don Gibson) – 2:39
8. "Drown Your Sorrows" (Joan Besen) – 3:04
9. "Mona Lisa" (Ray Evans, Jay Livingston) – 3:17
10. "I Wish I'd Never Known Love" (Besen) – 2:45
11. "Short Time Here" (Besen) – 3:53
12. "Heaven or Baton Rouge" (Robert David, deCarle) – 4:57
