= Hello Love (song) =

Single by Hank Snow

from the album Hello Love
- B-side: "Until the End of Time"
- Released: January 1974
- Recorded: September 26, 1973
- Genre: Country
- Length: 2:44
- Label: RCA Records 47-8072
- Songwriter(s): Aileen Mnich, Betty Jean Robinson
- Producer(s): Chet Atkins and Ronny Light

Hank Snow singles chronology
| "North to Chicago" (1973) | "Hello Love" (1974) | "That's You and Me" (1974) |

"Hello Love" is a 1974 single by Hank Snow. "Hello Love" was Snow's seventh and final number one on the U.S. country singles chart, and his first number one in twelve years. The single stayed at number one for a single week and spent a total of ten weeks on the chart.

When "Hello Love" peaked in popularity, Snow (at 59 years, 11 months) became the oldest singer to have a No. 1 song on the Billboard Hot Country Singles chart. The record stood for more than 26 years, until Kenny Rogers (at 61 years, 9 months), eclipsed the record with "Buy Me a Rose".

== In the media ==
From 1974 to 1987, the song was the theme to A Prairie Home Companion.

== Chart performance ==
| Chart (1974) | Peak position |
|---|---|
| U.S. Billboard Hot Country Singles | 1 |
| Canadian RPM Country Tracks | 1 |
