= Lady's Man (Hank Snow song) =

Song by Hank Snow
- B-side: "Married By The Bible, Divorced By The Law"
- Released: 1952
- Genre: Country
- Label: RCA Victor
- Songwriter(s): Cy Coben

"Lady's Man" is a country music song written by Cy Coben, recorded by Hank Snow, and released on the RCA Victor label (catalog no. 58-0238-A). The "B" side was "Married By The Bible, Divorced By The Law".

It debuted on Billboard magazine's country and western charts in July 1952, peaked at No. 2, and spent 14 weeks on the charts. In Billboard' year-end chart for 1952, it ranked No. 21 among the best selling country and western records.
