= Jenny Whiteley =

Canadian singer-songwriter

- Born: January 14, 1971 (age 55)
- Origin: Toronto, Ontario, Canada
- Genres: Country, folk
- Occupations: Singer, songwriter
- Instruments: Vocals, guitar
- Years active: 1976–present
- Labels: MapleMusic, Black Hen
- Website: www.jennywhiteley.com

Jenny Whiteley is a Canadian country and folk singer-songwriter. She was a member of the band Heartbreak Hill, and released several solo albums of folk music. She has won two Juno Awards for her music.

== Early life and family ==
Whiteley grew up in Toronto. She is the daughter of blues musician Chris Whiteley and his wife Mary Tough. Her brother is Dan Whiteley, who is also a folk musician and singer, and her uncle is folk musician Ken Whiteley.

== Career ==
She began her musical career as a child, recording with Canadian children's musician Raffi along with her brother Dan.

In the 1990s she performed with the bluegrass band Heartbreak Hill. Just prior to that band's breakup, she released her self-titled debut album in 2001, and followed up with Hopetown in 2004. Both albums won the Juno Award for Best Roots & Traditional Album of the Year. She has released three more albums since: Dear, Forgive or Forget and The Original Jenny Whiteley, all getting good reviews. Her last four records have been released through Black Hen Music. Steve Dawson produced Hopetown, Dear and Forgive or Forget.

She has also collaborated with Sarah Harmer, Amy Millan, Carolyn Mark and Riley Baugus.

== Personal life ==
Whiteley moved from Toronto to a country home near Elphin, Ontario in eastern Ontario with her musician husband, Joey Wright (b. October 9, 1973), in January 2002. She and Joey have two daughters, Lila (born April 16, 2003) and Audrey (born September 18, 2007).

== Discography ==
=== With Heartbreak Hill ===
- Heartbreak Hill (1998)

=== Solo ===
- Jenny Whiteley (2001)
- Hopetown (2004)
- Dear (2006)
- Forgive or Forget (2010)
- The Original Jenny Whiteley (2016)

== Awards and recognition ==
Juno Awards

- 1999 nominee, Best Roots/Traditional Album: Group: Heartbreak Hill
- 2001 Best Roots/Traditional Album: Jenny Whiteley
- 2005 Roots/Traditional Album of the Year: Hopetown

Canadian Folk Music Awards

- 2007 nominee, Best Contemporary Album: Dear
