= I Don't Hurt Anymore =

1954 song by Don Robertson and Jack Rollins

Single by Hank Snow (The Singing Ranger) And His Rainbow Ranch Boys
- B-side: "My Arabian Baby"
- Published: May 17, 1954 by Hill and Range Songs, Inc., New York
- Released: April 14, 1954
- Recorded: December 16, 1953
- Genre: Country
- Length: 2:31
- Label: RCA Victor 20-5698
- Composer: Don Robertson
- Lyricist: Jack Rollins

"I Don't Hurt Anymore" is a 1954 song by Hank Snow. It was written by Don Robertson and Jack Rollins.

== Prairie Oyster version ==
Canadian country music group Prairie Oyster covered the song on their album Different Kind of Fire. Their rendition went to number 70 on the Billboard Hot Country Singles chart in 1990, and also peaked at number 5 on RPM Country Tracks chart in Canada.

"I Don't Hurt Anymore"

Single by Prairie Oyster

from the album Different Kind of Fire
- B-side: "But You Said"
- Released: May 1990
- Genre: Country
- Label: RCA
- Songwriters: Don Robertson; Jack Rollins
- Producer: Steve Berlin

Prairie Oyster singles chronology
"Goodbye, So Long, Hello" (1990)	"I Don't Hurt Anymore" (1990)	"Lonely You, Lonely Me" (1990)

=== Chart performance ===
Chart (1990)	Peak position
Canada Country Singles (RPM)	5
US Hot Country Songs (Billboard)	70

=== Year-end charts ===
Chart (1990)	Position
Canada Country Tracks (RPM)	44

== Cover versions ==
- Later in 1954, Dinah Washington reached number three on the R&B Best Seller charts with her version of the song.
- Jerry Lee Lewis recorded it circa 1955 as a demo before he signed with Sun Records.
- Eddie Fisher charted with this song in 1957. Fisher scored strongly with a number of country tunes, including "Just a Little Lovin' (Will Go a Long Way)" and "Any Time".
- Janis Martin recorded it on a 1957 EP.
- Faron Young recorded it for his 1959 album Talk About Hits!.
- Bill Haley & His Comets included the song on their album Haley's Juke Box (1960).
- Hank Snow covered himself by re-recording the song in stereo in the late 1950s or early 1960s.
- Hank Thompson recorded it on his Golden Country Hits album in 1964. His version of the song is featured on the fictional radio station Rebel Radio in Grand Theft Auto V.
- Connie Francis recorded the song for her 1962 album Country Music Connie Style.
- Bob Dylan and The Band recorded the song in the 1967 sessions that would be known as The Basement Tapes, and it was officially released in 2014.
- Narvel Felts took a rendition to number 37 on the country charts in 1977.
- Martina McBride recorded this song on her 2005 classic country covers album, Timeless.
- Mandisa covered the Dinah Washington version of the song on the fifth season of American Idol (2006).
- Johnny Cash covered this song on his final album, 2010's American VI: Ain't No Grave.
- Brighton, England-based indie pop duo, Love Tan, covered the song on their 2020 self-titled cassette.
- Nancy and Beth (Megan Mullally and Stephanie Hunt band) recorded the song as single in 2019.
