= Prairie Oyster =

Country music group from Toronto, Ontario

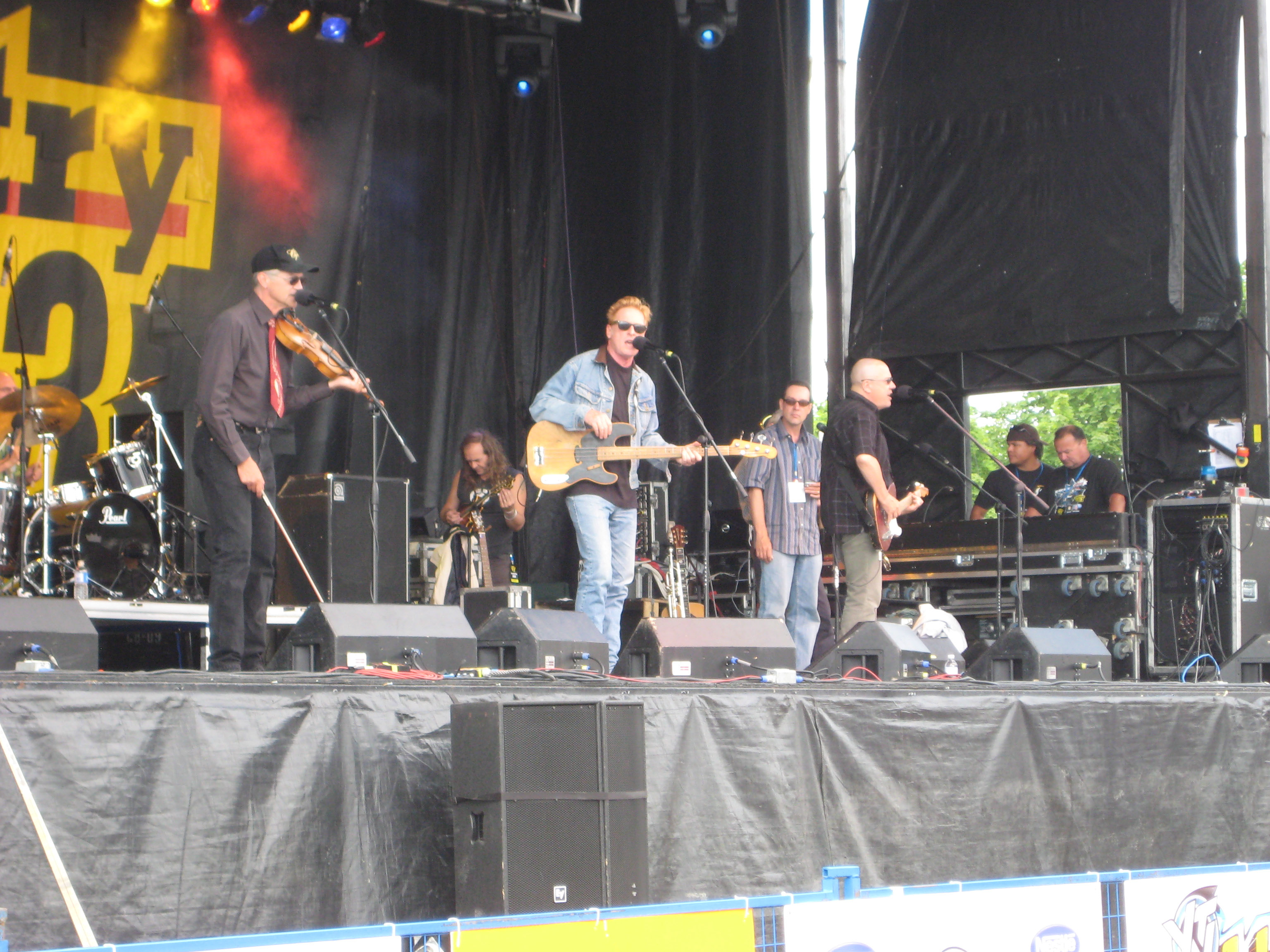
- Prairie Oyster performing in 2007

Background information
- Origin: Toronto, Ontario, Canada
- Genres: Country
- Years active: 1974–1978; 1982–2014
- Labels: Stony Plain; RCA Records; Zoo Entertainment; Arista Records; ViK. Recordings; Open Road Recordings
- Members: Russell deCarle; Keith Glass; Joan Besen; Dennis Delorme; John P. Allen
- Past members: Bruce Moffat; Bohdan Hluszko; Charlie Cooley; John Adames
- Website: prairieoyster.com

Prairie Oyster was a Canadian country music group from Toronto, Ontario. They were named Country Group or Duo of the year six times by both the Canadian Country Music Association (CCMA) and the Juno Awards. The band also won the Bud Country Fans' Choice Award from the CCMA in 1994. They have four No. 1 country singles in Canada, with an additional 12 singles reaching the Canadian Country Top 10. Eight of their albums have been certified gold or platinum by the Canadian Recording Industry Association, including the 1992 CCMA Album of the Year Everybody Knows.

While no formal announcement seems to have been made, the band is no longer touring nor are they maintaining their web site. Front-man Russell deCarle has been touring solo to promote a new album. Guitarist Keith Glass released his own solo album in 2013 and has been touring on his own as well as backing up other artists, such as Lynn Miles.

== Biography ==
Prairie Oyster formed in 1974 in Toronto. As a trio, consisting of singer/bassist Russell deCarle (born 31 May 1954), guitarist Keith Glass (born 1952) and steel guitarist Dennis Delorme, they toured and performed on television, but did not record.

The band's name is taken from a slang term for bison, cattle, or sheep testicles. (See also the Wikipedia article on Rocky Mountain Oysters.)

Their early music appeared in the 1978 short documentary film Heavy Horse Pull.

They subsequently broke up in 1978.

In 1982, the band reunited, adding fiddler John P. Allen, keyboardist Joan Besen and drummer John Adames to the lineup. Bruce Moffat soon replaced Adames, and the group released its debut album, Oyster Tracks, in 1986 on Stony Plain Records. The album found its way to RCA Records executive Joe Galante, who signed the group after seeing them perform. RCA wanted the band to change their name, but they were already too well known. Prairie Oyster was named Country Group or Duo of the Year at the Juno Awards in 1986 and 1987.

Their first album for RCA, Different Kind of Fire, was released in 1990 in both Canada and the United States. On the success of the album, Prairie Oyster was named the CCMA Group or Duo of the Year in 1990 and 1991. They also won the Juno Award for Country Group or Duo of the Year in 1991. All four singles released reached the top 15 in Canada, including the top 5s "Goodbye, So Long, Hello", "I Don't Hurt Anymore", and "Something to Remember You By." The band did not do as well in the United States, however; with their highest-charting single peaking at No. 62. "Goodbye, So Long, Hello" was the CCMA Single of the Year in 1990. The following year, "Lonely You, Lonely Me" was named Song of the Year by the CCMA. In March 1991, the band received a nomination from the Academy of Country Music for Top New Group or Duo.

Prairie Oyster's third album, Everybody Knows, was released in 1991. The album featured four top 10 singles in Canada: "Did You Fall In Love with Me", "One Precious Love", "Will I Do (Till the Real Thing Comes Along)", and "Everybody Knows." Unfortunately, only one single charted in the U.S., "One Precious Love" (#51). Prairie Oyster won several CCMA Awards in 1992, including Album of the Year for Everybody Knows, Song of the Year for "Did You Fall In Love with Me," as well as their third straight win as Group or Duo of the Year. The Juno Awards also awarded them Country Group or Duo of the Year for the fourth time.

The band's fourth album, Only One Moon, was released in Canada on Arista Records in 1994. It would also go on to become their most successful. The first single, "Such a Lonely One," was also their first No. 1 in Canada. Two more singles released from the project also reached the top of the Canadian Country chart, "Don't Cry Little Angel" and the title track. Additional singles "Louisiette", "Black-Eyed Susan", and "Ancient History" all reached the top 10. They were named Group or Duo of the Year by the CCMA in 1994, 1995 and 1996, and won the Bud Country Fans' Choice Award in 1994. The Juno Awards also recognized Prairie Oyster as the Country Group or Duo of the Year in both 1995 and 1996.

Their fifth album, Blue Plate Special, was released in 1996. The first song released from the disc, "Unbelievable Love," reached No. 1. "One Way Track" was also a top 5, but follow-up singles peaked outside the top 10. Bohdan Hluszko replaced Bruce Moffat as the drummer on the album. The following year, Hluszko was fired from the band after coming out as transgender.

With the 1998 release of their sixth album, What Is This Country?, the group returned to the top 10 with the songs "Canadian Sunrise" (#5) and "Keep On Dreaming (#9). Charlie Cooley filled in as drummer for the band. Cooley is the father of Canadian actor Ryan Cooley.

The band released their first greatest hits album, String of Pearls: A Greatest Hits Collection, in 2000. The only song released from the project was "Man in the Moon," which had been re-recorded as a duet with folk singer-songwriter Jenny Whiteley.

Prairie Oyster re-surfaced in 2006 with the release of their latest album, One Kiss, on Open Road Recordings. So far the album has produced three singles, "Sweet Sweet Girl to Me" (written and originally recorded by Don Gibson), "Too Bad For Me," and a cover of Bob Dylan's "I Threw It All Away." The group continues to tour and perform at music festivals and clubs in Canada and the United States.

Prairie Oyster was inducted into the Canadian Country Music Hall of Fame in 2008.

In 2011, the band was presented with a SOCAN National Achievement Award.

The band is a member of the Canadian charity Artists Against Racism.

== Solo projects ==
Russell deCarle currently tours and records with his solo group The Russell deCarle Trio, which play an eclectic mix of blues, jazz, country and western, Latin music, R&B and western swing. The current configuration of deCarle's band features him playing rhythm guitar instead of bass. In 2012, deCarle released his first studio album, Under the Big Big Sky. The studio album was released by Universal Music. In 2015, one of deCarle's concerts was professionally recorded and later released as Live At Loud Mouse Studios. Music critics have compared deCarle's solo recordings to other eclectic Country music and roots rock acts such as Chris Isaak, Willie Nelson, The Mavericks, Lyle Lovett, Raul Malo, and Los Lobos.

Keith Glass currently performs with Canadian folk artist Lynn Miles and also with his group Keith Glass Band. In addition to working as a songwriter and producer, Glass is a music historian who wrote the liner notes for The Box Tops CD box set release entitled The Original Albums 1967–69, which was released in January 2015 by Raven Records.

== Discography ==
Albums

- 1986 Oyster Tracks
- 1990 Different Kind of Fire
- 1991 Everybody Knows
- 1994 Only One Moon
- 1996 Blue Plate Special
- 1998 What Is This Country?
- 2000 String of Pearls: A Greatest Hits Collection
- 2006 One Kiss

== Solo discography ==
- 2013 Bad Dog Keith Glass
- 2012 Under The Big Big Sky Russell deCarle
- 2015 Live at Loud Mouse Studios Russell deCarle
- 2017 Alone in This Crowd Russell deCarle

== Awards and nominations ==
=== Awards ===
Canadian Country Music Awards

- 1990 Group or Duo of the Year
- 1990 Single of the Year, "Goodbye, So Long, Hello"
- 1991 Group or Duo of the Year
- 1991 SOCAN Song of the Year, "Lonely You, Lonely Me"
- 1992 Group or Duo of the Year
- 1992 SOCAN Song of the Year, "Did You Fall In Love with Me"
- 1992 Album of the Year, Everybody Knows
- 1994 Bud Country Fans' Choice Award
- 1994 Group or Duo of the Year
- 1995 Group or Duo of the Year
- 1996 Group or Duo of the Year

Juno Awards

- 1986 Best Country Group or Duo
- 1987 Best Country Group or Duo
- 1991 Best Country Group or Duo
- 1992 Best Country Group or Duo
- 1995 Best Country Group or Duo
- 1996 Best Country Group or Duo

SOCAN Awards

- 2011 National Achievement Award

=== Nominations ===
Academy of Country Music

- 1990 Top New Vocal Duo or Group
