= Robert Watson =

Robert Watson, Bob Watson, or Bobby Watson may refer to:

== Politics ==
- Robert Spence Watson (1837–1911), English solicitor, reformer, politician and writer
- Robert James Watson (1846–1931), Canadian parliamentarian
- Robert Watson (Canadian politician) (1853–1929), Canadian parliamentarian
- Robert Watson (Newfoundland politician) (1863–1906)
- Bob Watson (Australian politician) (1896–1959), member of the Queensland Legislative Assembly
- Robert Watson Pomeroy (1902–1989), American businessman and politician
- Robert A. Watson (born 1960), Rhode Island politician
- Robert P. Watson (born 1962), American political commentator, former candidate in Florida

== Science ==
- Robert Watson (engineer) (1822–1891), English and Australian civil engineer, surveyor, railway engineer
- Robert Boog Watson (1823–1910), Scottish malacologist
- Sir Robert Watson (chemist) (born 1948), British chemist and atmosphere scientist
- Robert Watson (computer scientist) (born 1977), British FreeBSD developer

== Sports ==
- Robert Watson (footballer) (1866 – after 1889), English footballer for Everton
- Robert B. Watson (1913–1997), Canadian Hall of Fame jockey
- Robert B. Watson (administrator) (1914–2000), American college athletic director and dean
- Bobby Watson (basketball player) (1930–2017), American basketball player
- Bobby Watson (basketball coach) (1942–1977), American basketball coach
- Bob Watson (1946–2020), American sports executive and pro baseball player
- Bobby Watson (footballer) (born 1946), Scottish football player and manager
- Bob Watson (lacrosse) (born 1970), Canadian lacrosse goaltender
- Bob Watson (footballer, born 1881) (1881–1947), English footballer

== Other people ==
- Robert Watson (historian) (1730–1781), Scottish professor and historian
- Robert Watson (harbourmaster) (1756–1819), British sailor, settler in Sydney, New South Wales, Australia
- Bobby Watson (actor) (1888–1965), American actor
- Robert Watson (artist) (1923–2004), American landscape painter
- Robert W. Watson (1925–2012), English and creative writing professor at UNC Greensboro
- Bobby Watson (American musician) (born 1953), American jazz saxophonist
- Bobby Watson (Canadian musician) (born 1946), Canadian blues singer and guitarist
- Robert K. Watson (born 1961), American businessman, pioneer of green building
- Robert Watson (Scrabble player), American National Scrabble Championship winner, 1988

== See also ==
- Rob Watson (disambiguation)
- Robert Watson-Watt (1892–1973), Scottish radar pioneer
