= MSOP =

MSOP may refer to:

- Mandolin Society of Peterborough, non-profit community mandolin orchestra base in Peterborough, Ontario, Canada
- Memphis School of Preaching, American two-year collegiate institution
- Mini Small Outline Package, surface mount package for electronics
