= Rigoletto (disambiguation) =

Rigoletto is an 1851 opera in three acts by Giuseppe Verdi.

Rigoletto may also refer to:

- Rigoletto (1918 film), an Austrian silent historical film
- Rigoletto (1956 film), an Italian musical melodrama film
- Rigoletto (1982 film), an Italian opera film
- Rigoletto (1993 film), a musical fantasy/drama

== See also ==
- Giuseppe Verdi's Rigoletto Story, a 2002 film version of the opera
- Rigoletto... in Bluegrass, a 2006 Canadian film
