= Rob Watson =

Rob Watson may refer to:

- Rob Watson (athlete) (born 1983), Canadian long-distance runner
- Rob Watson (musician), keyboard player, producer and composer
- Robert K. Watson (born 1961), American environmentalist

== See also ==
- Robert Watson (disambiguation)
