= Washboard Hank =

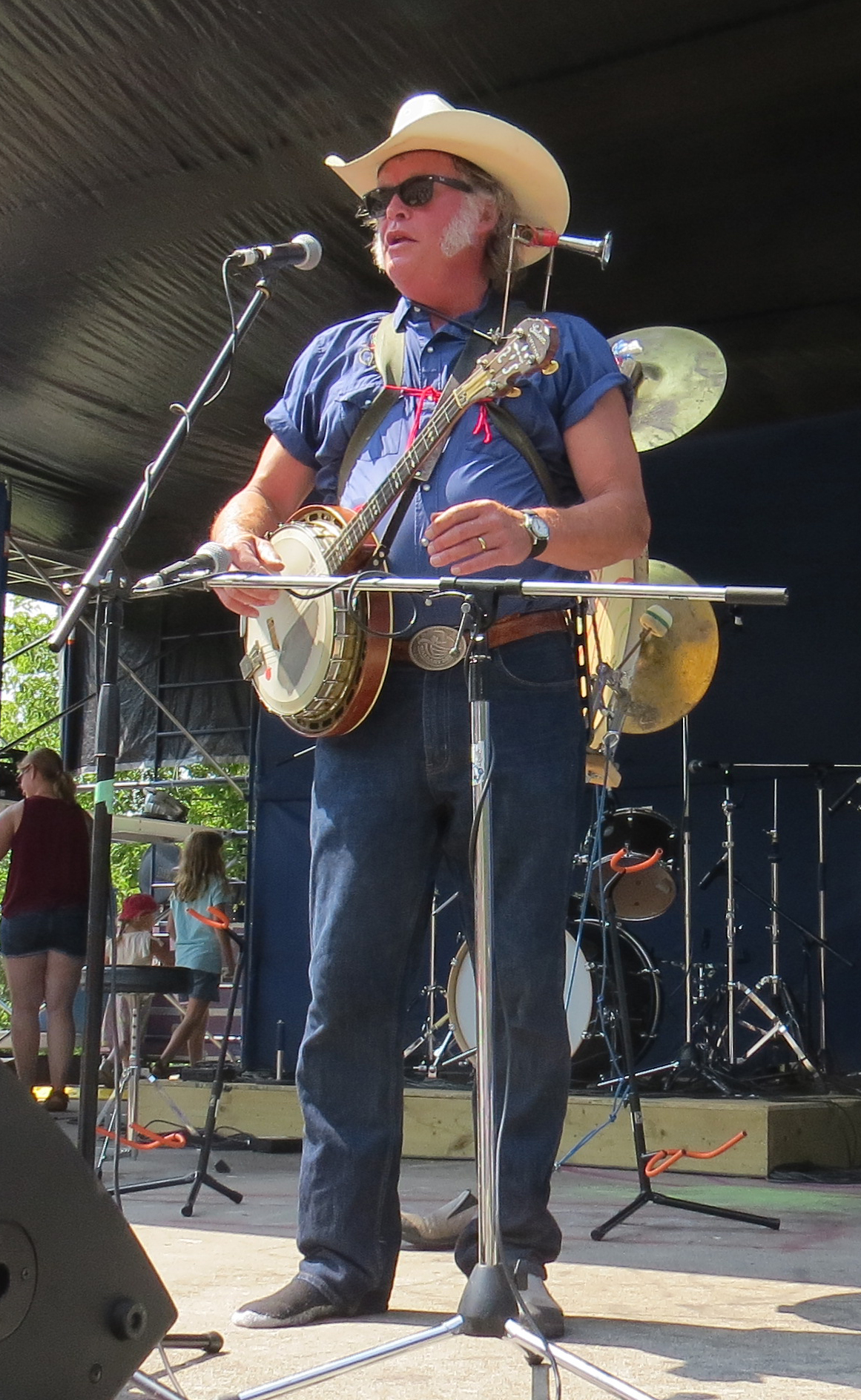
- Washboard Hank on stage at the Peterborough Folk Festival, August 2017

Background information
- Born: Hank Fisher; 1954 (age 71–72); Peterborough, Ontario, Canada
- Genres: Folk, Country
- Instruments: Washboard, Guitar, Vocals

Hank Fisher (born 1954), more commonly known as Washboard Hank, is a Canadian musician, songwriter and stage performer. He was born in Peterborough, Ontario in 1954. He plays a number of instruments, including banjo, guitar and percussion. He is known for his unusual performances with self-created instruments. In 2016 he performed with his band, the Wringers.

Fisher is a regular performer at children's events, including the Peterborough Folk Festival. He creates and plays improvised instruments, including his "signature" washboard. and kitchen sink tuba. He sings humorous traditional tunes such as "It Ain't Gonna Rain No More" as well as his own compositions.

== Career ==
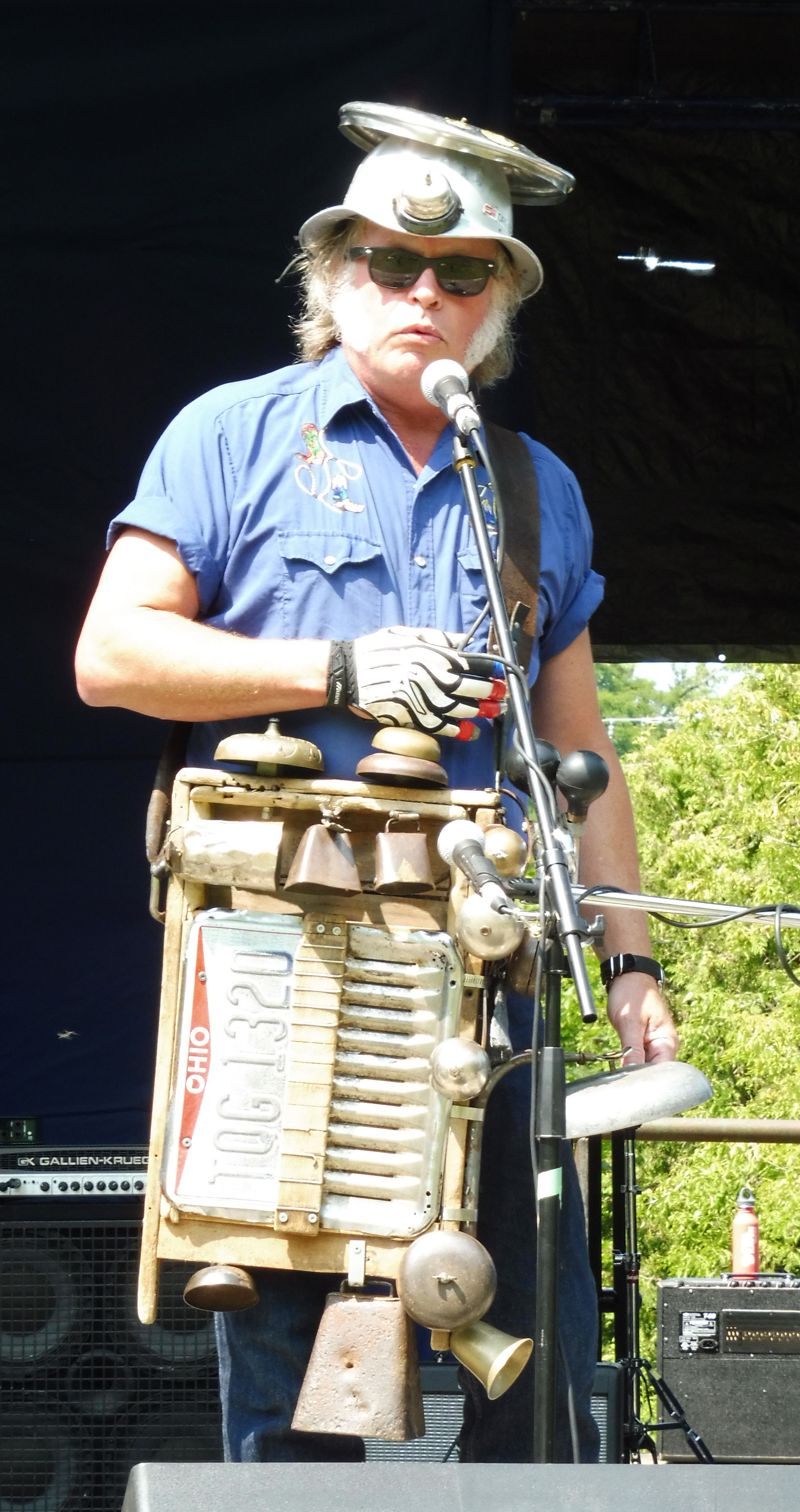
Washboard Hank with his one-man band equipment, including his signature washboard.

In the 1980s, Fisher performed with Reverend Ken (Ramsden) and the Lost Followers; after Ramsden left, the group became Washboard Hank and the Honkers. In 1989 Fisher began co-hosting a show, "The Country Cousins" on Peterborough's Trent Radio. The show was aired for more than 20 years.

In the 1990s, he performed for four years as a percussionist with Fred Eaglesmith and the Flying Squirrels, recording on his album 50-Odd Dollars.

In 2001, Fisher provided the music for an agitprop play, Where's the Care?, created by the group Ground Zero to protest cutbacks in healthcare services in Ontario. He also performed a lead role in the independent short film, Rigoletto... in Bluegrass in 2006.

He has toured with the Country Squires, and he also fronted his own band, the Gravestone Lickers.

Fisher performed on an Adventure Canada cruise ship to Greenland. He also played locally with Catfish Willie and the Buckle Busters.

In 2012, Fisher performed at the Alianait Arts Festival in Iqaluit, Nunavut.

== Discography ==
- Donkeys and Tire Fires (1990)
- Hooray for Washboard Hank (A Major Label, 2003) As Washboard Hank And The Country Squires
- Big Fun For Kids (2007)
- Sweet Mysteries Of Life (2008)
- Human Beans (2016)
