= EVV =

EVV might refer to:

- EVV Echt, Dutch football club
- Evansville Regional Airport, American airport
- EVV Eindhoven, the former name of the Dutch football club FC Eindhoven
- Electronic visit verification (EVV), a way to confirm and track home health care services electronically
