= Mandolin Society of Peterborough =

Non-profit community mandolin orchestra base in Peterborough, Ontario, Canada

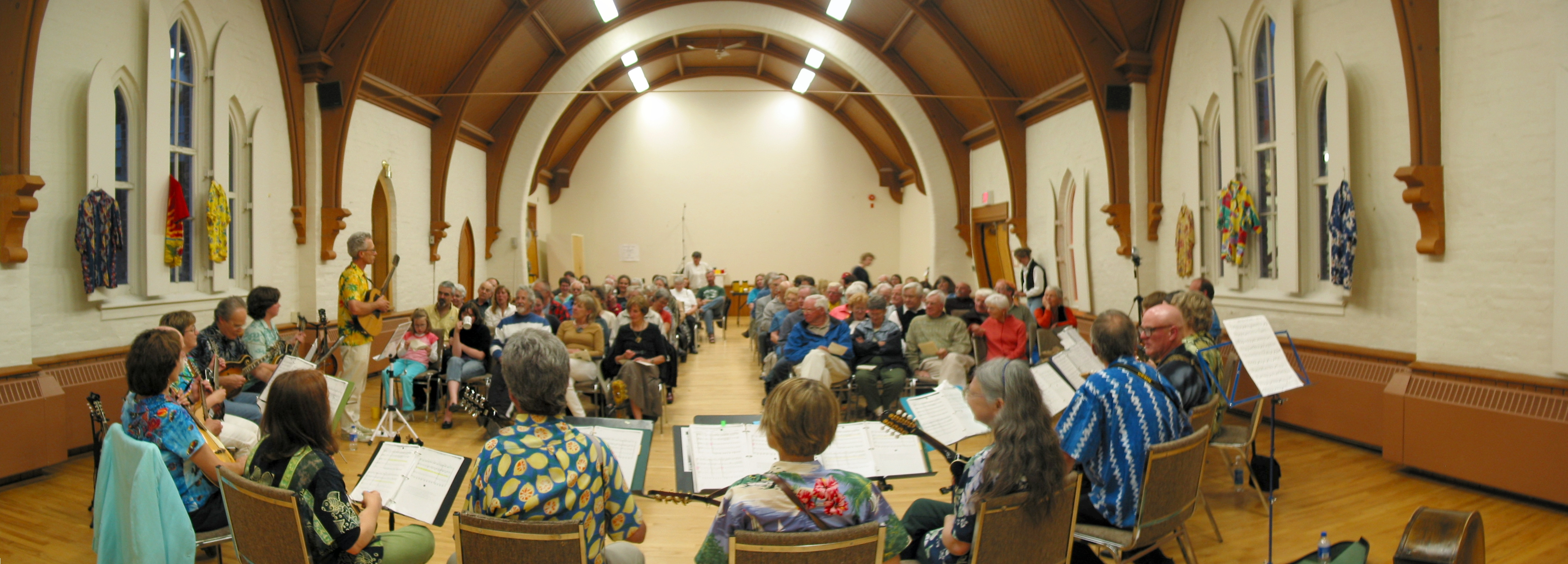
The Mandolin Society of Peterborough's first concert, 9 June 2006, St John's Guild Hall, conductor Curtis Driedger standing at left

The Mandolin Society of Peterborough (MSOP) was a non-profit community mandolin orchestra based in the City of Peterborough, Ontario, Canada. The MSOP was one of three such groups in Ontario (as of 2013), and the only one composed completely of mandolinists. In 2019, the society disbanded.

== History ==
The Society was founded in 2003 by Curtis Driedger. Since the year 2000, several Peterborough musical groups have come together in December each year put on a concert called In From the Cold. This well-attended community event raises thousands of dollars each year for the Peterborough Youth Emergency Shelter. The organizers wanted to add something new to the 2003 concert, and since many of them were mandolinists, they performed three Christmas carols on mandolins, with Driedger as arranger and Conductor.

In 2004 the group moved beyond its original purpose, adding to its membership other mandolinists from Peterborough and the surrounding area. At first practices were held in members' homes, but soon a larger space was needed and the group began meeting in the premises of the Art School of Peterborough. After spending a number of months building up a repertoire, the still somewhat small orchestra made its first solo appearance, providing the music at a fund raiser for the Art School in the Great Hall at Trent University.

Once again in December, and for the next seven years, the orchestra took part in the In From the Cold concert. continuing to raise money for the Youth Emergency Shelter. Each year a recording of this concert is broadcast Christmas Day on Trent Radio - 92.7 CFFF FM.

In 2005, the Mandolin Society appeared in "Rigoletto... in Bluegrass", Rob Swales' award-winning film adaptation of the opera Rigoletto by Giuseppe Verdi, performing the Prelude and Introduction from the opera at the Peterborough Folk Festival.

In 2006 the orchestra's first full length concert was held. Musical arrangements for the concert were created by Driedger and other members of the group. By this time the group had seventeen members and included several octave mandolins. This was the first of many annual concerts. The program each year includes solo pieces and guest musicians.

Also in 2006 the Mandolin Society performed as part of the Peterborough New Dance Festival, and the Artsweek Street Festival. Later that year, the orchestra performed at the Peterborough Festival of Trees; this festival raised over $200,000 for local health care facilities.

By 2007 the orchestra had grown to 20 members, having once more outgrown its practice space and moved to the Peterborough ArtSpace building. To help support this organization, the group took part in the annual Twelve Days of Artspace fundraiser. Society members formed a special four-piece band, the MandoBeatles, who made their first appearance at the MSOP Spring Concert. Also that year, the Mandolin Society took part in the "Goddess for a Day" event at Peterborough Square to raise money for the United Way.

In 2008 two members of the society who played together as the Messey Fargusons (a word play on the name of a local farm implement company), took up mandolins and each year thereafter performed as a duet in the spring concert. That year, as well as its usual concert and participation in the In From the Cold fundraiser, the Mandolin Society took part in Folkways Sundays at Lang Pioneer Village, playing music from the 19th century for passing tourists and history buffs. The orchestra also provided inspirational music at a meeting of the Peterborough Unitarian Fellowship, participated in a concert in support of the Ontario Music Centre summer camp, and later performed as part of "Alley Waltz 2008: Counting the Ways", a production of Peterborough's Disappearing Theatre. Practices in 2008 were moved to Sadleir House.

In 2009 the Mandolin Society included two mandocello players in its lineup at the spring concert, and participated in a concert in support of the Canadian Amateur Musicians Association Summer Music Camp. The orchestra also provided period music at the Ontario Heritage Society annual conference, and once again entertained the congregation of the Unitarian Fellowship.

For the first time, in 2010, the orchestra included a custom built mandobass, a rarely seen instrument. Beginning in 2010, the City of Peterborough has presented the Mandolin Society each year with a community grant in recognition of its cultural contributions to the local community. That year the annual concert included as guests the conch shell ensemble Davey Jones' Locker.

By 2013 the Society was meeting weekly at Sadleir House. Instruments played included standard mandolins, octave mandolins, mandocelli and one mandobass. The Messey Fargusons, the MandoBeatles and a variety of guests musicians continued to perform as part of the annual concert. The Mandolin Society continued to participate in community events and charity fundraisers in Peterborough.
