= Air Indiana Flight 216 =

1977 aviation accident in the U.S.

Coordinates: 38°2′11.89″N 87°31′7.61″W

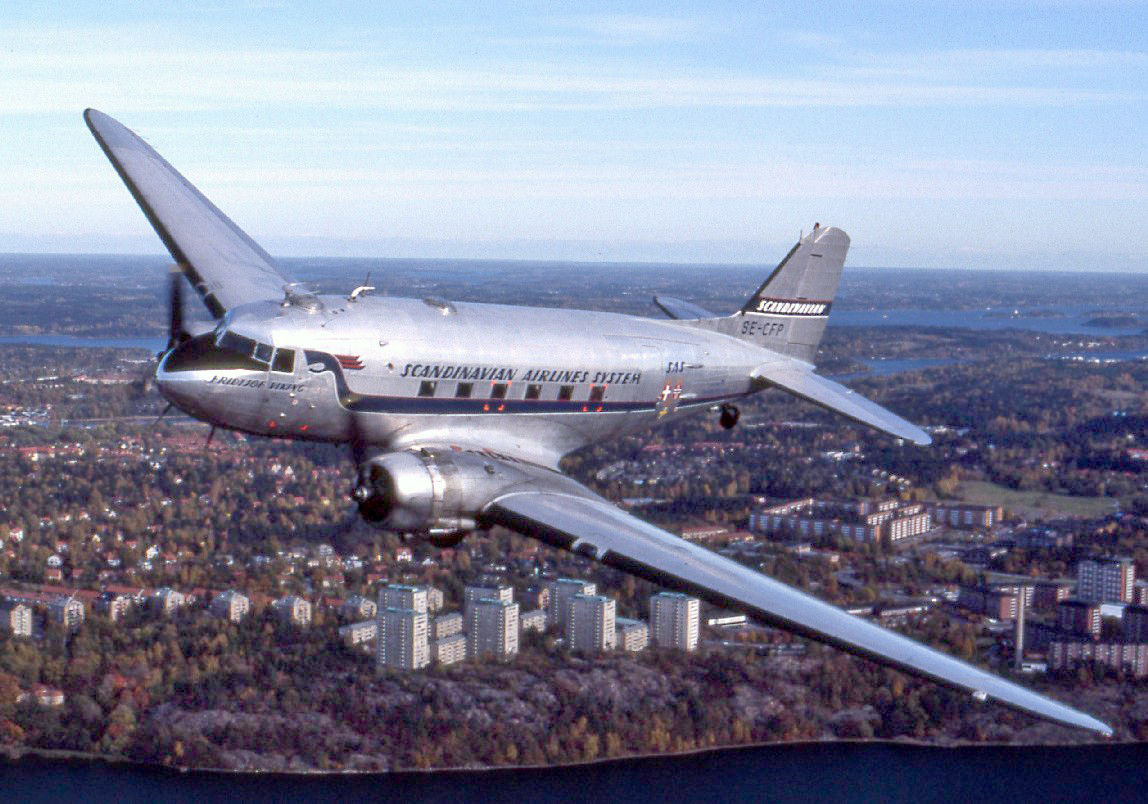
- DC-3 similar to accident aircraft

Accident
- Date: December 13, 1977
- Summary: Rudder and right aileron control locks not removed before takeoff
- Site: Evansville Regional Airport, Indiana, United States

Aircraft
- Aircraft type: Douglas DC-3
- Operator: Air Indiana
- Registration: N51071
- Flight origin: Evansville Regional Airport, Indiana
- Destination: Nashville International Airport, Nashville, Tennessee
- Passengers: 26
- Crew: 3
- Fatalities: 29
- Survivors: 0

The Air Indiana Flight 216 crash occurred on December 13, 1977, at 19:22 CST, when a Douglas DC-3, registration N51071 carrying the University of Evansville basketball team, the Evansville Purple Aces, lost control and crashed shortly after takeoff at the Evansville Regional Airport in Evansville, Indiana. The plane was on its way to Nashville International Airport, taking the team to play the Middle Tennessee Blue Raiders in Murfreesboro, Tennessee.

The National Transportation Safety Board blamed the crash on the pilot's failure to remove gust locks on the right aileron and the rudder before takeoff, as well as an overloaded baggage compartment. The NTSB report said that the plane might have been able to stay airborne had only one of the problems existed. As it was, the extra baggage shifted the plane's center of gravity to the rear, and the locked rudder and aileron made it impossible to control the overweight aircraft.

Head coach Bobby Watson was the only coach on board the flight as his assistant coaches were on scouting assignments at the time. Athletic director Jim Byers had planned to board the plane but stayed behind to interview a candidate for the baseball program. Four of the passengers were still breathing when found by rescuers, with three dying on the scene and one dying hours after the accident. The only member of the Purple Aces who did not die in the crash was 18-year-old freshman David Furr; he was out for the season with an ankle injury and thus was not on the plane that day. Two weeks after the crash, Furr and his younger brother Byron were killed in a car accident near Newton, Illinois, leaving the entire 1977 Evansville team dead. After consideration, the rest of the season was cancelled.

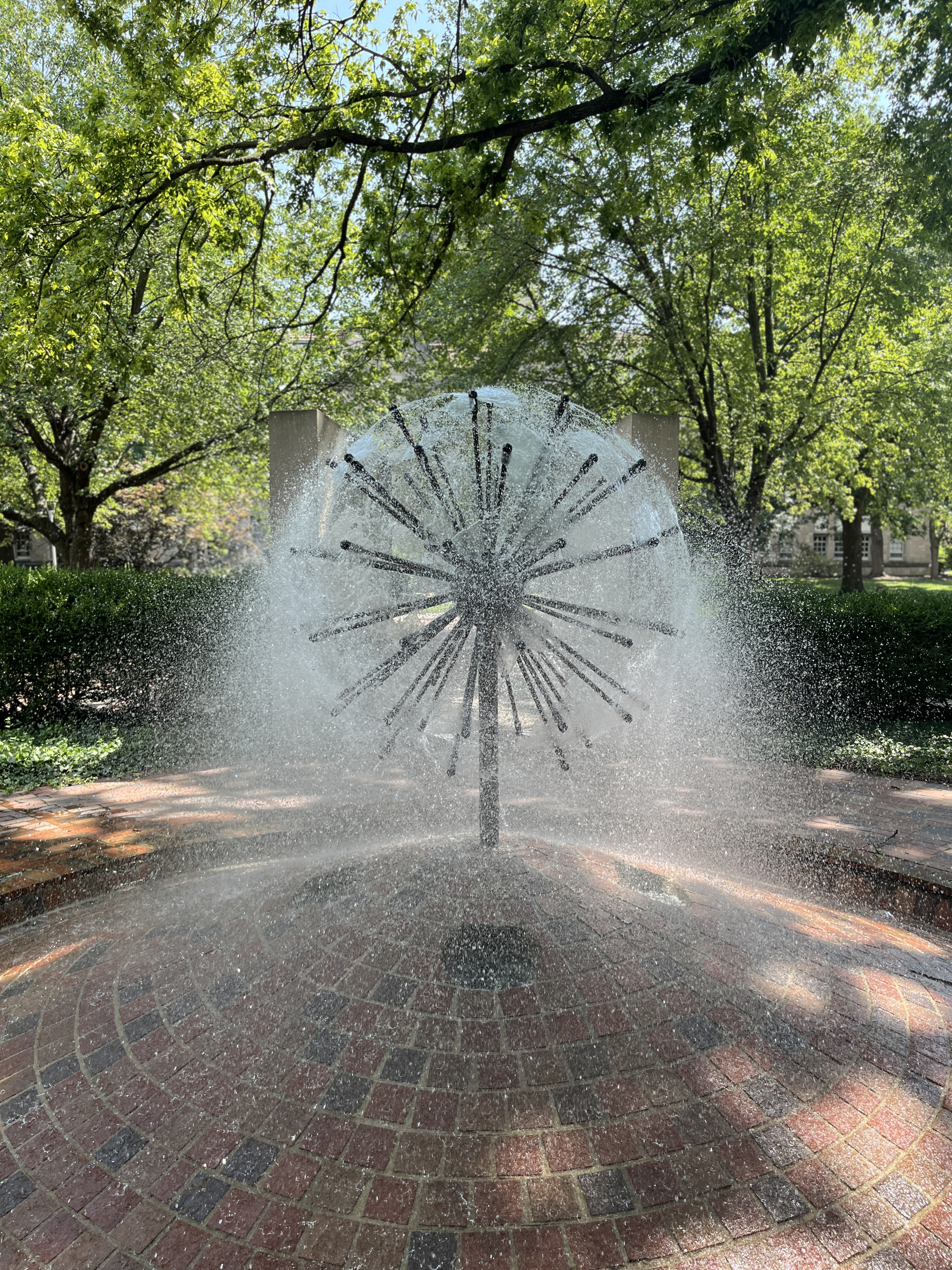
The "Weeping Basketball" fountain memorial at the University of Evansville, commemorating the Air Indiana Flight 216 crash.

A memorial has been constructed at the University of Evansville known as the "Weeping Basketball." On stone slabs are engraved the names of the players who were killed, including Furr (the final name on the monument is that of Charles Goad of the Goad Equipment Company, invited on the flight by his friend Bob Hudson). Also engraved is an excerpt from the eulogy delivered by school president Wallace Graves at a memorial service: "Out of the agony of this hour we will rise." A memorial is also at the Ford Center, where the Purple Aces currently play their home games.

== Flight crew ==
- Airplane crew:
  - Pilot - Ty Van Pham (aged 42)
  - Copilot - Gaston Ruiz (aged 35)

== See also ==
- List of accidents involving sports teams
- Air Midwest Flight 5481, an accident where maintenance errors combined with aircraft overloading to cause a stall and crash.
- Fine Air Flight 101, a DC-8 that was improperly loaded with the center of gravity shifted towards the back. Because loaders did not give the crew the proper information with regards to how the aircraft was loaded, the pilots improperly set their trim for takeoff. The plane immediately stalled and crashed after departure.
