= Bobby Watson (Canadian musician) =

Canadian singer and guitarist (born 1946)

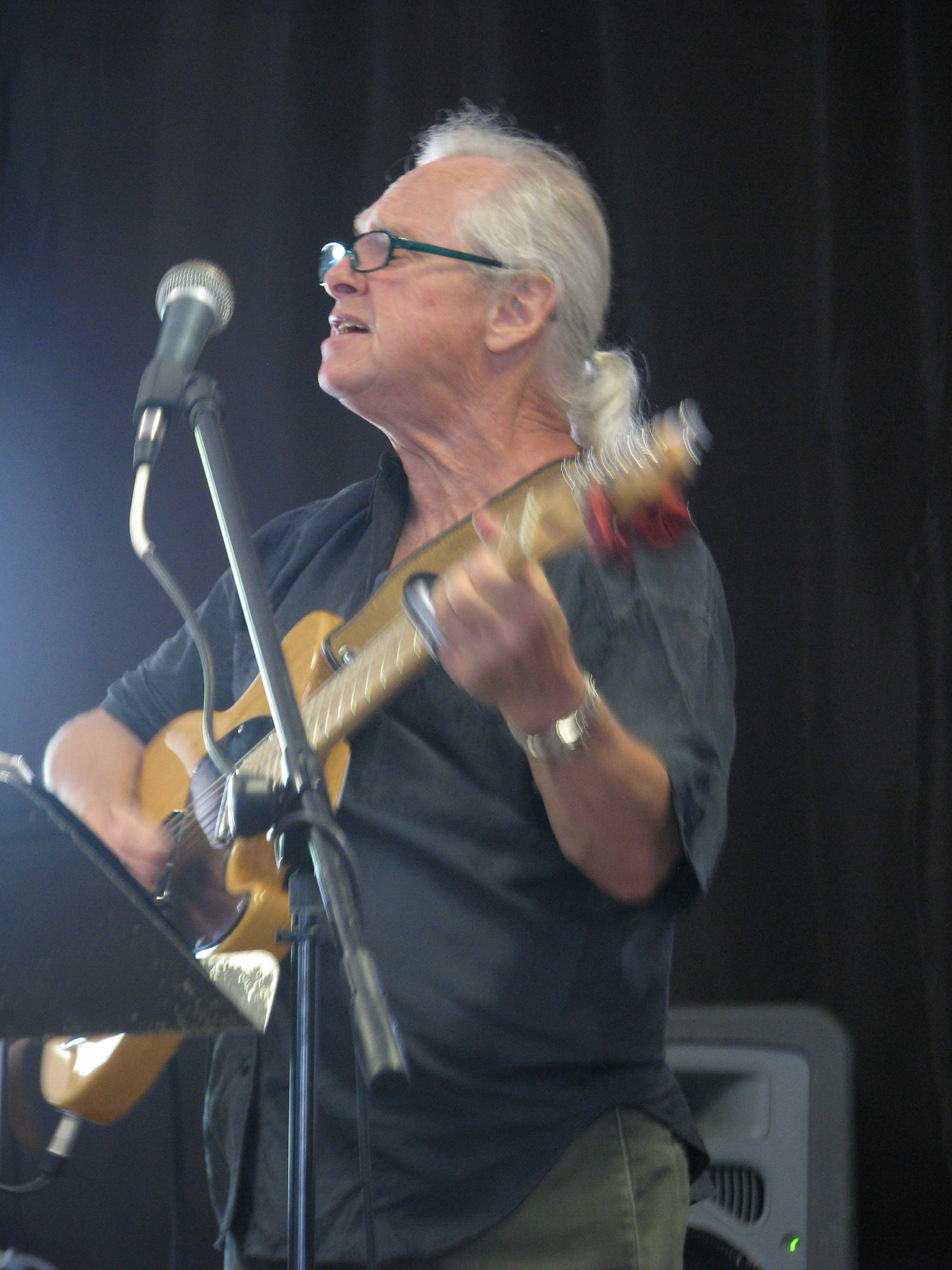
- Watson with his Telecaster in 2012

Background information
- Born: 1946 (age 78–79); Peterborough, Ontario, Canada
- Instrument: Guitar

Bobby Watson (born 1946) is a Canadian blues singer and guitarist based in Peterborough, Ontario. He plays both acoustic and electric rock and Memphis-style blues.

== Early life ==
Robert Morris "Rob" Watson was born and raised in Peterborough, Ontario, and studied guitar as a child. He attended Peterborough Collegiate. While he was in high school, he and three of his friends formed a band called "The Hangmen" and played at local venues. The band performed with hoods over their heads.

== Career ==
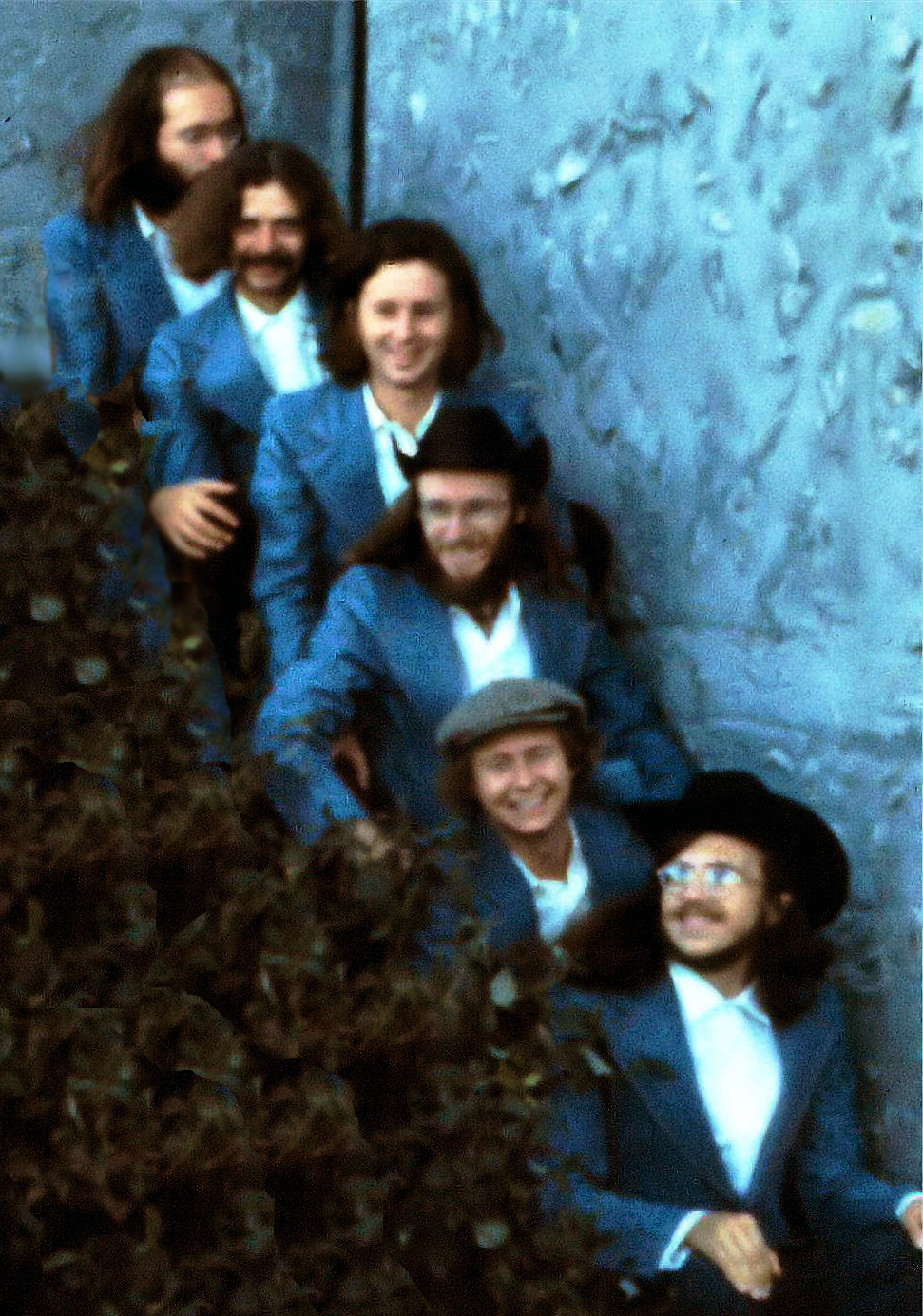
Watson (second from bottom) with Bacon Fat in 1973 at Trent University

After high school, Watson and fellow Hangman Buzz Thompson organized a band called Cold Porridge with drummer Paul Healey and keyboardist Mike Townes. They played in dance halls and high school auditoriums in Peterborough and nearby towns for the next two years. Watson worked in a factory job for a short while, and then sang and played lead guitar in a number of short-lived bands in the Peterborough area, including The Outcrowd, Sumac, Bacon Fat, Uncle Bobby’s Aerial ballet. He then joined the band Coyote, replacing guitarist Gary Comeau. Although Coyote was signed to Capitol Records at the time, the band did not release any recordings after Watson joined. He also performed in the Ottawa group Ensemble with Colleen Peterson.

Watson played guitar for a short while with Ronnie Hawkins in 1989. He lived in Memphis, Tennessee, for many years, playing stage shows and as a studio musician, and performing in the house band at the Rum Boogie Tavern. He also played with a band at casino shows in Mississippi.

After returning to Canada, Watson performed with the Peterborough band Jackson Delta, who joined him for the album Go For the Heart - Rob Watson and Jackson Delta Electric Live, recorded at Market Hall in 1996. The album contains some of his original songs, including "Go for the Heart" and "Doin' Time".

Watson played lead guitar with Max Mouse and the Gorillas and recorded with them on their album 1998 Alive. From time to time he played guest spots with Al Black and the Steady Band and took part in many local festivals and community events.

In 2008 Watson played on keyboardist Terry Blankley's album Money Talks. and contributed some guitar work to his 2009 and 2012 albums Invitation to the Blues and Cold Weather Blues. From 2009 to 2014 he performed as part of the annual Rocket Review at Market Hall in Peterborough. He formed a band, Bobby Watson and the Crown Royals, which performed mainly at local events and venues in the Peterborough area.

In 2016, Watson travelled to Los Angeles to record five tracks at Rocket Carousel Studios, with record producer Greg Wells and executive producer John Crown. Along with some additional tracks recorded live with local musicians by James McKenty at the Historic Red Dog Tavern in Peterborough, these were released as the album From the East Side – Bobby Watson. Also in 2016, Watson played the lead character in a short film, In the Cover, directed by Michael Morritt. Watson contributed a track to the 2017 compilation album Sounds of the Pathway.

As of 2019, he continues to perform with various blues and rock groups at events and venues around southern Ontario, and leads his band, Bobby Watson and the Crown Royals, in a regular Tuesday pub night in Peterborough. He also continues to perform as the lead guitarist for Max Mouse and the Gorillas, and as a duo, High and Lonesome, with singer Kate Kelly.

== Discography ==
- Go For The Heart -Rob Watson with Jackson Delta Live -1996
- Alive - Max Mouse and the Gorillas, 1998
- From the East Side – Bobby Watson 2016
