= Rigoletto... in Bluegrass =

2006 Canadian film

Rigoletto... in Bluegrass is a 2006 Canadian independent film directed by Rob Swales, based on the 1851 opera Rigoletto by Giuseppe Verdi. Filming took place in Peterborough, Ontario, Canada, in 2005 and the film was first screened in 2006.

The plot takes the general form of Verdi's opera, but the character of the duke becomes Duke, the leader of a bluegrass band, played by eccentric multi-instrumentalist Washboard Hank. Most of the music from the original opera is adapted as bluegrass music, although the original "Prelude" and "Introduction" were performed in an orchestral arrangement by the Mandolin Society of Peterborough and recorded at the Peterborough Folk Festival.

Rigoletto... in Bluegrass was awarded Best Originality at the Bluegrass Independent Film Festival in La Grange, Kentucky.

- Director: Rob Swales
- Musical director: David E. Robertson
- Composition: David E. Robertson, Rob Swales
- Photographer: Candace Shaw
- Editor: Lester Alfonso
- Actors/musicians: Ron Mann, Melinda Wall, Washboard Hank, Mike Duguay, Mathias Kom, Ray Henderson, Johnny Chartrand, Mike Young, Benj Rowland, Esther Vincent, Caitlin Driscoll, Gene Jochen, Sarah Chartrand, Anya Gwynne, Ian Osborne
