= Bobby Watson (basketball coach) =

American basketball coach

- Watson in 1977

Personal information
- Born: August 8, 1942 Bethel Park, Pennsylvania, U.S.
- Died: December 13, 1977 (aged 35) Evansville, Indiana, U.S.
- Listed height: 6 ft 7 in (2.01 m)

Career information
- High school: Bethel Park (Bethel Park, Pennsylvania)
- College: VMI (1961–1964)
- NBA draft: 1964: undrafted
- Position: Center
- Coaching career: 1964–1977

Career history

Coaching
- 1964–1965: Fleming HS
- 1967–1968; 1969–1971: Xavier (assistant)
- 1971–1973: Ferrum
- 1973–1974: Wake Forest (assistant)
- 1974–1977: Oral Roberts (assistant)
- 1977: Evansville

Career coaching record
- College: 1–3 (.250)

Robert Lee Watson (August 8, 1942 – December 13, 1977) was an American basketball coach. He was in his first season as a head coach for the Evansville Purple Aces men's basketball team when he and his team were killed in the 1977 Air Indiana Flight 216 crash.

Watson was a college basketball player for the VMI Keydets and began his coaching career at a Virginia high school. His early coaching career was interrupted by two stints in the Vietnam War but he returned as an assistant coach for the Xavier Musketeers. Watson first came to prominence as the head coach for the Ferrum Panthers from 1971 to 1973. He worked as an assistant coach for the Wake Forest Demon Deacons and the Oral Roberts Golden Eagles. Watson was hired as the head coach of the Purple Aces in 1977 for their first season as a member of NCAA Division I competition and had amassed a 1–3 record at the time of his death.

== College and military career ==
Watson grew up in Bethel Park, Pennsylvania. He was a star basketball and baseball player while he attended Bethel Park High School and was offered a basketball scholarship to attend the Virginia Military Institute. As the team's starting center, Watson played college basketball for the VMI Keydets from 1961 to 1964, where he led the team in rebounds during his sophomore and senior seasons. Watson served as a team captain during his senior season when the Keydets won the 1964 Southern Conference championship.

Instead of playing professionally, Watson embarked on a coaching career immediately after the end of his college stint and was hired by William Fleming High School in Roanoke, Virginia. Watson entered the United States Army in 1965 and served two tours in the Vietnam War as a member of the 101st Airborne Division. He was shot out of a helicopter three times and once narrowly escaped death when his disabled helicopter fell 75 feet into a rice paddy field, which cushioned the crash. Watson was awarded two Bronze Star Medals, the Commendation Medal and five Purple Hearts.

== Coaching career ==
=== Assistant roles and Ferrum College ===
After his first eighteen-month Vietnam tour, he served as an assistant coach for the Xavier Musketeers for one season. He returned to the Musketeers after his second Vietnam stint in 1969. Watson was highly regarded for his prospect recruiting abilities while serving under head coach George Krajack, who had personally recruited Watson to the program. When Krajack resigned in 1971, Watson also left the Musketeers out of loyalty to Krajack.

Watson desired a head coaching role and discovered a vacancy at Ferrum College while reading a newspaper. He served as the head coach for the Ferrum Panthers men's basketball team from 1971 to 1973 and amassed a 61–8 record. Watson's success at Ferrum brought him national attention, including a head coaching offer from the Musketeers. He instead accepted an offer to become an assistant coach for the Wake Forest Demon Deacons and served there from 1973 to 1974. In 1974, he was hired as an assistant coach for the Oral Roberts Golden Eagles.

=== Evansville ===
On March 11, 1977, Watson was announced as the head coach of the Evansville Purple Aces. The previous candidate, Jerry Sloan, had resigned after spending six days with the program. It was the Aces' first season in 31 years without head coach Arad McCutchan, who had led the team to five NCAA Division II championships. It was also the team's first season as a member of NCAA Division I and Watson entered the program with high expectations. Watson promised to stay with the Aces "as long as [they] will have me."

Watson led a recruitment period overseeing nine freshmen signing to join the team for the 1977–78 season, whom he believed to be "as fine a nucleus as we could have brought in for the coming years." He also launched public relation campaigns with local community leaders to improve ticket sales, selling 1,000 new season tickets in the few weeks after he was hired. Evansville business manager Bob Hudson stated, "I've never seen a man work so hard or more so fast." Watson came to be seen by Aces supporters as the savior of their program.

The Aces lost their first two games of the season to the Western Kentucky Hilltoppers and the DePaul Blue Demons. Their first and only win of the season came on December 6, 1977, against the Pittsburgh Panthers. After the game, Watson remarked, "I've been involved in a lot of wins, but few sweeter than that one." The Aces' final game was a loss on December 10, 1977, against the Indiana State Sycamores. After the game, Watson stated that his team needed more courage and mental toughness when playing away games.

On December 13, 1977, the Purple Aces were to fly to Nashville, Tennessee, to play the Middle Tennessee Blue Raiders the following night. The Aces teams under McCutchan would often travel to away games on the same day, but Watson preferred to fly a day early to allow his players to practice on the host's court. The team's plane had been delayed by three hours due to bad weather. Shortly after take-off at around 7:20pm from the Evansville Regional Airport, the plane suffered an engine failure and crashed, which killed all 29 people on board. Watson was the only coach on board the flight as his assistant coaches were on scouting assignments at the time. The University of Evansville cancelled the rest of the Purple Aces' season after briefly considering carrying on with a substitute team, which Evansville athletic director Jim Byers stated would be what Watson would have wanted.

== Personal life ==
Watson married Deidra on December 14, 1973. They had three daughters. Deidra and their daughters remained in Evansville for two years after Watson's death and then moved to Louisville, Kentucky. Watson's identical twin daughters, Chandra and Leigh, comprise the rock duo The Watson Twins.

== Legacy ==
Watson was inducted into the Evansville Purple Aces Hall of Fame in 1978 and the Ferrum College Alumni Sports Hall of Fame in 1997. Ferrum College offers the Bobby Watson Endowed Scholarship, which is awarded to students with an interest in athletics.
