= Reverend Ken and the Lost Followers =

Reverend Ken and the Lost Followers were a Canadian musical novelty act performing from the late 1970s to the late 1980s. Remembered for residencies at the Red Dog Tavern in Peterborough, Ontario, this is the location where they recorded their most famous song (and only single) "The Midnight Ride of Red Dog Ray". Performed throughout the province, with regular appearances at the Brunswick House on Bloor St. in Toronto. Fronted by "Reverend" Ken Ramsden on rhythm guitar and vocals, the group also included Hank "Washboard Hank" Fisher on washboard and vocals, Mathew "Cousin Matthew" Fines on lead guitar and vocals, Mike "Black-out/Blackie" Johnston on drums, and Earle "Stinkfoot" Hope on bass (although all members also played multiple other instruments). After Ramsden left, the group became Washboard Hank and the Honkers.

Later in his career Ken Ramsden became known for challenging a local bylaw in Peterborough over a postering incident. The Globe and Mail reported that the "charismatic" Ramsden, leader of the Lost Followers, "challenged the city of Peterborough's poster ban years ago and, with the help of various anarcho-syndicalist elements, carried the case all the way to the Supreme Court. And won." Washboard Hank went on to tour and record with Fred Eaglesmith as well as performing and recording on his own.

Hank and Ramsden reunited on November 3, 2019, their first show together in 30 years, for a one-off gig at Peterborough's Market Hall, backed by Hank's band The Wringers.

== Musical style ==
Their shows featured a repertoire mixing bluegrass, country, rock, and popular hits. Washboard Hank, without prior musical experience, joined the band after Ramsden set some of his poetry to music, thereby launching his career. Hank, additionally, invented the "fallopian tuba", a woodwind instrument crafted from a kitchen sink and ABS tubing, that was regularly showcased in the Reverend Ken show.

== Discography ==
- Rev. Ken & The Lost Followers - Balieboro / Midnight Ride of Red Dog Ray (1988) World Records WRC3-6174 (7-inch single)
- Washboard Hank - Donkeys & Tire Fires (1990) Washboard WB 423 (CD & Cassette, includes 4 songs by Rev. Ken & The Lost Followers)
