= Youth Emergency Shelter =

The YES Shelter For Youth and Families, formerly known as the Youth Emergency Shelter (YES), is located in the city of Peterborough, Ontario, Canada. It is a homeless shelter that provides three meals a day to clients and offers food boxes to those in need.

After over 40 years of planning, YES opened its doors on 20 December 2002. The official opening of the shelter occurred in February 2003 and was attended by both local and federal politicians including the Honourable Jane Stewart. While YES is a shelter for homeless youth and families, it is also an umbrella organization for other programs concerning this group of at-risk youth.

== Services ==
=== Emergency shelter for youth ===
YES is open and staffed 24 hours a day, 365 days a year. The shelter provides homeless youth and families with shelter, food, and support with accessing community resources in order to break the cycle of homelessness.

The length of stay is determined on a case-by-case basis, but the facility is not designed to provide permanent or long-term housing. Youth who stay at the shelter are expected to develop and follow a personal service plan with concrete goals concerning housing, schooling, and employment. They are also encouraged to develop strategies to work on personal challenges, ranging from past abuse or traumatic experiences to various addictions.

=== Transition facilities ===
In 2003, YES started operating a second-stage youth housing facility in Peterborough, Ontario, known as Abbott House, which it formally opened the following year. It started as a 10-bed 'rooming house' style home available to youth in need, providing them with an opportunity to learn to become good tenants. Applicants were required to have a source of income to pay monthly rent, and an on-site 'mentor' was available to the residents of Abbott House for support in pursuing their independent living goals.

=== On-site classroom ===
Carriage House is an on-site classroom staffed by one full-time and two part-time secondary school teachers. Carriage House is available to residents of YES, Abbott House and members of the community who have problems succeeding in a traditional school environment.

=== Work experience ===
Street Job was a six-month-long group work experience for 10 'street youth' between the ages of 16 and 24 who are unemployed and out of school. It was meant as an alternative to pan-handling with Street Job participants working on a number of community development projects of benefit to others in the area, while gaining much needed first job experience.

== See also ==
- Emergency shelter
