= Robert Watson (artist) =

American painter

Robert Watson (28 February 1923 – 14 December 2004) was an American artist born in Martinez, California. Watson provided the cover art for Ray Bradbury's The Martian Chronicles, second edition, printed in 1953.

Robert Watson was mostly self-taught artist. In the early 1940s he spent several years in New York City studying work at the Metropolitan Museum of Art. He also studied with Frederick Taubes at the University of Wisconsin before relocating to Berkeley, California.

In 1947, he held his first exhibition at Gump's in San Francisco. The show was favorably reviewed by San Francisco Chronicle Art Critic Alfred Frankenstein. In 1953, he painted the cover art for the 1953 edition of Ray Bradbury's The Martian Chronicles.

On May 17, 1997, Watson had a 50-year retrospective show at the Weinstein Gallery in San Francisco, California. Mayor Willie Brown proclaimed that day "Robert Watson Day".

Watson died at the age of 81 in Poway, California after a brief struggle with cancer.
