= Robert K. Watson =

American businessman

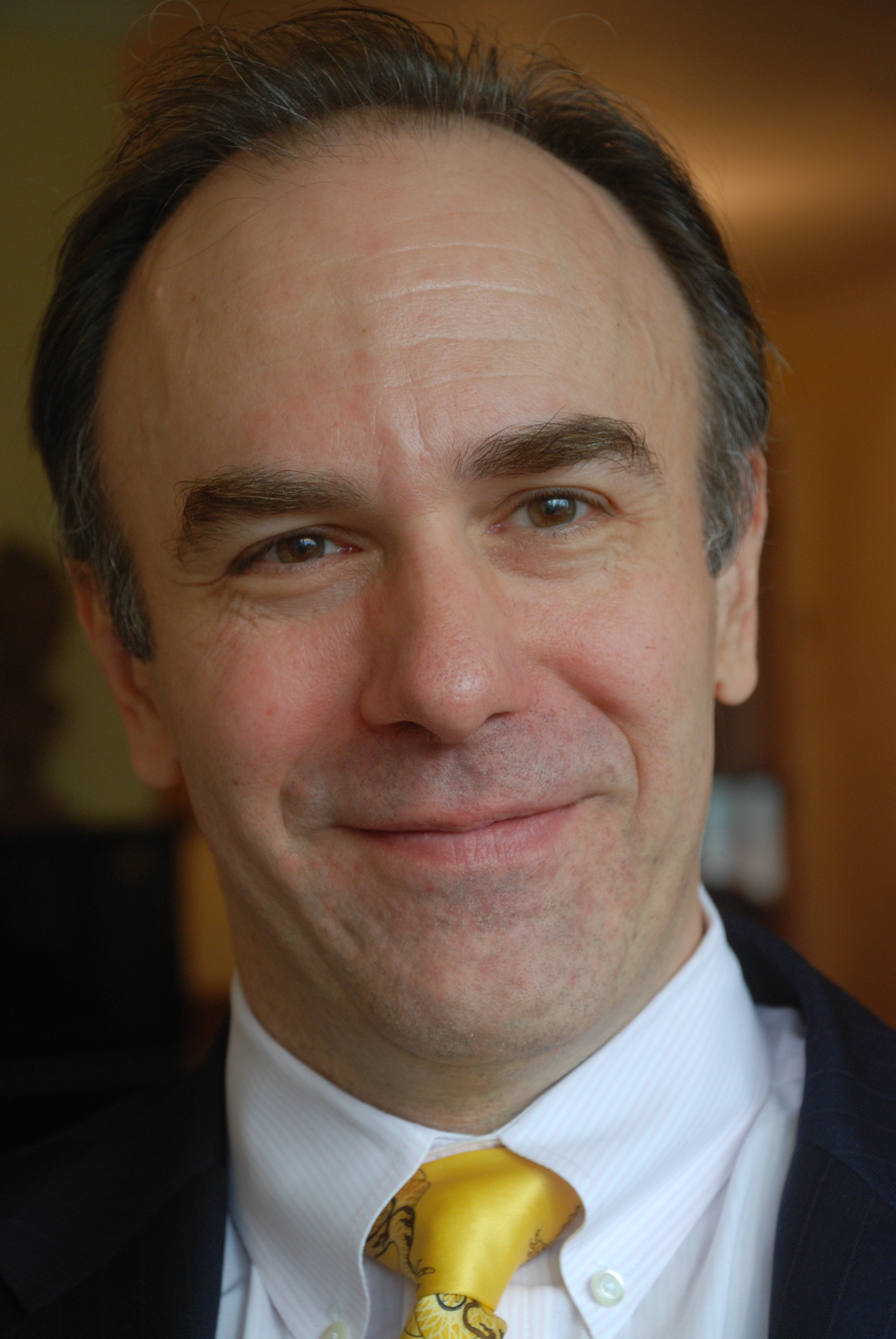
- Rob Watson
- Born: Chicago, Illinois
- Education: Dartmouth College (BA), University of California, Berkeley (MS), Columbia University (MBA)
- Known for: Market transformation, Circular Economy, Energy and Climate, "Father of LEED"

Robert "Rob" Watson is an international leader and expert in business and market transformation, circular economy, and green buildings. Working globally to solve large infrastructure and systems problems at scale, he founded the LEED Green Building Rating System of the United States Green Building Council (USGBC) in 1993 and was the LEED Steering Committee’s founding chairman and led its activity until 2006. In 2015, he founded the SWEEP Standard for sustainable materials management.

Watson was the first foreigner to have been honored by Ministry of Housing and Urban-Rural Development of the People's Republic of China with its first Green Innovation Award in Beijing in 2005. In 2002, he was named as the first recipient of the U.S. Green Building Council's Leadership Award For Lifetime Achievement for his work with the organization. His work has been featured in numerous publications, including Fortune Magazine and The Economist and has been referenced on multiple occasions by New York Times columnist, Thomas Friedman.

In Thomas Friedman's 2008 book, Hot, Flat, and Crowded, Watson is described as "one of the best environmental minds in America.". For its 2019 sestercentennial edition, Dartmouth Alumni Magazine recognized Rob as one of Dartmouth College’s “25 Most Influential Alumni” in its 250-year history.

== Life and work ==
Rob has spent nearly four decades conceiving and implementing climate and energy solutions through clean technology opportunities and market transformation policies, programs and projects on four continents that combine regulatory push with market pull to optimize environmental and economic outcomes.

From 1985 to 2006, as a senior scientist and director of the International Energy and Green Building programs at the Natural Resources Defense Council (NRDC), Watson was active in international sustainable building, utility and transportation issues in a dozen countries including China, the United States and Russia. Watson created the first documented, quantifiable “Green Office” in the U.S. for the Natural Resources Defense Council's NYC headquarters in 1987. Watson took primary responsibility for developing the green features of NRDC's showcase green offices in Washington, D.C., and the LEED Platinum Level Robert Redford Building in Los Angeles — at the time one of the highest recipients of LEED points in the world. He also consulted on the San Francisco office, which achieved LEED Gold Level Certification.

Watson was a member of the executive committee for the President's Council on Sustainable Development 1999 National Town Meeting and was the Operations Group Leader for the 1993 Greening of the White House initiative spearheaded by President Bill Clinton. In 1997, Watson worked with the Ministry of Construction of China to develop green building standards and energy codes for commercial and residential buildings. He also was the principal coordinator for ACCORD21, a key green building demonstration project in Beijing for the Ministry of Science and Technology of the People's Republic of China (MOST) and the U.S. Department of Energy (DOE). This building was the first to receive a LEED GOLD Certification in China.

Since 2007, he has been in a leadership role at four start-ups ranging from international and US-based green building services and technology companies to a zero waste technology. After helping to pioneer the green building concept as the "Father of LEED", Watson founded the EcoTech International Group (ETI) to meet the fast-growing demand for green building technologies and services in China, Russia, India and the United States. Since 2008, Watson also was an executive editor of GreenerBuildings.com where he blogged about the state of green building and other circular economic issues. In 2016-2017, Watson worked as Principal Investigator on Sustainable Tourism with the Secretariat for the Pacific Regional Environment Programme assessing the industry and outlining a sustainable market transformation plan, including country specific recommendations.

Watson has been honored with several national and international awards and has authored and been featured in numerous articles and publications worldwide. Watson was an adjunct professor at Columbia University School of International and Public Affairs (SIPA) between 2019 and 2021, and is a Principal at Upland Road, whose mission is to “Transform Tomorrow, Today" by building infrastructure and systems for a clean and resilient future.

== Education ==
Watson received a Master of Business Administration (MBA) from Columbia University, holds a Master of Science (MS) degree from the University of California, Berkeley Energy Resources Group (ERG) and is a graduate of Dartmouth College where he was a senior fellow. In 1993, Watson was the first Environmental Fellow at the Institute of Transportation Studies at University of California, Davis.

== See also ==
- U.S. Green Building Council
- Leadership in Energy and Environmental Design
