= Evansville Regional Airport =

Public airport in Indiana, US

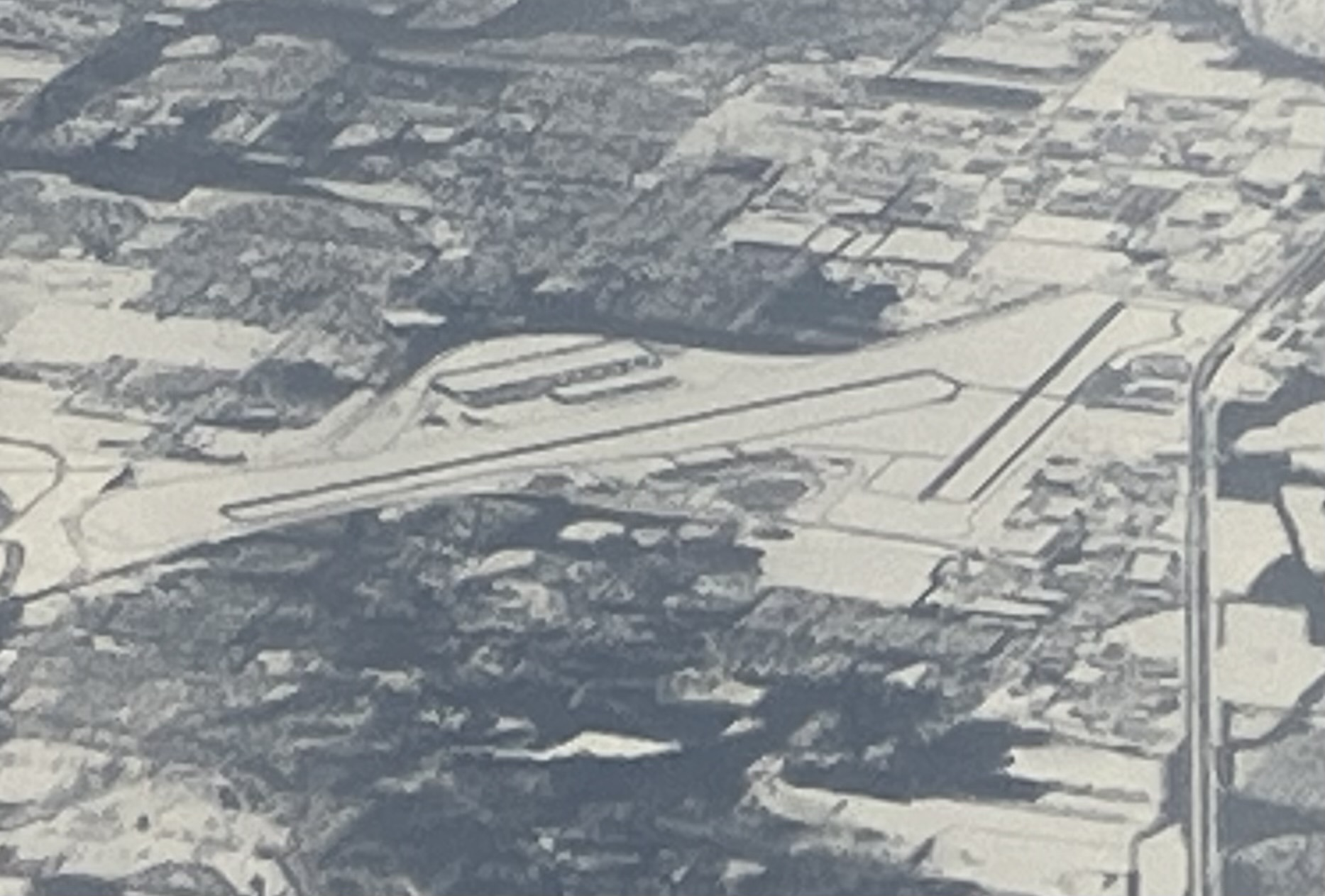
- IATA: EVV; ICAO: KEVV; FAA LID: EVV; WMO: 72432

Summary
- Airport type: Public
- Owner: Evansville-Vanderburgh Airport Authority District
- Operator: Evansville-Vanderburgh Airport Authority District
- Serves: Evansville metropolitan area
- Location: Evansville, Indiana, United States
- Opened: October 1928; 98 years ago
- Elevation AMSL: 422 ft (129 m)
- Coordinates: 38°02′18″N 087°31′51″W
- Website: www.flyevv.com

Maps
- FAA airport diagram
- Interactive map of Evansville Regional Airport

Runways
| Direction | Length | | Surface |
| Direction | ft | m | Surface |
|---|---|---|---|
| 4/22 | 8,021 | 2,445 | Asphalt |
| 18/36 | 6,286 | 1,916 | Asphalt |
| 9/27 | 3,497 | 1,066 | Asphalt |

Statistics (2021)
- Aircraft operations (year ending 6/30/2021): 34,693
- Based aircraft: 36
- Source: Federal Aviation Administration

Evansville Regional Airport (IATA: EVV, ICAO: KEVV, FAA LID: EVV) is three miles north of Evansville, in Vanderburgh County, Indiana, United States. It is owned and operated by the Evansville-Vanderburgh Airport Authority District.

Federal Aviation Administration records say the airport say EVV's annual traffic grew by nearly seven percent in 2018, in comparison to passenger counts the previous year. EVV reports that through December 2018, year-to-date enplanements, or passengers departing from EVV, totaled 235,082, surpassing the prior year's traffic that totaled 220,046 passengers. EVV's total number of travelers, which includes the passengers who flew in to EVV from other airports, also grew last year, to nearly a half million people annually. EVV's passenger traffic has grown by 35 percent in only four years. It is the fourth largest airport in the state of Indiana after Fort Wayne International Airport, South Bend International Airport, and Indianapolis International Airport.

The National Plan of Integrated Airport Systems for 2017–2021 calls it a non-hub primary service airport (more than 10,000 enplanements per year).

Evansville Regional Airport was also served by Lake Central Airlines which merged into Allegheny Airlines in 1968, which later became USAir and then US Airways

== History ==
Built in 1928 on 260 acres (1.1 km^{2}) of land along U.S. Highway 41 and funded by a city bond issue, the original airport had a small terminal, weather bureau, hangar, runways, boundary lights, grading, and drainage.

On June 16, 1930, the Evansville Municipal Airport was dedicated. The runways, 100 × 1,200 feet and four inches thick, cost $30,000. The first airport manager was Werner J. Genot, who took charge on December 16, 1930.

Interstate Airlines stopped at Evansville on their Chicago–Atlanta and St. Louis – Louisville routes on October 19, 1928. Also in 1928, Capital Air Corporation started passenger flights through Evansville. The airport did not have an airline from February 1933 until 1940, when Eastern Airlines started two departures a day. Plans were made for expansion.

In 1950 a new terminal opened at a cost of $787,000. The Evansville city council passed an ordinance to change the name of the airport to Dress Memorial Airport on October 11, 1950, and on October 29, 1950, the new terminal was dedicated. The airport property now covered 467 acres; 347 acres was used for aircraft operations and 120 acres was used for agriculture.

The first jet at the Evansville airport landed in September 1964, a chartered 727 carrying presidential candidate Barry Goldwater.

The original terminal was replaced in 1988 with the new William H. Dress Terminal, designed by Hafer Associates with 140,000 square feet (13,000 m^{2}) and ten gates.

In January 2012, the airport announced the adding of four new jet bridges. At the beginning of 2013, the jet bridges were installed. This allowed passengers to avoid having to exit the terminal and board the plane from the outside. It was the first time that Evansville Regional Airport had new jet bridges, since USAir exited the Evansville market in the 1990s. A subsequent ribbon cutting took place at the airport on January 17, 2013.

In the 2010s, the airport began to see passenger growth. In response to this, on August 20, 2014, Delta Air Lines upgraded to a Boeing 717 with daily service to Atlanta. Delta further upgraded to a McDonnell Douglas MD-88 at the beginning of summer in 2015, in addition with current 717 service, occasionally replacing the smaller aircraft on some flights. Currently Delta runs the 717 service for its first flight out of Evansville and its late flight into Evansville. Delta has recently stopped their 717 service in Evansville due to aging aircraft, but has replaced that aircraft with the Bombardier CRJ-900 for its Atlanta service. Also, on October 2, 2014, American Eagle began daily service to Charlotte using a Bombardier CRJ-200. On June 4, 2015, United Express began three daily flights to O'Hare International Airport in Chicago utilizing the Embraer ERJ-145. Currently American Eagle uses an Embraer 175 for its Dallas-Fort Worth service.

After further growth and expansion at the airport, the Vanderburgh Airport Authority approved the construction of a fifth jet bridge in Concourse A. Furthermore, on June 2, 2016, Allegiant Air began flights to Orlando/Sanford, operating two weekly flights on Sunday and Thursday utilizing the McDonnell Douglas MD-80. The flights are now operated on Airbus A320 aircraft.

On November 8, 2021, Evansville Regional announced that United Airlines was pulling their daily flights to Chicago. Evansville was one of 15 other airports that United pulled service from.

On March 3, 2022, Evansville Regional announced American Airlines has paused their daily Chicago flights. With this pause, Evansville has no direct flights to Chicago. Days later it was also released that Delta has suspended their Detroit service from Evansville for an undetermined amount of time.

On November 8, 2023, it was announced beginning in February 2024 Breeze Airways will begin twice weekly air service to/from Orlando International (MCO) making this the second Orlando flight service for the Evansville Regional Airport.

On September 4, 2024, American Airlines resumed their flights to Chicago, ending two and a half years of no direct air service linking Evansville with Chicago.

== Facilities ==
Evansville Regional Airport covers 1,250 acres (506 ha) at an elevation of 422 feet (127 m). It has three asphalt runways: 4/22 is 8,021 by 150 feet (2,445 × 46 m); 18/36 is 6,286 by 150 feet (1,916 × 46 m); 9/27 is 3,497 by 75 feet (1,066 × 23 m).

The airport has an instrument landing system.

In the year ending June 30, 2021, the airport had 34,693 aircraft operations, averaging 95 per day: 60% general aviation, 28% air taxi, 8% military, and 4% airline. 36 aircraft were then based at the airport: 36 single-engine, 7 multi-engine, 4 jet, and 1 helicopter

In 2020 the airport completed a covered parking area covered with solar panels, the largest such installation in the midwest.

== Terminal ==
The terminal boasts a number of amenities and services for visitors, including a business lounge, restaurant, kids area, and conference room. Visitors can browse a collection of airplane models with brief facts on each of the planes. The concourse has an observation area. Valets are available outside to assist with luggage and parking. Hotel shuttles to different lodging accommodations in the Evansville area can be requested in the front of the terminal.

The terminal has two concourses. Concourse A has three jet bridges and one hardstand gate, while Concourse B has two jet bridges and six hardstand gates. Each concourse has vending machines, restrooms, and drinking fountains.

Delta operates out of Concourse A, while Allegiant and American operate out of Concourse B.

== Airlines and destinations ==
=== Passenger ===
| Airlines | Destinations |
|---|---|
| Allegiant Air | Orlando/Sanford, St. Petersburg/Clearwater; Seasonal: Destin/Fort Walton Beach |
| American Eagle | Charlotte, Chicago–O'Hare, Dallas/Fort Worth |
| Breeze Airways | Orlando |
| Delta Connection | Atlanta |

=== Cargo ===
The following airlines offer scheduled cargo service:

| Airlines | Destinations |

== Statistics ==
=== Top destinations ===
Top domestic destinations (May 2025 – April 2026)
| Rank | Airport | Passengers | Airlines |
|---|---|---|---|
| 1 | (Georgia (U.S. state)) Atlanta, Georgia | 67,880 | Delta |
| 2 | Dallas, Texas | 52,510 | American |
| 3 | Charlotte, North Carolina | 36,040 | American |
| 4 | Chicago-O'Hare, Illinois | 26,830 | American |
| 5 | Orlando-Sanford, Florida | 18,580 | Allegiant |
| 6 | St. Petersburg/Clearwater, Florida | 14,610 | Allegiant |
| 7 | Orlando, Florida | 9,260 | Breeze |
| 8 | Destin-Fort Walton Beach, Florida | 4,090 | Allegiant |

=== Airline market share ===
Largest airlines at EVV (May 2025 – April 2026)
| Rank | Airline | Passengers | Share |
|---|---|---|---|
| 1 | Endeavor Air | 131,000 | 28.62% |
| 2 | Envoy Air | 121,000 | 26.39% |
| 3 | Piedmont Airlines | 76,080 | 16.57% |
| 4 | Allegiant Air | 73,530 | 16.02% |
| 5 | PSA Airlines | 30,980 | 6.75% |
| — | Other | 25,890 | 5.64% |

=== On-Time Performance (Major U.S. Carriers Only) ===
On-time performance by calendar year
| Year | Percent of on time departures | Percent of on time arrivals | Average departure delay (min) | Average arrival delay (min) | Percent of cancelled flights |
|---|---|---|---|---|---|
| 2020 | 86% | 85% | 73.29 | 53.99 | 5.27% |
| 2021 | 88% | 87% | 74.39 | 53.62 | 1.42% |
| 2022 | 84% | 81% | 91.97 | 60.49 | 2.75% |
| 2023 | 86% | 86% | 101.91 | 76.97 | 0.53% |
| 2024 | 82% | 79% | 96.95 | 70.86 | 1.19% |
| 2025 | 85% | 87% | 117.81 | 86.40 | 1.05% |

== Former air service ==
Previous service included Century Airlines, Trans World Express, Eastern Air Lines, Air Illinois, USAir, Piedmont Airlines, Chicago Express Airlines, Atlantic Southeast Airlines, Northwest Airlink, Comair, Britt Airways, Cape Air, Interstate Airlines, Capital Air, and United (operating as United Express)

== Accidents and incidents ==
- On April 21, 1943, a USAF Lockheed Lodestar stalled and crashed at EVV during a go-around, all 10 occupants were killed.
- On March 20, 1968, a Delta Air Lines Convair CV-340 made a single-engine landing at Evansville in rain and low ceiling conditions and crash-landed after aborting a go-around. All three crew and 39 passengers survived, but the plane was damaged beyond repair and written off.
- On December 13, 1977, Douglas C-53 N51071 of National Jet Services, operating as Air Indiana Flight 216, crashed on take-off from Evansville on a non-scheduled passenger flight to Nashville Metropolitan Airport, Tennessee. All 29 people on board were killed, including the entire University of Evansville basketball team. The cause of the accident was that the gust locks had not been removed and the aircraft was improperly loaded, resulting in an aft center of gravity.
- On February 6, 1992, a C-130 military transport aircraft operated by the Kentucky Air National Guard, with five crew aboard, crashed at 9:48 A.M. one mile south of the airport in the parking lot of JoJo's restaurant in connection with the Drury Inn on U.S. Highway 41 intersecting Lynch Road. 17 people were killed in the crash and 15 others were injured. Both JoJo's restaurant and Drury Inn just south of the airport were damaged but were repaired and continued operating, although the former JoJo's building now houses a Denny's restaurant, and the former Drury Inn is now a Comfort Inn & Suites.

== See also ==
- Evansville Wartime Museum
- Indiana World War II Army Airfields
- List of airports in Indiana
