= James McKenty =

Canadian musician and recording engineer

James McKenty is a Canadian musician and recording engineer. His band The Spades, in which he played guitar, were a roots rock band that released four records produced by Gord Sinclair, Burning on fumes in 2004, Let it Grow in 2008, Subatomic in 2010 and Live from the Narrows in 2012

In 2012, McKenty engineered Cuff The Duke's Juno nominated Morning comes and again in 2013 their album Union. In 2013, James engineered and mixed Blue Rodeo's record In our nature which became the highest chart placement for first week sales in the band's history.

McKenty has also engineered albums for many other artists, including Melissa Payne, Tara Williamson, Royal Wood and the Weber Brothers.
