= Peterborough Folk Festival =

Music, arts, and community festival in Peterborough, Ontario

Coordinates: 44.3167°N 78.3124°W

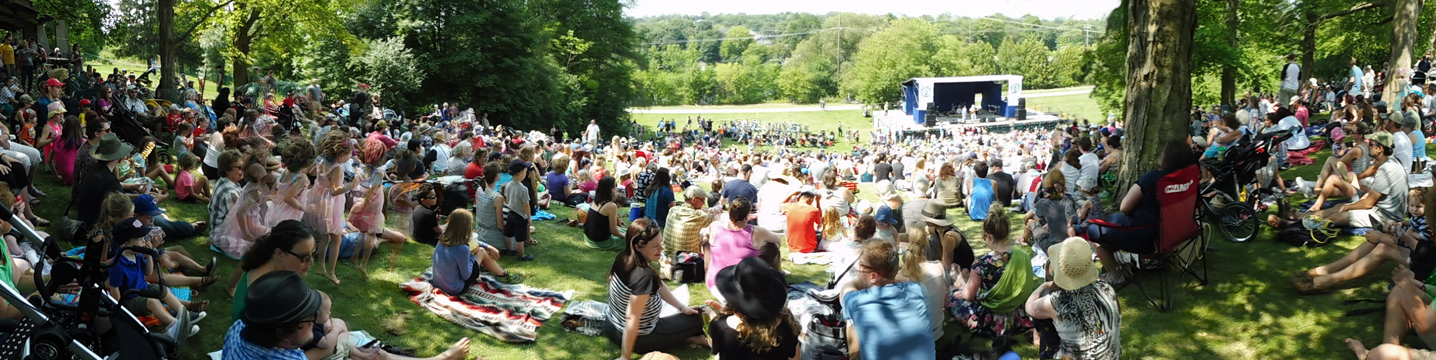
Crowd watching Sharon and Bram on stage at the 2017 Peterborough Folk Festival

The Peterborough Folk Festival is a three-day music, arts, and community festival in Peterborough, Ontario. The festival is a non-profit organization which receives funding from the Lloyd Carr-Harris Foundation, The Department of Canadian Heritage -Arts Presentation Canada Program, and The City of Peterborough as well as private and corporate donations. It is one of the last free folk festivals in Ontario.

The mandate of the PFF is to present high-quality music from a broad range of genres and cultures, as well as to foster community education and interaction.

In 2001, the PFF introduced the Emerging Artist Award. Designed to promote and support young artists from the Peterborough Region, the award is given annually to an artist who has demonstrated skill as a songwriter and performer. The first winner of this award was Canadian musician Serena Ryder.

== Emerging Artist Award Winners ==
2001 - Serena Ryder
2002 - James McKenty (James McKenty and The Spades)
2003 - Jill Staveley (The Staveley Project)
2004 - Beau Dixon
2005 - Benj Rowland (The County Boys)
2006 - Drea Nasager
2007 - Dave Simard and Kelly McMichaels
2008 - Sean P. Conway
2009 - Missy Knott
2010 - Kate LeDeuce
2011 - Melissa Payne
2012 - Jos. Fortin
2013 - Dylan Ireland
2014 - The Lonely Parade
2015 - Evangeline Gentle
2016 - Nick Procyshyn
2017 - Mary-Kate Edwards
2018 - Hillary Dumoulin
2019 - Paper Shakers
2021 - Lauryn Macfarlane
2022 - Nathan Truax
2023 - Irish Millie / Nicholas Campbell (musician) (two awards)
2024 - Calvin Bakelaar aka VANCAMP
