= Juno Award for Reggae Recording of the Year =

Yearly award for best reggae album in Canada

The Juno Award for "Reggae Recording of the Year" has been awarded since 1985, as recognition each year for the best reggae album or single in Canada.

The award was not presented in 1992 or 1993, during which time reggae albums were subsumed into the new World Beat Recording category, but a separate reggae category was reinstituted in 1994 and has been presented continuously since then.

It is one of several categories that media reports in September 2024 indicated would be placed on "hiatus" for the Juno Awards of 2025, with the award committee reversing the decision eight days after it was first reported.

== Best Reggae/Calypso Recording (1985–1991) ==
Year	Winner	Album	Nominees	Ref.
1985	Liberty Silver and Otis Gayle	Heaven Must Have Sent You	Camboulay Dub – Mojah; Trade Winds '84 – Trade Winds; Sattalites – Sattalites; Higher Love – Syren	
1986	Lillian Allen	Revolutionary Tea Party	Free South Africa – Jayson; Moonlight Lover – Ras Lee; Night Rider – Messenjah; No One Can Love Me Like You Do – George Banton	
1987	Leroy Sibbles	Mean While	Chant, Chant – Errol Blackwood; Crazy – Messenjah; Empty Promises – Adrian Miller; Live Via Sattalites – Sattalites	
No award ceremony was held in 1988
1989	Lillian Allen	Conditions Critical	Give Peace a Chance – Errol Blackwood; I Like Calypso – Elsworth James; Shadrock – Chester Miller; War On Drugs – Devon Haughton	
1990	Sattalites	Too Late To Turn Back Now	Chuckie Prophesy – Clifton Joseph; Soca Band – Elsworth James; South Africa Is a Disgrace – Leroy Sibbles; Tribute to Ben Johnson – Elsworth James	
1991	Jayson & Friends	Soldiers We Are All	Broken Arrow – Mojah; Eyes Like Fire – Leroy Sibbles; Rock and Sway – Messenjah; Wild Jockey – Jackie Mittoo	

== Best Reggae Recording (1994–2002) ==
Year	Winner	Album	Nominees	Ref.
1994	Snow	"Informer"	"Child Support" – Inspector Lenny; "Love and Affection" – Tanya Mullings; "Save the Children" – Leejahn; "Secret Admirer" – D.J. Ray	
1995	Carla Marshall	Class and Credential	"A Love Thang" – Tanya Mullings; "Lazah Current" – Lazah Current; "Smokin' the Goats" – One; "The Sound" – Fujahtive	
1996	Sattalites	"Now and Forever"	"Real Personal" – Tanya Mullings; "Si Wi Dem Nuh Know We" – Snow; "Something Real" – Lazo; "Waking Up the Dream" – Errol Blackwood	
1997	Nana McLean	Nana McLean	Just the Other Night – Lenn Hammond; Rise Up! – Kali and Dub; Rude Boy on the Bus – Adrian Miller; time bomb – Tatix	
1998	Messenjah	Catch De Vibe	"Cry for the Children" – Jahbeng; "Flex (Dancehall Mix)" – Belinda Brady; Justuss – Snow; "Nice & Slow" – Leroy Brown	
1999	Frankie Wilmot	Vision	Chains and Shackles – Inspector Lenny; Glorious Ride – Lazah Current; The Original – DJ Ray; The Way I Feel – Mystics	
2000	Lazo	Heart & Soul	Hard End – The Luge Sessions; Sometimes – Choices; Thanks and Devotion – Willi Williams; What If I Told You – Andru Branch	
2001	Lenn Hammond	Lenn Hammond	Dem Need More Love – Tasha T; Jonah – Jason Wilson and Tabarruk; Love Is On Your Side – Lazo; Secret Emotion – Jimmy Reid	
2002	Blessed	Love (African Woman)	"A Friend for Life" – Iley Dread; "Breathe" – Sonia Collymore; "Never Let Jah Go" – Chester Miller; "They Called Me Madness" – Peculiar I	

== Reggae Recording of the Year (2003–present) ==
Year	Winner	Album	Nominees	Ref.
2003	Sonia Collymore	"You Won't See Me Cry"	Gifted Man – Belinda Brady feat. Carla Marshall; Heartache – Leroy Brown; You Won't See Me Cry – Sonia Collymore; She Boom – Kulcha Connection; Two Hands Clapping – Snow	
2004	Leroy Brown	"Rent A Tile"	"Homie's Girl" – Carl Henry; "Nana's Medley, Part 2" – Nana McLean; "Smile" – Blessed; "Tease Me" — Dezzie	
2005	Sonia Collymore	"WYSIWYG (What You See Is What You Get)"	Bare as She Dare – Carl Henry featuring Ce'Ceile; Empty Barrel – Blessed featuring Kardinal Offishall; It's All Bless – Korexion; Uncorrupted – Steele	
2006	Blessed	"Reggae Time"	Hot Gal – Carl Henry feat. Rally Bop; Live Up – Truths and Rights; Mind & Body – Sold Odel; River of Healing – Jah Beng	
2007	Korexion	"X-Rated"	Hard to See – Humble; In the Streets – Trinity Chris feat. Blessed; Kulcha Connection – Kulcha Connection; Survival – Kwesi Selassie	
2008	Mikey Dangerous	"Don't Go Pretending"	"Don't Go" – Korexion; "Final Road" – Blessed; Music Is My Life – Tanya Mullings; Two Chord Skankin' – Lyndon John X	
2009	Humble	"Everything"	"Jah Lift Me Up" – Blessed; "Renegade Rocker" – Dubmatix; "The Peacemaker’s Chauffeur" – Jason Wilson; "Truth Will Reveal" – Souljah Fyah	
2010	Dubmatix feat. Prince Blanco	"Gonna Be Alright"	American Dream – Carl Henry; Breaking Up – Tanya Mullings; Show Me The Way – Kim Davis; Wha-La-La-Leng – Ghislain Poirier with Face-T	
2011	Elaine Lil'Bit Shepherd	"Likkle But Mi Tallawah"	Brighter Days – Lyndon John X; "Don’t Wanna Go" – Tonya P; Million Chance – Tony Anthony; System Shakedown – Dubmatix	
2012	Exco Levi	"Bleaching Shop"	"Lover's Paradise" – Jay Douglas; "Seeds of Love & Life" – Dubmatix; "Rescue Me" – Tanya Mullings; "Woman" – Steele	
2013	Exco Levi	"Storms of Life"	"Radio" – Ammoye; "Made for Love" – Melanie Durrant; "Yours to Keep" – Makeshift Innocence; Move Ya’ – Elaine Lil'Bit Shepherd	
2014	Exco Levi	"Strive"	"Mandela" – Akustix; "Baby It's You" – Ammoye; "Love Collision" – Dru; "Rebel Massive" – Dubmatix	
2015	Exco Levi	"Welcome the King"	"Love Inna Wi Heart" – Kirk Diamond feat. Bob da Builda; Wake Up – Mikey Dangerous; Hold On Till I Die – Steele; Real Talk – Tasha T	
2016	Kafinal feat. Daddy U Roy	"Nah Complain"	The French Sessions – Dubmatix; "Hello Mama" – Exco Levi; "Sexy Gal" – Kreesha Turner feat. T.O.K.; Escape from the Mongoose Gang – Lyndon John X	
2017	Exco Levi	"Siren"	"Sorry" – Ammoye; "Roll 'Dem" – Dubmatix feat. Gappy Ranks; "Cry Every Day" – Blessed; "Who Feels It Knows" – Jay Kartier	
2018	Kirk Diamond	"Greater"	The Light – Ammoye; "Hold Up Slow Down" – Blessed; "Neva Judge" – Eyesus; "Love How You Whine" – K'Coneil feat. Kreesha Turner	
2019	Dubmatix	Sly & Robbie meet Dubmatix — Overdubbed	Money Don't Grow Pon Trees – Blessed; Genesis – Chelsea Stewart; Narrative – Exco Levi; Talk or No Talk – Kafinal feat. Queen Ifrica	
2020	Lyndon John X	The Warning Track	"Jah Children" – Jay Douglas; "Wah Gwaan" – Exco Levi; "Never Broken" – Petraa; "Another Man" – Storry	
2021	Töme and Sean Kingston	I Pray	Give It All — Ammoye; Black Man — Blessed; Roots Rock — Dubmatix; Let It Be Done — Kirk Diamond	
2022	Kairo McLean	"Easy Now"	"By Any Means" — Exco Levi; "Don't Let It Get to You" — Josemar; "Herb Dream" — Blessed; "Too Ruff" — Kirk Diamond and Finn	
2023	Kirk Diamond feat. Kairo McLean and Finn	"Reggae Party"	Ammoye, "Water"; Celena, "Like a Star"; Exco Levi, "Jah Love"; Kairo McLean, "In the Streets"	
2024	Kirk Diamond feat. Finn	Dread	Ammoye, "Stir This Thing"; Jah'Mila, Roots Girl; Exco Levi, "Feel Like Home"; Omega Mighty feat. 4Korners and Haviah Mighty, "Rush Dem"	
2025	Exco Levi	Born to Be Free	King Cruff and Runkus, Fall Back; Tonya P, Rise; Lee Scratch Perry and Bob Riddim, Destiny; Skystar, Sky's the Limit	
2026	Naomi Cowan	"Welcome to Paradise"	Kirk Diamond, "Deh Yah"; Jojo You Made That, Yung 2nuff, Erin B, Topman Meeko, One Don & Enzooo, "Dagga Riddim Cypher"; Exco Levi and Kheilstone, "Ready for You"; Samora and Ammoye, "More Reggae (Funk It Up)"	
