= Juno Awards of 2018 =

Canadian music awards ceremony

- The 2018 Juno Awards Logo
- Date: 24–25 March 2018
- Venue: Rogers Arena, Vancouver, British Columbia
- Hosted by: Michael Bublé

Television/radio coverage
- Network: CBC

The Juno Awards of 2018, honouring Canadian music achievements, were presented in Vancouver, British Columbia during the weekend of 24–25 March 2018. The primary telecast ceremonies were held at Rogers Arena. Vancouver previously hosted the Juno Awards in 1991, 1998 and 2009. Michael Bublé hosted these awards after having stepped down from his scheduled hosting the previous year due to his son's cancer diagnosis. Nominations were announced on 6 February 2018.

Changes in 2018 from previous years include the reintroduction of the Juno Award for Comedy Album of the Year, a category which has not been awarded since 1984, and the ceremony's television broadcast returning to CBC Television, after previously being broadcast by CTV.

== Potential host city bids ==
In September 2015, the Capital Region Music Awards Society in Victoria, British Columbia announced its intention to bid for hosting the 2018 Juno Awards. Victoria made a bid to host the 2014 Junos, but that year's ceremonies were hosted in Winnipeg.

In April 2016, various groups in Edmonton were also investigating a potential bid for the 2018 Juno Awards. The city previously hosted the Junos in 2004.

In early April 2017, Vancouver was announced as the 2018 Juno Awards host after the 2017 awards concluded. On 19 April 2017, it was announced that CBC Television would take over broadcast rights to the Junos beginning in 2018, their first since 2001.

== Events ==
Jann Arden and Bob Rock performed and hosted at the Songwriters' Circle on 25 March, prior to the main awards ceremony. The Juno Cup charity hockey game between musicians and former NHL players was held at the Bill Copeland Sports Centre in Burnaby on 23 March.

== Performers ==
Performers for the main ceremony included Jessie Reyez, Arkells, Daniel Caesar, Lights, Arcade Fire, Dallas Green and Sarah Harmer. Canadian pop-rock band Hedley were originally part of the Juno lineup, but pulled out due to sexual harassment allegations against lead singer and 2015 host Jacob Hoggard On 19 February, Hedley announced that they withdrew all their nominations from the Juno Awards.

List of musical performances
Artist(s)	Song(s)
Main show
Arcade Fire	"Everything Now"
The Jerry Cans	"Ukiuq"
Shawn Hook & the B.C. Youth Chinese Orchestra	"Reminding Me"
Lights	"Giants"
Daniel Caesar	"Freudian" "We Find Love"
Northern Touch All-Stars: Checkmate, Choclair, Misfit, Kardinal Offishall, Red1, Thrust	"Northern Touch"
Sarah Harmer; City and Colour; Kevin Hearn	Tribute to Gord Downie "Introduce Yerself" "Bobcaygeon"
Arkells	"Knocking at the Door"
Diana Krall & Michael Bublé	"L-O-V-E"
Jessie Reyez & Daniel Caesar	"Figures, a Reprise"
Barenaked Ladies with Steven Page	"One Week" "If I Had $1000000"

== Presenters ==
=== Main Show ===
- Michael Bublé — Presented Arcade Fire
- Andrea Bang (from Kim's Convenience) and Mark McMorris (Canadian Olympic Snowboarder) — Presented R&B/Soul Recording of The Year
- Mélanie Joly (Canadian Heritage Minister) and Jasmyn Burke (Weaves) — Presented Breakthrough Artist of the Year
- Buffy Sainte-Marie and Grimes — Presented Lights
- Northern Touch All-Stars: Rascalz, Checkmate, Kardinal Offishall, Thrust and Choclair — Presented Rap Recording of The Year, performed the single "Northern Touch" and presented Daniel Caesar
- Kevin Drew and Pearl Wenjack — Presented Sarah Harmer and City and Colour for the Gord Downie Tribute
- Geddy Lee — Presented the Barenaked Ladies for their induction into the Canadian Music Hall of Fame
- Jann Arden and Bob Rock — Presented Album of The Year and Michael Bublé
- Michael Bublé — Presented Diana Krall
- Ruth B, Scott Helman and Charlotte Cardin — Presented Fan Choice Award
- Ria Mae and Tyler Connolly (Tyler) — Presented Artist of The Year

== Nominees and winners ==
Barenaked Ladies are the year's inductees into the Canadian Music Hall of Fame. Former band member Steven Page joined the band and performed at the primary Juno ceremonies. They were inducted by Geddy Lee of Rush.

Denise Donlon, a former personality of MuchMusic and former president of Sony Music Canada, is the 2018 recipient of the Walt Grealis Special Achievement Award for her contributions to the Canadian music industry.

Gary Slaight is the recipient of the Humanitarian Award. He and his father founded the Slaight Family Foundation which supports music industry and artist development, healthcare and other social causes. As of this year, the Humanitarian Award is no longer named after Allan Waters. Slaight received the Walt Grealis Special Achievement Award at the 2012 Juno Awards.

=== People ===
Artist of the Year	Group of the Year
Gord Downie; Daniel Caesar; Lights; Ruth B; Shania Twain	A Tribe Called Red; Alvvays; Arcade Fire; Broken Social Scene; ~~Hedley~~ - nomination withdrawn
Breakthrough Artist of the Year	Breakthrough Group of the Year
Jessie Reyez; Allan Rayman; Charlotte Cardin; Nav; Virginia to Vegas	The Beaches; James Barker Band; The Dead South; The Franklin Electric; The Jerry Cans
Fan Choice Award	Songwriter of the Year
Shawn Mendes; Alessia Cara; Arkells; Jessie Reyez; Justin Bieber; Shawn Hook; The Weeknd; Theory; Walk Off the Earth; ~~Hedley~~ - nomination withdrawn	Gord Downie and Kevin Drew — "A Natural", "Introduce Yerself", "The North" from Introduce Yerself by Gord Downie; Amelia Curran — "Come Back for Me", "Watershed", "Try" from Watershed by Amelia Curran; Charlotte Cardin — "Main Girl", "Paradise Motion", "The Kids" from Main Girl by Charlotte Cardin; Rose Cousins — "Chosen," "Grace" (co-songwriter Mark Erelli), "White Flag" (co-songwriter KS Rhoads) from Conclusion by Rose Cousins; Scott Helman — "21 Days" (co-songwriters Simon Wilcox, Thomas "Tawgs" Salter, Michael J. Wise, Ron Lopata), "It's Kinda Complicated" (co-songwriters Thomas "Tawgs" Salter, Todd Clark, Ron Lopata), "PDA" (co-songwriters Simon Wilcox, Thomas "Tawgs" Salter, Ron Lopata) from Hôtel de Ville by Scott Helman
Producer of the Year	Recording Engineer of the Year
Diana Krall — "L-O-V-E", "Night and Day" (Diana Krall); Brian Howes and Jason Van Poederooyen — ~~"Better Days" (Hedley)~~, "The Drugs" (Mother Mother); Felix Cartal — "Get What You Give", "Drifting Away" (Felix Cartal); Jordan Evans and Matthew Burnett — "Get You" (Daniel Caesar feat. Kali Uchis), "We Find Love" (Daniel Caesar); Tawgs Salter — "PDA" (Scott Helman)	Riley Bell — "Get You" (Daniel Caesar feat. Kali Uchis), "We Find Love" (Daniel Caesar); Ben Kaplan — "Widowmaker" (Five Alarm Funk), "Speak" (Ninjaspy); Eric Ratz — "Knocking at the Door" (Arkells), "My Little RnR" (Danko Jones); Gus van Go — "Paradise" (Terra Lightfoot), "Boys Like You" (Whitehorse); Shawn Everett — "Slip Away" (Perfume Genius), "Pain" (The War on Drugs)

=== Albums ===
Album of the Year	Adult Alternative Album of the Year
Arcade Fire, Everything Now; Johnny Reid, Revival; Michael Bublé, Nobody But Me; Ruth B, Safe Haven; Shania Twain, Now	Gord Downie, Introduce Yerself; Leif Vollebekk, Twin Solitude; Terra Lightfoot, New Mistakes; Timber Timbre, Sincerely, Future Pollution; Whitehorse, Panther in the Dollhouse
Adult Contemporary Album of the Year	Alternative Album of the Year
Michael Bublé, Nobody But Me; Alysha Brilla, Rooted; Johnny Reid, Revival; Nuela Charles, The Grand Hustle; The Tenors, Christmas Together	Alvvays, Antisocialites; Arcade Fire, Everything Now; Land of Talk, Life After Youth; Tanya Tagaq, Retribution; Weaves, Wide Open
Blues Album of the Year	Children's Album of the Year
MonkeyJunk, Time to Roll; Big Dave McLean, Better the Devil You Know; Downchild, Something I've Done; Steve Strongman, No Time Like Now; Williams, Wayne and Isaak, Big City, Back Country Blues	Fred Penner, Hear the Music; Big Block SingSong, Greatest Hits, Vol. 3; Bobs & LoLo, Blue Skies; Splash 'n Boots, Love, Kisses and Hugs; The Moblees, The Moblees
Classical Album of the Year – Solo or Chamber Ensemble	Classical Album of the Year – Large Ensemble or Soloist(s) with Large Ensemble Accompaniment
Janina Fialkowska, Chopin Recital 3; ARC Ensemble, Chamber Works by Szymon Laks; David Jalbert, Stravinsky & Prokofiev: Transcriptions pour piano; James Ehnes with Andrew Armstrong, Beethoven: Violin Sonatas Nos. 6 & 9 "Kreutzer"; Louis Lortie, Louis Lortie Plays Chopin, Vol. 5	Jan Lisiecki with NDR Elbphilharmonie Orchestra, Chopin: Works for Piano & Orchestra; Arion Orchestre Baroque, Rebelles Baroques; James Ehnes with Royal Liverpool Philharmonic, Beethoven & Schubert: Violin Concerto; Johannes Moser with Orchestre de la Suisse Romande, Elgar & Tchaikovsky; Winnipeg Symphony Orchestra with Nunavut Sivuniksavut, The Shaman & Arctic Symphony
Classical Album of the Year – Vocal or Choral Performance	Contemporary Christian/Gospel Album of the Year
Barbara Hannigan with Ludwig Orchestra, Crazy Girl Crazy; Daniel Taylor with The Trinity Choir, The Tree of Life; Gerald Finley with Bergen Philharmonic Orchestra, In the Stream of Life: Songs by Sibelius; Isabel Bayrakdarian with Coro Vox Aeterna, Mother of Light: Armenian Hymns & Chants in Praise of Mary; Philippe Sly and John Charles Britton, Schubert Sessions: Lieder with Guitar	The Color, First Day of My Life; Jon Neufeld, We Are Free; Love & the Outcome, These Are the Days; Manafest, Stones; Matt Maher, Echoes
Country Album of the Year	Electronic Album of the Year
James Barker Band, Game On; Dean Brody, Beautiful Freakshow; High Valley, Dear Life; Jess Moskaluke, Past the Past; Tim Hicks, Shake These Walls	Rezz, Mass Manipulation; Blue Hawaii, Tenderness; CRi, Someone Else; Dabin, Two Hearts; Kid Koala feat. Emiliana Torrini, Music to Draw to: Satellite
Francophone Album of the Year	Indigenous Music Album of the Year
Daniel Bélanger, Paloma; Alex Nevsky, Nos Eldorados; Klô Pelgag, L'Étoile thoracique; Patrice Michaud, Almanach; Pierre Lapointe, La Science du cœur	Buffy Sainte-Marie, Medicine Songs; DJ Shub, PowWowStep; Indian City, Here & Now; Iskwé, The Fight Within; Kelly Fraser, Sedna; Sainte-Marie's award was rescinded in 2025 over citizenship requirements.
Instrumental Album of the Year	International Album of the Year
Do Make Say Think, Stubborn Persistent Illusions; Five Alarm Funk, Sweat; Kristofer Maddigan, Cuphead; Oktopus, Hapax; Peregrine Falls, Peregrine Falls	Kendrick Lamar, Damn; Bruno Mars, 24K Magic; Ed Sheeran, ÷; Post Malone, Stoney; Taylor Swift, Reputation
Jazz Album of the Year – Solo	Jazz Album of the Year – Group
Mike Downes, Root Structure; Brad Cheeseman, The Tide Turns; Chet Doxas, Rich in Symbols; Hilario Durán, Contumbao; Ralph Bowen, Ralph Bowen	David Braid, Mike Murley, Anders Mogensen and Johnny Aman, The North; Andrew Downing's Otterville, Otterville; Carn Davidson 9, Murphy; Christine Jensen and Ingrid Jensen, Infinitude; Ernesto Cervini's Turboprop, Rev
Vocal Jazz Album of the Year	Metal/Hard Music Album of the Year
Diana Krall, Turn Up the Quiet; Bria Skonberg, With a Twist; Kellylee Evans, Come On; Matt Dusk, Old School Yule; Michael Kaeshammer, No Filter	Anciients, Voice of the Void; Archspire, Relentless Mutation; Longhouse, II: Vanishing; METZ, Strange Peace; Striker, Striker
Pop Album of the Year	Rock Album of the Year
Lights, Skin & Earth; Ria Mae, My Love; Ruth B, Save Haven; Scott Helman, Hôtel de Ville; ~~Hedley, Cageless~~ - nomination withdrawn	The Glorious Sons, Young Beauties and Fools; Big Wreck, Grace Street; Death from Above, Outrage! Is Now; Nickelback, Feed the Machine; Theory, Wake Up Call
Contemporary Roots Album of the Year	Traditional Roots Album of the Year
Bruce Cockburn, Bone on Bone; Amelia Curran, Watershed; Buffy Sainte-Marie, Medicine Songs; The Jerry Cans, Inuusiq; The Weather Station, The Weather Station	The Dead South, Illusion & Doubt; Cassie and Maggie, The Willow Collection; Còig, Rove; Jayme Stone, Jayme Stone's Folklife; The East Pointers, What We Leave Behind
World Music Album of the Year	Comedy Album of the Year
Kobo Town, Where the Galleon Sank; Autorickshaw, Meter; The Battle of Santiago, La Migra; Beny Esguerra and New Tradition, A New Tradition Vol. 2: Return of the KUISi; Briga, Femme	Ivan Decker, I Wanted to Be a Dinosaur; Charlie Demers, Fatherland; D.J. Demers, [Indistinct Chatter]; K. Trevor Wilson, Sorry! (A Canadian Album); Rebecca Kohler, In Living Kohler

=== Songs and recordings ===
Single of the Year	Classical Composition of the Year
Shawn Mendes, "There's Nothing Holdin' Me Back"; Arcade Fire, "Everything Now"; Arkells, "Knocking at the Door"; Alessia Cara, "How Far I'll Go"; The Weeknd, "I Feel It Coming"	Jocelyn Morlock, My Name is Amanda Todd; Alice Ping Yee Ho, Cœur à Cœur; Andrew Staniland, Phi, Caelestis; James Rolfe, Breathe; Vincent Ho, The Shaman
Dance Recording of the Year	R&B/Soul Recording of the Year
Nick Fiorucci feat. Laurell, "Closer"; DVBBS feat. Gia Koko and CMC$, "Not Going Home"; Felix Cartal, "Get What You Give"; KAPRI, "Deeper"; Sultan & Shepard (featuring Nadia Ali and IRO), "Almost Home"	Daniel Caesar, Freudian; Jahkoy, Foreign Water; Jessie Reyez, Kiddo; Jhyve, Human; Keshia Chanté, Unbound 01
Rap Recording of the Year	Reggae Recording of the Year
Tory Lanez, Shooters; Belly, Mumble Rap; Clairmont the Second, Lil Mont From the Ave; Lou Phelps, 001: Experiments; Maestro Fresh Wes, Coach Fresh	Kirk Diamond, "Greater"; Ammoye, The Light; Blessed, "Hold Up Slow Down"; Eyesus, "Neva Judge"; K'Coneil feat. Kreesha Turner, "Love How You Whine"

=== Other ===
Album Artwork of the Year	Video of the Year
Marianne Collins, Ian Ilavsky and Steve Farmer — Stubborn Persistent Illusions, Do Make Say Think; Catherine Lepage and Simon Rivest — Everything Now, Arcade Fire; Geneviève Lapointe and Martin Tremblay — Coconut Christmas, The Lost Fingers; Jean-Sébastien Denis, Ian Ilavsky and Guy L'Heureux — Mechanics of Dominion, Esmerine; Keaven Yazdani, Sean Brown and Éric Lachance — Freudian, Daniel Caesar	Claire Boucher — "Venus Fly", Grimes; Christopher Mills — "Leaving the Table", Leonard Cohen; Emma Higgins — "The Drugs", Mother Mother; Peter Huang — "Gatekeeper", Jessie Reyez; Shane Cunningham and Mark Myers — "Knocking at the Door", Arkells
