= Juno Awards of 2008 =

Canadian music awards ceremony

- Date: 5–6 April 2008
- Venue: Pengrowth Saddledome, Calgary, Alberta
- Hosted by: Russell Peters

Television/radio coverage
- Network: CTV

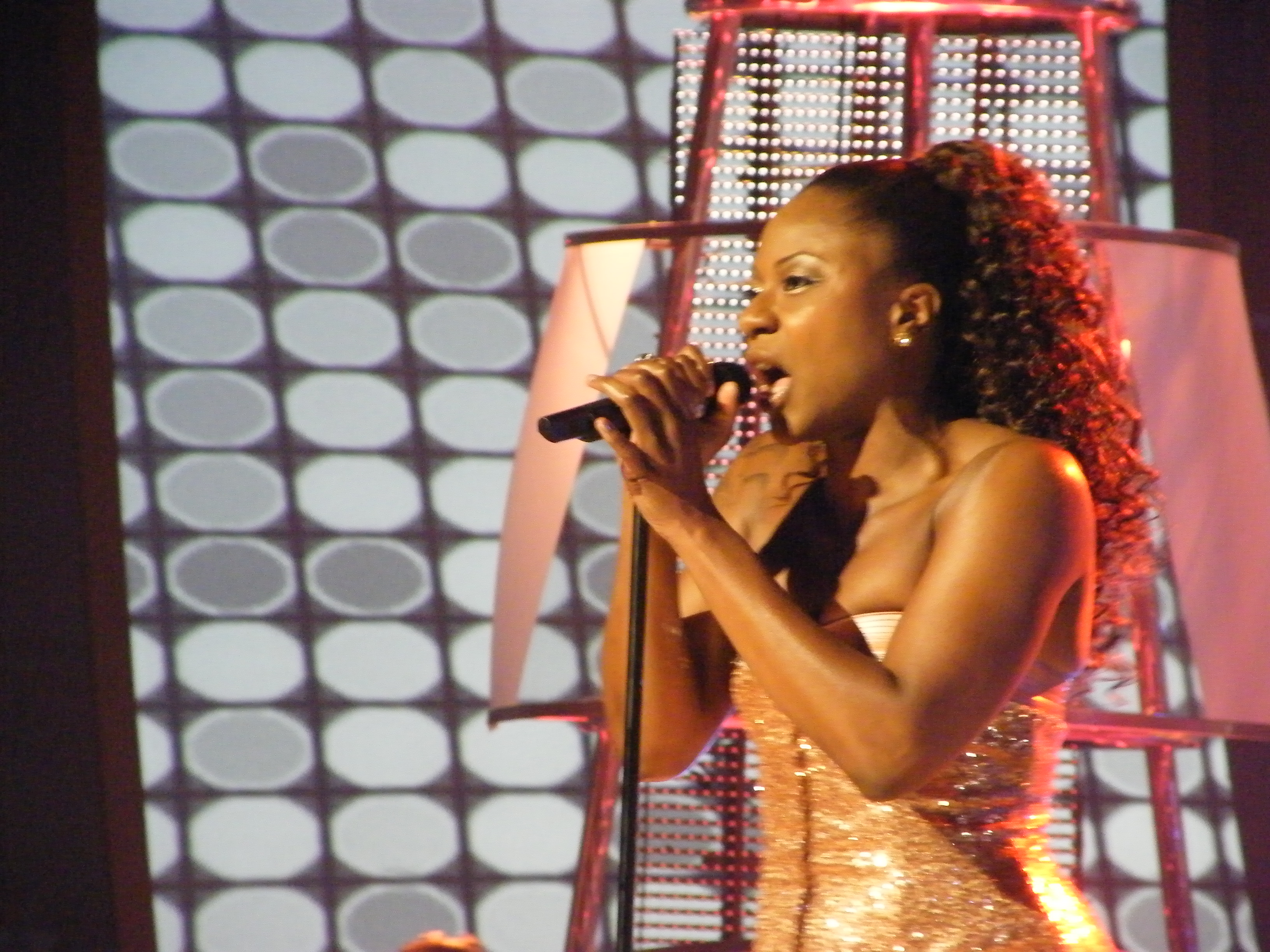
Jully Black at the 2008 Juno Awards in Calgary, Alberta.

The Juno Awards of 2008 were held in Calgary, Alberta, Canada on the weekend ending 6 April 2008. These ceremonies honoured music industry achievements in Canada in the latter part of 2006 and in most of 2007.

Country performer and multiple Juno Award winner Paul Brandt received the 2008 Humanitarian Award which is now named after CHUM-FM Radio founder, Allan Waters. Moses Znaimer, who led the development of Citytv and MuchMusic, received the Walt Grealis Special Achievement Award. Nominations for all remaining categories were announced on 5 February 2008.

Notable among winners was Feist, winning all five awards in her nominated categories, three of which were presented in the televised gala.

== Presentations ==
=== Saturday gala ===
The Saturday gala where most awards are presented occurred at the Telus Convention Centre on 5 April, while the major awards were presented at the Pengrowth Saddledome on Sunday (6 April).

=== Sunday televised ceremonies ===
Performers appearing on the program included Feist, Finger Eleven, Michael Bublé, Avril Lavigne, Anne Murray, Paul Brandt, Aaron Lines, Gord Bamford, Hedley, Johnny Reid, and Jully Black.

The televised event was broadcast on CTV and hosted by Russell Peters. Peters' monologue was described by Edmonton Sun columnist Bill Harris as "the funniest opening five minutes we've ever seen from an awards-show host." Peters was also cited by Toronto Star entertainment critic Ben Rayner as offering a break from recent years of "iffy emceeing" during the award broadcasts.

The 2008 broadcast attracted CTV's second-highest ratings since the network gained broadcast rights. 1.45 million viewers were measured in 2008 compared to 2.18 million for the 2003 ceremonies.

Jeff Healey, an internationally noted Canadian musician who died the month before the Juno ceremonies, was given a brief tribute mention by members of Blue Rodeo during the televised awards ceremony.

I've never actually seen the Juno Awards, to be honest with you, which I guess makes me Canadian.

— Russell Peters, Juno Awards host

== Nominees and winners ==
Nominees for the 2008 Juno Awards were announced on 5 February 2008. On 15 February 2008, CARAS indicated that it made a "logistical error" during its nominations voting process, announcing the addition of two new nominations and the replacement of one nomination as follows:

- Album of the Year: Anne Murray Duets: Friends & Legends, Anne Murray
- New Artist of the Year: Jill Barber
- Rap Recording of the Year: Memoirs of a Playbwoy, JDiggz; "Fall From Paradise" by Classified was disqualified because the song appeared on the album Hitch Hikin' Music which was previously nominated for the 2007 awards.

=== Artist of the Year ===
Winner: Feist

Other nominees:

- Michael Bublé
- Celine Dion
- Avril Lavigne
- Pascale Picard

=== Group of the Year ===
Winner: Blue Rodeo

Other nominees:

- Arcade Fire
- Finger Eleven
- Hedley
- Kaïn

=== New Artist of the Year ===
Winner: Serena Ryder

Other nominees:

- Jill Barber (nomination added on 15 February 2008)
- Belly
- Jeremy Fisher
- Justin Nozuka
- Suzie McNeil

=== New Group of the Year ===
Winner: Wintersleep

Other nominees:

- Dragonette
- Faber Drive
- illScarlett
- State of Shock

=== Jack Richardson Producer of the Year ===
Winner: Joni Mitchell, "Hana" and "Bad Dreams"

Other nominees:

- Kevin Churko, "I Don't Wanna Stop" and "God Bless the Almighty Dollar" (Ozzy Osbourne)
- Rhys Fulber, "Weak in the Knees" and "Just Another Day" (Serena Ryder)
- Bob Rock, "Everything" (Michael Bublé) and "Bomb" (Payola$)
- Skratch Bastid, "Way Back When" and "The Outskirts" (Buck 65)

=== Recording Engineer of the Year ===
Winner: Kevin Churko, Black Rain (Ozzy Osbourne)

Other nominees:

- John Bailey, Make Someone Happy (Sophie Milman)
- Richard Chycki, Snakes & Arrows (Rush) and Are You Listening? (Dolores O'Riordan)
- George Seara, Holly Cole (Holly Cole)
- Jeff Wolpert, Onward! (Manteca)

=== Songwriter of the Year ===
Winner: Feist, "My Moon My Man", "1234", "I Feel It All"

Other nominees:

- Daniel Bélanger, "La Fin de l'homme", "Television", "Sports et loisirs"
- Avril Lavigne, "Girlfriend", "Keep Holding On", "When You're Gone"
- Joel Plaskett, "Fashionable People", "Nothing More to Say", "Face of the Earth"
- Rufus Wainwright, "Going to a Town", "Release the Stars", "Do I Disappoint You"

=== Fan Choice Award ===
Winner: Michael Bublé

Other nominees:

- Celine Dion
- Claude Dubois
- Nelly Furtado
- Avril Lavigne

=== Nominated albums ===
==== Album of the Year ====
Winner: The Reminder, Feist

Other nominees:

- The Best Damn Thing, Avril Lavigne
- Call Me Irresponsible, Michael Bublé
- Anne Murray Duets: Friends & Legends, Anne Murray (nomination added on 15 February 2008)
- D'elles, Celine Dion
- Taking Chances, Celine Dion

==== Aboriginal Recording of the Year ====
Winner: The Dirty Looks, Derek Miller

Other nominees:

- Home and Native Land, Little Hawk
- Nikawiy Askiy, Sandy Scofield
- Phoenix], Fara Palmer
- What It Takes, Donny Parenteau

==== Adult Alternative Album of the Year ====
Winner: Small Miracles, Blue Rodeo

Other nominees:

- Chrome Dreams II, Neil Young
- Goodbye Blue Monday, Jeremy Fisher
- No Stranger, Tom Cochrane
- Release the Stars, Rufus Wainwright

==== Alternative Album of the Year ====
Winner: Neon Bible, Arcade Fire

Other nominees:

- Close to Paradise, Patrick Watson
- The Con, Tegan and Sara
- LP, Holy Fuck
- Welcome to the Night Sky, Wintersleep

==== Blues Album of the Year ====
Winner: Building Full of Blues, Fathead

Other nominees:

- Blues Thing, Jack de Keyzer
- High Country Blues, Harrison Kennedy
- Junction City, Little Miss Higgins
- A Lesson I've Learned, The Johnny Max Band

==== CD/DVD Artwork Design of the Year ====
Winner: Tracy Maurice and François Miron, Neon Bible (Arcade Fire)

Other nominees:

- Felix Wittholz, Situation (Buck 65)
- Jeff Harrison and Clinton Hussey, Ornamental Eterworld (Vonnegut Dollhouse)
- John Cook, Mark Burchner and Greg Bennet, Revue: The Best of Paul Reddick
- Mathieu Houde, Simon Rivest, Catherine Lepage, Mathieu Doyon, 2×2 (Pierre LaPointe)

==== Children's Album of the Year ====
Winner: Music Soup, Jen Gould

Other nominees:

- Gonna Keep Dancing, Eddie Douglas
- This is Daniel Cook: Here We Are, This is Daniel Cook
- Prokofiev: Peter and the Wolf, Windsor Symphony Orchestra
- Superstars, The Doodlebops

==== Contemporary Christian/Gospel Album of the Year ====
Winner: Holy God, Brian Doerksen

Other nominees:

- Beautiful, Amanda Falk
- Five Score and Seven Years Ago, Relient K
- Roots Revolution, Newworldson
- The Flame in All of Us, Thousand Foot Krutch

==== Classical Album of the Year (large ensemble) ====
Winner: Korngold, Barber & Walton Violin Concertos, James Ehnes, Bramwell Tovey, Vancouver Symphony Orchestra

Other nominees:

- Elgar Violin Concertos, James Ehnes, Andrew Davis and the Philharmonia Orchestra
- La Mer, Yannick Nézet-Séguin and the Orchestre Métropolitain
- Vivaldi: L’estro armonico, Tafelmusik Baroque Orchestra
- Water Music, Les Violons du Roy

==== Classical Album of the Year (solo or chamber ensemble) ====
Winner: Alkan Concerto for Solo Piano, Marc-André Hamelin

Other nominees:

- After Reading Shakespeare, Matt Haimovitz
- Bach Cello Suites, Jean-Guihen Queyras
- Rameau Keyboard Suites, Angela Hewitt
- Shostakovich: Complete Works for Piano Trio/Silvestrov: Postlude DSCH, The Gryphon Trio

==== Classical Album of the Year (vocal or choral performance) ====
Winner: Surprise, Measha Brueggergosman

Other nominees:

- Buxtehude – Membra Jesu Nostri, Les Voix Baroques
- Constantinople, The Gryphon Trio
- Samuel Barber Songs, Gerald Finley
- Schubert Among Friends, The Aldeburgh Connection

==== Francophone Album of the Year ====
Winner: L'Échec du matériel, Daniel Bélanger

Other nominees:

- D'elles, Céline Dion
- L'homme qui me ressemble, Damien Robitaille
- De retour à la source, Isabelle Boulay
- Vers à soi, Jorane

==== Instrumental Album of the Year ====
Winner: The Utmost, Jayme Stone

Other nominees:

- Foley Room, Amon Tobin
- Jalopy, Joey Wright
- Kensington Suite, Richard Underhill
- Snake Road, Bob Lanois

==== International Album of the Year ====
Winner: Good Girl Gone Bad, Rihanna

Other nominees:

- The Dutchess, Fergie
- Lost Highway, Bon Jovi
- Noël, Josh Groban
- Timbaland Presents Shock Value, Timbaland

==== Contemporary Jazz Album of the Year ====
Winner: Almost Certainly Dreaming, The Chris Tarry Group

Other nominees:

- Chasing After Light, Michael Occhipinti and Creation Dream
- Forty Revolutions, David Occhipinti
- Metaphora, Altered Laws
- Onward!, Manteca

==== Traditional Jazz Album of the Year ====
Winner: Debut, Brandi Disterheft

Other nominees:

- Brubeck Braid: twotet/deuxtet, David Braid, Matt Brubeck
- Code Breaking, Tara Davidson
- Foundations, Jodi Proznick Quartet
- Live Jazz Legends, Oliver Jones, PJ Perry, Ian MacDougall, Terry Clarke, Michel Donato

==== Vocal Jazz Album of the Year ====
Winner: Make Someone Happy, Sophie Milman

Other nominees:

- The Very Thought of You, Emilie-Claire Barlow
- Destination Moon, Deborah Cox
- Holly Cole, Holly Cole
- Days Like These, Michael Kaeshammer

==== Pop Album of the Year ====
Winner: The Reminder, Feist

Other nominees:

- Call Me Irresponsible, Michael Bublé
- Anne Murray Duets: Friends & Legends, Anne Murray
- Street Gospels, Bedouin Soundclash
- Taking Chances, Celine Dion

==== Rock Album of the Year ====
Winner: Them vs. You vs. Me, Finger Eleven

Other nominees:

- Hospital Music, Matthew Good
- The Lucky Ones, Pride Tiger
- The Saint Alvia Cartel, The Saint Alvia Cartel
- Underclass Hero, Sum 41

==== Roots and Traditional Album of the Year (Solo) ====
Winner: Right of Passage, David Francey

Other nominees:

- The Devil on a Bench in Stanley Park, Justin Rutledge
- For All Time, Jill Barber
- Horse Soldier! Horse Soldier!, Corb Lund
- Short Stories, Oh Susanna

==== Roots and Traditional Album of the Year (Group) ====
Winner: Key Principles, Nathan

Other nominees:

- ¿Buddy, Where You Been?, Compadres: James Keelaghan and Oscar Lopez
- In Good We Trust, Harry Manx and Kevin Breit
- New Seasons, The Sadies
- Stellar Jays, John Reischman and The Jaybirds

==== World Music Album of the Year ====
Winner: Agua Del Pozo, Alex Cuba

Other nominees:

- Frontiers, Jesse Cook
- Jogo da Vida, Celso Machado
- So the Journey Goes, Autorickshaw
- Wanderlust, Kiran Ahluwalia

=== Nominated releases ===
==== Single of the Year ====
Winner: "1234", Feist

Other nominees:

- "Everything", Michael Bublé
- "Girlfriend", Avril Lavigne
- "Paralyzer", Finger Eleven
- "Seven Day Fool", Jully Black

==== Classical Composition of the Year ====
Winner: "Constantinople", Christos Hatzis

Other nominees:

- "A Child’s Cry From Izieu", Oskar Morawetz
- "Letters From Mignon", R. Murray Schafer
- "Quantum Mechanics", Jeffrey Ryan
- "This Isn’t Silence", Brian Current

==== Country Recording of the Year ====
Winner: Risk, Paul Brandt

Other nominees:

- Honkytonks and Heartaches, Gord Bamford
- Kicking Stones, Johnny Reid
- Life Is Calling My Name, Shane Yellowbird
- Moments That Matter, Aaron Lines

==== Dance Recording of the Year ====
Winner: All U Ever Want, Billy Newton-Davis vs. Deadmau5

Other nominees:

- After Hours, Melleefresh vs. Deadmau5
- Every Time You Move, Nick Fiorucci
- Fancy Footwork, Chromeo
- Poppin' Beats, Hatiras

==== Music DVD of the Year ====
Winner: 666 Live, Billy Talent

Other nominees:

- Danny Michel and The Black Tornados, Danny Michel
- One Night at the Metropolis, Jesse Cook
- Nights from the Alhambra, Loreena McKennitt
- Trinity Revisited, Cowboy Junkies

==== R&B/Soul Recording of the Year ====
Winner: Revival, Jully Black

Other nominees:

- The Birth of Cornelius, Corneille
- Goldrush, Ebrahim
- 2U, Keshia Chanté
- We Can All Be Free, God Made Me Funky

==== Rap Recording of the Year ====
Winner: The Revolution, Belly

Other nominees:

- The Fewturistic, BrassMunk
- Memoirs of a Playbwoy, JDiggz
- Port Authority, Marco Polo
- The Old Prince, Shad

==== Reggae Recording of the Year ====
Winner: "Don't Go Pretending", Mikey Dangerous

Other nominees:

- "Don't Go", Korexion
- "Final Road", Blessed
- "Music is my Life", Tanya Mullings
- "Two Chord Skankin'", Lyndon John X

=== Video of the Year ===
Winner: Christopher Mills, "C’mon" (Blue Rodeo)

Other nominees:

- Kyle Davison, "Shake Tramp" (Marianas Trench)
- Vincent Morriset, "Neon Bible" (Arcade Fire)
- Marc Ricciardelli, "Walls Fall Down" (Bedouin Soundclash)
- Sean Wainsteim, "Cheer It On" (Tokyo Police Club)

== Compilation CD ==
A compilation album was released in February 2008

1. My Moon My Man – Feist
2. For The Nights I Can't Remember – Hedley
3. Girlfriend (radio edit) – Avril Lavigne
4. Nothing Special – IllScarlett
5. I Get Around – Dragonette
6. Paralyzer (clean version) – Finger Eleven
7. Tongue Tied – Faber Drive
8. Gate 22 – Pascale Picard
9. Everything – Michael Bublé
10. After Tonight – Justin Nozuka
11. Weak in the Knees – Serena Ryder
12. Born Losers – Matthew Good
13. Weighty Ghost – Wintersleep
14. This Town – Blue Rodeo
15. Walls Fall Down – Bedouin Soundclash
16. Pressure (radio edit) – Belly feat. Ginuwine
17. Seven Day Fool – Jully Black
18. Day Dream Believer – Anne Murray & Nelly Furtado
19. Didn't Even See The Dust – Paul Brandt
20. Dirty Old Man – Neil Young
21. Le Bonheur Au Large – Kaïn
