= Juno Awards of 2000 =

Edition of Canadian music award

- Date: March 11–12, 2000
- Venue: SkyDome, Toronto, Canada
- Hosted by: The Moffatts

Television/radio coverage
- Network: CBC

The Juno Awards of 2000 were held in Toronto, Canada, during the weekend of March 11–12, 2000.

The primary ceremonies were hosted by the family group the Moffatts at the SkyDome (now Rogers Centre), on March 12, 2000, and broadcast on CBC Television. This marked the first year that the award ceremonies were divided over two days, with non-televised award categories presented on March 11.

The following award categories were nationally televised:

- Best Female Artist
- Best Male Artist
- Best Country Male Vocalist
- Best Group
- Best New Group
- Best Songwriter
- Best Album
- Best Selling Album (Foreign or Domestic)
- Best Vocal Jazz Album
- Canadian Music Hall of Fame

A new design for the Juno Award statuettes was created by artist Shirley Elford and introduced at this year's ceremony.

Nominations were announced February 2, 2000, in Toronto, at the Glenn Gould Studio. Alanis Morissette received five nominations, including one as director for Best Video.

== Nominees and winners ==
=== Best Female Artist ===
Winner: Chantal Kreviazuk

Other nominees:

- Celine Dion
- Lynda Lemay
- Amanda Marshall
- Alanis Morissette

=== Best Male Artist ===
Winner: Bryan Adams

Other nominees:

- Paul Brandt
- Choclair
- Tom Cochrane
- Edwin

=== Best New Solo Artist ===
Winner: Tal Bachman

Other nominees:

- Tory Cassis
- Tara Lyn Hart
- Jorane
- Ivana Santilli

=== Best Group ===
Winner: Matthew Good Band

Other nominees:

- La Chicane
- Moist
- Our Lady Peace
- The Tea Party

=== Best New Group ===
Winner: Sky

Other nominees:

- Gob
- Len
- Prozzäk
- Serial Joe

=== Best Songwriter ===
Winner: Shania Twain (co-songwriter Robert John "Mutt" Lange), "Man! I Feel Like a Woman!", "That Don't Impress Me Much", "You've Got a Way"

Other nominees:

- Tal Bachman, "If You Sleep", "She's So High"
- Bruce Cockburn, "Last Night of the World", "Mango", "Pacing the Cage"
- Amanda Marshall, "Believe in You" and "If I Didn't Have You" (co-writer Eric Bazilian); "Love Lift Me" (co-writers Eric Bazilian, Randy Cantor, John Bettis)
- Alanis Morissette, "So Pure", "Thank U", "Unsent"

=== Best Country Female Vocalist ===
Winner: Shania Twain

Other nominees:

- Lisa Brokop
- Terri Clark
- Patricia Conroy
- Tara Lyn Hart

=== Best Country Male Vocalist ===
Winner: Paul Brandt

Other nominees:

- Julian Austin
- John Landry
- Jamie Warren
- Jim Witter

=== Best Country Group or Duo ===
Winner: The Rankins

Other nominees:

- Farmer's Daughter
- Lace
- Prairie Oyster
- The Wilkinsons

=== International Achievement Award ===
Winner: Sarah McLachlan

=== Best Producer ===
Winner: Tal Bachman and Bob Rock, "She's So High" and "If You Sleep" by Tal Bachman

Other nominees:

- Arnold Lanni, "One Man Army" and "Is Anybody Home?" by Our Lady Peace
- Jeff Martin, "Heaven Coming Down" and "The Messenger" by the Tea Party
- Greg Wells, "Keep a Lid on Things" and "Get You in the Morning" by Crash Test Dummies
- Michael Phillip Wojewoda, "Puzzle Girl" and "You & Me" by Kim Stockwood

=== Best Recording Engineer ===
Winner: Paul Northfield and Jagori Tanna, "Summertime in the Void" and "When Did You Get Back from Mars?" by I Mother Earth

Other nominees:

- Michael Banton-Jones, "Halfway to Heaven" by David Leask
- Richard Benoit, "Slow Bombing the World" by Marc Jordan
- Lenny DeRose, "Sucks to Be You" by Prozzäk, "Supersex 69" by the Philosopher Kings
- John Whynot and Colin Linden, "Last Night of the World" by Bruce Cockburn, "Lean on Your Peers" by Blackie and the Rodeo Kings

=== Canadian Music Hall of Fame ===
Winner: Bruce Fairbairn

=== Walt Grealis Special Achievement Award ===
Winner: Emile Berliner

== Nominated and winning albums ==
=== Best Album ===
Winner: Alanis Morissette – Supposed Former Infatuation Junkie

Other nominees:

- Hot Show– Prozzäk
- On a Day Like Today – Bryan Adams
- These Are Special Times – Celine Dion
- Tuesday's Child – Amanda Marshall

=== Best Blues Album ===
Winner: Gust of Wind – Ray Bonneville

Other nominees:

- Blues Party – Chris Whiteley
- Call It What You Will – Steve Hill
- Down in the Groove – Jack de Keyzer
- Michael Jerome Browne – Michael Jerome Browne

=== Best Children's Album ===
Winner: Skinnamarink TV – Sharon, Lois and Bram

Other nominees:

- Ants in Your Pants, Volume 1 – Douglas John
- Les Petites Merveiles de Fanchon – Fanchon
- Play On... – Jam Sandwich
- Song of the Unicorn – Susan Hammond's Classical Kids

=== Best Classical Album (Solo or Chamber Ensemble) ===
Winner: Schumann: String Quartets – St. Lawrence String Quartet

Other nominees:

- Bach: Well-Tempered Clavier, Book 2 – Angela Hewitt
- For the End of Time – Leila Josefowicz
- Naida Cole – Naida Cole
- Rzewiski: The People United Will Never Be Defeated! – Marc-Andre Hamelin

=== Best Classical Album (Large Ensemble) ===
Winner: Respighi: La Boutique Fantasque – Montreal Symphony Orchestra

Other nominees:

- Brahms: Two Piano Concertos – Anton Kuerti, Orchestre Métropolitain
- Handel: Arias and Dances – Excerpts from Agrippina and Alcina – Tafelmusik, Karina Gauvin
- Nights in the Gardens of Spain – Angela Cheng, Hans Graf, Calgary Philharmonic Orchestra
- Vivaldi: Concerti for Strings – Les Violons du Roy

=== Best Classical Album (Vocal or Choral Performance) ===
Winner: German Romantic Opera – Ben Heppner

Other nominees:

- Ae Fond Kiss – Edith Wiens, Rudolph Jansen, Judy Loman
- Bach: Arias & Oboe d'Amore – Daniel Taylor
- Heavenly Spheres – Studio de musique ancienne de Montréal
- Images de Noel – Karina Gauvin, Michael McMahon, Nora Shulman

=== Best Album Design ===
Winner: Michael Wrycraft (creative director) – Radio Fusebox by Andy Stochansky

Other nominees:

- Garnet Armstrong, Mark Bartkiw, Amo3ba Corp, Margaret Malandruccolo – Blue Green Orange by I Mother Earth
- Tom Chaggaris, Eve Egoyan, Johnnie Eisen – Thetihingsinbeteween by Eve Egoyan
- Anouk Lessard, Sebastien Toupin – Vent Fou by Jorane
- Catherine Stockhausen, Lee Towndrow – Between the Bridges by Sloan

=== Best Gospel Album ===
Winner: Legacy of Hope – Deborah Klassen

Other nominees:

- God Only Knows – the LaPointes
- Sheryl Stacey – Sheryl Stacey
- Sinner and the Saint – Jon Buller
- Sweetsalt – Sweetsalt

=== Best Instrumental Album ===
Winner: In My Hands – Natalie MacMaster

Other nominees:

- Natural Sleep Inducement – David Bradstreet, Dan Gibson
- Piano Cascades – John Herberman, Dan Gibson
- The Piper's Legacy – Rob Crabtree, Oliver Schroer
- Utopia – Robert Michaels

=== Best Selling Album (Foreign or Domestic) ===
Winner: Millennium – Backstreet Boys

Other nominees:

- Americana – the Offspring
- ...Baby One More Time – Britney Spears
- Ricky Martin – Ricky Martin
- These Are Special Times – Celine Dion

=== Best Traditional Jazz Album – Instrumental ===
Winner: Deep in a Dream – Pat LaBarbera

Other nominees:

- Art & Soul – Renee Rosnes
- New Horizons – Bernie Senensky Quintet
- P.J. Perry & the Edmonton Symphony Orchestra – P.J. Perry
- Time Warp Plays the Music of Duke Ellington – Time Warp

=== Best Contemporary Jazz Album – Instrumental ===
Winner: ...so far – D.D. Jackson

Other nominees:

- Blue Jade – Joe Sealy and Paul Novotny
- The Field – Jeff Johnston
- Freeflight – Bob Shaw and Freeflight
- Puzzle City – Jean-Pierre Zanella

=== Best Vocal Jazz Album ===
Winner: When I Look in Your Eyes – Diana Krall

Other nominees:

- How My Heart Sings – Kate Hammett-Vaughan
- I've Got Your Number – Jeri Brown
- Swing Ladies, Swing! – Carol Welsman
- There's Beauty in the Rain – Karin Plato

=== Best Roots or Traditional Album – Group ===
Winner: Kings of Love – Blackie and the Rodeo Kings

Other nominees:

- Encore! – Barachois
- The Road to Canso – Scruj MacDuhk
- Turn – Great Big Sea
- Xième – La Bottine Souriante

=== Best Roots or Traditional Album – Solo ===
Winner: Breakfast in New Orleans, Dinner in Timbuktu – Bruce Cockburn

Other nominees:

- Gentleman of Leisure – Jesse Winchester
- In My Hands – Natalie MacMaster
- Lan Duil – Mary Jane Lamond
- Whereabouts – Ron Sexsmith

=== Best Alternative Album ===
Winner: Julie Doiron and the Wooden Stars – Julie Doiron and Wooden Stars

Other nominees:

- Clayton Park – Thrush Hermit
- My Love Is Bold – Danko Jones
- Sometimes I Cry – Tricky Woo
- You Can't Stop the Bum Rush – Len

=== Best Selling Francophone Album ===
Winner: En Catimini – La Chicane

Other nominees:

- D'Autres rives – Bruno Pelletier
- Les Fourmis – Jean Leloup
- Live – Lynda Lemay
- Notre-Dame de Paris – various artists

=== Best Pop/Adult Album ===
Winner: Colour Moving and Still – Chantal Kreviazuk

Other nominees:

- On a Day Like Today – Bryan Adams
- Supposed Former Infatuation Junkie – Alanis Morissette
- Tal Bachman – Tal Bachman
- Taming the Tiger – Joni Mitchell

=== Best Rock Album ===
Winner: Beautiful Midnight – Matthew Good Band

Other nominees:

- Another Spin Around the Sun – Edwin
- Happiness...Is Not a Fish That You Can Catch – Our Lady Peace
- Mercedes 5 and Dime – Moist
- Triptych – The Tea Party

== Nominated and winning releases ==
=== Best Single ===
Winner: "Bobcaygeon" – The Tragically Hip

Other nominees:

- "Heaven Coming Down" – The Tea Party
- "Hello Time Bomb" – Matthew Good Band
- "Steal My Sunshine" – Len
- "Sucks to Be You" – Prozzäk

=== Best Classical Composition ===
Winner: Shattered Night, Shivering Stars – Alexina Louie

Other nominees:

- Arc – Alexina Louie
- String Quartet No. 1 – Glenn Buhr
- The Book of Mirrors – Gary Kulesha
- Winter Poems – Glenn Buhr

=== Best Rap Recording ===
Winner: Ice Cold – Choclair

Other nominees:

- Deliverance – Citizen Kane
- Global Warning – Rascalz
- Money or Love – Saukrates
- Don't Wanna Be Your Slave – Michie Mee with Esthero

=== Best R&B/Soul Recording ===
Winner: Thinkin' About You – 2Rude featuring Snow, Smoothe tha Hustler, Latoya & Miranda

Other nominees:

- All My Love – Michael Clarke
- Brown – Ivana Santilli
- Nodeja – Nodeja
- Tha Crab Theory – Blacklisted featuring ORA, Taj and Deslisha Thomas

=== Best Music of Aboriginal Canada Recording ===
Winner: Falling Down – Chester Knight and the Wind

Other nominees:

- Love that Strong – Elizabeth Hill
- To Bring Back Yesterday – Fara Palmer
- Touch the Earth and Sky – Vern Cheechoo
- World Hand Drum Champions '98 – Red Bull

=== Best Reggae Recording ===
Winner: Heart & Soul – Lazo

Other nominees:

- Hard End – The Luge Sessions
- Sometimes – Choices
- Thanks and Devotion – Willi Williams
- What If I Told You – Andru Branch

=== Best Global Album ===
Winner: Omnisource – Madagascar Slim

Other nominees:

- Bambatulu – Lilison Di Kinara
- Entente Cordiale – Show-Do-Man
- Firedance – Toronto Tabla Ensemble
- Jongo Le – Celso Machado

=== Best Dance Recording ===
Winner: "Silence" – Delerium

Other nominees:

- "Arriba" – Joee
- "Dancing in the Key of Love" – Temperance
- "Over and Over" – Emjay
- "The Rush Won't Stop" – Steve Austin

=== Best Video ===
Winner: Alanis Morissette, "So Pure" by Alanis Morissette

Other nominees:

- Ulf Buddensieck, "Underground" by Moist
- Marc Lostracco, "Strange Disease" by Prozzäk
- Andrew MacNaughtan, "On the Scene" by Big Sugar
- William Morrison, "Hello Time Bomb" by Matthew Good Band
