= Juno Award for Classical Album of the Year – Vocal or Choral Performance =

Canadian music award

The Juno Award for "Classical Album of the Year" has been awarded since 1994, as recognition each year for the best vocal classical music album in Canada.

== Winners ==
=== Best Classical Album (Vocal or Choral Performance) (1994 - 2002) ===
- 1994 - Claudette Leblanc (soprano), Valerie Tryon (piano), Debussy Songs
- 1995 - Vocal Soloists/Choeur et Orchestre symphonique de Montreal, Charles Dutoit - Conductor, Berlioz: Les Troyens
- 1996 - Ben Heppner (tenor), The Toronto Symphony Orchestra, Andrew Davis - Conductor, Ben Heppner Sings Richard Strauss
- 1997 - Choeur et orchestre symphonique de Montréal, Charles Dutoit - Conductor, Berlioz: La Damnation de Faust
- 1998 - Michael Schade (tenor), Russell Braun (baritone), Canadian Opera Company Orchestra, Richard Bradshaw, Soirée française
- 1999 - Gerald Finley (baritone), Stephen Ralls (piano), Songs of Travel
- 2000 - Ben Heppner, German Romantic Opera
- 2001 - Karina Gauvin; Russell Braun; Les Violons du Roy, G. F. Handel: Apollo e Dafne & Silete Venti
- 2002 - Ben Heppner, Air Français

=== Classical Album of the Year: Vocal or Choral Performance (2003 - 2021) ===
- 2003 - Les Violons du Roy, Mozart Requiem
- 2004 - Isabel Bayrakdarian, James Parker, Cello Ensemble, Azulão
- 2005 - Isabel Bayrakdarian, Tafelmusik Baroque Orchestra, Cleopatra
- 2006 - Isabel Bayrakdarian, Serouj Kradjian, Viardot-Garcia: Lieder Chansons Canzoni Mazurkas
- 2007 - Isabel Bayrakdarian, Russell Braun, Michael Schade, Mozart: Arie e Duetti
- 2008 - Measha Brueggergosman, Surprise
- 2009 - Ensemble Caprice, Gloria! Vivaldi’s Angels
- 2010 - Adrianne Pieczonka, Adrianne Pieczonka sings Puccini
- 2011 - Gerald Finley, Great Operatic Arias
- 2012 - Jane Archibald, Orchestre Symphonique Bienne, (Thomas Rösner, conductor), Haydn Arias
- 2013 - Karina Gauvin, Prima Donna
- 2014 - Marie-Nicole Lemieux & André Gagnon, Lettres de Madame Roy à sa fille Gabrielle
- 2015 - Gerald Finley & Julius Drake, Schubert: Winterreise
- 2016 - L'Harmonie des Saisons, Las Ciudades de Oro
- 2017 - Montreal Symphony Orchestra with Kent Nagano, L’Aiglon
- 2018 - Barbara Hannigan with Ludwig Orchestra, Crazy Girl Crazy
- 2019 - Barbara Hannigan with Reinbert de Leeuw, Vienna: Fin de siècle
- 2020 - Ottawa Bach Choir conducted by Lisette Canton, Handel: Dixit Dominus; Bach & Schutz: Motets
- 2021 - Toronto Mendelssohn Choir with Toronto Symphony Orchestra conducted by Sir Andrew Davis, Massenet: Thaïs, Erin Wall, Joshua Hopkins, Andrew Staples
