= Dubmatix =

Canadian reggae musician

Dubmatix is a Canadian reggae and electronic music artist and producer based in Toronto, Ontario. He has won a number of Juno Awards.

== Early life ==
Dubmatix was born Jesse E. King. He is the son of jazz keyboardist Bill King. He played drums as a child, studied guitar and piano, and played bass in his high school orchestra.

== Career ==
King took on the name Dubmatix and began performing and recording electronic and reggae music. By 2004 he had released an album of electronic dub music, and a remix, "Jen-ee-rocka". In 2007 he released a second album, Atomic Subsonic,

The Dubmatix album Gonna Be Alright, with Prince Blanco, was named Juno Award for Reggae Recording of the Year at the 2010 Juno Awards. Shortly after, he released an album, System Shakedown, which appeared on the !Earshot National Top 50 Chart in late 2010.

His album Seeds of Love and Life was nominated as Reggae Recording of the Year at the 2012 Juno Awards.

Dubmatix contributed a track to Jay Douglas' Lovers Paradise album. In 2018 he collaborated with Sly & Robbie to record a CD, Overdubbed, which was released through the Echo Beach label. At the Juno Awards of 2019, Overdubbed won the [Juno Award for Reggae Recording of the Year.
