= Juno Awards of 2005 =

Canadian music awards ceremony

- Date: 3 April 2005
- Venue: MTS Centre, Winnipeg, Manitoba
- Hosted by: Brent Butt

Television/radio coverage
- Network: CTV

The Juno Awards of 2005 were held 3 April at the MTS Centre in Winnipeg, Manitoba and were hosted by comedian Brent Butt. Avril Lavigne and k-os won three awards each, while Billy Talent and Feist won 2 apiece.

Nominations were announced 7 February 2005.

The Tragically Hip were this year's Canadian Music Hall of Fame recipient. Dan Aykroyd was originally scheduled to present this honour, but inexplicably cancelled several days before the awards ceremony. Sarah Harmer presented the Hall of Fame award in his place. Both Aykroyd and Harmer have ties to the Kingston, Ontario community in which The Tragically Hip are based.

Neil Young was scheduled to appear at these awards, based on a promise that he would attend if the ceremonies were held in Winnipeg. But the 1982 Canadian Music Hall of Fame inductee cancelled his appearance shortly before the Juno ceremonies following surgery to correct a brain aneurysm.

Other Juno Weekend events included the JunoFest concert series held at venues around the city, the Songwriters’ Circle on Sunday afternoon, and the Juno Fan Fare autograph session with Keshia Chanté, Great Big Sea, Kardinal Offishall, The Tea Party, Thornley, and other Canadian bands and artists.

The following awards were presented during the primary ceremonies, with other categories awarded at a non-televised ceremony the previous night:

- Group of the Year
- New Artist of the Year
- Juno Fan Choice Award
- Songwriter of the Year
- Album of the Year
- Adult Alternative Album of the Year
- Rap Recording of the Year
- Single of the Year

== Nominees and winners ==
=== Artist of the Year ===
Winner: Avril Lavigne

Other Nominees:

- Bryan Adams
- Celine Dion
- Diana Krall
- k.d. lang

=== New Artist of the Year ===
Winner: Feist

Other Nominees:

- Keshia Chanté
- Fefe Dobson
- Matt Dusk
- Matt Mays

=== Group of the Year ===
Winner: Billy Talent

Other Nominees:

- Great Big Sea
- Simple Plan
- Sum 41
- The Tragically Hip

=== Juno Fan Choice Award ===
Winner: Avril Lavigne

Other Nominees:

- Diana Krall
- Sarah McLachlan
- Marie-Elaine Thibert
- Shania Twain

=== New Group of the Year ===
Winner: Alexisonfire

Other Nominees:

- Death from Above 1979
- The Marble Index
- Thornley
- The Waking Eyes

=== Songwriter of the Year ===
Winner: Ron Sexsmith, "Whatever It Takes", "Not About to Lose", "Hard Bargain"

Other Nominees:

- Buck 65 "Wicked and Weird", "463", "Sore" (all co-written with T.O.A.B. La Rone)
- Marc Jordan, "Let's Waste Some Time" and "Shot Down My Heart" (both co-written by Steve MacKinnon), "Tears of Hercules" (co-written by Stephan Moccio)
- Avril Lavigne, "Don't Tell Me" (co-written by Evan Taubenfeld), "My Happy Ending" (co-written by Butch Walker), "Nobody's Home" (co-written by Ben Moody)
- Gordie Sampson, "Sunburn" and "Paris" (both co-written by Blair Daly and Troy Verges), "You (Or Somebody Like You)"

=== Jack Richardson Producer of the Year ===
Winner: Bob Rock, "Welcome to My Life" by Simple Plan and "Some Kind of Monster" by Metallica

Other Nominees:

- David Foster, "You Raise Me Up" by Josh Groban, "Can't Help Falling in Love" by Michael Bublé
- Raine Maida, "How Does it Feel" and "Fall to Pieces" by Avril Lavigne
- Nickelback and Joey Moi, "Someday" and "Figured You Out" by Nickelback
- Track & Field and Nelly Furtado, "Try" and "Explode" by Nelly Furtado

=== Recording Engineer of the Year ===
Winner: L. Stu Young, "What Do You Want" and "Man in Your Life" by Prince, Musicology

Other Nominees:

- Vic Florencia, "Shot Down My Heart" and "When Rita Takes the 'A' Train" by Marc Jordan, Make Believe Ballroom
- John MacLean, Sheldon Zaharko, "Jumbo Jet Headache" by Limblifter, I/O
- Peter Prilesnik, "Lucky Me" and "Day One" by Sarah Slean, Day One
- Bob Rock, "Welcome to My Life" and "Me Against the World" by Simple Plan, Still Not Getting Any

=== Canadian Music Hall of Fame ===
Winner: The Tragically Hip

=== Walt Grealis Special Achievement Award ===
Winner: Allan Slaight

== Nominated and winning albums ==
=== Album of the Year ===
Winner: Billy Talent, Billy Talent

Other Nominees:

- The Girl in the Other Room, Diana Krall
- Miracle, Celine Dion
- Still Not Getting Any, Simple Plan
- Under My Skin, Avril Lavigne

=== Adult Alternative Album of the Year ===
Winner: All of Our Names, Sarah Harmer

Other Nominees:

- Day One, Sarah Slean
- Matt Mays, Matt Mays
- Retriever, Ron Sexsmith
- Want Two, Rufus Wainwright

=== Alternative Album of the Year ===
Winner: Let It Die, Feist

Other Nominees:

- Funeral, Arcade Fire
- Now, More Than Ever, Jim Guthrie
- Set Yourself on Fire, Stars
- The Slow Wonder, A.C. Newman

=== Best Blues album ===
Winner: I'm Just A Man, Garrett Mason

Other Nominees:

- Come On In, Downchild
- Fresh Horses, Jim Byrnes
- No One to Blame, Rita Chiarelli
- Soap Bars and Dog Ears, The Jimmy Bowskill Band

=== Children's Album of the Year ===
Winner: A Poodle in Paris, Connie Kaldor

Other Nominees:

- Angela May's Magnificent Musical Menagerie, Angela Kelman
- The 5 Elements, Rick Scott and Harry Wong
- MathJam K, Judy & David
- Songs for You, Jennifer Gasoi

=== Classical Album of the Year (Solo or Chamber Ensemble) ===
Winner: Bach: The English Suites, Angela Hewitt

Other nominees:

- Drumtalker, Nexus
- Dvořák, Janáček, Smetana: Romantic Pieces, James Ehnes, Eduard Laurel
- Nikolai Kapustin Piano Music, Marc-Andre Hamelin
- Takemitsu: Toward the Sea, Robert Aitken, New Music Concerts Ensemble

=== Classical Album of the Year (Large Ensemble or Soloist(s) with Large Ensemble Accompaniment) ===
Winner: Dardanus/Le temple de la Gloire: Music of Jean-Philippe Rameau, Jeanne Lamon, Tafelmusik Baroque Orchestra

Other nominees:

- Borodin, Bramwell Tovey, Vancouver Symphony Orchestra
- Frenergy: Music of John Estacio, Mario Bernardi, Edmonton Symphony Orchestra
- Hummel, James Ehnes, London Mozart Players
- Mahler: Symphony No. 4, Yannick Nézet-Séguin, Orchestre Metropolitain du Grand Montreal

=== Classical Album of the Year (Vocal or Choral Performance) ===
Winner: Cleopatra, Isabel Bayrakdarian, Tafelmusik Baroque Orchestra

Other nominees:

- Bach: Psaume 51, Cantate 82, Karina Gauvin, Daniel Taylor, Violons du Roy
- Brahms Lieder, Marie-Nicole Lemieux
- Italian Oratorios, Matthew White, Tafelmusik Baroque Orchestra
- So Much to Tell, Measha Brueggergosman, Manitoba Chamber Orchestra

=== Best Album Design ===
Winner: Vincent Marcone, It Dreams by Jakalope

Other nominees:

- Tracy Maurice, N. Hilary Treadwell, Funeral by Arcade Fire
- Bryan Adams, Dirk Rudolf, Room Service by Bryan Adams
- John Rummen, Kim Kinakin, James Michin III, Under My Skin by Avril Lavigne
- Jesse F. Keeler, Eva Michon, You're a Woman, I'm a Machine by Death from Above 1979

=== Contemporary Christian/Gospel Album of the Year ===
Winner: Here to Stay, Greg Sczebel

Other nominees:

- Red Letterz, Fresh I.E.
- Living Water, Aileen Lombardo
- Phenomenon, Thousand Foot Krutch
- Taken, Raylene Scarrott

=== Country Recording of the Year ===
Winner: One Good Friend, George Canyon

Other nominees:

- Dress Rehearsal, Carolyn Dawn Johnson
- "Girls Lie Too", Terri Clark
- "Party for Two", Shania Twain and Billy Currington
- This Time Around, Paul Brandt

=== Best Selling Francophone album ===
Winner: Marie-Élaine Thibert, Marie-Élaine Thibert

Other nominees:

- Audrey, Audrey de Montigny
- Écoute-moi donc, Dany Bédar
- Gros Mammouth Album Turbo, Les Trois Accords
- J't'aime tout court, Nicola Ciccone

=== Instrumental Album of the Year ===
Winner: Mi Destino/My Destiny, Oscar Lopez

Other nominees:

- Celtic Reverie, Loretto Reid and Dan Gibson
- Mediterranean Nights, Vehkavaara & Piltch
- Rest & Relaxation, Montgomery Smith
- A Warrior's Journey, Longhouse

=== International Album of the Year ===
Winner: American Idiot, Green Day

Other nominees:

- Confessions, Usher
- Encore, Eminem
- Feels Like Home, Norah Jones
- How to Dismantle an Atomic Bomb, U2

=== Traditional Jazz Album of the Year ===
Winner: Vivid: The David Braid Sextet Live, David Braid

Other nominees:

- Deep Cove, Ryga/Rosnes Quartet
- Elenar, François Théberge
- Exponentially Monk, John Stetch
- Extra Time, The Mike Murley Quintet

=== Contemporary Jazz Album of the Year ===
Winner: New Danzon, Hilario Durán Trio

Other nominees:

- City of Neighbourhoods, Neufeld-Occhipinti Jazz Orchestra with Sam Rivers
- 5, Alain Caron
- Red Dragonfly (aka Tombo), Jane Bunnett
- Sekoya, Sekoya

=== Vocal Jazz Album of the Year ===
Winner: The Girl in the Other Room, Diana Krall

Other nominees:

- Eclipse, Kate Hammett-Vaughan Quintet
- Make Believe Ballroom, Marc Jordan
- Open Your Eyes, Dione Taylor
- That's For Me, Susie Arioli Band featuring Jordan Officer

=== Pop Album of the Year ===
Winner: Under My Skin, Avril Lavigne

Other nominees:

- Fefe Dobson, Fefe Dobson
- Home, Ryan Malcolm
- Miracle, Celine Dion
- Still Not Getting Any..., Simple Plan

=== Rock Album of the Year ===
Winner: Chuck, Sum 41

Other nominees:

- Come Again, Thornley
- Elocation, Default
- In Between Evolution, The Tragically Hip
- Seven Circles, The Tea Party

=== Roots and Traditional Album of the Year – Group ===
Winner: 40 Days, The Wailin' Jennys

Other nominees:

- Let Em Run, The Bills
- In All Things, Leahy
- Jimson Weed , Nathan
- Migration, La Volée d'Castors

=== Roots and Traditional Album of the Year – Solo ===
Winner: Hopetown, Jenny Whiteley

Other nominees:

- Acoustic Album, Amos Garrett
- Michael Jerome Browne & The Twin River String Band, Michael Jerome Browne
- The Waking Hour, David Francey
- West Eats Meet, Harry Manx

=== World Music Album of the Year ===
Winner: African Guitar Summit, Mighty Popo, Madagascar Slim, Donne Robert, Alpha Ya Ya Diallo, Adam Solomon, Pa Joe

Other nominees:

- Dho-Mach (Sacred Gift), Achilla Orru
- En Voyage, Les Gitans de Sarajevo
- Four Higher, Autorickshaw
- Road to Kashgar, Orchid Ensemble

== Nominated and winning releases ==
=== Single of the Year ===
Winner: "Crabbuckit", k-os

Other nominees:

- "Not Ready to Go", The Trews
- "One Thing", Finger Eleven
- "Party for Two", Shania Twain with Mark McGrath
- "River Below", Billy Talent

=== Aboriginal Recording of the Year ===
Winner: Taima, Taima

Other nominees:

- Green Dress, Wayne Lavallee
- Full Circle, The Pappy Johns Band
- KATAKu, Florent Vollant
- Pishimuss, Claude McKenzie

=== Best Classical Composition ===
Winner: "The Tents of Abraham", István Anhalt

Other nominees:

- "A Farmer's Symphony", John Estacio
- "Neuvas monodias espanolas", José Evangelista
- "Pangaea", Jeffrey Ryan
- "Third Symphony", Robert Turner

=== Dance Recording of the Year ===
Winner: "All Things (Just Keep Getting Better)", Widelife with Simone Denny

Other nominees:

- "All of My Life", Aluna
- "Feel Love", DJ's Rule
- "Ghetto Love, Extended Original Version", Original 3
- "Money Shot", Hatiras

=== Music DVD of the Year ===
Winner: Ron Mann, In Stereovision by Blue Rodeo

Other nominees:

- Barbara Barde, David Langer, Casablanca Media Television Inc., The Barenaked Truth by Barenaked Ladies
- John Small, Hallway Entertainment, Great Big DVD by Great Big Sea
- Michael Fischer-Ledenice, Scott Morin, A Night in Vienna by Oscar Peterson
- Marty Callner, Jake Cohl, Michael Cohl, Randy Gladstein, Stephen Howard, David Kines, Fred Nicolaidis, Dave Russell, Toronto Rocks by various artists

=== Rap Recording of the Year ===
Winner: Joyful Rebellion, k-os

Other nominees:

- "Bang Bang", Kardinal Offishall
- "F.A.M.E.", Concise
- Life's a Collection of Experiences, DL Incognito
- Say Something, Kyprios

=== Best R&B/Soul Recording of the Year ===
Winner: Keshia Chanté, Keshia Chanté

Other nominees:

- Gary Beals, Gary Beals
- More, Tamia
- Resurrected, jacksoul
- What It Is, Ray Robinson

=== Reggae Recording of the Year ===
Winner: WYSIWYG (What You See Is What You Get), Sonia Collymore

Other nominees:

- Bare as She Dare, Carl Henry featuring Ce'Ceile
- Empty Barrel, Blessed featuring Kardinal Offishall
- It's All Bless, Korexion
- Uncorrupted, Steele

=== Video of the Year ===
Winner: The Love Movement, with k-os, Micah Meisner, "B-Boy Stance" by k-os

Other nominees:

- Floria Sigismondi, "The End of the World" by The Cure
- George Vale, Feist, "One Evening" by Feist
- Stephen Scott, Barlow, "Perfect Wave" by Barlow
- Benjamin Weinstein, The Weakerthans, "The Reasons" by The Weakerthans
