= Adrianne Pieczonka =

Canadian operatic singer

Adrianne Pieczonka OC
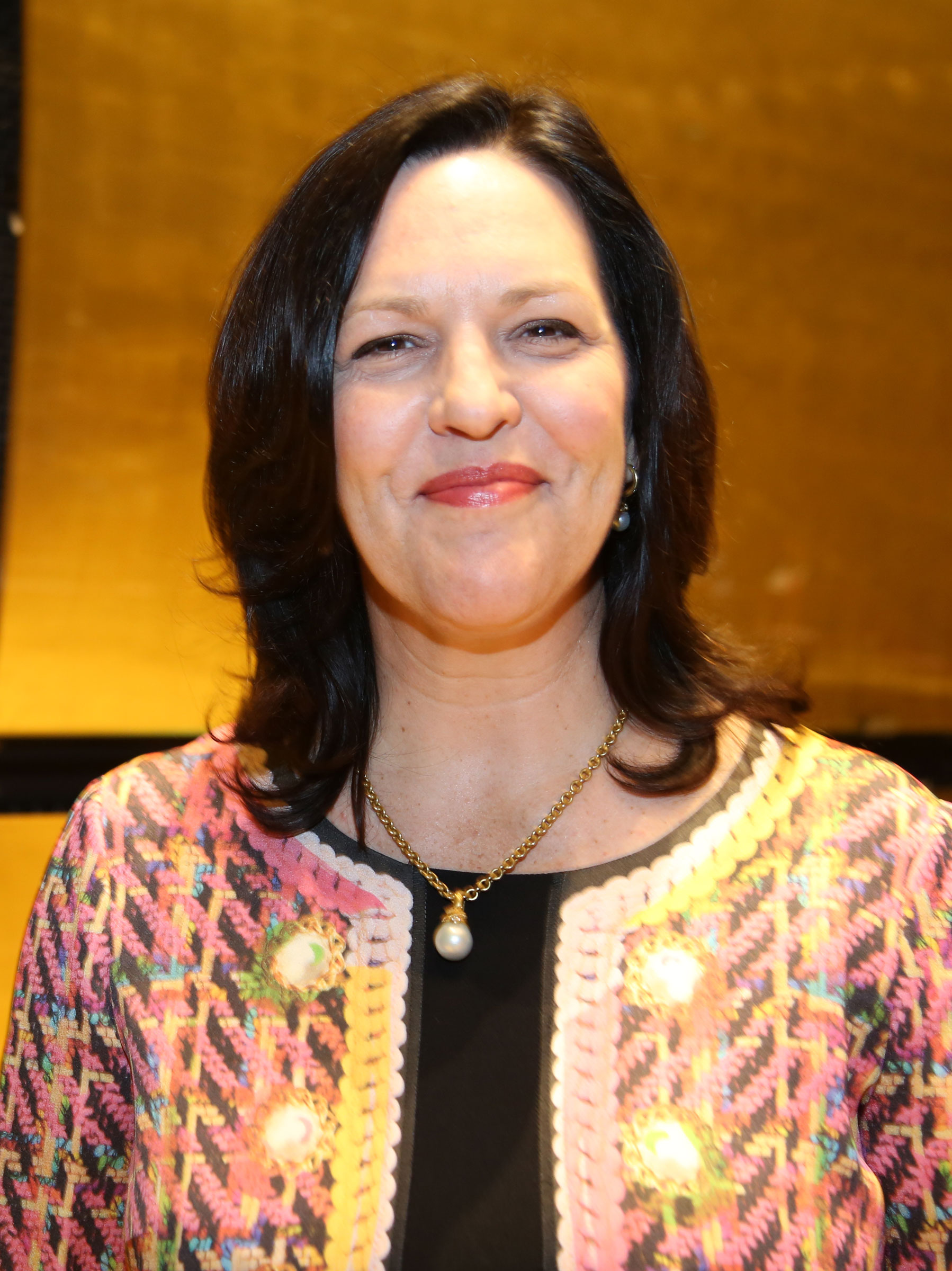
- Born: March 2, 1963 (age 63); Poughkeepsie, New York, U.S.
- Education: University of Western Ontario; University of Toronto
- Occupation: Opera singer
- Years active: 1988–present
- Organization: Vienna Volksoper
- Spouse: Laura Tucker
- Website: www.adriannepieczonka.com

Adrianne Pieczonka, OC (/ˈeɪdriːən pjɛˈtʃɔːnkə/ AY-dree-ən pyeh-CHAWN-kə; born March 2, 1963) is a Canadian operatic soprano singer.

== Life and career ==
Pieczonka was born in Poughkeepsie, New York, but her family moved to Burlington, Ontario, when she was 2 years old. As a child, she liked theatre and music and was encouraged to take piano lessons at an early age. After becoming frustrated with her piano studies, she began vocal lessons as a teenager. She completed her Bachelor studies at the University of Western Ontario with Alvin Reimer and Martin Chambers in 1985, after being denied entry into the University of Toronto’s performance program. Afterwards, she was accepted into the Opera School of the University of Toronto and studied with Mary Morrison in 1988. Upon graduating, she was awarded a Distinguished Graduate Award. In 1988, she joined the Canadian Opera Company chorus and made her professional stage debut with the Canadian Opera Company in 1988 singing The Female Prisoner in Shostakovich's Lady Macbeth of Mtensk. She was asked to join the COC ensemble, but she received a Canada Council grant to study in London with Vera Rosza and she decided to move to Europe in 1988 and quickly won first prize at the International Vocal Competition 's-Hertogenbosch in the Netherlands as well as First Prize at the International Singing Competition in La Plaine-sur-Mer, France, as well as third prize in the International Singing Competition of Toulouse.

She became a member of the Vienna Volksoper in 1989 where her roles included Countess Almaviva (The Marriage of Figaro), Donna Elvira (Don Giovanni), Laura (Der Bettelstudent) and Tatyana (Eugene Onegin). In 1991 she became a member of the Vienna State Opera where her roles included Desdemona (Otello), Antonia (The Tales of Hoffmann), Micaëla (Carmen), Die Tochter (Cardillac), Agathe (Der Freischütz), Countess Almaviva, Donna Elvira and Donna Anna (Don Giovanni), Ellen Orford (Peter Grimes), Eva (Die Meistersinger von Nürnberg), title role in Arabella, Ariadne in Ariadne auf Naxos, and The Marschallin (Der Rosenkavalier). Also in 1991, she was selected by conductor Georg Solti to sing Erste Dame in a recording of Mozart's Die Zauberflöte.

She moved to London, England in 1995, and made her British debut at Glyndebourne as Donna Elvira in Don Giovanni, returning there for Arabella in 1996. She made her debut at the Royal Opera House as Donna Anna in 2002. Pieczonka moved back to Toronto, Canada in 2005 and performed regularly with the Canadian Opera Company. Her roles over many years have included Mimi (La bohème), Sieglinde (Die Walküre), Elisabetta (Don Carlo), Leonore (Fidelio), the title role in Tosca, and Amelia (Un ballo in maschera). She was awarded a Dora Award for her outstanding portrayal of Sieglinde in the 2004 production of Die Walküre.

She debuted at the Metropolitan Opera in 2004 as Lisa in Tchaikovsky's The Queen of Spades. At the Met, she has also performed Sieglinde (Die Walküre), Amelia (Simon Boccanegra), Chrysothemis (Elektra), Leonore (Fidelio) and Madame Lidoine (Dialogues des Carmélites).

Pieczonka has performed with the world's leading opera companies for over three decades. Some of these include the Bavarian State Opera, Deutsche Oper Berlin, Berlin State Opera, Hamburg State Opera, Zurich Opera, Teatro Real, Liceu, Teatro Arriaga, Paris Opera, Grand Théâtre de Genève, Los Angeles Opera, Teatro Colón, San Francisco Opera, Houston Grand Opera, along with many others. In her home country of Canada, she sang in operas staged in Hamilton (Popera, 1988), Edmonton (Countess, 1990), Calgary (Countess in 1991), Toronto (Mimì, 1994) and Vancouver (Nyade, 1989 and Countess, 1992). She made her Salzburg Festival debut in 2001 singing a concert version of Lohengrin and has since sung Elisabetta, The Marschallin and Leonore at this prestigious festival. She made her Bayreuth Festival debut in 2006, singing Sieglinde in Die Walküre and was hailed by Die Zeit as "The Sieglinde of our time" She returned to Bayreuth to sing Senta in The Flying Dutchman in 2012. Other roles include Tatiana (Eugene Onegin), Kaiserin (Die Frau ohne Schatten), Freia (Das Rheingold), Elsa (Lohengrin), and Elisabeth (Tannhäuser).

Pieczonka has worked with the world's finest conductors in concert and opera including Sir Georg Solti, Christian Thielemann, Claudio Abbado, Riccardo Muti, Zubin Mehta, Lorin Maazel, Pierre Boulez, James Levine, Semyon Bychkov, Kent Nagano, Sir Colin Davis, Daniel Barenboim, Sir Donald Runnicles, Philippe Jordan, Yannick Nézet-Séguin, and Richard Bradshaw, among many others.

On the concert stage and as a recitalist, Pieczonka has performed at Toronto's Massey Hall and Roy Thomson Hall, the Edinburgh Festival, The Proms, Salle Pleyel in Paris, Vienna's Musikverein and Konzerthaus, Tokyo Bunka Kaikan, The Orpheum in Vancouver, Schubertiade in Schwarzenberg, Austria, Carnegie Hall and Avery Fisher Hall, New York, among many others.

In 2019 she was appointed the first Vocal Chair at the Glenn Gould School, where she gives regular masterclasses, and oversees the vocal department and their opera productions.

In 2023, she planned to sing Judith in Bluebeard’s Castle with Gerald Finley, but cancelled as she felt that parts of the role were out of her comfort zone. She had just turned 60 and decided to retire.

== Vocal Quality ==
Robert Everett-Green from the Globe and Mail describes Pieczonka as “a fine, intelligent singer in any situation, with a creamy tone and lustrous colour throughout her range." She describes her voice as being "somewhere between a lyric and a dramatic soprano". In response to a recital of Wagner and Strauss arias, John Freeman from Opera News describes her timbre as even and clear with appreciable strength and narrow, controlled vibrato.Throughout her career she has sung Mozart, Verdi and Puccini, but as her voice progressed it lent itself to the roles of Strauss and Wagner.

== Awards and honours ==
The Spain’s critics’ association selected her as the best female opera singer of 2002-3 and the Globe and Mail named her the top-10 artists of 2006.

Pieczonka's 2006 album Adrianne Pieczonka Sings Wagner and Strauss, on the Orfeo label, was nominated for Classical Album of the Year - Vocal or Choral Performance at the Juno Awards of 2007. Her next CD Adrianne Pieczonka sings Puccini won the category in the Juno Awards of 2010.

In March 2007, Pieczonka was invested as an Austrian Kammersängerin. She, along with tenor Michael Schade, are the first two Canadian singers to have had this honour. In 2008, she was made an Officer of the Order of Canada. In 2012, she was a recipient of the Queen Elizabeth II Diamond Jubilee Medal.

In 2010, her Lohengrin recording conducted by Semyon Bychkov was named “Disc of the Year” and received the “Opera Award” at the BBC Music Magazine Awards.

In 2014 she received the Paul de Hueck and Norman Walford Career Achievement Award from the Ontario Arts Foundation. She has received Honorary Doctorates from McMaster University, Hamilton and from her alma mater, University of Western Ontario. She received a Ruby Award from Opera Canada in 2015. She is an Honorary Fellow of the Royal Society of Canada as well as an Honorary Fellow of the Royal Conservatory of Music in Toronto.

== Personal life ==
She resides in Toronto with her wife, mezzo-soprano Laura Tucker, their kid George (they/them), and their cat Sadie.

== Discography ==
- Die Zauberflöte. Georg Solti, Wiener Philharmoniker (1991, Decca)
- Die Orchesterlieder. Friedrich Haider, Orchestre Philharmonique de Nice (2000, Nightingale)
- Highlights of the Millenium Opera Gala. Toronto Symphony Orchestra (2000, CBC)
- Don Giovanni. Michael Halasz, Nicholaus Esterházy Sinfonia (2001, Naxos)
- Falstaff. Claudio Abbado, Berlin Philharmonic Orchestra (2001, DGC)
- Adrianne Pieczonka sings Wagner & Strauss. Ulf Schirmer, Münchner Rundfunkorchester (2006, Orfeo)
- Beethoven: Ideals of the French Revolution. Kent Nagano, Orchestre symphonique de Montréal (2008, Analekta)
- Lohengrin. Semyon Bychkov, WDR Sinfonieorchester Köln (2009, Profil)
- Adrianne Pieczonka sings Puccini. Dan Ettinger, Münchner Rundfunkorchester (2009, Orfeo)
- Don Giovanni. Ricardo Muti, Wiener Philharmoniker (2009, Arthaus)
- Die Fledermaus. Friedrich Haider, Orchester der Ungarischen Staatsoper (2012, Nightingale)
- Adrianne Pieczonka sings Strauss, Wagner. Brian Zeger, piano (2015, Delos)
- Erich Wolfgang Korngold: Complete Songs (Sämtliche Lieder). Konrad Jarnot, Reinild Mees, piano (2015, Capriccio)
- Lyrical Voices. Alexander Shelley, Canada’s National Arts Centre Orchestra (2021, Analekta)

== Video ==
- Der Rosenkavalier. Semyon Bychkov, Wiener Philharmoniker (2010, Arthaus)
- Simon Boccanegra. James Levine, The Metropolitan Opera Orchestra (2011, Sony)
- Berlin Opera Night. Kent Nagano, Orchester der Deutschen Oper Berlin (2011, EuroArts)
- Elektra. Esa-Pekka Salonen, Orchestre de Paris (2014, Bel Air Classiques)
