= Achilla Orru =

Uganda-born musician (1959–2013)

King Achilla Rufino Orru Apaa-idomo (August 17, 1959 – February 4, 2013) was a Uganda-born blind musician whose primary instrument was the lukembé. His ethnic background was Karamojong.

== Early life and education ==
Orru was born in Karamoja, Uganda. After losing his sight at age seven, he attended Madera Special School for the Blind; he learned to play the Kalimba (thumb piano), and won a junior prize for his skill with this instrument.

Orru came to Canada as a refugee in 1989. He studied international development at Dalhousie University in Halifax, graduating in 1995. While there he formed a band, Baana Afrique.

== Career ==
Orru moved to Toronto after graduation, and reformed his band with local musicians in 1995. He toured both with them and as a solo musician, using the stage name King Achilla Orru Apaa-Idomo. He released an album of lukembe music, Apaa-Idomo, in 1996.

In Toronto, Orru was also well known as a TTC subway musician, often playing at Bloor-Yonge subway station.

In 2003 Orru performed at the World Music Exposition in Germany.

Orru's 2004 album Dho-Mach (Sacred Gift) was nominated for the 2005 Juno Award for World Music Album of the Year. In 2008 he performed as a soloist with the Royal Dutch Wind Ensemble in Amsterdam.

Orru died on February 4, 2013, at the age of 53.

== Personal life ==
Orru frequently visited Uganda, and in 2004 was married there. He and his wife Rose have three children. Before his first trip back he had his first born in Halifax Canada Benjamin then furthered his career. At the time of his death he was in the process of bringing his family to Canada.
