= Autorickshaw (band) =

Canadian world music band

- Origin: Toronto, Canada
- Genres: World music
- Years active: 2003–present
- Labels: Tala-Wallah Records
- Members: Suba Sankaran; Ed Hanley; Dylan Bell
- Website: autorickshaw.ca

Autorickshaw is a Canadian world music band that performs a blend of Indian Carnatic and Hindustani music with Western pop, funk, and jazz. Formed in 2003 in Toronto, the group consists of vocalist Suba Sankaran, tabla player Ed Hanley, and bassist and beatboxer Dylan Bell.

They are three-time Juno Award nominees for World Music Album of the Year, receiving nominations at the Juno Awards of 2005 for Four Higher, at the Juno Awards of 2008 for So the Journey Goes, and at the Juno Awards of 2018 for Meter.

The band has regularly toured both Canada and India.

== Band members ==
- Suba Sankaran – vocals
- Ed Hanley – tabla
- Dylan Bell – bass, beatboxing

== Discography ==
- Autorickshaw (2003)
- Four Higher (2004)
- So the Journey Goes (2007)
- The Humours of Autorickshaw (2013)
- Meter (2017)
