= Ammoye =

Jamaican-Canadian reggae musician

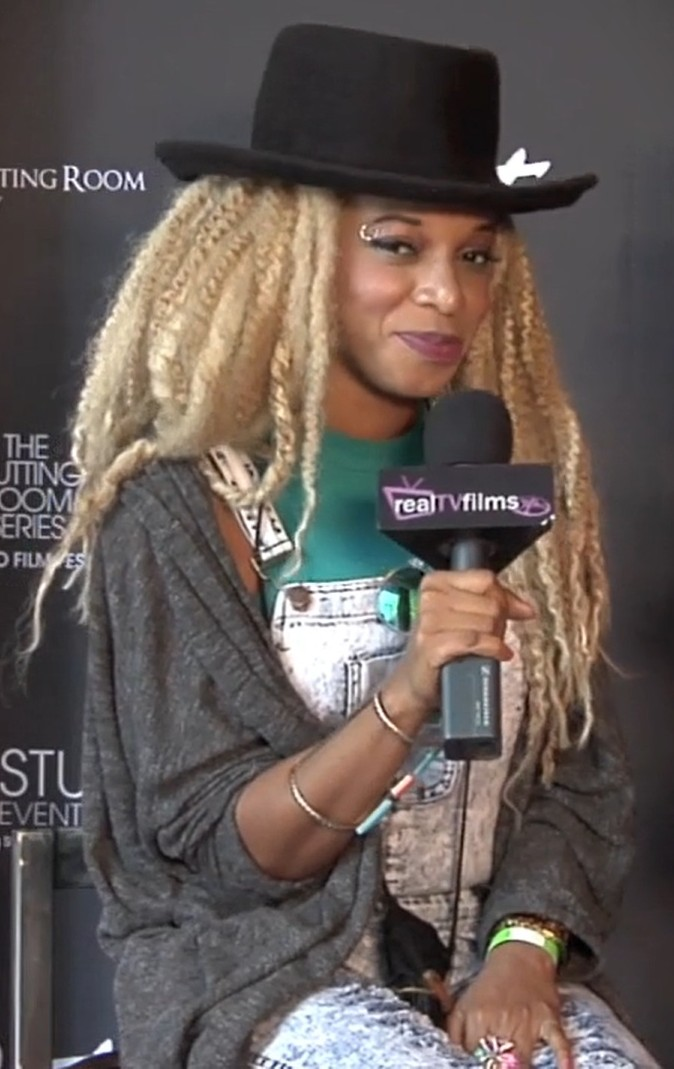
Ammoye in 2014

Shernette Amoy Evans, known by the stage name Ammoye, is a Jamaican-Canadian reggae musician, most noted as a seven-time Juno Award nominee for Reggae Recording of the Year.

Originally from Halse Hall in Jamaica, she moved to Toronto, Ontario as a teenager. She participated in the Toronto music scene in the 2000s, most notably contributing music to the Version Xcursion compilation of Jamaican Canadian artists. Her first album was Haffi Win, a collaboration with Eric Vani of Flying Down Thunder and Rise Ashen.

She received her first Juno Award nomination at the Juno Awards of 2013 for her single "Radio". She was subsequently nominated at the Juno Awards of 2014 for the single "Baby It's You", at the Juno Awards of 2017 for the single "Sorry", at the Juno Awards of 2018 for the album The Light, at the Juno Awards of 2021 for the single "Give It All", at the Juno Awards of 2023 for her album Water, and at the Juno Awards of 2024 for "Stir This Thing".

== Discography ==
- Haffi Win (2010, with Rise Ashen)
- Enter the Warrioress (2016)
- The Light (2017)
- I Am Love (2020)
- Water (2021)
