= The Franklin Electric =

Canadian indie folk music group

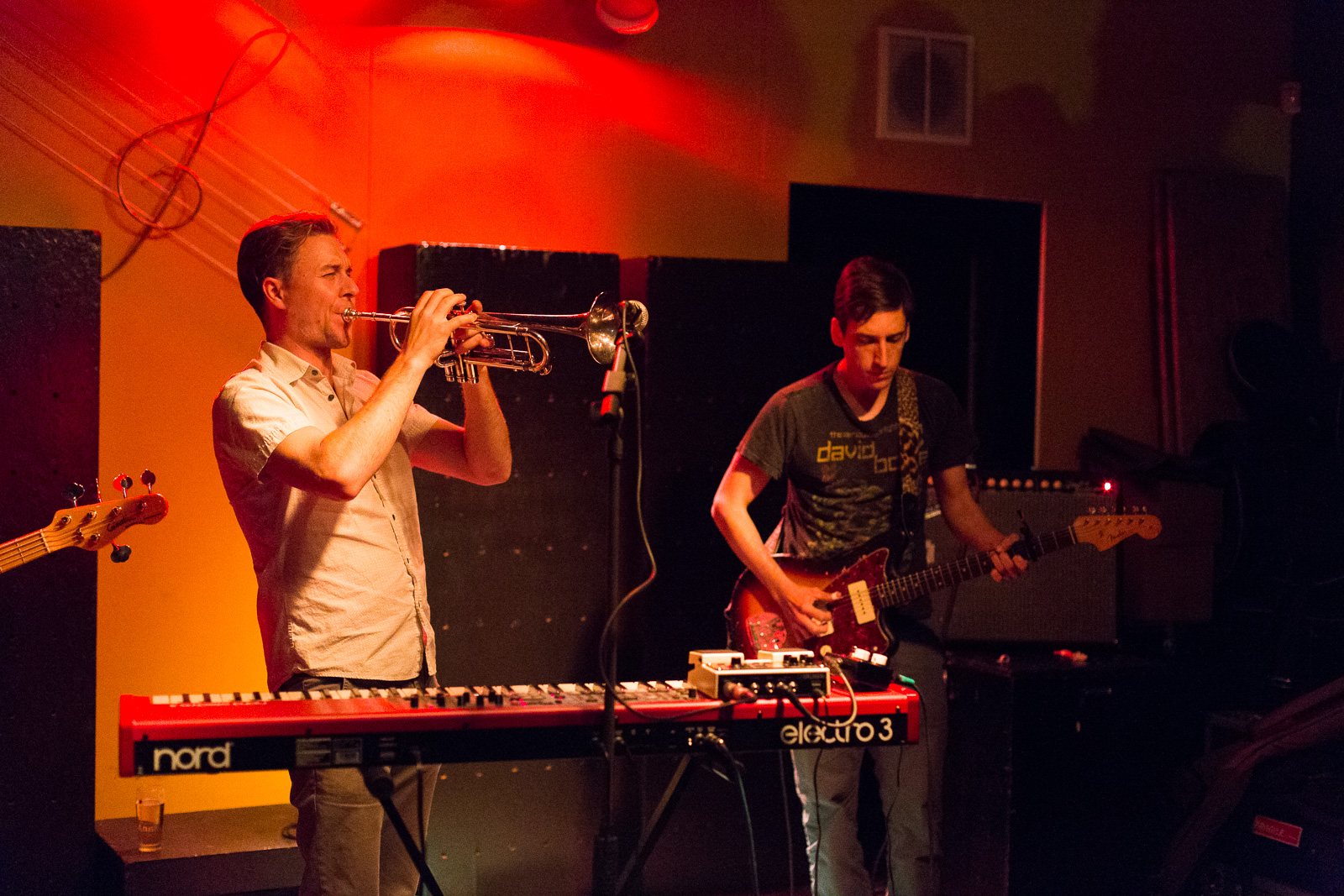

Background information
- Origin: Montreal, Quebec, Canada
- Genre: indie folk
- Years active: 2014-present
- Label: Nettwerk Music Group
- Members: Jon Matte
- Past members: Adam Passalacqua; Martin Desrosby; Ken Presse; Jean-Sébastien Leblanc; Johnny Griffin; Alexis Messier; Liam Killen; Kevin Warren; Katherine McNally
- Website: Official website

The Franklin Electric are a Canadian indie folk collective formed by singer-songwriter Jon Matte from Montreal, Quebec, most noted for receiving a Juno Award nomination for Breakthrough Group of the Year at the Juno Awards of 2018. The band's core member is singer and guitarist Jon Matte, with a rotating line up of supporting musicians that currently includes Paul Lucyk on bass and keyboard, Pete Pételle on drums, and James Clayton on guitar.

== History ==
The Franklin Electric's debut album, This Is How I Let You Down, was self-released in 2013 before being reissued in 2014 by Indica Records. The album was supported with a cross-Canada tour, as well as several dates as an opening act for other bands in Europe. The band created an animated video for the song "The Strongest Man Alive".

The group released a second album, Blue Ceilings in February 2017; the songs are an eclectic mix of folk, pop, and electronic indie pop. They toured in Canada and Australia in support of the album, and then went on to perform in Germany in April.

== Discography ==
- This Is How I Let You Down (2013)
- Blue Ceilings (2017)
- In Your Head EP (2019)
- In Your Heart EP (2020)
- Never Look Back (2020)
- This Time I See It (2021)
- Oh Brother (2023)
- Victory Songs (2025)
