= Andru Branch =

Canadian reggae musician

- Birth name: Andru Reginald Arnold Branch
- Born: June 27, 1968 (age 57); Sackville, New Brunswick, Canada
- Origin: Toronto, Ontario, Canada
- Genres: reggae, world
- Instrument(s): keyboard, percussion
- Years active: 1985 – present
- Labels: Kingston Muzik
- Website: halfwaytree.ca

Andru Branch (born June 27, 1968) is a Canadian reggae musician. He is the lead singer-songwriter of the reggae band Andru Branch & Halfway Tree. He was nominated for a Juno Award for his debut 1998 album What If I Told You.

== Early life ==
Branch was born Andru Reginald Arnold Branch on June 27, 1968, in Sackville, New Brunswick.

== Career ==
Branch was signed to independent Jamaican record label Kingston Muzik in 1996. Branch recorded and mixed his 1998 debut album What If I Told You at Kingston Muzik Studio in Kingston, Jamaica. Its title was taken from a popular saying ("the only constant in life is change") favoured by Andru's late mother. The album was distributed with modified artwork in Europe and the United States by Tabou 1 Records and features Earl "Chinna" Smith and members of Bob Marley's backing band "The Wailers"; Aston "Family Man" Barrett, Tyrone Downie, and Alvin "Seeco" Patterson. Branch was nominated for a Juno Award at the Juno Awards of 2000 for this release in the category Best Reggae Recording.

His second album The Only Constant was released in January 2008 and features Squidly Cole and Chris Meredith of Ziggy Marley's band along with Alvin "Seeco" Patterson from The Wailers. The Only Constant is straight-up roots-reggae, brimming with lush horns, placid backbeats and spiritual proclamations".

Andru's traditional roots-reggae style is wide-ranging, varying from African high-life to suggestions of country influence and has been described by Exclaim! Magazine as "some of the rootsiest bottom-heavy music ever to come out of the Great White North". He performed at Jamaica's 1998 Reggae Sunsplash Festival and as a percussionist, has backed musicians Brinsley Forde, Gregory Isaacs, Glen Washington, Vybz Kartel and Sean Paul.

Studio One's original Soul Vendors bassist Brian "Bassie" Atkinson joined Andru Branch & Halfway Tree in 2002 and the band is currently making new reggae music.

Andru developed a profound love for reggae music while growing up in multicultural Toronto, Ontario, where he was mentored by Tony "Raffa" White and Bernie Pitters before moving to Halifax, Nova Scotia, in 2000. Andru Branch graduated from Lawrence Park Collegiate and received a "Sound & Music Recording Diploma" from Recording Arts Canada.

== Discography ==
=== Albums ===
- Andru Branch: What If I Told You (1998)
- Andru Branch: The Only Constant (2008)
- Andru Branch & Halfway Tree: My Jamaican Weed – Single (2008)
- Andru Branch : Rocksteady – Single (2010)
- Andru Branch & Halfway Tree: Step Into The Light (2012)
- Andru Branch: Happy Day – Single (2014)
- Andru Branch & Halfway Tree: Step Into The Dub (2017)

=== Appears On ===
- Confrontation; It's A New Day (1999)
- Various; Roots with Quality: Best of Tabou 1, Vol 1 (1999)
- Chris Bottomley; Knotty Bits (2003)
- Various; Real Roots Reggae – A Canadian Story (2007)

=== Video ===
- Holy Jihad (2008)

== See also ==
- Music of Canada
- List of Canadian musicians
