= Naida Cole =

Canadian-American concert pianist (born 1974)

Naida Margaret Cole (born October 28, 1974, in Durham, North Carolina, U.S.) is a Canadian-American concert pianist who left a successful career as a recording artist and touring musician in 2007 to pursue medicine, studying at the Warren Alpert Medical School.

== Early life ==
Cole was born in the USA, lived in Saudi Arabia and the United Kingdom as a child, and moved to Canada in 1984. She graduated from The Royal Conservatory of Music in Toronto at the age of 13, making her the second youngest to receive the school's ARCT degree (the youngest was Glenn Gould); at RCM she studied with Marina Geringas. She later studied piano at the Peabody Conservatory of Johns Hopkins University with the pianist and conductor Leon Fleisher, and flute with flutist Robert Willoughby. Other studies brought her to the Fondazione Internazionale per il pianoforte in Cadenabbia, Italy, and to the University of Montreal, where she earned her Masters in Music and studied with Marc Durand. Her decision to become a pianist was made while she attended the Chetham's School of Music.

== Musical career ==
She has recorded music by Fauré, Chabrier, Satie and Ravel. She has performed with the Toronto Symphony, the Montreal Symphony Orchestra and National Arts Centre Orchestras and also with Gidon Kremer's Kremerata Baltica, the London Sinfonietta and the Munich, Warsaw and Royal Liverpool Philharmonic Orchestras.

Her debut recording (of music by Fauré, Chabrier, Satie and Ravel) was released on Decca, and was named one of the Critics’ Favourite CDs of 2001 by Gramophone Magazine. BBC Music Magazine awarded it five (out of five) stars. She performed on multiple occasions with Gidon Kremer and with his ensemble Kremerata Baltica, and appeared on their recording After Mozart.

== Discography ==
compact discs
	title	label	date	catalog number	notes
1.	Naida Cole: Faure, Chabrier, Satie, Ravel	Decca	13 February 2001	748 021-2	
2.	Reflections: Ravel, Bartok, Liszt	Decca	11 February 2003	472 464-2	

== Awards ==
- Tenth Van Cliburn International Piano Competition (1997)
  - Phyllis Jones Tilley Memorial Award for Best Performance of Commissioned Work
  - Steven De Groote Memorial Award for Best Performance of Chamber Music
  - Semifinalist
- Juno Award (2000): Nominee, Best Classical Album (Solo or Chamber Ensemble)

== Medical career and personal life ==
Cole obtained her MD from the Warren Alpert Medical School of Brown University. She completed an internship at Cambridge Health Alliance (Massachusetts), and then her residency in anesthesiology at Massachusetts General Hospital. Cole is currently an Assistant Professor in the Department of Anesthesia and Critical Care at the University of Chicago.

She is married to a marine biologist and lives in Hyde Park, Illinois.
