= Kairo McLean =

Canadian reggae musician

Kairo McLean is a Canadian reggae musician from Toronto, Ontario, who, in 2022 at the age of 13, became the youngest artist ever to win a Juno Award, winning in the category Reggae Recording of the Year.

On February 24, 2025, CBC Music published a list of "The 10 best Reggae Canadian Songs" and included "Easy Now" and "Reggae Party" in the list. About "Easy Now", CBC writes "With a vocal delivery well beyond his years, McLean is in command." The same article notes "Reggae Party" as a "passing of the baton" from Kirk Diamond to McLean.
