= Saint Alvia =

Canadian band

- Also known as: The Saint Alvia Cartel
- Origin: Burlington, Ontario, Canada
- Genres: Rock; Punk; Reggae
- Years active: 2005–2013
- Labels: Stomp; Warner Music Canada
- Members: Greg Taylor; Ben Rispin; Matt Richmond; Greg Fisher; Jon Laurin; Adam Michael
- Website: Saint Alvia

Saint Alvia, formerly The Saint Alvia Cartel, was a band formed in 2005 from Burlington, Ontario, Canada. The band's self-titled debut album was nominated for a Juno Award for Rock Album of the Year at the 2008 Juno Awards.

== History ==
Saint Alvia was formed by Rob Pasalic (formerly of Boys Night Out) and Greg Taylor (formerly of Jersey and Grade). The band is named after Ernest Alvia Smith, Canada's last living recipient of the Victoria Cross for valour in World War II.

With roots in punk rock, the band drew inspiration from other genres which included rock and roll, blues, soul, dancehall reggae, country, new wave, and hip hop. After recording and releasing demo tracks via MySpace in 2006, the band was signed to Montreal's Stomp Records and released their self-titled debut album in May 2006. The lead single "Don't Wanna Wait Forever" was released in the summer of 2007 and went into the Top 20 for Modern Rock Radio in Canada.

The band followed the 2007 release with 2008's critically acclaimed Between the Lines.

Saint Alvia played their final show on 7 December 2013.

They reunited [at least] one last time for Walk off the Earth's Mike Taylor's memorial and tribute concert.

== Members ==
- Greg Taylor – Vocals / Guitar
- Ben Rispin – Vocals
- Matt Richmond – Drums / Vocals
- Greg Fisher – Guitar / Vocals
- Jon Laurin – Keyboards
- Adam Michael – Bass, Backing Vocals

== Former members ==
- Brandon Bliss – Keyboards / Vocals
- Rob Pasalic – Vocals / Guitar
- Chuck Coles – Bass
- Mike Casarin – Bass

== Additional musicians ==
- Fatty McGinty of the Creepshow – Trombone (Try To Forget)
- John Coombs of The Next Best Thing – Trumpet (Try To Forget)
- Adam Michaels – Guitar (Stones On The Road)
- Jon Atley – Bongoes (Don't Wanna Wait Forever)
- Laura Jane Bradfield – Vocals (Blonde Kryptonite)

Between The Lines

- Fatty McGinty of The Creepshow – Trombone (Decadencia De Civilizacion, Roll With it)
- Ricky Snips of The Snips – Trumpet (Decadencia De Civilizacion, Roll With it, Mornings In Feng Tu)
- Wade Mcneil of Alexisonfire/Black Lungs – Additional Vocals (Mornings in Feng Tu)

== Discography ==
=== Albums ===
- The Saint Alvia Cartel – 4 song demo (2006 – Self Released)
- The Saint Alvia Cartel (2007 – Stomp Records)
- Between The Lines (2008 – Stomp Records)
- Jonxer 7-inch (2010 – Paper and Plastic)
- Static Psalms (2013 – Divergent Recordings)

=== Compilations ===
- Borrowed Tunes – A Neil Young Tribute (Thrasher)
- Juiceboxdotcom.com compilation – Don't Wanna Wait Forever (Phil B's Sunshine Remix)

=== Singles ===
- Don't Wanna Wait Forever
- Time To Go
- Blonde Kryptonite
- Between The Lines
- Walk Before You Run DMC
- Romeo
- Mothers Day
- Define Me

== Awards ==
- 2009 MuchMusic Video Awards: Best Post-Production ( The Saint Alvia Cartel – "Blonde Kryptonite" (post-production: Nick Flook, Mike Sevigny & Jeff Middleton)) – Nominated
- Juno Awards of 2008: Rock Album of the Year(The Saint Alvia Cartel) – Nominated
- Juno Awards of 2009: Best Video – Blonde Kryptonite ( Directed by Davin Black)-Nominated
- 2009 FU Awards: – Best FU song ( Romeo)- Nominated
- 2008 Hamilton Music Awards: Best Punk Album of the Year – Nominated
- 2008 Hamilton Music Awards: Video of The Year ( Between The Lines Directed by Davin Black, Produced by Ben Rispin) – Nominated
- 2007 Hamilton Music Awards: Best New Band – Won

== Interviews ==
- Saint Alvia’s new album out next Tuesday ups the politics Interview with TorontoMusicScene.ca
- Saint Alvia Cartel article July 2007
- Altsounds: interview
- Truth Explosion: article
- Supernova: article
- City News: article

== See also ==
- List of bands from Canada
