= Lyndon John X =

Canadian musician

Lyndon John X, sometimes also credited as LJX, is a Canadian reggae and ska musician. He is most noted for his 2019 album The Warning Track, which won the Juno Award for Reggae Recording of the Year at the Juno Awards of 2020.

Of Grenadian descent, he grew up in Cambridge, Ontario. Born Lyndon John, he added the X to his performing name in tribute to Malcolm X. He released his debut album Two Chord Skankin’ in 2007, and received his first Juno Award nomination in the reggae category at the Juno Awards of 2008.

He followed up with the albums Brighter Days in 2010, which was a Juno nominee at the Juno Awards of 2011, and Escape from the Mongoose Gang in 2015, which was a Juno nominee at the Juno Awards of 2016.
