= Exco Levi =

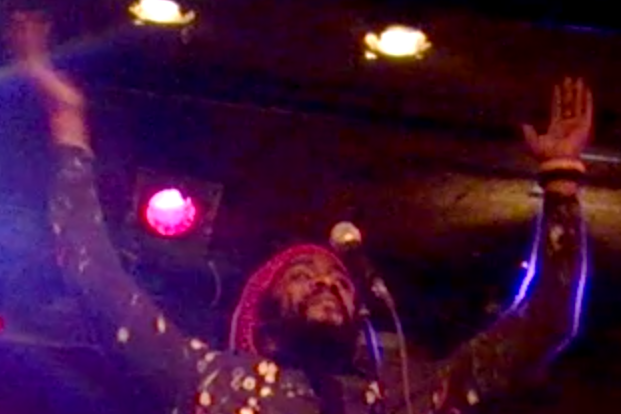
- Exco Levi photographed in Montréal, Québec, Canada in La Sala Rossa.

Background information
- Born: Wayne Ford Levy c.1981 Harmons, Jamaica
- Genre: Reggae
- Years active: 2007–present
- Labels: VP, Penthouse, High Priest
- Website: www.excolevimusic.com

Wayne Ford Levy (born c.1981), known by his stage name Exco Levi, is a Brampton-based, Jamaican-Canadian reggae musician. Levi has won five Juno Awards.

== Career ==
Born in Harmons in Manchester Parish, Jamaica, Levi's early singing experience came from the school choir. His father, Michael 'Mr Cool' Levy worked as a selector on the Super Soul sound system in Clarendon. He moved to Canada in 2005, and started his recording career in 2007, releasing the single "O' Canada" that year. His 'Exco' stage name is a reference to his football idol, Andrés Escobar.

Levi was introduced to producer Donovan Germain by Richie Stephens, and the two began working together. His track "Bleaching Shop", recorded with Germain, won the Juno Award for Reggae Recording of the Year in 2012. He also won Junos for "Storms of Life" (2013), and "Strive" (2014). He has also worked with German producers Silly Walks.

In December 2014 he performed at Sting, and in January 2015 he was on the bill of Rebel Salute. In March 2015 he released his second album, Country Man. He won a fourth Juno Award for 2015's "Welcome the King".

In 2016, Levi was living and maintaining a studio in Brampton, Ontario, while also working at times in Jamaica. That year he was inducted into the Brampton Arts Walk of Fame.

In 2017, Levi won a fifth Juno Award for his reggae song "Siren". In November 2017, Levi released his third album, Narrative, featuring guest contributions from Raging Fyah and Sizzla.

In 2019, Levi was nominated for a Juno Award for the seventh time in eight years for his Narrative album which was produced by Silly Walks from Germany.

In 2020, the song "Wah Gwaan" earned Levi his eighth Juno nomination.

Most recently Levi received his ninth Juno Award nomination in 2022, for the song "By Any Means".

== Discography ==
=== Albums ===
- Words of the Wise EP (2014), VP
- Country Man (2015), High Priest/Penthouse
- Narrative (2017), Silly Walks Discotheque
- Black Creek EP (2021), High Priest.
