= Prince Blanco =

Canadian musician

Prince Blanco is a British singer and multi-instrumentalist based in Toronto, Canada. Performing and recording mainly as a reggae and ska artist, he also draws inspiration from punk rock and cumbia.

In 2010 Blanco won a Canadian JUNO Award for Reggae Recording of the Year along with producer Dubmatix for their single, "Gonna Be Alright" (7 Arts).

Prince Blanco is also known for being the executive producer of Shatter the Hotel: A Dub Inspired Tribute to Joe Strummer, a compilation album whose proceeds benefitted The Joe Strummer Foundation.

From 2013 until 2015 Blanco co-hosted The Bassment Sessions, a weekly radio broadcast hosted by Dubmatix.

As a vocalist and musician, Blanco still occasionally works with Dubmatix, Citizen Sound and other producers.

In 2021 he joined Toronto-based cumbia group, Cachada as a singer and percussionist, releasing two singles with them in early 2022.

In the late 1990s, Prince Blanco was a singer and drummer with the Toronto ska band, The Skanksters. From 2001 to 2005 he was a singer and percussionist with ska-lypso big band, The Liquidaires.

== Selected discography ==
Year	Group	Title	Format	Label
1997	The Skanksters	Dub Cookery	Album	Simmerdown USA
2003	The Liquidaires	Looking Up	Album	Mojobrand
2005	Boogiewall Soundsystem	Supermyownband	Album	OhmGrown/Universal
2005	The Liquidaires	Meeting Place	Album	Mojobrand
2006	Prince Blanco & The Rocksteady Allstars	Prince Blanco & The Rocksteady Allstars	E.P.	Mojobrand
2008	Prince Blanco	Rebel Discothèque	Album	MojoBrand
2008	Dubmatix featuring Prince Blanco	"Don't Pressurize Me"	Single	7 Arts
2008	Dubmatix featuring Prince Blanco	"Gonna Be Alright"	Single	7 Arts
2009	Prince Blanco	"Tuff Dub"	Single	Citizen Sound
2014	Dubmatix featuring Prince Blanco	"Anarchy in the UK"	Single	7 Arts
2020	Dubmatix featuring Prince Blanco	"Israelites"	Single	7 Arts
