= Mikey Dangerous =

Jamaican/Canadian reggae musician

Mikey Dangerous is the stage name of Michael Glanville, Jamaican/Canadian reggae artist. Dangerous was presented with a Juno Award for best Reggae Recording by the Canadian Academy of Recording Arts and Sciences for his single "Don’t Go Pretending" (MBoss Records).

== Early life ==
Dangerous was born and raised in Kingston, Jamaica.

== Career ==
Mikey Dangerous' first single is entitled "Rasta Don’t Dwell" which was released on 45 rpm 7-inch by Young Lions label. The song was later released on a compilation titled after the single. The Young Lions label released another six singles for Dangerous on 45 rpm 7-inch, starting with "Gal Yuh a Di Wife". His next single "Performance Drive" appeared on the Millennium Dancehall Style Vol. 1 compilation (VP Records).

Dangerous has recorded a number of songs, including "Don't Go Pretending", "Higher Than High", "So Proud" "You Are So Fine" (MBoss Records), "Your Love" (WildGeese Records), "The Only One" (Rootdown Records, Germany; 7inch 45’), "MR. MURDERAH" (MBoss Records), "Can’t Stop My Flow" featured on Poirier's Album "Running High" (Ninjatune Records.) "Opposites Attract" (Mountain Edge Productions), and "Silent Treatment" (Socalled).

In addition to his own recordings, Dangerous has been a featured guest in a variety of collaborations, including a song with Dubmatique, another feature on Malicious’ album Music starts with M in "Harder", and one with R&B group Addictive in "Little Game".

Dangerous has performed at many festivals. He twice was given top billing at the Saskatoon Reggae and World Music Festival. He also performed at Ottawa's Jam Day 2013 Celebration, JUNOFEST, Montreal's Jamaica Day Celebrations, Toronto's Jamaica Day, Hamilton's Biggest Canada Day Celebration "It’s Your Festival", Toronto's Irie Fest, Montreal International Reggae Festival, the Calgary International Reggae Festival, Saskatoon International Reggae Festival, (if3.ca) International FreeSki Film Festival (for three consecutive years), Barbados Reggae Splash, and Montreal International Tropical Festival. He has also performed at clubs, concerts, arts events and charity fundraisers.

Dangerous’ music has appeared on TV shows/commercials including Canadian produced sitcom "Da kink in my hair".

In 2008 he won a Juno Award for Best Reggae Recording. The winning song was "Don't Go Pretending"

In 2015 Dangerous was once again nominated for a Juno award for Reggae recording of the year with his song "Wake Up!".
