= Lazo (musician) =

Lazo (né Lazarus J. Finn) is a reggae musician from Castle Bruce, Dominica. He immigrated to Canada in 1979 and holds a degree in political science from the University of Toronto.

== Music career ==
Lazo began his music career at the age of 15 with a band called Black Blood, whose debut album charted #2 and received extensive airplay in the Caribbean. Soon after immigrating to Canada, Lazo formed his own band, Unity, releasing a recording in 1990.

In 2010, Lazo sang with Bob Marley and the Wailers on their US and South American tours.

== Awards ==
Lazo has been named the Top Reggae Performer of the Year by the Canadian Reggae Music Awards and in 2000 his release Heart and Soul won the Juno for Best Reggae Recording.
