= K'Coneil =

Singer-songwriter born in Jamaica and migrated to the US

Singer-songwriter K'Coneil was born in Jamaica and migrated to the United States on a college scholarship. His music is a fusion of reggae, pop and r&b that he calls "Genre Fluid."

He gained popularity with the release of singles like "Light Skin Love" produced by Sean 'Seanizzle' Reid.

In 2016, K'Coneil released his debut EP titled "Love/Lust" who charted on billboard, and top 10 reggae iTunes chart. The EP delivered hit singles like "Hot Like You," "Feel So Right," and "Loving You Right."

In 2016, he teamed up with Canadian recording artist Kreesha Turner on the single "Love How You Whine" produced by Grammy award producer Troyton Rami. The 2 performed the single at the 2016 Canadian CUT Hip Hop Awards in Toronto, Canada.

K'Coneil was described as a blend of Sean Paul and Usher and after his first Jamaican promo tour was called the next Jamaican breakthrough superstar.
