= Jay Douglas (musician) =

Canadian musician

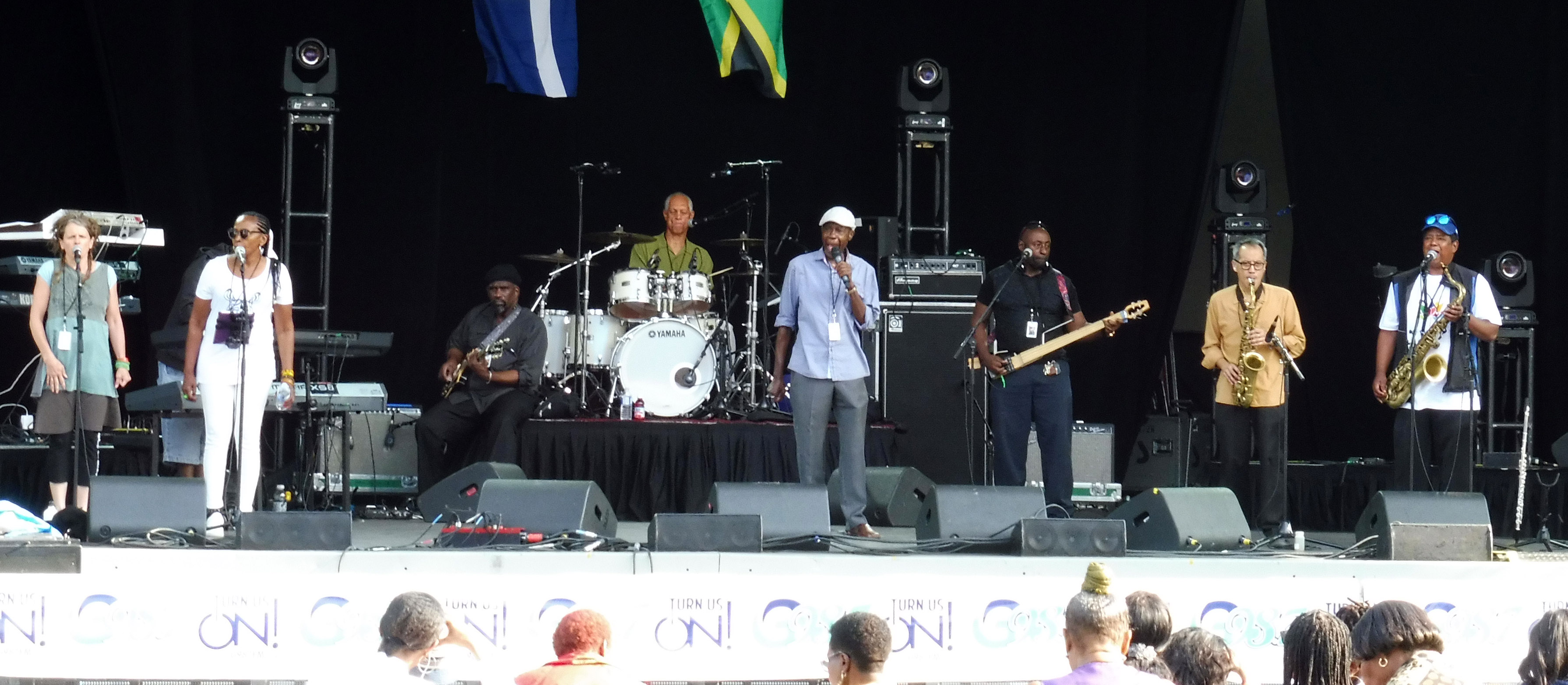
Marcia Griffiths and Jay Douglas performing at the Canadian National Exhibition bandshell, August 23, 2017.

Jay Douglas is a Canadian musician, based in Toronto. He is a long-time member of the Toronto music scene.

== Early life ==
Douglas was born in Jamaica. Douglas spent his childhood in Montego Bay, Jamaica, where he first performed. He moved to Toronto, Ontario to join his mother in 1963 when he was a teenager.

== Career ==
According to a 2012 profile in Now magazine, Douglas' first Canadian performances were at Toronto's Central Technical School, when he was a student there.

His first professional group was The Cougars, a funk band.

Since then, Douglas has performed steadily at clubs and festivals all over Ontario. He has performed at Toronto's Massey Hall, Roy Thompson Hall, and the Glenn Gould Studio. In 2012, his album Lovers' Paradise was one of that year's five Juno nominees for best reggae album.

Now described Douglas as a "treasure trove of Toronto-Jamaican musical history".

In 2012, Seattle-based Light in the Attic Records produced a retrospective on the arrival of reggae to North America that relied heavily on Douglas's performances, knowledge, and contacts. Matt Sullivan, a producer with Light in the Attic, called Douglas "one of the finest soul-reggae singers in North America". Errol Nazareth, writing in the Toronto Sun called it ironic that it required producers from Seattle to fully recognize the significance of Douglas's musical contributions.

On September 19, 2015, Douglas debuted a song entitled "Reggae Lane" at a concert to celebrate the completion of a 110 square metres (1,200 ft^{2}) mural celebrating the history of reggae at the recently renamed Reggae Lane.

Douglas was shortlisted for the 2020 Juno Awards, for Reggae Recording of the Year, for "Jah Children".
