= Kirk Diamond =

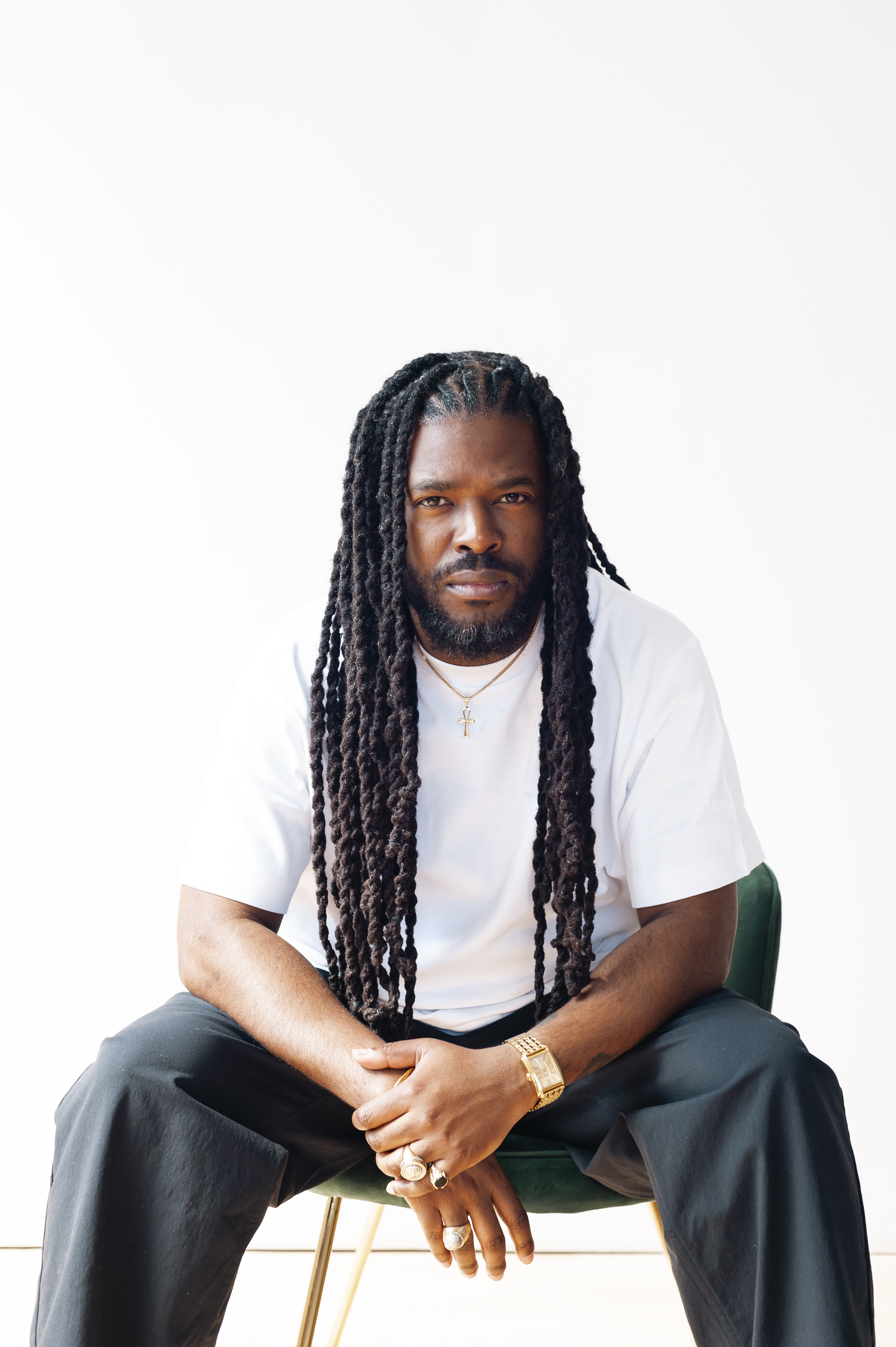
- Kirk Diamond, Jamaican-Canadian artist (2025)

Background information
- Born: Kirk Douglas; Spanish Town, Jamaica
- Origin: Brampton, Ontario, Canada
- Genres: Reggae, Dancehall, Hip Hop, Dub
- Occupation: Singer-Songwriter
- Instrument: Vocals
- Years active: 2014–present
- Label: The Movement Of Ahryel
- Website: kirkdiamondmusic.com

Kirk Douglas, better known by his stage name Kirk Diamond, is a Jamaican-Canadian reggae and dancehall singer-songwriter, producer and entrepreneur based in Brampton, Ontario.

== Early life ==
Kirk Diamond was born Kirk Douglas in Spanish Town, Jamaica, to Ricardo and Valerie Douglas. In the 1990s, at the age of ten, he immigrated to Canada with his family, settling in Toronto's Eglinton Avenue West neighbourhood, known as Little Jamaica. Growing up in this multicultural environment exposed him to a wide range of musical genres, including hip hop and rock, which later fused with his Jamaican roots in reggae and dancehall.

Diamond spent much of his early life listening to his father's collection of live reggae recordings and sound system sessions from Jamaica and the diaspora, helping shape his musical identity. His family later moved to Mississauga, where he attended The Valleys Middle School. There, he gave his first public performance singing Beenie Man's "Who Am I" for a music class presentation.

He went on to attend John Cabot Catholic Secondary School, where he focused on basketball and track and field. It was in his final year of high school that he began to seriously consider music as a career.

In recognition of his contributions to music and culture, Diamond was named a Distinguished Alumnus by the Dufferin-Peel Catholic District School Board.

== Music career ==
Kirk Diamond first gained recognition as a member of Don Dem, a Toronto-based dancehall group. The group attracted attention with remixes of songs such as Travie McCoy's "Billionaire" (featuring Bruno Mars). and Rick Ross's "B.M.F. (Blowin' Money Fast)". In 2010, Don Dem released the Loaded Mixtape exclusively on CD, helping to bring fresh energy to the Canadian dancehall scene.

In 2014, after embracing the spiritual and philosophical teachings of Rastafari, Diamond pursued a solo career focused on more conscious themes. His debut solo single, "Love Inna We Heart", produced by France-based Galang Records, earned him his first Juno Award nomination in 2015 for Reggae Recording of the Year.

In 2016, Diamond collaborated with Derrick Morgan to remake Morgan's 1960s hit "Conqueror". The following year, he teamed up with German producer Robin Hype to release his debut EP, Greater. To promote the project, Diamond embarked on a UK media tour, concluding with a freestyle performance on BBC 1Xtra with Seani B, which earned him international attention for his lyrical skill.

In 2018, Greater won the Juno Award for Reggae Recording of the Year. That year, Diamond and his band, The Movement of Ahryel, became one of Canada's most in-demand live reggae acts, performing over 70 shows and sharing stages with Third World and Maxi Priest.

In 2019, he began a collaboration with producer Finn, resulting in the album Dread, released in October 2023. During the pandemic, inspired by global protests against anti-Black racism, Diamond wrote "Let It Be Done", a socially conscious anthem that earned him a Juno nomination in 2021 for Reggae Recording of the Year.

From 2021 to 2024, Diamond received four consecutive Juno Award nominations for Reggae Recording of the Year:

- 2021 – "Let It Be Done"
- 2022 – "Too Ruff" (with Finn)
- 2023 – "Reggae Party" (with Finn, featuring Kairo McLean)
- 2024 – Dread (album)

He secured back-to-back wins in 2023 and 2024. In 2025, "Reggae Party" was named one of the 10 Best Canadian Reggae Songs of All Time by CBC Music.

In 2022, the City of Brampton honoured Diamond by renaming a local park "Kirk Diamond Park" in recognition of his artistic and community contributions.

In 2023, he won the USA Songwriting Competition for Best Children's Song with "Sonshine", in collaboration with Broccoli and Kairo McLean. That same year, more than five of his songs were featured in the Jamaican drama film When Morning Comes.

In 2024, Diamond released the single "Deh Yah", which explores the duality of growing up Jamaican in Canada and affirms his cultural roots and diasporic identity.
