= Carl Henry (singer) =

Canadian R&B singer

- Born: Jamaica
- Origin: Montreal, Quebec, Canada
- Genres: Contemporary R&B; dancehall
- Occupation: Singer
- Years active: 2002–present
- Website: carlhenry.ca

Carl Henry is a Canadian R&B singer born in Jamaica and raised in Montreal, Quebec, Canada. His 2002 debut album RNB, earned him his first Juno Award nomination in 2003 for Best R&B/Soul Recording of the Year. He released a French-language version of the album titled Solution RNB. After touring and promoting the French version the album, he released three singles: "Homie's Girl", dancehall hit "Bare as She Dare" (featuring Ce'cile), and "Hot Gal" (featuring Rally Bop). The three singles also received Juno nominations.

His second album, titled I Wish, was released in the fall of 2005. It featured the single "Little Mama". His song "Perfect" (featuring J.R. Writer) appeared in Ian Iqbal Rashid's 2007 feature film How She Move.

His third album is entitled All That I Know and features the hit singles "Trippin'" and "Dim the Lights".

== Discography ==
=== Albums ===
- 2003: RNB
- 2003: Solution RNB – French-language version of RNB
- 2005: I Wish

=== Singles ===
- "Homie's Girl"
- "Bare as She Dare" (featuring Ce'cile)
- "Hot Gal" (featuring Rally Bop)
- "Little Mama"
- "Dim the Lights"
