= Karina Gauvin =

Canadian soprano (born 1966)

Karina Gauvin (born 1966) is a Canadian soprano who has made several recordings and is especially recognised for her interpretation of Baroque music. Opera News stated that, "Gauvin knows how to rivet an audience in opera and concert. She has been a queen of Baroque opera for years. Her personality is big enough to dominate her elaborate wigs and costumes, and her soprano voice is like a clear, refreshing and inexhaustible spring that darts and sparkles around any ornamental obstacle in its way."

== Life and career ==
Born 1966 in Repentigny, Quebec Gauvin was the youngest of three children born to two both professionally trained opera singers who were never able to establish successful performance careers. With the encouragement of her mother, Lucie Gaudreau, she became a member of the Canadian Children's Opera Chorus at the age of 8. She sang in numerous concerts and operas with the chorus over the next eight years, including productions of Tosca and Wozzeck. As a teenager she began to study singing seriously with mezzo-soprano Catherine Robbin in Toronto. She moved with her family back to Montreal and shortly thereafter enrolled at McGill University where she majored in Art History. While there she sang in the university's chorus under conductor Nicole Paiement. Paiement convinced Gauvin to pursue a career as a singer, and she subsequently left McGill for the Conservatoire de musique du Québec à Montréal where she became a pupil of Marie Daveluy. She later studied in Glasgow with contralto Pamela Bowden at the Royal Scottish Academy of Music and Drama.

Gauvin made her professional opera debut with the Glimmerglass Opera. She won First Prize at the CBC Radio National Competition, and the Lieder Prize and the Public's Prize at the 's-Hertogenbosch International Vocal Competition (Holland, 1994). Other awards include the Virginia Parker Prize (Canada Council) and the Maggie Teyte Memorial Prize in London. She has sung in concerts with the Chicago Symphony, Les Violons du Roy, Los Angeles Philharmonic, Minnesota Orchestra, Montreal Symphony Orchestra, Orchestre Symphonique de Québec, Philadelphia Orchestra, Tafelmusik Baroque Orchestra and Toronto Symphony Orchestra among others.

Karina Gauvin is Mécénat Musica Artiste en résidence 2020–2023.

== Discography ==
Here is a list of albums and recordings featuring Karina Gauvin:

1. IMAGES DE NOËL — 1999
2. TAFELMUSIK — 1999
3. MESSIAH — 1999
4. FÊTE GALANTE — 1999
5. SAMUEL BARBER — 2000
6. APOLLO — 2000
7. COUPERIN CONCERT DANS LE GOÛT THÉATRAL — 2000
8. EXSULTATE JUBILATE — 2001
9. MOZART REQUIEM — 2001
10. CHANTS D’AUVERGNE — 2002
11. MAHLER 4 — 2003
12. ARIADNE — 2003
13. BELLE VOCI: KARINA GAUVIN — 2004
14. AGAR ET ISMAELE ESILIATI — 2004
15. VIVALDI, TITO MANLIO — 2005
16. HYVER — 2005
17. PURCELL — 2006
18. ALCINA HANDEL — 2007
19. LULLY PSYCHÉ — 2007
20. EZIO HANDEL — 2008
21. HAENDEL ARIAS — 2008
22. Vision Mahler – Symphony No. 2 in C Minor – 2008
23. BRITTEN: LES ILLUMINATIONS — 2009
24. PORPORA ARIAS — 2009
25. PSAUME 51 / CANTATE 82 — 2009
26. FARNACE VIVALDI — 2010
27. ARIODANTE HANDEL — 2010
28. HANDEL: STREAMS OF PLEASURE — 2011
29. GIULIO CESARE — 2012
30. MESSIAH — 2012
31. PRIMA DONNA — 2012
32. ALESSANDRO — 2012
33. OLYMPIADE — 2012
34. HANDEL ORLANDO – 2013
35. GIOVE IN ARGO — 2013
36. HAENDEL/TAMERLANO – 2014
37. MOZART ARIAS — 2014
38. Debussy: L’Enfant Prodigue, Ravel: L’Enfant et les sortileges – 2014
39. Bach : Matthäus-Passion – 2014
40. HANDEL : PARTENOPE – 2015
41. STEFFANI NIOBE, REGINA DI TEBE – 2015
42. OLIMPIE – 2016
43. Mozart: Don Giovanni – 2016
44. La Senna festeggiante de Vivaldi – 2017
45. Mendelssohn: Symphonies 1-5 – 2017
46. Clemence de Titus – 2017
47. DIVINE KARINA – 2017
48. Ascanio – 2018
49. Ascanio – 2018
50. NUITS BLANCHES – 2020
51. POULENC - STABAT MATER - 2024
52. MERCURE - CANTATE POUR UNE JOIE - 2024

Citations
