= Les Violons du Roy =

Chamber orchestra in Quebec City, Canada

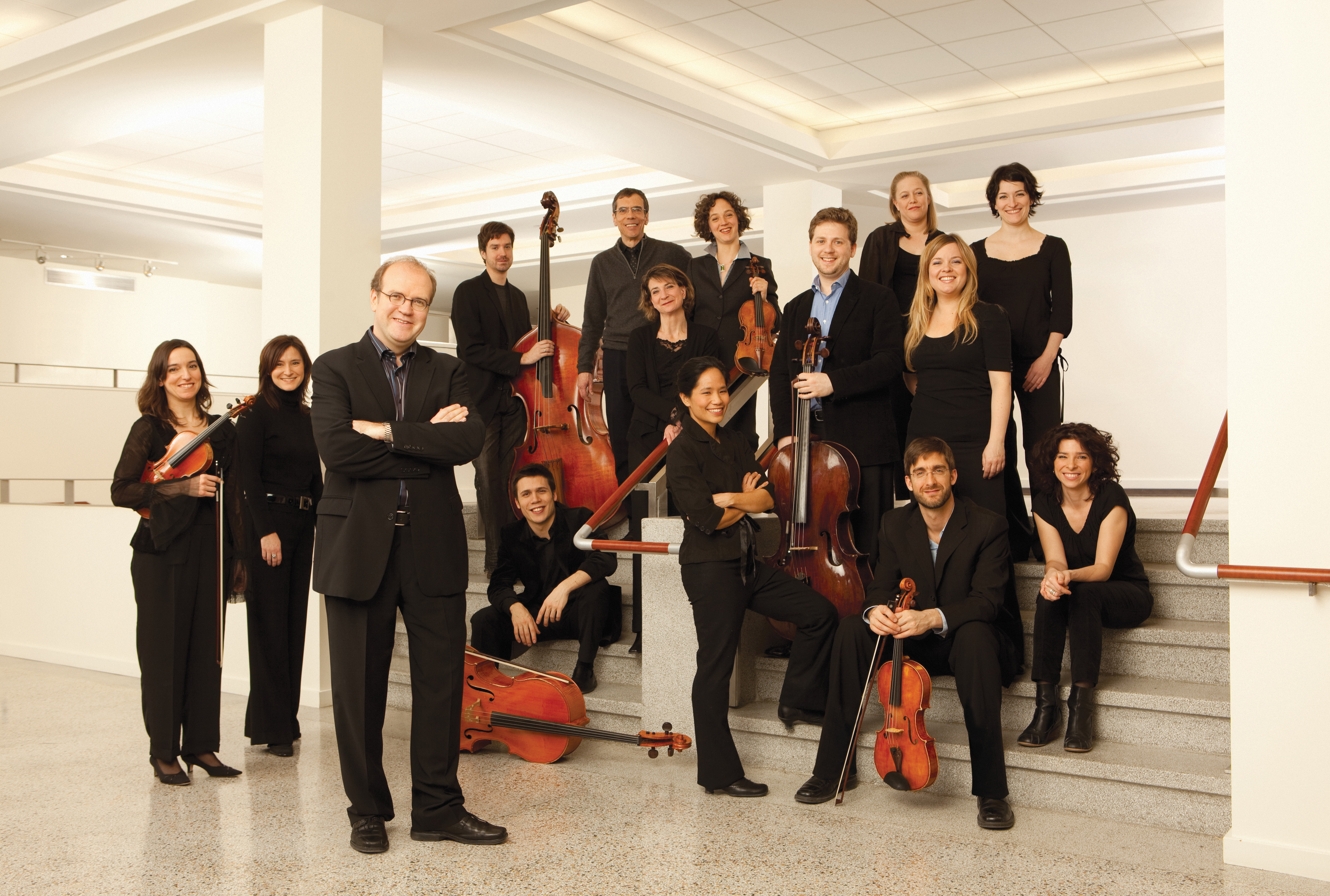
Bernard Labadie and Les Violons du Roy (2010)

Les Violons du Roy is a French-Canadian chamber orchestra based in Quebec City, Quebec. The orchestra's principal venue is the Palais Montcalm in Québec City. The orchestra also performs concerts in Montréal at the Place des Arts, the Montreal Museum of Fine Arts and St. James United Church.

== History ==
In 1984, Bernard Labadie founded the ensemble, following productions at the Université Laval of the Baroque operas Dido and Aeneas and L'incoronazione di Poppea, using the orchestra for these productions as the new ensemble's core. The ensemble's name is an adaptation of the 17th century French royal court orchestra Les Vingt-quatre Violons du Roi. Numbering 15 musicians, the orchestra performs on modern instruments, but incorporates period performance practice into its performances of music from the 17th and 18th centuries, including using duplicates of period bows for string instruments, and sparing use of vibrato. Labadie founded an affiliate chorus for Les Violons du Roy in 1985, under the original name of Ensemble vocal Bernard Labadie. In 1991, the choir changed its name to La Chapelle de Québec.

The ensemble first performed in Europe in 1988. Its first performance in Washington, D.C. was in 1995. The orchestra first appeared in New York City in August 1997.

Past conductors and musicians affiliated with the ensemble have included:

- Jean-Marie Zeitouni (past principal guest conductor)
- Eric Paetkau (former resident conductor)
- Mathieu Lussier (associate conductor)
- Anthony Marwood (principal artistic partner)

With the 2014–2015 season, Labadie's title with the orchestra changed from music director to "founding conductor". In October 2016, the orchestra announced the appointment of Jonathan Cohen as its music director, effective with the 2017–2018 season. In November 2022, the orchestra announced the appointment of Nicolas Ellis as its next principal guest conductor, effective with the 2023–2024 season.

In August 2025, the ensemble announced that Cohen had concluded his tenure as music director of Les Violons du Roy at the close of the 2024–2025 season and now has the title of Chef principal ('Principal director'). In October 2025, the ensemble announced the re-appointment of Labadie as its music director, effective with the 2026–2027 season.

The orchestra has recorded commercially for the Dorian, Virgin Classics, and ATMA Classique labels. The ensemble has won the Juno Award for Classical Album of the Year three times: for their recording of George Frideric Handel's Apollo e Dafne and Handel's Silete Venti in 2001, for their recording of Wolfgang Amadeus Mozart's Requiem in 2003, and in 2007 for their recording of Astor Piazzolla's Four Seasons.

== Music Directors ==
- Bernard Labadie (1984–2014)
- Jonathan Cohen (2017–2025)
- Bernard Labadie (2026–present)
