= Blessed (musician) =

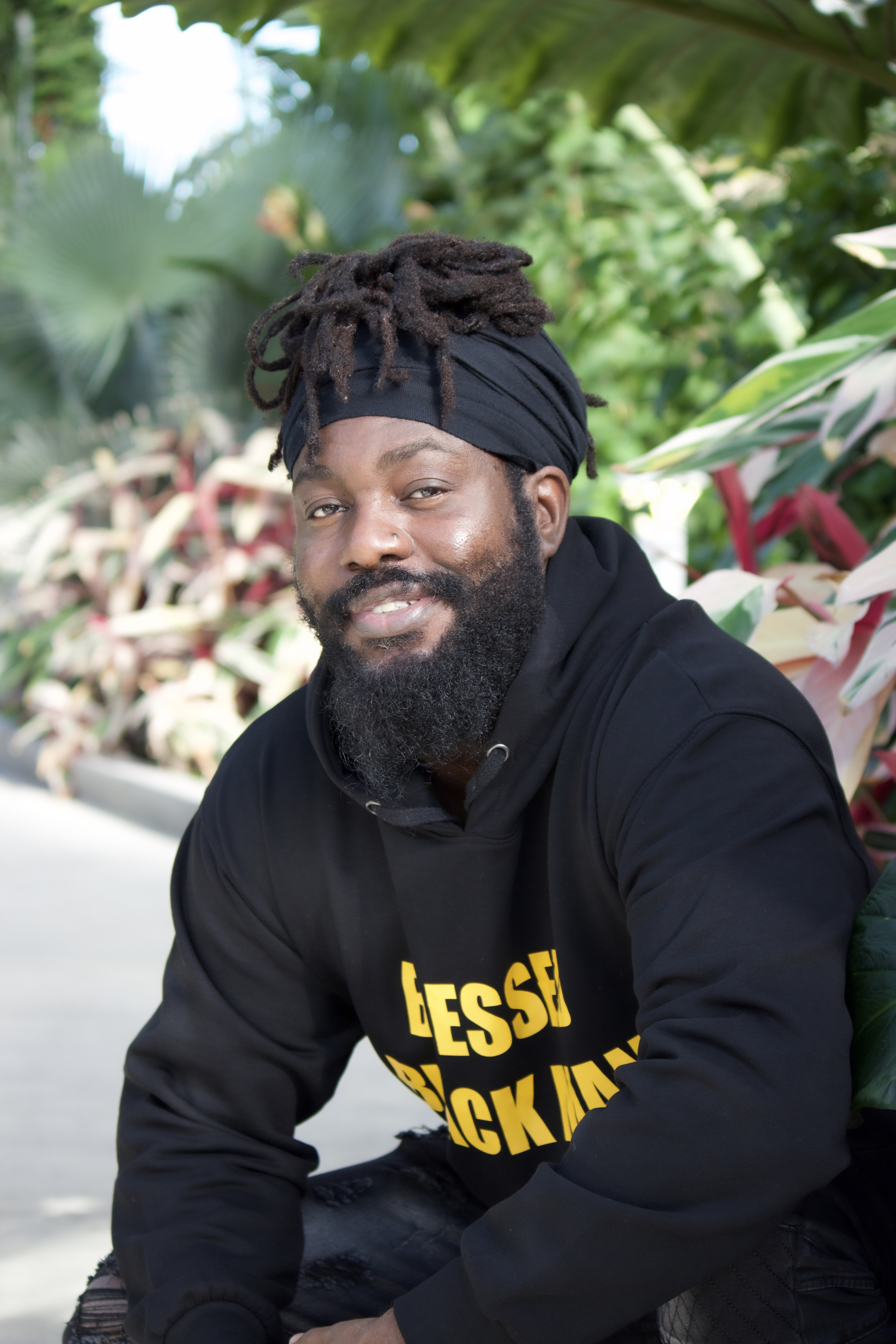
- Blessed

Background information
- Born: Peter John Skinner; 21 September 1976 (age 49)
- Origin: Saint Thomas Parish, Jamaica
- Genres: Reggae, dancehall, reggae fusion, roots reggae
- Occupations: Musician, Songwriter, deejay, Producer, Educator
- Years active: Late 2001–present
- Label: Iron Balloon Records
- Website: Blessed

Blessed is the stage name of Peter John Skinner, a Jamaican-Canadian reggae musician. He is most noted as a two-time Juno Award winner for Reggae Recording of the Year, winning at the Juno Awards of 2002 for "Love (African Woman)" and at the Juno Awards of 2006 for "Reggae Time".

Originally from Seaforth Town in Jamaica's Saint Thomas Parish, Skinner moved to Toronto, Ontario in the late 1980s, and began his musical career performing with the Redd Flames sound system. Most of his releases have been individual singles, although he has also released a full-length album and several mixtapes.

In addition to his two Juno Award wins, he has been nominated in the reggae category nine other times over the course of his career.

== Singles ==
Singles
Title	Release date	Label	Format
Rise and Shine	2014	Noble Work Ent	Digital single
Love (Natural African)	2017	Blessed	Digital single
Hold up Slow Down	2017	Peter Skinner	Digital single
Black Man	2020	Peter Skinner	Digital single
Care 4 you	2020	Glory Empire Recording Studio	Digital single
Black Man Remix	2021	Iron Balloon Records	Digital single
Herb Dream (Remix)	2021	Peter Pann Production	Digital single
Summa Gyal	2021	Iron Balloon Records	Digital single
What's It All For?	2021	Rastaboyz Society	Digital single
I Need You	2022	Dasvibes	Digital single
