= Jason Brando =

Canadian record producer and music executive

- Occupations: Record producer; songwriter; music executive
- Years active: 2015–present
- Organization: Cult Nation
- Known for: Founding Cult Nation, producing for Charlotte Cardin

Jason Brando is a Canadian record producer, songwriter, and music executive based in Montreal, Quebec. He is the founder and creative director of Cult Nation, an independent record label and talent management company. Brando is known for his long-term creative partnership with singer Charlotte Cardin, having co-written and produced her debut album Phoenix (2021) and sophomore album 99 Nights (2023). He received dual Juno Award nominations for Songwriter of the Year and Producer of the Year at the Juno Awards of 2024.

In 2025, Brando was named to the Billboard Canada Power Players list in the Managers to Watch category.

== Career ==
=== Cult Nation (2015–present) ===
Brando founded Cult Nation in Montreal in 2015. The company operates as both a record label and talent management agency, with Brando serving as Founder and Creative Director. According to Billboard Canada, Brando "is the lead for creative and strategy, which means both high-level career strategy and the music itself—leading collaborative writing and production with a global circle of songwriters and producers."

The label's first major release was Charlotte Cardin's debut EP Big Boy in 2016, which Brando mixed and played bass on. The EP garnered over 10 million streams each on singles "Dirty Dirty" and "Like It Doesn't Hurt."

Under Brando's leadership, Cult Nation has developed artists including Charlotte Cardin, Lubalin, Alicia Moffet, Chiara Savasta, and Dominique Way. In partnership with Sony Music Canada, the label's artists have achieved international recognition, with Cardin becoming the first Canadian artist to top the Canadian Billboard chart since Céline Dion in 2016.

=== Work with Charlotte Cardin ===
==== Phoenix (2021) ====
Cardin's debut album Phoenix marked a turning point in her creative process. According to Cardin, she had previously written songs in isolation, but felt stuck when beginning work on her full-length debut. She enlisted Brando as her primary co-writing partner. "It was just super natural to write together," Cardin said in an interview with CBC Music, "and we're like, 'Why did we never do this before?'"

In an interview with Hypebae, Cardin further described the collaboration: "I started co-writing with my producer Jason [Brando] and really disciplined myself to seek inspiration instead of waiting for it to magically appear." The album was co-written with Brando, with Brando serving as executive producer alongside Laurie Chouinard.

Brando co-wrote and produced several tracks on the album, including the lead single "Passive Aggressive" (co-produced with Marc-André Gilbert and Connor Seidel) and "Daddy" (co-produced with Marc-André Gilbert). Brando also co-directed the music video for "Passive Aggressive" alongside Cardin.

Phoenix won four Juno Awards at the Juno Awards of 2022, including Album of the Year and Artist of the Year for Cardin, and won the Félix Award for Anglophone Album of the Year at the 43rd Félix Awards.

==== 99 Nights (2023) ====
Brando continued his role as a primary collaborator on Cardin's second album, 99 Nights (2023), serving as executive producer and co-writing and co-producing numerous songs. According to CBC Music, Brando "was integral to Cardin's track 'Jim Carrey,' as he shared [Jim] Carrey's inspirational speeches with her, leading to her penning the song about marrying the actor to break free of her ego."

The album won the Juno Awards for Album of the Year and Pop Album of the Year at the Juno Awards of 2024 and was shortlisted for the 2024 Polaris Music Prize. For their work on the album, Brando and Lubalin received dual nominations for Songwriter of the Year (for "Confetti," "Daddy's a Psycho," and "Jim Carrey") and Producer of the Year at the 2024 Junos.

=== Other productions ===
In 2025, singer Alicia Moffet joined Cult Nation and released her album No, I'm Not Crying, which was created in collaboration with Brando alongside producers Sam Avant and Harper Gordon.

== Discography ==
=== As producer ===
Year	Artist	Album	Role
2016	Charlotte Cardin	Big Boy	Mixer, bass
2017	Charlotte Cardin	Main Girl	Producer (select tracks)
2021	Charlotte Cardin	Phoenix	Executive producer, co-writer, producer
2023	Charlotte Cardin	99 Nights	Executive producer, co-writer, producer
2025	Alicia Moffet	No, I'm Not Crying	Co-producer, co-writer

== As director ==
Year	Artist	Song	Notes
2020	Charlotte Cardin	"Passive Aggressive"	Co-directed with Charlotte Cardin
2025	Charlotte Cardin	Tant Pis Pour Elle	-

== Awards and nominations ==
Year	Award	Category	Work	Result
2024	Juno Awards	Songwriter of the Year	"Confetti," "Daddy's a Psycho," "Jim Carrey" (with Charlotte Cardin and Lubalin)	Nominated
2024	Juno Awards	Producer of the Year	99 Nights	Nominated
