= Phoenix (Charlotte Cardin album) =

Studio album by Charlotte Cardin
- Released: April 23, 2021
- Genre: Pop
- Length: 45:47
- Label: Cult Nation
- Producers: Jason Brando; Marc-André Gilbert; Lubalin; Connor Seidel; OCLAIR; Mr Hudson; Gael Auclair; Stint; Johnny Goldstein; Ken & Ryu

Charlotte Cardin chronology
Main Girl (2017)	Phoenix (2021)	99 Nights (2023)

Singles from Phoenix
- 1. "Passive Aggressive" Released: September 18, 2020; 2. "Daddy" Released: January 13, 2021; 3. "Meaningless" Released: February 12, 2021

Phoenix is the debut studio album by Canadian pop singer Charlotte Cardin, released on April 23, 2021, through Cult Nation.

== Background and release ==
According to Cardin, the album's creation was marked by a significant shift from her usual songwriting process. While she had generally written the songs on her prior EPs Big Boy and Main Girl on her own, when she began writing for Phoenix she felt limited by writer's block and a lack of certainty about what she wanted to say or how she wanted the album to sound, and began cowriting with Cult Nation head Jason Brando. The album had actually been completed and planned for release in 2020, but was delayed until 2021 due to the COVID-19 pandemic in Canada, on the grounds that "nobody really had the headspace or even the media space to talk about music", such that the album would likely have been lost and overlooked had it been released in 2020. However, the singles "Passive Aggressive" and "Daddy" were both released in 2020, and "Meaningless" followed in 2021, in advance of the full album's release.

The track "XOXO", an apparent duet between Cardin and a male vocalist, was in fact sung entirely by Cardin; due to a production error, her first take of the song was recorded at too high a pitch, but she and the producers decided to experiment with adjusting the tape in advance of recording a second take, and found that they really liked the soulful effect that the downpitched version imparted to the song. Cardin also later recorded a French-language version of "XOXO" for the Spotify Singles series, using the same vocal downpitch technique to replicate the duet. When performing the song in concert, Cardin performs only the female vocals live, with the male vocals prerecorded and "sung" by an animated dove on a screen behind her.

With full concert touring still impacted by the pandemic, the album was promoted with a livestreamed concert performance, titled The Phoenix Experience, on April 29.

In November 2021 Cardin released a "deluxe edition" of the album, featuring several additional bonus tracks not on the original release.

== Commercial performance ==
The album debuted at number one on the Canadian Albums Chart, and remained there for two weeks.

== Critical reception ==
Heather Taylor-Singh of Exclaim! praised the album, writing that "Phoenix feels like an album for the modern young woman. At 26, Cardin effortlessly captures the complicated nature of trying to understand who she is and what she wants...Cardin is good at the buildup, quietly singing about her insecurities and how past lovers have done her wrong, as the instrumentals slowly simmer. But when the beat drops, you can't help but nod your head and dance to oscillating synth beats as the passion in Cardin's voice intensifies, like on 'Passive Aggressive'. With thoughtfully constructed instrumentals, her voice is powerful."

== Awards ==
The album was longlisted for the 2021 Polaris Music Prize, and won the Felix Award for Anglophone Album of the Year at the 43rd Félix Awards. Cardin also won the awards for Anglophone Concert of the Year for The Phoenix Experience, and Most Successful Artist Outside Quebec.

The album won two Juno Awards at the Juno Awards of 2022, for Album of the Year and Pop Album of the Year. "Meaningless" won for Single of the Year, Cardin won Artist of the Year, and the song's video by Norman Wong was a nominee for Video of the Year.

== Track listing ==
No.	Title	Writer(s)	Producer(s)	Length
1.	"Phoenix"	Charlotte Cardin; Jason Brando; Lubalin	Jason Brando; Marc-André Gilbert; Lubalin	3:48
2.	"Passive Aggressive"	Cardin; Brando; Marc-André Gilbert; Connor Seidel	Brando; Gilbert; Connor Seidel	3:10
3.	"Anyone Who Loves Me"	Cardin; Brando; Gilbert; OCLAIR	Brando; Gilbert	3:57
4.	"Meaningless"	Cardin; Brando; Gilbert	Brando; Gilbert; OCLAIR; Seidel	3:38
5.	"Daddy"	Cardin; Brando; Gilbert; Marco Royal Nicodemo; Mathieu Sénéchal	Brando; Gilbert	2:50
6.	"Sex to Me"	Cardin; Brando	Brando; Gilbert	3:36
7.	"Good Girl"	Cardin	Brando; Gilbert; Seidel	2:39
8.	"Sad Girl"	Cardin; Brando; Gilbert	Brando; Gilbert	3:16
9.	"XOXO"	Cardin; Brando; Seidel	Brando; Gilbert; Seidel	3:47
10.	"Oceans"	Cardin; Brando; Gilbert	Brando; Gilbert	3:29
11.	"Sun Goes Down (Buddy)"	Cardin; Brando	Brando; Gilbert	3:39
12.	"Romeo"	Cardin; Brando; Gilbert	Brando; Gilbert	3:44
13.	"Je quitte"	Cardin; Gilbert; Benjamin 'Mr Hudson' McIldowie	Brando; Gilbert; Mr Hudson	4:16
Total length:				45:47

Deluxe edition
No.	Title	Writer(s)	Producer(s)	Length
14.	"Scorpio Season"	Cardin; Brando; Ajay Bhattacharyya	Stint	3:05
15.	"You Lie, You Die"	Cardin; Brando; Gilbert; Gael Auclair	Brando; Gilbert; Gael Auclair	2:30
16.	"Changing"	Cardin; Brando	Brando; Gilbert	2:37
17.	"Over Me"	Cardin; Brando; Seidel	Seidel	2:16
18.	"Passive Aggressive" (Johnny GOLD Remix)	Cardin; Brando; Gilbert; Seidel; Yonatan "Johnny" Goldstein	Brando; Gilbert; Seidel; Johnny Goldstein	2:51
19.	"C'est la vie" (with Dinos)	Cardin; Jules "Dinos" Jomby	Ken & Ryu	2:43
20.	"Phoenix (Reprise)" (with Lubalin)	Cardin; Brando; Lubalin	Brando; Gilbert; Lubalin	3:39

Adapted from Spotify credits.

== Charts ==
Chart performance for Phoenix
Chart (2021)	Peak position
Belgian Albums (Ultratop Wallonia)	23
Canadian Albums (Billboard)	1
French Albums (SNEP)	26
Swiss Albums (Schweizer Hitparade)	30

== Certifications ==
Certifications for Phoenix
Region	Certification	Certified units/sales
Canada (Music Canada)	2× Platinum	160,000^{‡}
France (SNEP)	Gold	50,000^{‡}
^{‡} Sales+streaming figures based on certification alone.
