= Juno Award for Album of the Year =

Canadian music award

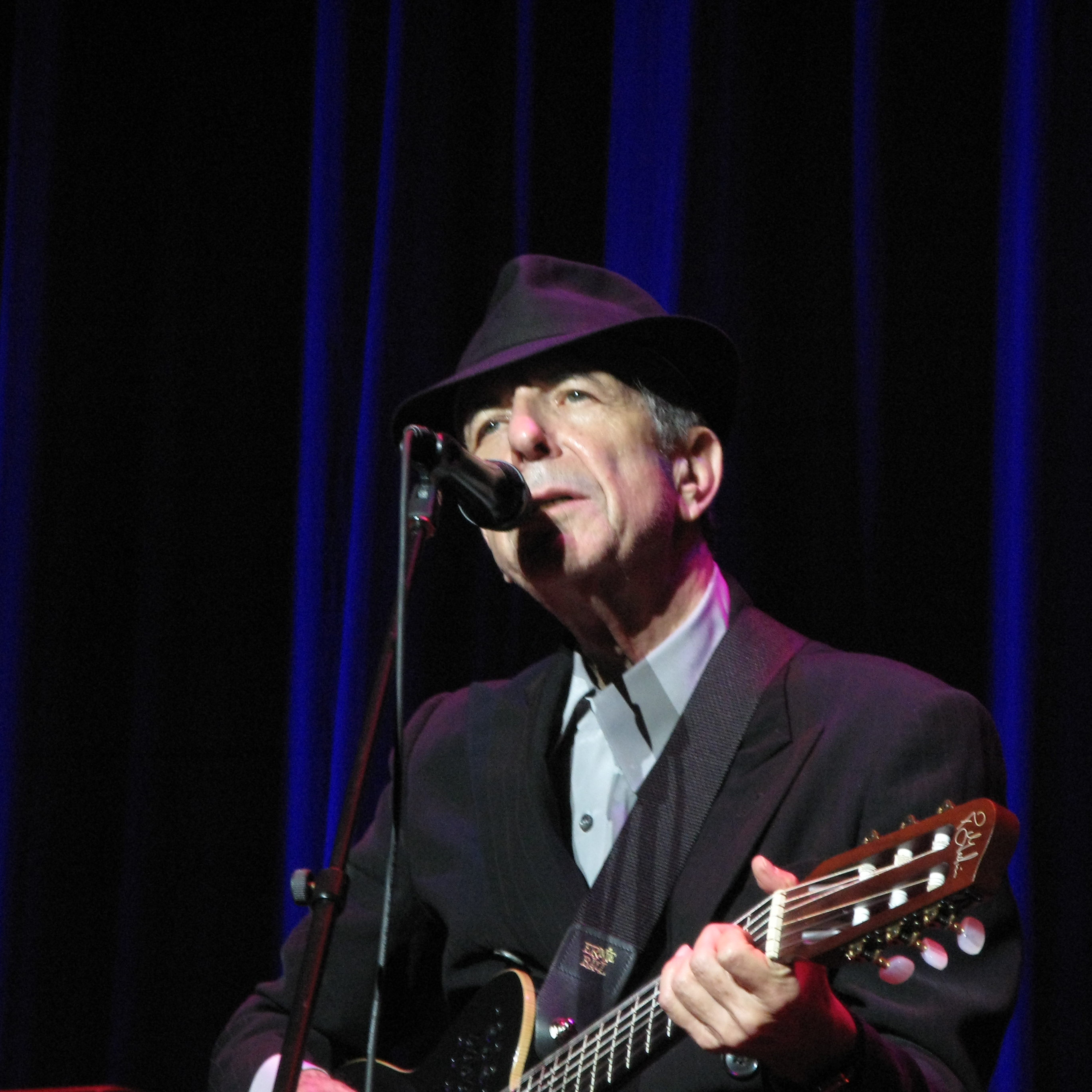
Singer Leonard Cohen received this award in 2015 and 2017.

The Juno Award for Album of the Year is an annual award presented by the Canadian Academy of Recording Arts and Sciences for the best album released in Canada. It has been awarded since 1975, though it was the award for Best Selling Album from 1975 to 1979. From 1999 to 2002, it was awarded under the name of Best Album. The award goes to the artist.

== Achievements ==
Arcade Fire, Celine Dion, Michael Bublé and The Weeknd are the artists with the most wins in this category with three each; Dion is the most nominated artist with 12 nominations.

== Recipients ==
=== Album awards of 1974 ===
At the Juno Awards of 1974, no single prize was awarded for best album, but three artists were each awarded for albums in different categories.

Year	Award	Winner	Album	Ref.
1974	Contemporary Album of the Year	Bachman–Turner Overdrive	Bachman–Turner Overdrive	
1974	Country Album of the Year	Stompin' Tom Connors	To It and At It	
1974	Pop Music Album of the Year	Anne Murray	Danny's Song	

=== Best Selling Album (1975–1979) ===
Year	Winner	Album	Nominees	Ref.
1975	Bachman–Turner Overdrive	Not Fragile	Love Song – Anne Murray; Anka – Paul Anka; Best of The Guess Who, Volume 2 – The Guess Who	
1976	Bachman–Turner Overdrive	Four Wheel Drive	Stand Back – April Wine; Beau Dommage – Beau Dommage; Les cinq saisons – Harmonium; Feelings – Paul Anka	
1977	André Gagnon	Neiges	Best of B.T.O. (So Far) – Bachman–Turner Overdrive; Head On – Bachman–Turner Overdrive; Stand Tall – Burton Cummings; Summertime Dream – Gordon Lightfoot; Dreamboat Annie – Heart	
1978	Dan Hill	Longer Fuse	Le Saint Laurent – André Gagnon; My Own Way to Rock – Burton Cummings; A Farewell to Kings – Rush; The Best of The Stampeders – The Stampeders	
1979	Burton Cummings	Dream of a Child	20 Country Classics – Carroll Baker; Endless Wire – Gordon Lightfoot; Hemispheres – Rush; Thick as Thieves – Trooper	

=== Album of the Year (1980–1998) ===
Year	Winner	Album	Nominees	Ref.
1980	Anne Murray	New Kind of Feeling	Armageddon – Prism; Hemispheres – Rush; Flying Colors – Trooper; Hot Shots – Trooper	
1981	Anne Murray	Anne Murray's Greatest Hits	Woman Love – Burton Cummings; Uncut – Powder Blues Band; Young and Restless – Prism; Permanent Waves – Rush	
1982	Loverboy	Loverboy	The Nature of the Beast – April Wine; The Great White North – Bob and Doug McKenzie; Exit...Stage Left – Rush; Moving Pictures – Rush	
1983	Loverboy	Get Lucky	Aldo Nova – Aldo Nova; Christmas Wishes – Anne Murray; Turn It Loud – Headpins; Signals – Rush	
1984	Bryan Adams	Cuts Like a Knife	Keep It Up – Loverboy; Hammer on a Drum – Payolas; Neruda – Red Rider; Grace Under Pressure – Rush	
1985	Bryan Adams	Reckless	Boy in the Box – Corey Hart; Black Cars – Gino Vannelli; Strange Animal – Gowan; Walkin' the Razor's Edge – Helix; Honeymoon Suite – Honeymoon Suite	
1986	Glass Tiger	The Thin Red Line	The Big Prize – Honeymoon Suite; Lovin' Every Minute of It – Loverboy; Alien Shores – Platinum Blonde; Power Windows – Rush	
1987	Kim Mitchell	Shakin' Like a Human Being	Into the Fire – Bryan Adams; Fields of Fire – Corey Hart; Great Dirty World – Gowan; Between the Earth & Sky – Luba	
No award ceremony was held in 1988
1989	Robbie Robertson	Robbie Robertson	Outskirts – Blue Rodeo; Diamond Sun – Glass Tiger; Racing After Midnight – Honeymoon Suite; Reasons to Believe – Rita MacNeil	
1990	Alannah Myles	Alannah Myles	Rita – Rita MacNeil; Now the Bell Rings – Rita MacNeil; See the Light – The Jeff Healey Band; Victory Day – Tom Cochrane and Red Rider	
1991	Céline Dion	Unison	Bodyrock – Lee Aaron; Les B.B. – Les B.B.; Home I'll Be – Rita MacNeil; Hell to Pay – The Jeff Healey Band	
1992	Tom Cochrane	Mad Mad World	Waking Up the Neighbours – Bryan Adams; Highlights from Andrew Lloyd Webber's The Phantom of the Opera – the original Canadian cast; The Ghosts That Haunt Me – Crash Test Dummies; Road Apples – The Tragically Hip	
1993	k.d. lang	Ingénue	Gordon – Barenaked Ladies; Lost Together – Blue Rodeo; Celine Dion – Celine Dion; Fully Completely – The Tragically Hip	
1994	Neil Young	Harvest Moon	Rockinghorse – Alannah Myles; The Future – Leonard Cohen; I'll Always Be There – Roch Voisine; 12 Inches of Snow – Snow	
1995	Celine Dion	The Colour of My Love	Five Days in July – Blue Rodeo; Fumbling Towards Ecstasy – Sarah McLachlan; North Country – The Rankin Family; Day for Night – The Tragically Hip	
1996	Alanis Morissette	Jagged Little Pill	D'eux – Celine Dion; The Woman in Me – Shania Twain; This Child – Susan Aglukark; Ragged Ass Road – Tom Cochrane	
1997	The Tragically Hip	Trouble at the Henhouse	Amanda Marshall – Amanda Marshall; Hi™ How Are You Today? – Ashley MacIsaac; 18 til I Die – Bryan Adams; Falling into You – Celine Dion	
1998	Sarah McLachlan	Surfacing	Creature – Moist; Clumsy – Our Lady Peace; Kissing Rain – Roch Voisine; Come On Over – Shania Twain	

=== Best Album (1999–2002) ===
Year	Winner	Album	Nominees	Ref.
1999	Celine Dion	Let's Talk About Love	Happy? – Jann Arden; Grand parleur, petit faiseur – Kevin Parent; The Book of Secrets – Loreena McKennitt; Phantom Power – The Tragically Hip	
2000	Alanis Morissette	Supposed Former Infatuation Junkie	Tuesday's Child – Amanda Marshall; On a Day Like Today – Bryan Adams; These Are Special Times – Celine Dion; Hot Show – Prozzäk	
2001	Barenaked Ladies	Maroon	Beautiful Midnight – Matthew Good Band; Happiness...Is Not a Fish That You Can Catch – Our Lady Peace; No One Does It Better – soulDecision; Music @ Work – The Tragically Hip	
2002	Diana Krall	The Look of Love	Whoa, Nelly! – Nelly Furtado; Silver Side Up – Nickelback; Spiritual Machines – Our Lady Peace; All Killer No Filler – Sum 41	

=== Album of the Year (2003–present) ===
Year	Winner	Album	Nominees	Ref.
2003	Avril Lavigne	Let Go	A New Day Has Come – Celine Dion; Rêver mieux – Daniel Belanger; Gravity – Our Lady Peace; Up! – Shania Twain	
2004	Sam Roberts	We Were Born in a Flame	One Heart – Celine Dion; Michael Bublé – Michael Bublé; Folklore – Nelly Furtado; Afterglow – Sarah McLachlan	
2005	Billy Talent	Billy Talent	Under My Skin – Avril Lavigne; Miracle – Celine Dion; The Girl in the Other Room – Diana Krall; Still Not Getting Any – Simple Plan	
2006	Michael Bublé	It's Time	Christmas Songs – Diana Krall; 219 Days – Kalan Porter; All the Right Reasons – Nickelback; Under the Lights – Rex Goudie	
2007	Nelly Furtado	Loose	Billy Talent II – Billy Talent; I Think of You – Gregory Charles; Hedley – Hedley; One-X – Three Days Grace	
2008	Feist	The Reminder	Anne Murray Duets: Friends & Legends – Anne Murray; The Best Damn Thing – Avril Lavigne; D'elles – Celine Dion; Taking Chances – Celine Dion; Call Me Irresponsible (album) – Michael Bublé	
2009	Nickelback	Dark Horse	Famous Last Words – Hedley; Simple Plan – Simple Plan; 70s Volume 2 – Sylvain Cossette; Lost in the 80s – The Lost Fingers	
2010	Michael Bublé	Crazy Love	Billy Talent III – Billy Talent; Quiet Nights – Diana Krall; Dance with Me – Johnny Reid; My World – Justin Bieber	
2011	Arcade Fire	The Suburbs	Thank Me Later – Drake; The Show Must Go – Hedley; A Place Called Love – Johnny Reid; My World 2.0 – Justin Bieber	
2012	Michael Bublé	Christmas	Goodbye Lullaby – Avril Lavigne; Take Care – Drake; Under the Mistletoe – Justin Bieber; Here and Now – Nickelback	
2013	Carly Rae Jepsen	Kiss	Believe – Justin Bieber; Sans attendre – Céline Dion; Storms – Hedley; Ever After – Marianas Trench	
2014	Arcade Fire	Reflektor	Loved Me Back to Life – Celine Dion; Nothing Was the Same – Drake; To Be Loved – Michael Bublé; Harmony – Serena Ryder	
2015	Leonard Cohen	Popular Problems	Where I Belong – Bobby Bazini; Wild Life – Hedley; No Fixed Address – Nickelback; Serge Fiori – Serge Fiori	
2016	The Weeknd	Beauty Behind the Madness	If You're Reading This It's Too Late – Drake; À Paradis City – Jean Leloup; Purpose – Justin Bieber; Handwritten – Shawn Mendes	
2017	Leonard Cohen	You Want It Darker	Starboy – The Weeknd; Illuminate – Shawn Mendes; Views – Drake; Encore un Soir – Céline Dion	
2018	Arcade Fire	Everything Now	Revival – Johnny Reid; Nobody But Me – Michael Bublé; Safe Haven – Ruth B; Now – Shania Twain	
2019	Shawn Mendes	Shawn Mendes	These Are the Days — Jann Arden; Darlène — Hubert Lenoir; My Dear Melancholy, — The Weeknd; Outsider — Three Days Grace	
2020	Alessia Cara	The Pains of Growing	Shine a Light — Bryan Adams; Love — Michael Bublé; Bad Habits — Nav; Inscape — Alexandra Stréliski	
2021	The Weeknd	After Hours	Changes — Justin Bieber; Courage — Céline Dion; Thanks for the Dance — Leonard Cohen; You — Ali Gatie	
2022	Charlotte Cardin	Phoenix	Dangerous Levels of Introspection — JP Saxe; Justice — Justin Bieber; Too Young to Be Sad — Tate McRae; Wonder — Shawn Mendes	
2023	The Weeknd	Dawn FM	Who Hurt You? - Ali Gatie; Love Sux - Avril Lavigne; I Used to Think I Could Fly - Tate McRae; Demons Protected by Angels - Nav	
2024	Charlotte Cardin	99 Nights	Never Enough - Daniel Caesar; Mirror - Lauren Spencer-Smith; Néo-Romance - Alexandra Stréliski; Lord of the Flies & Birds & Bees - TALK	
2025	Tate McRae	Think Later	Roxane Bruneau, Submergé; Elisapie, Inuktitut; Josh Ross, Complicated; Sukha, Undisputed	
2026	Tate McRae	So Close to What	Justin Bieber, Swag II; Josh Ross, Later Tonight; The Weeknd, Hurry Up Tomorrow; Cameron Whitcomb, The Hard Way	

== See also ==
- Music of Canada
