= Norman Wong =

Norman Wong may refer to:

- Norman Wong (writer), American writer and activist
- Norman Wong (photographer) Canadian photographer and music video director
