= Juno Awards of 2024 =

Canadian music awards ceremony

- The Juno Awards Logo
- Date: 24 March 2024
- Location: Scotiabank Centre; Halifax, Nova Scotia
- Hosted by: Nelly Furtado

Highlights
- Most awards: Charlotte Cardin, Tate McRae, Aysanabee, Shawn Everett, TOBi, The Beaches (2)
- Most nominations: Charlotte Cardin (6)
- Website: junoawards.ca

Television/radio coverage
- Network: CBC; CBC Gem

The Juno Awards of 2024 were held on 24 March 2024, at Scotiabank Centre in Halifax, Nova Scotia, to honour achievements in Canadian music in 2023. It recognized the best recordings, compositions, and artists of the eligibility year determined by the members of the Canadian Academy of Recording Arts and Sciences. The ceremony was hosted by Nelly Furtado.

Charlotte Cardin was the leading nominee with six nominations while Talk and Daniel Caesar had five each.

== Performers ==
Performers included Furtado, Charlotte Cardin, Talk, Josh Ross and Karan Aujla, as well as a joint performance by Elisapie and Jeremy Dutcher, a posthumous tribute to Canadian musical icons Gordon Lightfoot and Robbie Robertson by singer-songwriters Allison Russell and Aysanabee, and a posthumous tribute to Karl Tremblay by Alexandra Stréliski.

List of performers at the 2024 Junos ceremony
Artist(s)	Song(s)
Nelly Furtado	"Say It Right" "Maneater" "Promiscuous" "Eat Your Man" "Give It to Me" "I'm Like a Bird"
Karan Aujla Ikky	"Admirin' You" "Softly"
Jeremy Dutcher Elisapie Morgan Toney	"Honor Song" "Skicinuwihkuk" "Uummati Attanarsimat"
TALK	"Run Away to Mars" "A Little Bit Happy"
Charlotte Cardin	"Confetti"
Alexandra Stréliski Allison Russell Aysanabee Julian Taylor Logan Staats Shawnee Kish William Prince In memoriam of Karl Tremblay, Gordon Lightfoot, and Robbie Robertson	"Les Étoiles filantes" "If You Could Read My Mind" "The Weight"
Josh Ross	"Trouble" "Single Again"
Maestro Fresh Wes Canadian Music Hall of Fame performance presented by TD	"Beethoven's Fifth" "Underestimated" "Stick to Your Vision" "Conducting Thangs" "Let Your Backbone Slide"
The Beaches	"Blame Brett"

== Winners and nominees ==
The following are the winners and nominees of the Juno Awards of 2024. Winners appear first and highlighted in bold.

=== People ===
Artist of the Year	Group of the Year
**Tate McRae**; Charlotte Cardin; Daniel Caesar; Lauren Spencer-Smith; Shania Twain	**The Beaches**; Arkells; Loud Luxury; Nickelback; Walk Off the Earth
Breakthrough Artist of the Year	Breakthrough Group of the Year
**Talk**; Karan Aujla; Connor Price; Lu Kala; Shubh	**New West**; Busty and the Bass; Crash Adams; Good Kid; Men I Trust
Fan Choice Award	Songwriter of the Year
**Karan Aujla**; Charlotte Cardin; Daniel Caesar; DVBBS; Josh Ross; Shubh; Tate McRae; The Weeknd; ThxSoMch; Walk Off the Earth	**Aysanabee — "Alone", "Here and Now", "Somebody Else"**; Charlotte Cardin, Jason Brando, Lubalin — "Confetti", "Daddy's a Psycho", "Jim Carrey"; Nicholas Durocher, Connor Riddell — "Afraid of the Dark", "A Little Bit Happy", "Wasteland"; William Prince — "Broken Heart of Mine", "Easier and Harder", "When You Miss Someone"; Allison Russell — "Eve Was Black", "Stay Right Here", "The Returner"
Producer of the Year	Recording Engineer of the Year
**Shawn Everett — "Used to Be Young" (Miley Cyrus), "What Now" (Brittany Howard)**; Jason Brando, Lubalin, Mathieu Sénéchal, Sam Avant — "Confetti", "Jim Carrey" (Charlotte Cardin); Hill Kourkoutis — "Ego Death" (Aysanabee), "Whiskey Bar" (Tafari Anthony); Joel Stouffer — "Breaking Up with Jesus", "Whitney" (Rêve); Wondagurl — "Circus Maximus", "Hyaena" (Travis Scott)	**Shawn Everett — "Used to Be Young" (Miley Cyrus), "What Now" (Brittany Howard)**; Serban Ghenea — "Anti-Hero" (Taylor Swift), "Paint the Town Red" (Doja Cat); Matty Green — "because of you" (Chris LaRocca), "Midnight Dreams" (Ellie Goulding); George Seara — "Everything Belongs", "The Promise Is the Same" (Cory Asbury); Denis Tougas — "Dawgcatcher", "Special" (Amanda Marshall)

=== Albums ===
Album of the Year	Adult Alternative Album of the Year
**Charlotte Cardin, 99 Nights**; Daniel Caesar, Never Enough; Lauren Spencer-Smith, Mirror; Alexandra Stréliski, Néo-Romance; Talk, Lord of the Flies & Birds & Bees	**Feist, Multitudes**; Begonia, Powder Blue; Jeremy Dutcher, Motewolonuwok; Hayden, Are We Good; Shawnee Kish, Revolution
Adult Contemporary Album of the Year	Alternative Album of the Year
**Amanda Marshall, Heavy Lifting**; Banners, I Wish I Was Flawless, I'm Not; Luca Fogale, Run Where the Light Calls; Steph La Rochelle, Wildflower; Josh Sahunta, To Be Loved, Vol. 1	**Aysanabee, Here and Now**; Dizzy, Dizzy; Leith Ross, To Learn; Softcult, See You in the Dark; Talk, Lord of the Flies & Birds & Bees
Blues Album of the Year	Children's Album of the Year
**Blue Moon Marquee, Scream, Holler & Howl**; Matt Andersen, The Big Bottle of Joy; Blackburn Brothers, Soulfunkn'blues; Michael Jerome Browne, Gettin' Together; Brandon Isaak, One Step Closer	**The Swinging Belles, Welcome to the Flea Circus**; ABC Singsong, Big Words; Ginalina, Going Back: Remembered and Remixed Family Folk Songs, Vol. 1; Splash'N Boots, Love-a-By; Young Maestro, Maestro Fresh Wes Presents: Young Maestro Stick to Your Vision for Young Athletes
Classical Album of the Year – Solo	Classical Album of the Year – Large Ensemble
**James Ehnes, Nielsen: Violin Concerto, Symphony No. 4**; Barbara Hannigan, Infinite Voyage; Matt Haimovitz, De Hartmann: Cello Concerto; Marc-André Hamelin, Fauré: Nocturnes & Barcarolles; Suzie LeBlanc, mouvance	**Orchestre classique de Montréal conducted by Jacques Lacombe, Maxime Goulet: Symphonie de la tempête de verglas**; Cryptid Ensemble conducted by Brian Current, Bekah Simms: Bestiaries; Montreal Symphony Orchestra conducted by Rafael Payare, Mahler: Symphony No. 5; Orchestre Métropolitain conducted by Yannick Nézet-Séguin, Sibelius 3 & 4; The Philadelphia Orchestra conducted by Yannick Nézet-Séguin, Rachmaninoff: Symphonies Nos. 2 & 3; Isle of the Dead
Classical Album of the Year – Small Ensemble	Contemporary Christian/Gospel Album of the Year
**Constantinople, Il Ponte di Leonardo**; Andrew Armstrong and James Ehnes, Mythes; Les Barocudas, Basta parlare!; Cheng² Duo, Portrait; Angèle Dubeau and La Pietà Analekta, Portrait: Alex Baranowski	**K-Anthony, Arrow**; Stirling John, Where I'm Meant to Be; Joshua Leventhal, All Ye Lepers; Brooke Nicholls, Glory to God; Tuzee, Alive
Contemporary Indigenous Artist of the Year	Traditional Indigenous Artist of the Year
**Elisapie, Inuktitut**; Aysanabee, Here and Now; Blue Moon Marquee, Scream, Holler & Howl; Shawnee Kish, Revolution; Zoon, Bekka Ma’iingan	**Joel Wood, Sing. Pray. Love.**; The Bearhead Sisters, Mitòòdebi (For My Relatives); Nimkii and the Niniis, LFS5; The Red River Ramblers, Reverie; Young Scouts, Drum Nation
Country Album of the Year	Electronic Album of the Year
**James Barker Band, Ahead of Our Time**; Dean Brody, Right Round Here; Jade Eagleson, Do It Anyway; Brett Kissel, The Compass Project - South Album; Tyler Joe Miller, Spillin' My Truth	**BAMBII, Infinity Club**; Rich Aucoin, Synthetic Season 2; Harrison, Birds, Bees, the Clouds and the Trees; Tim Hecker, No Highs; Kid Koala, Creatures of the Late Afternoon
Francophone Album of the Year	Instrumental Album of the Year
**Les Cowboys Fringants with the Montreal Symphony Orchestra, En concert avec l’Orchestre symphonique de Montréal (sous la direction du chef Simon Leclerc)**; FouKi, Zayon; Karkwa, Dans la seconde; Salebarbes, À boire deboutte; Souldia, Non conventionnel	**Colin Stetson, When we were that what wept for the sea**; Meredith Bates, Tesseract; Markus Floats, Fourth Album; Haralabos [Harry] Stafylakis, Calibrating Friction; Alexandra Stréliski, Néo-Romance
International Album of the Year	Jazz Album of the Year – Solo
**SZA, SOS**; Luke Combs, Gettin' Old; Metro Boomin, Heroes & Villains; Taylor Swift, 1989 (Taylor's Version); Morgan Wallen, One Thing at a Time	**Christine Jensen, Day Moon**; Gentiane MG, Walls Made of Glass; Jocelyn Gould, Sonic Bouquet; Noam Lemish, Twelve; Russ Macklem, The South Detroit Connection
Jazz Album of the Year – Group	Vocal Jazz Album of the Year
**Hilario Duran and His Latin Jazz Big Band, Cry Me a River**; Allison Au with the Migrations Ensemble, Migrations; Canadian Jazz Collective, Septology: The Black Forest Session; Mike Murley and Mark Eisenman Quartet, Recent History; Nick Maclean Quartet feat. Brownman Ali, Convergence	**Dominique Fils-Aimé, Our Roots Run Deep**; Denielle Bassels, Little Bit a' Love; Laila Biali, Your Requests; Alex Bird and Ewen Farncombe, Songwriter; Caity Gyorgy and Mark Limacher, You're Alike, You Two
Metal/Hard Music Album of the Year	Pop Album of the Year
**Cryptopsy, As Gomorrah Burns**; Danko Jones, Electric Sounds; Kataklysm, Goliath; KEN Mode, Void; Voivod, Morgöth Tales	**Charlotte Cardin, 99 Nights**; Rêve, Saturn Return; Lauren Spencer-Smith, Mirror; Shania Twain, Queen of Me; Valley, Lost in Translation
Rap Album/EP of the Year	Rock Album of the Year
**TOBi, Panic**; bbno$, bag or die; Haviah Mighty, Crying Crystals; Kaytraminé, Kaytraminé; Connor Price, Spin the Globe	**The Beaches, Blame My Ex**; The Blue Stones, Pretty Monster; Crown Lands, Fearless; The Glorious Sons, Glory; Metric, Formentera II
Contemporary Roots Album of the Year	Traditional Roots Album of the Year
**William Prince, Stand in the Joy**; The Good Lovelies, We Will Never Be the Same; Allison Russell, The Returner; Logan Staats, A Light in the Attic; Julian Taylor, Beyond the Reservoir	**David Francey, The Breath Between**; Jackson Hollow, Roses; James Keelaghan, Second Hand; Benjamin Dakota Rogers, Paint Horse; Morgan Toney, Resilience
Global Music Album of the Year	Comedy Album of the Year
**Okan, Okantomi**; Bel and Quinn, Donte sann yo; Kizaba, Kizavibe; Moonshine, SMS for Location Vol. 5; Waahli, Soap Box	**Kyle Brownrigg, A Lylebility**; Graham Clark, Never Was; Laurie Elliott, Sexiest Fish in the Lake; Mae Martin, SAP; Derek Seguin, Life of Leisure

=== Songs and recordings ===
Single of the Year	Classical Composition of the Year
**Tate McRae, "Greedy"**; Charlotte Cardin, "Confetti"; Daniel Caesar, "Always"; Lu Kala, "Pretty Girl Era"; Talk, "A Little Bit Happy"	**Nicole Lizée, "Don't Throw Your Head in Your Hands"**; Amy Brandon, "Simulacra"; Iman Habibi, "Shāhīn-nāmeh, for Voice and Orchestra"; Emilie Cecilia LeBel, "…and the Higher Leaves of the Trees Seemed to Shimmer in the Last of the Sunlight’s Lingering Touch of Them…"; Dinuk Wijeratne, "Portrait of an Imaginary Sibling"
Dance Recording of the Year	Rap Single of the Year
**Felix Cartal and Karen Harding, "Need Your Love"**; Dom Dolla and Nelly Furtado, "Eat Your Man"; DVBBS, Jeremih and Sk8, "Crew Thang"; Loud Luxury and DVBBS feat. Kane Brown, "Next to You"; Frank Walker feat. Ella Henderson, "I Go Dancing"	**TOBi, "Someone I Knew"**; Belly, "American Nightmare"; Haviah Mighty, "Honey Bun"; Pressa, "Minimum Wage"; Connor Price feat. Bens, "Spinnin'"
Contemporary R&B/Soul Recording of the Year	Traditional R&B/Soul Recording of the Year
**Daniel Caesar, Never Enough**; Nonso Amadi, When It Blooms; Aqyila, For the Better; Shay Lia, Facets; Jon Vinyl, Heartbreak Hill	**Aqyila, "Hello"**; Jhyve, "Unbreakable"; Luna Elle, "9 to 5"; Katie Tupper, Where to Find Me; RealestK, Real World
Reggae Recording of the Year	Underground Dance Single of the Year
**Kirk Diamond feat. Finn, Dread**; Ammoye, "Stir This Thing"; Jah'Mila, Roots Girl; Exco Levi, "Feel Like Home"; Omega Mighty feat. 4Korners and Haviah Mighty, "Rush Dem"	**Blond:ish, "Call My Name"**; DJ Karaba, "Mad Mess"; LostBoyJay, "Could Be Wrong"; Peach, "Eclipse"; Smalltown DJs, "Concorde Groove"

=== Other ===
Album Artwork of the Year	Video of the Year
**Nicolas Lemieux, Mykaël Nelson, Albert Zablit — Montreal Symphony Orchestra, Riopelle symphonique**; Carolyne De Bellefeuille, Jessica Ledoux, Mali Savaria-Ille, Veronique Lafortune, Leeor Wild — Elisapie, Inuktitut; Heather Goodchild, Colby Richardson, Colin Fletcher, Sara Melvin — Feist, Multitudes; Kit King, Vanessa Heins — City and Colour, The Love Still Held Me Near; Quinton Nyce, Brodie Metcalfe, Davis Graham, Kaylee Smoke — Snotty Nose Rez Kids, I’M GOOD, HBU?	**Ethan Tobman — Allison Russell, "Demons"**; Andrew De Zen — Alaskan Tapes, "Of Woods and Seas"; Jordan Clarke — des hume feat. juicelover, "onetwostep"; Sterling Larose — Snotty Nose Rez Kids, "DAMN RIGHT"; Sterling Larose and Zachary Vague — young friend, "feral canadian scaredy cat"
MusiCounts Teacher of the Year
**Stephen Richardson - École St. Joseph, Yellowknife, NT**; Zeda Ali - Sunnyview Middle School, Brampton, ON; Robert Bailey - École Charlie Killam School, Camrose, AB; Élisabeth Bouchard-Bernier - École Des Explorateurs, Malartic, QC; Sarah Comerford - Macdonald Drive Junior High, St. John's, NL

== Special awards ==
Maestro Fresh Wes was this year's Canadian Music Hall of Fame inductee, the first rapper to receive the honour. It was presented by Kardinal Offishall. Tegan and Sara were given the Juno Humanitarian Award from actor Elliot Page for their work as advocates for the 2SLGBTQ+ community.
