= Sugluk =

Sugluk is an Inuktitut term that translates to "skinny people". It may refer to:

- Salluit, an Inuit community in northern Quebec formerly named Sugluk
- Sugluk Inlet, a body of water in northern Quebec
- Sugluk (band), an all-Inuit rock band from Salluit
