= Skiifall =

Canadian rapper

Skiifall is the stage name of Shemar McKie, a Canadian rapper from Montreal, Quebec.

Originally from Saint Vincent and the Grenadines, he moved to Montreal in childhood.

He released his debut single "Ting Tun Up" in 2020. After the song quickly became a breakout hit in the United Kingdom, he collaborated with British rapper Knucks on the remix "Ting Tun Up, Part II". He then followed up with the single "Bentayga Dust", before releasing the three-song EP Woiiyoie Tapes Vol. 1 in fall 2021. The EP's track "Lost Angeles" was selected by designer Virgil Abloh to soundtrack a commercial for Louis Vuitton's special collaborative National Basketball Association fashion line.

In December 2021, he signed with XL Recordings, and released the single "Break of Dawn" in collaboration with BadBadNotGood, with whom he toured extensively in 2022.

In April 2023, he released the seven-song EP Woiiyoie Vol. 2 – Intense City, following up in November with the non-EP single "Left the Trenches".

He has also collaborated with Charlotte Cardin on the songs "Yuteman Denis" from the Intense City EP, "Enfer" from Cardin's album 99 Nights, and "TTYGF" from the album Ö by Fcukers.
