= Tant pis pour elle =

Single by Charlotte Cardin

from the album Midnight, mon amour
- Released: September 5, 2025
- Genre: Pop, French pop
- Label: Cult Nation
- Producer: Jason Brando

Charlotte Cardin singles chronology
"Feel Good (Version Acoustique)" (2025)	"Tant pis pour elle" (2025)	"The Way We Touch" (2026)

"Tant pis pour elle" (/tɑːn pi pʊr ɛl/; lit. 'Too bad for her') is a French-language song by Canadian singer-songwriter Charlotte Cardin. Released on September 5, 2025, as the lead single from her upcoming third studio album Midnight, mon amour, the song marks Cardin's return to French-language music and the beginning of a new artistic era following her 2023 album 99 Nights.

== Background and composition ==
Following the commercial and critical success of her second studio album 99 Nights (2023), which peaked at number three on the Billboard Canadian Albums Chart, Cardin felt inspired to return to writing in French. The Montreal-born, Paris-based artist co-wrote "Tant pis pour elle" with long-time collaborators Jason Brando and Ellie Blondeau. Regarding the shift in language, Cardin stated, "I just felt the need to write music in French because after '99 Nights,' we still felt creative and inspired."

Lyrically, the song narrates a story of romantic obsession and jealousy, depicted through a woman who takes delight in the return of her lover. The composition features an obsessive repetition of the sound "elle" throughout the track. Musically, it begins with a subdued tone before building into a display of Cardin's powerful vocal range.

== Production ==
"Tant pis pour elle" was produced by Jason Brando, who also provided vocal production alongside Sam Avant. Brando and Avant were responsible for the track's instrumentation, handling guitars, synthesizers, and percussion, as well as the recording engineering. The song was mixed by Rob Kinelski at The Fortress of Amplitude, with assistance from Eli Heisler, and mastered by Dave Kutch at The Mastering Palace. The track is a denim production released in association with Cult Nation.

Critics have described the production as "razor-sharp," noting the use of resonant elements that amplify the raw emotion of the lyrics. It has been characterized as an anthem of "visceral freedom."

== Music video ==
The official music video for "Tant pis pour elle" premiered on October 28, 2025. Directed by Jason Brando, the visual piece portrays a complex love triangle, exploring themes of power dynamics and "controlled revenge."

=== Synopsis and reception ===
Director Jason Brando described the concept as an exploration of "measured revenge," stating: "We wanted to explore... not an explosion, but inner control. Taking something raw—the hurt, the jealousy, the loss—and making it beautiful, precise, almost choreographed." The video uses a dark, elegant aesthetic to transform themes of pain and jealousy into a visual staging of Cardin reclaiming her power.

=== Cast and crew ===
The video stars French actor Jérémie Laheurte as "Vincent" and British actress Sophie Robertson as "Nathalie".

The video was produced by Zion Lipstein-Saffer and Joshua Rosenbaum, with Christian Tyler and Alexandre Auray serving as executive producers. The cinematography was handled by Alexandre Nour Desjardins, while the visual effects (VFX) and animation were created by artist Jordan Lavery.

The production also featured choreography by Amy Gardner, who worked with the cast to establish the video's "almost choreographed" precision. The styling and aesthetic were further supported by hair stylist David D'Amours.

== Critical reception ==
The song received positive reviews upon release. Critics described it as "bold" and "irresistibly addictive," praising Cardin's audacity and authenticity. It has been compared favorably to her previous French-language single "Feel Good" (2023), while being noted as a distinct evolution in her artistry that "carves out a new era."

== Credits and personnel ==
Song credits

- Charlotte Cardin – vocals, songwriting
- Jason Brando – production, songwriting, vocal production, guitar, synthesizer, percussion, recording
- Ellie Blondeau – songwriting
- Sam Avant – vocal production, guitar, synthesizer, percussion, recording
- Rob Kinelski – mixing
- Eli Heisler – mixing assistance
- Dave Kutch – mastering

Video credits

- Director – Jason Brando
- Producers – Zion Lipstein-Saffer, Joshua Rosenbaum
- Executive Producers – Christian Tyler, Alexandre Auray
- Production Company – denim
- Director of Photography – Alexandre Nour Desjardins
- VFX & Animation – Jordan Lavery
- Choreography – Amy Gardner
- Hair Stylist – David D'Amours
- Cast – Jérémie Laheurte, Sophie Robertson

== Charts ==
Chart performance for "Tant pis pour elle"
Chart (2025–2026)	Peak position
Canada Hot 100 (Billboard)	89
Canada AC (Billboard)	24
Belgium (Ultratop 50 Wallonia)	4
France (SNEP)	30
France Airplay (SNEP)	6
US Adult Pop Airplay (Billboard)	24

== Certifications ==
Region	Certification	Certified units/sales
France (SNEP)	Platinum	200,000^{‡}
^{‡} Sales+streaming figures based on certification alone.
