= Tomb Mold =

Canadian metal band

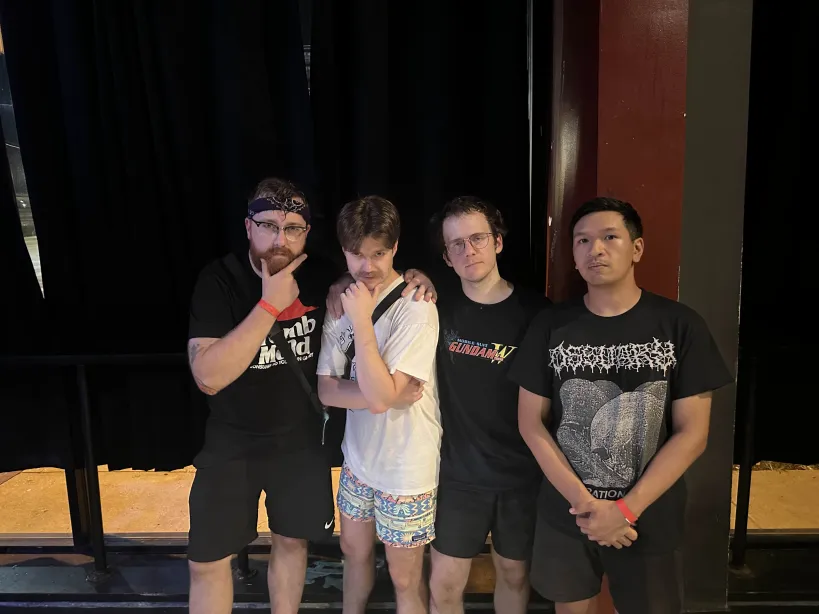

Background information
- Origin: Toronto
- Genres: Death metal, progressive death metal
- Years active: 2015–present
- Label: 20 Buck Spin
- Members: Derrick Vella; Max Klebanoff; Payson Power; Kevin Sia
- Past members: Steve Musgrave

Tomb Mold is a Canadian death metal band from Toronto.

Formed in 2016, the band released their debut studio album Primordial Malignity, the following year. In 2018 they released their second album Manor of Infinite Forms, followed by their Planetary Clairvoyance a year later. The band was relatively inactive for the next few years, releasing no new material until an EP titled Aperture of Body in 2022.

On 11 September 2023, they announced their fourth album The Enduring Spirit, which was released only four days later. The album was met with positive reception upon its release. The album was a longlisted nominee for the 2024 Polaris Music Prize.

== Discography ==
=== Albums ===
- Primordial Malignity (2017)
- Manor of Infinite Forms (2018)
- Planetary Clairvoyance (2019)
- The Enduring Spirit (2023)

=== Compilations ===
- The Bottomless Perdition / The Moulting (2017)
- Cyberpunk 2077 (2020)

=== EPs ===
- Cerulean Salvation (2018)
- Aperture of Body (2022)

=== Demos ===
- The Bottomless Perdition (2016)
- The Moulting (2016)
- Cryptic Transmissions (2017)

== Members ==
=== Current members ===
- Derrick Vella – bass (2015-2016, 2022–2023), guitars (2015–present)
- Max Klebanoff – drums, vocals (2015–present)
- Payson Power – guitars (2016–present)
- Kevin Sia – bass (2023–present)

=== Former members ===
- Steve Musgrave – bass (2016–2020)
