= Nate Husser =

Canadian rapper

Nate Husser is the stage name of Nathaniel Huskinson, a Canadian rapper from Montreal, Quebec.

Husser began his musical career in the mid-2010s as a member of the duo The Posterz with Kris the $pirit. The duo released the album Junga in 2015. After the duo broke up, he released a number of solo singles, including "Can't Blame 'Em" and "Catherine", on Montreal record label Cult Nation, and was a featured artist on Charlotte Cardin's 2016 single "Like It Doesn't Hurt" from her EP Big Boy. He released his debut solo album Geto Rock for the Youth in 2017. He followed up with the EPs minus 23 in July 2018, 6° in October 2018, and 23+ in February 2019.

In 2020 and 2021 he released a slew of singles, including "Foot on They Neck", "On Lock", "I Been Doing Great (You Can Stop MFing Asking)", "Knocked Off", "I Just Bought Another Neck", "Punk Me", "Jelly", "Iced Out Baby-G", "Clap" and "Gang Signs". In 2021 he released the EP Adult Supervision, and collaborated with FouKi on the bilingual non-album single "Poutine Sauce".

In addition to his musical career, Husser also organizes an annual charity basketball tournament as a fundraiser for youth programs in Montreal's Little Burgundy neighbourhood.
