= 99 Nights (album) =

Studio album by Charlotte Cardin
- Released: 25 August 2023
- Genre: Pop
- Length: 38:50
- Label: Cult Nation
- Producers: Jason Brando; Jorgen Odegard; Jennifer Decilveo; Lubalin; Rob Grimaldi; Sam Avant; Ryan Linvill; Vince Carter; Mathieu Sénéchal; Digital Farm Animals; Harper Gordon; MAG; Felix Joseph; Mr. Hudson; Patrick Watson

Charlotte Cardin chronology
Phoenix (2021)	99 Nights (2023)	Midnight, mon amour (2027)

Singles from 99 Nights
- 1. "Confetti" Released: 11 April 2023; 2. "Looping" Released: 12 May 2023; 3. "99 Nights" Released: 9 June 2023; 4. "Jim Carrey" Released: 14 July 2023

99 Nights is the second studio album by Canadian pop singer Charlotte Cardin, released on August 25, 2023, through Cult Nation. Cardin described the album as "a musical diary" and her "soundtrack of [2021] summer".

The album won the Juno Awards for Album of the Year and Pop Album of the Year at the Juno Awards of 2024, and was shortlisted for the 2024 Polaris Music Prize.

== Critical reception ==
Professional ratings
Review scores
Source	Rating
The Telegraph	4/5 stars

LA Robinson of The Telegraph awarded the album 4 out of 5 stars and complimented Cardin's "vixenly voice" that is "able to carry most any tune". He described the album as "a catchy introduction to a quality artist" with "sexy-trappy syncopations" and "reverbing surf rock guitars".

The album received two Juno Award nominations at the Juno Awards of 2024, for Album of the Year and Pop Album of the Year. "Confetti" was a nominee for Single of the Year, Cardin and her songwriting collaborators Jason Brando and Lubalin were nominated for Songwriter of the Year for "Confetti", "Daddy's a Psycho" and "Jim Carrey", and Brando, Lubalin, Mathieu Sénéchal and Sam Avant were nominated for Producer of the Year for "Confetti" and "Jim Carrey".

The album won the Félix Award for Anglophone Album of the Year at the 46th Félix Awards.

== Track listing ==
99 Nights track listing
No.	Title	Writer(s)	Producer(s)	Length
1.	"Puppy"	Charlotte Cardin; Jason Brando; Jorgen Odegard; UPSAHL; Mathieu Sénéchal	Jason Brando; Jorgen Odegard	3:55
2.	"Enfer" (with Skiifall)	Cardin; Jennifer Decilveo; Brando; Skiifall	Jennifer Decilveo	2:58
3.	"Confetti"	Cardin; Brando; Lubalin	Brando; Lubalin; Rob Grimaldi; Sam Avant	3:03
4.	"Way Back"	Cardin; Brando; Ryan Linvill; Mathieu Sénéchal; Lubalin	Brando; Lubalin; Avant; Ryan Linvill; Vince Carter	2:57
5.	"Jim Carrey"	Cardin; Brando; Lubalin; Sénéchal	Cardin; Brando; Lubalin; Sénéchal	3:03
6.	"How High"	Cardin; Brando; Lubalin; Sénéchal	Cardin; Avant; Lubalin; Sénéchal	3:12
7.	"Somebody First"	Cardin; Aliocha Schneider; Brando; Lubalin; Sénéchal	Harper Gordon; Brando; Lubalin; Sénéchal	2:44
8.	"99 Nights"	Cardin; Brando; Digital Farm Animals	Brando; Digital Farm Animals	2:56
9.	"Someone I Could Love"	Cardin; Brando; Lubalin; Sénéchal	Brando; Lubalin; Sénéchal; MAG	3:05
10.	"Looping"	Cardin; Alan Bergman; Felix Joseph; Brando; Marvin Hamlisch; Marilyn Bergman; Mr. Hudson	Felix Joseph; Brando; Benjamin Hudson McIldowie (Mr. Hudson)	3:13
11.	"Daddy's a Psycho"	Cardin; Brando; Lubalin	Brando; Lubalin; Gordon; Avant	4:19
12.	"Next to You"	Cardin; Patrick Watson	Patrick Watson	3:25
Total length:				38:50

== Charts ==
Chart performance for 99 Nights
Chart (2023–2025)	Peak position
Belgian Albums (Ultratop Wallonia)	59
Canadian Albums (Billboard)	3
French Albums (SNEP)	33

== Certifications ==
Certifications for 99 Nights
Region	Certification	Certified units/sales
Canada (Music Canada)	Platinum	80,000^{‡}
France (SNEP)	Platinum	100,000^{‡}
^{‡} Sales+streaming figures based on certification alone.

== Release history ==
Release dates and formats for 99 Nights
Region	Date	Format(s)	Label	Ref.
Various	25 August 2023	CD; digital download; LP; streaming	Cult Nation	
