= The Enduring Spirit =

Studio album by Tomb Mold
- Released: September 15, 2023
- Recorded: 2020–2023
- Studio: Boxcar Sound Recording, Hamilton, Ontario
- Genre: Progressive death metal
- Length: 42:52
- Label: 20 Buck Spin

Tomb Mold chronology
Planetary Clairvoyance (2019)	The Enduring Spirit (2023)

The Enduring Spirit is the fourth studio album by Canadian death metal band Tomb Mold. It was released on September 15, 2023, through 20 Buck Spin. Physical copies were released on October 13. It marks their first studio release in four years, following Planetary Clairvoyance (2019).

== Background ==
Tomb Mold announced the album on September 11, 2023, only four days before its release. It was recorded at Boxcar Sound Recording with assistance by long-time collaborator Sean Pearson. Mixing and mastering was handled by Arthur Rizk. In a statement, the band shared that they spent the previous three years "spiraling in the cycle reincarnate necessity" and announced that the "myriad of consciousness" have now aggregate in one. The trio invited listeners to "dive into the gnashing current" of their new record. The album was described as an "expansion on their sound" displayed on the EP Aperture of Body, released in June 2022. In promotion of the album, Tomb Mold hosted two listening parties in Toronto and Montreal. The cover artwork depicts a painting by Jesse Jacobi.

== Critical reception ==
Professional ratings
Aggregate scores
Source	Rating
Metacritic	85/100
Review scores
Source	Rating
Distorted Sound	8/10
Pitchfork	8.6/10

The Enduring Spirit received a score of 85 out of 100 on review aggregator Metacritic based on four critics' reviews, indicating "universal acclaim". Brad Sanders at Pitchfork called it their best album yet and awarded the record the accolade "Best New Music". Through a "fast and loose" play "with the boundaries between death metal and their myriad other interests—jazz fusion, '70s prog, 4AD-style dream-pop", the album finds the band "roaring back to life" and unfolding "tangled riffs, nimble drums, and inhuman growls they perfected across their first three records". Sanders listed Klebanoff's lyrics and Vella and Power's guitar play as the key points to their evolution, the latter being referred to as being the "hooks" of the album. Corinne Westbrook of Knotfest praised the "endless fantastic riffing, complex and adventuring songwriting and groovy brutality", calling it a nice opportunity to "bludgeon your senses".

The album was a longlisted nominee for the 2024 Polaris Music Prize.

== Track listing ==
All tracks are written by Tomb Mold.

The Enduring Spirit track listing
No.	Title	Length
1.	"The Perfect Memory (Phantasm of Aura)"	4:14
2.	"Angelic Fabrications"	3:30
3.	"Will of Whispers"	6:50
4.	"Fate's Tangled Thread"	6:46
5.	"Flesh as Armour"	4:13
6.	"Servants of Possibility"	5:44
7.	"The Enduring Spirit of Calamity"	11:35
Total length:		42:52

== Personnel ==
Tomb Mold

- Derrick Vella – guitars, bass
- Payson Power – guitars
- Max Klebanoff – drums, vocals

Additional personnel

- Sean Pearson – recording
- Arthur Rizk – mixing, mastering

== Charts ==
Chart performance for The Enduring Spirit
Chart (2023)	Peak position
UK Album Downloads (OCC)	47
