= New West (band) =

Canadian musical group

- Origin: Toronto, Ontario, Canada
- Genres: Indie rock, pop rock, rhythm and blues
- Labels: Republic Records
- Members: Kala Wita; Vella; Ben Key; Noel West
- Website: newwest199x.com

New West is a Canadian musical group from Toronto, Ontario. They are most noted as the winners of the Juno Award for Breakthrough Group of the Year at the Juno Awards of 2024.

The group, who consider themselves a musical collective rather than a band in the traditional sense, consists of multi-instrumentalists Kala Wita, Vella, Ben Key and Noel West. Their music blends rhythm and blues and indie rock influences. They released a number of singles, including "Cold Tea" and "Those Eyes", before releasing their full-length debut album Based on a True Story in fall 2023.

== Discography ==
=== Studio albums ===
- Singles 2020 - 2021 (January 14, 2022)
- Based On A True Story... (October 20, 2023)

=== EPs ===
- Call Me When You Hear This Song (June 7, 2019)
- In Good Time (April 8, 2022)
- Cotswold (May 3, 2024)
- Stevie Nicks (June 21, 2024)
- New West (EP) (November 15, 2024)

=== Singles ===
- "Those Eyes" (May 10, 2019)
- "Call Me When You Hear This Song" (May 24, 2019)
- "Hate That I Love You" (November 15, 2019)
- "Next To You" (January 10, 2020)
- "This Little Story" (February 7, 2020)
- "This Little Story" (Acoustic) (2020)
- "Years Ago" (March 13, 2020)
- "Wrote This For You" (April 10, 2020)
- "Paris" (May 15, 2020)
- "Balenciaga" (June 26, 2020)
- "Five Miles High" (August 21, 2020)
- "Lovely" (October 23, 2020)
- "Some Might Say" (2020/2021)
- "God Only Knows" (January 15, 2021)
- "The Wait" (February 19, 2021)
- "We've Been Fighting For Miles" (April 9, 2021)
- "Summer B-Sides" (June 25, 2021)
- "27" (August 13, 2021)
- "You Got The Part" (September 24, 2021)
- "Kids Who Stole The World" (October 29, 2021)
- "Year In Review" (December 10, 2021)
- "Panick Attack" (February 4, 2022)
- "Those Eyes" (Alternate Versions) (July 20, 2022)
- "Apple Music Home Sessions: New West - Single" (March 24, 2023)
- "homecoming / in my city" (April 21, 2023)
- "IYKYK" (August 18, 2023)
- "Cold Tea" (September 22, 2023)
- "Spotify Singles" (October 4, 2023)
- "Those Eyes" (January 5, 2024)
- "Credits" (March 29, 2024)
- "HAPPIER!" (September 6, 2024)
