= Juno Award for Pop Album of the Year =

Canadian music award

- Description: Recognition for the best pop album by a Canadian artist
- Country: Canada
- Presented by: CARAS (Canadian Academy of Recording Arts and Sciences)
- Website: junoawards.ca

The Juno Award for "Pop Album of the Year" has been awarded since 1999, as recognition each year for the best pop album in Canada. The category was first named as Best Pop Album but it changed to Best Pop/Adult Album in 2000, the following year it returned to be Best Pop Album from 2001 to 2002, finally in 2003 was changed to Pop Album of the Year and has remained that way since then. Justin Bieber has won the most awards in this category, with 3 wins.

== Recipients ==
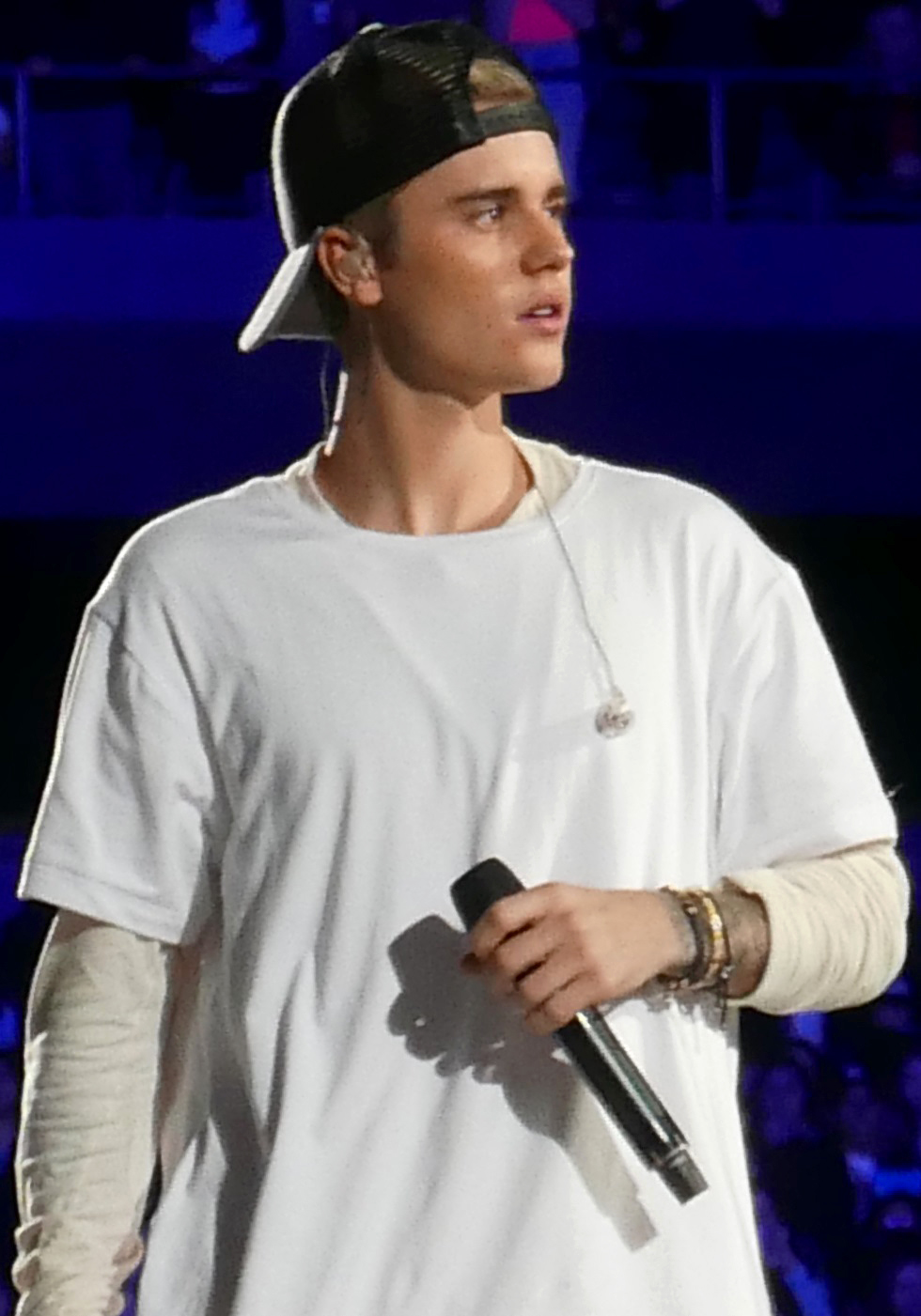
Three-time recipient Justin Bieber has the most wins in this category, winning in 2011, 2016, and 2021.

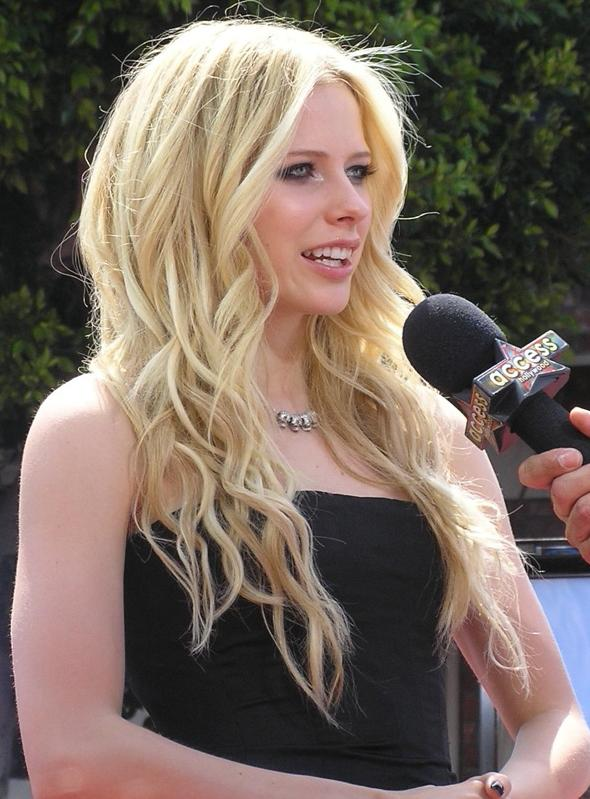
Two-time winner Avril Lavigne won in 2003 and 2005.

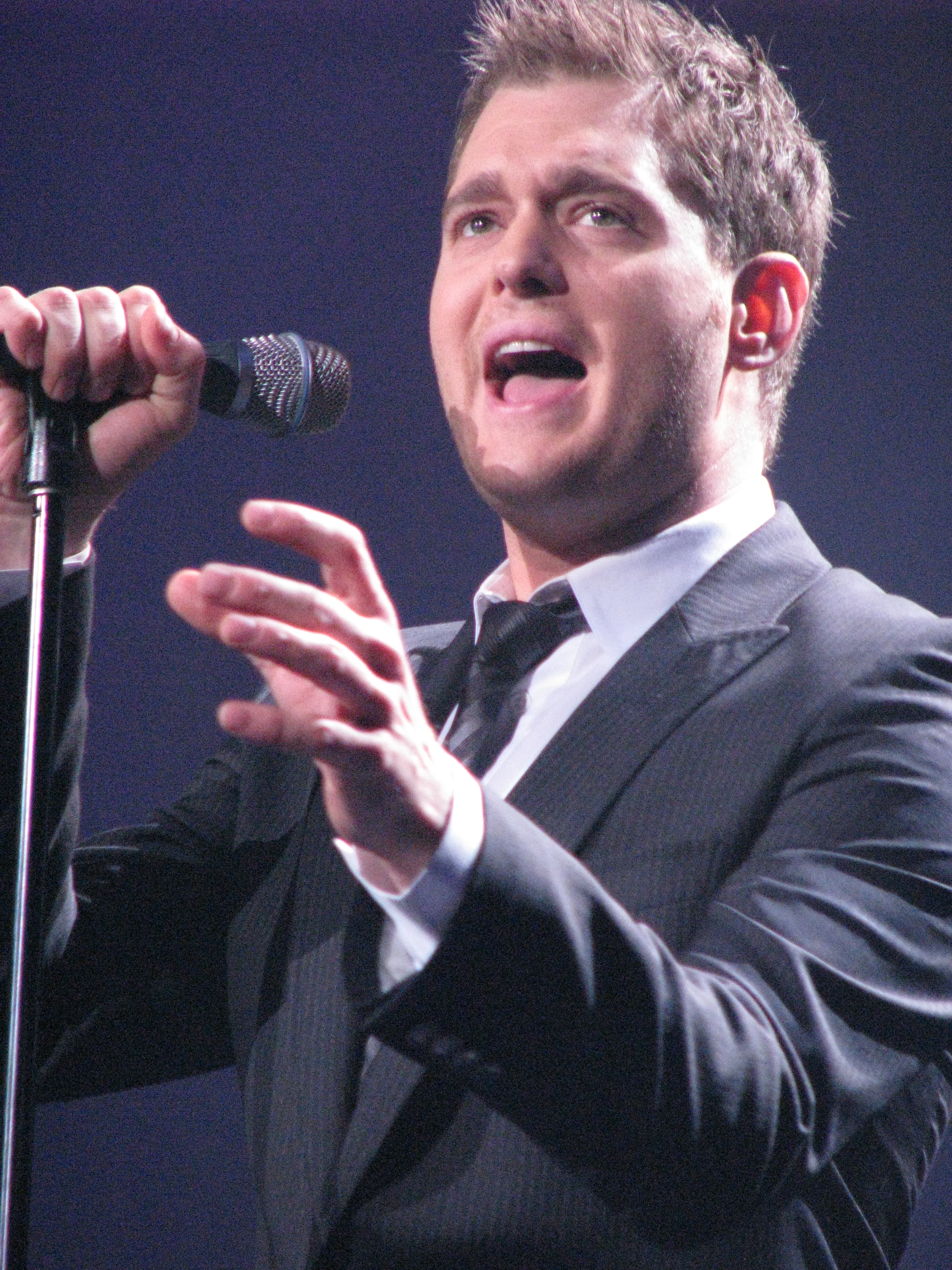
Two-time winner Michael Bublé won in 2006 and 2010.

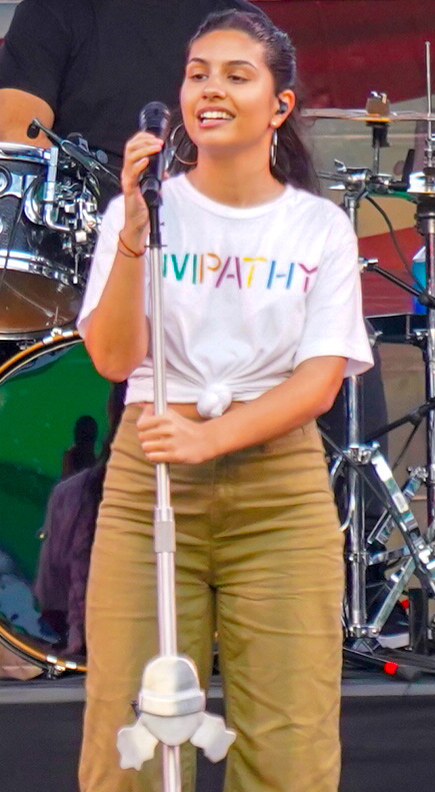
Two-time winner Alessia Cara won in 2017 and 2020.

| Year^{[I]} | Performing artist(s) | Work | Nominees^{[II]} | Ref. |
|---|---|---|---|---|
| 1999 | Barenaked Ladies | Stunt | The Moffatts, Chapter I: A New Beginning; Philosopher Kings, Famous, Rich and Beautiful; Kevin Parent, Grand parleur petit faiseur; Jann Arden, Happy?; Celine Dion, Let's Talk About Love | |
| 2000 | Chantal Kreviazuk | Colour Moving and Still | Bryan Adams, On a Day Like Today; Alanis Morissette, Supposed Former Infatuation Junkie; Tal Bachman, Tal Bachman; Joni Mitchell, Taming the Tiger | |
| 2001 | Barenaked Ladies | Maroon | Snow, Mind on the Moon; The Moffatts, Submodalities; Nelly Furtado, Whoa, Nelly!; Sarah Harmer, You Were Here | |
| 2002 | David Usher | Morning Orbit | Emm Gryner, Girl Versions; Cowboy Junkies, Open; Prozzäk, Saturday People; Leonard Cohen, Ten New Songs | |
| 2003 | Avril Lavigne | Let Go | Jarvis Church, Shake It Off; Emm Gryner, Asianblue; Amanda Marshall, Everybody's Got a Story; Alanis Morissette, Under Rug Swept | |
| 2004 | Sarah McLachlan | Afterglow | Barenaked Ladies, Everything to Everyone; Barlow, Barlow; Nelly Furtado, Folklore; Lillix, Falling Uphill | |
| 2005 | Avril Lavigne | Under My Skin | Fefe Dobson, Fefe Dobson; Ryan Malcolm, Home; Celine Dion, Miracle; Simple Plan, Still Not Getting Any... | |
| 2006 | Michael Bublé | It's Time | Boom Desjardins, Boom Desjardins; Jann Arden, Jann Arden; Theresa Sokyrka, These Old Charms; Kalan Porter, 219 Days | |
| 2007 | Nelly Furtado | Loose | k-os, Atlantis: Hymns for Disco; Chantal Kreviazuk, Ghost Stories; Tomi Swick, Stalled Out in the Doorway; Sarah McLachlan, Wintersong | |
| 2008 | Feist | The Reminder | Michael Bublé, Call Me Irresponsible; Anne Murray, Anne Murray Duets: Friends & Legends; Bedouin Soundclash, Street Gospels; Celine Dion, Taking Chances | |
| 2009 | Alanis Morissette | Flavors of Entanglement | The Midway State, Holes; Creature, No Sleep At All; Kreesha Turner, Passion; David Usher, Wake Up and Say Goodbye | |
| 2010 | Michael Bublé | Crazy Love | Lights, The Listening; Justin Bieber, My World; Hedley, The Show Must Go; Stereos, Stereos | |
| 2011 | Justin Bieber | My World 2.0 | Bobby Bazini, Better In Time; Faber Drive, Can't Keep a Secret; Sarah McLachlan, Laws of Illusion; Down with Webster, Time to Win, Vol. 1 | |
| 2012 | Hedley | Storms | Down with Webster, Time to Win, Vol. 2; Avril Lavigne, Goodbye Lullaby; Lights, Siberia; Marianas Trench, Ever After | |
| 2013 | Carly Rae Jepsen | Kiss | Justin Bieber, Believe; Victoria Duffield, Shut Up and Dance; Nelly Furtado, The Spirit Indestructible; Kristina Maria, Tell the World | |
| 2014 | Tegan and Sara | Heartthrob | Hedley, Wild Life; Michael Bublé, To Be Loved; Robin Thicke, Blurred Lines; Walk Off the Earth, R.E.V.O. | |
| 2015 | Lights | Little Machines | Avril Lavigne, Avril Lavigne; Down with Webster, Party for Your Life; Magic!, Don't Kill the Magic; Nikki Yanofsky, Little Secret | |
| 2016 | Justin Bieber | Purpose | Hedley, Hello; Scott Helman, Augusta; Shawn Mendes, Handwritten; Walk Off the Earth, Sing It All Away | |
| 2017 | Alessia Cara | Know-It-All | Coleman Hell, Summerland; Marianas Trench, Astoria; Shawn Mendes, Illuminate; Tegan and Sara, Love You to Death | |
| 2018 | Lights | Skin & Earth | Ria Mae, My Love; Ruth B, Save Haven; Scott Helman, Hôtel de Ville; ~~Hedley, Cageless~~ - nomination withdrawn | |
| 2019 | Shawn Mendes | Shawn Mendes | bülow, Damaged; Chromeo, Head Over Heels; Hubert Lenoir, Darlène; Tyler Shaw, Intuition | |
| 2020 | Alessia Cara | The Pains of Growing | Bülow, Crystalline; Elijah Woods x Jamie Fine, 8:47; Avril Lavigne, Head Above Water; Walk Off the Earth, Here We Go! | |
| 2021 | Justin Bieber | Changes | Ryland James, Ryland James; Johnny Orlando, It's Never Really Over; JP Saxe, Hold It Together; Lennon Stella, Three. Two. One. | |
| 2022 | Charlotte Cardin | Phoenix | Justin Bieber, Justice; Jessia, How Are You?; Tate McRae, Too Young to Be Sad; Shawn Mendes, Wonder | |
| 2023 | The Weeknd | Dawn FM | Alessia Cara, In the Meantime; Carly Rae Jepsen, The Loneliest Time; Avril Lavigne, Love Sux; Tate McRae, I Used to Think I Could Fly | |
| 2024 | Charlotte Cardin | 99 Nights | Rêve, Saturn Return; Lauren Spencer-Smith, Mirror; Shania Twain, Queen of Me; Valley, Lost in Translation | |
| 2025 | Tate McRae | Think Later | Jamie Fine, If this is it…; Shawn Mendes, Shawn; Preston Pablo, Anywhere But Here; Alexander Stewart, Bleeding Heart | |
| 2026 | Tate McRae | So Close to What | bbno$, bbno$; Justin Bieber, Swag II; Nelly Furtado, 7; The Weeknd, Hurry Up Tomorrow | |
