= Talk (musician) =

Canadian musician

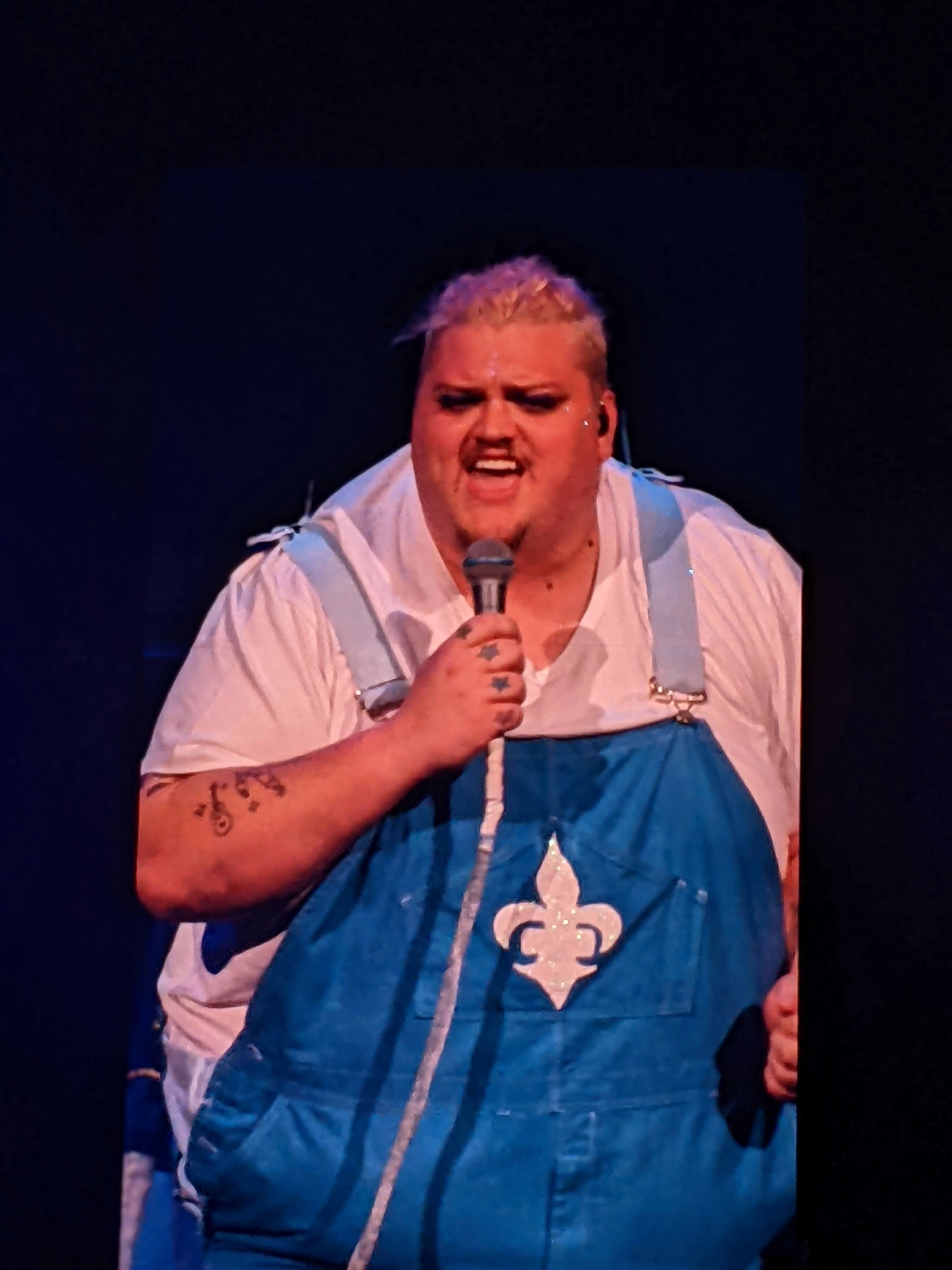
- Talk performing in 2023

Background information
- Born: Nicholas Durocher; Ottawa, Ontario, Canada
- Genre: Indie rock
- Occupations: Singer-songwriter; musician
- Instruments: Vocals; guitar; bass guitar
- Years active: 2010s–present
- Labels: Capitol; Big Loud

Nicholas Durocher, known professionally as Talk (stylized in all caps), is a Canadian singer-songwriter and musician from Ottawa, Ontario. He is best known for his 2021 hit single "Run Away to Mars".

== Career ==
A native of Ottawa, Durocher began his musical career in the 2010s as a bassist in a country band. During the COVID-19 pandemic, he became unemployed and had to move into his parents' basement in the suburban neighbourhood of Stittsville. This is where he wrote the song "Run Away to Mars", which he released in June 2021 as his debut single. He followed it up in November with the EP Talk to Me. "Run Away to Mars" received a boost in 2022, when it went viral on TikTok, hitting the streaming charts in several countries. By January 2023, the song had reached number one on Billboard's Adult Alternative charts. It also reached a peak of 22 on the Canadian Hot 100 chart.

In 2023, Durocher participated in an all-star recording of Serena Ryder's song "What I Wouldn't Do", which was released as a charity single to benefit Kids Help Phone's Feel Out Loud campaign for youth mental health. In October, he issued his debut studio album, Lord of the Flies & Birds & Bees.

Talk received several Juno Award nominations at the 2024 ceremony, including Breakthrough Artist of the Year (which he won) and Songwriter of the Year, for the songs "Afraid of the Dark", "A Little Bit Happy", and "Wasteland"; Album of the Year and Alternative Album of the Year for Lord of the Flies & Birds & Bees; and Single of the Year for "A Little Bit Happy". Lord of the Flies & Birds & Bees was also a longlisted nominee for the 2024 Polaris Music Prize.

In October 2026, he was announced among the participants of Canada's Choice, the Canadian national final for the 2027 Eurovision Song Contest.

== Discography ==
=== Studio albums ===
| Title | Details | Peak chart positions | Certifications |
| Title | Details | CAN | Certifications |
|---|---|---|---|
| Lord of the Flies & Birds & Bees | Released: October 20, 2023; Format: Digital download, CD, LP; Label: Capitol Records | 33 | MC: Gold |
| The Ballad of Ozzy Moon | Releasing: January 22, 2027; Format: Digital download, CD, LP; Label: Big Loud | — | — |

=== EPs ===
| Title | Details |
|---|---|
| Talk to Me | Released: November 19, 2021; Format: Digital download; Label: DooGood |

=== Singles ===
| Title | Year | Peak chart positions | | | | | | | Certifications | Album |
| Title | Year | CAN | CAN Rock | NOR | SWE | US AAA | US Alt | US Rock | Certifications | Album |
|---|---|---|---|---|---|---|---|---|---|---|
| "Run Away to Mars" | 2021 | 22 | 1 | 4 | 29 | 1 | 6 | 22 | MC: 4× Platinum; GLF: Gold; RIAA: Gold | Lord of the Flies & Birds & Bees |
| "How to Save a Life" | 2022 | — | — | — | — | — | — | — | | Non-album single |
| "Afraid of the Dark" | 2023 | — | 47 | — | — | — | — | — | | Lord of the Flies & Birds & Bees |
| "A Little Bit Happy" | 2023 | — | — | — | — | — | — | — | MC: Gold | Lord of the Flies & Birds & Bees |
| "Wasteland" | 2023 | — | 3 | — | — | — | — | — | | Lord of the Flies & Birds & Bees |
| "Time Machine" | 2026 | 52 | 25 | — | — | — | — | — | | The Ballad of Ozzy Moon |
| "GTFU" | 2026 | — | — | — | — | — | — | — | | The Ballad of Ozzy Moon |
| "Up & Away" | 2026 | — | — | — | — | — | — | — | | The Ballad of Ozzy Moon |
| "Boomerang" | 2026 | — | — | — | — | — | — | — | | The Ballad of Ozzy Moon |
| "Ordinary" | 2026 | — | — | — | — | — | — | — | — | The Ballad of Ozzy Moon |
"—" denotes a recording that did not chart or was not released in that territory.
