= 2024 Polaris Music Prize =

Canadian music award

- Date: September 17, 2024
- Location: Massey Hall
- Country: Canada
- Winner(s): Jeremy Dutcher, Motewolonuwok
- Website: polarismusicprize.ca

The 2024 edition of the Canadian Polaris Music Prize was presented on September 17, 2024 at Massey Hall.

The longlist was announced on June 11, and the shortlist was released July 12.

The award was won by Jeremy Dutcher for his album Motewolonuwok, making him the first repeat winner of the award in its history.

== Shortlist ==
- Jeremy Dutcher, Motewolonuwok
- BAMBII, Infinity Club
- The Beaches, Blame My Ex
- Charlotte Cardin, 99 Nights
- Cindy Lee, Diamond Jubilee
- DijahSB, The Flower That Knew
- Elisapie, Inuktitut
- NOBRO, Set Your Pussy Free
- Allison Russell, The Returner
- Tobi, Panic

== Longlist ==
- Allie X, Girl with No Face
- BAMBII, Infinity Club
- The Beaches, Blame My Ex
- Big Brave, A Chaos of Flowers
- Haley Blais, Wisecrack
- Charlotte Cardin, 99 Nights
- Cindy Lee, Diamond Jubilee
- Corridor, Mimi
- Helena Deland, Goodnight Summerland
- Annie-Claude Deschênes, Les Manières de table
- DijahSB, The Flower That Knew
- Jeremy Dutcher, Motewolonuwok
- Elisapie, Inuktitut
- Devours, Homecoming Queen
- Ducks Ltd., Harm's Way
- Dominique Fils-Aimé, Our Roots Run Deep
- La Force, XO Skeleton
- Shane Ghostkeeper, Songs for My People
- Beverly Glenn-Copeland, The Ones Ahead
- Karkwa, Dans la seconde
- Kaytraminé, Kaytraminé
- KEN Mode, Void
- Sean Leon, In Loving Memory
- Terra Lightfoot, Healing Power
- Loony, Loony
- Jon McKiel, Hex
- Myst Milano, Beyond the Uncanny Valley
- NOBRO, Set Your Pussy Free
- Nyssa, Shake Me Where I'm Foolish
- Pelada, Ahora más que nunca
- Peter Peter, Éther
- Population II, Électrons libres du Québec
- Allison Russell, The Returner
- La Sécurité, Stay Safe!
- Arielle Soucy, Il n'y a rien que je ne suis pas
- Super Duty Tough Work, Paradigm Shift
- Talk, Lord of the Flies & Birds & Bees
- TEKE::TEKE, Hagata
- Tobi, Panic
- Tomb Mold, The Enduring Spirit

== Polaris Heritage Prize ==
Nominees for the Slaight Family Polaris Heritage Prize, an award to honour classic Canadian albums released before the creation of the Polaris Prize, were announced at the main Polaris Prize ceremony. The winners were Jackie Mittoo for his album Macka Fat and Tegan and Sara for their album So Jealous.

- Tegan and Sara, So Jealous - Public Vote
- Jackie Mittoo, Macka Fat - Jury Prize
- Robert Charlebois and Louise Forestier, Lindberg
- Julie Doiron and The Wooden Stars, Julie Doiron and the Wooden Stars
- Sarah Harmer, You Were Here
- The Inbreds, Kombinator
- Daniel Lanois, Acadie
- Jean Leloup, Le Dôme
- The Oscar Peterson Trio, Canadiana Suite
- Robbie Robertson, Robbie Robertson
- Slow, Against the Glass
- The Weakerthans, Reconstruction Site
