= Inuktitut (album) =

Studio album by Elisapie
- Released: September 15, 2023
- Genre: Pop
- Length: 43:35
- Label: Bonsound

Elisapie chronology
Eaux turbulentes (2020)	Inuktitut (2023)

Inuktitut is the fourth studio album by Inuk-Canadian singer-songwriter Elisapie, released in 2023. The album consists of ten Inuktitut language covers of classic pop and rock songs that Elisapie described as connected to a significant personal memory.

== Production ==
According to Elisapie, she had considered other songs for the project as well, including songs by Pearl Jam and Counting Crows, but chose to proceed only with songs that inspired moments of personal reflection when she relistened to them. She has also stated that she viewed the project as an opportunity to build bridges between Inuit and non-Inuit cultures, stating that hearing a familiar song redone in an unfamiliar language helps to create curiosity and build personal alliances.

She stated that her proudest moment during the recording sessions was when she successfully secured permission from Robert Plant and Jimmy Page to record her version of Led Zeppelin's "Going to California", as both Page and Plant are notoriously reluctant to license their music too frequently.

== Awards ==
Elisapie won the Juno Award for Contemporary Indigenous Artist of the Year at the Juno Awards of 2024, and the album was a shortlisted finalist for the 2024 Polaris Music Prize.

Carolyne De Bellefeuille, Jessica Ledoux, Mali Savaria-Ille, Veronique Lafortune and Leeor Wild also received a Juno nomination for Album Artwork of the Year.

The album won the Félix Award for Interpretive Album of the Year at the 46th Félix Awards.

== Track listing ==
Inuktitut track listing
No.	Title	Writer(s)	Length
1.	"Isumagijunnaitaungituq" ("The Unforgiven")	James Hetfield; Kirk Hammett; Lars Ulrich	4:33
2.	"Sinnatuumait" ("Dreams")	Stevie Nicks	4:27
3.	"Taimangalimaaq" ("Time After Time")	Cyndi Lauper; Rob Hyman	4:13
4.	"Qimatsilunga" ("I Want to Break Free")	John Deacon	4:03
5.	"Qaisimalaurittuq" ("Wish You Were Here")	David Gilmour; Roger Waters	4:42
6.	"Californiamut" ("Going to California")	Jimmy Page; Robert Plant	3:33
7.	"Uummati Attanarsimat" ("Heart of Glass")	Debbie Harry; Chris Stein	3:58
8.	"Inuuniaravit" ("Born to Be Alive")	Patrick Hernandez	3:33
9.	"Taimaa Qimatsiniungimat" ("Hey, That's No Way to Say Goodbye")	Leonard Cohen	4:34
10.	"Qimmijuat" ("Wild Horses")	Mick Jagger; Keith Richards	5:59
Total length:			43:35

== Charts ==
Chart performance for Inuktitut
Chart (2023)	Peak position
Canadian Albums (Billboard)	14
