= Norman Wong (photographer) =

Canadian photographer and music video director

Norman Wong is a Canadian photographer and music video director. He is most noted for receiving a Juno Award nomination for Video of the Year at the Juno Awards of 2022, for his video for Charlotte Cardin's single "Meaningless".

Wong began his career as a photographer for Broken Social Scene and Arts & Crafts Productions. In 2013, alongside the release of the anniversary compilation Arts & Crafts: X, the label also staged a public exhibition of 10 of Wong's photographs. He has since had other photography credits for brands and celebrities, notably a pop-up portrait studio at the Juno Awards of 2015 and the cover for Drake's 2018 album Scorpion.

As a video director, his most noted credits prior to Cardin were the videos for "Crater" by Gord Downie and The Sadies and "The Bells" by Lowell.
