= Lubalin =

Canadian musician

Lubalin is a Canadian singer, musician, and video producer from Montreal, Quebec. He is known for sharing humorous videos on TikTok and his appearances on The Tonight Show Starring Jimmy Fallon and The Kelly Clarkson Show.

== Early life ==
Lubalin is from Montreal, Quebec.

== Musical career ==
Lubalin was initially a R&B/pop musician before his production of humorous videos attracted wider attention .

His 2020 series of "internet drama" videos attracted over 5 million followers and over 200 million views, and got him invited on to The Tonight Show Starring Jimmy Fallon and The Kelly Clarkson Show. Lubalin is signed with record label Cult Nation. He also worked as a producer and songwriting collaborator on labelmate Charlotte Cardin's 2023 album 99 Nights, for which he was a dual Juno Award nominee for Songwriter of the Year and Producer of the Year at the Juno Awards of 2024.

== Discography ==
=== Studio albums ===
- haha, no worries (2024)

=== Singles ===
- Listen (2018)
- All in My Head (2018)
- You Don't (2018)
- Wake Up (2018)
- Night Moves (2018)
- Don't Think (2018)
- Don't Mind Me (2018)
- Too Much (2018)
- Spinning (2018)
- Floating (2018)
- Letting Go (2018)
- Too High (2018)
- I Don't Even Know What I Want (2019)
- Uh Oh (2019)
- cycle (2020)
- long txts (2021)
- double helix (2021)
- Which Salad Dressing Is Your Favourite? (ft. Alison Brie and Jimmy Fallon) (2021)
- Phoenix (Reprise) (Charlotte Cardin cover) (2021)
- More More More (2021)
- dougie jones (2022)
- nobody else (2022)
- just love (2024)
- you know me (2024)
- trust issues (2024)

=== EPs ===
- Lubalin EP (2020)
- internet drama (2020)
  - "is this available?"
  - "she stole my broccoli"
  - "i just need butter"
  - "15,000 pound horse"
  - "can u get pregante..?"
  - "do you wash your legs?"
  - "dear diary"
- Whose Love (2022)
