= Elisapie =

Canadian musician (born 1977)

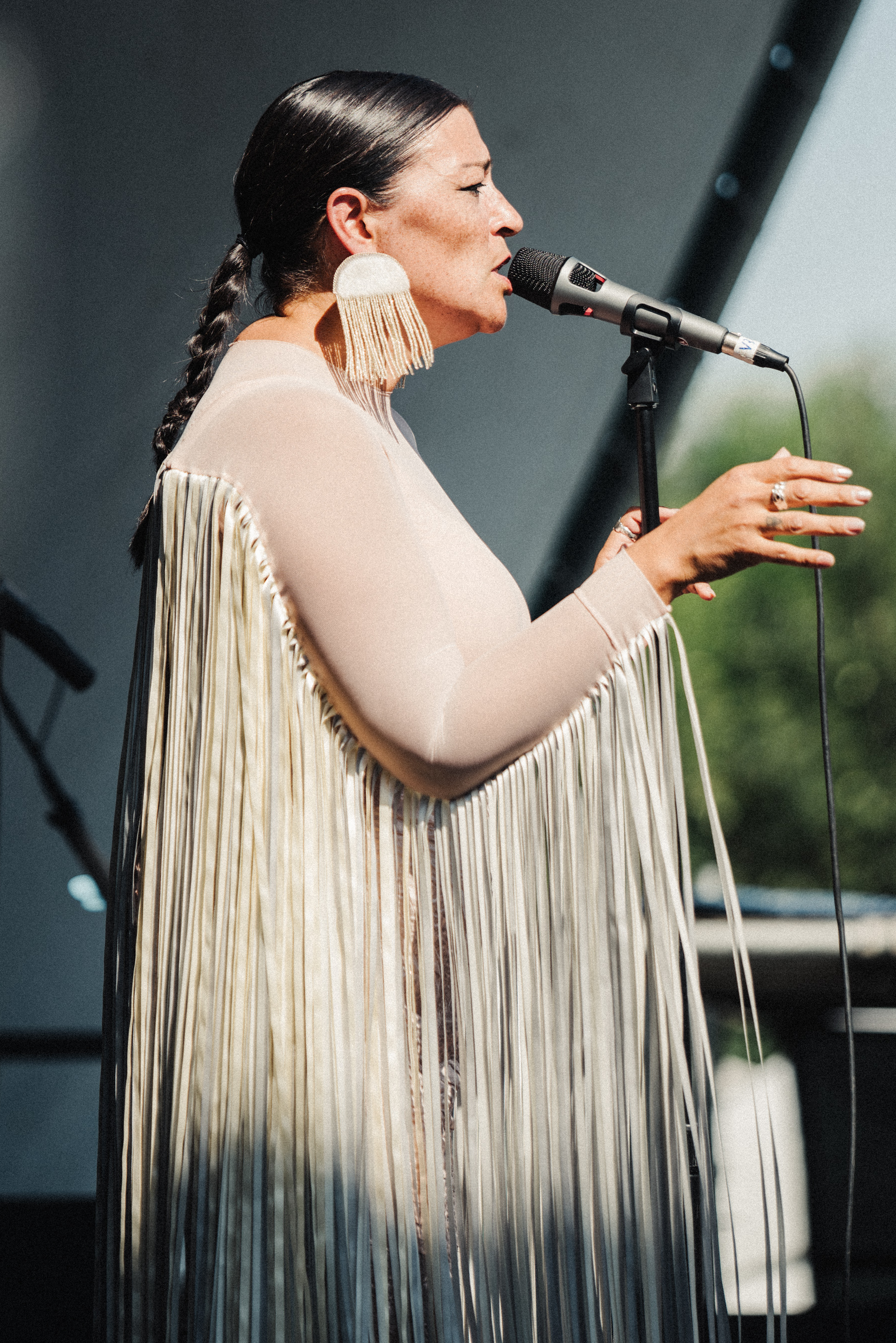
- Elisapie performing in 2024
- Born: Elisapie Isaac; 1977 (age 48–49); Moose Factory, Ontario, Canada
- Occupations: Musician; documentary filmmaker
- Years active: 1989—present
- Musical career
- Instrument: Vocals
- Formerly of: Sugluk; Taima
- Website: elisapie.com

Elisapie Isaac (also known simply as Elisapie; syllabics: ᐃᓕᓴᐱ; born 1977) is a Canadian Inuk musician, broadcaster, documentary filmmaker, activist, and actress. She spent her childhood in Salluit, Nunavik, Quebec, and moved to Montreal in 1999 to pursue communication studies in order to become a journalist.

== Biography ==
Elisapie was born in Moose Factory, Ontario, to an Inuk mother and a father from Newfoundland. She was adopted at birth and raised by Anglican parents in Salluit, QC who were distant relatives of her biological mother, Eva Audlaluk, a host at the local branch of a northern radio network.

She grew up listening to Christian hymns translated into Inuktitut. She performed at age 12 with the Salluit band Sugluk, one of whose members was her uncle George Kakayuk. Her music aspirations led her to move to Montreal in her early 20s, where she formed the musical duo Taima with the instrumentalist Alain Auger. The act's name is Inuktitut for "that's all" or "it is done". The band's sole album, Taima, won the Juno Award for Aboriginal Recording of the Year in 2005.

In 2010, Isaac's first solo album, There Will Be Stars, was released by Pheromone Recordings. On the album, she sings in English, French, and Inuktitut. Her second solo album, Travelling Love, was released in October 2012 under the name Elisapie. During the Juno Awards, she was mistakenly nominated as Breakthrough Artist of the Year, before it was revealed that she had been a Juno winner in 2005; the nomination was rescinded and given to Shawn Hook instead. She garnered a Canadian Screen Award nomination for Best Original Song at the 2nd Canadian Screen Awards for her song "Far Away", which appeared in the film The Legend of Sarila. At the Juno Awards of 2019, her album The Ballad of the Runaway Girl was nominated for the Indigenous Music Album of the Year. In July 2019, the album was shortlisted for the 2019 Polaris Music Prize. This album again contained lyrics in English, French, and Inuktitut.

Isaac has an extensive background in media production as well. When asked about her work in this medium in relation to her music, she has stated "I really believe that communication and radio was really a place for me to express my inner creativity, and I love that medium. And it has helped me to be a little more aware, especially when I have to be doing interviews and have a larger vision of my work than just the artiste point of view".

In 2021, Isaac was announced to have landed her first onscreen acting role, in C.S. Roy's forthcoming augmented reality film, V F C. She also had a part in the television crime drama series Motel Paradis in 2022.

In 2023, she released the album Inuktitut, consisting of ten Inuktitut-language covers of classic pop and rock songs.She won the award for Contemporary Indigenous Artist of the Year at the Juno Awards of 2024, and Best Adult Alternative Album at the Juno Awards of 2025. The album was a shortlisted finalist for the 2024 Polaris Music Prize.

On June 13, 2024, Canada Post released a series of stamps titled "Indigenous Leaders". One of them is dedicated to Isaac, marking her cultural contributions.

== Film ==
Isaac's 2003 National Film Board of Canada documentary If the Weather Permits, filmed in Kangiqsujuaq, northern Quebec, looks at the changing lifestyles of Inuit in Nunavik. The film received several awards, including the Claude Jutra Award for best new director at the Rendez-vous du cinéma québécois, and the Rigoberta Menchú Prize at the First Peoples' Festival. It is included in the 2011 Inuit film anthology Unikkausivut: Sharing Our Stories.

In 2016, she had an acting role in Marc Séguin's film Stealing Alice. In 2026, Isaac and Séguin collaborated on the short animated film Piluk, which is slated to premiere at the 79th Locarno Film Festival.

== Personal life ==
Isaac dated actor Patrice Robitaille from 2003 to 2011. In 2006, she gave birth to a daughter. She also has a son, born in 2014. In February 2018, she revealed that she was pregnant with her third child, a boy.

== Awards and nominations ==
| Year | Award | Category | Nominee/Work | Result | Ref |
|---|---|---|---|---|---|
| 2005 | Juno Award | Aboriginal Recording of the Year | Taima | Won | |
| 2014 | Canadian Screen Award | Best Original Song | "Far Away" (The Legend of Sarila) | Nominated | |
| 2019 | Juno Award | Indigenous Music Album of the Year | The Ballad of the Runaway Girl | Nominated | |
| 2019 | Polaris Music Prize | Long List, Short List | The Ballad of the Runaway Girl | Nominated | |
| 2019 | Félix Award | Indigenous Artist of the Year | Elisapie | Nominated | |
| 2020 | Félix Award | Indigenous Artist of the Year | Elisapie | Won | |
| 2023 | Juno Awards | Contemporary Indigenous Artist of the Year | Inuktitut | Won | |
| 2024 | Polaris Music Prize | Shortlist | Inuktitut | Nominated | |

== Discography ==
with Taima

- Taima (2004)

Solo

- There Will Be Stars (2010)
- Travelling Love (2012)
- The Ballad of the Runaway Girl (2018)
- Eaux turbulentes (2020) – television soundtrack, with Frédéric Levac
- Inuktitut (2023)

== Filmography ==
=== Acting roles ===
| Year | Title | Role | Notes | Ref. |
|---|---|---|---|---|
| 2008 | The Necessities of Life | Inuit mother | | |
| 2013 | The Legend of Sarila | Sedna | Voice | |
| 2020 | Soul | Miali | Voice | |
| 2022 | Motel Paradis | Sabrina Bérubé-Caron | | |
| 2023 | V F C | | | |
| 2026 | North of North | Herself | Guest appearance | |

=== Filmmaking roles ===
| Year | Title | Credited as | | Notes | Ref. |
| Year | Title | Director | Writer | Notes | Ref. |
|---|---|---|---|---|---|
| 2003 | If the Weather Permits | Yes | Yes | Short documentary film | |
