= Sugluk (band) =

Canadian rock band

- Origin: Salluit, Quebec, Canada
- Genres: Rock
- Past members: George Kakayuk; Tayara Papigatuk; Elisapie Isaac

Sugluk (variously styled Sugluc, SUGLUC, or the Sugluk Group) were a Canadian rock band based in northern Quebec. Led by singer George Kakayuk and guitarist Tayara Papigatuk, the group toured extensively through the 1970s and 1980s and recorded two singles with the Canadian Broadcasting Corporation's Northern Service in 1975. The band wrote songs in both English and Inuktitut. They were formed in Salluit, Quebec (formerly known as Sugluk) in the early 1970s and reunited in 2013. Salluit-born pop singer Elisapie Isaac, who is Kakayuk's niece, performed with the band in her youth.

== Recordings ==
The only recordings by the group are two 45 RPM singles recorded by the CBC's Northern Service in 1975.

- "Attama Onnikansigit" (My Father's Story) b/w "Sunamiq Pigumavit" (What Do You Want?)/ "Ajuinarasuasuga" (I Tried Hard), 7", CBC Northern Service, 1975
- "Fall Away / I Didn't Know" b/w "Ballad of the Running Girl / Little Boy" 7", CBC Northern Service, 1975

The tracks "Fall Away", "I Didn't Know", and "Ajuinarasuasuga" appear on the 2014 compilation album Native North America, Vol. 1.
