= Juno Award for Songwriter of the Year =

Canadian music award

The Juno Award for "Songwriter of the Year" has been awarded since 1971, as recognition each year for the best songwriter in Canada. It was also known as the Juno Award for "Composer of the Year" from 1975 to 1990.

Formerly presented for a single song, in its contemporary form the award is presented for two or three songs by the same songwriter; as long as the songwriter is Canadian, they may be nominated for songs that were recorded or performed by non-Canadian artists. Songwriting collaborators share in the nomination if they are both Canadian and common to all of the nominated songs; collaborators will be acknowledged, but not formally included in the nomination, if they did not share credit on all of the nominated songs or if they are not Canadians.

At the Juno Awards of 2025, a new category was introduced for Juno Award for Songwriter of the Year (Non-Performer), to better distinguish artists who perform their own self-written material from songwriters who wrote material for other artists.

== Winners ==
=== Best Songwriter (1971 - 1974) ===
- 1971 - Gene MacLellan (Special Award Canadian Composer)
- 1972 - Rich Dodson
- 1973 - Gordon Lightfoot
- 1974 - Murray McLauchlan

=== Composer of the Year (1975 - 1990) ===
- 1975 - Paul Anka
- 1976 - Hagood Hardy, "The Homecoming"
- 1977 - Gordon Lightfoot, "The Wreck of the Edmund Fitzgerald"
- 1978 - Dan Hill (Co-composer), "Sometimes When We Touch"
- 1979 - Dan Hill (Co-composer), "Sometimes When We Touch"
- 1980 - Frank Mills, "Peter Piper"
- 1981 - Eddie Schwartz, "Hit Me with Your Best Shot"
- 1982 - Mike Reno / Paul Dean, "Turn Me Loose"
- 1983 - Bob Rock / Paul Hyde, "Eyes of a Stranger"
- 1984 - Bryan Adams / Jim Vallance, "Cuts Like a Knife"
- 1985 - Bryan Adams / Jim Vallance
- 1986 - Jim Vallance
- 1987 - Jim Vallance
- 1989 - Tom Cochrane
- 1990 - David Tyson / Christopher Ward

=== Songwriter of the Year (1991 - 1998) ===
- 1991 - David Tyson
- 1992 - Tom Cochrane
- 1993 - k.d. lang / Ben Mink
- 1994 - Leonard Cohen
- 1995 - Jann Arden
- 1996 - Alanis Morissette
- 1997 - Alanis Morissette (Glen Ballard, co-songwriter)
- 1998 - Sarah McLachlan with Pierre Marchand, "Building a Mystery" by Sarah McLachlan

=== Best Songwriter (1999 - 2002) ===
Year	Winner(s)	Songs	Nominees	Ref.
1999	Bryan Adams	"On a Day Like Today", "When You're Gone"	Loreena McKennitt — "The Mummer's Dance"; Ed Robertson — "One Week"; Amy Sky — "Love Pain and the Whole Damn Thing", "Heaven", "Ordinary Miracles"; Shania Twain — "Don't Be Stupid (You Know I Love You)", "From This Moment On", "You're Still the One"	
2000	Shania Twain	"Man! I Feel Like a Woman!", "You've Got a Way", "That Don't Impress Me Much"	Tal Bachman — "If You Sleep", "She's So High"; Bruce Cockburn — "Last Night of the World", "Mango", "Pacing the Cage"; Amanda Marshall — "Believe in You", "If I Didn't Have You", "Love Lift Me"; Alanis Morissette — "So Pure", "Thank U", "Unsent"	
2001	Nelly Furtado	"Turn Off the Light", "I'm like a Bird", "...on the Radio (Remember the Days)"	Bryan Adams — "The Best of Me"; Darrin O'Brien, Robbie Patterson — "Everybody Wants to Be Like You", "Joke Thing", "Nothin' On Me"; Steven Page, Ed Robertson — "Pinch Me", "Too Little Too Late", "Falling For The First Time"; Blaise Pascal — "Angel Baby", "10 Feet High", "Rush"	
2002	Jann Arden	"Never Mind", "Thing for You"	Leonard Cohen — "Boogie Street", "In My Secret Life", "You Have Loved Enough"; Sarah Harmer — "Don't Get Your Back Up", "Hideout", "Uniform Grey"; Ron Sexsmith — "April After All", "Just My Heart Talking", "This Song"; Rufus Wainwright — "Cigarettes and Chocolate Milk", "Grey Gardens", "Poses"	

=== Songwriter of the Year (2003 - Present) ===
Year	Winner(s)	Songs	Nominees	Ref.
2003	Chad Kroeger and Nickelback	"Hero", "Too Bad", "How You Remind Me"	Avril Lavigne – "Complicated", "I'm with You", "Sk8er Boi"; Ron Sexsmith – "Former Glory", "Gold in Them Hills", "These Days"; Remy Shand – "Burning Bridges", "Take a Message", "The Way I Feel"; Shania Twain with Robert John "Mutt" Lange – "I'm Gonna Getcha (Good)"	
2004	Sarah McLachlan	"World on Fire", "Fallen", "Stupid"	Kathleen Edwards — "Six O'clock News", "Hockey Skates", "Mercury"; Nelly Furtado — "Saturdays", "Powerless (Say What You Want)", "Childhood Dreams"; Ron Sexsmith — "You Were There", "On a Whim", "Someway Somehow"; Hawksley Workman — "Anger As Beauty", "We Will Still Need a Song", "Smoke Baby"	
2005	Ron Sexsmith	"Whatever It Takes", "Not About to Lose", "Hard Bargain"	Buck 65 — "Wicked and Weird", "463", "Sore"; Marc Jordan — "Let's Waste Some Time", "Shot Down My Heart", "Tears of Hercules"; Avril Lavigne — "Don't Tell Me", "My Happy Ending", "Nobody's Home"; Gordie Sampson — "Sunburn", "Paris", "You (Or Somebody Like You)"	
2006	Arcade Fire	"Neighborhood #3 (Power Out)", "Rebellion (Lies)", "Wake Up"	Kathleen Edwards — "Back to Me", "Copied Keys", "In State"; Joel Plaskett — "Happen Now", "Lying on a Beach", "Natural Disaster"; Ron Sexsmith — "Lemonade Stand", "Listen", "One Less Shadow"; Neil Young — "The Painter", "Prairie Wind", "When God Made Me"	
2007	Gordie Sampson	"Jesus, Take the Wheel", "Words Get in the Way", "Crybaby"	Sarah Harmer — "I Am Aglow", "Oleander", "Escarpment Blues"; k-os — "Sunday Morning", "The Rain", "Flypaper"; Nickelback — "Far Away", "If Everyone Cared", "Rockstar"; Ron Sexsmith — "All in Good Time", "Never Give Up", "Hands of Time"	
2008	Feist	"My Moon My Man", "1234", "I Feel It All"	Daniel Bélanger — "La Fin de l'homme", "Television", "Sports et loisirs"; Avril Lavigne — "Girlfriend", "Keep Holding On", "When You're Gone"; Joel Plaskett — "Fashionable People", "Nothing More to Say", "Face of the Earth"; Rufus Wainwright — "Going to a Town", "Release the Stars", "Do I Disappoint You"	
2009	Dallas Green	"Waiting...", "Sleeping Sickness", "The Girl"	Nathan Ferraro — "Never Again", "Change For You", "Unaware"; Hedley — "Old School", "For the Nights I Can’t Remember", "Never Too Late"; Alanis Morissette — "Underneath", "Not As We", "In Praise of the Vulnerable Man"; Gordie Sampson — "When I Said I Would", "Just a Dream", "Davey Jones"	
2010	K'naan	"Wavin' Flag", "Take A Minute", "If Rap Gets Jealous"	Michael Bublé – "Haven’t Met You Yet", "Hold On"; Emily Haines, James Shaw – "Gimme Sympathy", "Sick Muse", "Help I’m Alive"; Carly Rae Jepsen, Ryan Stewart – "Tug of War", "Bucket", "Money and the Ego"; Joel Plaskett – "Through & Through & Through", "Deny, Deny, Deny", "All the Way Down the Line"	
2011	Arcade Fire	"Ready to Start", "Sprawl II (Mountains Beyond Mountains)", "We Used To Wait"	Drake – "Fireworks", "Over", "Show Me a Good Time"; Hannah Georgas – "Chit Chat", "The Deep End", "Lovers Breakdown"; Sarah McLachlan – "Forgiveness", "Illusions of Bliss", "Loving You Is Easy"; Royal Wood – "On Top of Your Love", "Tonight I Will Be Your Guide", "Waiting"	
2012	Dallas Green	"Fragile Bird", "We Found Each Other", "Weightless"	Jim Cuddy – "Everyone Watched the Wedding", "Skyscraper Soul", "Watch Yourself Go Down"; Feist – "How Come You Never Go There", "Graveyard", "The Circle Married the Line"; Dan Mangan – "About as Helpful As You Can Be Without Being Any Help at All", "Post-War Blues", "Oh Fortune"; Ron Sexsmith – "Get in Line", "Believe it When I See It", "Middle of Love"	
2013	Leonard Cohen	"Amen", "Going Home", "Show Me the Place"	Arkells – "Michigan Left", "On Paper", "Whistleblower"; Kathleen Edwards – "A Soft Place to Land", "Chameleon/Comedian", "Change the Sheets"; Hannah Georgas – "Enemies", "Robotic", "Somebody"; Afie Jurvanen – "Be My Witness", "Caught Me Thinkin", "Lost in the Light"	
2014	Serena Ryder	"Stompa", "What I Wouldn't Do", "When You Know"	Arcade Fire – "Afterlife", "Here Comes the Night Time", "Reflektor"; Henry "Cirkut" Walter – "Roar", "Timber", "Wrecking Ball"; Ron Sexsmith – "Deepens with Time", "Nowhere to Go", "Snake Road"; Tegan and Sara Quin – "Closer", "I Was a Fool", "Now I'm All Messed Up"	
2015	Afie Jurvanen	"All the Time", "Bitter Memories", "Stronger Than That"	Catherine MacLellan - "Jack's Song", "Tell Me Luella", "The Raven's Sun"; Henry "Cirkut" Walter - "Birthday", "Dark Horse", "Wild Wild Love"; Jenn Grant - "Bring Me a Rose", "No One's Gonna Love You (Quite Like I Do)", "Trailer Park"; Magic! - "Don't Kill the Magic", "Let Your Hair Down", "Rude"	
2016	Abel Tesfaye	"Can't Feel My Face", "In the Night", "The Hills"	Béatrice Martin - "Carry On", "Crier tout bas", "Oceans Brawl"; Dallas Green - "Blood", "Lover Come Back", "Wasted Love"; Tobias Jesso Jr. - "When We Were Young", "Alive", "Without You"; Buffy Sainte-Marie - "Farm in the Middle of Nowhere", "Ke Sakihitin Awasis (I Love You Baby)", "Love Charms (Mojo Bijoux)"	
2017	Gord Downie	"The Stranger", "The Only Place To Be", "Son"	Ruth Berhe - "Lost Boy", "Superficial Love", "2 Poor Kids"; Leonard Cohen - "You Want It Darker", "It Seemed the Better Way", "Traveling Light"; Tegan Quin and Sara Quin - "Boyfriend", "100x", "Stop Desire"; Donovan Woods - "Leaving Nashville", "What Kind of Love Is That", "They Don't Make Anything in That Town"	
2018	Gord Downie, Kevin Drew	"A Natural", "Introduce Yerself", "The North"	Charlotte Cardin — "Main Girl", "Paradise Motion", "The Kids"; Amelia Curran — "Come Back for Me", "Watershed", "Try"; Rose Cousins — "Chosen", "Grace", "White Flag"; Scott Helman — "21 Days", "It's Kinda Complicated", "PDA"	
2019	Shawn Mendes	"Lost in Japan", "Youth", "In My Blood"	Frank Dukes — "Be Careful", "Better Now", "Call Out My Name"; Afie Jurvanen — "No Wrong", "Way With Words", "Any Place"; Jessie Reyez — "Promises", "One Kiss", "Apple Juice"; Donovan Woods — "Our Friend Bobby", "Truck Full of Money", "Next Year"	
2020	Alessia Cara	"Growing Pains", "Out of Love", "Rooting for You"	Tim Baker - "All Hands", "Dance", "The Eighteenth Hole"; Bülow - "Boys Will Be Boys", "Sweet Little Lies", "Two Punks in Love"; Tenille Townes - "I Kept the Roses", "Jersey on the Wall (I'm Just Asking)", "White Horse"; Patrick Watson - "Broken", "Dream for Dreaming", "Here Comes the River"	
2021	Abel Tesfaye, Ahmad Balshe, Jason "DaHeala" Quenneville	"After Hours", "Blinding Lights", "Save Your Tears"	Alanis Morissette — "Ablaze", "Reasons I Drink", "Smiling"; Alessia Cara — "Hell and High Water", "I Choose", "Welcome Back"; Jessie Reyez — "Coffin", "Far Away", "No One's in the Room"; JP Saxe — "A Little Bit Yours", "Golf on TV", "If the World was Ending"	
2022	Abel Tesfaye	"Hurricane", "Moth to a Flame", "Take My Breath"	Mustafa Ahmed — "Air Forces", "The Hearse", "What About Heaven"; Allison Russell — "4th Day Prayer", "Montreal", "Nightflyer"; Tobi — "Off The Drugs", "Shall I Continue", "Too Hot"; Charlotte Day Wilson — "I Can Only Whisper", "If I Could", "Wish It Was Easy"	
2023	Abel Tesfaye	"Less Than Zero", "Out of Time", "Sacrifice"	Faouzia — "Anybody Else", "Puppet", "RIP, Love"; Tate McRae — "Chaotic", "Feel Like Shit", "She's All I Wanna Be"; Tenille Townes — "The Last Time", "When You Need It", "When's It Gonna Happen"; Tobi — "Before We Panic", "Flowers", "Move"	
2024	Aysanabee	"Alone", "Here and Now", "Somebody Else"	Charlotte Cardin, Jason Brando, Lubalin — "Confetti", "Daddy's a Psycho", "Jim Carrey"; Nicholas Durocher, Connor Riddell — "Afraid of the Dark", "A Little Bit Happy", "Wasteland"; William Prince — "Broken Heart of Mine", "Easier and Harder", "When You Miss Someone"; Allison Russell — "Eve Was Black", "Stay Right Here", "The Returner"	
2025	Mustafa	"Name of God", "Leaving Toronto", "I'll Go Anywhere"	AP Dhillon — "Old Money", "Losing Myself", "Bora Bora"; Nemahsis — "stick of gum", "you wore it better", "coloured concrete"; Jessie Reyez — "Child of Fire", "Ridin", "Shut Up"; The Weeknd — "Dancing in the Flames", "Timeless", "São Paulo"	
2026	Daniel Caesar	"Call On Me", "Moon", "Who Knows"	The Beaches — "Can I Call You in the Morning", "Did I Say Too Much", "Lesbian of the Year"; Justin Bieber — "Daisies", "Speed Demon", "Yukon"; Tate McRae — "Purple Lace Bra", "Revolving Door", "Sports Car"; Jessie Reyez — "Cudn't B Me", "Goliath", "Ocean"	
