= Big Boy (EP) =

EP by Charlotte Cardin
- Released: July 15, 2016
- Genres: Pop, electro, jazz
- Length: 18:32
- Label: Cult Nation

Charlotte Cardin chronology
Big Boy (2016)	Main Girl (2017)

Big Boy is the first EP from the Quebec singer Charlotte Cardin, released in 2016. Cardin toured in support of the EP around Canada and the United States in 2017.

== Critical reception ==
According to Unsung Sundays, Cardin's voice on Big Boy is "impeccable" and brings a "sensual" touch to the "French jazz-influenced pop EP", which they also called "delightfully minimal" as well as "single-minded and focused". The instrumentation is referred to as "dripping with atmosphere, and oozing with sensuality." Unsung Sundays also wrote that "the production on the record is deceiving, because it sounds bigger than it is", also commenting that "there isn't a hint of autotune" in Cardin's voice.

Stephen Carlick from Exclaim! believed songs such as "Like it Doesn't Hurt" are "a masterful display of songwriting", referring to Cardin's voice as "smoky, billowing [and sounding] effortless but [hanging] thick in the air". Carlick felt that "Dirty Dirty" "evokes Amy Winehouse" and "Faufile", a French song, is a "powerful, straightforward ballad", but also wrote that the title track "Big Boy" "proves the weakest cut here" and "out-of-time" amongst the other songs presented.

== Track listing ==
No.	Title	Writer(s)	Length
1.	"Big Boy"	Charlotte Cardin	2:56
2.	"Like It Doesn't Hurt" (featuring Nate Husser)	Cardin, Husser	3:37
3.	"Dirty Dirty"	Cardin	3:20
4.	"Talk Talk"	Cardin	3:39
5.	"Les échardes"	Cardin	2:28
6.	"Faufile"	Cardin	2:32
Total length:			18:32

== Charts ==
Chart performance for Big Boy
Chart (2016)	Peak position
Canadian Albums (Billboard)	12
