= Bambii =

Canadian DJ, record producer and songwriter

BAMBII
- Born: Kirsten Azan
- Genres: Dancehall; UK Garage; Jungle; Drum and Bass
- Years active: 2019-present
- Labels: Innovative Leisure, Because Music
- Website: BAMBII.com

Kirsten Azan, known professionally as BAMBII, is a Canadian-Caribbean artist, DJ, record producer and songwriter based in Toronto. Her music combines Caribbean dance music with electronic styles including jungle and UK garage. BAMBII founded the Toronto club event JERK in 2013. Her debut EP, Infinity Club (2023), won Electronic Album of the Year at the 2024 Juno Awards and was shortlisted for the 2024 Polaris Music Prize. Her second EP, Infinity Club II, followed in 2025.

== Early life ==
BAMBII grew up in Toronto and was exposed to reggae and dancehall through her Caribbean heritage, alongside rock, house and punk. Before her music career, BAMBII held jobs in retail, call centres and nonprofit organisations.

In 2013, BAMBII launched JERK, a Toronto party bringing together club music and Caribbean influences. BAMBII organised, promoted and DJed at the event.

== Career ==
BAMBII released her debut track, "Nitevision", featuring Pamputtae, in 2019. BAMBII subsequently contributed production to Kelela's album Raven.

BAMBII released her debut EP, Infinity Club, through Innovative Leisure in 2023. Its guest artists included Aluna and Lady Lykez. The EP won Electronic Album of the Year at the 2024 Juno Awards and was shortlisted for the 2024 Polaris Music Prize.

In 2024, BAMBII released "Shh" and "Spit". BAMBII also toured with Jamie xx and appeared on Shygirl's "Flex", from Club Shy Room 2.

Infinity Club II was released on 20 June 2025 through Because Music. The 12-track EP includes "Mirror", featuring Ravyn Lenae Jessy Lanza and Yaeji, and appearances by Ravyn Lenae, Aluna, BEAM and Lady Lykez.

BAMBII is credited with production and songwriting on JT's "Numb", released on 17 April 2026. In May 2026, BAMBII appeared with Madison Beer on "The Ambition" from Zara Larsson's remix album Midnight Sun: Girls Trip.

== Discography ==
=== Extended plays ===
List of extended plays, with selected details
| Title | Details |
|---|---|
| Infinity Club | Released: 4 August 2023; Label: Innovative Leisure |
| Infinity Club II | Released: 20 June 2025; Label: Because Music |

=== Selected singles ===
| Title | Year | Ref. |
|---|---|---|
| "Nitevision" (featuring Pamputtae) | 2019 | |
| "Twitch" | 2021 | |
| "Ride with Me" | 2022 | |
| "One Touch" | 2023 | |
| "Wicked Gyal" (featuring Lady Lykez) | 2023 | |
| "Shh" | 2024 | |
| "Spit" (featuring BEAM and Lady Lykez) | 2024 | |
| "Mirror" (featuring Jessy Lanza and Yaeji) | 2025 | |
| "Hot Girls" (featuring Che Mario) | 2026 | |
| "Level Up" | 2026 | |
| "Touch Down" | 2026 | |

=== Selected collaborations ===
| Year | Artist | Song or release | Contribution | Ref. |
|---|---|---|---|---|
| 2023 | Kelela | Raven | Production and additional production | |
| 2025 | Shygirl | "Flex" (Club Shy Room 2) | Guest appearance | |
| 2026 | JT | "Numb" | Additional production and songwriting | |
| 2026 | Zara Larsson with Madison Beer | "The Ambition" (Midnight Sun: Girls Trip) | Guest appearance | |
