= Charlotte Cardin =

Canadian singer and songwriter (born 1994)

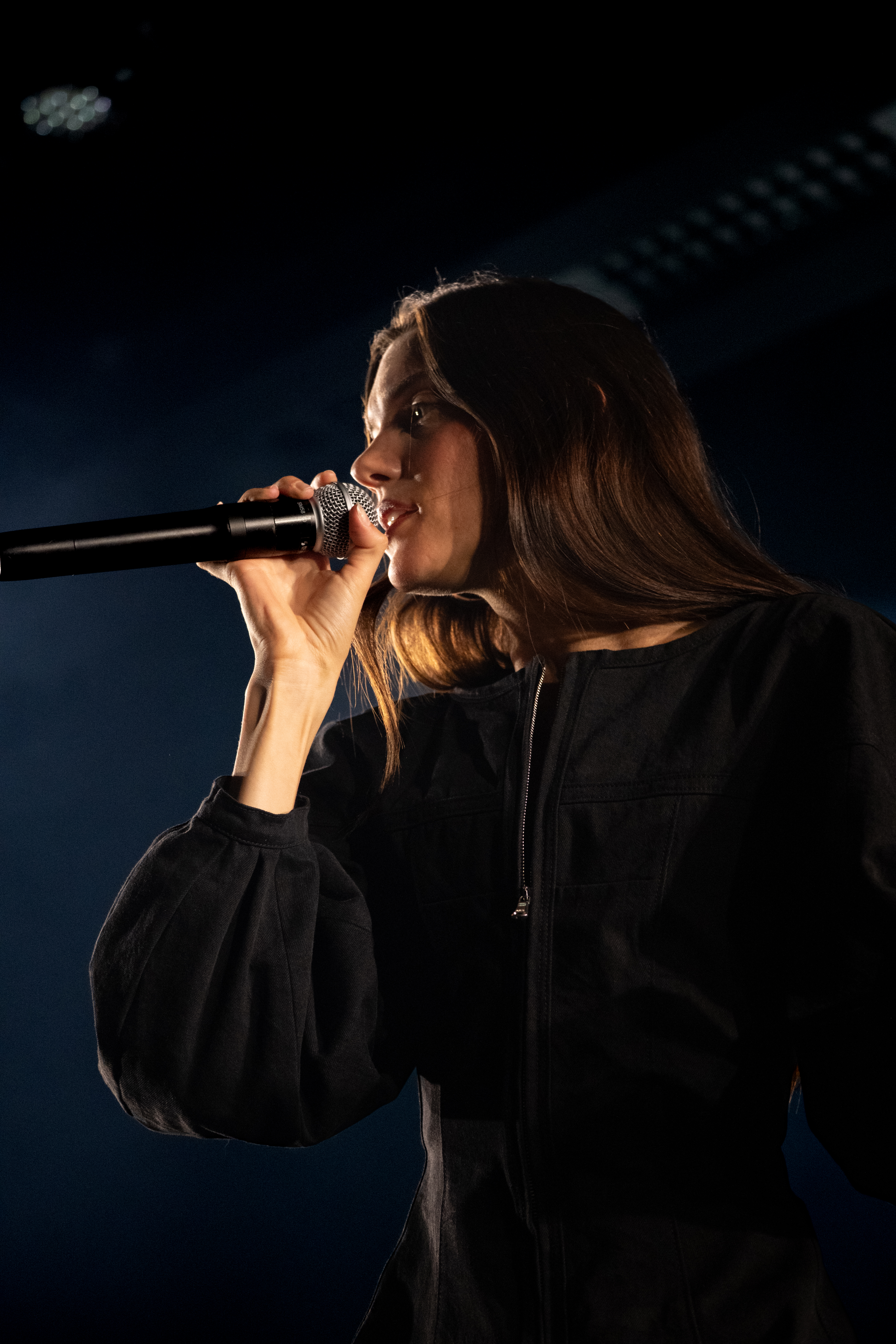
- Cardin performing at the 2026 Montreaux Jazz Festival

Background information
- Born: Charlotte Cardin-Goyer; November 9, 1994 (age 32); Montreal, Quebec, Canada
- Genres: Pop; electro
- Occupations: Singer; songwriter
- Instruments: Vocals; piano
- Years active: 2013–present
- Labels: Cult Nation; Atlantic
- Partner: Aliocha Schneider (2016–present)
- Website: Official website

Charlotte Cardin-Goyer (French pronunciation: [ʃaʁlɔt kaʁdɛ̃ ɡɔje]; born November 9, 1994) is a Canadian singer and songwriter. She has been nominated for 14 Juno Awards. In 2022, she received four awards for Artist of the Year, Single of the Year for her song "Meaningless", Pop Album of the Year and Album of the Year for her 2021 debut album Phoenix. Her second album, 99 Nights, was released in 2023 and won the 2024 Junos for Pop Album of the Year and Album of the Year.

== Career ==
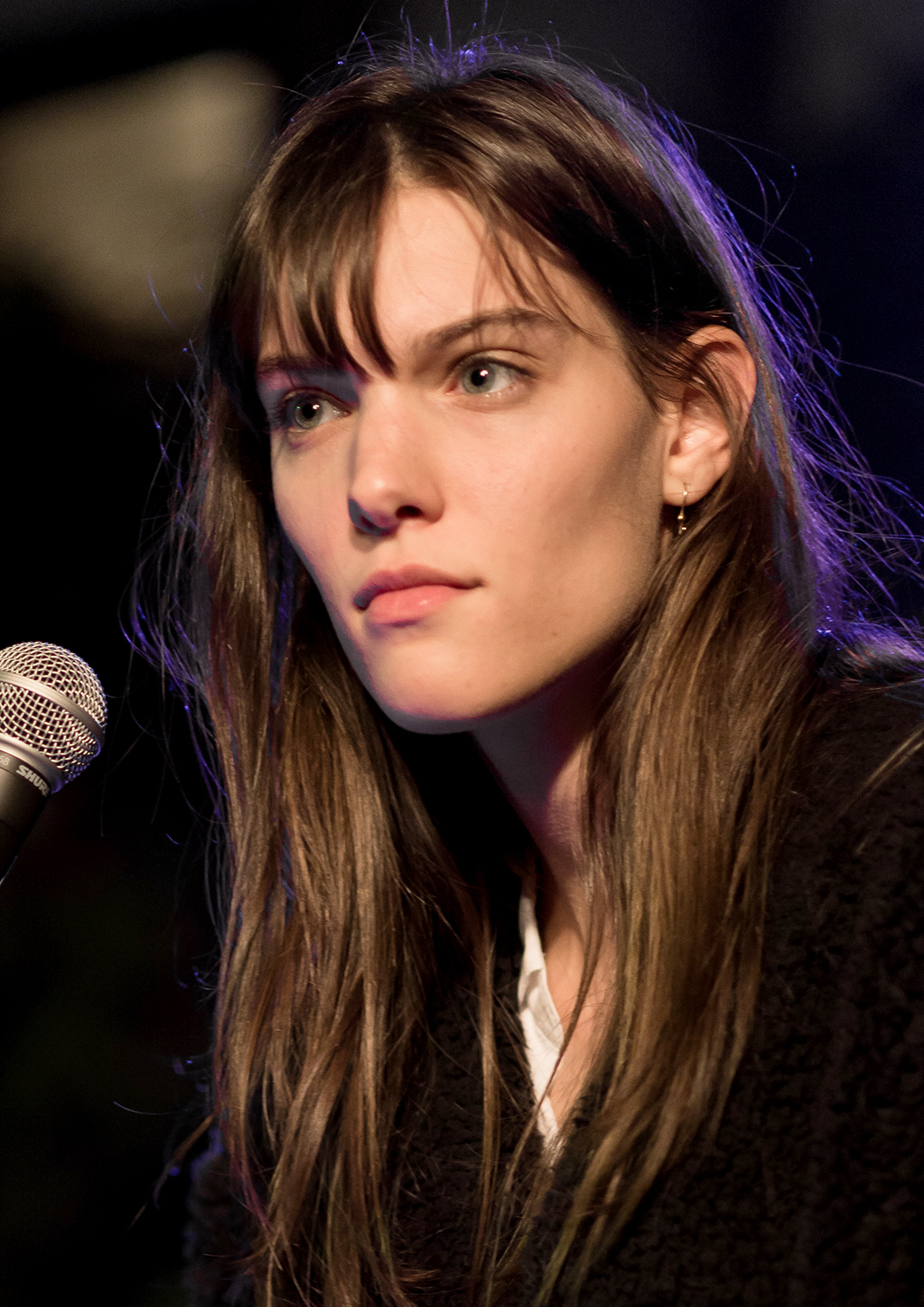
Cardin performing in 2017

Cardin began her career as a model at the age of 15, where she appeared in advertising campaigns, including Barilà. She was a Top 4 finalist in the first season of the TVA singing competition La Voix in 2013, later the same year she was featured on Garou's album Au milieu de ma vie as a duet vocalist on the single "Du vent, des mots". On March 1, 2014, she appeared on the sister series The Voice: la plus belle voix in France to perform the song with Garou, a judge on that edition.

She released her solo debut EP, Big Boy, in 2016 on Cult Nation Records. The EP featured songs in both English and French, and included rapper Nate Husser as a featured artist on "Like It Doesn't Hurt". She was a shortlisted SOCAN Songwriting Prize finalist in the French division for her song "Les échardes", and the title track "Big Boy" was playlisted on CBC Radio 2 and charted on the Radio 2 Top 20. She made an appearance on the talk show Tout le monde en parle to discuss her mini-album in November 2016.

For the 2017 SOCAN Songwriting Prize, she was a nominee in the English category for "Big Boy" and in the French category for "Faufile", becoming the first artist in the history of the award to be nominated in both categories in the same year. In 2017, she released her second EP, Main Girl.

She received two Juno Award nominations at the Juno Awards of 2018, for Breakthrough Artist of the Year and Songwriter of the Year for "Main Girl", "Paradise Motion" and "The Kids". In 2018, she received another SOCAN Songwriting Prize nomination for "Main Girl".

In 2019, Cardin and producer CRi collaborated on a cover of Daniel Bélanger's "Fous n'importe où", and Cardin appeared on Loud's album Tout ça pour ça as a duet vocalist on the track "Sometimes, All the Time". In 2020 she released the singles "Passive Aggressive" and "Daddy"; both tracks were recorded for her full-length debut album Phoenix, which was released on April 23, 2021. Phoenix is co-written with Cardin's longtime manager Jason Brando of Cult Nation.

In 2021, Her debut album Phoenix won the Felix Award for Anglophone Album of the Year at the 43rd Félix Awards. Cardin also won the awards for Anglophone Concert of the Year and Most Successful Artist Outside Quebec. Cardin was the most-nominated artist at the Juno Awards of 2022, receiving nods for Artist of the Year, Album of the Year for Phoenix, Pop Album of the Year for Phoenix, Single of the Year and Video of the Year for "Meaningless", and the Fan Choice Award.

In 2022, Cardin and Pierre Lapointe performed Daniel Lavoie's "Ils s'aiment" at the ceremony inducting Lavoie into the Canadian Songwriters Hall of Fame.

In April 2023, she released "Confetti", the first single from her second album 99 Nights. In June she announced that the album would be released on August 25, 2023.

After the release of the album, she created an EP, Une semaine à Paris, containing four songs: "Real Love", made with artist Laylow, the French version of "Confetti" which had already been released with Confetti and the piano version of the song, "Feel Good", and "Un peu trop". She then released a new EP, A Week in Nashville, containing three songs: "Lonely with Our Love", "I Came Here to Leave You" and "Did Life Work Out for You?".

99 Nights won the Juno Awards for Album of the Year and Pop Album of the Year at the Juno Awards of 2024, and was shortlisted for the 2024 Polaris Music Prize.

In February 2026, she won Female Artist of the Year at the Victoires de la musique in France, joining other previously notable Québecois winners such as Céline Dion, Garou and Isabelle Boulay.

== Personal life ==
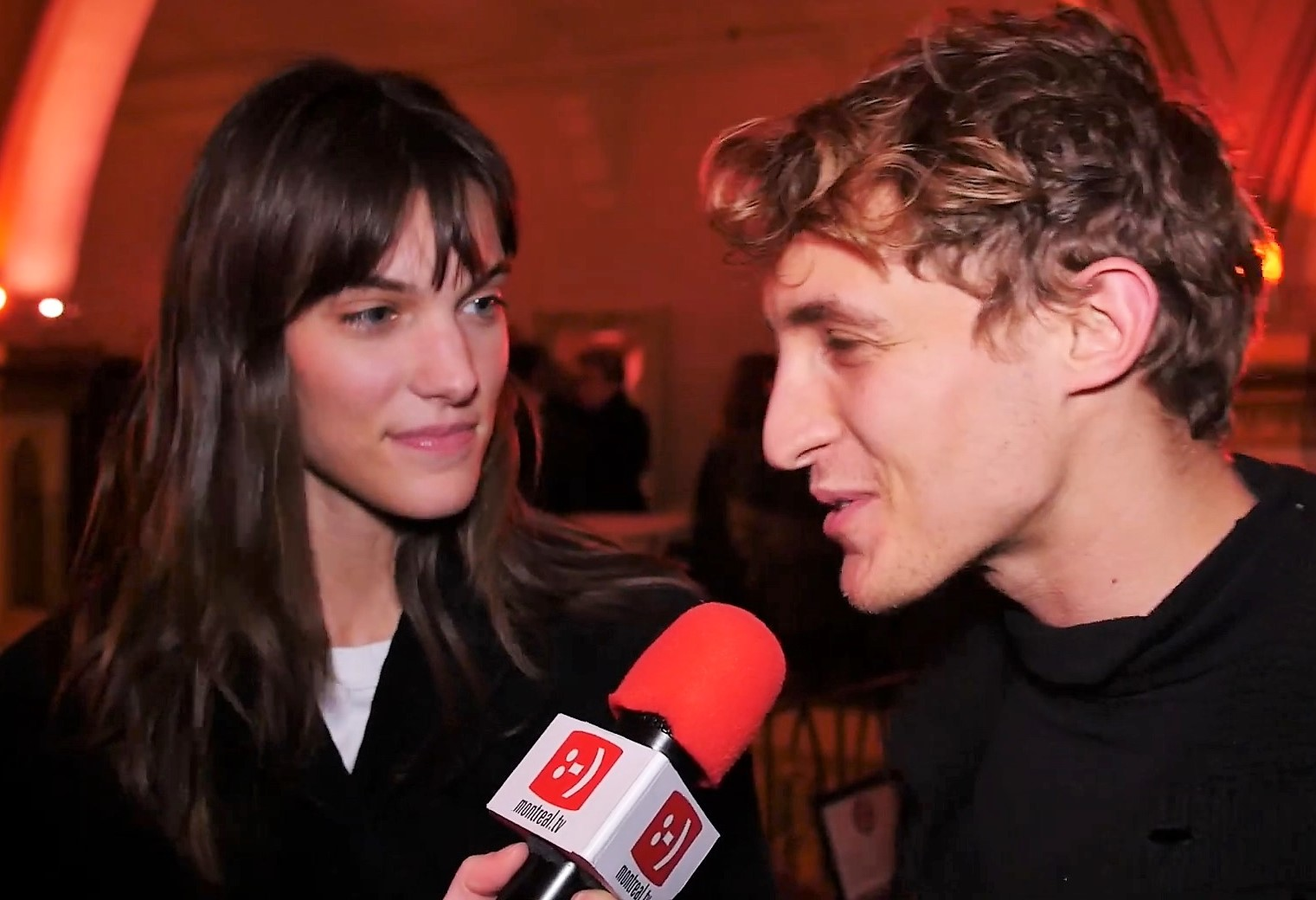
Cardin with Aliocha Schneider (2018)

Cardin grew up in the Town of Mount Royal on the island of Montreal, in a francophone family. She grew up speaking French and English, and is fluent in both languages.

Cardin has been in a relationship with French-Canadian actor and singer-songwriter Aliocha Schneider since 2016. She can be heard on Schneider's song "Avant elle", where she provides supporting vocals. In 2024, the couple also began performing a duet version of the song "Ensemble".

== Band members ==
- Benjamin Courcy – drums
- Mathieu Sénéchal – bass guitar, musical director and co-writer of "Daddy"

== Discography ==
=== Studio albums ===
List of studio albums, with selected chart positions
Title	Details	Peak chart positions				Certifications
Title	Details	CAN	BEL (WA)	FRA	SWI	Certifications
Phoenix	Released: April 23, 2021; Label: Atlantic/Cult Nation; Formats: CD, LP, digital download, streaming	1	23	26	30	MC: 2× Platinum; SNEP: Gold
99 Nights	Released: August 25, 2023; Label: Atlantic/Cult Nation; Formats: CD, LP, digital download, streaming	3	59	33	—	MC: Platinum; SNEP: Platinum
Midnight, mon amour	Scheduled: January 29, 2027; Label: Atlantic/Cult Nation; Formats: CD, LP, digital download, streaming	To be released				
"—" denotes a recording that did not chart or was not released in that territory.

=== Extended plays ===
List of EPs, with selected chart positions
Title	Details	Peak chart positions		Certifications
Title	Details	CAN	FRA	Certifications
Big Boy	Released: July 15, 2016; Label: Cult Nation; Formats: CD, LP, digital download, streaming	12	—	MC: Gold
Main Girl	Released: September 6, 2017; Label: Atlantic; Formats: CD, LP, digital download, streaming	12	36	MC: Gold
Une semaine à Paris	Released: November 17, 2023; Label: Cult Nation; Formats: CD, LP, digital download, streaming	—	—	
A Week in Nashville	Released: May 17, 2024; Label: Atlantic; Formats: CD, LP, digital download, streaming	—	—	
"—" denotes a recording that did not chart or was not released in that territory.

=== Charted singles ===
==== As lead artist ====
List of charted singles, with selected chart positions
Title	Year	Peak chart positions										Certifications	Album
Title	Year	CAN	CAN AC	CAN CHR	CAN HAC	CAN Rock	BEL (WA)	FRA	MKD Air.	SRB Air.	US Adult	Certifications	Album
"Main Girl"	2017	98	19	—	34	—	— (Note: "Main Girl" did not enter the Ultratop 50, but peaked at number 36 on the Ultratip Bubbling Under 50 chart.)	—	—	—	—	MC: 2× Platinum; SNEP: Gold	Main Girl
"Passive Aggressive"	2020	47	—	49	29	—	—	—	—	—	—	MC: Platinum	Phoenix
"Daddy"	2021	64	—	—	—	—	—	—	—	—	—	MC: Platinum	Phoenix
"Meaningless"	2021	30	33	39	45	—	—	—	—	—	—	MC: 2× Platinum	Phoenix
"Anyone Who Loves Me"	2021	33	—	—	—	—	—	—	—	—	—	MC: Platinum; SNEP: Gold	Phoenix
"Phoenix"	2021	68	—	—	—	—	—	—	—	—	—	MC: 2× Platinum	Phoenix
"Confetti"	2023	10	18	5	4	30	—	—	—	—	20	MC: 4× Platinum; SNEP: Gold	99 Nights
"99 Nights"	2023	74	12	14	9	—	—	—	—	—	—	MC: Platinum	99 Nights
"Jim Carrey"	2023	88	29	—	—	34	—	—	—	—	—	MC: Platinum	99 Nights
"Feel Good"	2023	94	18	—	—	—	3	5	—	—	—	MC: Platinum; SNEP: Diamond	Une semaine à Paris
"Tant pis pour elle"	2025	89	26	—	—	—	11	30	—	—	—	SNEP: Platinum	Midnight, mon amour
"The Way We Touch"	2026	31	7	8	5	—	6	— (Note: "The Way We Touch" did not enter SNEP's single chart, but peaked at number 25 on the SNEP's Top Radio chart.)	1	10	—		Midnight, mon amour
"Memories"	2026	69	25	34	—	—	14	—	—	—	—		Midnight, mon amour
"—" denotes a recording that did not chart or was not released in that territory.

==== As featured artist ====
List of charted singles, with selected chart positions
Title	Year	Peak chart positions		Album
Title	Year	BEL (WA)	FRA	Album
"Du vent, des mots" (Garou featuring Charlotte Cardin)	2014	— (Note: "Du vent, des mots" did not enter the Ultratop 50, but peaked at number 7 on the Ultratip Bubbling Under 50 chart.)	131	Au milieu de ma vie
"Ensemble" (with Aliocha Schneider)	2024	—	37	Aliocha Schneider
"Gordon in the Willows" (with Patrick Watson)	2025	—	—	Uh Oh
"—" denotes a recording that did not chart or was not released in that territory.

=== Other charted and certified songs ===
List of other charted songs, with selected chart positions
Title	Year	Peak chart positions			Certifications	Album
Title	Year	CAN	CAN AC	FRA	Certifications	Album
"Like It Doesn't Hurt" (featuring Nate Husser)	2016	—	—	—	MC: Gold	Big Boy
"Dirty Dirty"	2016	—	—	—	MC: Platinum	Big Boy
"Les échardes"	2016	—	45	—	MC: Gold	Big Boy
"Faufile"	2016	—	—	—	MC: Platinum	Big Boy
"California"	2018	—	46	—		Non-album singles
"Doubleshifts"	2018	—	46	—	MC: Gold	Non-album singles
"Fous n'importe où" (with CRi)	2019	—	38	—		Non-album singles
"Sometimes, All the Time" (Loud featuring Charlotte Cardin)	2019	72	—	—	MC: Gold	Tout ça pour ça
"Sex to Me"	2021	—	—	—	MC: Gold	Phoenix
"Good Girl"	2021	94	—	—		Phoenix
"Sad Girl"	2021	60	—	—		Phoenix
"Memento Interlude" (Dinos featuring Charlotte Cardin)	2021	—	—	155		Stamina, Memento
"Puppy"	2023	77	—	—	MC: Gold	99 Nights
"Next to You"	2023	81	—	—		99 Nights
"—" denotes a recording that did not chart or was not released in that territory.

== Awards and nominations ==
Organization	Year	Work	Award	Result	Ref.
ADISQ	2026	"Tant pis pour elle"	Song of the Year	Nominated	
ADISQ	2026	Herself	Artist of the Year – International Recognition	Nominated	
Billboard Canada Women in Music	2024	Herself	Woman of the Year	Honoree	
Félix Award	2017	"Les échardes"	Song of the Year	Nominated	
Félix Award	2018	"Faufile"	Song of the Year	Nominated	
Félix Award	2021	Phoenix	Anglophone Album of the Year	Won	
Félix Award	2021	The Phoenix Experience	Anglophone Concert of the Year	Won	
Félix Award	2021	Herself	Most Successful Artist Outside Quebec	Won	
Juno Awards	2018	Herself	Songwriter of the Year	Nominated	
Juno Awards	2018	Herself	Breakthrough Artist of the Year	Nominated	
Juno Awards	2022	Herself	Fan Choice	Nominated	
Juno Awards	2022	"Meaningless"	Single of the Year	Won	
Juno Awards	2022	"Meaningless"	Video of the Year	Nominated	
Juno Awards	2022	Phoenix	Album of the Year	Won	
Juno Awards	2022	Phoenix	Pop Album of the Year	Won	
Juno Awards	2022	Herself	Artist of the Year	Won	
Juno Awards	2024	Herself	Fan Choice	Nominated	
Juno Awards	2024	"Confetti"	Single of the Year	Nominated	
Juno Awards	2024	99 Nights	Pop Album of the Year	Won	
Juno Awards	2024	99 Nights	Album of the Year	Won	
Juno Awards	2024	Herself	Artist of the Year	Nominated	
Juno Awards	2024	Herself	Songwriter of the Year	Nominated	
MTV Europe Music Awards	2023	Herself	Best Canadian Act	Nominated	
SOCAN Songwriting Prize	2016	"Les Échardes"	French category	Nominated	
SOCAN Songwriting Prize	2017	"Big Boy"	English category	Nominated	
SOCAN Songwriting Prize	2017	"Faufile"	French category	Nominated	
SOCAN Songwriting Prize	2018	"Main Girl"	English category	Nominated	
