= Juno Award for Children's Album of the Year =

Canadian music award

The Juno Award for Children's Album of the Year has been awarded since 1979 in recognition of the best quality children's performance album released in Canada. Between 1979 and 2002 it was known as Best Children's Album.

It is one of several categories that media reports in September 2024 indicated would be placed on "hiatus" for the Juno Awards of 2025, with the award committee reversing the decision eight days after it was first reported.

== Winners ==
=== Best Children's Album (1979–2002) ===
Year	Winner	Album	Nominees	Ref.
1979	Anne Murray	There's a Hippo in My Tub	Are We There Yet? – Sandy Offenheim (with Family); One Elephant, Deux Éléphants – Sharon Lois & Bram; Canada's Favourite Folk Songs – Various Artists; Polka Dot Door – Various Artists	
1980	Sharon, Lois & Bram	Smorgasbord (album)	Chickery Chick – Sandra Beech; Going Bananas – Mariposa in the Schools Program; I Lost My Pet Lizard – Brenda and Paul Hoffert; Mr. Dressup, For a Song – Ernie Coombs	
1981	Sharon, Lois & Bram	Singing 'n' Swinging	The Cat Came Back – Fred Penner; Listen to Me – Jim & Rosalie; You've Got to Be a Kid to Get In – The Free Rose Corporation; Merry-Go-Round – The Travellers	
1982	Sandra Beech	Inch By Inch	Listen to the Children – Bob Schneider; The Cats – Children's Hour Productions; The Polka Dot Pony – Fred Penner; Big Bird and Oscar the Grouch, Camping in Canada – Various Artists	
1983	Bob Schneider	When You Dream a Dream	Junior Jug Band – Chris & Ken Whiteley; Wake Up, Mr. Dressup – Ernie Coombs and Terry McManus; At the Music Factory – Jim & Rosalie; Valdy's Kid's Record – Valdy	
1984	The Rugrats	Rugrat Rock	Reflections on Crooked Walking – Ann Mortifee; Special Delivery – Fred Penner; Music Builders IV – Music Builders; I Can Do Anything – Sphere Clown Band	
1985	Robert Munsch	Murmel Murmel Munsch	The Magic Singing Animal Farm – Brad MacDonald, Frank Daller and David E. Walden; Snyder the Spider – Paul Hann; Music Builders VI – The Music Builders Chorus; Today's Special – Today's Special; Wee Rockers – Wee Rockers	
1986	Charlotte Diamond	10 Carrot Diamond	Songs + Games for Toddlers – Bob McGrath & Katharine Smithrim; Lots More Junior Jug Band – Chris & Ken Whiteley; Come On In – Eric Nagler	
1987	Bill Usher	Drums!	Family Pie – Kim & Jerry Brodey; Family Album – Rick & Judy; Bananas in His Eyebrows – Roberta Lynne Stones	
1989	Fred Penner Tied Connie Kaldor/Carmen Campagne	Fred Penner's Place and Lullaby Berceuse	Diamonds and Dragons – Charlotte Diamond; Qu'il Y Ait Toujors Le Soleil – Charlotte Diamond; Le Loup du Nord – Matt Maxwell; Mr. Bach Comes To Call – Susan Hammond, The Toronto Boy's Choir, The Studio Arts Orchestra; The Orchestra – Toronto Philharmonia Orchestra/Mark Rubin (Producer)	
1990	Susan Hammond/Barbara Nichol	Beethoven Lives Upstairs	The People On My Street – Bob King; Improvise With Eric Nagler – Eric Nagler; Footeprints – Norman Foote; The Boy Who Wanted To Talk To Whales – Robert Minden Ensemble	
1991	Susan Hammond	Mozart's Magic Fantasy	Une Voix Pour Les Enfants – Carmen Campagne; The Season - A Family Christmas Celebration – Fred Penner; Yes I Can – Sandra Beech; Sing A to Z – Sharon, Lois & Bram	
1992	Classical Kids/Susan Hammond (Producer)	Vivaldi's Ring of Mystery	Swing On A Star – Claire de Lune; Happy Feet – Fred Penner; Children of the Morning – Jack Grunsky	
1993	Jack Grunsky	Waves of Wonder	Something's Fishy at Camp Wiganishie – Al Simmons; Rêves multicolores – Carmen Campagne; Daydreams & Lullabies – Classical Kids/Susan Hammond (Producer); If The Shoe Fits – Norman Foote	
1994	Susan Hammond/Classical Kids	Tchaikovsky Discovers America	The Child's Play Collection Barbara Nichol et.al.; I Can't Sit Down – Eric Nagler; Dream Catcher – Jack Grunsky; Candles, Snow and Mistletoe – Sharon, Lois & Bram	
1995	Raffi	Bananaphone	J'ai tant dansé – Carmen Campagne; Eric's World – Record Eric Nagler; What a Day! – Fred Penner; Jacob Two Two and the Dinosaur – Mordecai Richler	
1996	Al Simmons	Celery Stalks at Midnight	Raffi Radio – Raffi; Philharmonic Fool – Rick Scott; Hallelujah Handel! – Susan Hammond/Classical Kids; The Keeper – Will Millar	
1997	Martha Johnson	Songs from the Tree House	Jumpin' Jack – Jack Grunsky; Walking In The Sun – Jake Chenier; Like A Ripple On The Water – Kim & Jerry Brodey; Maestro Orpheus and the World Clock – R. H. Thomson, created and produced by Joanne Grodzinski and Robert Pennee	
1998	Judy & David	Livin' in a Shoe	The Truck I Bought From Moe – Al Simmons; Enchantée – Carmen Campagne; Chickee's on the Run – Heather Bishop; Planet Lenny – Lenny Graf	
1999	Susan Hammond's Classical Kids	Mozart's Magnificent Voyage	Rendez-Vous Soleil – Claire de Lune; Accordélidon – Danielle Martineau; Musical Mystery Machines – Ken Whiteley; Celebrate the Music – Sandra Beech	
2000	Sharon, Lois and Bram	Skinnamarink TV	Ants In Your Pants, Volume 1 – Douglas John; Les petites merveilles de Fanchon – Fanchon; Play On... – Jam Sandwich (Mary Lambert & Ellen Yeo); Song Of The Unicorn – Susan Hammond's Classical Kids	
2001	Jack Grunsky	Sing & Dance	Annie – Annie Brocoli; Charlotte Diamond's World – Charlotte Diamond; Step To It – Norman Foote; Cradle On The Waves – Teresa Doyle	
2002	Susan Hammond	A Classical Kids Christmas	Call Of The Wild – Aaron Burnett; Chase A Rainbow – J. Paul Adams, Mary Lou Sicoly, George Brasovan; Red's In The Hood – Judy & David; Songs From The Boom Box – Judy & David	All years

No awards ceremony was held in 1988

=== Children's Album of the Year (2003–present) ===
Year	Winner	Album	Nominees	Ref.
2003	Fred Penner	Sing with Fred	Nous Sommes Tous Comme Les Fleurs – Charlotte Diamond; Once Upon A Tune - Volume 3 - Beanstock – Judy & David; Dodo Le Planète Do Dream Songs Night Songs – Pelican Music Project; Let's Play – Raffi	
2004	Connie Kaldor	A Duck in New York City	Like A Flower to the Sun – Jack Grunsky; The Children of Lir – Loretto Reid; Sing Out Summer Fun – Mary Lambert; Dodo la planète do- Dream songs night songs 2 – Pelican Music Project	
2005	Connie Kaldor	A Poodle in Paris	Angela May's Magnificent Musical Menagerie – Angela Kelman; Songs For You – Jennifer Gasoi; MathJam K – Judy & David; The 5 Elements – Rick Scott & Harry Wong	
2006	Tafelmusik Baroque Orchestra	Baroque Adventure: The Quest for Arundo Donax	A Butterfly In Time – CMSM Concert Theatre Productions; Happy All Of The Time – Jake; The Fabulous Song – Michelle Campagne & Davy Gallant; Canada Needs You (Volume One) – Mike Ford	
2007	Jack Grunsky	My Beautiful World	Dinosaurs, Dragons and Me – Donna & Andy; Join The Band – Ken Whiteley; Snooze Music – Rick Scott; Murmel Murmel Munsch! – Robert Munsch	
2008	Jen Gould	Music Soup	This Is Daniel Cook. Here We Are! – Daniel Cook and Friends; Gonna Keep Dancing – Eddie Douglas; Superstars – The Doodlebops; Prokofiev: Peter and the Wolf – the Windsor Symphony Orchestra	
2009	Barenaked Ladies	Snacktime!	FiddleFire! – Chris McKhool; Oui! – Gregg LeRock; Catchy Tune – Jack Grunsky; The Kerplunks – The Kerplunks	
2010	Norman Foote	Love My New Shirt	Action Packed – Bobs & Lolo; I'm Me! – Charlie Hope; We Share The Earth – The Bee's Knees; Walk On – The Kerplunks	
2011	Peter Lenton	Proud Like a Mountain	Encore – Gregg LeRock; The Little Blue Doggy – Michelle Campagne; Number 3 – The Kerplunks; Power To The Little People – The Monkey Bunch	
2012	Charlie Hope	Songs, Stories and Friends: Let's Go Play!	Connecting the Dots – Bobs & LoLo; Sleepy Sky Lullaby – Eddie Douglas; Everyone – Music with BRIAN; My Butterfly/A Capella Lullabies – Vocal Paint	
2013	Emilie Mover	The Stella and Sam Album, ft. Emilie Mover	Always Be A Unicorn – Helen Austin; Chansons pour toutes sortes d’enfants – Henri Godon; Throw a Penny in the Wishing Well – Jennifer Gasoi; One Dancefloor – Marlowe & the MiX	
2014	Helen Austin	Colour It	Sing As We Go! – Charlie Hope; What's the Big Idea?!? – Gary Rasberry; Mon coffret à surprises – Marie-Claude; Coconuts Don't Fall Far From the Tree – Splash'N Boots	
2015	Fred Penner	Where in the World	Wave Your Antlers – Bobs & LoLo; Le chat botté – LuLu et le Matou; Love Bug – Raffi; Happy Times – Splash'N Boots	
2016	The Swinging Belles	More Sheep, Less Sleep	Greatest Hits – Big Block SingSong; Dirty Feet – Bobs & LoLo; Forest Friends’ Nature Club Album – Ginalina; Songs from the Boot – Splash'N Boots	
2017	Diana Panton	I Believe in Little Things	De Tombouctou à Bombay – Kattam; Owl Singalong – Raffi; Big Yellow Tunes – Splash'N Boots; Wordplay – Will Stroet	
2018	Fred Penner	Hear the Music	Greatest Hits, Vol. 3 – Big Block SingSong; Blue Skies – Bobs & LoLo; Love, Kisses and Hugs – Splash'N Boots; The Moblees (Songs from the Hit TV Show) – The Moblees	All years
2019	Splash'N Boots	You, Me and the Sea	Let's Go Bananas – Beppie; It Takes a Village – Ginalina; Dog on the Floor – Raffi; It's Cool to be Kind – Sonshine and Broccoli	
2020	Big Block SingSong	Greatest Hits, Vol. 4	It's GFORCE – GFORCE; This Is Us – Girl Pow-R; A Cheerful Little Earful – Diana Panton; Sharon, Bram & Friends – Sharon & Bram	
2021	Splash'N Boots	Heart Parade	Letters and Numbers — ABC Singsong; J'aime mon école — Njacko Backo and Kalimbas at Work; Small But Mighty — Ginalina; Goodnight to you All: Traditional Lullabies from Ireland & the UK — Charlie Hope	
2022	Garth Prince	Falling in Africa	Ponderosa Bunchgrass and the Golden Rule — The Oot n' Oots; School Days — Maestro Fresh Wes; Walk Off the Earth & Romeo Eats, Vol. 1 — Walk Off the Earth and Romeo Eats; Words Words Words — ABC Singsong	
2023	Walk off the Earth and Romeo Eats	Walk off the Earth and Romeo Eats, Vol. 2	Nice to Meet You — Beppie; Say Hello — Jeremy and Jazzy; Maestro Fresh Wes Presents: Julia the Great — Maestro Fresh Wes and Keysha Freshh; I Am Love — Splash'N Boots	
2024	The Swinging Belles	Welcome to the Flea Circus	ABC Singsong, Big Words; Ginalina, Going Back: Remembered and Remixed Family Folk Songs, Vol. 1; Splash'N Boots, Love-a-By; Young Maestro, Maestro Fresh Wes Presents: Young Maestro Stick to Your Vision for Young Athletes	
2025	Raffi and The Good Lovelies	Penny Penguin	Kym Gouchie, Shun Beh Nats'ujeh: We Are Healing Through Songs; Riley Rocket and MegaBlast, Riley Rocket: Songs from Season One; Walk Off the Earth and Romeo Eats, Buon Appetito; Young Maestro, Maestro Fresh Wes Presents: Young Maestro "Rhyme Travellers"	
2026	Young Maestro	Maestro Fresh Wes Presents: Young Maestro Rhyme Travellers - Back to the Time Machine	Ari Cui Cui, Ari Cui Cui et les jeux d'rôles (Les contes classiques en musique); Ginalina, All the Earth Speaks; Hip Kids Music, Hip Kids Music Vol. 1; Chris McKhool, Little Leaf	
