= Splash'N Boots =

Canadian musical duo

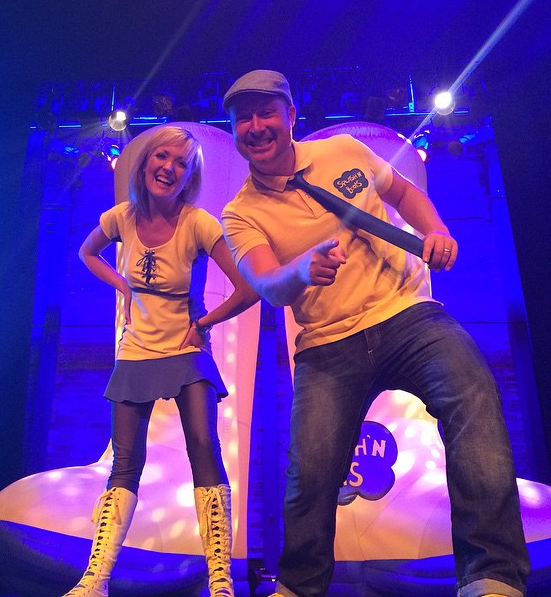

Background information
- Origin: Kingston, Ontario, Canada
- Genres: Children's
- Years active: 2003–present
- Labels: Independent
- Members: Nick Adams; Taes Leavitt
- Website: splashnboots.com

Splash'N Boots is a Canadian children's music duo consisting of Nick Adams (Splash) and Taes Leavitt (Boots). Adams and Leavitt formed Splash'N Boots in 2003 as a class project while studying at Queen's University, in Kingston, Ontario.

In 2014, Splash'N Boots were nominated for their first Juno Award for Children's Album of the Year for their album Coconuts Don't Fall Far from the Tree. They have since been nominated in 2015 for Happy Times, in 2016 for Songs from the Boot, in 2017 for Big Yellow Tunes and in 2018 for Love, Kisses and Hugs and won the award in 2019 for You, Me and the Sea.

In 2007, 2012, and 2014, Splash'N Boots won the SiriusXM Independent Music Award for Children's Artist/Group or Duo of the Year.

Splash'N Boots have a TV series which airs on Treehouse TV.

== Works ==
=== Albums ===
- Getting Our Feet Wet (2003)
- Manatee Bay (2004)
- Popcorn, Pickles, and Parrots (2006)
- Razoo! (2009)
- Back in Yellow (2011)
- Coconuts Don't Fall Far from the Tree (2012)
- Keepin' It Green (2013)
- Happy Times (2014)
- Songs from the Boot (2015)
- Big Yellow Tunes (2016)
- Love, Kisses and Hugs (2017)
- You, Me and the Sea (2018)
- Heart Parade (2020)
- I Am Love (2022)
- Love-a-by (2023)

=== DVDs ===
- The Splash'N Boots Show: Act 1 (2008)
- The Splash'N Boots Show: Act 2 (2011)
- Splash'N Boots Act 2.5: A Whole Lot of Music Videos! (2014)

== Awards and nominations ==
=== Juno Awards ===
Nominated works	Year	Award	Result	Lost to
Coconuts Don't Fall Far From the Tree	2014	Children's Album of the Year	Nominated	Helen Austin – Colour It
Happy Times	2015	Children's Album of the Year	Nominated	Fred Penner – Where in the World
Songs from the Boot	2016	Children's Album of the Year	Nominated	The Swinging Belles - More Sheep, Less Sheep
Big Yellow Tunes	2017	Children's Album of the Year	Nominated	Diana Panton – I Believe in Little Things
Love, Kisses and Hugs	2018	Children's Album of the Year	Nominated	Fred Penner - Hear the Music
You, Me and the Sea	2019	Children's Album of the Year	Won	—
Heart Parade	2021	Children's Album of the Year	Won	—
