= Juno Awards of 2016 =

Canadian music awards ceremony

- The 2016 Juno Awards Logo
- Date: 2–3 April 2016
- Venue: Scotiabank Saddledome, Calgary, Alberta
- Hosted by: Jann Arden and Jon Montgomery

Television/radio coverage
- Network: CTV

The Juno Awards of 2016, honouring Canadian music achievements, were presented in Calgary the weekend of 2–3 April 2016. The ceremonies were held at the Scotiabank Saddledome and televised on CTV. It was the first televised awards show to be broadcast in 4K ultra high-definition.

== Events ==
The primary ceremony hosts were musician Jann Arden and athlete and television personality Jon Montgomery. It included performances by Bryan Adams, Dean Brody, Alessia Cara, Dear Rouge, Coleman Hell, Scott Helman, Shawn Hook, Lights, Shawn Mendes, The Weeknd and Whitehorse. The television broadcast on CTV attracted ratings of 1.4 million viewers.

The Juno Cup charity hockey game was played at Max Bell Centre on 1 April.

== Nominees and winners ==
Musician Burton Cummings is the 2016 inductee into the Canadian Music Hall of Fame. His band, The Guess Who, was inducted in 1987. Rosalie Trombley, former music director for CKLW radio, will be presented with the year's Walt Grealis Special Achievement Award. Arcade Fire is the recipient of the Allan Waters Humanitarian Award for their contributions to various non-profit organizations.

Nominees were announced on 2 February 2016. The lack of female nominees in categories such as Artist of the Year and Album of the Year resulted in social media discussions tagged "#JunosSoMale". Musicians Amy Millan and Grimes were also critical of the gender balance of this year's nominations.

=== People ===
Artist of the Year	Group of the Year
The Weeknd; City and Colour; Drake; Justin Bieber; Shawn Mendes	Walk off the Earth; Hedley; Marianas Trench; Metric; Three Days Grace
Breakthrough Artist of the Year	Breakthrough Group of the Year
Alessia Cara; Coleman Hell; Francesco Yates; Scott Helman; Tobias Jesso Jr.	Dear Rouge; Half Moon Run; Milk & Bone; The Elwins; Young Empires
Fan Choice Award	Songwriter of the Year
Justin Bieber; Alessia Cara; Carly Rae Jepsen; Cœur de pirate; Dean Brody; Drake; Shawn Hook; Shawn Mendes; The Weeknd; Walk off the Earth	Abel Tesfaye - "Can't Feel My Face" (co-songwriters Max Martin, Savan Kotecha, Peter Svensson, Ali Payami), "In the Night" (co-songwriters Ahmad Balshe, Max Martin, Savan Kotecha, Peter Svensson, Ali Payami), "The Hills" (co-songwriters Ahmad Balshe, Emmanuel Nickerson, Carlo Mantagnese) from Beauty Behind the Madness by The Weeknd; Béatrice Martin - "Carry On", "Crier tout bas", "Oceans Brawl" from Roses by Cœur de pirate; Buffy Sainte-Marie - "Farm in the Middle of Nowhere", "Ke Sakihitin Awasis (I Love You Baby)", "Love Charms (Mojo Bijoux)" from Power in the Blood by Buffy Sainte-Marie; Dallas Green - "Blood", "Lover Come Back", "Wasted Love" from If I Should Go Before You by City and Colour; Tobias Jesso Jr. - "When We Were Young" from 25 by Adele; "Alive" from This Is Acting by Sia; "Without You" from Goon by Tobias Jesso Jr.
Producer of the Year	Recording Engineer of the Year
Bob Ezrin - "Honey Honey", "What Love Is All About" from What Love Is All About by Johnny Reid; Dallas Green (co-producer Karl Bareham) - "Lover Come Back", "Wasted Love" from If I Should Go Before You by City and Colour; Henry "Cirkut" Walter - "Locked Away feat. Adam Levine" (co-producer Lukasz "Dr. Luke" Gottwald) from What Dreams Are Made Of by Rock City; "Sugar" (co-producer Joshua "Ammo" Coleman) from V by Maroon 5; Steve Webster & Emilie-Claire Barlow - "La Llorona", "On a Clear Day" from Clear Day by Emilie-Claire Barlow; Thomas "Tawgs" Salter - "Bungalow" from Augusta by Scott Helman; "Rule the World" (co-producer Gianni Luminati) from Sing It All Away by Walk off the Earth	Shawn Everett - "Don't Wanna Fight", "Gimme All Your Love" from Sound & Color by Alabama Shakes; Gus van Go - "Downtown", "Sweet Disaster" from Leave No Bridge Unburned by Whitehorse; Liam O'Neil - "Celebrate", "The Governess" from Pagans in Vegas by Metric; Noah "40" Shebib - "Jungle", "Know Yourself" from If You're Reading This It's Too Late by Drake; Serban Ghenea - "Can't Feel My Face", "In the Night" from Beauty Behind the Madness by The Weeknd

=== Albums ===
Album of the Year	Aboriginal Album of the Year
The Weeknd, Beauty Behind the Madness; Drake, If You're Reading This It's Too Late; Jean Leloup, À Paradis City; Justin Bieber, Purpose; Shawn Mendes, Handwritten	Buffy Sainte-Marie, Power in the Blood; Armond Duck Chief, The One; Black Bear, Come and Get Your Love: The Tribe Session; Derek Miller, Rumble; Don Amero, Refined; The award was rescinded in 2025, over citizenship requirements.
Adult Alternative Album of the Year	Adult Contemporary Album of the Year
Whitehorse, Leave No Bridge Unburned; Daniel Romano, If I've Only One Time Askin'; Joel Plaskett, The Park Avenue Sobriety Test; Mo Kenney, In My Dreams; Tobias Jesso Jr., Goon	Johnny Reid, What Love Is All About; Diana Krall, Wallflower; Don Amero, Refined; Jann Arden, A Jann Arden Christmas; The Tenors, Under One Sky
Alternative Album of the Year	Blues Album of the Year
BRAIDS, Deep in the Iris; Destroyer, Poison Season; Majical Cloudz, Are You Alone?; U.S. Girls, Half Free; Preoccupations (then-known as Viet Cong), Viet Cong	Harrison Kennedy, This Is from Here; Big Dave McLean, Faded But Not Gone; Blackburn Brothers, Brothers in This World; David Gogo, Vicksburg Call; Michael Jerome Browne, Sliding Delta
Children's Album of the Year	Classical Album of the Year – Solo or Chamber Ensemble
The Swinging Belles, More Sheep, Less Sleep; Big Block SingSong, Greatest Hits; Bobs and LoLo, Dirty Feet; Ginalina, Forest Friends' Nature Club Album; Splash'N Boots, Songs from the Boot	James Ehnes, Franck & Strauss: Violin Sonatas; Angela Hewitt, Liszt: Piano Sonata & Sonnets; ARC Ensemble, Chamber Works by Jerzy Fitelberg; Cecilia String Quartet, Mendelssohn: Op. 44 nos. 1, 2; Elinor Frey, Berlin Sonatas
Classical Album of the Year – Large Ensemble or Soloist(s) with Large Ensemble Accompaniment	Classical Album of the Year – Vocal or Choral Performance
Montreal Symphony Orchestra with Olivier Latry and Jean-Willy Kunz, Symphony and New Works for Organ and Orchestra; James Ehnes with the Sydney Symphony, Vivaldi: Four Seasons; Orchestre Métropolitain, Mahler 10; Paul Merkelo, Montreal Symphony Orchestra, Tomasi, Desenclos, Jolivet: French Trumpet Concertos; Stewart Goodyear with the Czech National Symphony, Rachmaninov: Piano Concertos 2 & 3	L'Harmonie des Saisons, Las Ciudades de Oro; Claire de Sévigné, Maria Soulis, and Aradia Ensemble, Vivaldi: Sacred Music, Vol. 4; Canadian Chamber Choir, Sacred Reflections of Canada - A Canadian Mass; Jeff Reilly with Andrea Ludwig, Charles Daniels, John Potter, and Suzie LeBlanc, Peter-Anthony Togni: Responsio; Marie-Nicole Lemieux, Chansons Perpétuelles
Contemporary Christian/Gospel Album of the Year	Country Album of the Year
Dan Bremnes, Where the Light Is; Amanda Cook, Brave New World; Matt Maher, Saints and Sinners; The City Harmonic, We Are; Tim Neufeld, TREES - Chapter 2	Dean Brody, Gypsy Road; Autumn Hill, Anchor; Brett Kissel, Pick Me Up; High Valley, County Line; Paul Brandt, Frontier
Electronic Album of the Year	Francophone Album of the Year
Pomo, The Other Day; AM Static, A Life Well Lived; Concubine, Concubine; Discrete, The Midas Touch; Humans, Noontide	Jean Leloup, À Paradis City; Ariane Moffatt, 22h22; Galaxie, Zulu; Louis-Jean Cormier, Les grandes artères; Marie-Pierre Arthur, Si l'aurore
Instrumental Album of the Year	International Album of the Year
Colin Stetson and Sarah Neufeld, Never Were the Way She Was; Afiara Quartet and Skratch Bastid, Spin Cycle; Cris Derksen, Orchestral Powwow; Esmerine, Lost Voices; Jens Lindemann and Tommy Banks, Legacy Live	Adele, 25; Ciara, Jackie; Hozier, Hozier; Meghan Trainor, Title; Vance Joy, Dream Your Life Away
Jazz Album of the Year – Solo	Jazz Album of the Year – Group
Robi Botos, Movin' Forward; Al Muirhead, It's About Time; Curtis Nowosad, Dialectics; Rich Brown, Abend; Tara Davidson, Duets	Allison Au Quartet, Forest Grove; Brad Turner Quartet, Over My Head; Jerry Granelli Trio, What I Hear Now; Mark Kelso & The Jazz Exiles, Stealing From My Youth; Peripheral Vision, Sheer Tyranny of Will
Vocal Jazz Album of the Year	Heavy Metal Album of the Year
Emilie-Claire Barlow, Clear Day; Alex Pangman, New; Dan Brubeck Quartet, Live from the Cellar; Jaclyn Guillou, This Bitter Earth; Tara Kannangara, Some Version of the Truth	Kataklysm, Of Ghosts and Gods; Cancer Bats, Searching for Zero; Diemonds, Never Wanna Die; Fuck the Facts, Desire Will Rot; KEN mode, Success
Pop Album of the Year	Rock Album of the Year
Justin Bieber, Purpose; Hedley, Hello; Scott Helman, Augusta; Shawn Mendes, Handwritten; Walk off the Earth, Sing It All Away	Death from Above 1979, The Physical World; Bryan Adams, Get Up; Matthew Good, Chaotic Neutral; Nickelback, No Fixed Address; The Sheepdogs, Future Nostalgia
Contemporary Roots Album of the Year	Traditional Roots Album of the Year
Buffy Sainte-Marie, Power in the Blood; Alan Doyle, So Let's Go; Fortunate Ones, The Bliss; Frazey Ford, Indian Ocean; LeE HaRVeY OsMOND, Beautiful Scars; The award was rescinded in 2025, over citizenship requirements.	Pharis and Jason Romero, A Wanderer I'll Stay; J. P. Cormier, The Chance; Jayme Stone, Jayme Stone's Lomax Project; Old Man Luedecke, Domestic Eccentric; The Wainwright Sisters, Songs in the Dark
World Music Album of the Year
Boogat, Neo-Reconquista; Alex Cuba, Healer; Gypsy Kumbia Orchestra, Revuelta Danza Party; The Lemon Bucket Orkestra, Moorka; The Souljazz Orchestra, Resistance

=== Songs and recordings ===
Single of the Year	Classical Composition of the Year
The Weeknd, "Can't Feel My Face"; Alessia Cara, "Here"; Drake, "Hotline Bling"; Justin Bieber, "What Do You Mean?"; Ria Mae, "Clothes Off"	Dinuk Wijeratne, "Two Pop Songs on Antique Poems"; John Burge, "Piano Quartet"; Jordan Pal, "The Afar"; Michael Oesterle, "Centennials"; Nicole Lizée, "Bookburners"
Dance Recording of the Year	R&B/Soul Recording of the Year
Keys N Krates, "Save Me" feat. Katy B; A-Trak, "We All Fall Down" feat. Jamie Lidell; Autoerotique & Max Styler, "Badman (Torro Torro Remix)"; Borgeous & Lights, "Zero Gravity"; Sleepy Tom & Diplo, "Be Right There"; "At All" by Kaytranada was originally nominated in this category, but later review discovered that it was originally released outside the eligibility period and it was replaced on the nominee list by "Zero Gravity".	The Weeknd, Beauty Behind the Madness; Alessia Cara, Four Pink Walls; August Rigo, The Fall Out; Dru, "Déjà Vu"; Patrick Lehman, Butchy's Son
Rap Recording of the Year	Reggae Recording of the Year
Drake, If You're Reading This It's Too Late; BADBADNOTGOOD & Ghostface Killah, Sour Soul; Kardinal Offishall, Kardi Gras, Vol. 1: The Clash; k-os, Can't Fly Without Gravity; SonReal, For the Town	Kafinal, "Nah Complain" feat. Daddy U Roy; Dubmatix, The French Sessions; Exco Levi, "Hello Mama"; Kreesha Turner, "Sexy Gal" feat. T.O.K.; Lyndon John X, Escape from the Mongoose Gang

=== Other ===
Recording Package of the Year	Video of the Year
Lost Voices - Esmerine Clyde Henry Productions (Chris Lavis and Maciek Szczerbowski) (Art Directors/Designers/Illustrators/Photographers), Constellation: Ian Ilavsky (Designer); Club Meds - Dan Mangan + Blacksmith Cam Dales (Art Director/Designer), Ben Clarkson (Art Director/Illustrator); Elements - Long Distance Runners Duncan Major (Art Director/Designer), Joel Upshall (Photographer); West Trainz - West Trainz Erik West Milette (Art Director); Les Grandes artères - Louis-Jean Cormier Sarah Marcotte-Boislard (Art Director)	"Hello" - Adele Xavier Dolan; "Virgins" - Death from Above 1979 Eva Michon; "Dark Days" - PUP Jeremy Schaulin-Rioux and Chandler Levack; "For the Town" - SonReal Peter Huang; "Avalanche" - Kalle Mattson Philip Sportel
