= Juno Awards of 2010 =

Canadian music awards ceremony

- Date: 17–18 April 2010
- Venue: Mile One Centre; George Street, St. John's, Newfoundland and Labrador

Television/radio coverage
- Network: CTV

The Juno Awards of 2010 honoured music industry achievements in Canada for the latter part of 2008 and for most of 2009. These ceremonies were in St. John's, Newfoundland and Labrador, Canada during the weekend ending 18 April 2010. Primary ceremonies were held at the Mile One Centre and at Prince Edward Plaza on George Street. This also marks the first time to not feature a host.

April Wine was inducted into the Canadian Music Hall of Fame, Bryan Adams received the Allan Waters Humanitarian Award for his part in numerous charitable concerts and campaigns during his career. Ross Reynolds, an original board member of the Canadian Academy of Recording Arts and Sciences and former head of Universal Music Canada received the Walt Grealis Special Achievement Award.

CARAS, the association responsible for the awards, awarded the 2010 ceremonies to the Newfoundland and Labrador capital based on a bid which included government support commitments totalling $1.5 million (CA$), half funded by the province, $250,000 from the St. John's municipal government and the remainder from the Atlantic Canada Opportunities Agency.

== Events ==
Preliminary award-related events, known as Juno Week, began on 12 April 2010 with a launch event at the Confederation Building. Activities during this time included concerts such as JunoFest and the Juno Cup charity hockey game.

On 17 April, the Juno Fan Fare event featured artist interviews, prizes and opportunities for the public to meet musicians. However, some artists such as Alexisonfire were unable to attend when fog conditions that weekend delayed air travel into St. John's. The fog delays also cancelled some concerts the previous evening, and disrupted rehearsals for the main Sunday broadcast.

Also on that Saturday, winners in 32 Juno categories were announced at a special gala dinner at the St. John's Convention Centre. On the following day, prior to the main awards broadcast, a Songwriters' Circle concert was hosted by Dallas Green then broadcast on CBC Radio 2.

=== Primary ceremony ===
The primary awards ceremony on 18 April 2010 was telecast by CTV from Mile One Centre and from an outdoor venue on George Street, featuring multiple hosts and presenters.

Classified began the proceedings with "Oh... Canada" from the George Street venue. Bryan Adams could not attend in person due to the air travel disruption from the Icelandic ash cloud incident; he therefore received his Allan Waters Humanitarian Award via satellite.

Other artists performing at the ceremonies broadcast were Justin Bieber, Billy Talent, Blue Rodeo, Michael Bublé, Drake, Great Lake Swimmers, K'naan with Young Artists for Haiti, Metric and Johnny Reid.

Award presenters and personalities included:

- Musicians Barenaked Ladies, Jully Black, Jarvis Church, Terri Clark, Alex Cuba, Amelia Curran, deadmau5, Lights, Damhnait Doyle, Danny Fernandes, Great Big Sea, Dallas Green, Hedley, Carly Rae Jepsen, Shiloh, Stereos, Kim Stockwood, The Trews, Nikki Yanofsky
- Barry Stock (Three Days Grace), hosted April Wine's induction to the Canadian Music Hall of Fame
- Alexandre Bilodeau and Jon Montgomery (2010 Winter Olympics gold medallists)
- Television personalities Luther Brown (judge, So You Think You Can Dance Canada), Leah Miller (eTalk), Seamus O'Regan (Canada AM)
- James Moore (Minister of Canadian Heritage and Official Languages)

The following seven categories were awarded during the main broadcast:

- Album of the Year
- Fan Choice Award
- Group of the Year
- New Artist of the Year
- Rap Recording of the Year
- Single of the Year
- Songwriter of the Year

Rebroadcasts of the Juno Awards telecast were scheduled for A, Bravo!, MuchMore, Star! in late April.

== Changes to nomination categories for 2010 ==
Changes were made to the following award categories for this year's nominations:

- Country Album of the Year – formerly known as Country Recording of the Year, this category is now limited to complete albums and single songs may no longer be nominated.
- Music DVD of the Year and Vocal Jazz Album of the Year – voting on these categories is now fully conducted by appointed juries, with the winners no longer voted by the overall CARAS membership.
- Pop Album of the Year and Rock Album of the Year – nominees for these categories are now determined according to an equal weighting of sales figures and jury vote. Winners are still voted on by the overall CARAS membership.
- CD/DVD Artwork of the Year: This category is now called Recording Package of the Year to indicate that other product formats such as vinyl LPs may be considered for nomination.

== Nominees and winners ==
Nominees in the following categories were announced on 3 March 2010. Michael Bublé received the most nominations of any artist this year, represented in six categories and winning four of those (Album of the Year, Fan Choice Award, Pop Album of the Year and Single of the Year). Billy Talent, Drake and Johnny Reid each received four nominations. Drake, who had yet to release a full album, won in two categories (New Artist of the Year and Rap Recording of the Year). K'Naan also won two of his nominations (Artist of the Year and Songwriter of the Year).

Winners of most categories were announced on 17 April at a gala dinner.

=== Artist of the Year ===
Winner: K'Naan

Other Nominees:

- Jann Arden
- Michael Bublé
- Diana Krall
- Johnny Reid

=== Group of the Year ===
Winner: Metric

Other nominees:

- Billy Talent
- Blue Rodeo
- Hedley
- The Tragically Hip

=== New Artist of the Year ===
Winner: Drake

Other nominees:

- Justin Bieber
- Danny Fernandes
- Carly Rae Jepsen
- Shiloh

=== New Group of the Year ===
Winner: Arkells

Other Nominees:

- Down With Webster
- The New Cities
- Stereos
- Ten Second Epic

=== Jack Richardson Producer of the Year ===
Winner: Bob Rock, "Haven't Met You Yet" and "Baby (You've Got What It Takes)" (Michael Bublé, Crazy Love)

Other Nominees:

- Kevin Churko, "Look Where You're Walking" (Modern Science Mimortl, Modern Science, produced with Kane Churko); "The Dream" (In This Moment, The Dream)
- David Foster, "Cry Me A River" and "All of Me" (Michael Bublé, Crazy Love)
- Fred St-Gelais, "Plaisirs amers" and "C'est moi" (Marie-Mai, Version 3.0)
- Michael Phillip Wojewoda "Palm Trees" and "The Key (Different Than I Used To Be)" (Jennifer LFO, Songs from the Alien Beacon, produced with Jennifer Foster)

=== Recording Engineer of the Year ===
Winner: Dan Brodbeck, "Apple of My Eye" and "Be Careful" (Dolores O'Riordan, No Baggage)

Other Nominees:

- John Bailey, "I Can't Make You Love Me" (Sophie Milman, Take Love Easy); "Havana City" (Hilario Durán, Motion)
- Jon Drew, "Oh! The Boss Is Coming!" and "Pullin' Punches" (Arkells, Jackson Square)
- Darryl Neudorf, "And When You Wake Up" (Blue Rodeo, The Things We Left Behind); "Fever" (Neko Case, Middle Cyclone)
- Denis Tougas, "Save Your Love" and "The Mad Mile" (Kirsten Jones, The Mad Mile)

=== Songwriter of the Year ===
Winner: K'naan – "Wavin' Flag" (written with B. Mars, P. Lawrence and J. Daval), "Take A Minute", "If Rap Gets Jealous" (written with Gerald Eaton and Brian West) (K'naan, Troubadour)

Other nominees:

- Michael Bublé – "Haven't Met You Yet", "Hold On" (written with Alan Chang and Amy S. Foster) (Michael Bublé, Crazy Love)
- Emily Haines and James Shaw – "Gimme Sympathy", "Sick Muse", "Help I'm Alive" (Metric, Fantasies)
- Carly Rae Jepsen and Ryan Stewart – "Tug of War", "Bucket", "Money and the Ego" (Carly Rae Jepsen, Tug of War)
- Joel Plaskett – "Through & Through & Through", "Deny, Deny, Deny", "All The Way Down The Line" (Joel Plaskett, Three)

=== Fan Choice Award ===
Winner: Michael Bublé

Other nominees:

- Maxime Landry
- Nickelback
- Johnny Reid
- Ginette Reno

=== Nominated albums ===
==== Album of the Year ====
Winner: Crazy Love – Michael Bublé

Other nominees:

- Billy Talent III – Billy Talent
- Quiet Nights – Diana Krall
- Dance with Me – Johnny Reid
- My World – Justin Bieber

==== Aboriginal Recording of the Year ====
Winner: We Are... – Digging Roots

Other Nominees:

- Distant Morning Star – Digawolf
- Sing Soul Girl – Inez Jasper
- Swagger – Lucie Idlout
- Trail of Tears – Wayne Lavallee

==== Adult Alternative Album of the Year ====
Winner: Three – Joel Plaskett

Other Nominees:

- How to Fall Down in Public – Howie Beck
- Masters of the Burial – Amy Millan
- Nineteen Seventy-Seven – 1977
- Way Down Here – Cuff the Duke

==== Alternative Album of the Year ====
Winner: Fantasies – Metric

Other Nominees:

- Face Control – Handsome Furs
- I Can Wonder What You Did with Your Day – Julie Doiron
- Post-Nothing – Japandroids
- Sainthood – Tegan & Sara

==== Blues Album of the Year ====
Winner: The Corktown Sessions – Jack de Keyzer

Other Nominees:

- From the Water – Colin Linden
- I Need a Hat – Downchild
- Low Fidelity – Treasa Levasseur
- Steady Movin' – Carlos del Junco

==== Recording Package of the Year ====
Winner: Martin Bernard, Stéphane Cocke, Thomas Csano: Beats on Canvas, Beats on Canvas

Other Nominees:

- Thomas Csano, Alex McLean: Wooden Arms, Patrick Watson
- Rachelle Dupere, Derek Henderson, Evan Kaminsky: Masters of the Burial, Amy Millan
- Alex Durlak: Potential Things, Canaille
- Justin Ellsworth, Vanessa Heins, Daniel Romano, Ken Reaume: Bring Me Your Love (special edition), City and Colour

==== Children's Album of the Year ====
Winner: Love My New Shirt – Norman Foote

Other Nominees:

- Action Packed – Bobs and Lolo
- I'm Me! – Charlie Hope
- Walk On – The Kerplunks
- We Share The Earth – The Bee's Knees

==== Contemporary Christian/Gospel Album of the Year ====
Winner: Where's Our Revolution – Matt Brouwer

Other Nominees:

- Dear Diary – FM Static
- Devotion – Steve Bell
- Welcome to the Masquerade – Thousand Foot Krutch
- What I Gotta Say – Janelle

==== Classical Album of the Year (large ensemble) ====
Winner: Mathieu, Shostakovich, Mendelssohn: Concertino & Concertos – Alain Lefèvre & London Mozart Players

Other Nominees:

- Bartók – Les Violons du Roy
- Bruckner 8 – Yannick Nézet-Séguin & Orchestre Métropolitain
- Mendelssohn – Piano Concertos 1 & 2 – Symphony No. 5 – Louis Lortie and Orchestre symphonique de Québec
- Selections From the 2009 National Tour – National Youth Orchestra of Canada

==== Classical Album of the Year (solo or chamber ensemble) ====
Winner: Joel Quarrington: Garden Scene – Joel Quarrington

Other Nominees:

- El Dorado – Caroline Leonardelli
- James Ehnes plays Paganini 24 Caprices – James Ehnes
- Philip Glass : Portrait – Angèle Dubeau & La Pietà
- Tchaikovsky: Souvenir de Florence, Quartet No. 1 – I Musici de Montréal

==== Classical Album of the Year (vocal or choral performance) ====
Winner: Adrianne Pieczonka sings Puccini – Adrianne Pieczonka

Other Nominees:

- Gomidas Songs – Isabel Bayrakdarian
- Melodiya: Glinka, Mussorgsky, Rachmaninov, Tchaikovsky – Orchestre Radio-Canada Musique
- Porpora Arias – Karina Gauvin
- Songs By Ravel – Gerald Finley

==== Francophone Album of the Year ====
Winner: Les sentinelles dorment – Andrea Lindsay

Other Nominees:

- Dans mon corps – Les Trois Accords
- Mille excuses milady – Jean Leloup
- Un serpent sous ses fleurs – Yann Perreau
- Un toi dans ma tête – Luc de Larochellière

==== Instrumental Album of the Year ====
Winner: As Seen Through Windows – Bell Orchestre

Other Nominees:

- Beats on Canvas – Beats on Canvas
- L'île de Sept Villes – The Hylozoists
- Trifecta – Pavlo, Rik Emmett and Oscar Lopez
- Yalla Yalla! – Sultans of String

==== International Album of the Year ====
Winner: Only by the Night – Kings of Leon

Other Nominees:

- Circus – Britney Spears
- The E.N.D – The Black Eyed Peas
- Fearless – Taylor Swift
- I Dreamed a Dream – Susan Boyle

==== Contemporary Jazz Album of the Year ====
Winner: The Happiness Project – Charles Spearin

Other Nominees:

- Infernal Machines – Darcy James Argue's Secret Society
- Motion – Hilario Durán
- Silverbirch – John Roney with the Silver Birch String Quartet
- Songbook Vol. 1 – Kirk MacDonald Quartet

==== Traditional Jazz Album of the Year ====
Winner: It's About Time – Terry Clarke

Other Nominees:

- Bluesy Lunedi – Alain Bédard
- Pleased To Meet You – Oliver Jones and Hank Jones
- Regeneration – Al Henderson Septet
- Strands II – Darren Sigesmund

==== Vocal Jazz Album of the Year ====
Winner: Ranee Lee Lives Upstairs – Ranee Lee

Other Nominees:

- Haven't We Met? – Emilie-Claire Barlow
- I Like Men – Carol Welsman
- Lovelight – Michael Kaeshammer
- Quiet Nights – Diana Krall

==== Pop Album of the Year ====
Winner: Crazy Love – Michael Bublé

Other Nominees:

- The Listening – LIGHTS
- My World – Justin Bieber
- The Show Must Go – Hedley
- Stereos – Stereos

==== Rock Album of the Year ====
Winner: Billy Talent III – Billy Talent

Other Nominees:

- Dark Horse – Nickelback
- Life Starts Now – Three Days Grace
- Old Crows/Young Cardinals – Alexisonfire
- We Are The Same – The Tragically Hip

==== Roots and Traditional Album of the Year (Solo) ====
Winner: Hunter, Hunter, Amelia Curran

Other Nominees:

- Achin in Yer Bones, Romi Mayes
- Losin' Lately Gambler, Corb Lund
- Pink Strat, Bahamas
- Queen's Hotel, John Wort Hannam

==== Roots and Traditional Album of the Year (Group) ====
Winner: The Good Lovelies, The Good Lovelies

Other Nominees:

- Annie Lou, Annie Lou
- Let's Just Stay Here, Carolyn Mark and NQ Arbuckle
- Lost Channels, Great Lake Swimmers
- No Fool for Trying, Madison Violet

==== World Music Album of the Year ====
Winner: Comfortably Mine, Dominic Mancuso

Other Nominees:

- Alex Cuba, Alex Cuba
- La danse de l'exilé, Karim Saada
- Slide to Freedom 2: Make a Better World, Doug Cox Salil Bhatt
- Sunplace, Jaffa Road

=== Nominated releases ===
==== Single of the Year ====
Winner: "Haven't Met You Yet" – Michael Bublé

Other Nominees:

- "Anybody Listening" – Classified
- "Best I Ever Had" – Drake
- "Love Is a First" – The Tragically Hip
- "Rusted from the Rain" – Billy Talent

==== Classical Composition of the Year ====
Winner: "Lament in the Trampled Garden", Marjan Mozetich (album, Lament in the Trampled Garden)

Other Nominees:

- "Angels in Flight", Marjan Mozetich (album, Lament in the Trampled Garden)
- "Dreams of Flying", Rob Teehan (performed by National Youth Orchestra of Canada)
- "Earth Songs", Stephen Chatman (album, Earth Songs)
- "Nocturne", Leonard Enns (DaCapo Chamber Choir album, Shadowland)

==== Country Album of the Year ====
Winner: Dance With Me, Johnny Reid

Other Nominees:

- Believe, Emerson Drive
- Go, Doc Walker
- The Long Way Home, Terri Clark
- The Road Hammers II, The Road Hammers

==== Dance Recording of the Year ====
Winner: For Lack of a Better Name, Deadmau5

Other Nominees:

- I'm No Human, Misstress Barbara
- "Runnin", Doman and Gooding with Dru and Lincoln
- "Shine 4U", Carmen and Camille
- Thunderheist, Thunderheist

==== Music DVD of the Year ====
Winner: Iron Maiden: Flight 666 (Iron Maiden), Stefan Demetriou, Sam Dunn, Scott McFadyen, Rod Smallwood, Andy Taylor

Other Nominees:

- Acoustic – Friends & Total Strangers (The Trews), John-Angus MacDonald, Tim Martin, Larry Wanagas
- Drum! Live (Drum!), Daniel Brooker, Brookes Diamond, Doris Mason, Colin Smeltzer, Aaron Young
- Miroir Noir (Arcade Fire), Arcade Fire, Vincent Morisset
- Snakes & Arrows Live (Rush), Pegi Cecconi, Ray Danniels, François Lamoureaux, Pierre Lamoureaux, Allan Weinrib

==== R&B/Soul Recording of the Year ====
Winner: "Lonesome Highway", Jacksoul

Other Nominees:

- The Black Book, Jully Black
- The Bridge, Melanie Fiona
- Intro, Danny Fernandes
- The Long Way Home, Jarvis Church

==== Rap Recording of the Year ====
Winner: So Far Gone, Drake

Other nominees:

- Self Explanatory, Classified
- "I'm Still Fly", Big Page, Drake & U.G.O Crew
- Troubadour, K'naan
- Yes!, k-os

==== Reggae Recording of the Year ====
Winner: Gonna Be Alright, Dubmatix with Prince Blanco

Other Nominees:

- American Dream, Carl Henry
- Breaking Up, Tanya Mullings
- Show Me The Way, Kim Davis
- Wha-La-La-Leng, Ghislain Poirier with Face-T

=== Video of the Year ===
Winner: "Little Bit of Red" – Serena Ryder

Other Nominees:

- "Anybody Listening" – Classified
- "Heavens to Purgatory" – The Most Serene Republic
- "It's Okay" – Land of Talk
- "Mr. Hurricane" – Beast

== Compilation album ==
A compilation album featuring selected Juno nominees was released on 30 March 2010 by Sony Music Entertainment Canada. Sales of the album support the CARAS music education charity MusiCounts. The artists and track listing is as follows:

1. "Haven't Met You Yet", Michael Bublé
2. "Wavin' Flag", K'naan
3. "Burn It to the Ground", Nickelback
4. "Break", Three Days Grace
5. "Rusted From The Rain", Billy Talent
6. "Oh, The Boss Is Coming!", Arkells
7. "Gimme Sympathy", Metric
8. "Dead End Countdown", The New Cities
9. "Cha-Ching", Hedley
10. "Anybody Listening", Classified
11. "One Time", Justin Bieber
12. "Rich Girl$", Down With Webster
13. "Best I Ever Had", Drake
14. "Summer Girl", Stereos
15. "Operator (A Girl Like Me)", Shiloh
16. "Love Is A First", The Tragically Hip
17. "A Million Miles Away", Jann Arden
18. "Arizona Dust", Blue Rodeo
19. "A Woman Like You", Johnny Reid
20. "Walk on By", Diana Krall

== See also ==
- Juno Awards of 2002, the first and previous Juno Awards to be hosted in St. John's
