= Juno Awards of 2019 =

Canadian music awards ceremony

- The 2019 Juno Awards Logo
- Date: 16–17 March 2019
- Venue: Budweiser Gardens, London, Ontario
- Hosted by: Sarah McLachlan

Television/radio coverage
- Network: CBC

The Juno Awards of 2019, honouring Canadian music achievements, were presented in London, Ontario during the weekend of 16–17 March 2019. The primary telecast ceremonies were held at Budweiser Gardens, preceded by numerous Juno Week events from 11 March. This was the first time the Juno Awards were hosted in London.

The award ceremony was hosted by Sarah McLachlan.

Shawn Mendes won five awards, the most at the ceremonies, including Artist of the Year, Album of the Year, and Single of the Year.

== Host city bids ==
The Canadian Academy of Recording Arts and Sciences (CARAS) announced on 29 January 2018 that London was selected to host the 2019 Juno Awards. London's bid was valued at $1.7 million, including city council's pledge of $500,000.

CARAS had approached Hamilton, Ontario to make a bid for the 2019 Junos, although that city had expected to bid for the following year's awards. Hamilton city council reserved $550,000 for its bid, valued at $1.5 million.

Saskatoon, which first hosted the Junos in 2007, attempted to host the 2019 awards but withdrew its bid due to a lack of available funding. That bid did not receive support from the province of Saskatchewan. However, the city made a successful bid to host the awards in 2020.

There was also media speculation that Quebec City attempted to bid for the 2019 awards.

== Events ==
The Juno Cup benefit hockey game was held at the Western Fair District Sports Centre on 15 March 2019. The Rockers won the game 7–5.

Alan Doyle of Great Big Sea hosted the Songwriters Circle event on 17 March.

Most categories were awarded at a gala at the London Convention Centre on 16 March, hosted by Ben Kowalewicz (Billy Talent) and Julie Nesrallah (CBC).

The main ceremonies featured Loud Luxury, a duo originally from London. Other performers for the broadcast ceremonies were bülow, Cœur de pirate, Corey Hart, Loud, Jeremy Dutcher with Blake Pouliot, and The Reklaws. The broadcast on CBC's television, radio and music services attracted average minute ratings of 1.2 million. Viewership was 270,000 through streaming and on-demand web access, 14% more than for the 2018 Juno Awards.

JunoFest performances took place in multiple venues across the city on 15 and 16 March. Scheduled performers included Tokyo Police Club, Exco Levi, Texas King, and Whitehorse.

== Performers ==
List of musical performances
Artist(s)	Song(s)
Main show
Loud Luxury brando Cheer Western; The Western Mustang Band	"Body"
The Reklaws	"Long Live the Night"
Bahamas	"Way with Words"
Tyler Shaw	"With You"
Sarah McLachlan	"Beautiful Girl" "In Your Shoes"
Shawn Mendes (pre-taped)	"In My Blood"
Jeremy Dutcher	"Sakomawit"
Cœur de pirate Loud	"Dans la nuit"
Arkells	"Hand Me Downs"
NAV	"Champion" "Wanted You"
Corey Hart	"Never Surrender" (2019 version) "Sunglasses at Night"

== Presenters ==
=== Main show ===
- Loud Luxury and brando — presented Sarah McLachlan
- Simu Liu (from Kim's Convenience) and Killy (Toronto rapper) — presented Group of the Year
- The Reklaws — presented Album of the Year
- Pablo Rodríguez (Minister of Canadian Heritage) and Elisapie Isaac — presented Breakthrough Artist of the Year
- Sarah McLachlan — presented the Canadian Music Hall of Fame Award to Corey Hart
- Sting and David Foster — presented R&B/Soul Recording of the Year
- Cœur de pirate and Loud — presented Country Album of the Year
- Amanda Parris and Jessie Reyez — presented Fan Choice Award

== Nominees and winners ==
Nominations were announced on 29 January 2019.

David Foster received the year's Humanitarian Award due to his support of numerous charities and for his own foundation that supports families of organ transplant recipients, and Corey Hart was inducted into the Canadian Music Hall of Fame.

Duff Roman, known for his radio career including CHUM-FM, received the Walt Grealis Special Achievement Award.

Shawn Mendes won the Album of the Year, Artist of the Year, Pop Album of the Year, Single of the Year and Songwriter of the Year categories. He was unable to personally receive the awards since he was touring in Europe, but he recorded his song "In My Blood" on 4 March in Amsterdam for the Juno broadcast.

=== People ===
Artist of the Year	Group of the Year
Shawn Mendes; Michael Bublé; Alessia Cara; The Weeknd; Tory Lanez	Arkells; Chromeo; Metric; The Sheepdogs; Three Days Grace
Breakthrough Artist of the Year	Breakthrough Group of the Year
bülow; Grandson; Killy; Johnny Orlando; Meghan Patrick	The Washboard Union; 88Glam; Dizzy; Elijah Woods x Jamie Fine; Loud Luxury
Fan Choice Award	Songwriter of the Year
Avril Lavigne; bülow; Alessia Cara; Elijah Woods x Jamie Fine; Killy; Loud Luxury; Shawn Mendes; NAV; Tory Lanez; The Weeknd	Shawn Mendes, "Lost in Japan", "Youth", "In My Blood"; Frank Dukes, "Be Careful", "Better Now", "Call Out My Name"; Afie Jurvanen, "No Wrong", "Way With Words", "Any Place"; Jessie Reyez, "Promises", "One Kiss", "Apple Juice"; Donovan Woods, "Our Friend Bobby", "Truck Full of Money", "Next Year"
Producer of the Year	Recording Engineer of the Year
Eric Ratz, "People's Champ", "Relentless" (Arkells, Rally Cry); David Foster and Michael Bublé, "My Funny Valentine", "Where or When" (Michael Bublé, Love); Greg Wells, "Waving Through a Window" (Dear Evan Hansen, Broadway Cast Recording), "This Is Me" (The Greatest Showman); Mike Wise, "Not a Love Song", "Two Punks in Love" (bülow, Damaged); Thomas D'Arcy, "I've Got a Hole Where My Heart Should Be" (The Sheepdogs, Changing Colours), "Love the Way You Are" (Yukon Blonde, Critical Hit)	Shawn Everett, "Slow Burn", "Space Cowboy" (Kacey Musgraves, Golden Hour); Ben Kaplan, "Get Up", "It's Alright" (Mother Mother, Dance and Cry); Jason Dufour, "Truck Full of Money" (Donovan Woods, Both Ways), "When My Body Breaks" (Kandle, Holy Smoke); Robbie Lackritz, "No Wrong", "Way With Words" (Bahamas, Earthtones); Steve Bays, "Flashes" (Dear Rouge, Phases), "UnAmerican" (Said the Whale, UnAmerican)

=== Albums ===
Album of the Year	Adult Alternative Album of the Year
Shawn Mendes, Shawn Mendes; Jann Arden, These Are the Days; Hubert Lenoir, Darlène; The Weeknd, My Dear Melancholy, Three Days Grace, Outsider	Bahamas, Earthtones; The Barr Brothers, Queens of the Breakers; Dan Mangan, More or Less; Rhye, Blood; Gabrielle Shonk, Gabrielle Shonk
Adult Contemporary Album of the Year	Alternative Album of the Year
Michael Bublé, Love; Jann Arden, These Are the Days; Nuela Charles, Distant Danger; Molly Johnson, Meaning to Tell Ya; Whitehorse, A Whitehorse Winter Classic	Dizzy, Baby Teeth; Destroyer, Ken; Fucked Up, Dose Your Dreams; Tokyo Police Club, TPC; U.S. Girls, In a Poem Unlimited
Blues Album of the Year	Children's Album of the Year
Colin James, Miles to Go; Jack de Keyzer, Checkmate; Sue Foley, The Ice Queen; Myles Goodwyn, Myles Goodwyn and Friends of the Blues; Samantha Martin & Delta Sugar, Run to Me	Splash'N Boots, You, Me and the Sea; Beppie, Let's Go Bananas; Ginalina, It Takes a Village; Raffi, Dog on the Floor; Sonshine and Broccoli, It's Cool to be Kind
Classical Album of the Year – Solo or Chamber Ensemble	Classical Album of the Year – Large Ensemble or Soloist(s) with Large Ensemble Accompaniment
Gryphon Trio, The End of Flowers: Works by Clarke & Ravel; Andrew Wan and Charles Richard-Hamelin, Beethoven: Violin Sonatas Nos. 6, 7 & 8; Angela Hewitt, Scarlatti: Sonatas Vol. 2; Blake Pouliot with Hsin-I Huang, Ravel & Debussy: Sonates; Marc-André Hamelin, Schubert: Piano Sonata in B Flat Major D.960; Four Impromptus D.935	Toronto Symphony Orchestra conducted by Peter Oundjian feat. Louis Lortie, Sarah Jeffrey, Teng Li, and the Elmer Iseler Singers, Vaughan Williams; National Arts Centre Orchestra conducted by Alexander Shelley, New Worlds/Nouveaux Mondes; James Ehnes with Seattle Symphony and Detroit Symphony Orchestra, Newton Howard & Kernis: Violin Concertos; Tovey: Stream of Limelight; Louis Lortie with BBC Philharmonic, Saint-Saëns: Piano Concertos Nos. 1, 2 and 4; Thunder Bay Symphony Orchestra conducted by Arthur Post with Gryphon Trio, Into the Wonder
Classical Album of the Year – Vocal or Choral Performance	Contemporary Christian/Gospel Album of the Year
Barbara Hannigan with Reinbert de Leeuw, Vienna: Fin de siècle; Montreal Symphony Orchestra and Choir, conducted by Kent Nagano with guest soloists, Bernstein: A Quiet Place; Elmer Iseler Singers feat. Patricia O'Callaghan, David Braid: Corona Divinae Misericordiae; Joyce El-Khoury, Écho; Miriam Khalil, Ayre: Live	LoveCollide, Tired of Basic; Brian Doerksen, Grateful; Manic Drive, Into the Wild; Tim Neufeld and the Glory Boys, The Buffalo Road Show; Warren Dean Flandez, Speak
Country Album of the Year	Electronic Album of the Year
Brett Kissel, We Were That Song; Tim Hicks, New Tattoo; Jess Moskaluke, A Small Town Christmas; Meghan Patrick, Country Music Made Me Do It; The Reklaws, Feels Like That	Milk & Bone, Deception Bay; Felix Cartal, Next Season; Ekali, Crystal Eyes; Iamhill, Give it a Rest; Rezz, Certain Kind of Magic
Francophone Album of the Year	Indigenous Music Album of the Year
Loud, Une année record; Philippe Brach, Le silence des troupeaux; Cœur de pirate, En cas de tempête, ce jardin sera fermé; Hubert Lenoir, Darlène; Tire le coyote, Désherbage	Jeremy Dutcher, Wolastoqiyik Lintuwakonawa; Elisapie, The Ballad of the Runaway Girl; Northern Cree, Nitisanak - Brother and Sister; Snotty Nose Rez Kids, The Average Savage; Leonard Sumner, Standing in the Light
Instrumental Album of the Year	International Album of the Year
Gordon Grdina, China Cloud; Aerialists, Group Manoeuvre; Kevin Breit, Johnny Goldtooth and the Chevy Casanovas; The Fretless, Live from the Art Farm; Toninato/Thiessen, The Space Between Us	Post Malone, Beerbongs & Bentleys; Camila Cabello, Camila; Cardi B, Invasion of Privacy; Maroon 5, Red Pill Blues; Travis Scott, Astroworld
Jazz Album of the Year – Solo	Jazz Album of the Year – Group
Robi Botos, Old Soul; Alexis Baro, Sandstorm; Larnell Lewis, In the Moment; Renee Rosnes, Beloved of the Sky; Alison Young, So Here We Are	Andy Milne and Dapp Theory, The Seasons of Being; Allison Au Quartet, Wander Wonder; Andrew Rathbun Large Ensemble, Atwood Suites; Liebman/Murley Quartet, Live at U of T; Quinsin Nachoff's Flux, Path of Totality
Vocal Jazz Album of the Year	Metal/Hard Music Album of the Year
Laila Biali, Laila Biali; Holly Cole, Holly; Diana Krall and Tony Bennett, Love Is Here to Stay; Diana Panton, Solstice/Equinox; Jodi Proznick and Laila Biali, Sun Songs	Voivod, The Wake; Beyond Creation, Algorythm; Cancer Bats, The Spark That Moves; KEN mode, Loved; Kobra and the Lotus, Prevail II
Pop Album of the Year	Rock Album of the Year
Shawn Mendes, Shawn Mendes; bülow, Damaged; Chromeo, Head Over Heels; Hubert Lenoir, Darlène; Tyler Shaw, Intuition	Arkells, Rally Cry; Monster Truck, True Rockers; The Sheepdogs, Changing Colours; The Trews, Civilianaires; Three Days Grace, Outsider
Contemporary Roots Album of the Year	Traditional Roots Album of the Year
Donovan Woods, Both Ways; AHI, In Our Time; The Deep Dark Woods, Yarrow; Kaia Kater, Grenades; Megan Nash, Seeker	Pharis and Jason Romero, Sweet Old Religion; David Francey, The Broken Heart of Everything; The Slocan Ramblers, Queen City Jubilee; Vishtèn, Horizons; The Wailin' Jennys, Fifteen
World Music Album of the Year	Comedy Album of the Year
Wesli, Rapadou Kreyol; Ayrad, Zoubida; Boogat, San Cristóbal Baile Inn; Emmanuel Jal and Nyaruach, Naath; Telmary y Habana Sana, Fuerza Arara	Dave Merheje, Good Friend Bad Grammar; Debra DiGiovanni, Lady Jazz; Mayce Galoni, Awkwarder; Chanty Marostica, The Chanty Show; Pat Thornton, Chicken!

=== Songs and recordings ===
Single of the Year	Classical Composition of the Year
Shawn Mendes, "In My Blood"; bülow, "Not a Love Song"; Alessia Cara, "Growing Pains"; Loud Luxury, "Body"; The Weeknd feat. Kendrick Lamar, "Pray for Me"	Ana Sokolović, Golden Slumbers Kiss Your Eyes; Bekah Simms, Granitic; Cassandra Miller, About Bach; Nicole Lizée, Katana of Choice; Vincent Ho, Arctic Symphony
Dance Recording of the Year	R&B/Soul Recording of the Year
Loud Luxury, "Body"; Azari, "Gotasoul"; Dzeko and Tiësto, "Jackie Chan" feat. Preme and Post Malone; Jacques Greene, "Avatar Beach"; Keys N Krates, "Cura"	Jessie Reyez, Being Human in Public; Anders, Twos; Black Atlass, Pain & Pleasure; Charlotte Day Wilson, Stone Woman; The Weeknd, My Dear Melancholy,
Rap Recording of the Year	Reggae Recording of the Year
Tory Lanez, Love Me Now?; 88Glam, 88Glam Reloaded; Belly, Immigrant; Killy, Surrender Your Soul; NAV, Reckless	Dubmatix, Sly & Robbie meet Dubmatix — Overdubbed; Blessed, Money Don't Grow Pon Trees; Chelsea Stewart, Genesis; Exco Levi, Narrative; Kafinal feat. Queen Ifrica, Talk or No Talk

=== Other ===
Album Artwork of the Year	Video of the Year
Mike Milosh (art director, designer, illustrator and photographer) — Rhye, Blood; Gareth Auden-Hole (art director) and Emil Mateja (illustrator) — Jack Pine and the Fire, Left to Our Own Devices; Geordan Moore (art director, designer and illustrator) — Joshua Van Tassel, Crossworlds; Michael DeAngelis (art director and designer), Matt Barnes (photographer) and Jess Baumung (photographers) — Arkells, Rally Cry; Simon Dupuis (art director, designer, illustrator and photographer) — Les Hôtesses d'Hilaire, Viens avec moi	Ali Eisner, "No Depression" (Bahamas); Andrew De Zen, "Places" (Alaskan Tapes); Andy Hines, "Powerless" (Classified); Ben Knechtel, "Hang Ups" (Scott Helman); Peter Huang, "Have a Nice Day" (SonReal)
