= Charlie Hope =

Canadian musician

Charlie Hope is a Canadian children's singer and songwriter. Her debut album I'm Me! A Collection of Songs for Children, won two Independent Music Awards in 2010 for Best Album and Best Song for the title track, in the Children's Music category. This album was nominated for a Juno Award for Children's Album of the Year, that same year.

Her second album World of Dreams was recognized with a Creative Child "Seal of Excellence" and a Parents' Choice Silver Award.

Charlie Hope followed these two albums with Songs, Stories and Friends: Let's Go Play!, which won a Juno Award in 2012 for Children's Album of the Year. Songs, Stories and Friends: Let's Go Play! also won the Independent Music Award for Best Children's Album. The song "Best Friends" received an Independent Music Awards nomination.

Charlie Hope is from Toronto, and was raised in Ashland, Massachusetts from the age of 11. She resides in Seattle.
