= Walt Disney Records =

American record label of the Disney Music Group

- Parent company: Disney Music Group
- Founded: February 4, 1956; 70 years ago (as Disneyland Records)
- Founder: Walt and Roy O. Disney; Jimmy Johnson
- Status: Active
- Distributors: Universal Music Group; ONErpm; BMG Australia/Sony Music Entertainment Australia (1990–1997; Australia only); Warner Music Group (1990–2005; global albums); EMI (1988–1990, 2005–2012)
- Genre: Various, predominantly Pop and Soundtrack
- Country of origin: United States
- Location: Walt Disney Studios, Burbank, California
- Official website: music.disney.com

Walt Disney Records is an American record label owned by the Disney Music Group. The label releases soundtrack albums from the Walt Disney Company's motion picture studios, television shows, theme parks and traditional studio albums produced by its roster of pop, teen pop and country artists.

The music label was founded in the Spring of 1956 as Disneyland Records. Before that time, Disney recordings were licensed to a variety of other labels such as RCA, Decca, Capitol, ABC-Paramount, and United Artists. It was Disney Legend Jimmy Johnson who convinced Walt Disney’s brother Roy O. Disney that Disney, at time known as Walt Disney Productions should form their own record label. It adopted its current name in 1988 and is currently distributed worldwide by Universal Music Group.

== History ==
Disneyland Records was predicated by non-soundtrack audio material based on Davy Crockett miniseries from the Disneyland anthology television series, along with the song, "The Ballad of Davy Crockett," both featuring series star Fess Parker. These were licensed to Columbia Records, but the smaller Cadence Records label released the more successful "Ballad of Davy Crockett" sung by Bill Hayes faster, and this was the record that topped the charts instead. The following year, Disney saw profits for Mickey Mouse Club records in the millions being shared with Golden Records and ABC Records, finally convincing Roy to allow Johnson to start the in-house Disneyland Records.

=== Disneyland Records ===
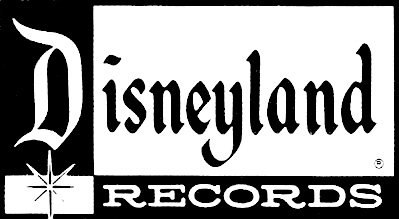
Disneyland Records logo

The label was founded as Disneyland Records on February 4, 1956, with Jimmy Johnson as president, serving as the record unit of Walt Disney Productions. Johnson brought in musician Tutti Camarata to head the Artists and Repertoire department of this new enterprise. One ten-inch LP under the "Disneyland" imprint had been released a few months earlier, a musical version of A Child's Garden of Verses, but it was distributed by the Charles Hansen music publishing company. The first album to be officially released directly by the label was Walt Disney Takes You to Disneyland, the only album Walt had ever recorded especially for his own record label. Also in the first year, seven Disney animated movie soundtracks were issued by the label.

Disneyland Records issued Parker's "Wringle Wrangle" single from the Westward Ho the Wagons! film within a year of starting operations; the single became a hit. This led the company to start recording music from outside the films. However, what ever was released by the company the industry categorized as children. Pricing was directed towards an adult audience, which was more than standard children fare. The only outside success was Camarata’s album "Tutti's Trumpets". Thus in 1959, the Disneyland label became the soundtrack and children's label and Buena Vista label for the occasional pop song record.

Camarata established the label's initial forays into long-form musical albums, which included jazz interpretations of Disney standards from Snow White and the Seven Dwarfs, Bambi, and Cinderella, as well as original musical concept albums, and he expanded the format of soundtracks by including selections from the score as well as the songs. Tutti's connections within the music industry also brought to the label the likes of Mary Martin, Louis Armstrong, Louis Prima and Phil Harris. After popular Mouseketeer, Annette Funicello, sang a song called "How Will I Know My Love" on the Mickey Mouse Club TV series, fans contacted the studio for the record, which became a minor hit. This prompted Camarata, Johnson and Walt Disney to encourage Annette's career as the label's first artist in residence. In 1959, the Buena Vista Records label was formed for Funicello's select recordings, soundtrack albums and other contemporary audiophile music.

While looking for the right material for Annette, Tutti and his team discovered the songwriting duo of Richard M. Sherman and Robert B. Sherman after hearing one of their songs on the radio. The two were brought to the Disney studio in Burbank where they eventually became the first staff songwriters for the company.With the participation of the Sherman brothers and two technicians at Sunset Sound in Hollywood, Camarata developed his renowned "Annette Sound," a specific type of double/reverb recording to strengthen Annette's voice that became an industry standard. The Shermans penned not only a good deal of Annette's songs, but were also responsible for most of the iconic Disney songs of the 1960s and beyond – “It's a Small World” and “The Tiki Tiki Tiki Room” for the theme parks, as well as the songs from Mary Poppins, Winnie the Pooh and the Honey Tree, The Jungle Book, Winnie the Pooh and the Blustery Day and Bedknobs and Broomsticks.

In 1960, Camarata left the staff but under Roy O. Disney's suggestion, established his own full-service recording studio where most of Disney and Buena Vista's records were recorded, mixed, engineered, cut and mastered, the Los Angeles landmark, Sunset Sound. In effect he was associated with Disney until the early seventies. Disneyland Records started its read-along series in 1965 with singer/actor Robie Lester appearing on more titles than any other in the history of the label.

By 1971, Disneyland Records was legally known as Disneyland/Vista Records. Additionally, A Child's Garden of Verses was still in their lineup. Disneyland/Vista worked with Rankin/Bass to release six recordings tied to The Hobbit 1977 animated film. Rankin/Bass also had Disneyland/Vista release soundtracks for two of their earlier holiday specials, Frosty's Winter Wonderland and ’Twas the Night Before Christmas.

The company was so successful with its Mickey Mouse Disco album that Disneyland looked to expand again into pop music by October 1980. Its success also lead to the issuance of animated theatrical shorts based on songs from the album. Two such original productions were "That Waddlin' Crazy Guy" and "Pardners" featuring the comedy singing team of Willio and Phillio (Will Ryan and Phil Baron).

By 1985, while the label was now also known as Disneyland Records and Tapes, its legal name was slightly changed to Disneyland/Vista Records and Tapes.

Around 1987, the label began releasing their albums on CD. Some of the first albums that the label released on CD were The Disney Collection series.

=== Walt Disney Records ===
In 1988, Disneyland/Vista Records and Tapes was renamed Walt Disney Records (initially also known as Disney Records for three years).

Around 1990, Walt Disney Records signed several youth targeted acts like Parachute Express and Norman Foote. Disney let these acts go after several years as their mandate was changed to support the animated features, produce book and tape packages and compilations to take advantage of the catalog.

In May 2000, Walt Disney Records signed the label's first teen singer, Myra; her first single with the label, "Magic Carpet Ride", was released on May 23, 2000 as part of the La Vida Mickey album.

On June 24, 2014, Walt Disney Records launched a series entitled The Legacy Collection. The series includes original soundtracks, as well as unreleased music, and composer and producer liner notes. As of 2022, the collection includes 16 albums ranging between various anniversaries of various Disney films and Disneyland.

With Disney's purchase of Lucasfilm on December 21, 2012, Walt Disney Records became the official record label for the studio and all Star Wars-related soundtracks, beginning with The Force Awakens soundtrack on December 18, 2015. In January 2017, Disney acquired the distribution rights to the entire Star Wars music catalog from Sony Classical; the soundtrack albums from the first six films were then released by Walt Disney Records in digital formats the same day. Disney reissued the digitally remastered original Star Wars soundtrack albums in physical formats on May 4, 2018.

In 2024, Disney acquired the distribution rights to the first four Indiana Jones soundtrack albums from Concord Records; the soundtracks were then reissued by Walt Disney Records later that year. That same year, Walt Disney Records released A Whole New Sound, an album of pop-punk cover versions of classic songs from Disney films. The first single from the album, a cover of Elton John's "Can You Feel the Love Tonight" by Simple Plan, was released on July 12, 2024.

On May 13, 2025, for the 70th anniversary of Disneyland, Walt Disney Records released the seven-song compilation album Music From Disneyland Resort 70th Celebration. The album includes Jonas Brothers' “Celebrate Happy", the theme song for the 70th anniversary celebration, as well as new music from Boyz II Men, FITZ, and Scott Hoying.

== See also ==
- List of record labels
- Hollywood Records
- Fox Music
