= Heather Bishop =

Canadian folk singer-songwriter

- Born: April 25, 1949 (age 76); Regina, Saskatchewan
- Genres: Folk, children's
- Occupation: Singer-songwriter
- Years active: 1960s-present
- Labels: Mother of Pearl Records
- Website: www.heatherbishop.com

Heather Bishop, CM OM (born April 25, 1949) is a Canadian folk singer-songwriter primarily known for her work as a social justice advocate and in the field of folk music and children's music. For her dedication to social justice, she has been awarded the Order of Canada, the Order of Manitoba and an Honorary Doctorate of Laws among many other awards.

== Early life ==
Born in Regina, Saskatchewan on April 25, 1949, Bishop studied piano as a child, began playing the guitar in her teens, and later took voice lessons in Winnipeg with Alicja Seaborn. She earned a BA (Regina) in 1969. After performing in the early 1970s with the all-women dance band Walpurgis Night, first as a pianist and then as a singer, she began a solo career at the 1976 Regina Folk Festival.

== Career ==
A singer of considerable power and warmth, Bishop emerged in the 1980s as one of Canada's leading performers in both feminist and children's music. Bishop has been active in the folk community since the late 1960s. She has appeared at dozens of folk festivals including her inaugural appearance at the 1976 Winnipeg Folk Festival, London, Ontario's Home County Folk Festival, and has been a staple at numerous international children's festivals in both Canada and the United States. Heather was a regular guest performer on the internationally acclaimed Fred Penner Show.

In 1976 she founded Mother of Pearl Records. She recorded her first children's album, Belly Button: A Collection of Songs for Children in 1982, and has 15 albums to her credit, including Juno nominations for her 1987 A Taste of the Blues and her 1997 Chickee's on the Run. Bishop is also a prominent social activist, championing such causes as social justice, labour unions, environmentalism, LGBT rights, animal rights, and children's safety. She was made a member of the Order of Canada in 2005, the Order of Manitoba (2001), an Honorary Doctor of Laws degree from Brandon University (2011), and Her Majesty the Queen's Diamond Jubilee Medal (2012).

== Discography ==
- Grandmother's Song, 1979
- Celebration, 1980
- Belly Button: A Collection of Songs for Children, 1982
- I Love Women Who Laugh, 1982
- A Taste of the Blues, 1987
- Walk That Edge, 1989
- Old, New, Borrowed, Blue, 1992
- A Duck in New York City, 1994
- Purple People Eater, 1994
- Chickee's on the Run, 1997
- Daydream Me at Home, 1997
- Heather Bishop Live!, 2001
- A Tribute to Peggy Lee, 2004
- My Face is a Map of My Time Here, 2009
- The Montreal Sessions, 2016
