= Bob Schneider (children's music) =

Canadian singer-lyricist (born 1955)

Bob Schneider CM OBC
- Born: Robert Schneider; 12 April 1946 (age 79); Toronto, Ontario, Canada
- Genres: Children's music; Children's literature
- Occupations: Musician, author, essayist, lecturer
- Years active: 1980–present
- Labels: A&M; Rounder
- Website: boballyrecords.com

Bob Schneider is a Canadian singer-lyricist, best known for his children's music. He is best known as the lead singer of Bob Schneider and the Rainbow Kids' band which also included back up vocalist Katherine Flynn. Schenider was a nominee for the Juno Award for Children's Album of the Year in 1982 for Listen to the Children. The following year, he won the Juno Award for When You Dream a Dream.

== Discography ==
- Listen to the Children (1980)
- When You Dream a Dream (1982)
- Playing Baseball
- Just Friends
- In a Child's Heart
- Country Kiddie Boogie
- Hulk (2003)
- Spider-Man and Friends (2003–2004)
