= Jennifer Gasoi =

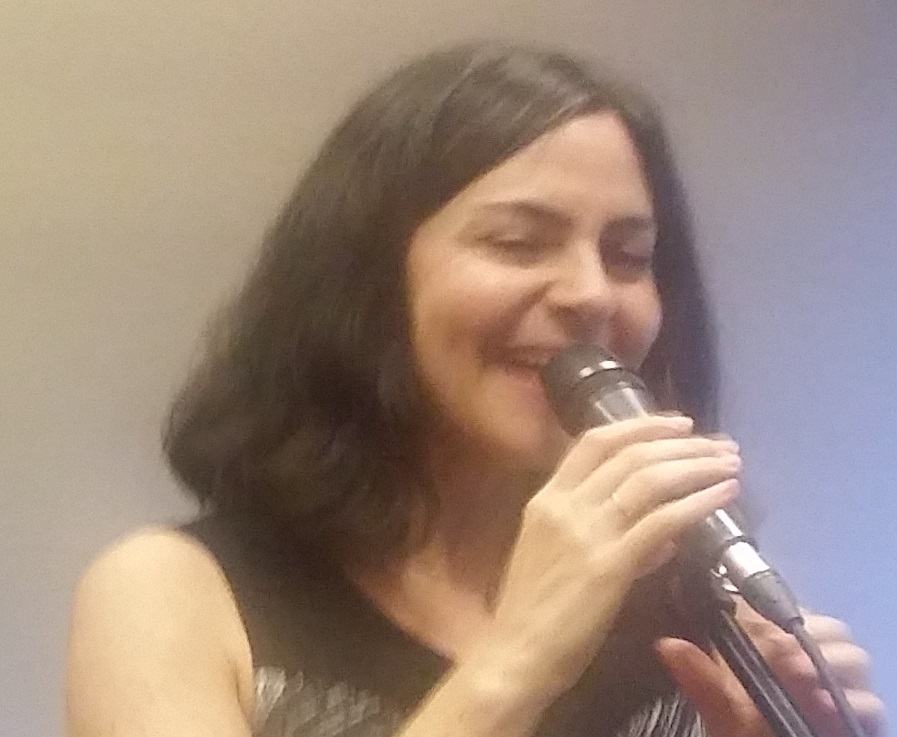

Background information
- Born: 1973 or 1974 (age 51–52); Vancouver, British Columbia
- Origin: Vancouver, British Columbia
- Genres: children's
- Website: www.jennifergasoi.com

Jennifer Gasoi (born c. 1974) is a Canadian children's musician, noted for her albums Songs For You and Throw a Penny in the Wishing Well.

== Early life ==
Born and raised in Vancouver, British Columbia, Gasoi graduated from McGill University with a Bachelor of Arts in Social Work in 1996. While at McGill, Gasoi joined a jazz choir led by Ranee Lee. After graduation, Gasoi further developed her jazz skills at Capilano University's jazz program.

== Career ==
During her post-graduate years in Vancouver, Gasoi sung in local jazz concerts with Linton Garner. She appeared at the Vancouver International Jazz Festival from 1999 to 2001. She moved to Montreal in 2002 and two years afterwards released her first children's album, Songs For You.

In late 2012, she released her second children's album, Throw a Penny in the Wishing Well. The album was nominated for the Children's Album of the Year at the 2013 Juno Awards. It was also nominated for the 56th Annual Grammy Awards in 2014, winning the award for Best Children's Album. Gasoi is the first Canadian to win a Grammy in that category.

== Discography ==
- Songs for You (2004)
- Throw a Penny in the Wishing Well (2012)

== Awards and recognition ==
- 2005: Juno Awards of 2005, nominee, Children's Album of the Year, Songs For You
- 2013: Juno Awards of 2013, nominee, Children's Album of the Year, Throw a Penny in the Wishing Well
- 2013: 9th Canadian Folk Music Awards, nominee, Children's Album of the Year
- 2014: Grammy Award for Best Children's Album, winner
