= The Kerplunks =

Canadian children's music group

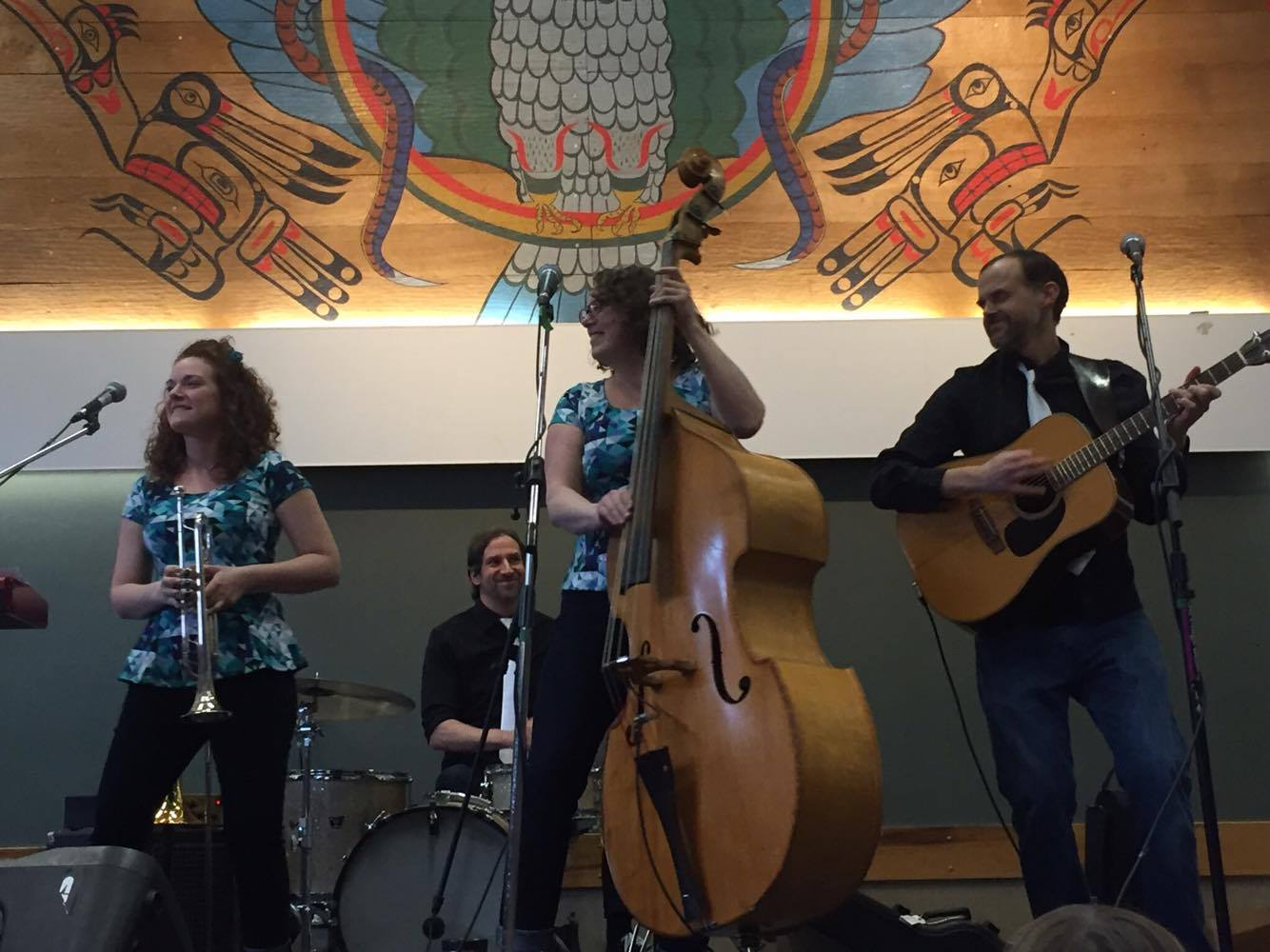
- Tofino Whalefest 2017: Dinah D (upright Bass), Phil Wipper (drums), Jocelyn Hallett (horns) Aaron Cadwaladr (guitar)

Background information
- Origin: Gabriola Island, British Columbia, Canada
- Genre: Children's Music
- Years active: 2007–present
- Label: Independent
- Members: Dinah D, Jocelyn Hallett, Aaron Cadwaladr, Phil Wipper
- Past members: Tina Jones
- Website: www.thekerplunks.com

The Kerplunks are a Canadian children's music group based on Gabriola Island, British Columbia. The group was formed in 2006, releasing their first self-titled album in 2007. The Kerplunks have been nominated for multiple Juno Awards and won multiple Parents Choice Awards etc. Due to public outcry for children's music that parents could enjoy, this 4-piece band can be found at top music festivals across Canada and Canada and beyond.

The Kerplunks are composed of musicians Dinah D, Jocelyn Hallett (2016), Phil Wipper, and Aaron Cadwaladr. Their first album, The Kerplunks was recorded in 2007 and was written and largely performed by Dinah D and Tina Jones (2006–2016), with the introduction of Phil Wipper on drums. This album saw the band receive several award nominations and wins in Canada, including the prestigious JUNO Award. The Kerplunks' second album, Walk On (2009), saw the introduction of Aaron Cadwaladr as guitarist, and garnered several more award nominations. Their third album, Number 3 (released in June 2010) followed suit with multiple awards internationally. In June 2012, The Kerplunks released their full-length DVD titled Get Creative, also to critical acclaim. The band's fourth studio album titled Pants & Mammals was released in June 2015. In 2016, Tina Jones left the project and Jocelyn Hallett (Jojo) was invited in. The band since released their first lullaby album, an hour long sleep epic titled Lullabies For Big Eyes.

The Kerplunks are a four-piece band who perform for children's audiences. Each show is an action-packed adventure between the band members and the audience, resulting in dancing, singing and hilarity. On album, they combine to play over 10 different instruments, from the kazoo to the upright bass. Live, The Kerplunks perform with Upright Bass (Dinah), Trumpet/Trombone/Keys (Jojo), Guitar (Aaron), and Drums (Phil or Brendan). Appearing at many large national festivals and small community gatherings, they play many musical styles including reggae, rock, swing, blues, bluegrass, and many others.

The Kerplunks were nominees for the 2009 Juno Award, 2010 Juno Award, and 2011 Juno Award in the category for Children's Album of the Year. The group were recipients of the 8th annual Vox Populi Independent Music Awards for Best Children's Album The Kerplunks and again in 2009 for best Children's song "Walk On". The Kerplunks' "Ants Dance" was also nominated for the 7th Annual Independent Music Awards for Children's Song of the year. In 2008, they won the Canadian Folk Music Award for Children's Album of the Year; Parent's Choice Approved Award, and the Western Canadian Music Award for Outstanding Children's Recording.

== Early history ==
=== Pre-The Kerplunks ===
All members of The Kerplunks began playing music in grade school. Each band member took formal music training and had many years of performances before the creation of The Kerplunks.

=== Formation and early success ===
Dinah D (Desrochers) and Tina Jones originally met in 2005 on Gabriola Island, British Columbia, Canada. Desrochers and Jones were soon teaching their successful musical preschool called Melody Makers on Gabriola Island. Two year later, D and Jones formed The Kerplunks after performing their co-penned original songs for a large audience of Gabriola Islanders as part of a production they were producing called D'Ants in Yer Pants, funded by the Canada Council for the Arts. This led to the first self-titled studio album by The Kerplunks.

== Musical career ==
=== The Kerplunks (2007) ===
This first self-titled album release was an overnight sensation, surprising The Kerplunks. The band had begun recording this 14 song hit album in 2006 and they had not planned to make a career of children's music but soon discovered that there was a need for catchy and groovy music with childlike themes. The Kerplunks gained wide spread reviews, enjoyed instant radio play with the CBC and other college radio stations, and quickly led to the making of the band's solidification and their second album. An online review of the band coined the phrase "Kid Content Grown Up Groove", which the band continues to use to this day to describe their sound. The Kerplunks gained recognition in Canada through the Juno Awards, Western Canadian Music Awards, the Canadian Folk Music Awards and many international awards such as the Independent Music Awards, the International Songwriting Competition, and the Parents Choice Awards. Most of the instruments on The Kerplunks were recorded by Dinah D (Bass/Banjo/Mandolin/Percussion/VocalsSFX), Tina Jones (Horns/Vocals/Percussion), and Phil Wipper (Drums) with the exception of guests Rick Salt (Guitar) and Chad Geekie (Piano and Fender Rhodes keyboard).

=== Walk On (2009) ===
This sophomore album built on the success of the first release two-fold. More themes that kids can connect to, more groovy music for adults to enjoy. This time around, The Kerplunks had adopted Aaron Cadwaladr into their band as a full-time guitarist, making the sound more jazzy and sophisticated. The album was adopted by the library systems across the United States and Canada and led to many sales for the band. This album was recognized by all the awards mentioned above under The Kerplunks (2007) and began the start of their household name in some families across Canada.

=== Number 3 (2010) ===
The Kerplunks build even higher with their third album. They bring in guest horn players (Pierre Komen, Nick LaRiviere, Matt Carter from Dinah D's Contraband Swingclub), guest guitarist David Gogo, and several other musical guests who filled the sound out and gave Number 3 a very full sound. Number 3, according to the band, is a studio album as many of the songs were too difficult to perform with The Kerplunks' usual 4 piece live line-up.

=== Get Creative DVD (2012) ===
This 10-song DVD features music videos for 10 of The Kerplunks' fan favorite songs. The tracks for this compilation DVD were selected by fan polling of their fans. Each video is preceded by a fun and informative clip which featured 10 soundtracks clips written by Dinah D and Tina Jones. The band is joined by many guest actors and child-actors in Get Creative.

=== Pants & Mammals (2015) ===
This album hearkens back to Walk On (the band's second release), with a callback to its hallmark characteristics of being fun, cathcy, playful. Many of the songs on Pants & Mammals are part of the band's regular playlist. This album garnered many music award nominations and wins in Canada and Internationally.

=== Lullabies For Big Eyes (2018) ===
This is the first release with new band member Jojo (Jocelyn Hallett) and the first Kerplunks album with Dinah D as sole music producer. Lullabies was written and recorded following a period of sleeplessness/insomnia by several band members and subsequently is highly researched as a sleep aide. Lullabies For Big Eyes is 65 minutes of music, a sleeping soundtrack.

== Discography ==
- The Kerplunks (2007)
- Walk On (2009)
- Number 3 (2010)
- Get Creative DVD (2012)
- Pants and Mammals (2015)
- Lullabies For Big Eyes (2018)

== See also ==
- Music of Canada
- List of bands from Canada
