= Beppie =

Canadian children's musician

Stephanie Nhan, known as Beppie is a Canadian children's musician, and educator from Edmonton, Alberta. She is most noted as a two-time Juno Award nominee for Children's Album of the Year, receiving nods at the Juno Awards of 2019 for Let's Go Bananas! and at the Juno Awards of 2023 for Nice to Meet You.

A music teacher at Edmonton's Resonate Music School & Studio, she released her debut album There's a Song Inside Me in 2017. Her style is marked by efforts to create music that is fun for children while remaining listenable and enjoyable to parents who are listening to it with them.

In addition to her Juno Award nominations, she is a two-time Western Canadian Music Award nominee for Children's Artist of the Year, receiving nods in 2020 and 2022.

== Discography ==
- There's a Song Inside Me - 2017
- Let's Go Bananas! - 2018
- Song Soup - 2019
- Dino-Mite! - 2021
- Nice to Meet You - 2022
