= Jack Grunsky =

Canadian singer and songwriter (born 1945)

- Born: July 1, 1945 (age 81); Graz, Austria
- Genres: Folk, jazz
- Occupation: Singer/songwriter
- Instrument: Vocals

Jack Grunsky (born July 1, 1945) is a Canadian singer and songwriter. Grunsky's musical career has spanned two continents. More than three decades of recording and touring have earned him a wide following from both adult and children's audiences.

== Folk music ==
Born in Austria, he moved to Canada as an infant. His singing and performing began in high school in Toronto, but after graduating he returned to Europe where his music career began. In 1966 he formed the successful but short-lived folk singing group, Jack's Angels who were signed to Amadeo Records of Vienna, Austria. After the group disbanded, Grunsky recorded three solo albums for the label, one of which was produced by Alexis Korner. The album, Toronto, was recorded in London and featured tracks with Mick Taylor on slide guitar.

He was subsequently brought on board the progressive German label, Kuckuck Records of Munich, where he produced three more albums of original material. Grunsky was a featured guest on many radio and TV specials and even hosted his own half-hour weekly radio show called, Folk With Jack on Austrian radio ORF.

In 1974 he moved with wife and young daughter back to Canada where he connected with record producer Chad Irschick and released an independent album titled, The Patience Of A Sailor.

== Children's music ==
In the early 1980s Grunsky developed a keen interest in music for children. Since then, he has been well known for his children's music. His eleven recordings for children have received prestigious awards in children's media including two Juno Awards for Best Children's Recording, several U.S. Parents' Choice Gold Awards, multiple placements on the American Library Association's "Notable Recording Lists" and a Parent's Guide to Children's Media Award.

He tours extensively, performing in theatres and family concert settings, international children's festivals, and Early Childhood Educational conferences. Numerous television appearances on Treehouse TV have broadened his appeal both in Canada and the United States. Grunsky has also performed his symphony show for young audiences called Welcome to the Orchestra with most major Canadian orchestras.

Other music production credits include Fred Penner's 2002 CD, Sing With Fred, which won Children's Album of the Year at the 2003 Juno Awards.

Jack Grunsky released his first NuJazz instrumental CD, Coastlines, in 2006. He released a follow-up album, Room To Move in May 2008. He continues to focus on both jazz and children's performances. His most recent children's album, Hoppin' Socks was released in 2011.

His daughter Cosima is a singer-songwriter who often performs music with her father. She has released three independent recordings to date.

== Awards and recognition ==
- 1992: nominee, Juno Award, Best Children's Album, Children of the Morning
- 1993: winner, Juno Award, Best Children's Album, Waves of Wonder
- 1994: nominee, Juno Award, Best Children's Album, Dream Catcher
- 1997: nominee, Juno Award, Best Children's Album, Jumpin' Jack
- 2001: winner, Juno Award, Best Children's Album, Sing & Dance
- 2004: nominee, Juno Award, Children's Album of the Year, Like a Flower to the Sun
