= Charlotte Diamond =

Canadian children's singer

- Born: July 31, 1945 (age 79); Richmond, British Columbia, Canada
- Genres: Children's music
- Occupation(s): Musician, Songwriter
- Instrument(s): Vocals, Guitar
- Years active: 1985–present
- Labels: Hug Bug Records
- Website: charlottediamond.com

Charlotte Diamond CM (born July 31, 1945), is a Canadian musician, best known for her children's music.

== Biography ==
Charlotte Diamond was born and raised in Vancouver, British Columbia. She graduated from North Delta Secondary School in 1963, and from the University of British Columbia with a Bachelor of Secondary Education in 1969, majoring in zoology and French language. Diamond took further studies in French language at Laval University, in Quebec City, Quebec. She taught science, French and music at New Westminster Secondary School for 10 years. Diamond spent most her life in Richmond, British Columbia, but now lives in Sechelt, on British Columbia's Sunshine Coast.

== Music career ==
Diamond has recorded 14 albums including the Juno Award-winning 10 Carrot Diamond, a double-platinum record. Some of her most popular songs include "Four Hugs a Day", "I Am a Pizza", "Octopus (Slippery Fish)", "Each of Us Is a Flower", and "May There Always Be Sunshine". Diamond is trilingual and has recorded songs in Spanish and French, including "Soy una pizza" and "Qu'il y ait toujours le soleil", and she also performs songs in American Sign Language. Her son, Matthew, is also a musician, joining Diamond for their 2015 album Diamonds by the Sea, as well as touring with her. Diamond has toured in North America, Central America, and Europe.

== Awards and recognition ==
On June 30, 2016, Diamond was made member of the Member of the Order of Canada by Governor General David Johnston for "her contributions as a children's entertainer who, through music, helps develop creativity and self-expression in youth."

- 1986 – winner, Juno Award, Best Children's Album, 10 Carrot Diamond
- 1987 – nominee, Juno Award, Best Children's Album, Diamond in the Rough
- 1989 – nominee, Juno Award, Best Children's Album, Diamonds and Dragons
- 1989 – nominee, Juno Award, Best Children's Album, Qu'il y ait toujours le soleil
- 2001 – nominee, Juno Award, Best Children's Album, Charlotte Diamond's World
- 2003 – nominee, Juno Award, Children's Album of the Year, Nous sommes tous comme les fleurs
- 2019 – Special Distinguished Service Award, British Columbia Music Educators' Association

== Discography ==
- 1985: 10 Carrot Diamond
- 1986: Diamond in the Rough
- 1988: Diamonds & Dragons
- 1988: Qu'il y ait toujours le soleil
- 1990: The Christmas Gift
- 1992: My Bear Gruff
- 1993: Bonjour l'hiver
- 1994: Soy una Pizza
- 1995: Sing-Along with Charlotte Diamond and Friends
- 1996: Diamonds & Daydreams
- 2000: Charlotte Diamond's World
- 2001: Nous sommes tous comme les fleurs
- 2006: Todo el Mundo Come Banana!
- 2011: 24 Carrot Diamond: The Best of Charlotte Diamond
- 2015: Diamonds by the Sea

== Personal life ==
Diamond met her husband Harry in 1971. Harry was a salmon fisherman before he joined Charlotte to work for their company, Hug Bug Music. Diamond has two sons and three grandsons.
