= Norman Foote =

Canadian musician

Norman Mervyn Barrington-Foote is a Canadian musician, songwriter, and comedian. Foote is originally from Vancouver, British Columbia, Canada. He has been nominated for four Juno Awards for Best Children's Album in 1990, 1993, 2001, and won in 2010. He has written for Walt Disney Records, Shari Lewis, CBC's syndicated TV show Scoop and Doozie, and Koba Entertainment, with productions including Nelvana's Little Bear Live, Max & Ruby live on stage shows, Toopy and Binoo in The Marshmallow Moon and The Backyardigans Live.

== History ==
Norman Foote received his first guitar from his parents at the age of 11. Influenced by the Beatles, Hank Williams, and Elvis, he soon switched to the electric guitar. This led to him performing with garage bands throughout his high school career. At the age of 20, Foote left home to travel to Australia and New Zealand and it was while he was abroad and performing with a travelling theatre group in New South Wales, Australia that Foote discovered his passion for puppetry and slapstick comedy.

Foote was one of the first artists to sign on for the Music Box Artist Series with Walt Disney Records. It was with Disney that he recorded his first two albums, Foote Prints and If the Shoe Fits. In 1995, Foote teamed up with another children's performer, Fred Penner, and his company Oak Street Music to release his next album Shake a Leg. Oak Street Music continued to be a major contributor in the production of future records, including Pictures on the Fridge, released in 1997.

Foote's music has been called exuberant, good-natured, and fun with refined mannerisms. While Foote uses only his voice and guitar as instruments, he combines light jazz, pop, and folk music to create his own style that has helped keep his name alive for over 20 years. His first contemporary album, Domestic Rendez-vous, is geared towards an adult audience rather than children.

He has performed with numerous symphonies, including the Oklahoma City Philharmonic, Nashville Symphony Orchestra, Vancouver Symphony Orchestra, and the London Symphony Orchestra. He has also performed at the Montreal Comedy Festival, Just For Laughs and internationally at the Galway Arts Festival in Ireland.

His seventh album, Love My New Shirt, won "Best Children's Album" at the 2010 JUNO Awards in St. Johns, Canada. On May 25, 2013, Norman released his eighth children's album, "Always Be Yourself". In 2018, Norman's 9th children's album, "Everybody Sings," was released.

== Awards ==
- Parent's Choice Award - 1992, 1996, 2001, 2002
- Socan's Best Songwriter for Children - 2002
- National Association of Parenting Publications of America Award - 1992, 2002, 2003
- Juno Awards Nominee - 1990, 1993, 2001
- "Juno Awards" Winner - 2010

== Discography ==
- Some People (1985)
- Foote Prints (1991)
- If the Shoe Fits (1992)
- Shake a Leg (1995)
- Pictures on the Fridge (1997)
- Step To It (1999)
- 1000 Pennies (2001)
- Love My New Shirt (2008)
- Always Be Yourself (2013)
- Everybody Sings (2018)
- Shoe-Fly (2025)
