= Judy & David =

- Origin: Toronto, Ontario, Canada
- Genres: Children's music, klezmer
- Years active: 1991–

Judy & David were a Canadian children's music duo formed in 1991 in Richmond Hill, Ontario. They are recipients of a 1998 Juno Award in the category of Juno Award for Children's Album of the Year.

== Biography ==
Judy and David are husband and wife and have been making music since 1991. The duo also appears as a television personality, and promotes a live concerts in the Greater Toronto Area. They launched their career in February 1993 with their first concert, the release of Jumpin' Up & Down and the multi-million selling My Little Yellow Bus collection. They are best known for their former television series, Judy & David's Boom Box on Treehouse TV in Canada and JiggiJump on Kids' CBC.

The band has also won the Parent's Choice Gold Award and Junos. They are now among the most prolific children's recording artists in North America.

The duo's members are David Gershon (born in Chicago, Illinois in 1964) and his wife Judy Adelman Gershon (born in Toronto, Ontario in 1965).

Judy Adelman Gershon is also the Artistic Director of the Toronto Jewish Chorus. David Gershon is also the chair of Education Arts Canada.

== Recordings ==
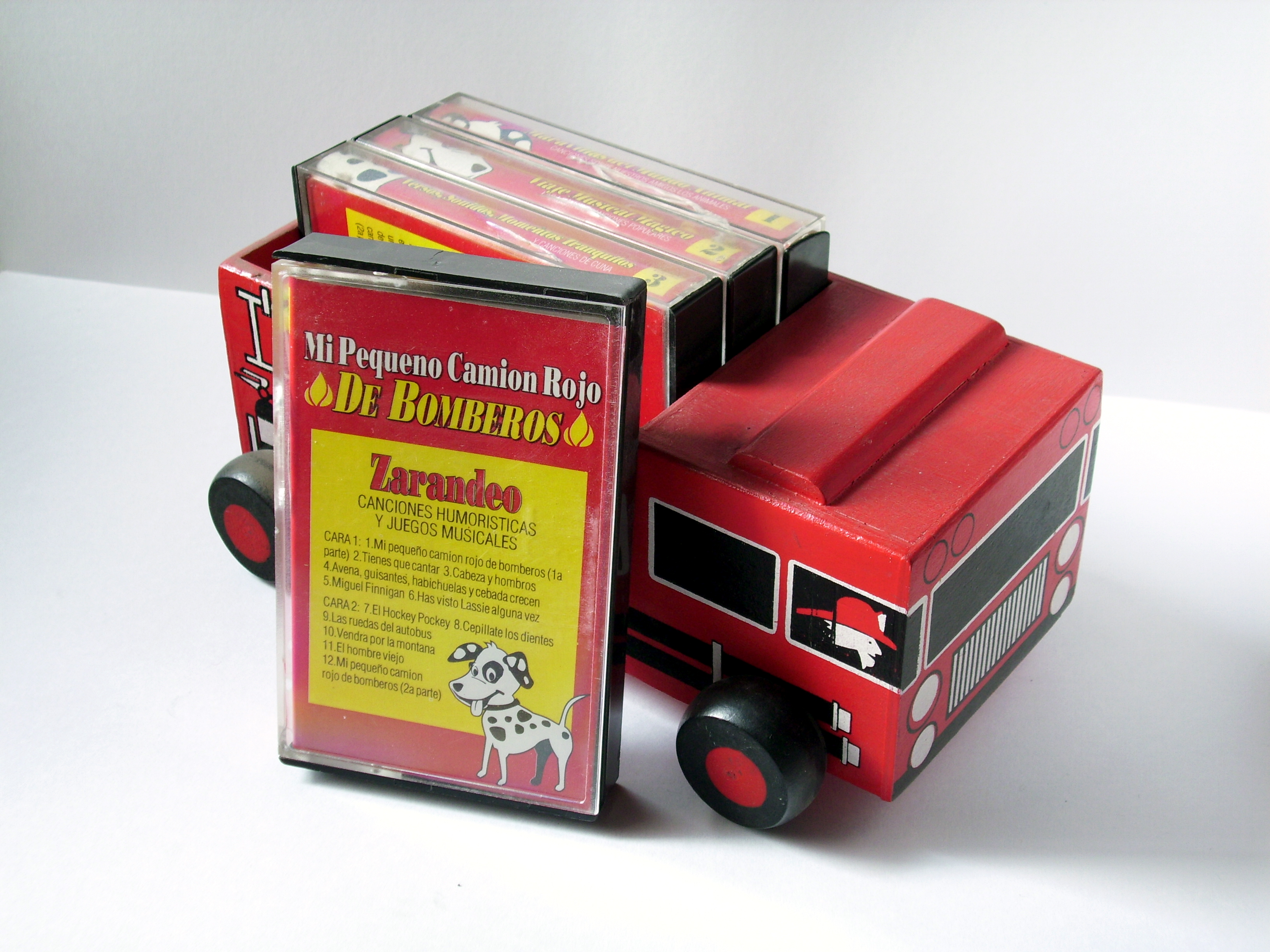
The Spanish language edition of My Little Red Firetruck Box Set (Mi pequeño camión rojo de bomberos).

- Jumpin' Up & Down (1993)
- Animal Wonders (My Little Yellow Bus Box Set) (1993)
- Magical Musical Journey: Best-Loved Folk Songs (My Little Yellow Bus Box Set) (1993)
- Rhymes, Chimes & Quiet Times: Favourite Nursery Rhymes and Lullabies (My Little Yellow Bus Box Set) (1993)
- Shake It All About (My Little Yellow Bus Box Set) (1993)
- My Little Red Firetruck Box Set (1993)
- My Little Red Firetruck Box Set Foreign Language Editions (1993)
- Livin' In a Shoe (1997)
- PigMania (2000)
- GoldiRocks (2000)
- Rock N' Roll Matzah Ball (2001)
- BeanStock (2001)
- Red's In the Hood (2001)
- Songs From the Boom Box (2001)
- Livin' In a Shoe Multimedia Edition (2002)
- MathJam K (2004)
- MathJam 1 (2005)
- MathJam 2 (2006)
- JiggiJump (2007)
- JiggiJump: Healthy Earth, Healthy Me (2011)

== Videography ==
- Judy & David's Music Shop - Live concert VHS (1996)
- Playground Jam - DVD (2004)
- Treasure Park - DVD (2004)
- Cars, Planes & Choo Choo Trains - DVD (2004)
