= Big Block SingSong =

2012 children's musical group

- Genre: Preschool; Musical; Comedy
- Created by: Warren Brown; Adam Goddard
- Directed by: Warren Brown
- Voices of: Adam Goddard; Stacey Kay
- Composer: Adam Goddard
- Country of origin: Canada
- Original language: English
- No. of series: 4
- No. of episodes: 89

Production
- Animator: Warren Brown
- Running time: 2 minutes
- Production company: Goddard/Brown

Original release
- Network: CBC Kids
- Release: 28 August 2012 – 2017

Big Block Singsong is a Canadian children's animated musical television series and group created by Warren Brown and Adam Goddard. They are best known for their regular series of animated music videos which have aired as interstitial programming on channels such as Disney Junior in the United States, Nick Jr. in the UK, ABC Kids in Australia and CBC Kids in Canada since 2012 and as the winners of the Juno Award for Children's Album of the Year at the Juno Awards of 2020 for their album Greatest Hits, Vol. 4. It is directed, designed, and animated by Brown and composed and sung by Goddard.

They received two previous Juno Award nominations at the Juno Awards of 2016 for Greatest Hits and at the Juno Awards of 2018 for Greatest Hits, Vol. 3.

The duo has also produced songs about letters and numbers for TVO Kids under the name ABC Singsong, under which they received two more Juno nominations at the Juno Awards of 2021 for Letters and Numbers and at the Juno Awards of 2022 for Words Words Words.

== Plot ==
Each episode features a different block shaped character, based on a real life thing, (e.g. an animal, a person, or even a concept or idea) singing a song, either about themselves, or what they do. They sing original songs in many different musical genres.

== Episodes ==
In total, the show ran for 4 series with 89 episodes.

Season	Episodes	Originally released	
Season	Episodes	First released	Last released
1	24	2012	2012
2	25	2013	2013
3	20	2014	2015
4	20	2016	2017

=== Series 1 (2012) ===
No.	Title	Directed by	Written by	Original release date
1	"Monkey" "Two-Banana Day"	Warren Brown	Adam Goddard & Warren Brown	2012
It's a two banana day for a monkey.
2	"Sleep" "Good Sleep"	Warren Brown	Adam Goddard & Warren Brown	2012
Take a trip on the sleepy train and have dreamy dreams.
3	"Hair"	Warren Brown	Adam Goddard & Warren Brown	2012
Hair shaped like a horse? Of course, it's hair.
4	"Happy" "We're Happy!"	Warren Brown	Adam Goddard & Warren Brown	2012
Everybody has a happy side!
5	"Teeth"	Warren Brown	Adam Goddard & Warren Brown	2012
Teeth are fantastic and they never go out of style!
6	"Noses"	Warren Brown	Adam Goddard & Warren Brown	2012
Everybody knows what a nose is. Do you?
7	"Sad"	Warren Brown	Adam Goddard & Warren Brown	2012
We've all worn a frown and that's okay.
8	"Octopus" "Octopus Pete"	Warren Brown	Adam Goddard & Warren Brown	2012
Have you ever seen a fancier creature than Octopus Pete?
9	"Bat" "Upside Down, Hanging Around"	Warren Brown	Adam Goddard & Warren Brown	2012
A bat is just hanging around upside down.
10	"Big Foot"	Warren Brown	Adam Goddard & Warren Brown	2012
Big Foot has some astronomical feet!
11	"Mad"	Warren Brown	Adam Goddard & Warren Brown	2012
Feeling mad? Get ready to cool it down.
12	"Eat"	Warren Brown	Adam Goddard & Warren Brown	2012
Eat, eat, eat to feel good all day long.
13	"Frog" "Would You Come To The Pond?"	Warren Brown	Adam Goddard & Warren Brown	2012
Come and see a frog's pond. You don't want to miss it.
14	"Moose" "In The Park"	Warren Brown	Adam Goddard & Warren Brown	2012
A moose really, really, really likes going to the park today.
15	"Good"	Warren Brown	Adam Goddard & Warren Brown	2012
A fellow is having a good day and you will too.
16	"Owl" "Peekaboo"	Warren Brown	Adam Goddard & Warren Brown	2012
Peek, peek, peekaboo! A boo boo boobity boo!
17	"Fruit" "15 Kinds of Fruit"	Warren Brown	Adam Goddard & Warren Brown	2012
So much fruit and so little time!
18	"Brave"	Warren Brown	Adam Goddard & Warren Brown	2012
Be brave because salad can be scary sometimes.
19	"Ears"	Warren Brown	Adam Goddard & Warren Brown	2012
Hear all the sounds that his ears hear.
20	"Colourful Day"	Warren Brown	Adam Goddard & Warren Brown	2012
Yellow? Hello! Join a colourful artist on his colourful day.
21	"Farmer" "Around The Farm"	Warren Brown	Adam Goddard & Warren Brown	2012
Around the farm, a farmer is doing his thing.
22	"Spider" "Opposites"	Warren Brown	Adam Goddard & Warren Brown	2012
Find out where a spider sits in his world of opposites.
23	"Robot"	Warren Brown	Adam Goddard & Warren Brown	2012
A robot has lots of questions and he's come for answers.
24	"Different" "We Are Different"	Warren Brown	Adam Goddard & Warren Brown	2012
An unlikely pair is totally cool with their many differences.

=== Series 2 (2013) ===
No. overall	No. in season	Title	Directed by	Written by	Original release date
25	1	"Princess"	Warren Brown	Adam Goddard & Warren Brown	2013
Watch out bad guys! She's a princess in an electric pink dress.
26	2	"Counting"	Warren Brown	Adam Goddard & Warren Brown	2013
Need advice on how to count? This is the cyclops you want to call!
27	3	"Space Friends"	Warren Brown	Adam Goddard & Warren Brown	2013
Beautiful friendships happen in space.
28	4	"Slug"	Warren Brown	Adam Goddard & Warren Brown	2013
He's a slug, not a bug. Let's keep that straight.
29	5	"Fun"	Warren Brown	Adam Goddard & Warren Brown	2013
You can't beat fun!
30	6	"Magician"	Warren Brown	Adam Goddard & Warren Brown	2013
Feel the magic!
31	7	"Chef"	Warren Brown	Adam Goddard & Warren Brown	2013
You'll never guess what this chef puts in the soup.
32	8	"Caveman"	Warren Brown	Adam Goddard & Warren Brown	2013
His name is Dave and he lives in a cave.
33	9	"Junk Food"	Warren Brown	Adam Goddard & Warren Brown	2013
Watch out for the junk food fever!
34	10	"Cowboy"	Warren Brown	Adam Goddard & Warren Brown	2013
Can you be a cowboy without a cow?
35	11	"Germs"	Warren Brown	Adam Goddard & Warren Brown	2013
Let's just say these germs like to get around.
36	12	"Time Traveller"	Warren Brown	Adam Goddard & Warren Brown	2013
Travel through time with this time travelling troubadour.
37	13	"Super Duper"	Warren Brown	Adam Goddard & Warren Brown	2013
Stan is a super duper guy!
38	14	"Dog"	Warren Brown	Adam Goddard & Warren Brown	2013
This doggy dog is the finest pet you'll ever meet. Woof, woof.
39	15	"Skills"	Warren Brown	Adam Goddard & Warren Brown	2013
Do you think that everyone has a skill? These guys sure do.
40	16	"Pirate"	Warren Brown	Adam Goddard & Warren Brown	2013
Treasure is this pirate's ticket to the good life. Too bad he can't find it right now.
41	17	"La Tee Dah"	Warren Brown	Adam Goddard & Warren Brown	2013
Time to stand at attention and pay respects to the land of La Tee Dah.
42	18	"Beats"	Warren Brown	Adam Goddard & Warren Brown	2013
Serving up a batch of tasty beats.
43	19	"Moustachios"	Warren Brown	Adam Goddard & Warren Brown	2013
Mucho macho muchachos with moustachios.
44	20	"Technology"	Warren Brown	Adam Goddard & Warren Brown	2013
Thank you technology from the bottom of our laser pants.
45	21	"Better Way"	Warren Brown	Adam Goddard & Warren Brown	2013
Let's all find a better way to work it through.
46	22	"Clown"	Warren Brown	Adam Goddard & Warren Brown	2013
It's not easy though, but someone has to be the clown.
47	23	"Wilderness"	Warren Brown	Adam Goddard & Warren Brown	2013
You like the wilderness if your best friend is a tree.
48	24	"Rock & Roll"	Warren Brown	Adam Goddard & Warren Brown	2013
She's got a rock & roll attitude!
49	25	"Here We Go"	Warren Brown	Adam Goddard & Warren Brown	2013
Anything can happen and it just might.

=== Series 3 (2014-2015) ===
No. overall	No. in season	Title	Directed by	Written by	Original release date
50	1	"Move It"	TBD	TBD	2014
Stand up! Stand up! Get up and go!
51	2	"Underwater"	TBD	TBD	2014
Come along on an underwater sea adventure.
52	3	"Give A Little"	TBD	TBD	2014
Give. Share. Feel the smiles everywhere!
53	4	"Try"	TBD	TBD	2014
Anything is possible, you just need to give it a go!
54	5	"Abominable Snowman"	TBD	TBD	2014
It's phenomenal being abominable.
55	6	"Better Together"	TBD	TBD	2014
We're better together than apart.
56	7	"Astronaut"	TBD	TBD	2014
This astronaut is so far out in outer space!
57	8	"Birthday"	TBD	TBD	2014
Birthday! Birthday! Celebrate the day that's all about you!
58	9	"Chickens"	TBD	TBD	2014
Bawk! Bawk! Bawk! Chickens!
59	10	"Spectacular"	TBD	TBD	2014
Leap into a bowl of awesome-sauce. He's spectacular!
60	11	"Eyeballs"	TBD	TBD	2015
Eyeballs! It's getting googly!
61	12	"Waiting"	TBD	TBD	2015
Sometimes the wait time is the great time.
62	13	"Toes"	TBD	TBD	2015
Toes are just so cool.
63	14	"Gorilla Gorilla"	TBD	TBD	2015
These gorillas are some fancy fine fellas!
64	15	"Family"	TBD	TBD	2015
Shake that family tree!
65	16	"Amazing"	TBD	TBD	2015
When you do your best, you're amazing!
66	17	"Cat"	TBD	TBD	2015
Love him! Love him! Love him! He's a cat and you got to love him.
67	18	"Loud"	TBD	TBD	2015
L-O-U-D! Everyone get loud!
68	19	"Vikings"	TBD	TBD	2015
Everybody needs a viking.
69	20	"Shapes"	TBD	TBD	2015
Shapes are everywhere!

=== Series 4 (2016-2017) ===
No. overall	No. in season	Title	Directed by	Written by	Original release date
70	1	"Bee"	TBD	TBD	2016
This bee is a lover, not a stinger!
71	2	"Wizard"	TBD	TBD	2016
He's a whiz at everything, well, except wizardly things.
72	3	"Share the Care"	TBD	TBD	2016
Share the care here, there and everywhere!
73	4	"Cows"	TBD	TBD	2016
These cows are on the loose and looking to raise the roof!
74	5	"What's Up"	TBD	TBD	2016
If that's what's up, he's down with that.
75	6	"Bears"	TBD	TBD	2016
Let's hear it for the bears!
76	7	"Activate"	TBD	TBD	2016
Recharge your batteries and activate!
77	8	"Imagine That"	TBD	TBD	2016
Think of what could happen when we all think together.
78	9	"Turkey Turkey"	TBD	TBD	2016
You gotta believe!
79	10	"Tidy Up"	TBD	TBD	2016
When things get messy, you gotta get clean.
80	11	"Butterfly"	TBD	TBD	2017
Mysterious and miraculous changes happen right before your eyes.
81	12	"Alien"	TBD	TBD	2017
Blast off on a super fantastic intergalactic tour!
82	13	"Nice"	TBD	TBD	2017
Forget rough or rude, being nice is her thing.
83	14	"Duck"	TBD	TBD	2017
It's a quack attack. You better stand back!
84	15	"Lion"	TBD	TBD	2017
This king of the jungle wants you to know just how kingly he can be.
85	16	"Hello"	TBD	TBD	2017
Discover what you might find by saying hello.
86	17	"Time"	TBD	TBD	2017
What time is it? Time to watch this video!
87	18	"Questions"	TBD	TBD	2017
Answers to questions that really make you think!
88	19	"Monsters"	TBD	TBD	2017
Do you like monsters? These monsters sure do.
89	20	"Dance"	TBD	TBD	2017
Time to dance!
