= Sonshine and Broccoli =

Canadian singing duo

Sonshine and Broccoli are a Canadian children's music duo, from Toronto, Ontario, consisting of Lisa Sonshine and Brock Burford. They are most noted for their 2018 album It's Cool to Be Kind, which was a Juno Award nominee for Children's Album of the Year at the Juno Awards of 2019. The duo met when they both attended Sheridan College.

== Discography ==
- Sonshine and Broccoli Jam (2004)
- Feel the Beat (2010)
- It's a Beautiful Day (2015)
- It's Cool to Be Kind (2018)
- Hug Life (2019)
- Born to Be Brave (2022)
