= Bob King (children's musician) =

Bob King is a Winnipeg-based Canadian children's musician and songwriter. King began his career in the 1970s together with Fred Penner and Al Simmons in the band Kornstock.

== Discography ==
- Children's songs (1990)

== Songs ==
Some of Bob King's songs have become standards in Canada and have been recorded by other artists. His two best known songs, which have sold a million copies apiece are "Sandwiches", full title "Sandwiches Are Beautiful", and "Brother for Sale".

"Sandwiches", with the beginning "Sandwiches are beautiful, Sandwiches are fine. I like sandwiches, I eat them all the time; I eat them for my supper and I eat them for my lunch", has been recorded by other Canadian's children's musicians including Fred Penner. The song has been cited in speech teaching books for teaching children pronunciation of "S", and appeared in media, such as sung in Winnipeg playwright Bruce Mcmanus's play Caffe.

"Brother for Sale" has also been recorded by other artists, including, as children, by twins Mary-Kate and Ashley Olsen.
