= Blake Pouliot =

Classical violinist (born 1994)

- Born: January 31, 1994 (age 31); Toronto, Canada
- Origin: Toronto
- Instrument: Violin
- Website: Official website

Blake Pouliot (born January 31, 1994) is a Juno-nominated Canadian professional classical violinist. Pouliot is currently Soloist-in-Residence at the Orchestre Métropolitain in Montreal.

== Early life and education ==
Pouliot was born in Toronto, Canada. At age seven he began violin, piano and theory lessons at The Royal Conservatory of Music in Toronto.

During his schooling years he was a member of a local string quartet and pop rock group and he served as Concertmaster of the Toronto Symphony Youth Orchestra, the National Youth Orchestra of Canada, and the Youth Orchestra of the Americas.

Pre-college he studied violin in Toronto with Marie Berard and Erika Raum before completing his Graduate Violin Performance Diploma at the Colburn School Conservatory of Music in Los Angeles, under the tutorage of violinist Robert Lipsett.

== Career ==
At age eleven Pouliot made his orchestral solo debut with the Trinity Strings Orchestra of Toronto. This was followed by solo performances with orchestras including the Aspen Philharmonic Orchestra, Montreal Symphony Orchestra, National Arts Center Orchestra, Pacific Symphony, Sofia Philharmonic Orchestra, Toronto Symphony Orchestra, Vancouver Symphony Orchestra, and the Colburn Orchestra. He has performed under conductors including Sir Neville Marriner, Nicolas McGegan, Vasily Petrenko, Carl St. Clair, Alain Trudel, and Hugh Wolff, and has performed with Yo Yo Ma and Diana Ross.

Pouliot has been featured on radio broadcasts including CBC Radio and served as Minnesota Public Radio's Performance Today's "Young Artist-in-Residence."

His 2018–2019 season included debut concerto performances with the Detroit, Dallas, Milwaukee, San Francisco, and Seattle Symphony Orchestras.

In 2019, Pouliot released his first album with pianist Hsin-I Huang under the Analekta Records label. Featuring both the Ravel Violin Sonata No. 2 in G and the Debussy Violin Sonata in G Minor, the album was nominated for the 2019 "Best Classical Album Solo/Chamber Ensemble' Juno Award. In 2021, he joined the Orchestre Métropolitain in Montreal, under musical director Yannick Nézet-Séguin.

== Awards and recognition ==
Pouliot's accolades include the Grand Prize at the Orchestre Symphonique de Montréal (OSM) Manulife Competition, the Dorothy Delay Aspen Festival Prize, the Grand Prize at the Canadian Federation of Music Festivals, and the Canada Council for the Arts Michael Measures and Virginia Parker Prizes.

As the top honoree at the 2015 and the 2018 Canada Council of the Arts Musical Instrument Bank Competition, he was awarded the six year loan of a 1729 Guarneri del Gesu violin — previously performed on by fellow Canadian countrymen, Timothy Chooi and Nikki Chooi. He has twice been featured on CBC’s "30 Hot Canadian Classical Musicians under 30" list.

== Personal life ==
Pouliot lives in New York.

He is known for the bright coloured ‘rock star’ clothing which he often enjoys wearing on stage during performances. Pouliot also appeared in two short movies in acting roles, performed in a television series, and played a private recital for the former Prime Minister of Canada, Stephen Harper.
