= The Swinging Belles =

Canadian children's music group

The Swinging Belles are a Canadian swing band for children based in St. John's, Newfoundland and Labrador. Known for their energetic performances and unique blend of swing music for young audiences, the group has won the Juno Award for Children's Album of the Year twice, in 2016 and 2024.

The band consists of child educators and performers Laura Winter and Erin Power, alongside award-winning guitarist Duane Andrews. Their work is grounded in the belief that children are intelligent and musically receptive, and their songs are designed to appeal to both children and their families. The group’s performances often include stories, puppetry, and dance elements, creating interactive and theatrical live shows.

Since their formation, The Swinging Belles have released four albums and performed in a wide range of venues, including schools, libraries, hospitals, bookstores, theatres, and festivals. Notable appearances include the Newfoundland and Labrador Folk Festival, the Winnipeg Folk Festival, the Calgary International Children's Festival, and La Semaine Acadienne in France.

In recent years, the group has begun exploring electro-swing, collaborating with emerging producer Isaac Andrews Power to create a new series of tracks.

Critics have praised the group’s innovative approach to children's music. Writing in The Newfoundland Herald, Dillon Collins stated: "The trio have all the tools to mesmerize tots from Paris to Texas, London to Istanbul and back."

== Discography ==
- More Sheep, Less Sleep (2014)
- Jingle Belles (2017)
- The Superstar Sibling Detective Agency (2018)
- Welcome to the Flea Circus (2022)

== Awards and nominations ==
- Juno Award for Children's Album of the Year – 2016 – More Sheep, Less Sleep
- Juno Award for Children's Album of the Year – 2024 – Welcome to the Flea Circus
