= Bobs & LoLo =

Vancouver-based children's music duo

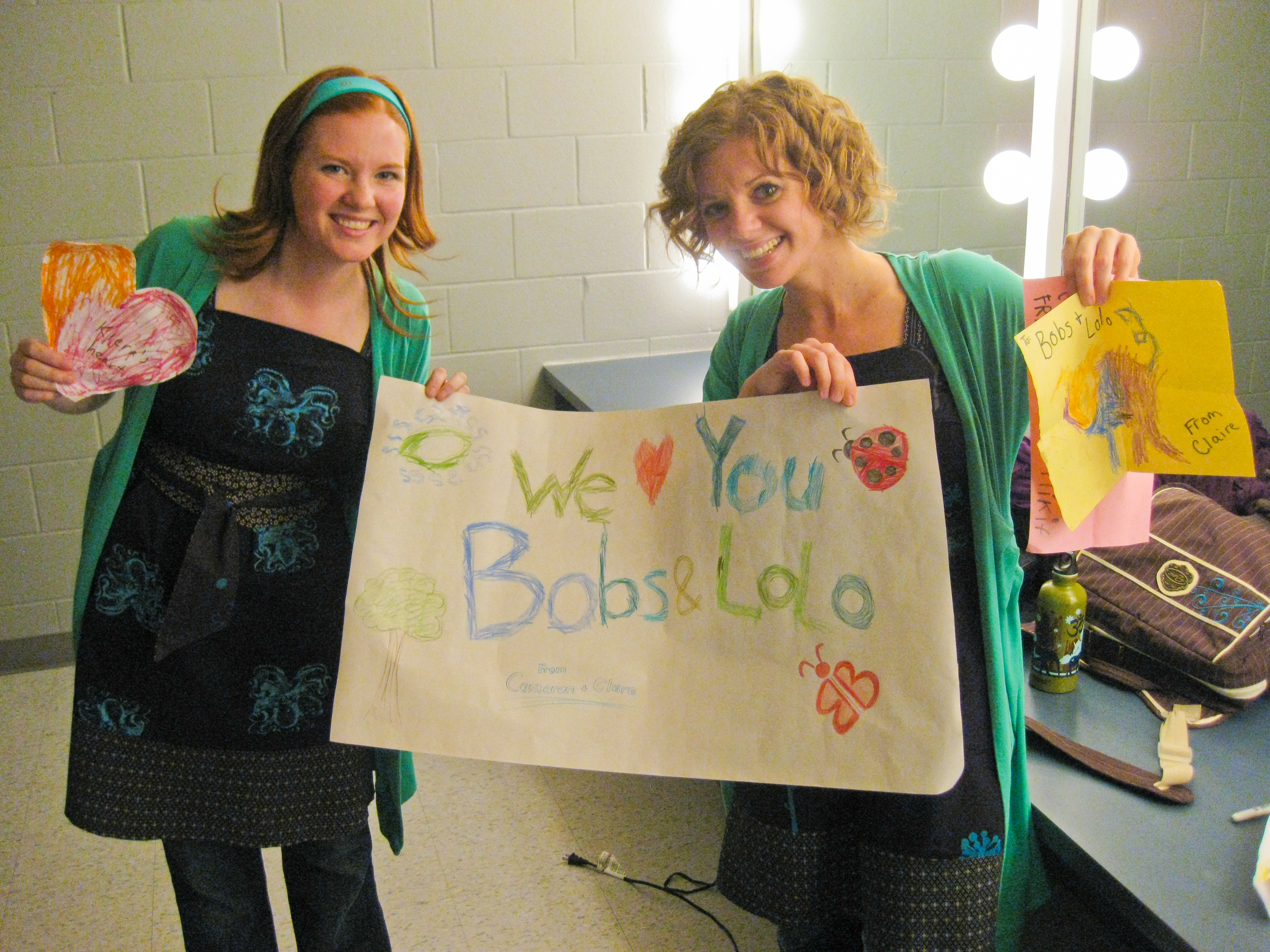
- Bobs & LoLo: Robyn Hardy (left), Lorraine Pond (right)

Background information
- Origin: Vancouver, BC
- Genres: Children's Music
- Years active: 2003–present
- Labels: Independent
- Members: Robyn Hardy; Lorraine Pond
- Website: www.bobsandlolo.com

Bobs & LoLo is a Vancouver-based children's music duo consisting of Robyn Hardy (Bobs) and Lorraine Pond (LoLo).

Originally formed in 2003, Bobs & LoLo gained initial success by performing at the Vancouver Aquarium, where Pond worked as an environmental educator. The following year, they recorded their first album, Sea Notes, which had a marine-based theme and introduced children to ocean life. Their second album, Musical Adventures (2006), features songs about healthy living, conserving wildlife and going green. In 2007, Bobs & LoLo released On Your Feet - A Musical Adventures DVD, which features 10 songs and full-length music videos from their second album, Musical Adventures. The following year, Bobs & LoLo released the album Action Packed, which features upbeat songs with kid-friendly analogies, and is dedicated to kids with action-packed lives. Their 2011 album, Connecting The Dots, features songs about the connections people make with themselves, each other, and the world around them.

Bobs & LoLo have won numerous awards, including a 2007 Parents' Choice Award: Silver Honour Award for Musical Adventures, a 2008 Parents' Choice Award for On Your Feet, a 2008 Children's Music Web Award for On Your Feet, a 2009 Parents' Choice Gold Award for Action Packed, a 2009 Canadian Indie Award Nomination for Favourite Children's Artist, a 2009 award for Best Children's Recording of the Year from the Western Canadian Music Alliance (WCMA), and a Juno nomination in 2010 (Action Packed), 2012 (Connecting The Dots) and 2015 (Wave Your Antlers).

Beginning in 2009, Bobs & LoLo music videos have aired regularly on Treehouse TV across Canada and Disney Junior (formerly Playhouse Disney) across the U.S.

== Early history ==
=== Pre-Bobs & LoLo ===
Robyn Hardy and Lorraine Pond met in Girl Guides at a Guide camp when they were both eight years old and grew up together in Nanaimo, where their love of the natural world was encouraged by their proximity to the Pacific Ocean and coastal rainforest on Vancouver Island. Hardy and Pond parted ways soon after meeting, but they reconnected in high school with a shared love of nature and an enjoyment for teaching children. Music was also a constant as both Hardy and Pond took piano lessons from the same teacher as children and were also in the school choir and an a cappella ensemble.

After graduating high school, Pond moved to Vancouver to attend the University of British Columbia (UBC), where she received a Bachelor of Human Kinetics degree, after which she started working at the Vancouver Aquarium. Hardy moved to Victoria to attend the University of Victoria, where she received a Bachelor of Arts, with an honours degree majoring in linguistics. After finishing her degree, Hardy then studied at UBC and received a Bachelor of Education degree. She then started teaching in the local school district.

=== Formation and early success ===
In 2003, Pond was working as an environmental educator at the Vancouver Aquarium, and Hardy working as an elementary school teacher in Vancouver, when they had a conversation about using music to educate and teach. Their conversation inspired them to write their first few songs, among them "See a Sea Lion" and "I Wish I Was a Jellyfish". Hardy and Pond decided the name for their duo should be "Bobs & LoLo", from nicknames they had in high school.

Eventually, Bobs & LoLo started to perform their songs in front of friends, at parties, and almost anywhere someone would let them play. They got positive reception, so Pond approached the Vancouver Aquarium, where she worked, about doing a musical show for children that would educate them about the marine environment. The aquarium agreed, and gave Bobs & LoLo their first steady show, essentially launching their career. Following positive reviews for their performances at the aquarium, Bobs & Lolo began performing at Vancouver-area schools and numerous private and community events.

== Musical career ==
=== Sea Notes (2004) ===
In 2004, Bobs & Lolo released their debut album, entitled Sea Notes. This entirely original collection of ocean-themed compositions was designed to educate young listeners on marine life. To ensure the music appealed beyond the typical children's demographic, Bobs & LoLo blended a wide range of genres, such as jazz, rock, blues and pop. This proved to be a success with parents, who were happy to finally have children's music they could enjoy listening to with their kids, later proven with numerous Parents' Choice awards.

The album was very popular. In the first three years, Sea Notes sold over 6,000 copies; almost unheard of for an independent music release.

In April 2009, Bobs & LoLo announced the re-packaging of Sea Notes in eco-friendly materials, including packaging printed on Forest Stewardship Council (FSC) certified stock, vegetable-based inks, waterless printing technology, and 100% recyclable CD trays.

=== Musical Adventures (2006) ===
In 2006, Bobs & LoLo released their second album, Musical Adventures. This album had the themes of healthy living, conserving wildlife and going green, marking the duo's first departure from ocean-based lyrics. However, they did keep with their successful musical style employed in Sea Notes; composing songs in various genres with kid-oriented lyrics.

After the release of the album, Bobs & LoLo continued to play shows to promote their music. In the year following the release of Musical Adventures, they played over 250 shows all over Canada, from BC to Prince Edward Island. In December 2007 alone they played over 50 shows.

This album also brought Bobs & LoLo their first major award, receiving the 2007 Parents' Choice Award: Silver Honors award. It was also nominated at the 2007 Western Canadian Music Awards for Outstanding Children's Recording of the Year.

=== On Your Feet DVD (2007) ===
After seeing the success of Musical Adventures in 2006, Bobs & LoLo decided to create a DVD of 10 music videos of songs from Musical Adventures and Sea Notes. The DVD, titled On Your Feet (from the title track of Musical Adventures), was released in December 2007.

Each music video is introduced by a short animated title, followed by the introduction of Bobs & LoLo, often with children playing or dancing around them. The videos were shot in and around Vancouver, and all the scenes are either of the spectacular natural scenery, or of colorful indoor sets. Like in their live performances, Bobs & LoLo dressed in identical outfits, with many costume changes.

On Your Feet won Bobs & LoLo a 2008 Parents' Choice Award, and a 2008 Children's Music Web award: Best DVD for Preschoolers.

=== Action Packed (2008) ===
In the fall of 2008, Bobs & LoLo went into the studio to record their third album. This album, released later in 2008, was titled Action Packed. As the name suggests, this album featured 12 new songs aimed at persuading kids to do actions and behaviors that positively impact themselves and others. The songs had themes such as literacy, healthy eating, fitness and teamwork. Musically, the album stayed on the same track as Sea Notes (2004), and Musical Adventures (2006), complementing the musical styles of the previous albums.

With this album came more awards for Bobs & LoLo. First, they won a 2009 Parents' Choice Gold Award, followed by a 2009 award for Best Children's Recording of the Year from the Western Canadian Music Alliance (WCMA), as well as their first Juno nomination in 2010.

=== Connecting The Dots (2011) ===
In May 2011, Bobs & LoLo released their fourth album, Connecting The Dots. This album's content was aimed at inspiring kids to observe, explore and connect with the world around them, and how connections exist between different things and people. The songs have themes of social and familial connections, environmental awareness, and individual awareness. Connecting The Dots was nominated for a 2011 Western Canadian Music Alliance (WCMA) award for Best Children's Recording of the Year. It also earned Bobs & LoLo their second Juno nomination.

=== Wave Your Antlers (2014) ===
In late 2014, Bobs & LoLo released their fifth album, a Christmas venture, Wave Your Antlers. It featured traditional Christmas classics as well as original Bobs & LoLo holiday songs. Wave Your Antlers went on to be nominated for a Juno in 2015 for Children's Album of the Year, the duo's third such nomination.

=== Dirty Feet (2015) ===
On July 31, 2015, Bobs & LoLo released their sixth album, Dirty Feet, their first major label release with Nettwerk Records. The album's content was inspired by summer days, imaginative play, and finding adventure in every day. Dirty Feet went on to be nominated for a Juno in 2016 for Children's Album of the Year, the duo's fourth such nomination.

Blue Skies (2017)

In 2017, Bobs & Lolo released their seventh album, Blue Skies. This album includes their CanadaSound Project track, Listen To The Sounds, in honor of Canada's 150th and part of CBC Music’s Music Class Challenge. Blue Skies was nominated for a 2018 Juno Children's Album of the Year Award.

== Discography ==
- Sea Notes (2004)
- Musical Adventures (2006)
- On Your Feet DVD (2007)
- Action Packed (2008)
- Connecting The Dots (2011)
- Wave Your Antlers (2014)
- Dirty Feet (2015)
- Blue Skies (2017)
