= Fred Penner =

Canadian children's music performer (born 1946)

Fred Penner CM OM
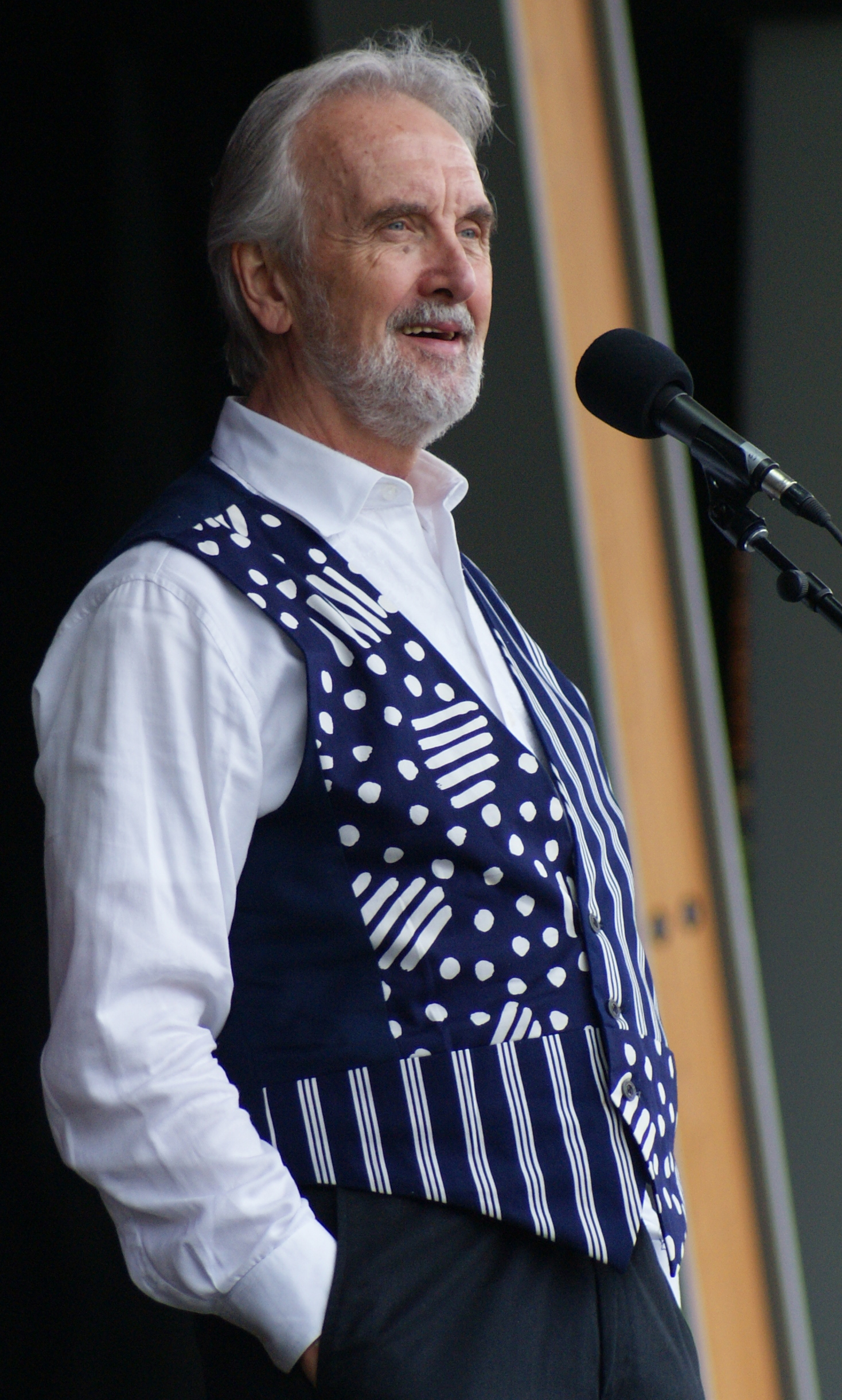
- Born: Frederick Ralph Cornelius Penner; November 6, 1946 (age 79); Winnipeg, Manitoba, Canada
- Education: University of Winnipeg
- Occupations: Singer; guitarist
- Known for: Fred Penner's Place (1985–1997)
- Spouses: Odette Heyn (m. 1981; div. 2011); Rae Ellen Bodie (m. 2016)
- Website: fredpenner.com

Frederick Ralph Cornelius Penner CM OM (born November 6, 1946) is a Canadian children's entertainer and musician known for the song "The Cat Came Back" and his television series, Fred Penner's Place, which aired on CBC in Canada from 1985 to 1997 and in the United States on Nickelodeon from 1989 to 1993.

== Life and career ==
=== Early life ===
Penner was born on November 6, 1946, in Winnipeg, Manitoba, to Lydia Agathe Penner (née Winters, 1913–2005) and Edward W. Penner of Winkler, Manitoba. By the age of four, he had begun making up songs while travelling on the bus with his mother. He taught himself how to play the guitar when he was in grade school, and performed in school choirs and pageants. Through his experiences with his sister Susan, who had Down syndrome, he recognized the therapeutic value of music.

Penner received his high school diploma at Kelvin High School, where he took lead roles in the Gilbert and Sullivan operettas. After graduating from the University of Winnipeg with a Bachelor of Arts degree in economics and psychology, he spent time working with mentally and physically disabled children, using music to comfort and entertain.

=== Music and television career ===
By 1972, Penner was a full-time professional musician, performing folk music songs in Winnipeg. In the mid-70s, Penner performed in a number of groups, most notably the folk music group Kornstock, along with Al Simmons, Bob King, both of whom also became well-known children's entertainers, and drummer Mike Klym.

In 1977, Penner met choreographer and future wife, Odette Graziella Heyn, with whom he started a children's dance theatre company called Sundance. Penner accepted an offer to do a recording, which resulted in the album The Cat Came Back.

In 1984, he appeared on the children's television show, The Elephant Show, singing "The Cat Came Back" and was given his own show, Fred Penner's Place the next year. The show became a hit and aired on CBC in Canada from 1985 to 1997 and in the United States on Nickelodeon from 1989 to 1993. The show is known for Penner's musical performances, special guests, puppets including Word Bird, and the famous title sequence, which features Penner's entry through a hollow log. The show won or received nominations for several awards including a Juno Award in 1989 and a Gemini Award in 1994. Penner recorded more than 900 episodes of the show. Since the show ended, Penner continues to perform and record regularly.

== Accolades ==
Penner has received a Juno Award for Children's Album of the Year four times: in 1989, 2003, 2015 and 2018.

In 1991, he was made a Member of the Order of Canada for "using music and song to entertain and educate his young audience". In 2011, he was made a Member of the Order of Manitoba.

Penner received an Honorary Doctorate of Letters from the University of Alberta June 15, 2023 for his lifetime of work supporting inclusivity and children's advocacy.

== Personal life ==
As of 2022, Penner lives with his second wife in Courtenay, British Columbia. Previously he split his time between Winnipeg and Toronto. He has four children by his first marriage to Odette Heyn. He remarried in 2016, to theatre director Rae Ellen Bodie. His daughter Hayley Gene Penner is a songwriter.

Penner has promoted a number of humanitarian causes with UNESCO, UNICEF, World Vision and the National Conference on Down Syndrome.

== Filmography ==
=== Film ===
Year	Title	Role	Notes
1984	Reunion		Short film
1993	What a Day!	Himself	Short film Director; Writer
2014	Fred Heads	Himself	Documentary
2014	Lennon or McCartney	Himself	Documentary
2016	Lovesick		Documentary
2017	Northern Folk	Himself	Documentary; Composer

=== Television ===
Year	Title	Role	Notes
1984	Sharon, Lois, & Bram's Elephant Show	Himself	Season 1, episode 10: "Lifestyles"
1985-1997	Fred Penner's Place	Himself	Composer; Writer
1992	Mr. Dressup	Himself	Episode: 25th Anniversary cameo
1994	The Biggest Little Ticket		Television film
1998	The Adventures of Shirley Holmes	Bill Marshall	Season 2, episode 6: "The Case of the Exploding Puppet"
2001	It's A Living - S13, Ep 12	Himself/Captain Hook	Sword fights actor Derek Aasland in a flying machine.
2003-2007	Tipi Tales	Composer	Composer of the theme song
2015	The Plateaus	Fred Penners	Appeared in three episodes
2015	Sunnyside	Barber	Season 1, episode 12: "Sunnyside Tours"
2019	Cavendish	Himself (poster, wax statue)	Season 1; multiple episodes
2019 -	Miss Persona	Grampy	Multiple episodes

== Discography ==
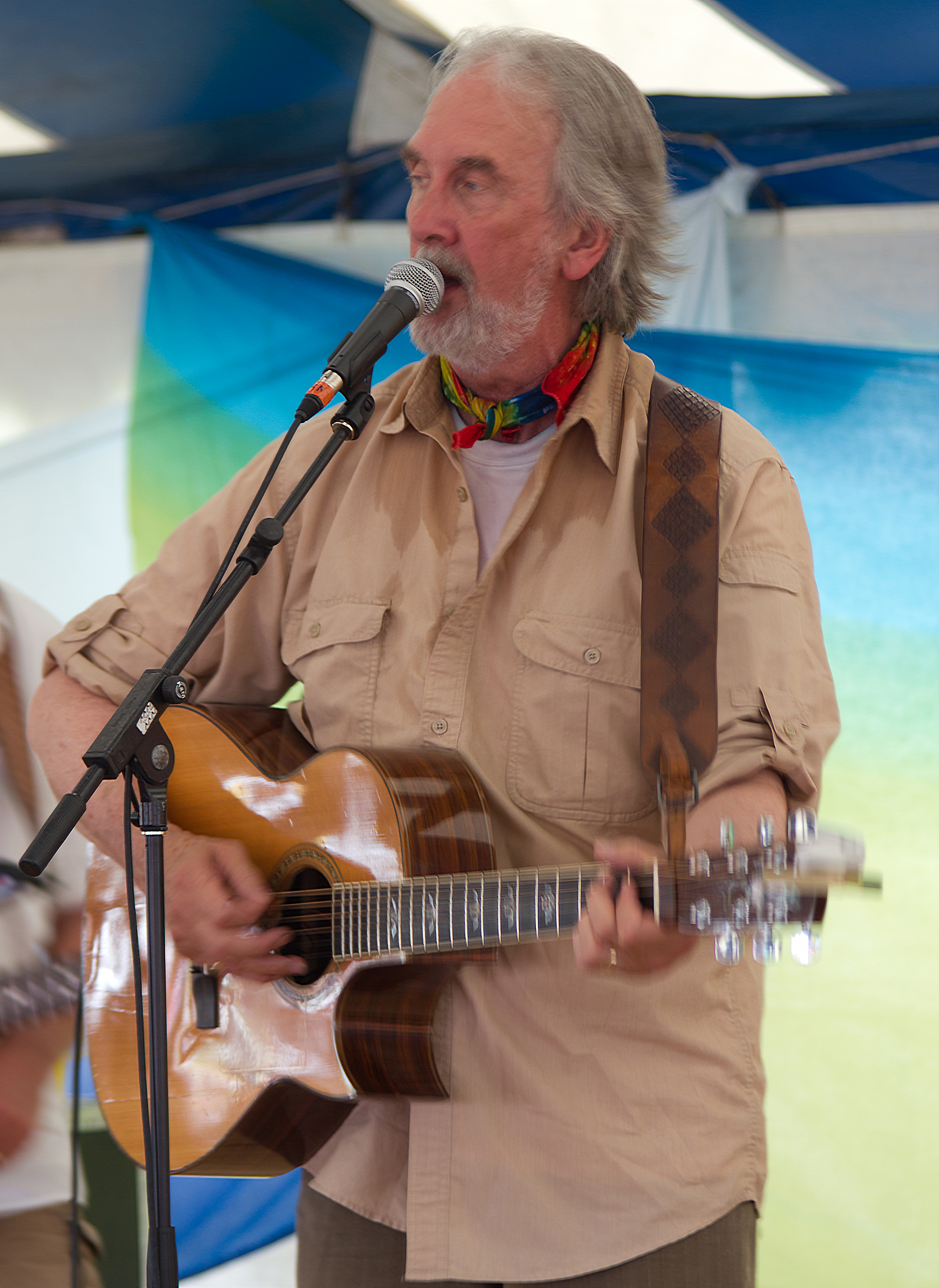
Penner performing in 2011

- The Cat Came Back (1979)
- Poco (1981)
- Ebeneezer Sneezer (1983)
- A House for Me (1985)
- Fred Penner's Place (1988)
- Collections (1989)
- The Season (reissued as Christmastime) (1990)
- Happy Feet (1992)
- What A Day! (1994)
- Moonlight Express (1996)
- Fred's Favourites (1998)
- Sing With Fred (2002)
- Storytime (2004)
- Rhyme a Word or Two (2004)
- My First Adventures (2004)
- I'm Growing (2004)
- Where In The World (2014)
- Hear The Music (2017)

== Sources ==
- "Canadian Who's Who 1997 entry". Archived from the original on August 2, 2009.
