= Juno Award for Global Music Album of the Year =

Canadian music award

The Juno Award for Global Music Album of the Year has been awarded since 1992, as recognition each year for the best world music album in Canada. It has previously been known as other names including "Best World Best Recording" and "Best World Music Album", with the current name being established in 2022.

== Winners ==
=== Best World Beat Recording (1992 - 1993) ===
Year	Winner	Album	Nominees	Ref.
1992	Various Artists (Billy Bryans, producer)	The Gathering	Haï Musik — Anoosh; Innu — Kashtin; The Flying Bulgar Klezmer Band — Flying Bulgar Klezmer Band; Till the Bars Break — Jeannette Armstrong	
1993	Jane Bunnett	Spirits of Havana	All Over the World — Sattalites; Invisible Minority — Salvador Ferreras; Listen to the World — Kaleefah; The Prodigal Son — Show-Do-Man	

=== Best Global Recording (1994 - 1995) ===
Year	Winner	Album	Nominees	Ref.
1994	Ancient Cultures	El Camino Real	Agada: Tales from Our Ancestors — Flying Bulgar Klezmer Band; Condor Meets the Eagle — Kanatan Aski with Pura Fé; Crossing Selkirk Avenue — Finjan; Enat — Mother Tongue	
1995	Eval Manigat	Africa +	Dancing on the Moon Contigo — Oscar Lopez; Indiscretion — Djole; Nene — Alpha Yaya Diallo; Nine-Fold Heart — Lee Pui Ming	

=== Best Global Album (1996 - 2002) ===
Year	Winner	Album	Nominees	Ref.
1996	Takadja	Music From Africa	Alegria — Cirque du Soleil; Jmpn for Joy — Punjabi by Nature; Vamo a Pambicha — Papo Ross and Orquesta Pambiche; When Ahab Met Moishe — The Angstones	
1997	Paulo Ramos Group	Africa Do Brasil	Anhata — Randev Pandit; Asza — Asza; Futur — Alpha Yaya Diallo; Gravity — Jesse Cook	
1998	Lhasa	La Llorona	Arc — Thomas Handy Trio; Chamalongo — Jane Bunnett; Diye — Takadja; Varal — Celso Machado	
1999	Alpha Yaya Diallo	The Message	Endless — Silk Road Music; Karsilama — Karsilama; Por El Sol — Diego Marulanda & Pacande; Vertigo — Jesse Cook	
2000	Madagascar Slim	Omnisource	Bambatulu — Lilison Di Kinara; Entente Cordiale — Show-Do-Man; Firedance — Toronto Tabla Ensemble; Jongo Le — Celso Machado	
2001	Jane Bunnett and the Spirits of Havana	Ritmo + Soul	Dancing on Water — Finjan; Esprit — Quartango; Free Fall — Jesse Cook; Morumba Cubana — Puentes Brothers	
2002	Alpha Yaya Diallo	The Journey	Alma De Santiago — Jane Bunnett; Distant Wind — Mei Han and Randy Raine-Reusch; Havana Remembered — Hilario Durán; Kashish Attraction — Kiran Ahluwalia	

=== World Music Album of the Year (2003 - 2021) ===
Year	Winner	Album	Nominees	Ref.
2003	Jeszcze Raz	Balagane	la fiesta mondiale de percussion — The Beat; Cuban Odyssey — Jane Bunnett; Raphael Geronimo's Rumba Calzada Vol. 3 — Raphael Geronimo; Hypnotika — Maza Mezé	
2004	Kiran Ahluwalia	Beyond Boundaries	Nomad — Jesse Cook; Sweet Return — Flying Bulgar Klezmer Band; Intakto — Intakto; The Living Road — Lhasa	
2005	Mighty Popo, Madagascar Slim, Donné Robert, Alpha Yaya Diallo, Adam Solomon, Pa Joe	African Guitar Summit	Dho-Mach (Sacred Gift) — Achilla Orru; En Voyage — Les Gitans de Sarajevo; Four Higher — Autorickshaw; Road to Kashgar — Orchid Ensemble	
2006	Alex Cuba	Humo De Tabaco	Capivara — Celso Machado; Djama — Alpha Yaya Diallo; Fusion — Adham Shaikh; Gaïa — Gaïa	
2007	Lubo Alexandrov	Kaba Horo	African Guitar Summit II — Alpha Yaya Diallo, Mighty Popo, Adam Solomon, Pa Joe, Madagascar Slim and Donné Robert; Bahiatronica — Monica Freire; Coeur vagabond — Bïa; The Edge — Mr. Something Something	
2008	Alex Cuba	Agua del Pozo	Frontiers — Jesse Cook; Jogo da Vida — Celso Machado; So the Journey Goes — Autorickshaw; Wanderlust — Kiran Ahluwalia	
2009	Jayme Stone and Mansa Sissoko	Africa to Appalachia	The Art of the Early Egyptian Qanun — George Dimitri Sawa; Cairo to Toronto — Maryem & Ernie Tollar; Contrabanda — Lubo and Kaba Horo; Shivaboom — Eccodek	
2010	Dominic Mancuso	Comfortably Mine	Alex Cuba — Alex Cuba; La danse de l’exilé — Karim Saada; Slide to Freedom 2: Make a Better World — Doug Cox and Salil Bhatt; Sunplace — Jaffa Road	
2011	Élage Diouf	Aksil	Gakondo — Mighty Popo; The Rumba Foundation — Jesse Cook; Soy Panamericano — Roberto López Project; Supermagique — Pacifika	
2012	Kiran Ahluwalia	Aam Zameen: Common Ground	From Night to the Edge of Day — Azam Ali; Afo Gné — Aboulaye Kone and Bolo Kan; Flores, Tambores e Amores — Aline Morales; Sleepover — Socalled	
2013	Lorraine Klaasen	Tribute to Miriam Makeba	Ruido en el Sistema — Alex Cuba; Where the Light Gets In — Jaffa Road; Black Birds Are Dancing Over Me — Danny Michel; Solidarity — The Souljazz Orchestra	
2014	David Buchbinder & Odessa/Havana	Walk to the Sea	Sabor A Café — Adonis Puentes; Lamentation of Swans: A Journey Towards Silence — Azam Ali and Loga R. Torkian; Jumbie in the Jukebox — Kobo Town; Lume, Lume — The Lemon Bucket Orkestra	
2015	Quique Escamilla	500 Years of Night	Ayrad — Ayrad; Singing in Tongues — Eccodek; The Key — Emmanuel Jal; Le dernier empereur bantou — Pierre Kwenders	
2016	Boogat	Neo-Reconquista	Healer — Alex Cuba; Revuelta Danza Party — Gypsy Kumbia Orchestra; Moorka — The Lemon Bucket Orkestra; Resistance — The Souljazz Orchestra	
2017	Okavango African Orchestra	Okavango African Orchestra	Nouvelle Journée — Lorraine Klaasen; Subcontinental Drift — Sultans of String; Nazar — Turkwaz; Dance of the Infidels — Nomadica	
2018	Kobo Town	When the Galleon Sank	Meter — Autorickshaw; La Migra — The Battle of Santiago; A New Tradition Vol. 2: Return of the KUISi — Beny Esguerra and New Tradition; Femme — Briga	
2019	Wesli	Rapadou Kreyol	Zoubida — Ayrad; San Cristóbal Baile Inn — Boogat; Naath — Emmanuel Jal and Nyaruach; Fuerza Arara — Telmary y Habana Sana	
2020	Djely Tapa	Barokan	Risorgimento — Romina Di Gasbarro; Sombras — Okan; Africa Without Borders — Okavango African Orchestra; Galactic Gala — Silla + Rise	
2021	Okan	Espiral	VelkomBak — Gypsy Kumbia Orchestra; The Gold Diggers — Lengaïa Salsa Brava; Patria — Mazacote; Kora Flamenca — Zal Sissokho	

=== Global Music Album of the Year (2022 - present) ===
Year	Winner	Album	Nominees	Ref.
2022	Afrikana Soul Sister	Kalasö	Mendó — Alex Cuba; Northside Kuisi: A New Tradition, Vol. 3 — Beny Esguerra and New Tradition Music; OYA — Donné Roberts; SMS for Location, Vol. 4 — Moonshine	
2023	Lenka Lichtenberg	Thieves of Dreams	In the Footsteps of Rumi — Ghalia Benali, Constantinople and Kiya Tabassian; José Louis and the Paradox of Love — Pierre Kwenders; Tradisyon — Wesli; Vox.Infold — Ruby Singh	
2024	Okan	Okantomi	Bel and Quinn, Donte sann yo; Kizaba, Kizavibe; Moonshine, SMS for Location Vol. 5; Waahli, Soap Box	
2025	Djely Tapa	Dankoroba	Ramon Chicharron, Niebla; Didon, Malak; Ahmed Moneka, Kanzafula; Abby V, Aarambh	
2026	Kazdoura	Ghoyoum	Didon, Bab El Mdina; Kizaba, Future Village; PIQSIQ, Legends; Salin, Rammana	
