= Okan (band) =

Canadian Afro-Cuban jazz group

Okan is a Juno Award-winning Canadian Afro-Cuban jazz group, whose core members are Cuban Canadian musicians Elizabeth Rodriguez and Magdelys Savigne, both former members of Jane Bunnett's band Maqueque. They perform both as a duo, and as leaders of a larger combo featuring session musicians.

== History ==
Rodriguez and Savigne left Maqueque in 2017 to form Okan. They were nominated for World Music Album of the Year at the Juno Awards of 2020 for their 2019 debut album Sombras.

They are noted for their 2020 album Espiral, which won the Juno Award for World Music Album of the Year at the Juno Awards of 2021. Their 2023 album, Okantomi, won the same award at the Juno Awards of 2024.

== Discography ==
=== Albums ===
- Sombras (2019)
- Espiral (2020)
- Okantomi (2023)

=== Extended Play ===
- Laberinto (2018)

=== Singles ===
- Luz (2018)
- Mas Que Nada (2019)
- Yemaya (Ile Ladde) with Rauzzy Ferrer (2022)
- Iglú (2023)
- La Reina Del Norte (2023)
- Okantomi (2023)
- Bailando en tu vibra with Ramon Chicharron (2024)
- + Que 1 Chingx with Boogát (2024)

=== Appearances ===
- AAA with Phosphore (2021)
- Toadas do Norte with Aline Morales and Anita Graciano (2021)
- Del Horizonte with Boogát (2024)
- Niebla with Ramon Chicharron (2024)
