= Afrikana Soul Sister =

Canadian Afrobeat group

Afrikana Soul Sister is an Afrobeat group from Montreal, Quebec. They are most noted for their 2021 album Kalasö, which was a Juno Award nominee for Global Music Album of the Year at the Juno Awards of 2022 and won the Félix Award for World Music Album of the Year at the 44th Félix Awards in 2022.

The band consists of singer Djely Tapa, multi-instrumentalist Jean-François Lemieux and percussionist Fa Cissohko.

They released the album Afrikana Soul Sister in 2017, and followed up with Kalasö in 2021. Djely Tapa also released the solo album Barokan in 2019, which won the Juno Award in the World Music category at the Juno Awards of 2020.
