= Lester Quitzau =

Canadian folk and blue guitarist (born 1964)

- Birth name: Lester Quitzau
- Born: September 21, 1964 (age 60)
- Origin: Edmonton, Alberta, Canada
- Genres: Blues; Folk; Jazz
- Occupation: Guitarist
- Instrument: guitars

Lester Quitzau (born September 21, 1964) is a Canadian folk and blues guitarist from Edmonton, Alberta.

In addition to his own albums, he also collaborates with the roots trio Tri-Continental with Bill Bourne and Madagascar Slim, and tours and records with his wife, folk-pop singer Mae Moore.

== Discography ==
- Keep on Walking (1994)
- A Big Love (1996)
- Tri-Continental (2000)
- So Here We Are (2001)
- Live (2002, with Tri-Continental)
- Let's Play (2003, with Tri-Continental)
- Oh My! (2004, with Mae Moore)
- Drifting (2004, with Tri-Continental)
- The Same Light (2009)
- Dust Dance (2018, with Tri-Continental)
