= Adam Solomon =

Kenyan composer and musician

Adam "The Professor" Solomon (born 1 January 1963 in Mombasa, Kenya) is a Juno Award–winning composer, guitar maestro, and singer. Solomon began performing at an early age, playing the kivoti (flute) and the kayamba (shaker) at village celebrations and festivals. He established his career playing lead guitar and singing on recordings and videos with some of Kenya's most popular bands and musicians, including Joseph Kamaru, Bana Citoyen, Super Kalles, Super Mazembe, Les Wanyika, Popo Lipo of Lessa Lessan, Professor Mb. Naaman with the Nine Stars Band, Kanda Bongo Man, Fadhili Williams, Juma Toto, and the Mombasa Roots Band. Adam's touring credits include workshops and performances with Congolese superstar Papa Wemba and Ismael Lo from Senegal.

== Discography ==
Solomon was a co-founder (with Tarig Abubakar) of Canada's great pan-African band, the Afronubians, with whom he toured western Canada in 1993. He collaborated with them for two CD releases, "Tour To Africa" (1994) and "The Great Africans" (1995). "Afronubians Live" was released posthumously in 2005. Solomon collaborated on Show Do Man's release "Trouble Trouble" (1994), also on "Tae Kwarro" album in the year 2000 by Achilla Orru. Based in Toronto, Ontario, Canada, Solomon then formed his own band, Tikisa, in 1995, and has continued to perform and tour with them. He has released the following albums: "Safari" (1996), "Rocket Express II: African Renaissance Blues" (2003), and "Mti wa Maisha (Tree of Life)" (2006). In 2007, Solomon released "Roots Rhythms (Magoma Asili)", an homage to the traditional rhythms and the Griots of the Mijikenda (Nine Tribes) people of coastal Kenya. The "Safari" album led to a double win at the TAMA (Toronto African Music Awards) for Best Release and Best New Performers in 1997.

== Collaboration with African Guitar Summit ==
In conjunction with the Canadian Broadcasting Company (CBC), Solomon continues to perform with a diverse group of pan-African musicians, including Madagascar Slim and Donne Roberts (Madagascar), Pa Joe, Theo yaw Boakye and Kofi Ackah(Ghana), Alpha Yaya Diallo and Naby Camara (Guinea) and Mighty Popo (Burundi/Rwanda). This collaboration culminated in the release of the "African Guitar Summit" CD in 2004. This led to a Juno award for World Music Album of the Year in 2005. The same year, Solomon and his African Guitar Summit colleagues performed at the Live 8 Concert at Park Place in Barrie as part of the ONE Campaign spearheaded by Bob Geldof. The "African Guitar Summit II" CD was released and subsequently resulted in a 2007 Juno nomination in the same category .

== Performances ==
Solomon has also done several live recordings with the CBC, and has toured extensively across Canada, performing at music festivals as varied as Afrofest and the Toronto Street Festival, Whistler Festival, Winnipeg Folk Festival, Montreal Jazz Festival, Salmon Arm Roots and Blues Festival, the University of Toronto's Music of All Latitudes series, and the Blues Summit for the Toronto Blues Society. Recently, Solomon and his group, Tikisa, performed at the Detroit Institute of Arts for their 44th annual Bal Africain, in the presence of Nene Sakite II (King of Manya Krobe, Ghana).

Solomon has done work for the Toronto International Film Festival, and participated in documentaries including "The Immigrants" (produced by Jack Orlando), and the award-winning "Jambo Kenya" and "Move Your World" (produced by Lalita Krishna & InSync Video).

== Contributions ==
Contributing to fundraisers and benefits, specifically related to the plight of HIV/AIDS orphans in Africa, the building of schools and the provision of clean water, is a priority of Solomon's. A short list of those performances includes: "For the Children of Africa" (Rotary Club of Toronto), "Music for AIDS in Africa" for Africville, "Hearts for Smarts" for the Canada Mathare Education Trust, and the United Kenyans of Chicago's "Give Hope to the Children" benefit.

Solomon sings in six languages, including Swahili, English, and Arabic. He is known as "The Professor". He has become a contributor to cultural education through music and storytelling in schools, libraries and workshops. In addition, he is a bass and rhythm guitar player, and is facile on the keyboard and percussion instruments too.

Solomon is a current member of the Toronto Musician's Association, OCFF, CARAS and SOCAN.
