= The Gathering (compilation album) =

Studio album by various artists
- Released: 1991
- Genre: World music
- Label: Attic Records
- Producer: Billy Bryans

The Gathering is a compilation album of Canadian artists in world music genres, released in 1991. Produced by former Parachute Club drummer Billy Bryans, the album featured artists he had booked for the 1991 Ontario Place concert series World Beat.

At the Juno Awards of 1992, the album won the Juno Award for World Music Album of the Year.

== Track listing ==
No.	Title	Artist	Length
1.	"Bellema"	Mother Tongue	4:28
2.	"Mishomis"	Leland Bell	5:20
3.	"Respect"	Nu Black Nation	5:08
4.	"Arpa Ektim"	Dostler	2:21
5.	"El Brujo"	Ramiro's Latin Orchestra	5:28
6.	"Rock a Talk"	Special Ice	3:49
7.	"Tsoga"	Siyakha	3:38
8.	"Hora Hora Hora"	Flying Bulgar Klezmer Band	5:58
9.	"Father It's Time"	Joseph Maviglia	4:19
10.	"Hoy Viva El Recuerdo"	Banda Brava	8:02
11.	"Mahal Kita"	Dante	4:48
