= Bill Bourne =

Canadian musician (1954–2022)

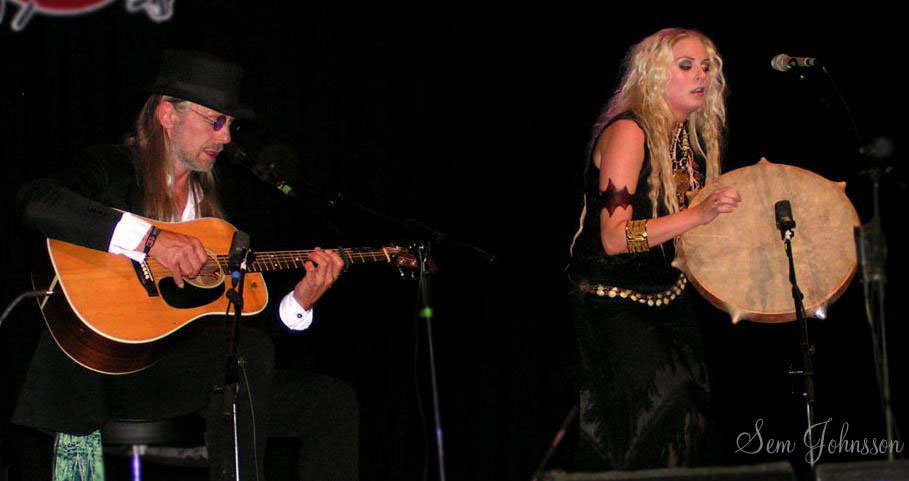
- Bourne with Eivør Pálsdóttir in 2005

Background information
- Born: William Sigurd Bourne; 28 March 1954; Innisfail, Alberta, Canada
- Died: 16 April 2022 (aged 68)
- Genres: Folk, rock, blues
- Occupations: Musician, singer, songwriter
- Instruments: Guitar, fiddle, harmonica, bouzouki, bass pedals
- Years active: 1975–2022
- Labels: Cordova Bay; Linus Entertainment

William Sigurd Bourne (28 March 1954 – 16 April 2022) was a Canadian musician. He won three Canadian Juno Awards, and was an eight-time nominee. Bourne's music incorporates a variety of musical styles, including aboriginal, African, Cajun, Celtic, country, delta blues, flamenco, folk, funk, gospel, reggae, and world beat.

== Early years ==
Bourne was born in Innisfail, Alberta on 28 March 1954 to parents Alfred William Bourne and Helga 'Iris' Bourne, nee Benediktson. He was the third of five children. Alfred and Iris played in a band with Dick Damron at local dances, where Bourne and his siblings would sleep behind the piano. Although interested in pursuing music as a career from an early age, Bourne trained as a mechanic to appease his father.

In 1970, at 16, Bourne ran away to join the burgeoning music scene in Toronto. He played a few times before returning to Alberta after six months.

== Musical career ==
Bourne began performing as a solo act in 1975. By 1978, he was part of a band named Sweetgrass, playing with second cousin Jim Morison and multi-instrumentalist Dave Richards.

He released a self-titled album in 1980, then joined The Tannahill Weavers, a traditional Scottish band he was introduced to by Jim MacLauchlan of Edmonton's Southside Folk Club. He stayed with the Weavers until 1984. After leaving the Weavers, Bourne paired up with Alan MacLeod, another former member. The two won a Juno Award in 1991 for their 1990 album, Dance and Celebrate. Bourne and MacLeod released two more albums. Around this time Bourne was playing periodically with Celtic punk group The Real McKenzies.

Bourne's second Juno came in 1992 courtesy of his contribution to the 1991 musical anthology Saturday Night Blues. He then partnered with Shannon Johnson, later of The McDades, to release two albums; one in 1994 and one in 1996.

In 1997, Bourne joined blues duo Schuld & Stamer on their debut album, No Special Rider. The record garnered a Juno nomination in 1998.

In 2000, Bourne, Madagascar Slim, and Lester Quitzau formed the string trio Tri-Continental. He recorded five albums with them. Their debut album brought a third Juno award.

In 2002, Bourne released the solo album Voodoo King. His collaboration with Faroese singer-songwriter Eivør Pálsdóttir resulted in the album eivør, which won two Danish Music Awards in 2006. Bourne, Jasmine Ohlhauser, and Wyckham Porteous recorded together as the BOP Ensemble. Bourne also performed with flautist Aysha Wills.

In 2011, Bourne fronted the Free Radio Band with his son Pat to record the Bluesland album. Daughter Emily contributed the album's cover art. In 2012, he released two CDs; the solo album Songs from A Gypsy Caravan, and Amoeba Collective, created in collaboration with Tippy Agogo and other musicians. In 2012, Bourne was also performing with Indio Saravanja and Scott Cook as the Tres Hombres.

In 2013, Bourne led the historic Edmonton Christmas album titled An Edmonton Christmas: Live Off the Floor, along with other Edmontonian artists including Joe Nolan, Jenie Thai, Jeremy "Jey" Witten, and Justine Vandergrift. He was a member of The Christmas Carol Project, which staged annual performances of Dickens A Christmas Carol. Bourne played the part of Ebenezer Scrooge.

Bourne was one of the members of Trancescapes, a seven-member group formed by him in or around 2013. In 2015, they issued Gaia Sadhana. All six tracks on the album were entirely improvised, and had Sanskrit titles. In addition to guitar, violin, and percussion, the music features drones, a Tibetan singing bowl, and non-lexical vocables.

Beginning in April 2020 and continuing for several months, Bourne partnered with Paul Steffes to stage a series of pop-up concerts in neighbourhoods around Alberta, and into British Columbia.

In the studio, Bourne often served as producer, arranger, mixer, and engineer when working on his own projects. In addition to performing on the album, he was producer for The Kitchen Boys' 1994 release, Passion Town. He was producer for The Black Pioneer Heritage Singers' live recording in 2008.

== Personal life ==
Bourne's great-grandfather was Icelandic-Canadian poet Stephan G. Stephansson.

In 1979, Bourne married Dorothy Campbell. The couple divorced in 1995. They had two children; Patrick William and Emily Jean.

Bourne was a licensed diesel mechanic. He also held both a Class I license with airbrake endorsement, and a Class VI motorcycle license. His hobbies included fly fishing. He once drove a classic 1968 Lincoln Continental coast-to-coast while on a musical tour.

Bourne earned a reputation as a musical mentor. For a while he gave free guitar lessons to young people through the Boyle Street Community League. Starting in 2018, he was a mentor with the Heart of the City Festival.

Bourne died of cancer on 16 April 2022.

The 2022 Sasquatch Gathering and Music Festival was dedicated to his memory.

== Discography ==
Solo albums

- 1981 Bill Bourne
- 1997 Farmer, Philanthropist & Musician
- 1998 Sally's Dream
- 2002 Voodoo King
- 2007 Boon Tang
- 2009 Between Trains
- 2012 Songs from a Gypsy Caravan
- 2017 Hummingbird
- 2020 A Love Fandango

With The Tannahill Weavers

- 1983 Passage
- 1996 Celtic Folk Festival [Munich]

With Bourne & MacLeod

- 1990 Dance and Celebrate
- 1992 Moonlight Dancers
- 2002 Bootleg

With Shannon Johnson

- 1994 Dear Madonna
- 1996 Victory Train

With Schuld & Stamer

- 1997 No Special Rider

With Tri-Continental

- 2000 Tri-Continental
- 2002 Live
- 2003 Let's Play
- 2004 Drifting
- 2018 Dust Dance

With Eivør Pálsdóttir

- 2004 Eivør

With The Free Radio Band

- 2011 Bluesland

With Tippy Agogo et al.

- 2012 Amoeba Collective

With Trancescapes

- 2015 Gaia Sadhana

Other album Appearances

- 1991 Saturday Night Blues, Vol. 1
- 1997 Edmonton Folk Music Festival Compilation 1
- 2001 Hold your ground : a collection of songs with social significance
- 2003 Songs from the Carol Project
- 2013 An Edmonton Christmas: Live Off The Floor
