= Wesli =

Canadian guitarist

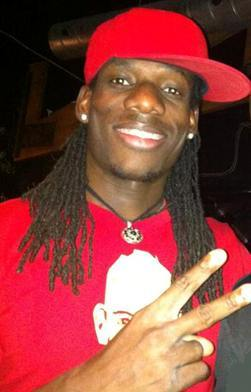

Background information
- Born: Wesley Louissaint; September 6, 1980; Port-au-Prince, Haiti
- Origin: Montreal, Quebec
- Genres: Haitian music
- Occupation: guitarist
- Instruments: vocals, guitar
- Years active: 2000s-present

Wesli is the stage name of Wesley Louissaint, a Haitian Canadian singer-songwriter, guitarist and a record producer. He is most noted for winning the Juno Award for World Music Album of the Year at the Juno Awards of 2019 for his album Rapadou Kreyol.

Born and raised in Port-au-Prince, he moved to Montreal, Quebec, in 2001 to study music. He collaborated on albums by Senaya and Sara Rénélik in the 2000s before releasing his own debut album Kouraj in 2009. He followed up with the albums Liberté dans le noir in 2011, ImmiGrand and Ayiti Étoile Nouvelle in 2015, an expanded edition of ImmiGrand in 2017, and Rapadou Kreyol in 2018.

== Biography ==
=== Origins in Haiti ===
One of seven children, Wesli grew up in Haiti in a poor family. His father was a twoubadou player and musician. Starting at eight years old, his father would invite Wesli to play percussion with him In 1991, following the military coup that put an end to the government of Jean-Bertrand Aristide, Wesli embarked on a "boat-people" with his parents to escape the violence in his country. He spent a year in a refugee camp in Guantanamo Bay and then lived in one of the slums of Port-au-Prince.

=== From the West Indies to France ===
Wesli joined the Afro-roots quartet Jazz4ever with whom he performed in several venues and bars in Haiti. Afterwards, he continued to perform and travel to the West Indies and France with the company Kreyol Mizik. He then joined the soul music group So Kute, with whom he recorded an album, which allowed him to tour Haiti and North America.

=== Quebec ===
==== Beginning of his career (2001–2007) ====
In 2001, Wesli chose Canada as his home and settled in Montreal. As soon as he arrived, he worked closely with the productions team of the Festival International Nuits d'Afrique de Montréal. He shared the stage with African music artists such as Lorraine Klaasen (en), Monique Seka, King Mensah, Amadou Sodia, Sekouba Bambino, Hamid Bouchnak.

In 2003, Wesli met the choreographer of Cirque du Soleil: Debra Brown. Wesli was then hired to tour internationally as a musician and musical director for various multidisciplinary and circus shows.

In 2004, Wesli shared the stage with Wyclef Jean as the guitarist for the group Muzion, opening for him at the Festival d'été de Québec.

- Senaya (Garde la tête haute, 2005) nominated at the Juno Awards in the category "Best Francophone album of the year 2006".
- Sara Rénélik (Aube, 2006) nominated at the Canadian Folk Music Awards (en) in the category "Best World Music Solo Artist" in 2007.

As an independent artist, he created his own record label in 2006 under the name WUP (Wes Urban Productions).

==== Wesli and the Wesli Band ====
In 2007, Wesli surrounded himself with musicians from different countries and formed the Wesli Band in Montreal. Wesli Band is a mix of world music, afrobeat, hip-hop, soul, rara and Haitian roots music.

The Wesli Band is conceived as a committed group. Wesli expresses himself as follows: "With my music, I just want to bring something very useful and constructive to society. That's what music is all about. Mine is very committed and it's inspired by the everyday struggle and my rough experience in Haiti. With his group, Wesli has performed on many festival stages in Canada, including the Montreal International Jazz Festival, the FrancoFolies de Montréal, the Campbell Concerts, Festival d'été de Québec, Afrikadey! in Calgary, the Franco-Fête and the Small World Festival in Toronto, the Folk Music Festival in Vancouver, the Festival du Voyageur in Winnipeg, the Sunfest Festival in London (Ontario), and the Festival musique du bout du monde in Gaspé.

In April 2009, Wesli released his first album entitled Kouraj (a 14-track album, self-produced and produced by Wesli himself), which bears witness to the ongoing misery in Haiti and in several countries in the Caribbean, Africa and elsewhere. The compositions integrate Haitian percussions (Manman tambou, Segon, Kata...), African instruments (Kora, Balafon, Calebasse, Talking Drum...) and guitar and saxophone solos. Kouraj was quite successful and took the group on tour across Canada and Haiti10. With this first album, Wesli has opened for some of the biggest names in the music scene, including Magic System (2009)11 and Tiken Jah Fakoly (2011)12 at the Olympia and Alpha Blondy at the Metropolis (2011).

In 2010, Wesli won the Babel Med Music Award14 in Marseille, France. In 2011, the group showcased in New York at the APAP (Global Performing Arts Marketplace and Conference) as well as in Montreal as part of the Mundial Montreal World Music Conference.

At the end of 2011, Wesli released his second album entitled Liberté dans le noir (17 tracks; self-produced and produced by Wesli himself) to which Mes Aïeux, Radio Radio, Paul Cargnello, Boogat, Karma Atchykah and Tiken Jah Fakoly collaborated.

Wesli performs with different formations ranging from Wesli solo in acoustic version, duo, trio or up to eight musicians on stage (Wesli Band). Wesli and his musicians have been invited to appear on television and radio shows. They have appeared on Belle et Bum, Des kiwis et des hommes10, Les Lionnes17, Pour un soir seulement18, Studio 12, among others. Wesli has been interviewed several times by CBC Radio19, Radio-Canada20 and Radio-Canada International21, Espace Musique22, CIBL-FM23.

== Discography ==
- Kouraj (2009)
- Liberté dans le noir (2011)
- ImmiGrand (2015)
- Ayiti Étoile Nouvelle (2015)
- ImmiGrand Deluxe (2017)
- Rapadou Kreyol (2018)
- Tradisyon (2022)
