= Tri-Continental =

Canadian musical group

Tri-Continental is a Canadian blues, folk, and world music group consisting of musicians Bill Bourne, Lester Quitzau, and Madagascar Slim. They are most noted for winning the Juno Award for Roots & Traditional Album of the Year – Group at the Juno Awards of 2001, for their self-titled debut album.

Formed in the late 1990s for a festival tour blending folk and African music, they released their debut album in 2000. Bourne played acoustic guitar and fiddle, Quitzau played slide, electric, and acoustic guitar, and Madagascar Slim played guitar and valiha.

Between 2002 and 2018, Tri-Continental recorded four more albums. Their most recent, Dust Dance, was released in 2018, and featured contributions from percussionist Michael Treadway. The album received a 2020 Canadian Folk Music Award nomination in the category Pushing the Boundaries at the 15th Canadian Folk Music Awards and 2019 Album of the Year nomination at the International Folk Alliance Awards.

Bill Bourne died of cancer on 16 April 2022.

== Discography ==
- 2000 - Tri-Continental
- 2002 - Live
- 2003 - Let's Play
- 2004 - Drifting
- 2018 - Dust Dance
