= Valley (band) =

Canadian indie pop band

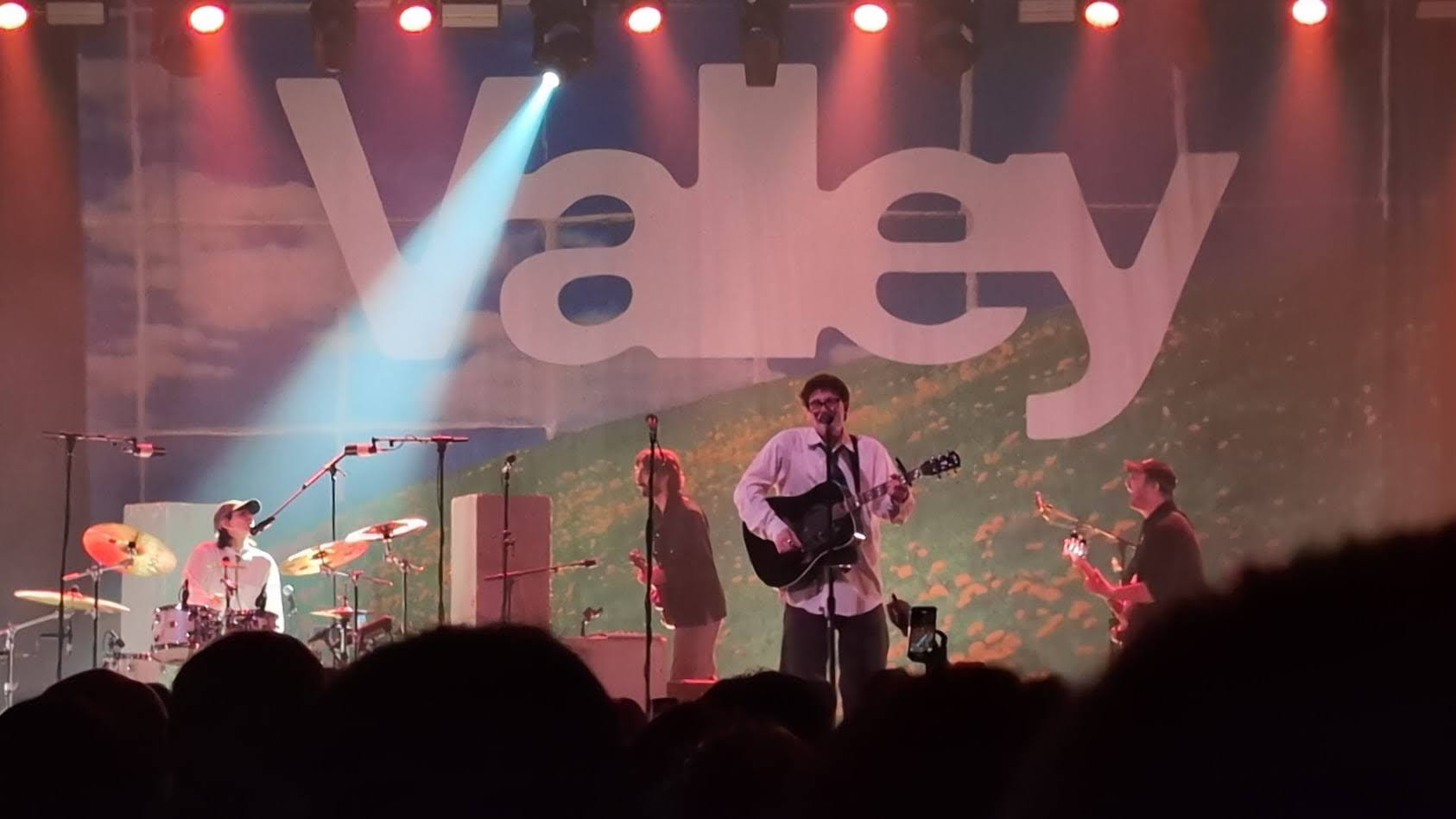
- Valley performing at History in Toronto in December 2024. Left to right: Karah James, Feurd, Rob Laska, Alex Dimauro

Background information
- Origin: Toronto, Ontario, Canada
- Genres: Alternative pop; indie pop; pop rock
- Years active: 2014–present
- Labels: Universal Music Canada; Capitol
- Members: Rob Laska; Alex Dimauro; Karah James
- Past members: Ben Lee; Michael "Mickey" Brandolino
- Website: www.thisisvalley.com

Valley is a Canadian alternative pop band based in Toronto.

The band members are lead vocalist Rob Laska, bassist Alex Dimauro, and drummer Karah James. They received a Juno Award nomination for Breakthrough Group of the Year at the 2020 Juno Awards as well as a nomination for Group of the Year at the Juno Awards of 2022.

== History ==
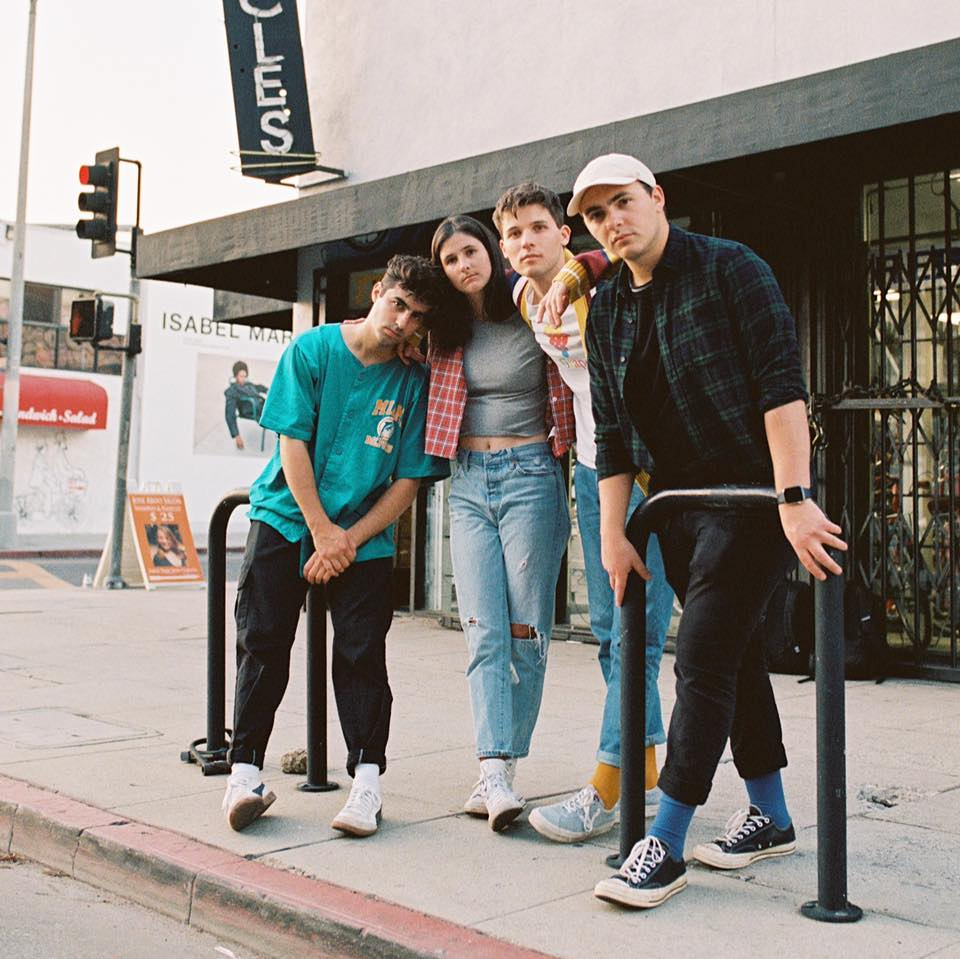
Valley on tour in 2019. Left to right: Michael Brandolino, Karah James, Rob Laska, Alex Dimauro

The band formed in 2014 after the members of two other bands accidentally got double-booked for the same time slot at a local recording studio. Other names considered were Thieves, The Engineers, and Grouphug. They released their debut EP, Car Test, in 2015, and followed up with This Room Is White in 2016. In 2018, they released Maybe Side A, the first of two EPs featuring tracks planned for their full-length debut album; the second EP, Maybe Side B, followed in spring 2019, and the full album Maybe was released in September.

Valley released their single "Nevermind" in July 2020, which was then followed by "Hiccup" in September. On October 15, Valley announced the release of their EP, Sucks to See You Doing Better, which featured both "Nevermind" and "Hiccup", as well as four new tracks, including an acoustic version of "Hiccup".

In February 2021, Valley released their single "Like 1999" and announced they would tour with Coin in over 30 cities across North America, beginning in October.

Midway through 2021, they released the single "Society", which the band says came from their previous experiences of balancing an accessible narrative with their artistic pursuits. On July 23, 2021, they released the single "Tempo".

The single "Homebody" was a nominee for the 2021 SOCAN Songwriting Prize. "Oh Shit...Are We in Love?" was released on September 1, 2021.

In March 2024, lead guitarist Brandolino announced he was parting ways with the band. He stated it was due to wanting to pursue music production full-time. Later that year, the band released Water the Flowers, Pray for a Garden on August 30, 2024. The album was their first album as a trio and was produced by Chase Lawrence from the band COIN. The album was nominated for the 2025 Juno in the category of Alternative Album of the Year.

== Band members ==
Current

- Rob Laska – lead vocals, guitar (2014–present)
- Alex Dimauro – bass, keyboard, backing vocals (2014–present)
- Karah James – drums, guitar, backing and lead vocals (2014–present)

Former

- Ben Lee – keyboards, backing vocals (2014–2016)
- Michael "Mickey" Brandolino – guitar, drums, keyboard, piano, backing vocals (2014–2024)

Touring

- Feurd – guitar, drums, keyboard, piano, backing vocals (2024–present)

== Discography ==
=== Albums ===
List of albums
Title	Release date	Label
Maybe	September 17, 2019	Universal Music Canada
Last Birthday	October 1, 2021	Capitol
Lost in Translation	June 23, 2023	Universal Music Canada
Water the Flowers, Pray for a Garden	August 30, 2024	Universal Music Canada

=== Extended plays ===
List of extended plays
Title	Release date	Label
Car Test	April 22, 2015	
This Room Is White	June 3, 2016	
Sucks to See You Doing Better	October 23, 2020	Universal Music Canada
Last Birthday	January 12, 2022	Universal Music Canada

=== Singles ===
List of singles
Title	Release date	Album
"Drive"	November 18, 2016	Non-album singles
"Swim (Reprise)"	March 9, 2018	Non-album singles
"LA in Two" (Valley Rework) (with Elio)	March 19, 2021	ELIO and Friends: The Remixes
"Like 1999"	March 30, 2021	Last Birthday
"Society"	June 9, 2021	Last Birthday
"Tempo"	July 21, 2021	Last Birthday
"Champagne"	June 16, 2022	Non-album singles
"The Problem Song"	September 29, 2022	Non-album singles
"Throwback Tears"	January 12, 2023	Lost In Translation
"Good, but Not Together"	March 2, 2023	Lost In Translation
"Break for You"	April 24, 2023	Lost In Translation
"Have a Good Summer (Without Me)"	June 1, 2023	Lost In Translation
"We Don't Need Malibu"	June 21, 2023	Lost In Translation
"Keep My Stuff"	June 23, 2023	Lost In Translation
"When You Know Someone"	May 10, 2024	Water the Flowers, Pray for a Garden
"Water the Flowers, Pray for a Garden"	June 7, 2024	Water the Flowers, Pray for a Garden
"Bass Player's Brother"	July 11, 2024	Water the Flowers, Pray for a Garden
"Let it Rain"	August 22, 2024	Water the Flowers, Pray for a Garden
"Crawlspace"	August 30, 2024	Water the Flowers, Pray for a Garden
"Vending Machine"	June 12, 2026	TBA

== Awards and nominations ==
=== Juno Awards ===
The Juno Awards, more popularly known as the JUNOS, are awards presented annually to Canadian musical artists and bands to acknowledge their artistic and technical achievements in all aspects of music.

Year	Nominee / work	Award	Result
2020	Themselves	Breakthrough Group of the Year	Nominated
2022	Themselves	Group of the Year	Nominated
2024	"Lost in Translation"	Pop Album of the Year	Nominated
2025	"Water the Flowers, Pray for a Garden"	Alternative Album of the Year	Nominated

=== SOCAN Songwriting Prize ===
The SOCAN Songwriting Prize, formerly known as the ECHO Songwriting Prize, is an annual competition recognizing the best in Canadian emerging music, both anglophone and francophone.

Year	Nominee / work	Award	Result
2021	"homebody"	Song of the Year	Nominated
