= Juno Awards of 2020 =

Canadian music awards ceremony

- The 2020 Juno Awards Logo
- Date: 29 June 2020
- Hosted by: Odario Williams; Damhnait Doyle
- Website: https://junoawards.ca/

Television/radio coverage
- Network: CBC Gem

The Juno Awards of 2020, the 49th Juno Awards, was an awards presentation that was to be held at SaskTel Centre in Saskatoon, Saskatchewan on 15 March 2020. The awards and associated events were cancelled due to the emergence of the COVID-19 pandemic in Canada, making it the first Juno Awards since 1988 to be cancelled. The award winners were announced on 29 June 2020 in an online event.

== Host city bids ==
Saskatoon attempted to host the 2019 awards, but abandoned that bid due to lack of funding. The city's subsequent bid for 2020 was successful. The municipal government of Saskatoon had allocated $350,000 towards the event.

Hamilton, Ontario was previously interested in bidding for the 2019 or 2020 Junos.

== Impact of the COVID-19 pandemic and cancellation ==
On 12 March 2020, three days before the presentation, the Canadian Academy of Recording Arts and Sciences (CARAS) announced that the ceremony and all ancillary events had been cancelled due to health concerns surrounding the coronavirus, as it had been declared a pandemic by World Health Organization the day before. Although Saskatchewan had, until shortly after the cancellation (when its chief medical officer announced the first presumptive case in the province), not had any confirmed cases of coronavirus yet, an announcement on Wednesday that the show would go on had faced backlash from residents and others. CARAS stated that it would "coordinate an alternate plan" to honour its 2020 award recipients.

The Junos Songwriters' Circle, an annual event normally held as part of the Juno Awards weekend which features Canadian songwriters performing and sharing the stories behind their songs in a panel format, was relaunched in May 2020 in a web series format, with the first episode featuring Brett Kissel, Dominique Fils-Aimé, Kaia Kater and Devon Portielje. The second episode featured Rose Cousins, William Prince, Ed Robertson and Tenille Townes; the third featured Dallas Green, Sarah Harmer, Joel Plaskett and Buffy Sainte-Marie; and the fourth featured Scott Helman, Meghan Patrick, Tom Wilson and Whitehorse.

=== Online ceremonies ===
On 18 June, the Junos announced that a virtual ceremony would be broadcast through CBC Gem on 29 June 2020.

== Events ==
Alessia Cara was the planned host of the main ceremonies. The livestream was hosted by Odario Williams and Damhnait Doyle.

== Performers ==
The following performers appeared during the livestream:

- iskwē
- Neon Dreams
- Alessia Cara
- The Dead South

== Nominees and winners ==
Jann Arden was set to be inducted into the Canadian Music Hall of Fame during the main ceremonies. As the ceremony was cancelled, her formal induction instead took place at the Juno Awards of 2021.

Nominations were announced on 18 January 2020. Winners were announced on 29 June.

=== People ===
| Artist of the Year | Group of the Year |
|---|---|
| Shawn Mendes; Bryan Adams; Alessia Cara; Tory Lanez; Jessie Reyez | Loud Luxury; 88Glam; Elijah Woods x Jamie Fine; The Reklaws; Walk Off the Earth |
| Breakthrough Artist of the Year | Breakthrough Group of the Year |
| Lennon Stella; bbno$; Ali Gatie; Alexandra Stréliski; Tenille Townes | Neon Dreams; The Blue Stones; Hunter Brothers; Palaye Royale; Valley |
| Fan Choice Award | Songwriter of the Year |
| Avril Lavigne; bbno$; Justin Bieber; Alessia Cara; Ali Gatie; Tory Lanez; Loud Luxury; Shawn Mendes; Nav; The Weeknd | Alessia Cara - "Growing Pains", "Out of Love", "Rooting for You"; Tim Baker - "All Hands", "Dance", "The Eighteenth Hole"; Bülow - "Boys Will Be Boys", "Sweet Little Lies", "Two Punks in Love"; Tenille Townes - "I Kept the Roses", "Jersey on the Wall (I'm Just Asking)", "White Horse"; Patrick Watson - "Broken", "Dream for Dreaming", "Here Comes the River" |
| Producer of the Year | Recording Engineer of the Year |
| Ben Kaplan - "Brittle Bones Nicky" (Rare Americans), "It's Alright" (Mother Mother); Steve Bays - "Record Shop" (Said the Whale), "Song in My Head" (We Are the City); Derek Hoffman - "Fear of the Flame" (Logan Staats), "Hide Your Love" (Caveboy); Jon Levine - "October", "Rooting for You" (Alessia Cara); Michael Wise - "Just Friends" (Virginia to Vegas), "Sweet Little Lies" (Bülow) | John "Beetle" Bailey - "Dividido" (Alex Cuba feat. Silvana Estrada), "Shotgun" (Monkey House); Jason Dufour - "Push for Yellow", "There's Still a Light in the House" (Valley); Vic Florencia - "Midnight", "Over Me" (Brooke Palsson); George Seara - "If I Can't Have You" (Shawn Mendes), "Incredible" (James TW); Ryan Worsley - "2 Myself" (Ludic), "Known Better" (Nuela Charles) |

=== Albums ===
| Album of the Year | Adult Alternative Album of the Year |
|---|---|
| Alessia Cara, The Pains of Growing; Bryan Adams, Shine a Light; Michael Bublé, Love; Nav, Bad Habits; Alexandra Stréliski, Inscape | Half Moon Run, A Blemish in the Great Light; City and Colour, A Pill for Loneliness; Leonard Cohen, Thanks for the Dance; iskwē, acākosīk; Patrick Watson, Wave |
| Adult Contemporary Album of the Year | Alternative Album of the Year |
| Bryan Adams, Shine a Light; Nuela Charles, Melt; Marc Jordan, Both Sides; Renée Lamoureux, Empower; Lauren Spencer-Smith, Unplugged Vol. 1 | PUP, Morbid Stuff; Black Mountain, Destroyer; Foxwarren, Foxwarren; Mac DeMarco, Here Comes the Cowboy; Orville Peck, Pony |
| Blues Album of the Year | Children's Album of the Year |
| Dawn Tyler Watson, Mad Love; Michael Jerome Browne, That's Where It's At; Durham County Poets, Hand Me Down Blues; Big Dave McLean, Pocket Full of Nothin'; Whitehorse, The Northern South, Vol. 2 | Big Block SingSong, Greatest Hits, Vol. 4; GFORCE, It's GFORCE; Girl Pow-R, This Is Us; Diana Panton, A Cheerful Little Earful; Sharon & Bram, Sharon, Bram & Friends |
| Classical Album of the Year – Solo or Chamber Ensemble | Classical Album of the Year – Large Ensemble or Soloist(s) with Large Ensemble Accompaniment |
| Angela Schwarzkopf, Detach; James Ehnes, Beethoven: Violin Sonatas Op. 12; Ensemble Paramirabo, Alone & Unalone; Quatuor Molinari, John Zorn: Cat o' Nine Tails, The Dead Man, Memento Mori & Kol Nidre; Marina Thibault and Marie-Ève Scarfone, Elles | Montreal Symphony Orchestra conducted by Kent Nagano, The John Adams Album; National Arts Centre Orchestra conducted by Alexander Shelley, The Bound of our Dreams; Jan Lisiecki with Academy of St. Martin in the Fields, Beethoven: Complete Piano Concertos; Orchestre Métropolitain de Montreal conducted by Yannick Nezet-Seguin, Sibelius 1; Montreal Symphony Orchestra conducted by Kent Nagano feat. Charles Richard-Hamelin, Chopin: Concertos Nos. 1 & 2 |
| Classical Album of the Year – Vocal or Choral Performance | Contemporary Christian/Gospel Album of the Year |
| Ottawa Bach Choir conducted by Lisette Canton, Handel: Dixit Dominus; Bach & Schutz: Motets; Chor Leoni Men’s Choir, When There is Peace: An Armistice Oratorio; Gerald Finley, Schubert: Schwanengesang; Brahms: Vier ernste Gesange; Peter Barrett, Martha Guth, Allyson McHardy and Helen Becque, Summer Night; Philippe Sly with Le Chimera Project, Schubert: Winterreise | Matt Maher, The Advent of Christmas; Dan Bremnes, Wherever I Go; Brian Doerksen, The Heart of Christmas; Fresh I.E., Ill Street Blues; Brooke Nicholls, Pursue |
| Country Album of the Year | Electronic Album of the Year |
| Meghan Patrick, Wild As Me; Dean Brody, Black Sheep; Aaron Goodvin, V; Hunter Brothers, State of Mind; Dallas Smith, The Fall | Rezz, Beyond the Senses; Bob Moses, Battle Lines; Electric Youth, Memory Emotion; Jacques Greene, Dawn Chorus; Keys N Krates, A Beat Tape for Your Friends |
| Francophone Album of the Year | Indigenous Music Album of the Year |
| Les Louanges, La nuit est une panthère; Koriass, La nuit des longs couteaux; Jean Leloup, L'Étrange pays; Loud, Tout ça pour ça; Fred Pellerin, Après | Celeigh Cardinal, Stories from a Downtown Apartment; Digawolf, Yellowstone; nêhiyawak, Nipiy; Northern Haze, Siqinnaarut; Riit, ataataga |
| Instrumental Album of the Year | International Album of the Year |
| Alexandra Stréliski, Inscape; Kevin Hearn, Calm and Cents; Bill McBirnie and Bernie Senesky, The Silent Wish; Ron Davis' Symphronica, Symphronica Upfront; Tanya Tagaq, Toothsayer | Billie Eilish, When We All Fall Asleep, Where Do We Go?; Ariana Grande, Thank U, Next; Khalid, Free Spirit; Post Malone, Hollywood's Bleeding; Ed Sheeran, No.6 Collaborations Project |
| Jazz Album of the Year – Solo | Jazz Album of the Year – Group |
| Jacques Kuba Séguin, Migrations; The Mark Kelso Jazz Project, The Chronicles of Fezziwig; Joel Miller, Unstoppable; Ted Quinlan, Absolutely Dreaming; John Stetch, Black Sea Suite | Ernesto Cervini's Turboprop, Abundance; Al Muirhead's Canadian Quintet, Undertones; Brad Turner Quartet, Jump Up; Dave Young Trio, Trouble in Mind; Jane Bunnett and Maqueque, On Firm Ground / Tierra firme |
| Vocal Jazz Album of the Year | Metal/Hard Music Album of the Year |
| Dominique Fils-Aimé, Stay Tuned!; Jazz Affair, Wishes; Monkey House, Friday; Elizabeth Shepherd, Montreal; Bria Skonberg, Nothing Never Happens | Striker, Play to Win; The Agonist, Orphans; Kobra and the Lotus, Evolution; Lindsay Schoolcraft, Martyr; Single Mothers, Through a Wall |
| Pop Album of the Year | Rock Album of the Year |
| Alessia Cara, The Pains of Growing; Bülow, Crystalline; Elijah Woods x Jamie Fine, 8:47; Avril Lavigne, Head Above Water; Walk Off the Earth, Here We Go! | The Glorious Sons, A War on Everything; Big Wreck, ..but for the sun; The Dirty Nil, Master Volume; Headstones, Peopleskills; Sum 41, Order in Decline |
| Contemporary Roots Album of the Year | Traditional Roots Album of the Year |
| Lee Harvey Osmond, Mohawk; Del Barber, Easy Keeper; Irish Mythen, Little Bones; Catherine MacLellan, Coyote; Justin Rutledge, Passages | The Dead South, Sugar & Joy; Natalie MacMaster, Sketches; Miranda Mulholland, By Appointment or Chance; The Small Glories, Assiniboine and the Red; April Verch, Once a Day |
| World Music Album of the Year | Comedy Album of the Year |
| Djely Tapa, Barokan; Romina Di Gasbarro, Risorgimento; Okan, Sombras; Okavango African Orchestra, Africa Without Borders; Silla + Rise, Galactic Gala | Sophie Buddle, Lil Bit of Buddle; Jarrett Campbell, Straight White Fail; Adam Christie, General Anxiety Disorder; Monty Scott, The Abyss Stares Back; Steph Tolev, I'm Not Well |

=== Songs and recordings ===
| Single of the Year | Classical Composition of the Year |
|---|---|
| Shawn Mendes and Camila Cabello, "Señorita"; Bülow, "Sweet Little Lies"; Alessia Cara, "Out of Love"; Scott Helman, "Hang Ups"; Lennon Stella, "La Di Da" | Ana Sokolovic, "Evta"; Rose Bolton, "The Coming of Sobs"; Vincent Ho, "Kickin' It 2.0"; Jared Miller, "Under Sea, Above Sky"; Bekah Simms, "Everything Is...Distorted" |
| Dance Recording of the Year | R&B/Soul Recording of the Year |
| Felix Cartal and Lights, "Love Me"; Loud Luxury and Bryce Vine, "I'm Not Alright"; Ralph, "Gravity"; Sultan & Shepard feat. Showtek, "We Found Love"; Frank Walker feat. Astrid S, "Only When It Rains" | Jessie Reyez, Tory Lanez and Tainy, "Feel It Too"; Amaal, "Black Dove"; Daniel Caesar, "Case Study 01"; Tanika Charles, "The Gumption"; Tory Lanez, Chixtape 5 |
| Rap Recording of the Year | Reggae Recording of the Year |
| Tory Lanez, Freaky; 88Glam, 88GLAM2; Classified, Tomorrow Could Be the Day Things Change; Killy, Light Path 8; Nav, Bad Habits | Lyndon John X, The Warning Track; Jay Douglas, "Jah Children"; Exco Levi, "Wah Gwaan"; Petraa, "Never Broken"; Storry, "Another Man" |

=== Other ===
| Album Artwork of the Year | Video of the Year |
|---|---|
| Chad Moldenhauer (art director), Ian Clarke (designer), Warren Clark and Lance Inkwell (illustrators) - Kristofer Maddigan, Selections from Cuphead; Kevin Hearn (art director), Antoine Moonen (designer), Lauchie Reed and Harland Williams (illustrators) - Kevin Hearn and Friends, The Superhero Suite; Kris Knight (art director & designer), Jason Sniderman (art director), James Mejia (designer), Chris Peters (illustrator), Stefanie Schneider (photographer) - Ensign Broderick, Bloodcrush/Bloodmyth; Sean Brown and Keavan Yazdani (art directors) - Daniel Caesar, Case Study 01; Terri Fidelak (art director, designer, & illustrator), Carey Shaw (photographer) - Belle Plaine, Malice, Mercy, Grief & Wrath | Sarah Legault - "Little Star" (iskwē); Caraz - "Bun Dem" (Sarahmée); Johnny Jansen - "Record Shop" (Said the Whale); Le GED - "Back Off" (Laurence Nerbonne); Jonathan Robert - "Topographe" (Corridor) |
