= African Guitar Summit =

Canadian musical group (2004–2017)

- Origin: Toronto, Ontario, Canada
- Years active: 2004-2017
- Label: CBC Records
- Members: Alpha Yaya Diallo; Naby Camara; Pa Joe; Theo Yaw Boakye; Kofi Ackah; Adam Solomon; Mighty Popo; Donné Roberts; Madagascar Slim
- Website: African Guitar Summit on myspace

African Guitar Summit is a group of nine Canadian musicians, all of African origin, who perform traditional songs from their native countries.

== History ==
The African Guitar Summit was organized in Toronto as part of a performance project for CBC Radio's On Stage program. Musicians were, from Guinea, guitarist Alpha Yaya Diallo and on balafon Naby Camara. From Ghana, guitarist Pa Joe, singer Theo Yaw Boakye, and drummer Kofi Ackah took part. Additional musicians were Adam Solomon from Kenya, Mighty Popo from Burundi/Rwanda, and from Madagascar guitarist and harmony singer Donné Roberts and Madagascar Slim. The producer of African Guitar Summit was Todd Fraracci.

The nine musicians rehearsed and arranged for three days, sharing stories and experiences. On the fourth day the group debuted in a concert at CBC's Glenn Gould Studio. The following three days were spent in CBC Studio 211 recording their self-titled CD. Everything was recorded live off the floor, in one or two takes.

African Guitar Summit was released on CBC Records in November 2004, and went on to win the Juno Award for World Music Album of the Year. The group performed an arrangement of Mwembo at the Juno Awards Gala in Winnipeg, April 2, 2005 and, in the same year, at the Live 8 concert in Barrie, near Toronto.

Their second album, African Guitar Summit II was released in 2006 and nominated as World Music Album of the Year at the Juno Awards of 2007.

In 2016 and 2017, under the management of the Herschel Freeman Agency, the group toured the US.

== Discography ==
- African Guitar Summit (Vol 1 CD) (November 2, 2004)
- African Guitar Summit (Vol 2 CD) (September 26, 2006)
