= Eccodek =

Canadian musical group

- Origin: Guelph, Ontario, Canada
- Genres: electronic music, world music
- Members: Andrew McPherson

Eccodek is a Canadian musical group based in Guelph, Ontario, known for their fusion of world music and electronic music styles. The band is composed of core member Andrew McPherson and a rotating collective of musicians who collaborate on the band's releases. They have twice been nominated for the Juno Award for World Music Album of the Year.

== History ==
McPherson formed the band in the late 1990s as a side project to his work as a session musician and producer for artists including Jane Siberry, Natalie MacMaster, and GusGus.

The band released their debut album, Faux Jazz, in 1999, and a second album, More Africa in Us in 2003. Kiran Ahluwalia contributed to the band's 2005 album, Voices Have Eyes.

Eccodek signed to White Swan World, a subsidiary of Rykodisc, in 2006. Their next album, Shivaboom, was nominated as Best World Music Album at the Juno Awards of 2009.

Eccodek's album Singing in Tongues, featuring Onkar Singh, drummer Adam Bowman, and singer Jah Youssouf, was also nominated as Best World Music Album at the Juno Awards of 2015.

== Discography ==
- Faux Jazz (1999)
- More Africa in Us (2003)
- Voices Have Eyes (2005)
- Shivaboom (2008)
- Remixtasy (2011)
- Living for Live (2012)
- Singing in Tongues (2014)
- Remixing in Tongues (2015)
