= Adham Shaikh =

Canadian musician

Adham Shaikh is a composer, record producer, and sound designer living near Nelson, British Columbia.

Shaikh's interest in music began by exploring synthesizers in the early 1980s. In the early 1990s, he found the electronic-music scene full of innovative and explorative sounds. This environment created an opportunity for him to present his compositions to an audience that was already embracing electronic music. Shaikh furthered his electro-acoustic composition education at Queen's University and has continued making music, resulting in a diverse discography.

Shaikh's music is a blend of many different styles and techniques. It is a world-groove blend of fusion, dub, world beat, tech house, ambient, and jazz. From growing up listening to Indian ragas and Western classical music, he developed an ear for a fusion of sounds from around the world. This musical blend of styles and traditions inspire his compositions. The 21st-century rituals of dance and chill-out have drawn Shaikh to explore the trance phenomenon that these different expressions of music create and allow.

Over the years, Shaikh has worked with musicians playing musical instruments from India; Bali; Indonesia; Africa; Scandinavia; Turkey; the United States; and Canada. Shaikh was nominated for a 2006 Juno award in the category of World Music Album of the Year.

A remix of Shaikh's song "Water Prayer" was used as the soundtrack of the season-two finale of the Canadian television series Orphan Black.
