= Gypsy Kumbia Orchestra =

Canadian World Music Group

Gypsy Kumbia Orchestra are a Canadian world music group, whose music blends Latin American cumbia, Balkan music and gypsy jazz influences. They are most noted as two-time Juno Award nominees for World Music Album of the Year, receiving nods at the Juno Awards of 2016 for their album Revuelta Danza Party and at the Juno Awards of 2021 for VelkomBak.

Based in Montreal, Quebec, the band is led by Sebastian Mejia, a Colombian immigrant to Canada. A tour by the band of Colombia is portrayed in the 2019 documentary film Fait vivir.
