= The Living Road =

Studio album by Lhasa de Sela
- Released: 2003
- Label: Audiogram

Lhasa de Sela chronology
La Llorona (1997)	The Living Road (2003)	Lhasa (2009)

Professional ratings
Review scores
Source	Rating
Allmusic	link

The Living Road is the second album by Mexican-American singer Lhasa de Sela, released in 2003. The album was shortlisted for the Juno Award for World Music Album of the Year at the Juno Awards of 2004. The album was certified gold in Canada for sales higher than 50,000 copies

== Track listing ==
1. "Con toda palabra" (With All Words)
2. "La marée haute" (The High Tide)
3. "Anywhere on This Road"
4. "Abro la ventana" (I Open the Window)
5. "J'arrive à la ville" (I Come to the City)
6. "La frontera" (The Border)
7. "La confession" (The Confession)
8. "Small Song"
9. "My Name"
10. "Pa' Llegar a tu lado" (To Reach Your Side)
11. "Para el Fin del mundo o el Año Nuevo" (For the End of the World or the New Year)
12. "Soon This Space Will Be too Small"
