= The Message (Alpha Yaya Diallo album) =

Studio album by Alpha Yaya Diallo
- Released: 1998
- Label: Wicklow
- Producer: Kevin Finseth

Alpha Yaya Diallo chronology
| Futur (1996) | The Message (1998) | The Journey (2001) |

The Message is an album by the Guinean-born Canadian musician Alpha Yaya Diallo. It was independently released in Canada in 1998, with an international release in 1999. The Message won a Juno Award for "Best Global Album". Diallo supported the album with a Canadian tour.

== Production ==
Produced by Kevin Finseth, the album was written and recorded in Vancouver, Canada. Diallo sang in Fula, Susu, Maninka, and French. His guitar playing was influenced by George Benson and Mark Knopfler. "Kakande" is an instrumental.

== Critical reception ==
Professional ratings
Review scores
| Source | Rating |
|---|---|
| AllMusic | 4.5/5 stars |
| Robert Christgau | A− |
| The Gazette | 8.5/10 |
| MusicHound World: The Essential Album Guide | 4.5/5 stars |

The Austin Chronicle wrote that "Diallo's vox isn't quite as distinct as that of Baaba Maal or Youssou N'Dour, but that permits Diallo ... to do something those West African international superstars can't: serve up potent harmony vocals as in the blistering, syncopated Latin rhythm of 'Amour'." Robert Christgau opined that "somehow this Guinéean guitarist-vocalist parses the link between pan-African beatsmanship and world-music eternal return."

Newsday noted that "Diallo's lyrics articulate his bittersweet yearning for the tattered ties and scuffed dignity of his embattled homeland." The Ottawa Citizen called the album "an energetic fusion of the traditional Manding and Foulah guitar rhythms with modern funk and jazz." The Gazette praised Diallo's "increasingly refined songwriting, singing, guitar playing and percussion." The Cape Cod Times listed The Message as the fifth best CD of 1999.

AllMusic deemed Diallo "a master musician, playing guitar, bass, and percussion as he leads his razor-sharp ensemble through an exhilarating nine-song set."

== Track listing ==
| No. | Title | Length |
|---|---|---|
| 1. | "Fissiriwaly" |
| 2. | "Badenma" |
| 3. | "Faybhe" |
| 4. | "Kakande" |
| 5. | "Duniya" |
| 6. | "Africa" |
| 7. | "Amour" |
| 8. | "Fatumata Diallo" |
| 9. | "Vancouver Venez Voir" |
