= Fait vivir =

2020 documentary film

- Promotional release poster
- Directed by: Óscar Ruiz Navia
- Written by: Óscar Ruiz Navia; Juan Sebastián Mejía
- Produced by: Carmen Ruiz; Natalia Rendón; Ana María Ruiz; William Vega
- Starring: Manuk Aukan Mejía; Carmen Ruiz Navia; Juan Sebastián Mejía; Anina Mejía
- Music by: Gypsy Kumbia Orchestra
- Production companies: Contravía Films; Telepacífico
- Release dates: September 2019 (Biarritz); 14 August 2020
- Running time: 76 minutes
- Countries: Colombia; Canada
- Language: Spanish

Fait vivir is a 2019 Colombian-Canadian documentary film co-produced between Colombia and Canada, directed and written by Oscar Ruiz Navia and released internationally on August 14, 2020. The film participated in events such as Bogotá International Film Festival, Biarritz Latin American Film Festival, Cali International Film Festival, Transcinema International Film Festival in Peru, Bogotá International Documentary Festival and UNAM International Film Festival in Mexico, among others.

== Synopsis ==
A governor appears in a remote tropical town in Colombia and prohibits all forms of artistic expression such as dancing and singing. This is how Makondo was born, a work created by the Gypsy Kumbia Orchestra that brings together musicians and artists from all over the world. Manuk, a five-year-old boy, tells the story of the adventures of this picturesque group and their journey through towns and villages in Colombia plagued by armed conflict.

== Cast ==
- Manuk Aukan Mejía
- Carmen Ruiz Navia
- Juan Sebastián Mejía
- Anina Mejía

== Reception ==
Rodrigo Torrijos of Rolling Stone Colombia gave it a score of three and a half stars out of a possible five, stating that Fait Vivir "uses the poetry that inhabits reality and makes it dance with its doses of fantasy, looks beyond the limits of the documentary genre and creates a journey full of positivism in which it is easy to get lost".
