= Ayrad =

Canadian world music group

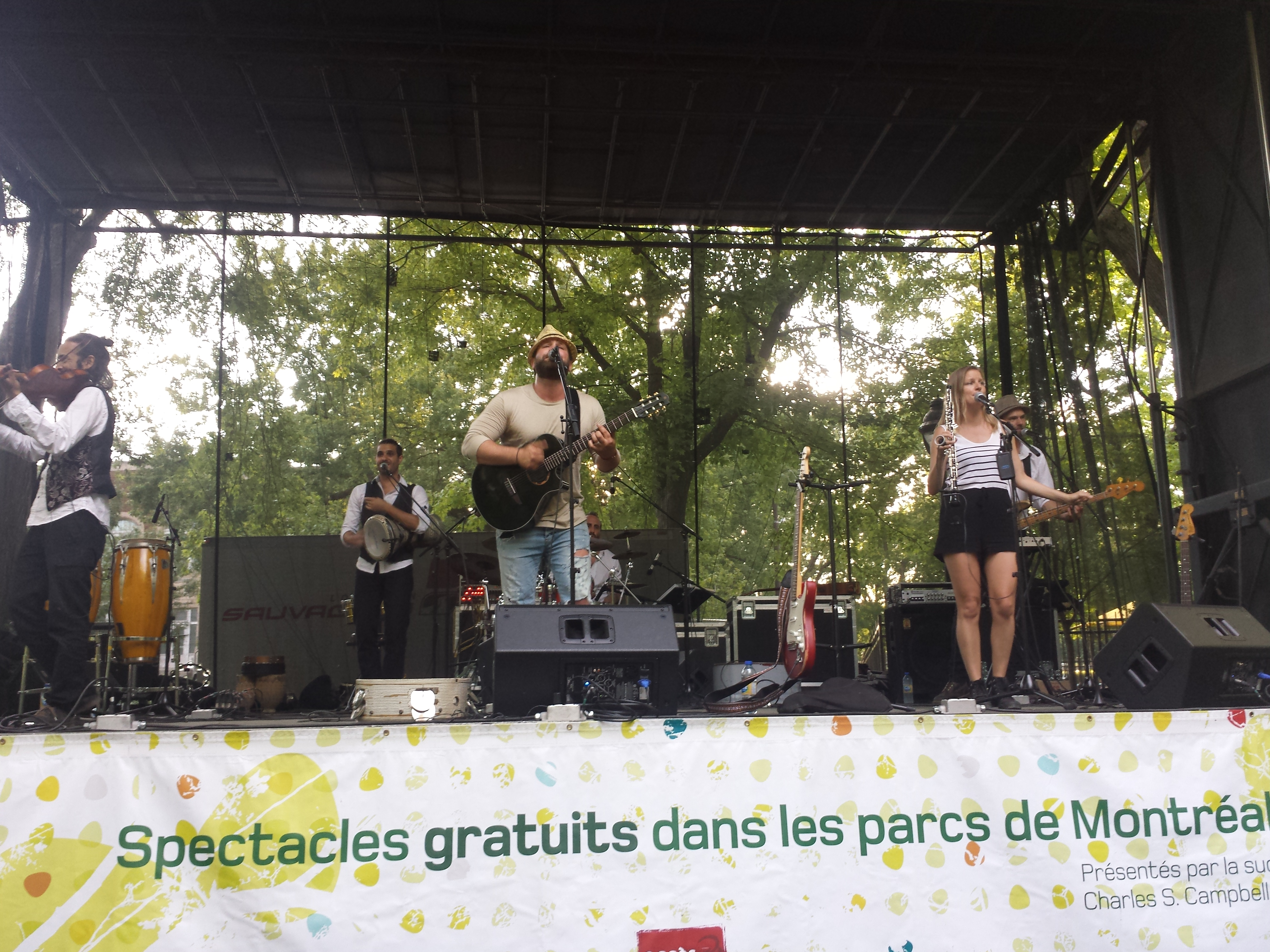

Background information
- Origin: Montreal, Quebec, Canada
- Genres: world music, Moroccan music
- Years active: 2008–present
- Labels: COOP Les Faux-Monnayeurs
- Members: Hamza Abouabdelmajid; Annick Beauvais; Gabriel Brochu-Lajoie; Anit Ghosh; Kattam Laraki-Côté; Sylvain Plante
- Website: https://ayradband.com

Ayrad (pronounced “hi-e-rad”) is a Canadian world music group from Montreal, who play a modern spin on traditional Moroccan music. Led by vocalist Hamza Abouabdelmajid, band members include Annick Beauvais on oboe, bass and reita; Gabriel Brochu-Lajoie on bass and double bass; Anit Ghosh on violin; Kattam Laraki-Côté on percussion; and Sylvain Plante on drums.

== History ==
Ayrad was organized in 2008 by Hamza Abouabdelmajid, who moved to Canada from Morocco in 2005. In July 2013, Ayrad was featured on the CBC Radio program Cinq à Six.

The band's debut album, Ayrad, which was released in 2014, was a nominee for World Music Album of the Year at the Juno Awards of 2015, and a nominee for a Félix Award at ADISQ 2015. That year, the album was also nominated for a GAMIQ Award for Best Roots Album in Quebec and was nominated for a Canadian Folk Music Award.

In 2018, the band released their second album, Zoubida which was nominated for World Music Album of the Year at the Juno Awards of 2019. At the 2020 Canadian Folk Music Awards, the band was awarded World Group of the Year.

In 2018 Ayrad performed in North Vancouver as part of the North Shore Jazz Series, and performed at Montreal's Festival International Nuits d'Afrique. Ayrad was the first performer named for the 2020 Festival International de Louisiane, but the festival was canceled due to the pandemic.

== Discography ==
- Ayrad (2014), COOP Les Faux-Monnayeurs
- Zoubida (2018), COOP Les Faux-Monnayeurs
