= Lhasa de Sela =

North American singer-songwriter

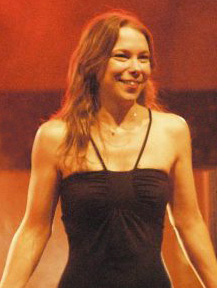
- Lhasa in Stuttgart in July 2005

Background information
- Also known as: Lhasa
- Born: September 27, 1972; Big Indian, New York, US
- Died: January 1, 2010 (aged 37) Montreal, Quebec, Canada
- Genres: Folk, World
- Occupation: Singer-songwriter
- Instrument: Vocals
- Years active: 1985–2009
- Label: Audiogram
- Website: lhasadesela.com

Lhasa de Sela (September 27, 1972 – January 1, 2010), also known by the mononym Lhasa, was an American-Mexican-Canadian singer-songwriter who was raised in Mexico and the United States and divided her adult life between Canada and France. Her first album, La Llorona, went Platinum in Canada and brought Lhasa a Félix Award and a Juno Award.

Following this success, Lhasa toured with Lilith Fair and then joined her sisters in a French circus troupe, contributing her husky voice to the musical backdrop. She lived in Marseille and began to write more songs, then she moved back to Montreal and produced a second album, The Living Road. Once again, she toured in support of her album and collaborated with other musicians on their projects. During this time, BBC Radio 3 honoured her as the best world music artist of the Americas in 2005. She published a book about her impressions of life on the road.

In 2008, Lhasa was diagnosed with breast cancer. During treatment, she wrote and recorded her third and final album, titled Lhasa, which was released in April 2009. After 21 months of treatment, she died on New Year's Day 2010. A memorial program of her music was produced in January 2012, performed in Montreal by artists who had worked with her.

== Early life ==
Lhasa was born in Big Indian, New York, the daughter of a Mexican father, language instructor Alejandro "Alex" Sela, and an American mother, photographer and actress Alexandra Karam. According to Lhasa, her parents did not give her a name until the age of five months; her mother was reading a book about Tibet and the word Lhasa "just grabbed her" as the right name for the baby girl. Lhasa's maternal grandmother was Elena Karam (1909–2001), an actress best known for her leading role in Elia Kazan's film America America. Her paternal grandmother was Carmen de Obarrio (1906–1982), a Panamanian pianist who studied in Los Angeles with Egon Petri, and with Edgar Varèse in San Francisco. Lhasa had a Lebanese great-grandfather named Basel who sang in six languages. Her mother played harp and her father played flute. Her first decade was spent criss-crossing the United States and Mexico, living and traveling in a converted school bus with her parents and siblings, home-schooled by her mother. Both her parents spoke fluent Spanish, but she was raised speaking primarily English, with Spanish added during a total of eight years' residence in Mexico. Along with her family she listened to a wide variety of recordings including songs by Chilean musician Victor Jara. As a child, she dreamed of marrying him some day, not knowing he had been killed.

At age 13 when her parents separated, Lhasa, her mother and her sisters settled in San Francisco where Lhasa started singing in a Greek cafe. She included Spanish language lessons in her high school studies. After viewing a documentary about Billie Holiday, Lhasa determined that she, too, would make a career in singing.

In 1991, she traveled to Montreal, Quebec, Canada to visit her sisters who were students at l'École nationale de cirque, Québec’s National Circus School, and she decided to make Montreal her home. Developing an interest in Francophone culture, she sang for five years in bars, collaborating with rock guitarist Yves Desrosiers. In 1992, Denis Wolff, general manager of the independent Canadian record company, Audiogram, saw Lhasa performing, her head shaved, in front of a tiny nightclub audience. He was struck with "her personality, her charisma and her voice" – he soon signed her to the label. With Desrosiers she developed the material that eventually became her first album.

== Career ==
Audiogram finished La Llorona in early 1997 with Desrosiers producing, arranging and accompanying. The Spanish-language album mixed 1930s and 1940s-era Latin American songs with original songs; it was strongly influenced by Mexican music but also by klezmer, torch songs, gypsy jazz and Middle Eastern music. Even though she did not consider herself fluent in Spanish, Lhasa said that she enjoyed singing in the language because it came from "a deeper place". Wolff said that he expected the album to be marketed to people other than Spanish speakers because it was so different from contemporary Hispanic music.

La Llorona was released first in Quebec on February 4, 1997, then in the US two months later. A music video was shot for one song, "El Desierto", released in May. The album brought Lhasa much success, including the Quebec Félix Award in Canada for "Artiste québécois – musique du monde" ("Best world music artist from Quebec") in 1997 and a Canadian Juno Award for Best Global Artist in 1998. The album was certified Platinum in Canada. By 2003, it had sold 120,000 units in Canada, 330,000 in France, and 30,000 in the US.

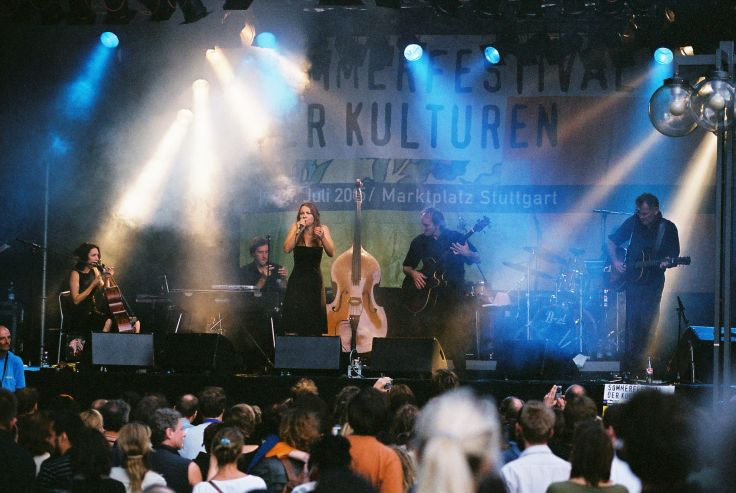
Lhasa performing in Stuttgart in 2005

After touring in Europe and North America for several years with Lilith Fair, Lhasa moved to France in 1999 to join her sisters in Pocheros, a circus/theatre company. Lhasa sang in the troupe's show called "La Maison Autre" ("The Other House"). Living out of trailers with her sisters and traveling from place to place, Lhasa said it was "like when I was growing up." She eventually reached Marseille, where she started writing songs again. After composing enough material, Lhasa returned to Montreal with her new songs to produce her second album, The Living Road, which was released in 2003. While La Llorona had been entirely in Spanish, The Living Road included songs in English, French and Spanish.

A two-year tour followed the release of The Living Road, taking Lhasa and her group to 17 countries. Lhasa collaborated with a variety of other artists. She was a guest singer on the Tindersticks' track "Sometimes It Hurts" off their Waiting for the Moon album, and later joined Tindersticks' singer Stuart Staples for a duet on the track "That Leaving Feeling", found on his Leaving Songs album. She also appeared as a guest on the albums of French singers Arthur H and Jérôme Minière, and the French gypsy music group Bratsch. BBC Radio 3 named her the best world music artist of the Americas; one of the categories of the 2005 World Music Awards. The Living Road was nominated for best "Culture Crossing" album and "Album of the Year", but it did not win. Her song "Anywhere On This Road" was placed on the annual compilation CD of award winners; the BBC cited Ibrahim Maalouf's "alluring Arabic trumpet" on the song as "just one stunning moment" among many within Lhasa's album. Lhasa filmed a video for the song "Con toda palabra"; directed by Ralph Dfouni and Brigitte Henry, the video was nominated in 2006 for a Juno Award but did not win. At the 2007 ION International Film Festival, the video was named the "Music Video of the Year".

Lhasa published a French-language book in 2008, titled La Route chante (The Road sings). The book offers snippets of experiences and impressions of Lhasa's life on the road with her sisters, of music, and of her childhood.

Lhasa's third album Lhasa was released in April 2009 in Canada and Europe, with fewer musicians involved in the production. The album was recorded while Lhasa was being treated for breast cancer. The album's closing song, "Anyone and Everyone", was described as prophetic by Jan Fairley of The Guardian – it was written from the viewpoint of one who knows death is near. Lhasa said that the song was about inner happiness and "feeling my feet in the earth, having a place in the world, of things taking care of themselves." In May 2009, her collaboration with Patrick Watson was released: the song "Wooden Arms" on his album Wooden Arms.

Because of her illness, Lhasa canceled a proposed world tour that would have begun in late 2009. She also set aside plans to make an album of songs written by Chileans Victor Jara and Violeta Parra.

== Death ==
Following a 21-month-long battle with breast cancer, Lhasa died, age 37, on the evening of January 1, 2010, at her home in Montreal. She was survived by her partner Ryan Morey, by her parents, and by nine siblings. Lhasa was cremated, in accordance with her wishes. On January 9, a funeral ceremony was held for family and friends at the Ukrainian National Federation Hall in Montreal. A cemetery plot and stone for Lhasa are at Notre-Dame-des-Neiges Cemetery, Montreal.

Following her death, it snowed in Montreal for four days. Lhasa collaborator Patrick Watson said that some of her friends felt it was a last message from her, and with experimental group Esmerine he co-wrote a song dedicated to Lhasa: "Snow Day for Lhasa".

A sold-out memorial concert called "La Route chante: A Community Show for Lhasa" was held on January 6, 2012, at the Rialto Theatre in Montreal, honoring the life of Lhasa. Musicians who collaborated with Lhasa performed, along with other artists such as Katie Moore, Thomas Hellman, and Plants and Animals. Lhasa's manager, David-Étienne Savoie, and her collaborator Watson originated the concept of a memorial concert, and the musicians met in Watson's studio to rehearse. To open the concert, the Barr Brothers played together with Sarah Pagé, Miles Perkin and Joe Grass, interpreting Lhasa's "Small Song". Other performers included Ariane Moffatt, Esmerine, Watson, Mario Légaré, Arthur H, Jérôme Minière and Brazilian-born singer Bïa. A second show was added the following night to accommodate demand for tickets.

On January 16, Jim Corcoran devoted an episode of his CBC Radio One program À Propos, a weekly show about Quebec music, to a Lhasa tribute show.

On the summer solstice, June 21, 2010, another memorial ceremony took place in Bourgogne, France. Some of Lhasa's ashes were dispersed in a small river that flows into the Mediterranean Sea.

Madonna Hamel's audio documentary She Moves Between Worlds: Remembering Lhasa de Sela combined a previously unpublished conversation between Hamel and Lhasa with interviews and responses to the conversation by band members and friends. The documentary was aired January 1, 2013, on CBC's Inside The Music.

In 2014, a park located in her home neighbourhood Mile End, Montreal, was renamed to commemorate her.

She is the subject of Lhasa, a forthcoming documentary film by Sophie Leblond.

== Discography ==
=== Albums ===
- La Llorona (1997)
- The Living Road (2003)
- Lhasa (2009)
- Live in Reykjavik (2017)
- First Recordings (with Yves Desrosiers) (2024)

== Filmography ==
- El Desierto (1997)
- Con toda palabra (2005)
- Rising (2009)
- Cold Souls (2009)
