= Jaffa Road (band) =

Canadian musical group

- Origin: Toronto, Ontario, Canada
- Genre: World music
- Years active: 2005–present
- Members: Aaron Lightstone; Tamar Ilana; Justin Gray; Rakesh Tewari; Sundar Viswanathan; Shawn Rompre
- Past members: Chris Gartner; Aviva Chernick; Jeff Wilson
- Website: jaffaroad.com

Jaffa Road are a Canadian world music group based in Toronto, Ontario. The band mixes ancient and original poetry in Hebrew, Spanish and English with belly dance rhythms, pulsating dub grooves, improvisations, and a global mix of instrumentation, including electronica and dub. The band was nominated for a 2010 Juno Award for their debut album Sunplace in the category World Music Album of the Year.

== History ==
Jaffa Road was formed in 2005 in Toronto. Their first album, Sunplace, was released in 2009. They performed at the North by Northeast festival in 2010 and the Wreckhouse International Jazz and Blues Festival in 2011.

In 2012, the band released their second album, Where the Light Gets In.

== Awards ==
In September 2009, Jaffa Road's "L.Y.G." (Lo Yisa Goy) from the CD Sunplace won the Grand Prize in the John Lennon Song Writing Contest - World Music Category.

In early 2010, Jaffa Road was nominated for a Juno Award (World Music). In July 2010, Jaffa Road was awarded Best world music artist at the Toronto Independent Music Awards.

== Discography ==
- 2009 SunPlace
- 2012 Where The Light Gets In
- 2021 Until When

== See also ==
- Music of Canada
- List of bands from Canada
- Jaffa Road
