= Djely Tapa =

Malian-Canadian musician

Djely Tapa is the stage name of Sountougoumba Diarra, a Malian-Canadian musician, who performs and records both as a solo artist, and as leader of the Afrobeat group Afrikana Soul Sister. Her solo album Barokan won the Juno Award for World Music Album of the Year at the Juno Awards of 2020.

Born and raised in Mali, Diarra moved to Canada to study sciences, but retained her interest and participation in music. Her music draws on the griot tradition of West African music and literature.
