= Lhasa (Lhasa album) =

Studio album by Lhasa
- Released: April 2009 (Canada)
- Genre: Folk
- Label: Warner Music

Lhasa chronology
The Living Road (2003)	Lhasa (2009)

Professional ratings
Review scores
Source	Rating
AllMusic	4/5 stars

Lhasa is the third and final album by singer Lhasa, released in 2009 on Warner Music. It is her only album entirely sung in English. The album was nominated for the 2009 Polaris Music Prize on June 15, 2009.

After Lhasa's death was announced on January 3, 2010, the album rapidly reascended the Canadian Albums Chart, jumping from number 142 to number 24 in just one week.

== Track listing ==
1. "Is Anything Wrong"
2. "Rising"
3. "Love Came Here"
4. "What Kind of Heart"
5. "Bells Are Ringing"
6. "Fool's Gold"
7. "A Fish on Land"
8. "Where Do You Go"
9. "The Lonely Spider"
10. "1001 Nights"
11. "I'm Going In"
12. "Anyone and Everyone"
