= AfroNubians =

Canadian world music band

The AfroNubians (also known as Tarig Abubakar & The Afro Nubians) was a world music band based in Toronto. They played newly composed and traditional pan-African-style music, blended with Latin, reggae, rock sounds.

== History ==
The AfroNubians came together in 1992. The group's founders included Sudanese immigrant Tarig Abubakar (1964–1998) as leader and principal composer, guitarist Adam Solomon, lead guitarist Joe Szilagy (aka Joe Slant), keyboardist Wail Hajelamin, drummer Kofi Acka, saxophonist Bruno Hedman and bassist Mohammed Hajelamin.

In 1993, the AfroNubians toured western Canada, and in 1994 released their first album, Tour to Africa. In 1995, they released the album The Great Africans and were named Band of the Year at the Toronto African Music Awards. That was followed by three tours across Canada and, in 1997, the Toronto Arts Council released their third album, Hobey Laik.

In 1998, shortly before the band was scheduled to embark on its first U.S. tour, Abubakar took a trip to Sudan and was killed in a motor vehicle accident.

In 2005, the Canadian Broadcasting Corporation released a CD, produced by Todd Fraracci, of two of the band's live concerts. Musicians included on the CD with Abubakar, Solomon, and Szilagy were Bruno Hedman (saxophone), Jim Heineman (saxophone and flute), Pa Jo (lead guitar), Altaf Bwana Moto (drums) and Joseph Ashong (percussion).

== Discography ==
- 1994: Tour to Africa
- 1995: The Great Africans
- 1997: Hobey Laik
- 2005: Tarig Abubakar & Afronubians Live
