= Boogat =

Boogát
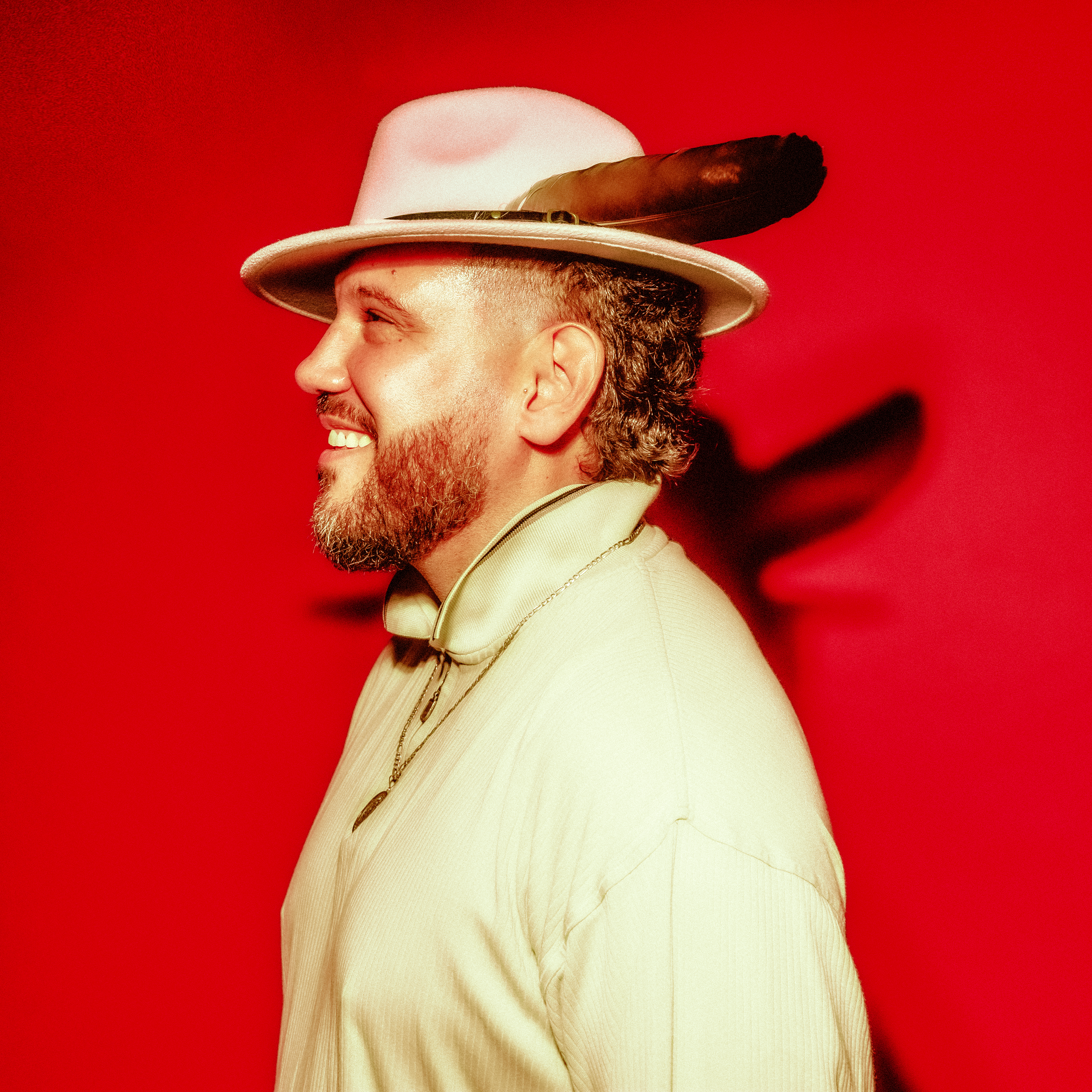

Background information
- Born: Daniel Russo Garrido
- Origin: Quebec City, Quebec, Canada
- Genres: Latin, urban, electronic
- Occupations: Singer, beat maker, producer
- Instruments: Akaï MPC 2000 XL, 1000, Live
- Years active: 2004–present
- Labels: Norté, Ray-On, Maisonnette
- Website: www.boogat.com

Boogát is a second generation Latin-American immigrant musician born in Quebec City, Quebec, with roots in Mexico and Paraguay. His style blends hip hop with Latin music styles such as cumbia, salsa, danzón and reggaeton. He won the 2024 GAMIQ Award for Sono Mondiale Album of the Year for his album Del Horizonte, the same award in 2014 for El Dorado Sunset, a Juno Award for World Music Album of the Year for his album Neo-Reconquista at the Juno Awards of 2016 and the ADISQ Awards for World Music Album of 2016. In 2013 he won two Prix Félix Awards for El Dorado Sunset, one for World Music album of ADISQ 2013 and another one for Best Production of 2013.

Boogát was raised in the south part of Beauport, nicknamed Beauport Beach. He moved to Montreal in 2001 where his career took off, producing for other artists and touring in a dozen of countries. In 2015 he stayed in CDMX for a year to work with producer Andrés Oddone. Moving back to Canada in 2016, he established himself in the village of Eastman, Québec; in the heart of the Eastern Townships near the Vermont border where he co-opened a creative space called La Mésanine.

Performing initially in French, Boogát switched to Spanish after playing with several bands of other genres that always asked him to do it in Spanish. He released his first full-length Spanish album El Dorado Sunset in 2013, collaborating with Lido Pimienta, Karim de Syncop, Chele, Madhi, Schlachthofbronx, El Kool Kyle, Kid Koala, Poirier and Radio Radio.

Neo-Reconquista, which includes collaborations with La Yegros, Sonido Pesado and Pierre Kwenders, was released in 2015. Exclaim! gave the album an 8/10, noting that Boogat has "long moved past being known simply as a "Spanish-language rapper from Quebec" and who has committed to a more textured artistic evolution and genre-agnostic growth".

In 2017, San Cristóbal Baile Inn, an album recorded and produced in Mexico which includes collaborations with Frikstailers, Miss Bolivia, Niña Dioz, and Lemon Bucket Orkestra, was released.

El Gato y Los Rumberos, an acoustic EP recorded in Eastman by Boogát and inspired by the Latino Big Bands era of the 1920s to the 1950s, was released in 2020. Exclaim! gave the EP a 9/10.

Del Horizonte was released in 2024, produced by Boogát, featuring the work of Okan, Mateus Vidal, Mestre Pato, Maï, Diogo Ramos, Waahli, Shub, El Dusty and Ahmed Moneka. Le Devoir gave the album four stars

Les Sessions Kanasuta was released early 2025 as a short collaborative EP with the work of Onha, Alice Vande Voorde, Marceau Simon. The EP was made during a creative retreat at the Kanasuta Lake in Abitibi Témiscamingue.

Mucho Love was released on November 4th, 2025, as a 20 minutes, 6 tracks EP. It's the first part of a trilogy (two EPs and an LP) and is a love letter to Life, the Audience, Music, Culture, Friendships, and Family, featuring collaborations with Bïa, Galamba, and Ana Lía.

== Discography ==
Albums

- Del Horizonte (2024)
- San Cristóbal Baile Inn (2017)
- Neo-Reconquista (2015)
- El Dorado Sunset (2013)

EPs and singles

- Mucho Love EP (2025)
- Les Session Kanasuta EP (2025)
- Entre Nous w/ Jenny Salgado, Montana (2022)
- Promesa de Venganza w/ Tomi Sheep (2022)
- El Gato y Los Rumberos EP (2020)
- Mezcalero Feliz EP (2017)
- Aquí EP (2017)
- Eres Una Bomba EP (2017)
- Moviembre w/ G-Flux (2012)
- Pura Vida EP (2011)
- Esa Mujer (2011)

Mixtapes & Compilations

- Sunset Remixes (2014)
- Esperanto Sound System (2011)
- Que Pegue Duro y Violento (2010)

Music Videos

- Corazón (2025)
- Todo Saldrá Bien (2025)
- + Que 1 Chingx (2024)
- Siempre Bailo (2024)
- Eres Una Bomba (2017)
- Mezcalero Feliz (2017)
- Me Muero Por Ti (2015)
- Eres Hecha Para Mi (2013)
- Moviembre (2012)
- Esa Mujer (2011)

Remixes X Boogát

- Elle Danse for Mimi O'Bonsawin (2025)
- Cabasa for Diogo Ramos (2025)
- Tout de toi for Bermuda (2024)
- Beach Bodé for Bermuda (2024)
- Still Got The Spirit for Bye Parula (2023)
- Tite Puff de Love for Bermuda (2023)
- Las Lunas for Bial H Clap (2022)
- Flores en la Arena for Montañera (2021)
- Café com Leite ft. Flavia Coelho for Poirier (2021)

Production X Boogát

- When we get Older X Dominique Claire (2025)
- Ave Maria X Georgette (2025)
- Deja Fluir X Edith Swundy (2025)
- Kouri X Waahli (2025)
- Y Si Se Acaba El Mundo X Maï (2025)
- Enfants Fauves LP X Funk Lion (2024)
- Tiempo X Maï (2024)
- Blackman Samba X Wesli (2024)
- Après la Pluie X Alfa Rococo ft. Ramon Chicharron (2023)
- Ideas in Mind X Aroe Phoenix (2023)
- El Paseo Del Alma EP X Chellz (2022)
- Soap Box LP X Waahli (2022)
- Raro Efeito EP X Diogo Ramos (2021)
- Todo Revuelto LP X Sonido Pesao (2020)
- Soap Opera EP X Waahli (2020)
- Pescador de Sueños LP X Ramon Chicharron (2020)

Albums as BØØG4T (in French)

- Rmx Volume 1 (2008)
- Patte de salamandre (2006)
- Triste et belles histoires (2004)

EPs and Singles as BØØG4T (in French)

- Madernité w/ Bermuda (2023)

Videos as BØØG4T (in French)

- Le Feu ft. Karim Ouellet, Accrophone, Les 2 Tom, KNLO (2006)
- Nebuloso (2005)
- À la Vie ft. Accrophone (2004)
