= Schuld & Stamer =

- Origin: Vancouver, British Columbia, Canada
- Genres: Blues; jazz
- Years active: 1996–present
- Label: Brouhaha Records Group-Blue Streak Records
- Members: Andreas Schuld; Hans Stamer
- Website: brouhaharecords.com

Schuld & Stamer are a Canadian blues duo made up of guitarist Andreas Schuld and vocalist Hans Stamer. In 1998, their debut album No Special Rider was nominated for a Juno Award. Schuld & Stamer's records often achieve critical acclaim and feature notable guests like Long John Baldry and Bill Bourne.

== Discography ==
=== Albums ===
Year	Title	Label	Cat. No.	Recorded
1997	No Special Rider	Blue Streak Records	BSCD97001	October 4, 1996
1998	You Got the Bread... We Got the Jam!	Blue Streak Records	BSCD98001	April 1998
2014	Kuddelmuddel	Blue Streak Records	BSCD2014002	2012-2014
