= ION International Film Festival =

Annual event in Nigeria

ION International Film festival
- Language: English

Origin
- Meaning: Local Wrestling
- Region of origin: Igbo, Nigeria

The ION International Film Festival occurs every December in Port Harcourt Rivers State, Nigeria.

== Aims ==
The ION International Film Festival travels around the world every year to promote awareness and unity by creating films with social relevance that will positively affect the planet. A number of events are held during the four days that make up this festival. The gatherings are designed to provide directors, celebrities, and producers with an opportunity to network and learn from one another.

ION International Film Festival is a touring festival dedicated to promoting independent films, documentaries, animations, original screenplays, and music videos. It honors and promotes individuals for their outstanding achievements while encouraging new artists to emerge.
