= La Llorona (Lhasa de Sela album) =

Studio album by Lhasa de Sela
- Released: 4 February 1997
- Recorded: Chez Frank Studios, Montreal
- Genre: Latin, folk, world music, Gypsy jazz
- Length: 44:16
- Label: Audiogram (Canada), Atlantic (USA)

Lhasa de Sela chronology
La Llorona (1997)	The Living Road (2003)

Professional ratings
Review scores
Source	Rating
Allmusic	link

La Llorona is the debut studio album by Canadian singer Lhasa de Sela, released in 1997 in Canada and 1998 elsewhere.

== Concept ==
Alejandro Sela, Lhasa's father, received his doctorate on literature of the Spanish conquest of the Aztec Empire and taught her of the legend of La Llorona. This folktale of the crying woman resembled the mythological wife of Quetzalcoatl who has lost her children. For Lhasa, La Llorona comes from the omen of conquerors. Lhasa believes that the woman cried when the Spanish arrived in America to warn her native children of the doom that the conquistadors would bring to their way of life.

== Sales and certifications ==
According to billboard in 2003, it had sold 120,000 units in Canada (Platinium), 330,000 in France, and 30,000 in the U.S

== Track listing ==
All music and lyrics by Lhasa de Sela and Yves Desrosiers except where noted.

No.	Title	Writer(s)	Length
1.	"De cara a la pared"		4:16
2.	"La Celestina"		4:47
3.	"El desierto"		3:53
4.	"Por eso me quedo"		3:51
5.	"El payande"	Traditional, arranged by De Sela and Desrosiers	3:32
6.	"Los peces"	Traditional, arranged by De Sela and Desrosiers	3:51
7.	"Floricanto"	De Sela, Desrosiers, Alex de Sela	4:10
8.	"Desdeñosa"	Traditional, arranged by De Sela and Desrosiers	4:34
9.	"El Pájaro"		3:58
10.	"Mi vanidad"		4:13
11.	"El árbol del olvido"	Fernan Silva Valdez, Alberto Ginastera	3:11

== Personnel ==
=== Musicians ===
- Lhasa de Sela - Vocals, artwork, English and French translations
- Yves Desrosiers - Guitars, lap steel, bass, saw, accordion, banjo, percussion, production, arranging
- Mario Légaré - Bass, double bass
- François Lalonde - Percussion, drums, sampling, programming

=== Production ===
- Pierre Marchand - Mixing
- Jean Massicotte - Mixing
- Don Hachey - Assistant mixing
- Jean Bouthillette - Technical coordination
- Jean-Francois Chicoine - Mastering
- Eve Cournoyer - Graphic coordination
- Lousank - Graphic design
- Carl Lessard - Photography
- Alissa Hill - Makeup
- Sandra Khouri - French translations
