= Flying Bulgar Klezmer Band =

Canadian folk music band (1988–2010)

Flying Bulgars
- Also known as: Flying Bulgar Klezmer Band
- Origin: Canada
- Genres: Klezmer
- Years active: 1988–2010
- Label: Traditional Crossroads
- Past members: David Buchbinder; Dave Wall; Max Senitt; Peter Lutek; Tania Gill; Victor Bateman; Allen Cole; Daniel Barnes; Marilyn Lerner; Bob Stevenson; Laura Cesa; John Lennard; Martin Van de Ven; Allan Merovitz; Andrew Downing

The Flying Bulgars (formerly the Flying Bulgar Klezmer Band) was a Toronto-based Canadian band, which played music rooted in the Jewish music of Eastern Europe. The band's style incorporated elements of rock, jazz and salsa. 'Bulgar' in the group's name refers to a dance form, not an ethnic group.

The band's final line-up consisted of David Buchbinder (trumpet), Dave Wall (of the Bourbon Tabernacle Choir) (guitar), Max Senitt (drums), Peter Lutek (woodwinds), Tania Gill (piano) and Victor Bateman (bass).

The Bulgars recorded five CDs and received three Juno nominations. They are the only Klezmer band to have created a music video which received airplay on MuchMusic.

== Background ==
After the founding of Israel in 1948, the Yiddish language and the art associated with it were marginalized by many Jews, for whom Yiddish represented the ghettos of Eastern Europe and the holocaust. In the fifties and sixties it was chic to sing songs in Hebrew, the language of the new Jewish state. In 1975, a group of young San Francisco musicians, The Klezmorim, released an album called East Side Wedding, and the Klezmer renaissance was on. Across North America and Europe dozens of new groups sprang up, reclaiming the tradition of Eastern European Jewish music. Klezmer music brought together the traditions of the Tsarist Russian military band, Gypsy music, Nigun (Hasidic religious song), and Afro-American jazz. The Jewish New Wave, as it came to be called, brought funk, R&B, new music and free jazz into the mix.

The Flying Bulgars was a product of the rebirth of interest in Yiddish culture in North America. While they performed material from the early days of Klezmer, the majority of their repertoire was new music written by band members. The development of a personal sound, along with a highly charged performance style, opened extensive performing opportunities.

== Biography ==
Formed by Buchbinder in 1988, and co-led by Dave Wall, The Flying Bulgar Klezmer Band was a product of the rebirth of interest in Yiddish culture in North America. In 1988, they played its first concert at Toronto's famed Clinton's Tavern. That was followed by a 1989 show as part of the Mariposa Folk Festival (to which it would return in 1992).

In 1990, the band released its first (self-named) album. and performed at the Folk on the Rocks Festival in Yellowknife (it would return the following year). The album was nominated for Best World Beat Recording at the Juno Awards of 1992.

By 1993, the band name had been changed to The Flying Bulgars, and the band released its second album, Agada. The album was very well received and was nominated for Best Global Recording at the Juno Awards of 1994. The band toured in support of the album, appearing at the Vancouver Folk Festival and Mayfest Glasgow in 1994.

In 1996, The Flying Bulgars released their third album Fire, with the Yiddish singer Adrienne Cooper. That year, with the popularity of the genre growing, the band played at Klezmer Mania! in Berkeley, California, and played shows in various North American cities.

The band's fourth album, Tsirkus, was released in 1999. Further, in 2000, they performed at New York's Bell Atlantic Jazz Festival. In March 2001, the Flying Bulgars were part of Toronto's Feast of the East festival; their performance was aired on CBC Radio's Play with Jian Ghomeshi.

In May 2002, the Flying Bulgars performed their show Shekhine-Spirit in the Natural World before a sold-out crowd at Toronto's Isabel Bader Theatre. The concert (which featured guest artists Jane Bunnett, Levon Ichkhanian, Rick Shadrach Lazar, Stephen Donald and Alex Poch-Goldin) was the group's first theatrical presentation, melding music, poetry and visual elements (stage design and video).

A recording of this work, produced by David Travers-Smith and featuring new compositions by every band member, was released in June 2003 as Sweet Return. Sweet Return received rave reviews and was nominated as World Music Album of the Year at the Juno Awards of 2004.

In 2004, the band started off with an appearance as a headliner at the Chutzpah! Festival in Vancouver. It played at Ottawa's Tulip Festival, the Nova Scotia Multicultural Festival, Festival d'été de Québec and, back in British Columbia, the Mission Folk Festival.

The Flying Bulgars have toured throughout Canada, and performed internationally, including at the WOMAD festival in Morcombe, England, and the Tollwood Festival in Munich. They also participated annually in the Ashkenaz Festival in Toronto, a festival of Jewish culture which was founded by David Buchbinder and is one of the world's most prestigious festivals of its kind.

The Bulgars sixth studio album, Tumbling Into Light, was released on November 10, 2009. The recording was produced by David Newfeld and engineered by Jeremy Darby at Toronto's Canterbury Music Company. On January 31, 2010, the band staged a multi-media, multi-disciplinary performance of Tumbling Into Light featuring Andrea Mann (dance), Bruce McDonald (film) and Lorenzo Savoini (design) at the Young Centre for the Performing Arts. It was directed by McDonald, and co-produced by the band, McDonald and BravoFACT.

The Flying Bulgars disbanded in 2010 but, on February 3, 2018, they played a show to mark the 30th anniversary of their first performance at Clinton's Tavern.

== Discography ==
=== Albums ===
- Flying Bulgar Klezmer Band – 1990 (Traditional Crossroads)
- Agada – 1993 (Traditional Crossroads)
- Fire – 1996 (Traditional Crossroads)
- Tsirkus – 1999 (Traditional Crossroads)
- Sweet Return – 2003 (Flying Bulgar Recordings)
- Tumbling Into Light – 2009 (Flying Bulgar Recordings)
