= Djolé =

Djolé (also known as Jolé or Yolé) is a mask-dance from Temine people in Sierra Leone. It is played traditionally with a large square drum called sikko.

Although a mask depicts a female, it is carried by a male.

Djolé is played usually during big feasts which involve many villages to celebrate a good harvest, the end of the Ramadan or a marriage.

Nowadays the rhythm has been rearranged to be played with the djembé and is very popular in particular in Guinea.

== Lyrics ==
Laila i ko korobé, korobé, korobé, mami watoné, aya, sico leleleko aya

sico la i ko na, sico la i ko, wa wango sico la i ko, wa wango sico la i ko
