= Okavango African Orchestra =

Canadian musical group

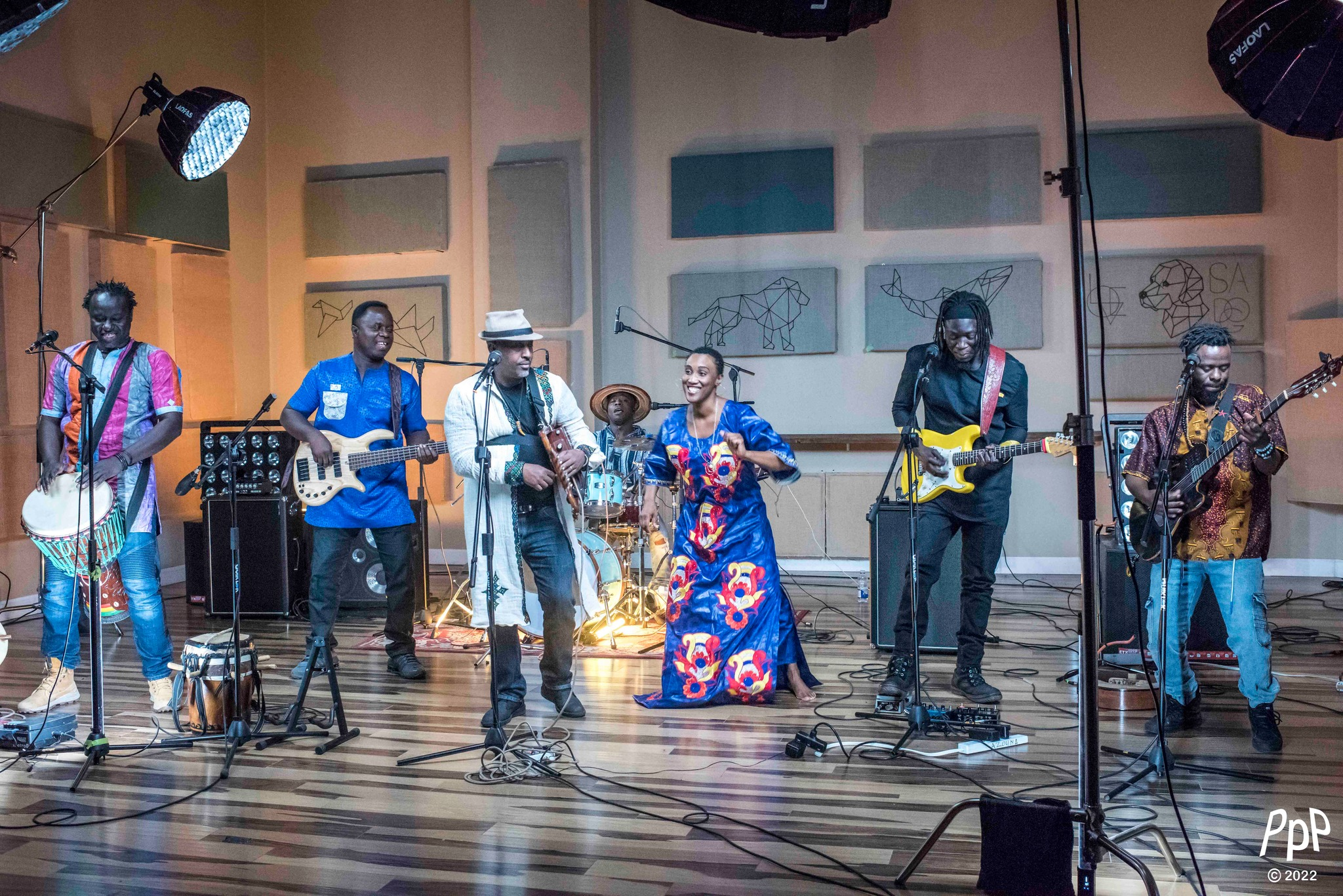

Okavango African Orchestra is a Canadian musical group from Toronto, Ontario, which won the Juno Award for World Music Album of the Year at the Juno Awards of 2017 for its self-titled debut album. It aims to celebrate and promote the diversity of African music, by recording and performing music in many different African styles and incorporating many of Africa's unique musical instruments.

It formed in 2010 through the Batuki Music Society, a Toronto-based organization which promotes traditional African arts and music in the city. The original members were Daniel Nebiat on krar, Sadio Sissokho on kora, Waleed Abdulhamid on gimbri, Nuudi Kooshin on kaban, Pasipamire Gunguwo on mbira, Donné Roberts on guitar, and Walter MacLean on percussion. The lineup as of 2018 includes Nebiat, Sissokho, Donné Roberts, Ebenezer Agyekum, Kofi Ackah, Nicolas Simbananiye, and Tichaona Maredza. The members in 2023 include Daniel Nebiat, Kofi Ackah, Ebenezer Agyekum, Tichoana Maredza, Sadio Sissokho, Assane Seck, and Mabinty Sylla.

Okavango African Orchestra has released 3 albums:

- Okavango African Orchestra, 2017, JUNO Award for World Music Album of the Year
- Africa Without Borders, 2019, JUNO nomination, Canadian Folk Music nomination
- Migration, 2023
