= Celso Machado =

- Born: January 27, 1953 (age 73)
- Genres: World
- Occupation: Multi-instrumentalist
- Instruments: Guitar, percussion
- Website: www.celsomachado.com

Celso Machado (born January 27, 1953) is a Brazilian world music guitarist, percussionist and multi-instrumentalist who lives in Gibsons, British Columbia, Canada. For over forty years he has performed on concert stages throughout Brazil, Western Europe and Canada, as well as in the United States. He is active as a teacher, composer and recording artist. According to his biography, he has played onstage with guitarists Sergio and Odair Assad, Badi Assad, Romero Lubambo, Yamandu Costa, Cristina Azuma, Peter Finger, and Solorazaf and has been an opening act for Brazilian jazz musicians including Gilberto Gil and Bebel Gilberto.

He is known for the ability to produce imitations of birdcalls using wind and percussion instruments.

== Discography ==
- Brasil, Violão (1977)
- Violão, Celso Machado (1980)
- Tupis (1989)
- Bagagem (1994)
- Varal (1997)
- Jongo Lê (1998)
- Capivara (2005)
- Rosewood Café (2018)
- Costas: Works For Guitar And Flute (2018)
- Beginnings (20th Century Music For Saxophone And Guitar) (2020)
