= Madagascar Slim =

- Born: Randriamananjara Radofa Besata Jean Longin; 1956 (age 68–69); Antananarivo, Madagascar
- Origin: Canada
- Genres: Folk; blues
- Occupation: Guitarist
- Instrument: Guitar

Randriamananjara Radofa Besata Jean Longin (born October 31, 1956, in Antananarivo, Madagascar) is a Canadian-Malagasy folk and blues guitarist, who records and performs under the stage name Madagascar Slim. He is a member of the folk music band Tri-Continental and the world music group African Guitar Summit, as well as a solo artist and a regular collaborator with blues singer Ndidi Onukwulu.

He moved to Canada in 1979 to study English and accounting at Seneca College, pursuing music with the folk group La Ridaine while studying. He has cited Jimi Hendrix and B. B. King as the two primary influences on his choice to become a guitarist.

He is a three-time Juno Award winner, having won World Music Album of the Year in 2000 for his solo album Omnisource and in 2005 with African Guitar Summit, and Roots & Traditional Album of the Year in 2001 with Tri-Continental.

== Discography ==
- 2000 OmniSource
- 2009 Good Life Good Living

With Tri-Continental

- 2000 Tri-Continental
- 2002 Live
- 2003 Let's Play
- 2004 Drifting
- 2018 Dust Dance

With Other Artists

- 2005 African Guitar Summit
- 2006 African Guitar Summit II
