= Festival d'été de Québec =

Annual music festival in Quebec City, Quebec

Coordinates: 46.8017°N 71.2211°W

FEQ
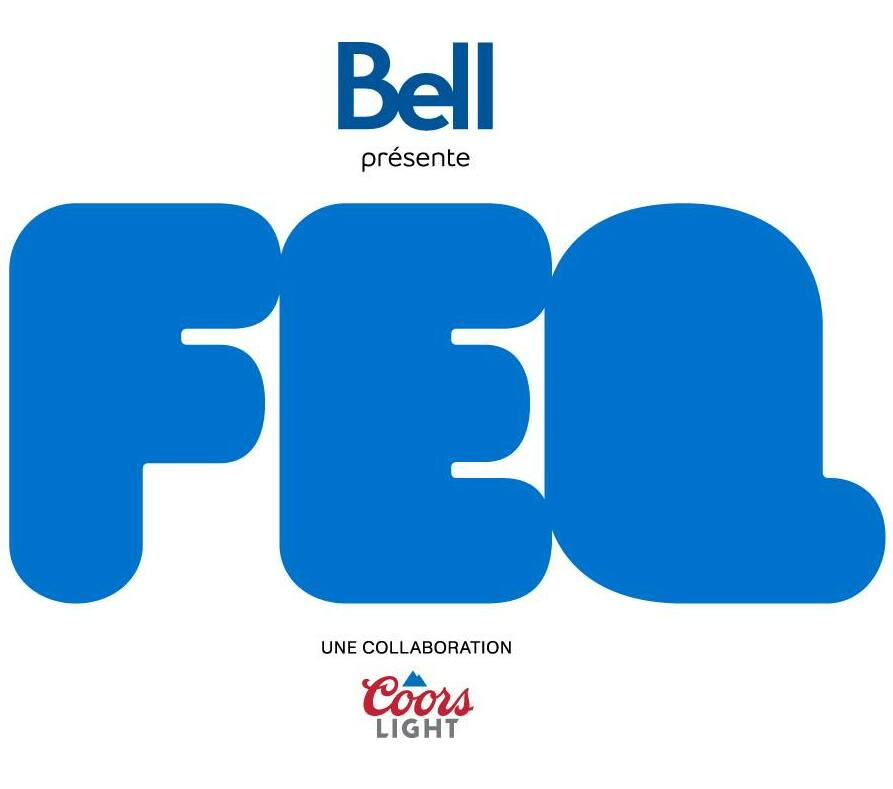
- Genre: Blues, country, electronic dance music, folk, hip-hop, jazz, latin, pop, r&b, rock
- Dates: July 8–18 (2027)
- Locations: Quebec City, Quebec, Canada
- Years active: 1968–present
- Attendance: 1,330,000 (2026, 11 days total)
- Capacity: 125,000 (all stages combined)
- Website: www.feq.ca/en/

The Festival d'été de Québec (Quebec City Summer Festival from French), also known as the FEQ, is a major outdoor music festival held annually in downtown Quebec City, Quebec. Founded in 1968, the 11-day festival takes place every year in mid-July, and is the second-largest music festival in Canada by its attendance numbers. Its main stage has a capacity for up to 100,000 people, and is the largest outdoor stage in Canada. The FEQ's programming includes many international stars and emerging artists from around the globe.

== History ==
The FEQ has been taking place annually since 1968. The first editions were organized by a group of businesspersons and artists of Quebec City in order to show the artistic, economic, and tourist potential of the region. During the 1970s and 1980s, the festival specialized in musicians from the francophones and world music.

The festival grew substantially during the last few decades after its decision to diversify its music offering and go after international headliners from genres across the board, including country, EDM, hip-hop, jazz, pop, and rock artists.

The festival reached the million spectators mark for the first time in 2007 and has sold out for the first time in 2010.

Since February 2022, the organization behind Festival d’été de Québec is named BLEUFEU.

== Setting ==
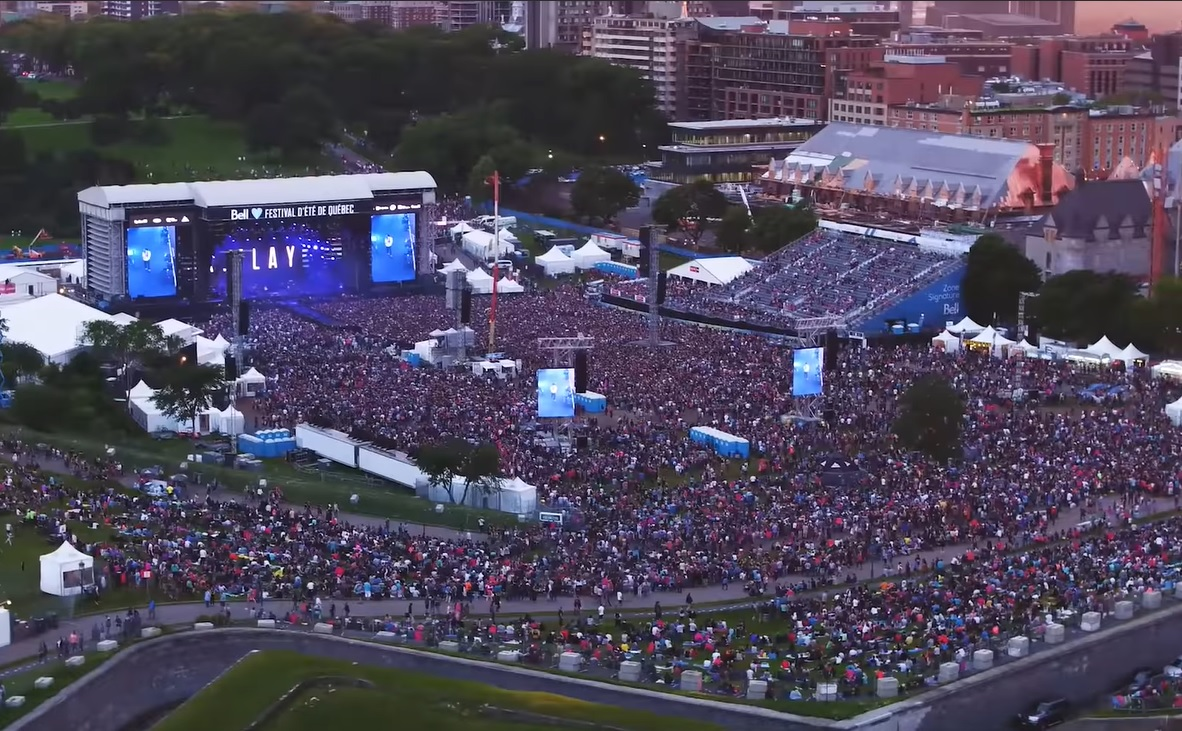
The Bell Stage on the Plains of Abraham

The outdoor stages:

- Bell Stage (capacity of 100,000)
- Parc Grande Allée (capacity of 15,000; two stages in alternation with no waiting time between sets)
  - Loto-Québec Stage (right side)
  - SiriusXM Stage (left side)
- Hydro-Québec Stage (capacity of 7,000)
- Crave Stage (capacity of 2,000)

The indoor venue:

- Quebec City Armoury (for all Extra-FEQ concerts starting around midnight, with capacity of 1,000)

== Major headliners since 2010 ==
- 2010: Black Eyed Peas, Rammstein, Rush, Iron Maiden, Santana, Arcade Fire, Dream Theater, Steve Winwood, Lara Fabian, Steve Hackett.
- 2011: Elton John, Metallica, Avenged Sevenfold, The Black Keys, Dropkick Murphys, John Fogerty, Ben Harper, Simple Plan, Hollywood Undead.
- 2012: Bon Jovi, Aerosmith, Lionel Richie, LMFAO, The Offspring, Our Lady Peace, Sarah McLachlan, Skrillex, Metric, Mastodon, City and Colour.
- 2013: Bruno Mars, Def Leppard, Guns N' Roses, Wu-Tang Clan, Weezer, Rush, Stevie Wonder, Foreigner, The Black Keys, Tiësto, Ellie Goulding.
- 2014: Lady Gaga, Billy Joel, Journey, Bryan Adams, The Killers, Soundgarden, Snoop Dogg, Queens Of The Stone Age, Deadmau5, Cypress Hill.
- 2015: The Rolling Stones, Foo Fighters, Boston, Megadeth, Keith Urban, Deep Purple, The Doobie Brothers, Jack Ü, Iggy Azalea, Milky Chance.
- 2016: Rammstein, Sting, Peter Gabriel, Red Hot Chili Peppers, Duran Duran, Selena Gomez, Ice Cube, Brad Paisley, The Lumineers, The Cult.
- 2017: Muse, The Who, Metallica, P!nk, Gorillaz, Kendrick Lamar, The Backstreet Boys, Lady Antebellum, Flume, Melissa Etheridge, Migos, DNCE.
- 2018: The Weeknd, Foo Fighters, Neil Young, Shawn Mendes, Dave Matthews Band, The Chainsmokers, Machine Gun Kelly, Future, Beck, Lorde.
- 2019: Twenty One Pilots, Mariah Carey, Slipknot, Imagine Dragons, Blink-182, Lynyrd Skynyrd, Kygo, Logic, Alt-J, Corey Hart, The Offspring, Live.
- 2022: Rage Against the Machine, Maroon 5, Luke Combs, Alanis Morissette, Three Days Grace, Marshmello, Halsey, Jack Johnson, Garbage.
- 2023: Green Day, Foo Fighters, Imagine Dragons, Lana Del Rey, Zach Bryan, Billy Talent, Weezer, Pitbull, Bad Religion, Lamb of God, Illenium.
- 2024: Nickelback, Post Malone, Jonas Brothers, Zac Brown Band, The Offspring, Mötley Crüe, 50 Cent, Kansas, Alan Walker, J Balvin, Ava Max.
- 2025: Shania Twain, Avril Lavigne, Rod Stewart, Def Leppard, Slayer, Hozier, Benson Boone, Richard Marx, Farruko, In Flames, Alessia Cara.
- 2026: Limp Bizkit, Muse, Jelly Roll, Gwen Stefani, Michael Bublé, The Lumineers, Kesha, Martin Garrix, Luis Fonsi, Testament, Nate Smith.
