= Alpha Yaya Diallo =

Guinean-Canadian musician (born 1963/64)

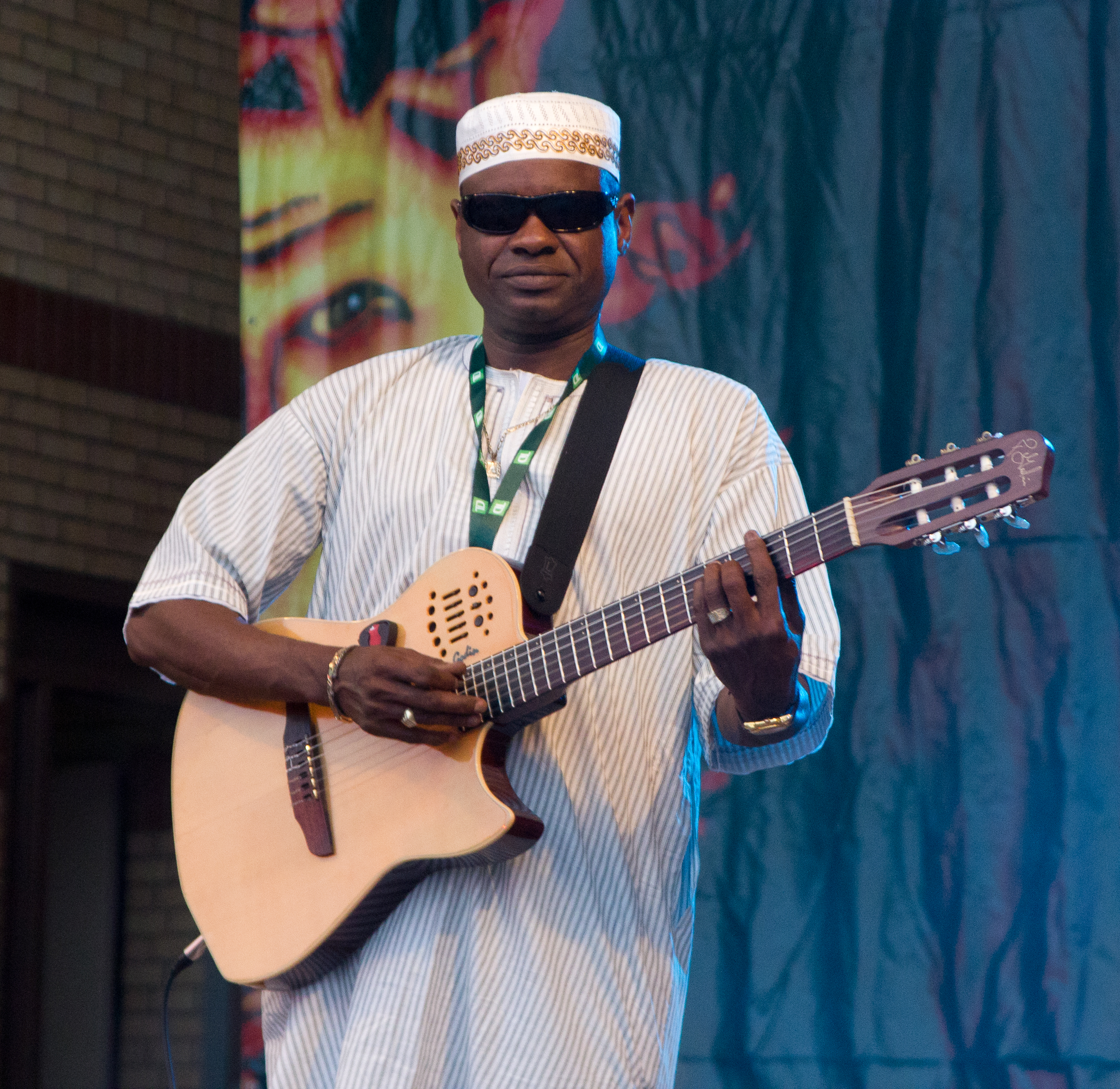

Background information
- Born: 1963 or 1964 (age 61–62); Conakry, Guinea
- Occupations: Musician, singer, songwriter
- Instruments: Vocals, guitar, balafon, djembe
- Years active: 1980s–present
- Label: Jericho Beach
- Website: alphayayadiallo.com

Alpha Yaya Diallo is a Guinean-born Canadian guitarist, singer and songwriter. He incorporates Guinea's rich musical tradition into his original compositions. Diallo has won two Juno Awards, shared a third, and was nominated another three times.

== Biography ==
Diallo was born in Conakry, the capital of Guinea. When he was young, he followed his father, a doctor who was in demand all around the country; this exposed him to a wide variety of cultural experiences, both from the different ethnic groups within Guinea itself and from neighbouring countries.

When Guinea gained its independence from France in 1958, its Marxist first president, Ahmed Sékou Touré, launched a cultural program aimed at the rediscovery and support of "Guinea's music, arts, dance and languages." Diallo recalled that, "At the time every family had a member who was being trained in music." He started playing percussion in school, but taught himself to play the guitar at an early age (either "probably six or seven" or 12, according to his inconsistent recollections). At the University of Conakry, he became the bandleader of the Sons of Rais and toured extensively with them throughout West Africa. After graduation, he performed with Love Systems, Kaloum Star and Sorsornet Rhythm.

Diallo moved to Europe in the mid-1980s, where he worked particularly with the Fatala group, which played traditional Guinean music and was associated with Peter Gabriel's music label. After extensive touring, Diallo settled down in Vancouver, British Columbia, Canada, in 1991. In 1993, he released his solo first album, Nene, which was nominated for a Juno Award, as was his 1996 album Futur. He won his first Juno, for The Message in 1999 in the "Best World Music Album" category, a second in 2002 for The Journey and shared a third in 2004 for the African Guitar Summit compilation. He released Djama in 2005. He won the Best World Artist-Solo at the inaugural Canadian Folk Music Awards in 2006. He plays with Ghanaian guitarist Pa Joe Diallo, Adam Solomo and Mighty Popo in African Guitar Summit. In addition to the guitar, he also plays the balafon and the djembe. His backup band, since 1992, is called Baffing.

He produced a film documentary entitled Best of Both Worlds, which was filmed in West Africa, Canada and France.

== Discography ==
- 1993: Néné (Bafing Productions) – nominated for a Juno Award
- 1996: Futur (Bafing Productions) – nominated for a Juno Award
- 1998: The Message (Bafing Productions) – won the Juno Award for Best Global Album
- 2001: The Journey (Jericho Beach Music) – won the Juno Award for Best Global Album
- 2004: African Guitar Summit (CBC Recordings) collaboration – won the Juno Award in Best World Music Album category
- 2005: Djama (Jericho Beach Music) – nominated for a Juno Award
- 2010: Immé (Jericho Beach Music)
