= Ramon Chicharron =

Alexander Betancur Osorio, known by the stage name Ramon Chicharron, is a Colombian-Canadian musician based in Montreal, Quebec.

A native of Medellín, he moved to Canada in 2004.

== Discography ==
- Uepaje - 2015
- Merecumbé - 2018, EP
- Pescador de sueños - 2020
- Destello de estrellas - 2022
- Niebla - 2024

== Awards ==
Association	Year	Category	Nominated work	Result	Ref.
Félix Awards	2021	Global Music Album of the Year	Pescador de sueños	Won	
Félix Awards	2023	Global Music Album of the Year	Destello de estrellas	Nominated	
Félix Awards	2025	Global Music Album of the Year	Niebla	Won	
Juno Awards	2025	Global Music Album of the Year	Niebla	Nominated	
