= Juno Awards of 1981 =

Canadian music awards ceremony

- Date: 5 February 1981
- Venue: O'Keefe Centre, Toronto, Ontario
- Hosted by: Multiple (see article)

Television/radio coverage
- Network: CBC

The Juno Awards of 1981, representing Canadian music industry achievements of the previous year, were awarded on 5 February 1981 in Toronto at a ceremony hosted by multiple co-presenters at the O'Keefe Centre. The first co-hosts were Andrea Martin and John Candy of SCTV fame, then Frank Mills and Ginette Reno, and finally Ronnie Hawkins and Carroll Baker.

Ceremonies were broadcast nationally on CBC Television from 7pm Eastern Time. More capacity was now available at the O'Keefe Centre and tickets were made available to the public at $15 each. The television show was seen by an estimated 1,880,000 viewers .

Juno awards organiser CARAS announced the major nominees 6 January 1981, with additional nominees in classical, jazz and album graphics announced 20 January 1981.

The Emeralds, previously nominated four times for the Country Group award, were not nominated this year. Controversy ensued when a committee declared to CARAS that the band was a polka band that should not be nominated in a country category. A reported attempt to file their nomination in a folk category was rejected due to a relative lack of sales. The Emeralds then looked to the courts to stop CARAS from issuing ballots that omitted their group. The group's legal challenge was unsuccessful, but the settlement required the Juno awards to mention the band and its previous nominations during the broadcast.

Performers during the broadcast included Frank Mills on piano with Ginette Reno singing "The Poet and I", Ronnie Hawkins and Carrol Baker singing "Hey, Bo Diddley", Graham Shaw singing his hit "Can I Come Near", and single songs each from Diane Tell, Shari Ulrich and the Powder Blues Band.

Although she received four awards, Anne Murray was once again absent from this year's show. Joni Mitchell's entry into the Canadian Music Hall of Fame was introduced by then Prime Minister Pierre Trudeau. During her acceptance speech, Mitchell quipped that she felt like hockey star Bernie "Boom Boom" Geoffrion for receiving this honour.

The "Single of the Year" award was a tie between Anne Murray and Martha and the Muffins, and is the only time a tie for this award has occurred in the history of the Juno's.

== Nominees and winners ==
=== Female Vocalist of the Year ===
Winner: Anne Murray

Other nominees:

- Carroll Baker
- Claudja Barry
- Susan Jacks
- Joni Mitchell

=== Male Vocalist of the Year ===
Winner: Bruce Cockburn

Other nominees:

- Burton Cummings
- Gordon Lightfoot
- Gino Vannelli
- Neil Young

=== Most Promising Female Vocalist of the Year ===
Winner: Carole Pope

Other nominees:

- Dianne Heatherington
- Michaele Jordana
- Shari Ulrich
- Laura Vinson

=== Most Promising Male Vocalist of the Year ===
Winner: Graham Shaw

Other nominees:

- Bryan Adams
- Long John Baldry
- B. B. Gabor
- Wayne Rostad

=== Group of the Year ===
Winner: Prism

Other nominees:

- April Wine
- Harlequin
- Max Webster
- Rush

=== Most Promising Group of the Year ===
Winner: Powder Blues Band

Other nominees:

- Loverboy
- Martha and the Muffins
- Red Rider
- Toronto

=== Composer of the Year ===
Winner: Eddie Schwartz, "Hit Me with Your Best Shot" by Pat Benatar

Other nominees:

- Doug Bennett, "Too Bad – The Move" by Doug and the Slugs
- Burton Cummings, "Fine State of Affairs"
- Mark Gane, "Echo Beach" by Martha and the Muffins
- Lindsay Mitchell, Allen Harlow, "Young and Restless" by Prism

=== Country Female Vocalist of the Year ===
Winner: Anne Murray

Other nominees:

- Carroll Baker
- Marie Bottrell
- Iris Larratt
- Laura Vinson

=== Country Male Vocalist of the Year ===
Winner: Eddie Eastman

Other nominees:

- Wilf Carter
- Dallas Harms
- Wayne Rostad
- Hank Snow

=== Country Group or Duo of the Year ===
Winner: The Good Brothers

Other nominees:

- Carlton Showband
- Family Brown
- R. Harlan Smith and Chris Nielsen
- 6 Cylinder

=== Folk Artist of the Year ===
Winner: Bruce Cockburn

Other nominees:

- Gordon Lightfoot
- Murray McLauchlan
- The Rovers
- Valdy

=== Instrumental Artist of the Year ===
Winner: Frank Mills

Other nominees:

- Liona Boyd
- Hagood Hardy
- Moe Koffman
- Claire Lawrence

=== Producer of the Year ===
Winner: Gene Martynec, "Tokyo" by Bruce Cockburn and "High School Confidential" by Rough Trade

Other nominees:

- Bruce Fairbairn, "Young & Restless" and "Satellite", Prism
- Claire Lawrence, "Long Nights" and "Bad, Bad Girl", Shari Ulrich
- Jack Richardson, "Battle Scar", Max Webster and "Heads Are Gonna Roll", Straight Lines
- George Semkiw, "Hot Spikes" and "What Am I To Do", Fist

=== Recording Engineer of the Year ===
Winner: Mike Jones, "Factory" and "We're OK", Instructions

Other nominees:

- Terry Brown, "Metropolitan Life", B. B. Gabor
- Gary Gray, "What About the Bond", Bruce Cockburn and "High School Confidential", Carole Pope and Rough Trade
- David Greene, "Battle Scar", Max Webster
- Gord Paton, "The Invisible Man" and "Oh No", Zero One

=== Canadian Music Hall of Fame ===
Winner: Joni Mitchell

== Nominated and winning albums ==
=== Album of the Year ===
Winner: Greatest Hits, Anne Murray

Other nominees:

- Permanent Waves, Rush
- Uncut, Powder Blues
- Woman Love, Burton Cummings
- Young and Restless, Prism

=== Best Album Graphics ===
Winner: Jeanette Hanna, We Deliver by Downchild Blues Band

Other nominees:

- Doug Bennett, Cognac and Bologna by Doug and the Slugs
- Dean Motter, Loverboy (self-titled)
- James O'Mara, Straight Lines (self-titled)
- Hugh Syme, Michael Gray, Lookin' for Trouble by Toronto

=== Best Children's Album ===
Winner: Singing 'n' Swinging, Sharon, Lois & Bram

Other nominees:

- The Cat Came Back, Fred Penner
- Listen To Me, Jim & Rosalie
- Merry-Go-Round, The Travellers
- You've Got To Be A Kid To Get In, The Free Rose Corporation

=== Best Classical Album of the Year ===
Winner: Stravinsky – Chopin Ballads, Arthur Ozolins

Other nominees:

- Bach Toccatas, Vol 2, Glenn Gould
- The Village Band, Canadian Brass
- Orford String Quartet, Orford String Quartet
- François Dompierre, François Dompierre

=== International Album of the Year ===
Winner: The Wall, Pink Floyd

Other nominees:

- Against the Wind, Bob Seger
- Glass Houses, Billy Joel
- Greatest Hits, Kenny Rogers
- The Game, Queen

=== Best Jazz Album ===
Winner: Present Perfect, Rob McConnell & The Boss Brass

Other nominees:

- The Book of the Heart, Glen Hall
- Circles, Don Thompson
- Entre Amis, Bob Stroup
- Live in Jazz City, Bob Stroup
- Tommy Ambrose at Last, Tommy Ambrose with the Doug Riley Band

== Nominated and winning releases ==
=== Single of the Year ===
Winner (tie):

- "Could I Have this Dance", Anne Murray
- "Echo Beach", Martha and the Muffins

Other nominees:

- "Fine State of Affairs", Burton Cummings
- "Too Bad – The Move", Doug and the Slugs
- "Wasn't That a Party", The Rovers

=== International Single of the Year ===
Winner: "Another Brick in the Wall (Part 2)", Pink Floyd

Other nominees:

- "Another One Bites the Dust", Queen
- "Funkytown", Lipps Inc.
- "It's Still Rock and Roll to Me", Billy Joel
- "Rapper's Delight", Sugar Hill Gang

== Bibliography ==
- Krewen, Nick. (2010). Music from far and wide: Celebrating 40 years of the Juno Awards. Key Porter Books Limited, Toronto. ISBN 978-1-55470-339-5
