= Juno Awards of 1983 =

Canadian music awards ceremony

- Date: 5 April 1983
- Venue: Harbour Castle Hilton, Toronto, Ontario
- Hosted by: Burton Cummings, Alan Thicke

Television/radio coverage
- Network: CBC

The Juno Awards of 1983, representing Canadian music industry achievements of the previous year, were awarded on 5 April 1983 in Toronto at a ceremony hosted by Burton Cummings and Alan Thicke at the Harbour Castle Hilton in the Metropolitan Ballroom.

Western Canadian artists have proven to be a major force in the music industry in the 1980s with 1983 Juno winners such as Bryan Adams, Loverboy and the Payola$.

== Awards ceremony ==
The Juno ceremonies were broadcast as a two-hour special on CBC Television from 7pm Eastern Time. Interest in the telecast was growing substantially, with 3.2 million viewers in 1982, and 4.4 million for this year's edition.

During their opening co-hosts Cummings and Thicke introduced the Compact Disc to the viewing audience, likely the first introduction to the new media for many people. Columbia Records had just released their first ever batch of titles on CD about one month before the broadcast. As Cummings recalled: "Alan held up Toto IV, and it was also the first time I held one in my hand. I don't think Alan had seen one before that night... It felt like 'show and tell' and it was pretty cool for that to happen on national TV."

Payola$ were the top band this year with three awards including "Most Promising Group" and "Best Selling Single" for "Eyes of a Stranger". Bob Rock was absent (ironically he was mixing Loverboy's next album) and so band-mate Paul Hyde accepted their awards. For the "Most Promising Group" award he remarked "Somebody told us that to get this award is the kiss-off. Nobody's going to kiss us off."

Loverboy continued their winning streak by taking both the "Group of the Year" and "Album of the Year" awards for the second year in a row, this time for their sophomore effort Get Lucky. Other repeat winners for the same awards from the 1982 Juno's included Liona Boyd, Anne Murray and The Good Brothers.

British-Canadian musician Bryan Adams won his first ever Juno award but was unable to accept it in person as he was touring in the U.S., so his manager Bruce Allen accepted it on his behalf.

The "Canadian Music Hall of Fame" award was posthumously given to Glenn Gould who had died the previous year. Gould's award was presented by then Governor General Edward Schreyer and accepted by Gould's former manager John Roberts. Gould was also nominated twice in the same category for "Best Classical Album" and won this award for his 1981 re-recording of Bach: The Goldberg Variations.

== Nominees and winners ==
Similar to the 1981 Juno's, the category for "Best Comedy Album" was not awarded this year.

=== Female Vocalist of the Year ===
Winner: Carole Pope

Other nominees:

- Jessie Burns
- Joni Mitchell
- Anne Murray
- Shari Ulrich

=== Male Vocalist of the Year ===
Winner: Bryan Adams

Other nominees:

- Burton Cummings
- Gordon Lightfoot
- Murray McLauchlan
- Aldo Nova

=== Most Promising Female Vocalist of the Year ===
Winner: Lydia Taylor

Other nominees:

- Lee Aaron
- Terry Crawford
- Luba
- Mary Lu Zahalan

=== Most Promising Male Vocalist of the Year ===
Winner: Kim Mitchell

Other nominees:

- Lawrence Gowan
- David Roberts
- Leroy Sibbles
- David Wilcox

=== Group of the Year ===
Winner: Loverboy

Other nominees:

- April Wine
- Chilliwack
- Rush
- Saga

=== Most Promising Group of the Year ===
Winner: Payola$

Other nominees:

- Doug and the Slugs
- Headpins
- The Spoons
- Strange Advance

=== Composer of the Year ===
Winner: Bob Rock and Paul Hyde, "Eyes of a Stranger" by the Payolas

Other nominees:

- Robert Buckley and David Sinclair, "Letting Go" by Straight Lines
- Paul Dean and Mike Reno, "Working for the Weekend" by Loverboy
- Geoff Iwamoto and Michael Roth, "Your Daddy Don't Know" by Toronto
- Neil Peart, "New World Man" by Rush

=== Country Female Vocalist of the Year ===
Winner: Anne Murray

Other nominees:

- Carroll Baker
- Marie Bottrell
- Cathy Chambers
- Laura Vinson

=== Country Male Vocalist of the Year ===
Winner: Eddie Eastman

Other nominees:

- Harold MacIntyre
- Lee Marlow
- Paul Weber
- Diamond Joe White

=== Country Group or Duo of the Year ===
Winner: The Good Brothers

Other nominees:

- Family Brown
- Garry Lee and Showdown
- Midnite Rodeo Band
- The Rovers

=== Instrumental Artist of the Year ===
Winner: Liona Boyd

Other nominees:

- All-Star Swing Band
- The Emeralds
- Frank Mills
- The Spitfire Band

=== Producer of the Year ===
Winner: Bill Henderson and Brian MacLeod, "Whatcha Gonna Do" and "Secret Information" by Chilliwack

Other nominees:

- Terry Brown, "Subdivisions" & "Chemistry" by Rush
- Bruce Fairbairn, "Worlds Away" & "She Controls Me" by Strange Advance
- Claire Lawrence, "You're Makin Me Nervous" & "The One and Only" by Shari Ulrich
- Peter Mann, "That Kind of Man" & "Prince of Darkness" by The Nylons

=== Recording Engineer of the Year ===
Winner: Bob Rock, No Stranger to Danger by the Payola$

Other nominees:

- Gary Gray, Shaking the Foundations by Rough Trade
- Lindsay Kidd / Bob Rock, Worlds Away by Strange Advance
- Dave Slagter, Opus X by Chilliwack
- Paul Northfield, Power Play by April Wine

=== Canadian Music Hall of Fame ===
Winner: Glenn Gould (posthumous)

== Nominated and winning albums ==
=== Album of the Year ===
Winner: Get Lucky, Loverboy

Other nominees:

- Aldo Nova, Aldo Nova
- Christmas Wishes, Anne Murray
- Signals, Rush
- Turn it Loud, Headpins

=== Best Album Graphics ===
Winner: Dean Motter, Metal on Metal by Anvil

Other nominees:

- Tom Powell, Streetheart by Streetheart
- Hugh Syme, One False Move by Harlequin
- Hugh Syme, Signals by Rush
- Scott Thornley, Rise and Shine by Raffi

=== Best Children's Album ===
Winner: When You Dream a Dream, Bob Schneider

Other nominees:

- Jim and Rosalie... At the Music Factory, Jim and Rosalie
- Junior Jug Band, Chris Whiteley and Ken Whiteley
- Valdy's Kids' Record, Valdy
- Wake Up Mr Dressup!, Ernie Coombs

=== Best Classical Album of the Year ===
Winner: Bach: The Goldberg Variations, Glenn Gould (1981 re-recording)

Other nominees:

- Haydn: The Six Last Sonatas - Glenn Gould
- Ravel: Bolero, La Valse, Rapsodie Espagnole, Alborada Del Gracioso - Montreal Symphony Orchestra Conducted by Charles Dutoit
- Stravinsky: The Firebird 1910 Version - Toronto Symphony Orchestra Conducted by Kazuyoshi Akiyama
- Strauss: Till Eulenspiegel, Salome's Dance, Death and Transfiguration - Vancouver Symphony Orchestra Conducted by Kazuyoshi Akiyama

=== International Album of the Year ===
Winner: Business As Usual, Men at Work

Other nominees:

- 4, Foreigner
- Freeze Frame, The J. Geils Band
- Hooked on Classics, Louis Clark & Royal Philharmonic Orchestra
- Physical, Olivia Newton-John

=== Best Jazz Album ===
Winner: I Didn't Know About You, Fraser MacPherson and Oliver Gannon

Other nominees:

- Bells - Don Thompson and Rob Piltch
- Blues Tales in Time - Paul Cram
- Sometime in Another Life - Peter Leitch and George McFetridge
- Time Warp - Time Warp

== Nominated and winning releases ==
=== Best Selling Single ===
Winner: "Eyes of a Stranger", Payolas

Other nominees:

- "Letting Go", Straight Lines
- "New World Man", Rush
- "Working for the Weekend", Loverboy
- "Your Daddy Don't Know", Toronto

=== International Single of the Year ===
Winner: "Eye of the Tiger", Survivor

Other nominees:

- "Abracadabra", Steve Miller Band
- "Da Da Da", Trio
- "I Love Rock 'n' Roll", Joan Jett and the Blackhearts
- "Physical", Olivia Newton-John

== Bibliography ==
- Krewen, Nick. (2010). Music from far and wide: Celebrating 40 years of the Juno Awards. Key Porter Books Limited, Toronto. ISBN 978-1-55470-339-5
