= Juno Award for Artist of the Year =

Category of Canadian music award

The Juno Award for Artist of the Year is an annual award presented by the Canadian Academy of Recording Arts and Sciences (CARAS) to the best individual musician in Canada. The five nominees in the category are decided through a combination of sales and CARAS member voting, and the recipient is chosen from among these nominees by member voting.

Prior to 2003, male and female artists were nominated and awarded in separate categories. The award was also known as Best Male Artist and Best Female Artist (2000–2002), Best Male Vocalist and Best Female Vocalist (1970–1974, 1999), and Male Vocalist of the Year and Female Vocalist of the Year (1975–1998).

== Achievements ==
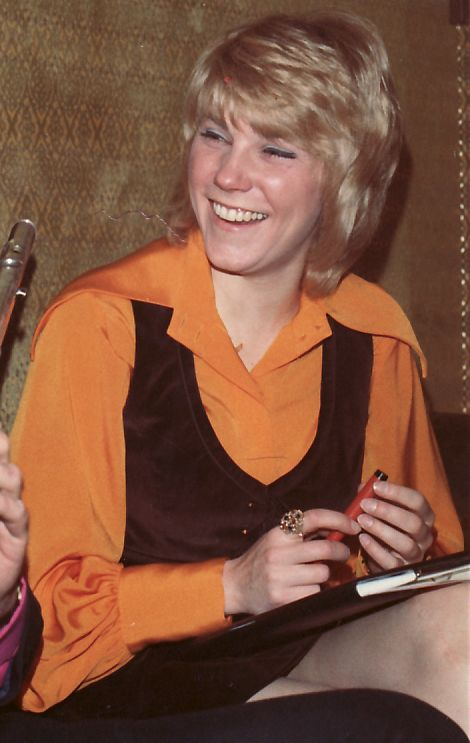
Anne Murray in the 1970s.

With nine wins and 20 nominations, Nova Scotian singer Anne Murray is both the most awarded and most nominated artist in this category, and was also nominated for a record twelve years in a row, from 1979 to 1991 (excluding 1988, when no ceremony was held). Rock musician Bryan Adams is the male with the most wins in the category, with seven, including a record five wins in a row from 1983 to 1987. Neil Young is the most nominated male with 14 total nominations, and is also remarkable for the 32 years between his first nomination in 1979 and his most recent win in 2011.

Maestro Fresh-Wes was the first hip-hop/rap artist to be nominated for the award in 1992, and deadmau5 was the first electronica artist to be nominated in 2012.

== Recipients ==
=== Outstanding Performance (1972–1973) ===
In 1972 and 1973 only, awards were given for Outstanding Performance of the Year – Female and Outstanding Performance of the Year – Male in addition to those for Best Male Vocalist and Best Female Vocalist.

Year	Outstanding Performance of the Year – Male	Outstanding Performance of the Year – Female	Refs.
1972	Joey Gregorash	Ginette Reno	
1973	Bob McBride	Ginette Reno	

=== Male and Female Vocalists of the Year (1970–1998) ===
Year	Best Male Vocalist		Best Female Vocalist		Refs.
Year	Winner	Nominees	Winner	Nominees	Refs.
1970	Andy Kim	—	Ginette Reno	—	
1971	Gordon Lightfoot	Andy Kim; Pierre Lalonde; Gene MacLellan; Tom Northcott	Anne Murray	Susan Jacks; Debbie Lori Kaye; Joni Mitchell; Ginette Reno	
1972	Gordon Lightfoot	—	Anne Murray	—	
1973	Gordon Lightfoot	—	Anne Murray	—	
1974	Terry Jacks	Keith Hampshire; Gordon Lightfoot; Bob McBride; Murray McLauchlan	Anne Murray	Shirley Eikhard; Patsy Gallant; Susan Jacks; Ginette Reno	
1975	Gordon Lightfoot	Michel Pagliaro; Paul Anka; Stompin' Tom Connors; Terry Jacks	Anne Murray	Alexis Rose Radlin; Cathy Young; Patsy Gallant; Susan Jacks	
1976	Gino Vannelli	Gordon Lightfoot; Jean-Pierre Ferland; Murray McLauchlan; Paul Anka	Joni Mitchell	Anne Murray; Charity Brown; Suzanne Stevens; Sylvia Tyson	
1977	Burton Cummings	Gino Vannelli; Gordon Lightfoot; Paul Anka; Valdy	Patsy Gallant	Anne Murray; Carroll Baker; Charity Brown; Joni Mitchell	
1978	Dan Hill	Burton Cummings; Gino Vannelli; Gordon Lightfoot; Valdy	Patsy Gallant	Carroll Baker; Charity Brown; Claudja Barry; Joni Mitchell	
1979	Gino Vannelli	Burton Cummings; Dan Hill; Gordon Lightfoot; Neil Young	Anne Murray	Carroll Baker; Joni Mitchell; Lisa Dal Bello; Patsy Gallant	
1980	Burton Cummings	Bruce Cockburn; Gino Vannelli; Murray McLauchlan; Neil Young	Anne Murray	Carroll Baker; Claudja Barry; Joni Mitchell; Lisa Dal Bello	
1981	Bruce Cockburn	Burton Cummings; Gino Vannelli; Gordon Lightfoot; Neil Young	Anne Murray	Carroll Baker; Claudja Barry; Joni Mitchell; Susan Jacks	
1982	Bruce Cockburn	Burton Cummings; Gino Vannelli; Gordon Lightfoot; Neil Young	Anne Murray	Carole Pope; Carroll Baker; Joni Mitchell; Lisa Dal Bello	
1983	Bryan Adams	Aldo Nova; Burton Cummings; Gordon Lightfoot; Murray McLauchlan	Carole Pope	Anne Murray; Jessie Burns; Joni Mitchell; Shari Ulrich	
1984	Bryan Adams	Bruce Cockburn; Corey Hart; Gordon Lightfoot; Stan Rogers	Carole Pope	Anne Murray; Dalbello; Holly Woods; Shari Ulrich	
1985	Bryan Adams	Bruce Cockburn; Corey Hart; Gowan; Kim Mitchell	Luba	Anne Murray; Carole Pope; Dalbello; Lee Aaron	
1986	Bryan Adams	Bruce Cockburn; Gino Vannelli; Kim Mitchell; Neil Young	Luba	Anne Murray; Carroll Baker; Jane Siberry; Martine St. Clair	
1987	Bryan Adams	Corey Hart; Gino Vannelli; Gowan; Kim Mitchell	Luba	Anne Murray; k.d. lang; Lee Aaron; Véronique Béliveau	
No award ceremony was held in 1988
1989	Robbie Robertson	Bruce Cockburn; David Wilcox; Leonard Cohen; Neil Young	k.d. lang	Anne Murray; Celine Dion; Johanne Blouin; Rita MacNeil	
1990	Kim Mitchell	Bruce Cockburn; David Wilcox; George Fox; Neil Young	Rita MacNeil	Anne Murray; Candy Pennella; Lee Aaron; Sass Jordan	
1991	Colin James	Gowan; Maestro Fresh-Wes; Neil Young; Paul Janz	Celine Dion	Anne Murray; Candy Pennella; Lee Aaron; Rita MacNeil	
1992	Tom Cochrane	Bryan Adams; Bruce Cockburn; Maestro Fresh-Wes; Robbie Robertson	Celine Dion	Lee Aaron; Loreena McKennitt; Mitsou; Sarah McLachlan	
1993	Leonard Cohen	Corey Hart; Francis Martin; Kim Mitchell; Neil Young	Celine Dion	k.d. lang; Michelle Wright; Rita MacNeil; Sass Jordan	
1994	Roch Voisine	Daniel Lanois; John McDermott; Snow; Stef Carse	Celine Dion	Alannah Myles; Anne Murray; Rita MacNeil; Sarah McLachlan	
1995	Neil Young	Bruce Cockburn; Colin James; John McDermott; Roch Voisine	Jann Arden	Julie Masse; Loreena McKennitt; Michelle Wright; Sass Jordan	
1996	Colin James	Charlie Major; Mario Pelchat; Neil Young; Tom Cochrane	Alanis Morissette	Celine Dion; Rita MacNeil; Shania Twain; Susan Aglukark	
1997	Bryan Adams	Corey Hart; John McDermott; Neil Young; Paul Brandt	Celine Dion	Alannah Myles; Amanda Marshall; Deborah Cox; Lara Fabian	
1998	Paul Brandt	Bruce Cockburn; Bruno Pelletier; John McDermott; Roch Voisine	Sarah McLachlan	Jann Arden; Loreena McKennitt; Shania Twain; Terri Clark	

=== Best Male Vocalist and Best Female Vocalist (1999) ===
Year	Best Male Vocalist		Best Female Vocalist		Refs.
Year	Winner	Nominees	Winner	Nominees	Refs.
1999	Jim Cuddy	Colin James; Corey Hart; David Usher; Kevin Parent	Celine Dion	Deborah Cox; Ginette Reno; Holly Cole; Lynda Lemay	

=== Best Male and Female Artists (2000–2001) ===
Year	Best Male Artist		Best Female Artist		Refs.
Year	Winner	Nominees	Winner	Nominees	Refs.
2000	Bryan Adams	Paul Brandt; Choclair; Tom Cochrane; Edwin	Chantal Kreviazuk	Alanis Morissette; Amanda Marshall; Celine Dion; Lynda Lemay	
2001	Neil Young	Nicola Ciccone; Jesse Cook; Sylvain Cossette; Snow	Jann Arden	Isabelle Boulay; Lara Fabian; Lynda Lemay; Terri Clark	

=== Best Artist (2002) ===
Year	Best Artist	Nominees	Ref.
2002	Diana Krall	Amanda Marshall; Garou; Leonard Cohen; Nelly Furtado	

=== Artist of the Year (2003–present) ===
Year	Artist of the Year	Nominees	Ref.
2003	Shania Twain	Alanis Morissette; Celine Dion; Daniel Bélanger; Remy Shand	
2004	Sam Roberts	Celine Dion; Nelly Furtado; Sarah McLachlan; Shawn Desman	
2005	Avril Lavigne	Bryan Adams; Celine Dion; Diana Krall; k.d. lang	
2006	Michael Bublé	Boom Desjardins; Diana Krall; Kalan Porter; Rex Goudie	
2007	Nelly Furtado	Diana Krall; Gregory Charles; Loreena McKennitt; Pierre Lapointe	
2008	Feist	Avril Lavigne; Celine Dion; Michael Bublé; Pascale Picard	
2009	Sam Roberts	Bryan Adams; City and Colour; k.d. lang; Serena Ryder	
2010	K'naan	Diana Krall; Jann Arden; Johnny Reid; Michael Bublé	
2011	Neil Young	Drake; Johnny Reid; Justin Bieber; Sarah McLachlan	
2012	Feist	City and Colour; deadmau5; Drake; Michael Bublé	
2013	Leonard Cohen	Justin Bieber; deadmau5; Carly Rae Jepsen; Johnny Reid	
2014	Serena Ryder	Céline Dion; Drake; Michael Bublé; Robin Thicke	
2015	The Weeknd	Bryan Adams; deadmau5; Leonard Cohen; Sarah McLachlan	
2016	The Weeknd	City and Colour; Shawn Mendes; Drake; Justin Bieber	
2017	Leonard Cohen	Alessia Cara; Drake; Shawn Mendes; The Weeknd	
2018	Gord Downie	Daniel Caesar; Lights; Ruth B; Shania Twain	
2019	Shawn Mendes	Michael Bublé; Alessia Cara; The Weeknd; Tory Lanez	
2020	Shawn Mendes	Bryan Adams; Alessia Cara; Tory Lanez; Jessie Reyez	
2021	The Weeknd	Ali Gatie; Céline Dion; Jessie Reyez; Justin Bieber	
2022	Charlotte Cardin	Justin Bieber; Shawn Mendes; JP Saxe; The Weeknd	
2023	The Weeknd	Michael Bublé; Avril Lavigne; Shawn Mendes; Lauren Spencer-Smith	
2024	Tate McRae	Charlotte Cardin; Daniel Caesar; Lauren Spencer-Smith; Shania Twain	
2025	Tate McRae	Kaytranada; Shawn Mendes; Josh Ross; The Weeknd	
2026	Tate McRae	bbno$; Justin Bieber; Daniel Caesar; The Weeknd	

== See also ==
- List of Canadian musicians
