= Juno Awards of 1977 =

Canadian music awards ceremony

- Date: 16 March 1977
- Venue: Royal York Hotel, Toronto, Ontario
- Hosted by: David Steinberg

Television/radio coverage
- Network: CBC

The Juno Awards of 1977, representing Canadian music industry achievements of the previous year, were awarded on 16 March 1977 in Toronto at a ceremony hosted by David Steinberg at the Royal York Hotel. The ceremonies were broadcast on a 2-hour CBC Television special.

Classical and jazz categories were introduced this year.

== Nominees and winners ==
Male Vocalist of the Year	Female Vocalist of the Year
Burton Cummings; Paul Anka; Gordon Lightfoot; Valdy; Gino Vannelli	Patsy Gallant; Carroll Baker; Charity Brown; Joni Mitchell; Anne Murray
Most Promising Male Vocalist	Most Promising Female Vocalist
Burton Cummings; Roger Doucet; Danny Hooper; Nestor Pistor; Wayne St. John	Colleen Peterson; Gail Dahms; Denise McCann; Patricia Anne McKinnon; Chris Nielsen
Country Male Vocalist of the Year	Country Female Vocalist of the Year
Murray McLauchlan; Wilf Carter; Stompin' Tom Connors; R. Harlan Smith; Ted Wesley	Carroll Baker; Marilyn Jones; Anne Murray; Chris Nielsen; Colleen Peterson
Group of the Year	Most Promising Group of the Year
Heart; April Wine; Bachman–Turner Overdrive; Rush; The Stampeders	THP Orchestra; Garfield; Moxy; Sweeney Todd; Trooper
Country Group or Duo of the Year	Folk Singer of the Year
The Good Brothers; Canadian Zephyr; Carlton Showband; The Emeralds; The Mercey Brothers	Gordon Lightfoot; Stompin' Tom Connors; Dan Hill; Murray McLauchlan; Valdy
Instrumental Artist of the Year	Composer of the Year
Hagood Hardy; Black Light Orchestra; Al Cherney; François Dompierre; André Gagnon	Gordon Lightfoot, "The Wreck of the Edmund Fitzgerald"; Paul Anka, "Happier"; Burton Cummings, "Stand Tall"; André Gagnon, "Wow"; André Gagnon, "Surprise"; Nick Gilder and Jim McCulloch, "Roxy Roller"; Hagood Hardy, "The Homecoming"; Ra McGuire, "Two for the Show"; Gene Williams and Gilles Vigneault, "From New York to L.A."
Producer of the Year	Recording Engineer of the Year
Mike Flicker, "Dreamboat Annie" (Heart)	Paul Pagé, Are You Ready for Love by Patsy Gallant

== Nominated and winning albums ==
=== Best Selling Album ===
Winner: Neiges, André Gagnon

=== Best Album Graphics ===
Winner: Michael Bownes], Ian Tamblyn by Ian Tamblyn

=== Best Classical Album of the Year ===
Winner: Beethoven - Vols. 1,2,&3, Anton Kuerti

Other nominees:

- Franck and Ravel, Hidetaro Suzuki & Zeyda Ruga-Suzuki
- Franz Schubert & Johannes Brahms, Gisela Depkat
- Liona, Liona Boyd
- Plays J.S. Bach, Pierre Grandmaison

=== Best Selling International Album ===
Winner: Frampton Comes Alive, Peter Frampton

=== Best Jazz Album ===
Winner: The Atlantic Suite, Phil Nimmons - Nimmons 'N Nine Plus Six

- Jingle Man — Moe Koffman
- Travelin' On — Oscar Peterson
- The Jazz Album — Rob McConnell and the Boss Brass
- Nowhere But Here — Joel Shulman

== Nominated and winning releases ==
=== Best Selling Single ===
Winner: "Roxy Roller", Sweeney Todd

- André Gagnon, "Wow"
- Patsy Gallant, "From New York to L.A."
- THP Orchestra, "Theme from S.W.A.T."

=== Best Selling International Single ===
Winner: "I Love to Love", Tina Charles
