= Juno Award for Group of the Year =

Canadian music award

The Juno Award for Group of the Year has been awarded annually since 1970 in recognition of the best musical group or band in Canada. It is presented by the Canadian Academy of Recording Arts and Sciences (CARAS). The five nominees in the category are decided through a combination of sales and CARAS member voting, and the recipient is chosen from among these nominees by member voting.

The award was previously named as Top Vocal Instrumental Group (1970–1971), Vocal Instrumental Group of the Year (1972–1973), and Best Group (1999–2002). In 1972 and 1973, awards were also given for Outstanding Performance of the Year – Group.

== Achievements ==
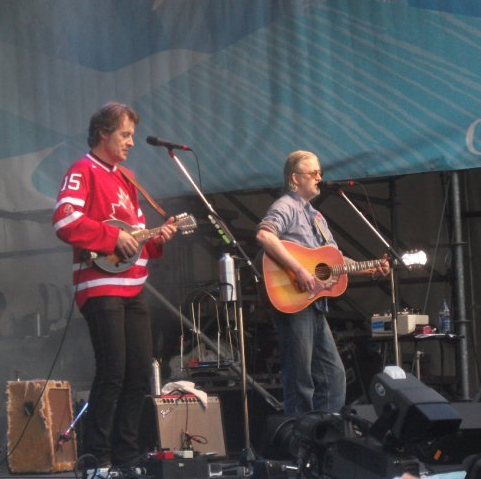
Jim Cuddy (left) and Greg Keelor (right), members of Blue Rodeo, the winner of the award in 1989, 1990, 1991, 1996 and 2008.

With six wins, the alternative rock band Arkells is the most winning group in the category. Four groups are tied for the most consecutive wins, three each: in chronological order Loverboy, Blue Rodeo, Arkells, and The Beaches.

Country rock band Blue Rodeo's 13 total nominations is slightly edged out by the 14 garnered by hard rock and progressive rock band Rush, including a record eight consecutive nominations from 1977 to 1984. The record for the most nominations without ever winning is held by April Wine, who were nominated 8 times from 1975 to 1983.

Country and folk group The Rankin Family, winners in 1994, are the first non-rock group to ever win the award. The next were electronic dance music groups A Tribe Called Red in 2018 and Loud Luxury in 2020. Though several French-language groups have been nominated, none has ever won the award.

In 2014, Tegan and Sara became the first all-female band and the first duo to win this award.

== Recipients ==
=== Top Vocal Instrumental Group (1970–1971) ===
Year	Winner	Ref.
1970	The Guess Who	
1971	The Guess Who	

=== Vocal Instrumental Group of the Year and Outstanding Performance of the Year – Group (1972–1973) ===
In 1972 and 1973, two awards were given for group of the year and outstanding performance by a group.

Year	Vocal Instrumental Group of the Year	Outstanding Performance of the Year – Group	Refs.
1972	The Stampeders	Lighthouse	
1973	Lighthouse	Edward Bear	

=== Group of the Year (1974–1998) ===
Year	Winner	Nominees	Ref.
1974	Lighthouse	Gary & Dave; The Guess Who; The Stampeders	
1975	Bachman–Turner Overdrive	April Wine; Lighthouse; The Guess Who; The Stampeders	
1976	Bachman–Turner Overdrive	April Wine; Beau Dommage; Harmonium; The Stampeders	
1977	Heart	April Wine; Bachman–Turner Overdrive; Rush; The Stampeders	
1978	Rush	April Wine; Bachman–Turner Overdrive; The Stampeders; Trooper	
1979	Rush	Chilliwack; Prism; Triumph; Trooper	
1980	Trooper	April Wine; Max Webster; Prism; Rush	
1981	Prism	April Wine; Harlequin; Max Webster; Rush	
1982	Loverboy	April Wine; Prism; Rush; The Rovers	
1983	Loverboy	April Wine; Chilliwack; Rush; Saga	
1984	Loverboy	Chilliwack; Payola$; Red Rider; Rush	
1985	The Parachute Club	Helix; Honeymoon Suite; Strange Advance; Triumph	
1986	Honeymoon Suite	Loverboy; Platinum Blonde; Rush; Triumph	
1987	Tom Cochrane and Red Rider	The Parachute Club; Rock and Hyde; The Box; Triumph	
No award ceremony was held in 1988
1989	Blue Rodeo	Glass Tiger; Honeymoon Suite; Rush; Tom Cochrane and Red Rider	
1990	Blue Rodeo	Cowboy Junkies; Rush; The Jeff Healey Band; Tom Cochrane and Red Rider	
1991	Blue Rodeo	Cowboy Junkies; Rush; The Jeff Healey Band; The Northern Pikes	
1992	Crash Test Dummies	Blue Rodeo; Glass Tiger; Rush; The Tragically Hip	
1993	Barenaked Ladies	54-40; Blue Rodeo; Les B.B.; The Tragically Hip	
1994	The Rankin Family	Blue Rodeo; Moxy Früvous; Rush; The Jeff Healey Band	
1995	The Tragically Hip	Barenaked Ladies; Crash Test Dummies; Spirit of the West; The Watchmen	
1996	Blue Rodeo	Headstones; Odds; The Rankin Family; The Tea Party	
1997	The Tragically Hip	54-40; I Mother Earth; Moist; Noir Silence	
1998	Our Lady Peace	Big Sugar; Blue Rodeo; Great Big Sea; The Tea Party	

=== Best Group (1999–2002) ===
Year	Winner	Nominees	Ref.
1999	Barenaked Ladies	Matthew Good Band; Philosopher Kings; The Rankins; The Tragically Hip	
2000	Matthew Good Band	La Chicane; Moist; Our Lady Peace; The Tea Party	
2001	Barenaked Ladies	Blue Rodeo; soulDecision; The Moffatts; The Tragically Hip	
2002	Nickelback	Matthew Good Band; Our Lady Peace; Sum 41; The Tea Party	

=== Group of the Year (2003–present) ===
Year	Winner	Nominees	Ref.
2003	Sum 41	Blue Rodeo; Our Lady Peace; Swollen Members; The Tragically Hip	
2004	Nickelback	Barenaked Ladies; Finger Eleven; La Chicane; Our Lady Peace	
2005	Billy Talent	Great Big Sea; Simple Plan; Sum 41; The Tragically Hip	
2006	Nickelback	Barenaked Ladies; Blue Rodeo; Our Lady Peace; Theory of a Deadman	
2007	Billy Talent	Alexisonfire; Hedley; The Tragically Hip; Three Days Grace	
2008	Blue Rodeo	Arcade Fire; Finger Eleven; Hedley; Kaïn	
2009	Nickelback	Great Big Sea; Simple Plan; The Trews; Tokyo Police Club	
2010	Metric	Billy Talent; Blue Rodeo; Hedley; The Tragically Hip	
2011	Arcade Fire	Broken Social Scene; Down With Webster; Great Big Sea; Three Days Grace	
2012	Arkells	Down With Webster; Hedley; Nickelback; Sam Roberts Band	
2013	Marianas Trench	Billy Talent; Metric; Rush; The Sheepdogs	
2014	Tegan and Sara	Arcade Fire; Blue Rodeo; Hedley; Walk Off the Earth	
2015	Arkells	Chromeo; Mother Mother; Nickelback; You+Me	
2016	Walk Off the Earth	Hedley; Marianas Trench; Metric; Three Days Grace	
2017	The Tragically Hip	Arkells; Billy Talent; Tegan and Sara; The Strumbellas	
2018	A Tribe Called Red	Alvvays; Arcade Fire; Broken Social Scene; ~~Hedley~~ - nomination withdrawn	
2019	Arkells	Chromeo; Metric; The Sheepdogs; Three Days Grace	
2020	Loud Luxury	88Glam; Elijah Woods x Jamie Fine; The Reklaws; Walk Off the Earth	
2021	Arkells	Half Moon Run; Loud Luxury; The Glorious Sons; The Reklaws	
2022	Arkells	Loud Luxury; Mother Mother; The Reklaws; Valley	
2023	Arkells	Arcade Fire; Billy Talent; Metric; The Reklaws	
2024	The Beaches	Arkells; Loud Luxury; Nickelback; Walk Off the Earth	
2025	The Beaches	Crash Adams; Mother Mother; Spiritbox; Sum 41	
2026	The Beaches	Arcade Fire; Mother Mother; Peach Pit; Three Days Grace	

== See also ==
- List of bands from Canada
- Music of Canada
