= Juno Awards of 1971 =

Canadian music awards ceremony

- Date: 22 February 1971
- Venue: St. Lawrence Hall, Toronto, Ontario
- Hosted by: George Wilson

The Juno Awards of 1971 (Juno Award), representing Canadian music industry achievements of the previous year, were awarded on 22 February 1971 in Toronto at a ceremony in the St. Lawrence Hall. These would be the first awards to be formally titled the Junos as decided by RPM Magazine in 1970 following its first formal music awards event. George Wilson of CFRB radio was master of ceremonies for the awards for the second consecutive year.

Atlantic Canadians were particularly successful at the awards in 1971, most notably producer Brian Ahern and artists Stompin' Tom Connors, Gene MacLellan and Anne Murray, prompting Murray to quip to the audience about the emergence of a "Maritime Mafia" in the Canadian music scene. Connors would go on to win several more Junos before returning them in protest of the awards honoring Canadian musicians who primarily make their career outside of Canada.

== Nominated and winning people ==
=== Best Female Vocalist ===
Winner: Anne Murray

Other nominees:

- Susan Jacks
- Debbie Lori Kaye
- Joni Mitchell
- Ginette Reno

=== Best Male Vocalist ===
Winner: Gordon Lightfoot

Other nominees:

- Andy Kim
- Pierre Lalonde
- Gene MacLellan
- Tom Northcott

=== Best Group ===
Winner: The Guess Who

Other nominees:

- Edward Bear
- Lighthouse
- Mashmakhan
- The Poppy Family

=== Best Songwriter ===
Winner: Gene MacLellan (Special Award: Canadian Composer)

=== Best Country Female Artist ===
Winner: Myrna Lorrie

Other nominees:

- Debbie Lori Kaye
- Dianne Leigh
- Julie Lynn
- Donna Ramsay

=== Best Country Male Artist ===
Winner: Stompin' Tom Connors

Other nominees:

- Gary Buck
- Dick Damron
- Tommy Hunter
- Hank Smith

=== Best Country Group or Duo ===
Winner: The Mercey Brothers

Other nominees:

- The Chaparrals
- The Hickorys
- The Rainvilles
- Rhythm Pals

=== Top Folk Singer ===
Winner: Bruce Cockburn

Other nominees:

- Great Speckled Bird
- Anthony Green and Barry Stagg
- Joni Mitchell
- Tom Northcott

=== Music industry Man of the Year ===
Winner: Pierre Juneau

=== Broadcaster of the Year ===
Winner: Standard Broadcasting, noted for its Canadian Talent Library

=== Top Canadian Content Company of the Year ===
Winner: Quality Records

Other nominees:

- Capitol Records
- Columbia Records
- London Records
- RCA Records

=== Top Record Company of the Year ===
Winner: Capitol Records

Other nominees:

- Columbia Records
- Quality Records
- RCA Records
- Warner Bros. Records

=== Top Promotional Company of the Year ===
Winner: Capitol Records

Other nominees:

- Columbia Records
- Quality Records
- RCA Records
- Warner Bros. Records

=== Journalist of the Year ===
Winner: Dave Bist, Montreal Gazette

== Nominated and winning albums ==
=== Best Produced Album ===
Winner: Honey, Wheat and Laughter, Anne Murray (producer Brian Ahern)

Other nominees:

- Make Someone Happy, Tom and Judy
- Sit Down Young Stranger, Gordon Lightfoot
- This Way Is My Way, Anne Murray
- Young Years, Pierre Lalonde

== Nominated and winning releases ==
=== Best Produced Single ===
Winner: "Snowbird" by Anne Murray (producer Brian Ahern)

Other nominees:

- "American Woman", The Guess Who
- "As the Years Go By", Mashmakhan
- "Fly Little White Dove, Fly", The Bells
- "If You're Lookin'", Tranquility Base
