= Juno Awards of 1978 =

Canadian music awards ceremony

- Date: 29 March 1978
- Venue: Harbour Castle Hilton Hotel, Toronto, Ontario
- Hosted by: David Steinberg

Television/radio coverage
- Network: CBC

The Juno Awards of 1978, representing Canadian music industry achievements of the previous year, were awarded on 29 March 1978 in Toronto at a ceremony hosted for a second consecutive year by David Steinberg at the Harbour Castle Hilton Convention Centre. A 2-hour broadcast of the ceremonies was available nationally on CBC Television. 1500 people were present at the ceremonies.

At a news conference following the awards, on 31 March 1978, Stompin' Tom Connors announced he would return his Juno trophies to awards organiser CARAS as a protest against rewarding "Juno jumpers" or artists who do not maintain a residence or presence in Canada. Connors earlier withdrew his nomination as Country Male Vocalist of the Year.

== Nominees and winners ==
=== Female Vocalist of the Year ===
Winner: Patsy Gallant

Other nominees:

- Carroll Baker
- Claudja Barry
- Charity Brown
- Joni Mitchell

=== Male Vocalist of the Year ===
Winner: Dan Hill

Other nominees:

- Burton Cummings
- Gordon Lightfoot
- Valdy
- Gino Vannelli

=== Most Promising Female Vocalist of the Year ===
Winner: Lisa Dalbello

Other nominees:

- Claudja Barry
- Alma Faye Brooks
- Glory-Anne Carriere
- Roxanne Goldade

=== Most Promising Male Vocalist of the Year ===
Winner: David Bradstreet

Other nominees:

- Peter Pringle
- Walter Rossi
- Malcolm Tomlinson
- Pat Travers

=== Group of the Year ===
Winner: Rush

Other nominees:

- April Wine
- Bachman–Turner Overdrive
- The Stampeders
- Trooper

=== Most Promising Group of the Year ===
Winner: Hometown Band

Other nominees:

- Prism
- Max Webster
- Jackson Hawke
- Black Light Orchestra

=== Composer of the Year ===
Winner: Dan Hill (Co-composer), "Sometimes When We Touch"

=== Country Female Vocalist of the Year ===
Winner: Carroll Baker

Other nominees:

- Julie Lynn
- Anne Murray
- Chris Nielsen
- Colleen Peterson

=== Country Male Vocalist of the Year ===
Winner: Ronnie Prophet

Other nominees:

- Gary Buck
- Wilf Carter
- Jimmy Arthur Ordge
- Ray Griff

Multiple Juno winner Stompin' Tom Connors withdrew his nomination to protest Junos given to expatriate Canadians.(Green and King, CanadianEncyclopedia.ca)

=== Country Group or Duo of the Year ===
Winner: The Good Brothers

=== Folk Singer of the Year ===
Winner: Gordon Lightfoot

Other nominees:

- Bruce Cockburn
- Dan Hill
- Murray McLauchlan
- Valdy

=== Instrumental Artist of the Year ===
Winner: André Gagnon

Other nominees:

- Liona Boyd
- Hagood Hardy
- Moe Koffman

=== Producer of the Year (single) ===
Winner: Matthew McCauley/Fred Mollin, "Sometimes When We Touch" by Dan Hill

=== Producer of the Year (album) ===
Winner: Matthew McCauley/Fred Mollin, Longer Fuse by Dan Hill

=== Recording Engineer of the Year ===
Winner:(tie)

- Terry Brown, Hope by Klaatu
- David Greene, Big Band Jazz by Rob McConnell and the Boss Brass

=== Canadian Music Hall of Fame ===
Winners:

- Guy Lombardo (posthumous)
- Oscar Peterson

== Nominated and winning albums ==
=== Best Selling Album ===
Winner: Longer Fuse, Dan Hill

Other nominees:

- A Farewell to Kings, Rush
- The Best of the Stampeders, The Stampeders
- Le Saint Laurent, André Gagnon
- My Own Way to Rock, Burton Cummings*

=== Best Album Graphics ===
Winner: Dave Anderson, Short Turn by Short Turn

=== Best Classical Album of the Year ===
Winner: Three Borodin Symphonies, Toronto Symphony Orchestra

- Mendelssoh Quartets Op. 12 & 13 — Orford String Quartet
- Staryk Plays Kreisler — Steven Staryk and Jane Corwin
- To Syngen & Pleye — The Toronto Consort

=== Best Selling International Album ===
Winner: Rumours, Fleetwood Mac

=== Best Jazz Album ===
Winner: Big Band Jazz, Rob McConnell & The Boss Brass

- Ed Bickert — Ed Bickert
- Museum Pieces — Moe Koffman
- Transformations/Invocation — Nimmons 'n' Nine Plus Six
- Country Place — Don Thompson

== Nominated and winning releases ==
=== Best Selling Single ===
Winner: Sugar Daddy, Patsy Gallant

Other nominees:

- "Let's Try Once More", Patrick Norman
- "Que Sera Sera", The Raes
- "Sometimes When We Touch", Dan Hill
- "You Won't Dance With Me", April Wine

=== Best Selling International Single ===
Winner: "When I Need You", Leo Sayer
