= Juno Awards of 1973 =

Canadian music awards ceremony

- Date: 12 March 1973
- Venue: Inn on the Park, Toronto, Ontario
- Hosted by: George Wilson

The Juno Awards of 1973, representing Canadian music industry achievements of the previous year, were awarded on 12 March 1973 in Toronto at a ceremony at the Inn on the Park's Centennial ballroom. Approximately 1500 people attended this event which was hosted by George Wilson of CFRB radio.

David Crombie, Toronto's mayor at that time, presented the Best Male Vocalist award to Stompin' Tom Connors. Gordon Lightfoot also made his first personal appearance at the Junos.

An associated music industry conference known as Communication 6 was held from 10 March and concluded with the Juno Award ceremonies.

Taped excerpts from the awards were broadcast on a special edition of CBC Radio's The Entertainers on 23 March 1973.

== Winners ==
=== Best Female Vocalist ===
Winner: Anne Murray

=== Outstanding Performance – Female ===
Winner: Ginette Reno

=== Best Male Vocalist ===
Winner: Gordon Lightfoot

=== Outstanding Performance – Male ===
Winner: Bob McBride

=== Best Group ===
Winner: Lighthouse

=== Outstanding Performance – Group ===
Winner: Edward Bear

=== Best Songwriter ===
Winner: Gordon Lightfoot

=== Best Country Female Artist ===
Winner: Shirley Eikhard

=== Best Country Male Artist ===
Winner: Stompin' Tom Connors

=== Best Country Group or Duo ===
Winner: The Mercey Brothers

=== Folk Singer of the Year ===
Winner: Bruce Cockburn

=== Outstanding Performance – Folk ===
Winner: Valdy

=== Broadcaster of the Year ===
Winner: VOCM, St. Johns Newfoundland

=== Top Canadian Content Company of the Year ===
Winner: Capitol Records of Canada

=== Top Record Company of the Year ===
Winner: WEA Music of Canada Ltd.

=== Top Promotional Company of the Year ===
Winner: RCA Ltd.

=== Journalist of the Year ===
Winner: Peter Goddard

=== Music Industry Man of the Year ===
Winner: Arnold Gosewich

=== Contribution to Canadian music ===
Winner: David Clayton Thomas

== Nominated and winning albums ==
=== Best Produced Album (middle of the road) ===
Winner: Annie, Anne Murray (produced by Brian Ahern)

== Nominated and winning releases ==
=== Best Produced Single ===
Winner: "Last Song", Edward Bear (produced by Gene Martynec)
