= Juno Awards of 1972 =

Canadian music awards ceremony

- Date: 28 February 1972
- Venue: Inn on the Park, Toronto, Ontario
- Hosted by: George Wilson

The Juno Awards of 1972, representing Canadian music industry achievements of the previous year, were awarded on 28 February 1972 in Toronto at a ceremony at the Inn on the Park hotel's Centennial Ballroom.

Interest in these music awards was gaining rapidly as approximately 1000 attended the ceremonies, compared to 250 in 1970. George Wilson of CFRB radio was again the master of ceremonies for the awards.

Roughly 3000 subscribers of RPM Magazine completed a survey which determined the winners of this year's awards. Most awards are determined by the poll, except for the songwriting category which was chosen by RPM editor Walt Grealis.

== Winners ==
=== Best Female Vocalist ===
Winner: Anne Murray

=== Outstanding Performance – Female ===
Winner: Ginette Reno

=== Best Male Vocalist ===
Winner: Gordon Lightfoot

=== Outstanding Performance – Male ===
Winner: Joey Gregorash

=== Best Group ===
Winner: The Stampeders

=== Outstanding Performance – Group ===
Winner: Lighthouse

=== Best Songwriter ===
Winner: Rich Dodson

=== Best Country Female Artist ===
Winner: Myrna Lorrie

=== Best Country Male Artist ===
Winner: Stompin' Tom Connors

=== Best Country Group or Duo ===
Winner: The Mercey Brothers

=== Folk Singer of the Year ===
Winner: Bruce Cockburn

=== Broadcaster of the Year ===
Winner: The CHUM Group

=== Top Canadian Content Company of the Year ===
Winner: GRT of Canada

=== Top Record Company of the Year ===
Winner: Kinney Music of Canada

=== Top Promotional Company of the Year ===
Winner: Kinney Music of Canada

=== Journalist of the Year ===
Winner: Ritchie Yorke

=== Contribution to Canadian music ===
Winner: George Hamilton IV

== Nominated and winning albums ==
=== Best Produced MOR Album ===
Winner: Talk It Over in the Morning by Anne Murray (produced by Brian Ahern)

== Nominated and winning releases ==
=== Best Produced Single ===
Winner: "Sweet City Woman" by The Stampeders (produced by Mel Shaw
