= Juno Awards of 1998 =

Canadian music awards ceremony

- Date: 22 March 1998
- Venue: GM Place, Vancouver, British Columbia
- Hosted by: Jason Priestley

Television/radio coverage
- Network: CBC

The Juno Awards of 1998 were presented in Vancouver, British Columbia, Canada. The primary ceremonies at GM Place before an audience of 10 000 on 22 March 1998.

Actor Jason Priestley of the television series Beverly Hills, 90210 hosted these ceremonies which were televised by CBC. A backstage internet telecast was also introduced for this year. Performers included Jann Arden, Econoline Crush, Leahy, Sarah McLachlan, Ron Sexsmith, and Shania Twain.

Nominations were announced on 11 February 1998. The previously combined Blues/Gospel category became separate Best Blues Album and Best Gospel Album categories as of this year.

The Canadian Music Hall of Fame welcomed David Foster as its 1998 inductee.

== Controversy ==
Vancouver rap group Rascalz refused their Best Rap Recording award, citing that urban music was hidden in the untelevised Saturday ceremony, rather than being featured during the broadcast of the Sunday evening ceremonies. The band alleged that racism was a factor in the award's scheduling, and for several weeks cultural critics and hip hop musicians debated the issue – some suggested, in fact, that the hip hop award's lack of visibility could be seen as not just a result of Canadian hip hop's poor commercial performance, but also a contributing factor.

The award was moved to the main ceremony for the 1999 awards, where it was again won by Rascalz for their single "Northern Touch".

== Nominees and winners ==
=== Best Female Vocalist ===
Winner: Sarah McLachlan

Other Nominees:

- Jann Arden
- Terri Clark
- Loreena McKennitt
- Shania Twain

=== Best Male Vocalist ===
Winner: Paul Brandt

Other Nominees:

- Bruce Cockburn
- John McDermott
- Bruno Pelletier
- Roch Voisine

=== Best New Solo Artist ===
Winner: Holly McNarland

Other Nominees:

- Lhasa
- Dayna Manning
- Amy Sky
- Tariq

=== Group of the Year ===
Winner: Our Lady Peace

Other Nominees:

- Big Sugar
- Blue Rodeo
- Great Big Sea
- The Tea Party

=== Best New Group ===
Winner: Leahy

Other Nominees:

- Age of Electric
- Bran Van 3000
- Matthew Good Band
- Wide Mouth Mason

=== Songwriter of the Year ===
Winner: Sarah McLachlan with Pierre Marchand, "Building A Mystery" by Sarah McLachlan

Other Nominees:

- Jann Arden, "Wishing That", "The Sound of", "Ode to a Friend" by Jann Arden
- Dean McTaggart, "Dark Horse" (with David Tyson and Amanda Marshall) by Amanda Marshall by Mjila Mason, "Love's Funny That Way" (with David Tyson and Tina Arena) by Wynonna and Tina Arena, "Ma Huitieme Merville" (with David Tyson) by Liane Foly
- Odds, "Someone Who's Cool", "Nothing Beautiful", "Suppertime" by Odds
- David Tyson, "Dark Horse" (with Dean McTaggart and Amanda Marshall) "Beautiful Goodbye" (with Christopher Ward), "Trust Me This Is Love" (with Dean McTaggart) by Amanda Marshall

=== Best Country Female Vocalist ===
Winner: Shania Twain

Other Nominees:

- Terri Clark
- Beverley Mahood
- Shirley Myers
- Michelle Wright

=== Best Country Male Vocalist ===
Winner: Paul Brandt

Other Nominees:

- Julian Austin
- Charlie Major
- Jason McCoy
- Duane Steele

=== Best Country Group or Duo ===
Winner: Farmer's Daughter

Other Nominees:

- Cindy Church with Ian Tyson
- The Cruzeros
- Prairie Oyster
- Thomas Wade and Wayward

=== International Achievement Award ===
Winners:

=== International Album ===
Spice by Spice Girls

=== Best Instrumental Artist ===
Winner: Leahy

Other Nominees:

- Jesse Cook
- Oscar Lopez
- Robert Michaels
- Mythos

=== Best Producer ===
Winner: Pierre Marchand, "Building A Mystery" by Sarah McLachlan

Other Nominees:

- Peter Cardinali and Ian Thomas, "The Way of Things" and "Stuck in Between" by The Boomers
- Corey Hart, "Miles to Go (Before I Sleep)" and "Where Is The Love" by Celine Dion
- Arnold Lanni, "Superman's Dead" and "Clumsy" by Our Lady Peace
- Michael Phillip Wojewoda and Spirit of the West, "Armstrong and the Guys" and "Our Ambassador" by Spirit of the West

=== Best Recording Engineer ===
Winner: Michael Phillip Wojewoda, "Armstrong and the Guys" and "Our Ambassador" by Spirit of the West

Other Nominees:

- Lenny DeRose, "Shine" and "Pearly White" by Junkhouse
- Kevin Doyle, "The Lark in the Clear Air" and "Barbara Allan" by John McDermott
- Chad Irschick, "Godspeed" and "Constance" by Ron Hynes
- Randy Staub, "Volcano Girls" by Veruca Salt and "The Unforgiven II" by Metallica

=== Canadian Music Hall of Fame ===
Winner: David Foster

=== Walt Grealis Special Achievement Award ===
Winner: Sam Feldman

== Nominated and winning albums ==
=== Best Album ===
Winner: Surfacing, Sarah McLachlan,

Other Nominees:

- Creature, Moist
- Clumsy, Our Lady Peace
- Come on Over, Shania Twain
- Kissing Rain, Roch Voisine

=== Best Children's Album ===
Winner: Livin' in a Shoe, Judy & David

Other Nominees:

- Chickee's on the Run, Heather Bishop
- Enchantee, Carmen Campagne
- Planet Lenny, Lenny Graf
- The Truck I Bought From Moe, Al Simmons

=== Best Classical Album (Solo or Chamber Ensemble) ===
Winner: Marc-André Hamelin Plays Franz Liszt, Marc-André Hamelin

Other Nominees:

- Bach: The Six Partitas, Angela Hewitt
- Grainger: Piano Music, Marc-André Hamelin
- Haydn: Four Piano Trios, The Gryphon Trio
- La Jongleuse - Salon Pieces and Encores, Janina Fialkowska

=== Best Classical Album (Large Ensemble) ===
Winner: Mozart Horn Concertos, James Sommerville, CBC Vancouver Orchestra, Mario Bernardi

Other Nominees:

- Carnaval Romain, Montreal Symphony Orchestra, conductor Charles Dutoit
- Bizet: Symphony in C, Montreal Symphony Orchestra, conductor Charles Dutoit
- Tabuh-Tabuhan, Music of Colin McPhee, Esprit Orchestra, Alex Pauk
- Rachmaninov: Piano Concerto No. 4, Toronto Symphony Orchestra, conductor Jukka-Pekka Saraste, piano Alexei Lubimov, Toronto Mendelssohn Choir

=== Best Classical Album (Vocal or Choral Performance) ===
Winner: Soirée française, tenor Michael Schade, baritone Russell Braun, Canadian Opera Company Orchestra, Richard Bradshaw

Other Nominees:

- Carl Orff: Carmina Burana, F.A.C.E. Treble Choir, choeur de l'Orchestre symphonique de Montreal, Orchestre symphonique de Montreal, conductor Charles Dutoit
- The Mystery of Christmas, The Elora Festival Singers, Noel Edison
- Palestrina: Missa "Ut, re, mi, fa, sol, la", Studio de musique ancienne de Montréal. Christopher Jackson
- Vivaldi: Motets for soprano, Karina Gauvin, Les Chambristes de Ville Marie

=== Best Album Design ===
Winner: John Rummen, Crystal Heald, Stephen Chung, Andrew MacNaughtan, Justin Zivojinovich, Songs of a Circling Spirit by Tom Cochrane

Other Nominees:

- Carylann Loeppky, Crystal Heald, Karma by Delerium
- John Rummen, Dennis Keeley, Surfacing by Sarah McLachlan
- Alex Wittholz, Felix Wittholz, Catherine McRae, Kevin Westenberg, Clumsy by Our Lady Peace
- Michael Wrycraft, Kurt Swinghammer, Stephen Chung, David Wilcox Greatest Hits Too by David Wilcox

=== Best Blues Album ===
Winner: National Steel, Colin James

Other Nominees:

- A Big Love, Lester Quitzau
- In the Evening, Vann "Piano Man" Walls
- No Special Rider, Bill Bourne, Andreas Schuld, Hans Stamer
- What Were You Thinking?, The Rockin Highliners

=== Best Gospel Album ===
Winner: Romantics & Mystics, Steve Bell

Other Nominees:

- Caught Up, Sharon Riley and Faith Chorale
- Feel Free, Carolyn Arends
- Just Look, Youth Outreach Mass Choir
- Speak Lord To Me, Hiram Joseph

=== Best Selling Album (Foreign or Domestic) ===
Winner: Spice, Spice Girls

Other Nominees:

- Aquarium, Aqua
- Backstreet Boys, Backstreet Boys
- Backstreet's Back, Backstreet Boys
- Clumsy, Our Lady Peace

=== Best Mainstream Jazz Album ===
Winner: In The Mean Time, The Hugh Fraser Quintet

Other Nominees:

- As We Are Now, Renee Rosnes
- Have Fingers, Will Travel, Oliver Jones
- Here on Earth, Ingrid Jensen
- Love Scenes, Diana Krall

=== Best Contemporary Jazz Album ===
Winner: Metalwood, Metalwood

Other Nominees:

- As If, Ted Quinlan
- Best of Two Worlds, Stefan Bauer
- Inclined, Carol Welsman
- Paired Down, Volume One, D.D. Jackson

=== Best Roots or Traditional Album - Group ===
Winner: Molinos, The Paperboys

Other Nominees:

- Compadres, James Keelaghan & Oscar Lopez
- Leahy, Leahy
- Play, Great Big Sea
- Raw Voice, Wyrd Sisters

=== Best Roots or Traditional Album - Solo ===
Winner: Other Songs, Ron Sexsmith

Other Nominees:

- Another Morning, J. P. Cormier
- Industrial Lullaby, Stephen Fearing
- Suas E!, Mary Jane Lamond
- Words and Pictures, Bob Snider

=== Best Alternative Album ===
Winner: Glee, Bran Van 3000

Other Nominees:

- Get Outta Dodge, Huevos Rancheros
- Love Story, Copyright
- Maybe It's Me, Treble Charger
- Stuff, Holly McNarland

=== Best Selling Francophone Album ===
Winner: Marie-Michèle Desrosiers chante les classiques de Noël, Marie-Michèle Desrosiers

Other Nominees:

- La force de comprendre, Dubmatique
- Miserere, Bruno Pelletier
- Parle pas si fort, Térez Montcalm
- Versions Reno, Ginette Reno

=== Blockbuster Rock Album of the Year ===
Winner: Clumsy, Our Lady Peace

Other Nominees:

- Econoline Crush, The Devil You Know
- Headstones, Smile and Wave
- Moist, Creature
- The Tea Party, Transmission

== Nominated and winning releases ==
=== Single of the Year ===
Winner: "Building a Mystery", Sarah McLachlan

Other Nominees:

- "Clumsy", Our Lady Peace
- "Dark Horse", Amanda Marshall
- "Drinking in L.A.", Bran Van 3000
- "The Sound Of", Jann Arden

=== Best Classical Composition ===
Winner: "Electra Rising", Malcolm Forsyth

Other Nominees:

- "Adieu, Robert Schumann", R. Murray Schafer, The Garden of the Heart
- "Gitanjali", R. Murray Schafer, The Garden of the Heart
- "Symphony No. 2", Colin McPhee, Tabuh-Tabuhan, Music of Colin McPhee
- "Winter Music", Alexina Louie, Tree Line; Music from Canada and Japan

=== Best Rap Recording ===
Winner: Cash Crop, Rascalz (refused)

Other Nominees:

- "Gotta Get Mine", Infinite featuring Divine Earth Essence
- "Just A Second Remix", Choclair
- "Krazy World", Ghetto Concept
- "Rain Is Gone", Frankenstein

=== Best R&B/Soul Recording ===
Winner: "Things Just Ain't The Same", Deborah Cox

Other Nominees:

- "Don't Leave Me Hangin", Camille Douglas
- "The Thing to Do", Glenn Lewis
- Famous, Rich and Beautiful, Philosopher Kings
- "How May I Do You", Unique

=== Best Music of Aboriginal Canada Recording ===
Winner: The Spirit Within, Mishi Donovan

Other Nominees:

- Little Island Cree - World Hand Drum Champions, Little Island Cree with Clayton Chief
- Necessary, No Reservations
- That Side of the Window, Tom Jackson
- Walk Away, Fara Palmer

=== Best Reggae/Calypso Recording ===
Winner: "Catch De Vibe", Messenjah

Other Nominees:

- "Cry for the Children", Jahbeng
- "Flex (Dancehall Mix)", Belinda Brady
- Justuss, Snow
- "Nice & Slow", Leroy Brown

=== Best Global Album ===
Winner: La Llorona, Lhasa

Other Nominees:

- Arc, Thomas Handy Trio
- Chamalongo, Jane Bunnett
- Diye, Takadja
- Varal, Celso Machado

=== Best Dance Recording ===
Winner: "Euphoria (Rabbit in the Moon Mix)", Delerium

Other Nominees:

- "The Spell", Ivan
- "Angel (Angelic Radio Mix)", Joee
- "Move Ya Feet", Paul Jacobs
- "Universal Dream (Telluric Club Mix)", Temperance

=== Best Video ===
Winner: Javier Aguilera, "Gasoline" by Moist

Other Nominees:

- Tim Hamilton, "A Little in Love" by Paul Brandt
- Lisa Mann, "Elmo" by Holly McNarland
- Bill Morrison, "Everything Is Automatic" by Matthew Good Band
- Tony Pantages, "Pearly White" by Junkhouse
