= Juno Award for Folk Artist of the Year =

Canadian music award

The Juno Award for "Folk Artist of the Year" was awarded from 1971 - 1982 as recognition each year for the best new folk artist/musician in Canada.

== Winners ==
=== Top Folk Singer (1971 - 1971) ===
Year	Artist of the Year	Nominees	Ref.
1971	Bruce Cockburn	Great Speckled Bird; Anthony Green and Barry Stagg; Joni Mitchell; Tom Northcott	

=== Folksinger of the Year (1972 - 1979) ===
Year	Artist of the Year	Nominees	Ref.
1972	Bruce Cockburn		
1973	Bruce Cockburn		
1974	Gordon Lightfoot	Bruce Cockburn; Murray McLauchlan; Dave Nicol; Valdy	
1975	Gordon Lightfoot	Bruce Cockburn; Stompin' Tom Connors; Murray McLauchlan; Valdy	
1976	Gordon Lightfoot	Bruce Cockburn; Stompin' Tom Connors; Murray McLauchlan; Valdy	
1977	Gordon Lightfoot	Stompin' Tom Connors; Dan Hill; Murray McLauchlan; Valdy	
1978	Gordon Lightfoot	Bruce Cockburn; Dan Hill; Murray McLauchlan; Valdy	
1979	Murray McLauchlan	Bruce Cockburn; Dan Hill; Gordon Lightfoot; Valdy	

=== Folk Artist of the Year (1980 - 1982) ===
Year	Artist of the Year	Nominees	Ref.
1980	Bruce Cockburn	Gordon Lightfoot; Murray McLauchlan; Joni Mitchell; Valdy	
1981	Bruce Cockburn	Gordon Lightfoot; Murray McLauchlan; The Rovers; Valdy	
1982	Bruce Cockburn	Gordon Lightfoot; Joni Mitchell; The Rovers; Valdy	
