= The Pig and Whistle =

Canadian musical television series

- Genre: Variety show
- Presented by: John Hewer
- Starring: Carlton Showband
- Country of origin: Canada
- Original language: English

Production
- Running time: 30 minutes

Original release
- Network: CTV
- Release: 1967 – 1977

The Pig and Whistle is a Canadian musical television series aired on the CTV television network from 1967 to 1977. Filmed in Toronto, Ontario but set in a fictional English pub, the show featured an assortment of Canadian, British and Irish performers.

One of CTV's most popular programs of its day, The Pig and Whistle drew ratings of over a million viewers in the early 1970s. The programme was hosted by John Hewer and featured the music of the Carlton Showband, a Canadian-Irish musical group. Scottish singer and entertainer Stan Kane was often featured.

The programme's title is derived from one of the names of a traditional English public house, whose meaning in turn remains somewhat speculative.

== Reception ==
Timothy Green in 1972 wrote that CTV's "most popular local programme, known as Pig and Whistle, is a variety show set in a pub with a singing landlord. As I watched it, I wished he'd stick to serving beer".
