= Francis Martin (musician) =

Canadian musician and author

Kaya (Francis Martin)
- Born: Francis Martin Lavergne; August 28, 1968 (age 57); Montreal, Quebec
- Origin: Canada
- Genres: pop, rock, spiritual music
- Occupations: singer-songwriter, author
- Years active: 1980s–present

Francis Martin Lavergne (born August 28, 1968 in Montreal, Quebec) is a Canadian musician and author. He has recorded and performed under the stage names Francis Martin and, as of 2011, Kaya; under the latter name and as James K. Field, he has also published several works of spiritual literature.

== History ==
After an early role in a touring production of Starmania, he began recording in 1984, but his first two albums met with little success. Between 1985 and 1987 he studied classical music at the École de musique Vincent-d'Indy in Outremont, while continuing with studio work and beginning to write songs himself.

CBS Records signed him in 1988, the same year that he signed a writing contract with ATV Music Publishing.

Martin then recorded his third album in French, entitled Drôle de nuit, in New York, and scored his first radio hit with "Elle ne C plus". He garnered a Juno Award nomination for Most Promising Male Vocalist of the Year at the Juno Awards of 1991, and a Félix Award nomination for Pop-Rock Album of the Year in 1990.

He went on to record his fourth album Quand on se donne, which was released on Sony Music in 1992, with producer Aldo Nova. Several songs from this album, including "Rock It", "Tous les jours je pense à toi" and the album's title track "Quand on se donne", were hits in French-speaking Canada and the album was certified gold on March 11, 1993. He was nominated for two Juno Awards in 1993: Best Selling Francophone Album and Male Vocalist of the Year, and "Tous les jours je pense à toi" was nominated for Pop Song of the Year at the 1993 Félix Awards.

He followed up with a self-titled album in 1994, which was not as successful on the charts.

Following that album, Martin left the music business and began writing spiritual literature under the pen names James K. Field and Kaya, later launching his own publishing company. He returned to recording in 2011, releasing an album of spiritual music, Born Under the Star of Change, under the Kaya name.

== Discography ==
- Drôle de nuit (1989)
- Quand on se donne (1992)
- Francis Martin (1994)
- Born Under the Star of Change (2011)

== Awards and nominations ==
- 1990: Félix Award for Pop-Rock Album of the Year, Drôle de nuit (nominee)
- 1991: Juno Award for Most Promising Male Vocalist of the Year (nominee)
- 1993: Juno Award for Best Selling Francophone Album (nominee), Juno Award for Male Vocalist of the Year (nominee)
- 1993: Felix Award for Pop Song of the Year, "Tous les jours je pense à toi" (nominee)
