= Eddie Eastman =

Canadian country music singer-songwriter (born 1949)

- Born: Edward Clive Rowsell; July 15, 1949 (age 77)
- Origin: Terra Nova, Newfoundland, Canada
- Genre: Country
- Occupation: Singer-songwriter
- Instrument: Guitar
- Years active: 1978–1992
- Labels: Bel Air; Columbia; Diamond; Artisan; Book Shop

Eddie Eastman (born July 15, 1949) is a Canadian country music singer-songwriter. Twenty-five of Eastman's singles made the RPM Country Tracks charts, including five which reached the Top Ten. Eastman won the Juno Award for Country Male Vocalist of the Year in 1981 and 1983.

Eastman was inducted into the Canadian Country Music Hall of Fame in 2010.

== Discography ==
=== Albums ===
Year	Album	CAN Country
1979	Easy	14
1980	Eddie Eastman	9
1982	Intimate Strangers	—
1985	The Winning Side	—
1987	Eddie Eastman's Greatest Hits	—

=== Singles ===
Year	Title	Peak chart positions	Album
Year	Title	CAN Country	Album
1978	"That's All I Want from You"	40	Non-album song
1978	"Gone Out in Style"	37	Easy
1979	"Easy"	9	Easy
1979	"Love Is Such an Easy Word to Say"	8	Easy
1980	"I Think I'll Say Goodbye"	4	Easy
1980	"Liftin' Me Up, Lettin' Me Down"	14	Eddie Eastman
1980	"Your Used to Be"	7	Eddie Eastman
1981	"How Deep in Love Am I"	18	Eddie Eastman
1981	"It Will Never Be the Same Again"	35	Eddie Eastman
1981	"Nobody Quite Like You"	11	Intimate Strangers
1982	"From the Bar to the Bedroom"	4	Intimate Strangers
1982	"Intimate Strangers"	14	Intimate Strangers
1983	"Loving You Needing You"	18	Intimate Strangers
1983	"Sherida"	28	Intimate Strangers
1985	"Dreaming All Over Again"	27	The Winning Side
1985	"Take a Chance with Me"	27	The Winning Side
1985	"How Close Am I to Losing You" (with Carroll Baker)	49	The Winning Side
1986	"Mountains Too High to Climb"	45	The Winning Side
1988	"Lying in Your Bed"	33	Non-album song
1990	"What Did You Do for Love"	86	Non-album song
1990	"Baby's Got a Brand New Car"	70	Non-album song
1991	"Big Fool for Loving You"	39	Non-album song
1991	"Runaway Heart"	61	Non-album song
1992	"Smack Dab"	57	Non-album song

==== Guest singles ====
Year	Title	Artist	Peak chart positions	Album
Year	Title	Artist	CAN Country	Album
1983	"Too Hot to Sleep Tonight"	Carroll Baker	35	A Step in the Right Direction
