= Dave Bist =

Canadian journalist

Dave Bist is a Canadian journalist who covered the John Lennon, Yoko Ono Bed-In at the Queen Elizabeth Hotel in 1969 for the Montreal Gazette.

He earned a Juno Award in 1971 as "Canadian Journalist of the Year".

== Bibliography ==
- 1998: editor, Nick: a Montreal life ISBN 1-55065-114-5 (a posthumous collection of writings by Nick Auf der Maur)

== Quote ==
"All kinds of people came to pay their respects, from comedian-singer Tommy Smothers to Li'l Abner cartoonist Al Capp, who kind of betrayed the price of entry by getting into a shouting match with the Peaceful Pair."
