= Juno Awards of 1975 =

Canadian music awards ceremony

- Date: 24 March 1975
- Venue: Canadian National Exhibition, Toronto, Ontario
- Hosted by: Paul Anka

Television/radio coverage
- Network: CBC

The Juno Awards of 1975, representing Canadian music industry achievements of the previous year, were awarded on 24 March 1975 in Toronto at a ceremony in the Canadian National Exhibition. Paul Anka was the host for the ceremonies, which were broadcast for the first time. Canadians were able to watch the event on CBC Television from 10pm Eastern Time.

Stompin' Tom Connors, Susan Jacks, Terry Jacks, Andy Kim, Anne Murray, and The Stampeders appeared at the ceremonies.

With the move to television, control over the Junos shifted from Walt Grealis' RPM Magazine to the new Canadian Music Awards Association. Grealis was now in an advisory role for the Junos, and according to The Globe and Mail, his founding role was not acknowledged during the Junos broadcast.

== Nominees and winners ==
=== Female Vocalist of the Year ===
Winner: Anne Murray

Other nominees:

- Alexis Radlin
- Patsy Gallant
- Susan Jacks
- Cathy Young

=== Male Vocalist ===
Winner: Gordon Lightfoot

- Paul Anka
- Stompin' Tom Connors
- Terry Jacks
- Michel Pagliaro

=== Most Promising Female Vocalist of the Year ===
Winner: Suzanne Stevens

- Alexis Radlin
- Charity Brown
- Debbie Fleming

=== Most Promising Male Vocalist of the Year ===
Winner: Gino Vannelli

- Bill King
- Justin Paige
- Keath Barrie
- Paul Hann

=== Group of the Year ===
Winner: Bachman–Turner Overdrive

- April Wine
- The Guess Who
- Lighthouse
- The Stampeders

=== Most Promising Group of the Year ===
- Rush
- Beau Dommage
- Greaseball Boogie Band
- Mahogany Rush
- Ville Émard Blues Band

=== Composer of the Year ===
Winner: Paul Anka

- Randy Bachman
- Tommy Chong
- Burton Cummings
- Terry Jacks
- Andy Kim
- Gordon Lightfoot
- Joni Mitchell
- Fred Turner
- Neil Young

=== Country Female Vocalist of the Year ===
Winner: Anne Murray

- Carroll Baker
- Linda Brown
- Lynn Jones
- Darlene Madill

=== Country Male Vocalist of the Year ===
Winner: Stompin' Tom Connors

- Dick Nolan
- Lee Roy
- Ian Tyson
- Jerry Warren

=== Country Group or Duo of the Year ===
Winner: Carlton Showband

- Canadian Zephyr
- Family Brown
- Jim and Don Haggart
- The Mercey Brothers

=== Folk Singer of the Year ===
Winner: Gordon Lightfoot

- Bruce Cockburn
- Murray McLauchlan
- Stompin' Tom Connors
- Valdy

=== Producer of the Year ===
Winner: Randy Bachman

- Brian Ahearn
- Bill Amesbury and Bill Gilliland
- John Driscoll
- Terry Jacks
- Andy Kim
- Gene Martynec
- Murray McLauchlan and Bernie Finkelstein
- Jack Richardson
- Mel Shaw

== Nominated and winning albums ==
=== Best Selling Album ===
Winner: Not Fragile, Bachman–Turner Overdrive

- Paul Anka, Anka
- The Guess Who, Best of the Guess Who #2
- Anne Murray, A Love Song

=== Best Album Graphics ===
Winner: Bart Schoales, Night Vision by Bruce Cockburn

- Note: No other nominees currently listed in the Juno Awards database.

=== Best Selling International Album ===
Winner: Band on the Run, Paul McCartney

- John Denver, John Denver's Greatest Hits
- Elton John, Goodbye Yellow Brick Road
- Charlie Rich, Behind Closed Doors
- Various Artists, 41 Original Hits from the Soundtrack of American Graffiti

== Nominated and winning releases ==
=== Best Selling Single ===
Winner: "Seasons in the Sun", Terry Jacks

- Paul Anka, "You're Having My Baby"
- Bachman–Turner Overdrive, "You Ain't Seen Nothing Yet"
- Andy Kim, "Rock Me Gently"
- Wednesday, "Last Kiss"

=== Best Selling International Single ===
Winner: "The Night Chicago Died", Paper Lace

- Paul McCartney and Wings, "Band on the Run"
- George McCrae, "Rock Your Baby"
- Charlie Rich, "The Most Beautiful Girl"
- Ray Stevens, "The Streak"
