= Laura Vinson =

Laura Jeannette Vinson
- Vinson performing

Background information
- Born: May 23, 1947; Edmonton, Alberta, Canada
- Origin: Brule, Alberta, Canada
- Died: July 17, 2025 (aged 78)
- Genres: Folk, country, indigenous
- Occupation: Singer-songwriter
- Labels: Royalty Records, independent
- Website: www.lauravinson.com

Laura Vinson (May 23, 1947 – July 17, 2025) was a Canadian folk and country singer-songwriter. Prominent in the 1970s and 1980s as a mainstream country performer, in later years she had concentrated primarily on recording and performing First Nations and Métis music.

== Life and career ==
Vinson was of French, English, Cree, Iroquois, and Cherokee descent. Vinson was born in Edmonton, Alberta, and raised in Brule. She was a direct descendant of Tête Jaune, a fur trader who played a prominent role in the early development of the Canadian West. She began her music career performing folk music with Bob Ruzicka and rock music with the band Bitter Suite, before turning to country music in 1973 with the band Red Wyng. She released a number of albums on R. Harlan Smith's Royalty Records, and scored hit singles with songs such as "Sweet Mountain Music", "Sun Always Shines", "Mes amis O Canada", "Crazy Heart" and "In My Dreams".

In 1989, she performed on Indian Time, a television special devoted to indigenous music of Canada. Afterward, she began concentrating more strongly on music that reflected her indigenous heritage, releasing several further albums of First Nations and Métis music independently with the band Free Spirit.

Vinson died on July 17, 2025, at the age of 78.

== Awards and honours ==
Vinson was a two-time Juno Award nominee for Most Promising Female Vocalist at the Juno Awards of 1980 and the Juno Awards of 1981, and a four-time Juno nominee for Country Female Vocalist of the Year at the Juno Awards of 1981, 1982, 1983 and 1985.

== Discography ==
- First Flight (1978)
- High Fashion Queen (1980)
- Hootch, Heartache and Hallelujah (1981)
- Adios Mexico (1984)
- Many Moons Ago (1986)
- The Spirit Sings (1989)
- Rise Like a Phoenix (1991)
- Voices on the Wind (1995)
- Point of the Arrow (1999)
- It Reminds Me (2000)
- Mossbag Lullaby (2006)
- Warrior (2013)
