= Carlton Showband =

Canadian Irish musical group

The Carlton Showband was a Canadian musical group of the Irish genre. Formed in Brampton, Ontario in November 1963, the band initially named themselves the Carlton Danceband in reference to Toronto's Carlton Street where Maple Leaf Gardens was located.

== History ==
The initial recording lineup included 5 musicians from Ireland: Chris O'Toole, Christy McLaughlin, Mike Feeney, Seamus Grew, Sean McManus, and Fred White (the lone Canadian, from Nova Scotia). By their second album release, Irishmen Johnny Patterson and Mitch McCoy had been added. The band's album, The Merry Ploughboy, was the first Canadian album to be released on cassette tape.

McCoy departed after 2 years, replaced by Bob Lewis (of Nova Scotia). This would be the usual lineup from about 1968 through the mid-1970s. The band released a number of albums through the RCA label, including Gospel Favourites, which sold more than 200,000 copies.

In 1967, the group became the regular band on The Pig and Whistle, a CTV television musical variety show that continued to air until 1977, and in 1969, they recorded an album of music from the show, Carlton Showband at the Pig 'n' Whistle. The band performed frequently in Newfoundland. In 1971, they toured the Maritimes and won a Gold Leaf award for their album Best of the Carlton Showband.

Despite the end of their regular national television series exposure, the band continued to perform; McManus died 1989. In 1996, the group disbanded, although Fred White continued to do the occasional show using the Carlton Showband name. Between 2000 and 2010 the group remained inactive. O'Toole died in 2005; Patterson in 2007; Lewis in 2008. In 2010, White, Aaron Lewis, Larris and Robert Benoit, Greg Donaghey of Sion Mills, Northern Ireland, and Roddie Lee revived the group for a reunion tour.

Feeney died in 2011, and McLaughlin in 2014. White is the lone surviving member from the originating recording lineup. Seamus Grew died July 2023 after a four-year battle with ALS. Gregory Donaghey died in May 2024.

== Discography ==
=== Albums ===
Year	Album	Chart Positions		CRIA
Year	Album	CAN Country	CAN	CRIA
1966	The Merry Ploughboy	—	—	—
1967	The Carlton Showband	—	—	—
1967	A Night at the Pub	—	—	—
1968	On Tour	—	—	—
1969	Carlton Showband at the Pig 'n' Whistle	—	—	—
1970	Time Gentlemen Please	—	—	—
1971	Best of the Carlton Showband	—	44	—
1971	Carlton Showband Special	—	—	—
1972	Carlton Country	—	36	—
1972	Sing Irishman Sing	—	36	—
1973	By Request (If You're Irish)	—	—	—
1975	Any Dream Will Do	—	30	—
1976	One Up on the World	—	—	—
1977	Here We Go Again	15	75	—
1977	20 Gospel Favourites	—	—	Platinum
1978	Sixteen Most Requested	—	—	—
1979	Hard Times	8	—	—
1980	Back to the Sod	12	—	—
1982	Three Steps to Heaven	—	—	—
1985	Reflections	—	—	—
1986	We Wish You a Merry Christmas	—	—	—
1988	25th Anniversary	—	—	—
1990	Catch the Spirit	—	—	—
1993	25 All-Time Favourites	—	—	—

=== Singles ===
Year	Single	Chart Positions			Album
Year	Single	CAN Country	CAN AC	CAN	Album
1966	"The Merry Ploughboy"	—	—	4	The Merry Ploughboy
1966	"Up Went Nelson"	—	—	53	The Merry Ploughboy
1972	"Roll It Around in Your Mind"	21	3	—	Carlton Showband Special
1973	"Red Haired Mary"	49	12	—	Carlton Showband Special
1973	"Old Johnny Bucka"	—	77	—	Carlton Country
1974	"There's Nothing Like a Newfoundlander"	33	—	—	Any Dream Will Do
1975	"Any Dream Will Do"	14	18	—	Any Dream Will Do
1976	"Harper's Ferry"	32	—	—	One Up on the World
1976	"Sadie the Cleaning Lady"	20	18	—	One Up on the World
1977	"More Than Yesterday"	24	—	—	Here We Go Again
1978	"A Melody You Will Never Forget"	—	18	—	Here We Go Again
1978	"Half Hour Later in Newfoundland"	25	—	—	Sixteen Most Requested
1979	"Hard Times (Comin' Down Again)"	10	—	—	Hard Times
1979	"He Believes in Me"	—	12	—	Hard Times

== Awards and recognition ==
- 1975: winner, Juno Award, Country Group or Duo of the Year
- 1980: nominee, Juno Award, Country Group or Duo of the Year
- 1981: nominee, Juno Award, Country Group or Duo of the Year
