= Juno Award for Country Album of the Year =

Canadian country music award

The Juno Award for "Country Recording of the Year" has been awarded since 1970, as recognition each year for the best country music artist in Canada. A number of previous award categories have been combined under this name, including "Best Country Male Artist", "Best Country Female Artist" and "Country Group or Duo of the Year".

== Winners ==
=== Best Country Male Artist (1970 - 1974) ===
- 1970 - Tommy Hunter
- 1971 - Stompin' Tom Connors
- 1972 - Stompin' Tom Connors
- 1973 - Stompin' Tom Connors
- 1974 - Stompin' Tom Connors

=== Best Country Female Artist (1970 - 1974) ===
- 1970 - Dianne Leigh
- 1971 - Myrna Lorrie
- 1972 - Myrna Lorrie
- 1973 - Shirley Eikhard
- 1974 - Shirley Eikhard

=== Best Country Group or Duo (1970 - 1974) ===
- 1970 - The Mercey Brothers
- 1971 - The Mercey Brothers
- 1972 - The Mercey Brothers
- 1973 - The Mercey Brothers
- 1974 - The Mercey Brothers

=== Country Male Vocalist of the Year (1975 - 1998) ===
- 1975 - Stompin' Tom Connors
- 1976 - Murray McLauchlan
- 1977 - Murray McLauchlan
- 1978 - Ronnie Prophet
- 1979 - Ronnie Prophet
- 1980 - Murray McLauchlan
- 1981 - Eddie Eastman
- 1982 - Ronnie Hawkins
- 1983 - Eddie Eastman
- 1984 - Murray McLauchlan
- 1985 - Murray McLauchlan
- 1986 - Murray McLauchlan
- 1987 - Ian Tyson
- 1989 - Murray McLauchlan
- 1990 - George Fox
- 1991 - George Fox
- 1992 - George Fox
- 1993 - Gary Fjellgaard
- 1994 - Charlie Major
- 1995 - Charlie Major
- 1996 - Charlie Major
- 1997 - Paul Brandt
- 1998 - Paul Brandt

=== Country Female Vocalist of the Year (1975 - 1998) ===
- 1975 - Anne Murray
- 1976 - Anne Murray
- 1977 - Carroll Baker
- 1978 - Carroll Baker
- 1979 - Carroll Baker
- 1980 - Anne Murray
- 1981 - Anne Murray
- 1982 - Anne Murray
- 1983 - Anne Murray
- 1984 - Anne Murray
- 1985 - Anne Murray
- 1986 - Anne Murray
- 1987 - k.d. lang
- 1989 - k.d. lang
- 1990 - k.d. lang
- 1991 - Rita MacNeil
- 1992 - Cassandra Vasik
- 1993 - Michelle Wright
- 1994 - Cassandra Vasik
- 1995 - Michelle Wright
- 1996 - Shania Twain
- 1997 - Shania Twain
- 1998 - Shania Twain

=== Country Group or Duo of the Year (1975 - 1998) ===
- 1975 - Carlton Showband
- 1976 - The Mercey Brothers
- 1977 - The Good Brothers
- 1978 - The Good Brothers
- 1979 - The Good Brothers
- 1980 - The Good Brothers
- 1981 - The Good Brothers
- 1982 - The Good Brothers
- 1983 - The Good Brothers
- 1984 - The Good Brothers
- 1985 - The Family Brown
- 1986 - Prairie Oyster
- 1987 - Prairie Oyster
- 1989 - The Family Brown
- 1990 - The Family Brown
- 1991 - Prairie Oyster
- 1992 - Prairie Oyster
- 1993 - Tracey Prescott & Lonesome Daddy
- 1994 - The Rankin Family
- 1995 - Prairie Oyster
- 1996 - Prairie Oyster
- 1997 - The Rankin Family
- 1998 - Farmer's Daughter

=== Best Country Male Vocalist (1999 - 1999) ===
- 1999 - Paul Brandt

=== Best Country Female Vocalist (1999 - 1999) ===
- 1999 - Shania Twain

=== Best Country Group or Duo (1999 - 2001) ===
- 1999 - Leahy
- 2000 - The Rankins
- 2001 - The Wilkinsons

=== Best Country Male Artist (2000 - 2001) ===
- 2000 - Paul Brandt
- 2001 - Paul Brandt

=== Best Country Female Artist (2000 - 2001) ===
- 2000 - Shania Twain
- 2001 - Terri Clark

=== Best Country Artist/Group (2002) ===
- 2002 - Carolyn Dawn Johnson

=== Best New Country Artist/Group (2002) ===
- 2002 - The Ennis Sisters

=== Country Recording of the Year (2003 - 2009) ===
- 2003 - Shania Twain, "I'm Gonna Getcha Good!"
- 2004 - Shania Twain, Up!
- 2005 - George Canyon, One Good Friend
- 2006 - The Road Hammers, The Road Hammers
- 2007 - George Canyon, Somebody Wrote Love
- 2008 - Paul Brandt, Risk
- 2009 - Doc Walker, Beautiful Life

=== Country Album of the Year (2010 - present) ===
Year	Winner	Album	Nominees	Ref.
2010	Johnny Reid	Dance with Me	Terri Clark, The Long Way Home; Doc Walker, Go; Emerson Drive, Believe; The Road Hammers, The Road Hammers II	
2011	Johnny Reid	A Place Called Love	Gord Bamford, Day Job; Dean Brody, Trail in Life; Carolyn Dawn Johnson, Love Rules; Deric Ruttan, Sunshine	
2012	Terri Clark	Roots and Wings	Doc Walker, 16 & 1; High Valley, High Valley; Jason McCoy, Everything; Jimmy Rankin, Forget About the World	
2013	Johnny Reid	Fire It Up	Dean Brody, Dirt; Chad Brownlee, Love Me or Leave Me; Emerson Drive, Roll; Dallas Smith, Jumped Right In	
2014	Dean Brody	Crop Circles	Gord Bamford, Country Junkie; Tim Hicks, Throw Down; Brett Kissel, Started with a Song; Small Town Pistols, Small Town Pistols	
2015	Dallas Smith	Lifted	Kira Isabella, Caffeine & Big Dreams; Jess Moskaluke, Light Up the Night; MacKenzie Porter, MacKenzie Porter; The Road Hammers, Wheels	
2016	Dean Brody	Gypsy Road	Autumn Hill, Anchor; Paul Brandt, Frontier; High Valley, County Line; Brett Kissel, Pick Me Up	
2017	Jess Moskaluke	Kiss Me Quiet	Gord Bamford, Tin Roof; Chad Brownlee, Hearts on Fire; Aaron Pritchett, The Score; Dallas Smith, Side Effects	
2018	James Barker Band	Game On	Dean Brody, Beautiful Freakshow; Tim Hicks, Shake These Walls; High Valley, Dear Life; Jess Moskaluke, Past the Past	
2019	Brett Kissel	We Were That Song	Tim Hicks, New Tattoo; Jess Moskaluke, A Small Town Christmas; Meghan Patrick, Country Music Made Me Do It; The Reklaws, Feels Like That	
2020	Meghan Patrick	Wild As Me	Dean Brody, Black Sheep; Aaron Goodvin, V; Hunter Brothers, State of Mind; Dallas Smith, The Fall	
2021	Tenille Townes	The Lemonade Stand	Jade Eagleson, Jade Eagleson; Lindsay Ell, Heart Theory; Mackenzie Porter, Drinkin' Songs: The Collection; Dallas Smith, Timeless	
2022	Brett Kissel	What Is Life?	Tenille Arts, Girl to Girl; Dean Brody, Boys; Tim Hicks, Campfire Troubadour; The Reklaws, Sophomore Slump	
2023	Tenille Townes	Masquerades	Jade Eagleson, Honkytonk Revival; High Valley, Way Back; Orville Peck, Bronco; The Reklaws, Good Ol' Days	
2024	James Barker Band	Ahead of Our Time	Dean Brody, Right Round Here; Jade Eagleson, Do It Anyway; Brett Kissel, The Compass Project - South Album; Tyler Joe Miller, Spillin' My Truth	
2025	Josh Ross	Complicated	Brett Kissel, The Compass Project: West Album; Tyler Joe Miller, Going Home; Mackenzie Porter, Nobody's Born with a Broken Heart; Dallas Smith, Dallas Smith	
2026	Cameron Whitcomb	The Hard Way	James Barker Band, One of Us; Brett Kissel, Let Your Horses Run; Meghan Patrick, Golden Child; Josh Ross, Later Tonight	
