= Joey Gregorash =

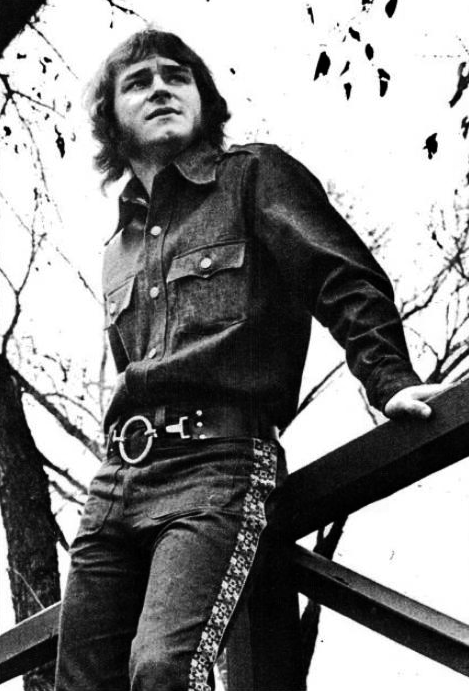
- Joey Gregorash in 1970

Background information
- Origin: Winnipeg, Manitoba, Canada
- Genre: Rock
- Years active: 1965–1975, 1987
- Labels: Polydor, Attic

Joey Gregorash (b. 1950) is a Canadian singer and musician from Winnipeg, Manitoba who became the first solo Manitoba act to win a Juno Award in 1972 for Outstanding Performance-Male.

== Career overview ==
In 1965 Gregorash became a founding member of popular Winnipeg-area band the Mongrels. Originally on drums, by 1966 Gregorash was organist and lead singer for the group which, from 1968, would record five singles for the local Franklin label, with two albums released. In 1969 Gregorash left the Mongrels and after fronting the group Walrus - not connected with the like-named UK progrock outfit - signed as a solo act with Polydor Records. Subsequent to two single releases in the autumn of 1970, Gregorash appeared at the notorious Niverville Pop Festival, leading the crowd in the FISH chant from Woodstock. In January and May 1971, he recorded his debut album North Country Funk at Stax Studios in Memphis. The advance single "Jodie" was issued in March 1971 and became an international hit after charting in Germany, Japan, Australia and reaching #3 on the Canadian charts.

The second single from North Country Funk, "Don't Let Your Pride Get You Girl", was "flipped" by radio d.j.'s who favored the intended B-side, Gregorash's rendition of Neil Young's "Down By the River", which afforded Gregorash a second Canadian Top Ten hit. "Down by the River" would be the only release by Gregorash to attract US attention, reaching #118 on the Singles Chart 101-150 ranked in Record World. "Down by the River" would be featured on Gregorash's second album, Tell the People, which otherwise featured new tracks cut at Trans-Maximus, the Memphis studio owned by Steve Cropper. Issued in 1973, Tell the People afforded Gregorash moderate Canadian chart impact through its three single releases. Gregorash's first two albums and their singles would be issued in the US by Jimmy Webb's Lionel (aka Lion) Records.

In 1973 and 1974, Gregorash concluded his association with Polydor Records with two single releases; he then moved to a career in radio working as a writer of radio ads and also as a disc jockey. When he was starting his music career, Gregorash hosted music shows on Winnipeg television and, from 1986, he tried his hand at this again by hosting "S'kiddle Bits", a noon hour children's variety television show on CKY-TV, which featured in-studio and on-location musical performances and guests from around Manitoba. In 1993 "S'kiddle Bits" was replaced by the adult-oriented "Hi Noon", also hosted by Gregorash, which ran for a year.

In 1984, Gregorash returned to recording with "Love Will Bring It Together", a charity single for the Children's Hospital of Winnipeg which had as its B-side a reworked take on his early single, "Tomorrow Tomorrow". The modified version was called "Together", and Gregorash once performed it at a friend's wedding. As a result of being played by one radio disc jockey in Winnipeg, "Together" eventually accrued sufficient interest for release on Attic Records as "Together (The New Wedding Song)"; it reached the Canadian Top Ten in the summer of 1987. In 1991 Gregorash recorded two new tracks for The Wedding Album: Songs That Say I Love You, which overall was a multi-artist album of previously released tracks, including "Together (The New Wedding Song)". That same year Gregorash recorded his third album: Bop & Rock with Joey which was themed for children.

== Discography ==
=== Albums ===
Year	Album	CAN
1971	North Country Funk	58
1973	Tell the People	—
1987	Together	—

=== Singles ===
Year	Single	Chart Positions				Album
Year	Single	CAN	CAN AC	CAN Country	US	Album
1970	"Stay"/ "I'm Easy Come Easy Go"	84	—	—	—	singles only
1970	"Stay"/ "I'm Easy Come Easy Go"	—	—	25	—	singles only
1970	"Tomorrow Tomorrow"	67	25	—	—	singles only
1971	"Jodie"	3	—	—	—	North Country Funk
1971	"Don't Let Your Pride Get You Girl"/ "Down by the River"	68	—	—	—	North Country Funk
1971	"Don't Let Your Pride Get You Girl"/ "Down by the River"	6	—	—	113	North Country Funk
1972	"My Love Sings"	16	—	—	—	Tell the People
1972	"Bye Bye Love"	73	—	—	—	Tell the People
1972	"Take the Blindness"	14	45	—	—	Tell the People
1973	"Tell the People"	47	11	—	—	Tell the People
1973	"Liza"	51	—	—	—	singles only
1974	"You've Been Wrong"	58	48	—	—	singles only
1987	"Together (The New Wedding Song)"	6	15	—	—	Together
