= Marie Bottrell =

- Born: 1961 (age 64–65); London, Ontario, Canada
- Genre: Country
- Occupations: Singer, songwriter
- Years active: 1978–present
- Labels: MBS, RCA, Cardinal

Marie Diane Bottrell (born 1961) is a Canadian country music singer and songwriter. Bottrell released many singles which appeared on Canadian country music charts, and has received multiple Country Female Vocalist of the Year nominations.

== Early life and education ==
Bottrell was born in London, Ontario. She began singing in her family's band at age eleven. At age 17 she left school to start a career as a singer.

== Career ==
Bottrell sang and wrote songs for the Whitestone Country Band as a teenager. In 1978 she recorded an album, Just Reach Out and Touch Me, on the MBS label. A single from this album, "This Feeling Called Love", was her first hit. That year she performed on at the Grand Ole Opry.

Bottrell was nominated for Country Female Vocalist of the Year at the Juno Awards in 1979, and again each year until 1986.

A second album was recorded in 1980, and that year her best-known single "The Star", was released. In all, eighteen of Bottrell's singles made the RPM Country Tracks charts, including five which reached the Top Ten.

Bottrell won the Canadian Country Music Association award for Female Vocalist of the Year in 1983 and 1984. Later in the 1980s her recording career stalled because of management and label problems, but she began recording again in the 1990s.

Bottrell was inducted into the Canadian Country Music Hall of Fame in 2010. That year she played the lead role in the tribute show "Patsy Cline: The Legend". In 2017 she performed at the CMA Ontario Awards gala.

In 2016 Bottrell performed at the Bluegrass in the Country Festival on Manitoulan Island.

== Discography ==
=== Albums ===
Year	Album	CAN Country
1979	Just Reach Out and Touch Me	—
1980	The Star	3
1982	A Night Like This	—
1984	Everybody Wants to Be Single	27
1985	Girls Get Lonely Too	—

=== Singles ===
Year	Single	Peak positions		Album
Year	Single	CAN Country	CAN AC	Album
1978	"Just Reach Out and Touch Me"	39	—	Just Reach Out and Touch Me
1978	"Always Havin' Your Love"	39	—	Just Reach Out and Touch Me
1979	"This Feeling Called Love"	21	—	Just Reach Out and Touch Me
1979	"Oh Morning Sun Shine Bright"	29	39	Just Reach Out and Touch Me
1979	"The Star"	3	—	The Star
1980	"Flames of Evil Desire"	6	—	The Star
1980	"The Ballad of Lucy Jordan"	10	—	The Star
1981	"Wonderin' If Willy"	8	—	The Star
1982	"Lay Your Heart on the Line"	14	—	A Night Like This
1982	"Does Your Heart Still Belong to Me"	10	—	A Night Like This
1983	"Only the Names Have Been Changed"	17	—	A Night Like This
1983	"Everybody Wants to Be Single"	12	—	Everybody Wants to Be Single
1984	"Lovers Moon"	21	—	Everybody Wants to Be Single
1984	"Until Forever"	33	—	Everybody Wants to Be Single
1985	"Premeditated Love"	23	—	Girls Get Lonely Too
1986	"Girls Get Lonely Too"	34	—	Girls Get Lonely Too
1991	"Lasso Your Love"	73	—	singles only
1992	"I Don't Give Up So Easy"	52	—	singles only
