= Jessie Burns =

Canadian country music performer

Jessie Burns (born c.1954 in Longview, Alberta, Canada) is a Canadian country music performer who originated from Alberta. She was nominated Female Vocalist of the Year at the Juno Awards of 1983, on the strength of her Nashville-produced album One Less Lonely Night (Churchill Records, CR-22005, distribution by MCA Records).

In 1987, she released a Christmas song, "Let's Spend Christmas Together".

== Discography ==
=== Albums ===
Year	Album
1983	One Less Lonely Night

=== Singles ===
Year	Single	Chart Positions		Album
Year	Single	CAN Country	CAN AC	Album
1982	"All From Loving You"	36		One Less Lonely Night
1983	"One Less Lonely Night"	27	16	One Less Lonely Night
1983	"One Less Lonely Night" (Re-Entry)	17		One Less Lonely Night
