= Straight Lines (band) =

Former Canadian pop-rock band

- Origin: Vancouver, British Columbia, Canada
- Genres: Pop rock
- Years active: 1968–1982
- Label: Epic Records
- Members: Robert (Bob) Buckley; David Sinclair; Peter Clarke; Peter Padden; Daryl Burgess; Geoff Eyre

Straight Lines was a Canadian pop-rock band from Vancouver, British Columbia. They are most noted for their single "Letting Go", which was a Top 10 hit on the Canadian charts in 1982 and earned the band nominations for Best Single and Best Composer at the Juno Awards of 1983.

== Background ==
The band was formed in the 1970s by vocalist and keyboardist Bob Buckley and guitarist David Sinclair, initially under the name Spring. Sinclair had previously been associated with Sunshyne, an early incarnation of Prism. Prior to founding Spring, Buckley, an accomplished musician from Britain, had been working as a session musician and playing on the television series Let's Go. They added bassist Peter Clarke, percussionist Peter Padden and drummer Daryl Burgess and changed their name to Dogstar. By 1979, they were well known on the Vancouver club scene and, after attracting the attention of Bruce Allen, they were signed to Epic Records, and again changed their name, to Straight Lines.

== Recording career ==
As Straight Lines, the band released their self-titled debut album in 1980. The album saw modest radio success with the singles "The Things You Didn't Do" and "Roanne", which peaked at #76 on the RPM100. The band toured Canada as an opening act for Prism and Klaatu.

Padden and Burgess were replaced by drummer Geoff Eyre, and the band released their 1981 album Run for Cover. The second album featured "Letting Go" and the more modest follow-up hit "There Are No Secrets" (#40), but when the album's third single "Illusions" failed to chart they were dropped by their record label, and broke up at the end of 1982. At the Juno Awards of 1983, "Letting Go" was nominated for Single of the Year; for the same song, Buckley and Sinclair were nominated as Composer of the Year.

== Later career ==
Following the band's breakup, Sinclair and Buckley went on to form the band Body Electric. Sinclair played guitar parts on "Tears Are Not Enough", and went on to work as a touring and session musician for k.d. lang and Sarah McLachlan, while Buckley became a songwriter for other artists and a composer for film and television, most notably composing the long-running "Root Bear March" jingle for A&W Canada.

== Discography ==
=== Albums ===
Title	Release	Peak chart positions
Title	Release	CAN
Straight Lines	1980	56
Run For Cover	1981	32

=== Singles ===
Title	Release	Peak chart positions		Album
Title	Release	CAN	CAN AC	Album
"Roanne"	1980	76	—	Straight Lines
"Heads Are Gonna Roll"	1980	—	—	Straight Lines
"The Things You Didn't Do"	1980	—	—	Straight Lines
"Letting Go"	1981	6	22	Run For Cover
"There Are No Secrets"	1982	40	—	Run For Cover
"Illusions"	1982	—	—	Run For Cover
"—" denotes a recording that did not chart.
