= Inn on the Park =

Building in Ontario, Canada

Coordinates: 43.719528°N 79.349248°W

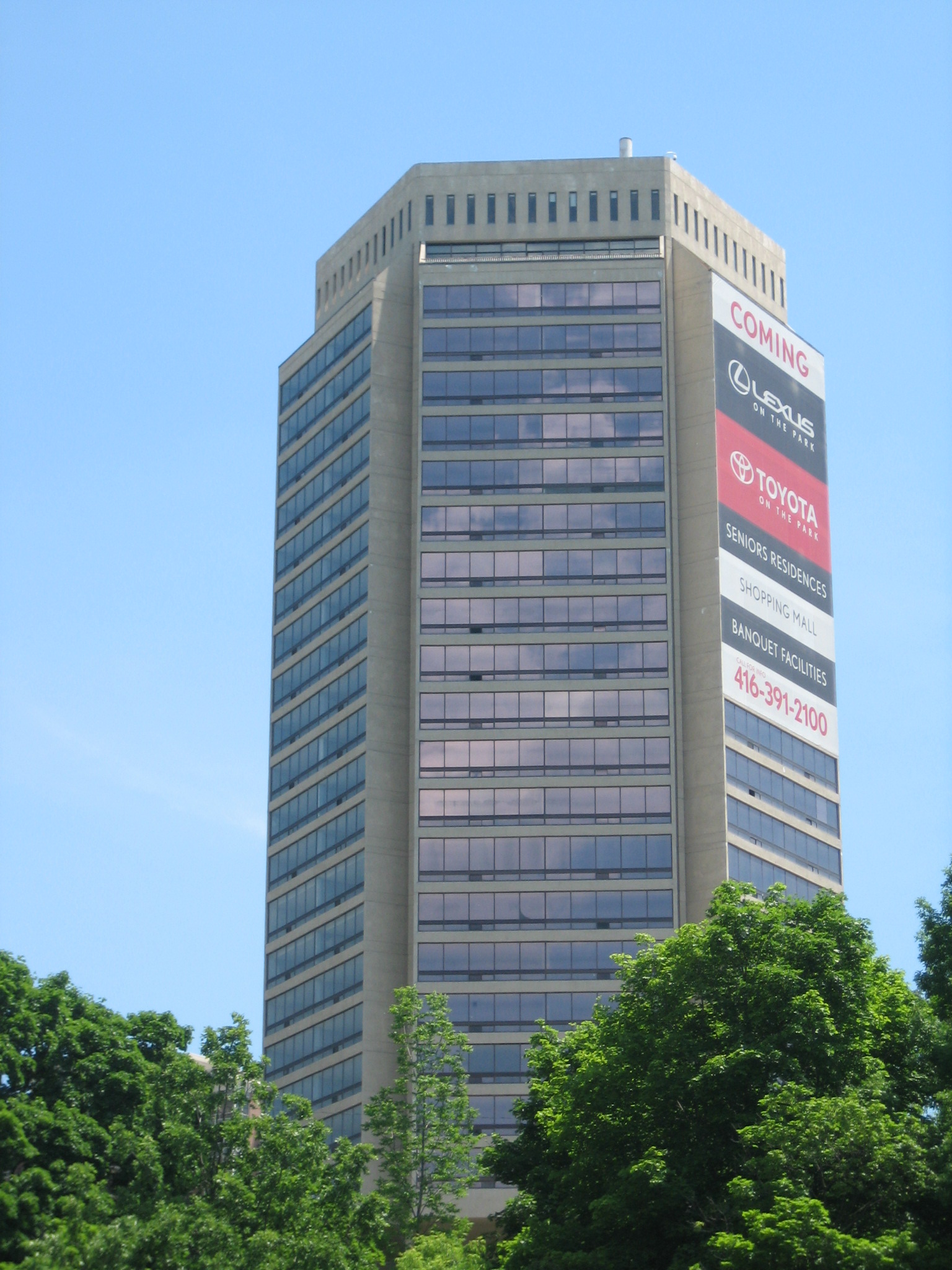
The Inn on the Park building in June 2008.

Inn on the Park North York was a luxury hotel which was formerly located on a hill overlooking Leslie Street and Eglinton Avenue in North York, Ontario (now Toronto). It was one of the early Toronto hotels operated by the Four Seasons Hotel chain.

== History ==
=== Urban resort ===
In 1961, the newly founded company Four Seasons Hotels opened its first hotel, The Four Seasons Motor Hotel, on Jarvis Street in Toronto.

In May 1963, the company opened The Inn on the Park on former farmland in North York for $4 million, This was the company's first hotel outside of downtown Toronto, and was more upscale than the company's earlier properties. Inn on the Park was among the new hotels constructed in Metro Toronto, along with the Canadiana Motor Inn (Kennedy Road and Highway 401), the Constellation (Dixon Road near Toronto International Airport), the Executive Motor Hotel (King Street near Bathurst) and the Valhalla Inn (along Highway 427), all of them being full-service hotels in contrast to earlier suburban motels.

The site was chosen for its proximity to the Don Valley Parkway, "geographically central for all of Metro Toronto" although "out in the middle of nowhere". The property services focused on the company's emphasis of resort and business travel. The hotel was surrounded by 600 acres (240 ha) of parkland, and included Café Discotheque, Canada's first disco. It contained Olympic-sized pools, a small golf course and a ballroom.

The original building, with a six-story central section and two-story wings, was designed by architect Peter Dickinson, who had also designed The Four Seasons Motor Hotel. The building had the shape of a parallelogram. When seen from the air, the building resembled a Star of David.

=== Growth and focus on luxury ===
After the completion of the Inn on the Park, Four Seasons began to build more luxurious hotels, including one in London, England, also at first called Inn on the Park. The building of the Four Seasons Yorkville shortly after the expansion of the Don Mills property put a financial strain on the company. In line with this change in corporate strategy, in 1971 the Inn was enlarged by the addition of a 23-story tower designed by Venchiarutti Gagliardi Architect, Inc., with 269 rooms. A 30,000-square-foot (2,800 m^{2}) convention area, a restaurant and a lounge were also added. Four Seasons chairman Isadore Sharp has since regretted adding the 23 story tower as it ruined the resort atmosphere of the existing property.

The Inn hosted many celebrity guests, including Pierre Trudeau and Nikita Khrushchev. In 1974, Queen Elizabeth, The Queen Mother, attended a regimental dinner at the inn, for The Toronto Scottish Regiment (Queen Elizabeth, The Queen Mother's Own), of which Her Majesty was Colonel-in-Chief. Pianist Glenn Gould had a studio there at one time. Soviet minister Alexei Kosygin's visit touched off a large rally urging the USSR to allow emigration of Jews.

=== Decline and demise ===
A decade after the expansion, in January 1981, the second-floor meeting room in the tower suffered a fire, and although the fire was mostly confined to the source, smoke billowed up the shafts into rooms. Six people died from carbon monoxide poisoning, including Canadian television producer and director Cecil "Cy" True. Some suggested that this started the property's decline.

By the 1980s the Four Seasons chain had developed into an international brand; the Inn on the Park was no longer typical of its hotels, and did not attract the same customers as the other hotels in the chain. The property was sold in the 1980s.

The hotel was converted to a Holiday Inn (signage replaced the Inn on the Park on the lower tower) and later by new owners Rowntree Enterprises as Toronto Don Valley Hotel. The final owners made the decision to redevelop the property. The hotel ceased operating in 2005 and the original hotel, restaurants and convention centre were demolished in 2006, the day before the Toronto city council was to have debated declaring it a heritage site.

There was a ground breaking ceremony at the start of catering season, summer of 2009, and the conversion began to turn the convention centre into a high-end venue and conference centre. Besides the original ballroom, there were five or six other spaces that would eventually be refurbished and rented out for various gatherings. The site was owned by Rowntree. The site also became a Toyota and Lexus dealership, known as "Toyota On The Park". The iconic stone wall was retained. The 1971 tower was initially being proposed for reuse as seniors condos, however these plans fell through. As of September 2014, Pro Green Demolition had begun work to bring the remaining tower down.
