= Gary Gray (sound engineer) =

Gary Gray is a recording engineer from Toronto, Ontario, Canada. He's recorded albums for artists such as Bruce Cockburn, Gordon Lightfoot, Rough Trade, Murray McLauchlan and Brent Carver. He's also recorded music by such composers as Howard Shore, John Debney, Georges Delerue, Marvin Hamlisch, Gary Chang, Lee Holdridge, Kenneth Wannberg, and Christopher Dedrick. Gray worked as an engineer and senior orchestral engineer at Manta Sound in Toronto for 28 years before its eventual closure. He now works freelance in Toronto and has recently engineered live recordings for the Toronto Symphony Orchestra. He won the Juno Award for Recording Engineer of the Year in 1982, and was also a nominee for the award in 1981, 1983, 1984 and 1985.
