= Gold Leaf Awards of 1970 =

Canadian music awards ceremony

- Date: 23 February 1970
- Venue: St. Lawrence Hall, Toronto, Ontario
- Hosted by: George Wilson

The Gold Leaf Awards of 1970, which were the first Juno Awards, were founded by RPM Magazine to honour Canadian music industry achievements. The magazine had honoured musicians in the previous six years using a reader survey until this formal ceremony.

These awards were presented at St. Lawrence Hall in Toronto on 23 February 1970. 250 people attended this inaugural awards ceremony, twice the number who were invited. Winners received walnut wood trophies that resembled metronomes. George Wilson of CFRB radio was master of ceremonies for these awards and for the subsequent Juno Awards ceremonies until 1974.

== Winners ==
=== Top Male Singer ===
Andy Kim

=== Top Female Vocalist ===
Ginette Reno

=== Top Vocal Instrumental Group ===
The Guess Who

=== Top Country Male Artist ===
Tommy Hunter

=== Top Country Female Artist ===
Dianne Leigh

=== Top Country Instrumental Vocal Group ===
The Mercey Brothers

=== Top Folksinger (or Group) ===
Gordon Lightfoot

=== Canadian Industry Music Industry Man of the Year ===
Saul Holiff

=== Best Produced Single ===
"Which Way You Goin' Billy?", The Poppy Family

=== Best Produced Middle-of-the-Road Album ===
Which Way You Goin' Billy?, The Poppy Family

=== Top Record Company ===
RCA Records

=== Top Canadian Content Company ===
Quality Records

=== Top Record Company in Promotional Activities ===
Capitol Records

=== Special RPM Radio Award For Community Activities ===
CKLG Vancouver (Now CFOX-FM)
