= Tom Northcott =

- Born: August 29, 1943 (age 82); Vancouver, British Columbia, Canada
- Genres: Folk; rock
- Occupation: Singer

Tom Northcott (born August 29, 1943 in Vancouver, British Columbia, Canada) is a Canadian folk-rock singer with hits in the late 1960s and early 1970s.

== Musical career ==
He became known to a Canadian audience by his regular appearances on CBC Television's Let's Go music program in 1964-68. He was nominated as best male vocalist for a Juno Award in 1971. Later he co-founded Mushroom Studios in Vancouver and produced records. His hits are played regularly on Canadian classic rock radio stations.

"She Loves Me, She Loves Me Not" (1965) was by 'Tom Northcott & the Vancouver Playboys'; the Playboys were an established band that had played around British Columbia since 1962. Northcott joined the band on a tour in 1965, and issued the single on his own label. The 1966 singles were by 'The Tom Northcott Trio', which consisted of Tom Northcott, Chris Dixon (drums), and Rick Enns (bass). Four of his hits were, "1941", "Girl from the North Country", "Suzanne" and "Sunny Goodge Street".

In 2010, Rhino Records released a retrospective compilation of Northcott's late-1960s work, Sunny Goodge Street: The Warner Bros. Recordings.

== Retirement and life after music ==
Northcott gave up his performing and singing career in the early 1970s and became a commercial fisherman in British Columbia. He attempted to run in the 1972 British Columbia general election as a member of the Progressive Conservative Party of British Columbia in Vancouver Centre but his nomination papers were not filed on time. He later entered law school which spawned a career in maritime and admiralty law. He is now retired and living in Kamloops, British Columbia. He was inducted into the BC Entertainment Hall of Fame in 2008.

== Discography ==
=== Albums ===
Year	Album	CAN
1971	Upside Downside	58
1993	So...You Thought You Heard It All	-
1997	Joyful Songs of Leonard Cohen	-
2010	Sunny Goodge Street: The Warner Bros. Recordings	-

=== Singles ===
Year	Single	Chart Positions				Album
Year	Single	CAN	CAN AC	CAN Country	US	Album
1965	"She Loves Me, She Loves Me Not"	—	—	—	—	singles only
1966	"Just Don't"	—	—	—	—	singles only
1966	"Going Down"	49	—	—	—	singles only
1967	"Sunny Goodge Street" (Donovan)	20	—	—	123	singles only
1968	"1941" (Nilsson)	68	—	—	88	singles only
1968	"Girl from the North Country" (Dylan)	65	—	—	—	singles only
1969	"Make Me an Island"	—	—	—	—	singles only
1969	"Ask Me No Questions"	—	—	—	—	singles only
1970	"The Rainmaker" (Nilsson, Martin)	38	28	—	—	singles only
1970	"Crazy Jane"	12	—	—	—	Upside Downside
1970	"I Think It's Going to Rain Today" (Newman)	46	17	—	—	Upside Downside
1971	"Spaceship Races" (Goffin, King)	61	—	—	—	Upside Downside
1971	"Suzanne"	—	8	—	—	Upside Downside
1990	"The Trouble with Love"	—	—	33	—	single only
