= Ginette Reno =

Canadian singer-songwriter (born 1946)

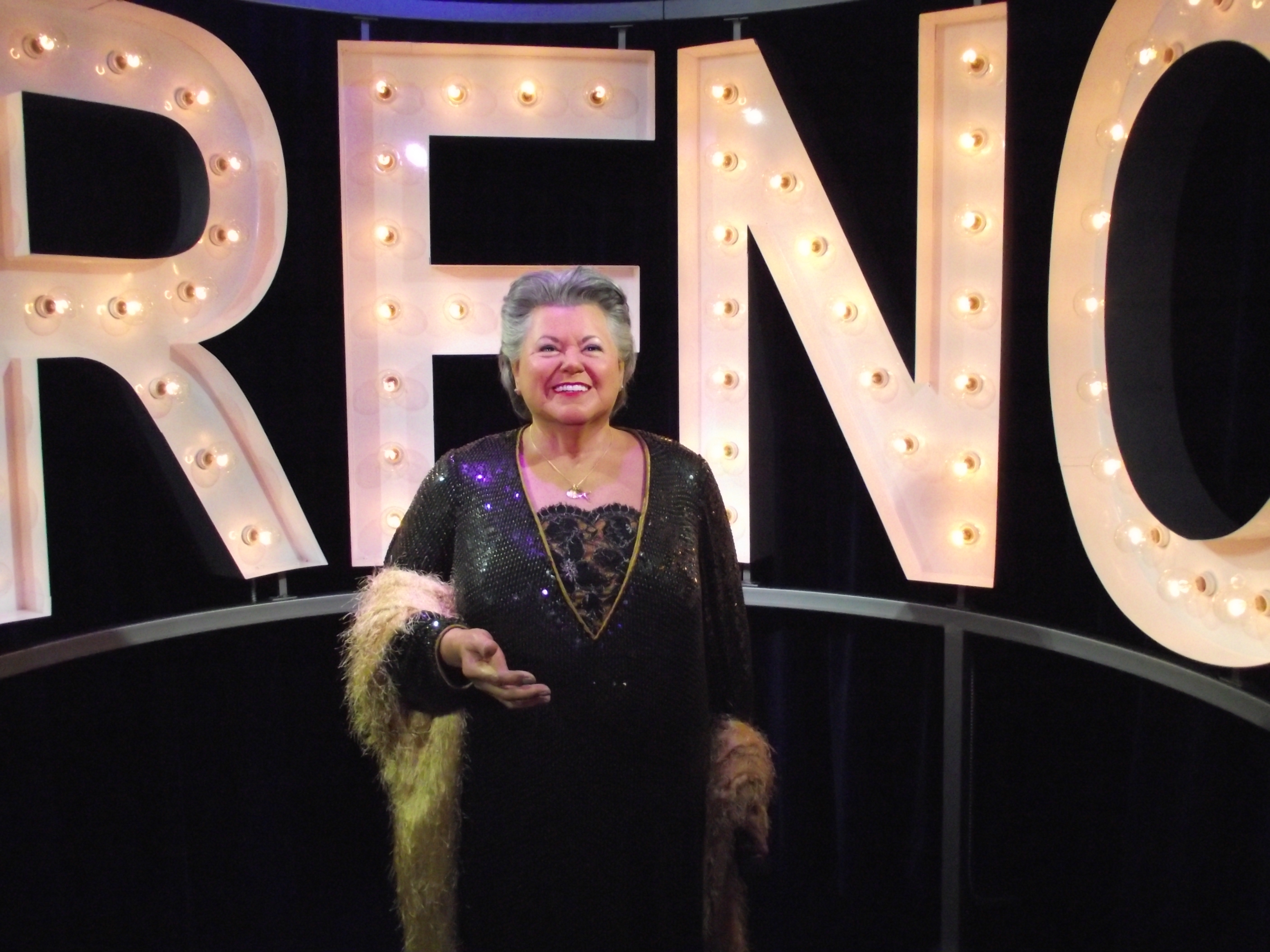

Background information
- Born: Ginette Raynault; 28 April 1946 (age 80); Montreal, Quebec, Canada
- Genres: Pop
- Years active: 1959–present
- Labels: Apex, Grand-Prix, Parrot, Trans-World, Melon-Miel
- Website: ginettereno.com

Ginette Reno OC CQ (born Ginette Raynault; 28 April 1946) is a Canadian singer, songwriter and actress. She has received nominations for the Genie and Gemini Awards and is a multi-recipient of the Juno Award. She is a gold and platinum selling Canadian musician.

== Early life ==
Reno was born Ginette Raynault in Montreal, Quebec, Canada, she began singing in 1960 and won the talent contest "Les Découvertes de Jean Simon" (Jean Simon's Discoveries). With this success, three clubs in Montreal (Café Caprice, le Café de l'Est and the Café Provincial) offered Reno her first professional contract. Simon suggested she adopt the stage name Reno—a phonetic spelling of her real last name (as pronounced in Canadian French).

== Career ==
=== Music ===
Reno is a gold and platinum selling Canadian artist. She has recorded in both English and French. Her biggest hit in English was her 1970 song "Beautiful Second Hand Man". It reached No. 8 on the RPM singles chart. The song was from her third album Beautiful Second Hand Man released in 1971 on Parrot Records. The song was re-released on the French record label Melon-Miel on a two disc compilation Vocally Yours Vol. 7 & 8 in 2004. Among her recordings is a Lynsey de Paul song "Dans la vie tout s'arrange" (Storm in a Teacup) with French lyrics provided by Marcel Stellman. She mostly performs in Quebec. During her four-decade career, she has recorded approximately 60 albums. Between 1969 and 1974 she had 9 songs in the RPM Top 100.

In March 2019, she was one of 11 singers from Quebec, alongside Céline Dion, Diane Dufresne, Isabelle Boulay, Luce Dufault, Louise Forestier, Laurence Jalbert, Catherine Major, Ariane Moffatt, Marie Denise Pelletier and Marie-Élaine Thibert, who participated in a supergroup recording of Renée Claude's 1971 single "Tu trouveras la paix" after Claude's diagnosis with Alzheimer's disease was announced.

=== Film ===
Reno played the mother in Jean-Claude Lauzon's 1992 film Léolo. She played Laura Cadieux in Denise Filiatrault's 1998 film It's Your Turn, Laura Cadieux (C't'à ton tour, Laura Cadieux). The role earned her a Genie Award nomination for Best Actress. She reprised her role for the 1999 sequel Laura Cadieux II (Laura Cadieux...la suite). She was again nominated at the 2000 Genie Awards. She played the role of Maria Barberini in the 2003 Canadian independent film Mambo Italiano. She played Blanche in the 2006 film A Family Secret (Le secret de ma mère), earning her a Best Actress in a leading role Genie Award nomination.

In 2022, Ginette Reno came back to the big screen after 16 years in Martin Villeneuve's The 12 Tasks of Imelda (Les 12 travaux d'Imelda), co-starring playwright Robert Lepage, in which she plays Martin and Denis Villeneuve's maternal grandmother Simone, Imelda's lifelong adversary.

=== Television ===
Reno was twice nominated for a Gemini at the 1999 Gemini Awards and 2000 Gemini Awards.

=== The Charlebois wedding: the Hell's Angels controversy ===
On 5 August 2000, Reno performed at the wedding of the Hell's Angel René Charlebois, serenading the Angels with such hits as "Mon May", for which she was paid $1 million, and at the same wedding posed for photographs with Maurice "Mom" Boucher, the leader of the Angels in Quebec at the time. As Reno has a very matronly and respectable image in Quebec, her willingness to pose smiling next to Boucher, a man convicted of rape amongst other things, caused some controversy.

=== Montreal Canadiens ===
During the 2014 Stanley Cup playoffs, Reno was a surprise selection to perform O Canada during the Montreal Canadiens' playoff run. She had just returned from heart surgery, and her rendition of the anthem was very well received. She has since returned to sing for the 2015 and 2017 Stanley Cup playoffs. She previously sang the anthems for the Quebec Nordiques as well in the 1980s and 1990s and as well as the 64th Grey Cup in 1976.

== Honours ==
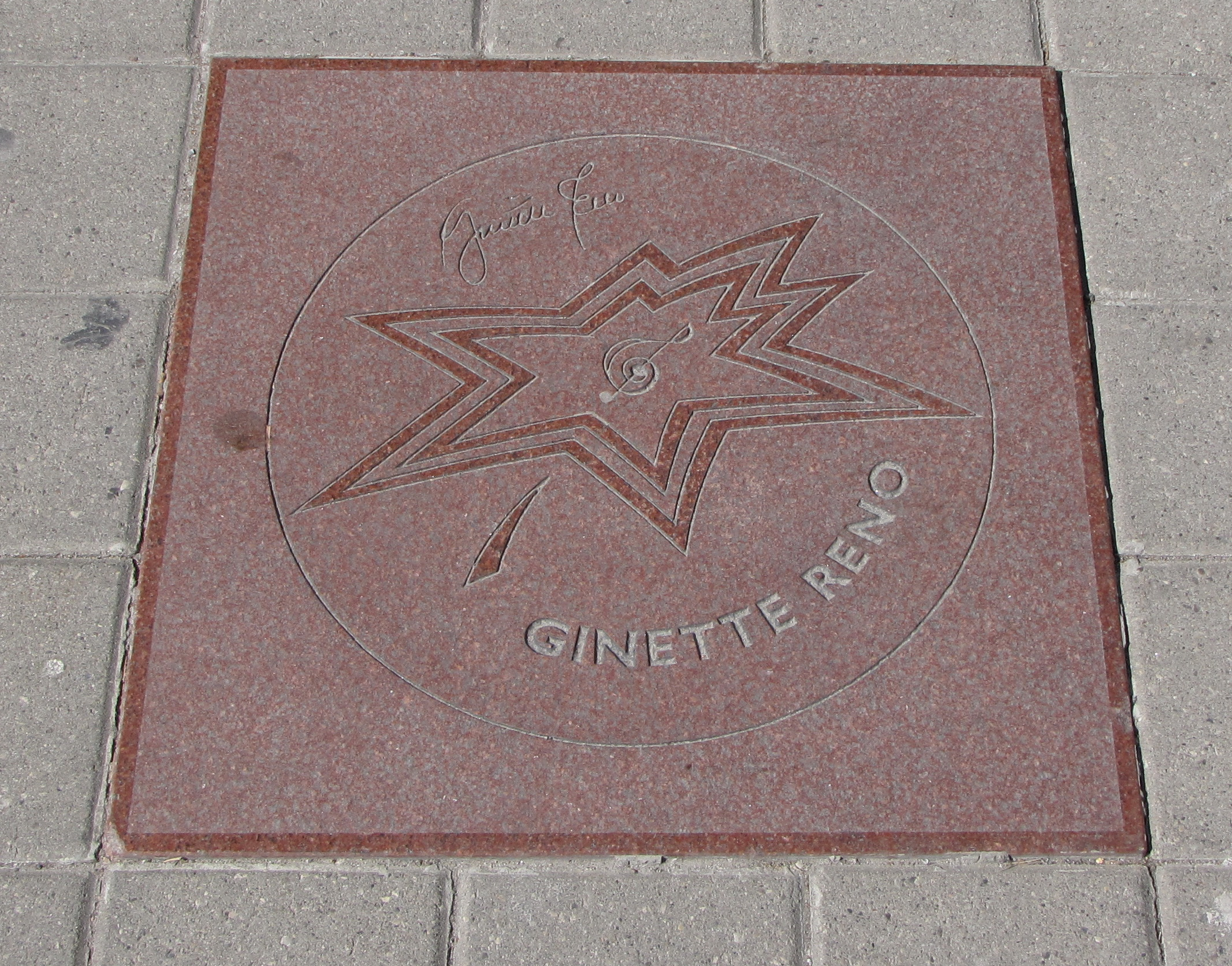
Reno's star on Canada's Walk of Fame.

Reno won the Top Female Vocalist at the Gold Leaf Awards of 1970. She was awarded a 1972 Juno and a 1973 Juno in the category Outstanding Performance of the Year – Female. Reno was nominated for a Juno in 1998 in the category Best Selling Francophone Album for her album Versions Reno. She was again nominated at the Juno Awards of 1999 for Best Female Vocalist. In 2001 she won a Juno Award for Francophone Album of the Year for her album Un Grand Noël d'amour. In 2010 Reno was nominated for a Juno Fan Choice Award.

In June 1982, she was made an Officer of the Order of Canada. In 1999, Reno was awarded the Governor General's Performing Arts Award for Lifetime Artistic Achievement, Canada's highest honour in the performing arts. In 2000, she was inducted into Canada's Walk of Fame. In 2004, she was made a Knight of the National Order of Quebec.

The Canada Gazette announced on 30 April 2011 that Mme Reno was appointed as a Knight of the Order of Arts and Letters by the President of the French Republic.

The Canada Gazette announced on 24 April 2021, that Reno was appointed as a Knight of the National Order of the Legion of Honour, in which she was invested in on 28 April 2022.

In 2002 and 2012, Mme Reno received the Queen Elizabeth II Golden Jubilee Medal and Diamond Jubilee Medal, in particular due to her induction as an Officer in the Order of Canada.

== Filmography ==
=== Film ===
Year	Title	Role	Notes
1992	Léolo	Mother	
1996	Dionne quintuplets (telefilm)	Madame Legros	
1998	It's Your Turn, Laura Cadieux	Laura Cadieux	
1999	Laura Cadieux II	Laura Cadieux	
2003	Mambo Italiano	Maria Barberini	
2006	A Family Secret	Blanche	
2020	Imelda 3: Simone	Simone	
2022	The 12 Tasks of Imelda (Les 12 travaux d'Imelda)	Simone	
2023	Katak: The Brave Beluga (Katak, le brave béluga)	Grandmother	English and French versions

== See also ==
- Music of Canada
- Canadian rock
- List of Canadian musicians
