= Harlequin (band) =

Canadian band formed 1975

- Origin: Winnipeg, Manitoba, Canada
- Genre: Rock
- Years active: 1975–present
- Label: Epic
- Members: George Belanger; Derrick Gottfried; A.J. Chabidon; Chris Burke-Gaffney; Gary Golden
- Past members: Ralph James; David Budzak; Glen Willows; Nik Rivers; Rob Waite; M.J. Hutton; Randy Heibert; Randy Booth; Brad Meadmore; Craig Fotheringham; Ingemar Muench; Steve Broadhurst; Darren Moore; Paul McNair
- Website: http://www.harlequintheband.com

Harlequin is a Canadian rock band from Winnipeg, Manitoba, that formed in 1975. The band is best known for the hit singles "Innocence", "Thinking of You", "Superstitious Feeling", and "I Did It for Love".

== History ==
In 1975, Winnipeg bassist Ralph James formed Harlequin upon recruiting vocalist George Belanger (former frontman with Next), guitarist Glen Willows, keyboardist Gary Golden, and drummer David Budzak. The band began recording demos and travelling to Toronto to perform in the local bars and clubs. It was in one of these small bars in Toronto that Harlequin were discovered by representatives of Jack Douglas, the producer of Aerosmith, John Lennon, and Patti Smith, after they tried to see another band in a larger bar downstairs, but could not gain admittance due to a sell-out crowd. These two individuals later became the producers of the first album, Victim of a Song. They were Lachlan MacFadyen and Kent Dobney.

Douglas helped get Harlequin signed to CBS/Epic Records in 1979, and later that year that band released their first LP, Victim of a Song, which went Gold, and received heavy radio play, particularly in Western Canada. Douglas was listed as the record's executive producer. For the next two albums, Douglas acted as producer. The band's second release, Love Crimes (1980), yielded two hits, "Thinking of You", and "Innocence", Harlequin's biggest hit to date. Harlequin's third album, One False Move (1982), contained two more hits, "Superstitious Feeling" and "I Did It for Love".

For their self-titled fourth studio album, Harlequin replaced Douglas with The Fixx bassist Alfie Agius as their producer. Harlequin (1984) produced only one single, "Take This Heart". The band effectively split after this album but, in 1986, Harlequin released their Greatest Hits album with one new track "(It's) No Mystery". This track was written by David Bendeth and Tom Cochrane, produced by Bendeth, and featured Belanger on lead vocals backed by Randy Booth, Randy Heibert, and some session musicians. In 1986, the line-up was Belanger (vocals), Randy Heibert (guitar), Randy Booth (bass), Ingemar Muench (keys), and Brad Meadmore (drums). The line-up changed almost yearly through the rest of the 1980s until 1987, when the line up of Glen Willows, George Belanger, Nik Rivers, Rob Waite, and M.J. Hutton toured parts of Canada up to 2007. Throughout that period Steve Broadhurst toured with the band as a sub for Rob Waite, and Paul McNair was also a sub for M.J.

In 2004, the band released an album titled Harlequin II. The band was always active; leader George Belanger kept the band active while running another business for 18 years. He then set that enterprise aside and began recording again and released Waking the Jester, in 2007, then a live album, On/Q, in 2009.

In 2006, the band was inducted into the Western Canadian Music Hall of Fame at the Western Canadian Music Awards.

In 2007, Harlequin consisted of guitarist Derrick Gottfried, bassist Nik Rivers, keyboardist Darren Moore, and drummer A.J. Chabidon. This lineup released Waking the Jester (2007), which contained two singles, "Shine On" and "Rise". The band resumed touring and, in 2009, released Harlequin's first live album, Live On/Q.

In 2013, Harlequin consisted of Belanger, guitarist Derrick Gottfried, drummer A.J. Chabidon, original keyboardist/guitarist Gary Golden, and bassist Paul McNair. This lineup lasted until roughly 2024, when McNair was replaced by Chris Burke-Gaffney. As of 2026, the band continues to tour, mostly within Canada.

== Members ==
=== Current ===
- George Belanger – vocals (1975—present)
- Gary Golden – keyboards, guitar (1975–1985, 2012–present)
- Derrick Gottfried – guitar (2007–present; substitute mid–2000s)
- A.J. Chabidon – drums (2007–present)
- Chris Burke-Gaffney – bass (2024–present)

=== Former members ===
- Ralph James – bass (1975–1985)
- David Budzak – drums (1975–1985), vocals (1975)
- Leroy Hawk – guitar (1975–1976)
- Glen Willows – guitar (1976–1985, 1987–2007)
- Randy Heibert – guitar (1986–1987)
- Randy Booth – bass (1986–1987)
- Ingemar Muench – keyboards (1986–1987)
- Rob Waite – drums (1987–2007)
- Steve Broadhurst – drums (1980s–2000s; substitute)
- M.J. Hutton – bass (1987–2007)
- Nik Rivers – keyboards (1987–2007), bass (2007–2013)
- Darren Moore – keyboards (2007–2012)
- Paul McNair – bass (substitute 2000s–2013, 2013–2024), guitar (substitute late 1990s–2000s)

== Discography ==
=== Studio albums ===
Year	Album	Track listing
1979	Victim of a Song	1 Sweet Things in Life; 2 Survive; 3 What's Your Name; 4 Victim of a Song; 5 You are the Light; 6 Who Knows (What a Love Can Do); 7 Shame Shame; 8 Turn Around; 9 Barely Alive
1980	Love Crimes	1 Innocence; 2 Love on the Rocks; 3 Thinking of You; 4 It's All Over Now; 5 Heaven (Dial 999); 6 Sayin' Goodbye to the Boys; 7 Wait for the Night; 8 Crime of Passion; 9 Can't Hold Back; 10 Midnight Magic
1982	One False Move	1 I Did It for Love; 2 Hard Road; 3 Shame If You Leave Me; 4 Say Goodnight; 5 Ready to Love Again; 6 Fine Line; 7 Heart Gone Cold; 8 Heavy Talk; 9 Superstitious Feeling; 10 It's a Woman You Need
1984	Harlequin	1 Take This Heart; 2 Keep This Fire Alive; 3 Don't Waste My Time; 4 Memories; 5 Can't Turn It Off; 6 Calling; 7 Trouble in Paradise; 8 Run for Your Life; 9 Love in Disguise
2004	Harlequin II	1 Sometimes I Feel; 2 Reach for the Stars; 3 Badlands; 4 Let Me In; 5 Don’t Break; 6 Money; 7 Fall So Right; 8 Do What You Say; 9 Trust the One
2007	Waking the Jester	1 Shine On; 2 Rise; 3 Hell or High Water; 4 40 Days in Your Car; 5 Black Out the Sun; 6 How Long; 7 This Limbo; 8 Take It or Leave It; 9 Lolita; 10 Inbound Train; 11 Little White Lies; 12 You Can't Go Back; 13 Taste It

=== Compilation albums ===
Year	Album	Track listing
1986	Harlequin - Radio Romances (Greatest Hits)	1 No Mystery; 2 Innocence; 3 Superstitious Feeling; 4 I Did It for Love; 5 Thinking Of You; 6 Take This Heart; 7 Sweet Things in Life; 8 Survive; 9 You Are the Light; 10 Heart Gone Cold
2009	Live On/Q	1 Waking The Jester; 2 I Did It for Love; 3 Sweet Things in Life; 4 You are the Light; 5 Rise; 6 Survive; 7 How Long; 8 Hell or High Water; 9 She's My Girl; 10 Shine On; 11 Inbound Train; 12 Thinking of You; 13 Superstitious Feeling; 14 Innocence

=== Live albums ===
Year	Album	Track listing
2009	Live On/Q	1 Intro; 2 I Did It For Love; 3 Sweet Things In Life; 4 You Are The Light; 5 Rise; 6 Survive; 7 How Long; 8 Hell or High Water; 9 She's My Girl 10 Shine On; 11 Inbound Train; 12 Thinking of You; 13 Superstitious Feeling; 14 Innocence

=== Singles ===
Year	Single	Peak chart positions	Album
Year	Single	CAN	Album
1979	"Survive"	87	Victim of a Song
1980	"You Are the Light"	78	Victim of a Song
1980	"Innocence"	29	Love Crimes
1981	"Thinking of You"	44	Love Crimes
1982	"Superstitious Feeling"	29	One False Move
1982	"I Did It for Love"	19	One False Move
1984	"Take This Heart"	64	Harlequin
1986	"It's No Mystery"	92	Greatest Hits
2007	"Shine On"	—	Waking the Jester
2007	"Rise"	—	Waking the Jester
"—" denotes releases that did not chart
