= The Good Brothers =

Canadian country, bluegrass and folk music group

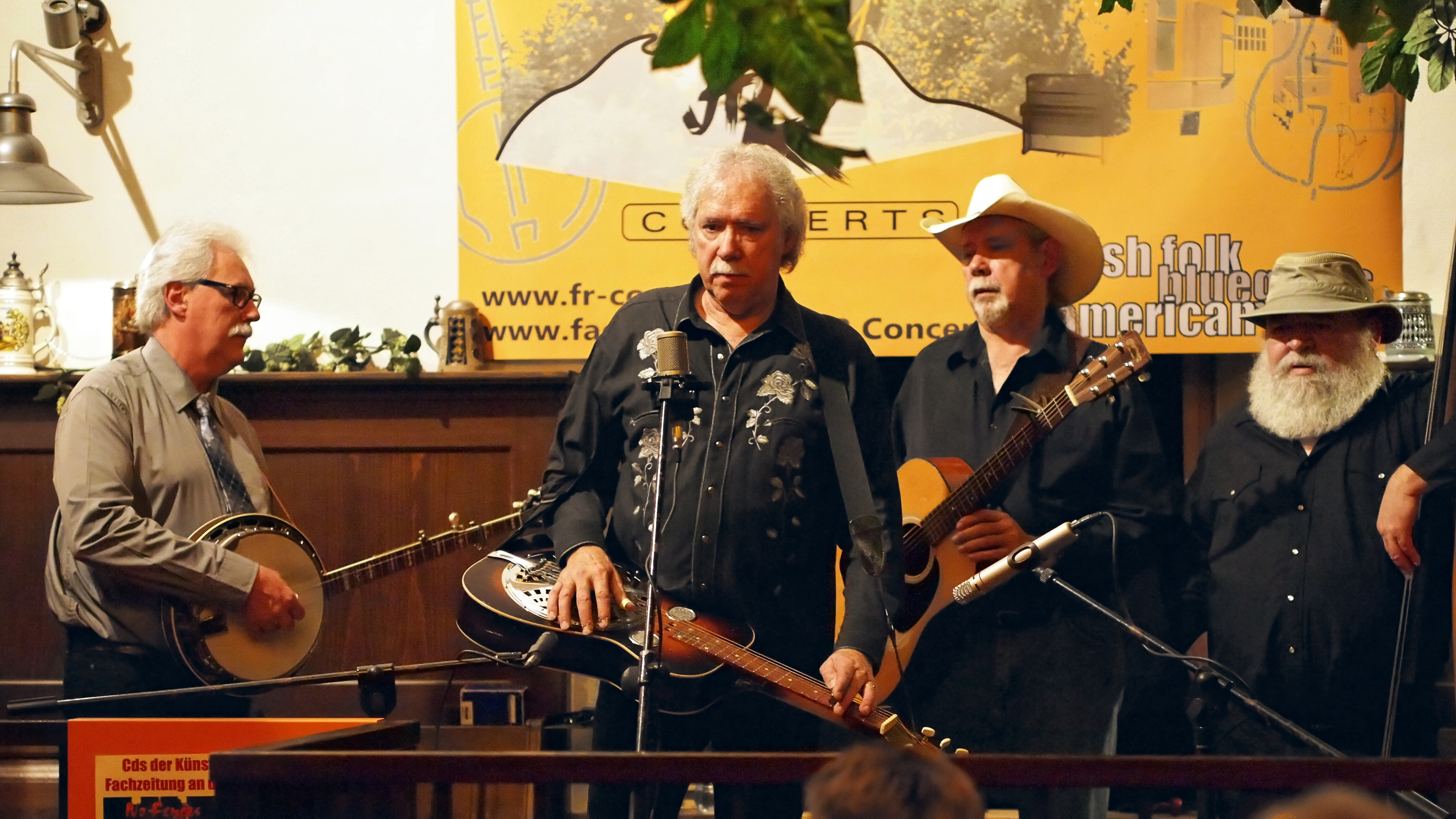
- The Good Brothers with Lou Moore on double bass in Kaufbeuren, Germany

Background information
- Origin: Richmond Hill, Ontario, Canada
- Genres: Country
- Years active: 1972–present
- Labels: Columbia, RCA, Solid Gold, Savannah, Hogtown
- Members: Brian Good; Bruce Good; Larry Good; Kevin Luciani; John P. Allen
- Website: thegoodbrothers.com

The Good Brothers are a Canadian country, bluegrass and folk music group originating from Richmond Hill, Ontario. The band's core members are Brian Good (guitar), his twin brother Bruce Good (autoharp), and younger brother Larry Good (banjo).

Brian and Bruce Good initially joined guitarist James Ackroyd to form the band James and the Good Brothers in 1967. Their self-titled album was released on Columbia Records in 1971. After a tour itinerary throughout North America, including a Toronto concert opening for Grand Funk Railroad, and another in San Diego opening for the Grateful Dead, the Goods wished to return to Canada while Ackroyd sought to continue in the United States.

In 1973, younger brother Larry Good joined the twins to form a new band which first performed 14 May 1974 in Toronto at The Riverboat club. Since then, the band has extensively toured Canada, United States and Europe. Their role in Canadian music was strengthened by winning the Juno Award for Country Group or Duo for eight consecutive years from 1977 to 1984.

In 1980, the group signed to Solid Gold Records. Their first two singles were covers - Van Morrison's Brown Eyed Girl, and Ace's How Long. While the latter single failed to chart, its B-side, an original song called Hot Knife Boogie, from their Live LP, recorded at Toronto's Horseshoe Tavern (as were both sides of the former single) and featuring The Powder Blues Band, was popular on college campus radio stations, and received some play on FM rock stations like Toronto's Q107. It would later be included on their 2008 compilation LP, Restricted Goods

The Good Brothers have been supplemented by other musicians over the years, such as John P. Allen (fiddle) and Bruce's son Travis Good of The Sadies (guitar and mandolin). Travis was a regular member of The Good Brothers when Larry took a leave of absence throughout the 1990s, this lineup used the alternate name "The Goods". Bruce and Larry were joined by Bruce's wife Margaret Good, Brian's daughter D'arcy Good, and all of The Sadies to record and perform live as "The Good Family" in 2013.

The 1988 single entitled "You Won't Fool This Fool This Time" was written by Bernie LaBarge. It reached No. 14 on the Canadian country charts.

The Good Brothers reached a younger generation of fans when Pat Burns (then coach of the Toronto Maple Leafs hockey team) joined them on-stage to play some music. Burns also played guitar on one of their albums.

In 1996, the Good Brothers provided entertainment at the Queen's Park Provincial Legislature's Canada Day celebrations in Toronto, Ontario.

In 2003, the Good Brothers performed at the Palmer Rapids Twin Festival, in Palmer Rapids, Ontario.

In 2006, the band released a gospel album, Blind Faith, and then headed out on their 29th tour of Europe.

In 2025, the Sadies and the Good Brothers collaborated on "Now That You're Gone", a tribute song to Bruce's son Dallas Good following his death in 2022.

== Discography ==
=== Albums ===
Year	Album	Chart Positions		CRIA	Label
Year	Album	CAN Country	CAN	CRIA	Label
1971	James and the Good Brothers	—	52	—	Columbia
1975	The Good Brothers	—	58	—	RCA Victor
1977	Pretty Ain’t Good Enuff	—	72	—	RCA Victor
1978	Doin' the Wrong Things Right	6	67	—	RCA Victor
1979	Some Kind of Woman	9	49	—	RCA Victor
1980	Best Of	11	95	—	RCA Victor
1980	Live	4	41	Gold	Solid Gold
1982	Person to Person	—	—	—	Solid Gold
1983	Live'n Kickin'	—	—	—	Solid Gold
1986	Delivering the Goods	—	—	—	Savannah
1990	Live Fast, Love Hard	—	—	—	Savannah
1994	So Many Roads (as The Goods)	22	—	—	Savannah
1996	Gone So Long (Live in Europe) (as The Goods)	—	—	—	ELA Music Group
2001	One True Thing	—	—	—	Outside Music
2005	Live at the Rattlesnake Saloon	—	—	—	Hogtown Records
2006	Blind Faith	—	—	—	Hogtown Records
2008	Restricted Goods	—	—	—	Hogtown Records
2013	The Good Family Album (as The Good Family)	—	—	—	Latent Recordings
2017	Wide Awake Dreamin'	—	—	—	Hogtown Records

=== Singles ===
Year	Title	Peak positions			Album
Year	Title	CAN Country	CAN	CAN AC	Album
1976	"That's the Kind of Man I Am"	20	—	—	The Good Brothers
1976	"Midnight Flight"	15	74	24	The Good Brothers
1977	"Homemade Wine"	14	—	—	The Good Brothers
1977	"Good Boogie"	—	—	—	The Good Brothers
1978	"Cowboy from Rue St. Germain"	30	—	—	Pretty Ain't Good Enuff
1978	"Truck Driver's Girl"	16	—	—	Doin' the Wrong Things Right
1978	"Please Come Back to Me"	—	25	12	Doin' the Wrong Things Right
1979	"Let Love Go"	45	—	—	Doin' the Wrong Things Right
1979	"Some Kind of Woman"	19	—	30	Some Kind of Woman
1980	"Brown Eyed Girl"	15	—	2	Live
1981	"Fox on the Run"	—	—	—	Live
1982	"Weekend Rodeo"	29	—	—	—N/a
1982	"Summertime"	6	—	—	Person to Person
1983	"Person to Person"	—	—	—	Person to Person
1983	"Hold Out"	27	—	—	Live 'n Kickin'
1984	"Celebrate"	—	—	—	—N/a
1986	"This Could Be Serious"	31	—	—	Delivering the Goods
1987	"Better Off Alone"	19	—	20	Delivering the Goods
1987	"High Rollin' Heart"	22	—	—	Delivering the Goods
1987	"Gone So Long"	8	—	—	Delivering the Goods
1988	"You Won't Fool This Fool This Time"	14	—	—	Delivering the Goods
1990	"Live Fast, Love Hard, Die Young"	14	—	—	Live Fast, Love Hard
1990	"She Told Me So"	10	—	—	Live Fast, Love Hard
1990	"Why Baby Why"	20	—	—	Live Fast, Love Hard
1991	"We Don't Always See Eye to Eye"	10	—	—	Live Fast, Love Hard
1994	"That's What Highways Are For" (as The Goods)	10	—	—	So Many Roads
1994	"I Really Dug Myself a Hole This Time" (as The Goods)	9	—	—	So Many Roads
1995	"The Shape I'm In" (as The Goods)	63	—	—	So Many Roads
1995	"Don't Know Much About Love" (as The Goods)	—	—	—	So Many Roads
2002	"What the Hell I've Got"	—	—	—	One True Thing
2002	"Honey and Heartache"	—	—	—	One True Thing
