= Juno Award for Single of the Year =

Canadian music award

The Juno Award for Single of the Year has been awarded since 1974 for the best single in Canada. It has also been known as Best Single and Best Selling Single. The award goes to the artist.

== Best Single (1974) ==
Year	Winner	Song	Nominees	Ref.
1974 – Pop	Terry Jacks	"Seasons in the Sun"	Gary and Dave, "Could You Ever Love Me Again"; Lighthouse, "Pretty Lady"; Anne Murray, "Danny's Song"; Ian Thomas, "Painted Ladies"	
1974 – Contemporary	Terry Jacks	"Seasons in the Sun"	Cliff Edwards, "Carpenter of Wood"; Peter Foldy, "Bondi Junction"; Gary and Dave, "Could You Ever Love Me Again"; Anne Murray, "Danny's Song"	
1974 – Country	Murray McLauchlan	"Farmer's Song"	Alabama, "Highway Driving"; Cliff Edwards, "Carpenter of Wood"; Jim and Don Haggart, "He"; George Hamilton IV, "Dirty Old Man"	
1974 – Folk	Murray McLauchlan	"Farmer's Song"	Gordon Lightfoot, "You Are What I Am"; Dave Nicol, "Goodbye Mama"; Valdy, "A Good Song"; Valdy, "Simple Man"	

== Best Selling Single (1975–1979) ==
Year	Winner	Song	Nominees	Ref.
1975	Terry Jacks	"Seasons in the Sun"	Paul Anka, "You're Having My Baby"; Bachman–Turner Overdrive, "You Ain't Seen Nothing Yet"; Andy Kim, "Rock Me Gently"; Wednesday, "Last Kiss"	
1976	Bachman–Turner Overdrive	"You Ain't Seen Nothing Yet"	Paul Anka, "I Don't Like to Sleep Alone"; Hagood Hardy, "The Homecoming"; The Stampeders, "Hit the Road Jack"	
1977	Sweeney Todd	"Roxy Roller"	André Gagnon, "Wow"; Patsy Gallant, "From New York to L.A."; THP Orchestra, "Theme from S.W.A.T."	
1978	Patsy Gallant	"Sugar Daddy"	April Wine, "You Won't Dance With Me"; Dan Hill, "Sometimes When We Touch"; Patrick Norman, "Let's Try Once More"; The Raes, "Que Sera Sera"	
1979	Nick Gilder	"Hot Child in the City"	Burton Cummings, "Break It to Them Gently"; Dan Hill, "Sometimes When We Touch"; Anne Murray, "You Needed Me"; Martin Stevens, "Love Is in the Air"	

== Single of the Year (1980–1998) ==
Year	Winner	Song	Nominees	Ref.
1980	Anne Murray	"I Just Fall In Love Again"	Claudja Barry, "Boogie Woogie Dancin Shoes"; Freddie James, "(Everybody) Get Up and Boogie"; Martin Stevens, "Midnight Music"; Streetheart, "Under My Thumb"	
1981	Martha and the Muffins	"Echo Beach"	Burton Cummings, "Fine State of Affairs"; Doug and the Slugs, "Too Bad - The Move"; The Rovers, "Wasn't That a Party"	
1981	Anne Murray	"Could I Have This Dance"	Burton Cummings, "Fine State of Affairs"; Doug and the Slugs, "Too Bad - The Move"; The Rovers, "Wasn't That a Party"	
1982	Loverboy	"Turn Me Loose"	Baron Longfellow, "Amour"; Chilliwack, "My Girl"; Powder Blues, "Thirsty Ears"; Rough Trade, "High School Confidential"	
1983	Payola$	"Eyes of a Stranger"	Loverboy, "Working for the Weekend"; Rush, "New World Man"; Straight Lines, "Letting Go"; Toronto, "Your Daddy Don't Know"	
1984	The Parachute Club	"Rise Up"	Bryan Adams, "Cuts Like a Knife"; Bryan Adams, "Straight from the Heart"; Corey Hart, "Sunglasses at Night"; Men Without Hats, "The Safety Dance"	
1985	Corey Hart	"Never Surrender"	Bryan Adams, "Run to You"; Gowan, "A Criminal Mind"; Luba, "Let It Go"; Gino Vannelli, "Black Cars"	
1986	Glass Tiger	"Don't Forget Me (When I'm Gone)"	Bryan Adams, "Diana"; Corey Hart, "Everything in My Heart"; Platinum Blonde, "Crying Over You"; Martine St. Clair, "L'Amour est dans tes yeux"	
1987	Glass Tiger	"Someday"	Bryan Adams, "Heat of the Night"; Corey Hart, "Can't Help Falling in Love"; Kim Mitchell, "Patio Lanterns"; Nuance, "Vivre dans la nuit"	
1988	No Juno Awards this year			
1989	Blue Rodeo	"Try"	Glass Tiger, "Diamond Sun"; Luba, "When a Man Loves a Woman"; Men Without Hats, "Pop Goes the World"; Sway, "Hands Up (Give Me Your Heart)"	
1990	Alannah Myles	"Black Velvet"	The Grapes of Wrath, "All the Things I Wasn't"; Candi, "Under Your Spell"; Kim Mitchell, "Rock n Roll Duty"; Alannah Myles, "Love Is"	
1991	Colin James	"Just Came Back"	Alias, "More Than Words Can Say"; Maestro Fresh-Wes, "Let Your Backbone Slide"; MCJ and Cool G, "So Listen"; The Northern Pikes, "She Ain't Pretty"	
1992	Tom Cochrane	"Life Is a Highway"	Bryan Adams, "Can't Stop This Thing We Started"; Bryan Adams, "(Everything I Do) I Do It For You"; Alanis, "Too Hot"; Glass Tiger, "Animal Heart"	
1993	Céline Dion and Peabo Bryson	"Beauty and the Beast"	Bryan Adams, "Thought I'd Died and Gone to Heaven"; Barenaked Ladies, "Enid"; Celine Dion, "If You Asked Me To"; Alannah Myles, "Song Instead of a Kiss"	
1994	The Rankin Family	"Fare Thee Well Love"	Celine Dion, "Love Can Move Mountains"; The Tragically Hip, "Courage"; Michelle Wright, "He Would Be Sixteen"; Neil Young, "Harvest Moon"	
1995	Jann Arden	"Could I Be Your Girl"	Bryan Adams, "Please Forgive Me"; Crash Test Dummies, "Mmm Mmm Mmm Mmm"; Celine Dion, "The Power of Love"; Moist, "Push"	
1996	Alanis Morissette	"You Oughta Know"	Bryan Adams, "Have You Ever Really Loved a Woman"; Susan Aglukark, "O Siem"; Jann Arden, "Insensitive"; Shania Twain, "Any Man of Mine"	
1997	Alanis Morissette	"Ironic"	Celine Dion, "Because You Loved Me"; Ashley MacIsaac, "Sleepy Maggie"; Amanda Marshall, "Birmingham"; The Tragically Hip, "Ahead by a Century"	
1998	Sarah McLachlan	"Building a Mystery"	Jann Arden, "The Sound Of"; Bran Van 3000, "Drinking in L.A."; Amanda Marshall, "Dark Horse"; Our Lady Peace, "Clumsy"	

== Best Single (1999–2002) ==
Year	Winner	Song	Nominees	Ref.
1999	Barenaked Ladies	"One Week"	Céline Dion, "My Heart Will Go On"; Matthew Good Band, "Apparitions"; Sarah McLachlan, "Adia"; Philosopher Kings, "Hurts to Love You"	
2000	The Tragically Hip	"Bobcaygeon"	Len, "Steal My Sunshine"; Matthew Good Band, "Hello Time Bomb"; Prozzäk, "Sucks to Be You"; The Tea Party, "Heaven Coming Down"	
2001	Nelly Furtado	"I'm Like a Bird"	Barenaked Ladies, "Pinch Me"; Jacksoul, "Can't Stop"; soulDecision, "Faded"; Treble Charger, "American Psycho"	
2002	Nickelback	"How You Remind Me"	Amanda Marshall, "Everybody's Got a Story"; Our Lady Peace, "Life"; Sloan, "If It Feels Good Do It"; Wave, "California"	

== Single of the Year (2003–present) ==
Year	Winner	Song	Nominees	Ref.
2003	Avril Lavigne	"Complicated"	Blue Rodeo, "Bulletproof"; Céline Dion, "A New Day Has Come"; Our Lady Peace, "Somewhere Out There"; Sam Roberts, "Brother Down"	
2004	Nelly Furtado	"Powerless (Say What You Want)"	Billy Talent, "Try Honesty"; Nickelback, "Someday"; Our Lady Peace, "Innocent"; Shaye, "Happy Baby"	
2005	k-os	"Crabbuckit"	Billy Talent, "River Below"; Finger Eleven, "One Thing"; The Trews, "Not Ready to Go"; Shania Twain with Mark McGrath, "Party for Two"	
2006	Michael Bublé	"Home"	Bedouin Soundclash, "When the Night Feels My Song"; Feist, "Inside and Out"; k-os, "Man I Used to Be"; Nickelback, "Photograph"	
2007	Nelly Furtado ft Timbaland	"Promiscuous"	Billy Talent, "Devil in a Midnight Mass"; Jim Cuddy, "Pull Me Through"; k-os, "Sunday Morning"; Chantal Kreviazuk, "All I Can Do"	
2008	Feist	"1234"	Jully Black, "Seven Day Fool"; Michael Bublé, "Everything"; Finger Eleven, "Paralyzer"; Avril Lavigne, "Girlfriend"	
2009	Kardinal Offishall	"Dangerous"	Divine Brown, "Lay It on the Line"; Michael Bublé, "Lost"; Céline Dion, "Taking Chances"; Nickelback, "Gotta Be Somebody"	
2010	Michael Bublé	"Haven't Met You Yet"	Billy Talent, "Rusted from the Rain"; Classified, "Anybody Listening"; Drake, "Best I Ever Had"; The Tragically Hip, "Love Is a First"	
2011	Young Artists for Haiti	"Wavin' Flag"	Classified, "Oh...Canada"; Drake, "Find Your Love"; Hedley, "Perfect"; k.d. lang, "Hallelujah (Vancouver Winter 2010)"	
2012	The Sheepdogs	"I Don't Know"	City and Colour, "Fragile Bird"; Hedley, "Invincible"; Nickelback, "When We Stand Together"; Johnny Reid, "Let's Go Higher"	
2013	Carly Rae Jepsen	"Call Me Maybe"	Billy Talent, "Viking Death March"; Hedley, "Kiss You Inside Out"; Serena Ryder, "Stompa"; The Sheepdogs, "The Way It Is"	
2014	Tegan and Sara	"Closer"	Arcade Fire, "Reflektor"; Classified ft. David Myles, "Inner Ninja"; Michael Bublé, "It's a Beautiful Day"; Serena Ryder, "What I Wouldn't Do"	
2015	Magic!	"Rude"	Drake feat. Majid Jordan, "Hold On, We're Going Home"; Hedley, "Crazy for You"; Kiesza, "Hideaway"; Sam Roberts Band, "We're All in This Together"	
2016	The Weeknd	"Can't Feel My Face"	Alessia Cara, "Here"; Drake, "Hotline Bling"; Justin Bieber, "What Do You Mean?"; Ria Mae, "Clothes Off"	
2017	The Strumbellas	"Spirits"	Alessia Cara, "Wild Things"; Drake feat. Wizkid & Kyla, "One Dance"; Shawn Mendes, "Treat You Better"; The Weeknd feat. Daft Punk, "Starboy"	
2018	Shawn Mendes	"There's Nothing Holdin' Me Back"	Arcade Fire, "Everything Now"; Arkells, "Knocking at the Door"; Alessia Cara, "How Far I'll Go"; The Weeknd, "I Feel It Coming"	
2019	Shawn Mendes	"In My Blood"	bülow, "Not a Love Song"; Alessia Cara, "Growing Pains"; Loud Luxury, "Body"; The Weeknd feat. Kendrick Lamar, "Pray for Me"	
2020	Shawn Mendes and Camila Cabello	"Señorita"	Bülow, "Sweet Little Lies"; Alessia Cara, "Out of Love"; Scott Helman, "Hang Ups"; Lennon Stella, "La Di Da"	
2021	The Weeknd	"Blinding Lights"	Brett Kissel, "Drink About Me"; JP Saxe feat. Julia Michaels, "If the World Was Ending"; Justin Bieber feat. Quavo, "Intentions"; Lennon Stella, "Kissing Other People"	
2022	Charlotte Cardin	"Meaningless"	Justin Bieber and Daniel Caesar ft. Giveon, "Peaches"; Jessia, "I'm Not Pretty"; Brett Kissel, "Make a Life, Not a Living"; The Weeknd, "Take My Breath"	
2023	The Weeknd	"Sacrifice"	Avril Lavigne, "Bite Me"; Tate McRae, "She's All I Wanna Be"; Shawn Mendes, "When You're Gone"; Preston Pablo feat. Banx & Ranx, "Flowers Need Rain"	
2024	Tate McRae	"Greedy"	Charlotte Cardin, "Confetti"; Daniel Caesar, "Always"; Lu Kala, "Pretty Girl Era"; TALK, "A Little Bit Happy"	
2025	Tate McRae	"Exes"	Karan Aujla, "Winning Speech"; Shawn Mendes, "Why Why Why"; Josh Ross, "Single Again"; The Weeknd and Playboi Carti, "Timeless"	
2026	Tate McRae	"Sports Car"	Justin Bieber, "Daisies"; Josh Ross, "Hate How You Look"; The Weeknd, "Cry for Me"; Cameron Whitcomb, "Options"	

== See also ==
- Music of Canada
