= Juno Awards of 1974 =

Canadian music awards ceremony

- Date: 25 March 1974
- Venue: Inn on the Park, Toronto, Ontario
- Hosted by: George Wilson

The Juno Awards of 1974, representing Canadian music industry achievements of the previous year, were awarded on 25 March 1974 in Toronto at a ceremony at the Inn on the Park's Centennial ballroom hosted by George Wilson of CFRB radio's Starlight Serenade programme.

No television broadcasts had yet been planned for the Junos, prompting the Canadian Recording Industry Association (CRIA) to plan an April 1974 ceremony entitled the Maple Music Awards. Amid some music industry criticism over the proposed competition of awards ceremonies, CRIA backed down from its own ceremonies in February 1974, about a month after the Maple Music Awards were announced. However, this situation forced Juno Awards founder Walt Grealis to prepare for television coverage of the 1975 Juno Awards.

== Nominees and winners ==
=== Best Female Vocalist ===
Winner: Anne Murray

Other nominees:

- Shirley Eikhard
- Patsy Gallant
- Susan Jacks
- Ginette Reno

=== Best Male Vocalist ===
Winner: Terry Jacks

Other nominees:

- Keith Hampshire
- Gordon Lightfoot
- Bob McBride
- Murray McLauchlan

=== Most Promising Female Vocalist of the Year ===
Winner: Cathy Young

Other nominees:

- Linda Brown
- Donna Moon
- Marie Claire Seguin
- Donna Warner
- Nancy White

There were a total of six nominees announced in this category, compared with the normal five nominees in other categories. No explanation for this situation was indicated.

=== Most Promising Male Vocalist of the Year ===
Winner: Ian Thomas

Other nominees:

- James Leroy
- Tom Middleton
- Dave Nicol
- Michael Tarry

=== Best Group ===
Winner: Lighthouse

Other nominees:

- Edward Bear
- Gary & Dave
- The Guess Who
- The Stampeders

=== Most Promising Group of the Year ===
Winner: Bachman–Turner Overdrive

Other nominees:

- Bearfoot
- Chester
- Scrubbaloe Caine
- Wednesday

=== Best Songwriter ===
Winner: Murray McLauchlan, "Farmer's Song"

Other nominees:

- Dave Beckett and Gary Weeks, "Could You Ever Love Me Again"
- Skip Prokop, "Pretty Lady"
- Bob Ruzicka, "Dirty Old Man"
- Ian Thomas, "Painted Ladies"

=== Best Country Female Artist ===
Winner: Shirley Eikhard

Other nominees:

- Carroll Baker
- Lynn Jones
- Diane Leigh
- Donna Moon

=== Best Country Male Artist ===
Winner: Stompin' Tom Connors

Other nominees:

- Gary Buck
- Dick Damron
- Ray Griff
- Ian Tyson

=== Best Country Group or Duo ===
Winner: The Mercey Brothers

Other nominees:

- Alabama
- Family Brown
- Jim and Don Haggart
- Humphrey and the Dumptrucks
- Mercey Brothers

=== Folk Singer of the Year ===
Winner: Gordon Lightfoot

Other nominees:

- Bruce Cockburn
- Murray McLauchlan
- Dave Nicol
- Valdy

=== Most Promising Folk Singer ===
Winner: Dave Nicol

- Peter Foldy
- Joe Probst
- Bob Ruzicka
- Ken Stolz

=== Best Independent Record Company of the Year ===
Winner: True North Records

Other nominees:

- Axe Records
- Daffodil Records
- Marathon Records
- Smile Records

=== Top Canadian Content Company of the Year ===
Winner: GRT of Canada Ltd.

=== Top Record Company of the Year ===
Winner: WEA Music of Canada Ltd.

=== Top Promotional Company of the Year ===
Winner: A&M Records of Canada Ltd.

== Nominated and winning albums ==
=== Contemporary Album of the Year ===
Winner: Bachman–Turner Overdrive, Bachman–Turner Overdrive

Other nominees:

- Can You Feel It, Lighthouse
- Danny's Song, Anne Murray
- From the Fire, The Stampeders
- Ian Thomas, Ian Thomas

=== Pop Music Album of the Year ===
Winner: Danny's Song, Anne Murray

Other nominees:

- Close Your Eyes, Edward Bear
- Gary & Dave, Gary & Dave
- Master Session, Moe Koffman
- Wish I Were a Plane, Laurie Bower Singers

=== Country Album of the Year ===
Winner: To It and At It, Stompin' Tom Connors

Other nominees:

- Countrified, Dick Damron
- Out West, George Hamilton IV
- Portrait, Family Brown
- Songs for Everyone, Ray Griff

=== Folk Album of the Year ===
Winner: Old Dan's Records, Gordon Lightfoot

Other nominees:

- Coast to Coast Fever, David Wiffen
- Country Man, Valdy
- Day to Day Dust, Murray McLauchlan
- Night Vision, Bruce Cockburn

== Nominated and winning releases ==
=== Best Single (Pop) ===
Winner: "Seasons in the Sun", Terry Jacks

Other nominees:

- "Could You Ever Love Me Again", Gary & Dave (Gary Weeks and Dave Beckett)
- "Danny's Song", Anne Murray
- "Painted Ladies", Ian Thomas
- "Pretty Lady", Lighthouse

=== Best Single (Contemporary) ===
Winner: "Seasons in the Sun", Terry Jacks

Other nominees:

- "Bondi Junction", Peter Foldy
- "Carpenter of Wood", Cliff Edwards
- "Could You Ever Love Me Again", Gary & Dave (Gary Weeks and Dave Beckett)
- "Danny's Song", Anne Murray

=== Best Single (Country) ===
Winner: "Farmer's Song", Murray McLauchlan

Other nominees:

- "Highway Driving", Alabama
- "Carpenter of Wood", Cliff Edwards
- "He", Jim and Don Haggart
- "Dirty Old Man", George Hamilton IV

=== Best Single (Folk) ===
Winner: "Farmer's Song", Murray McLauchlan

Other nominees:

- "A Good Song", Valdy
- "Goodbye Mama", Dave Nicol
- "Simple Man", Valdy
- "You Are What I Am", Gordon Lightfoot
