= Starchild (band) =

Canadian progressive rock band

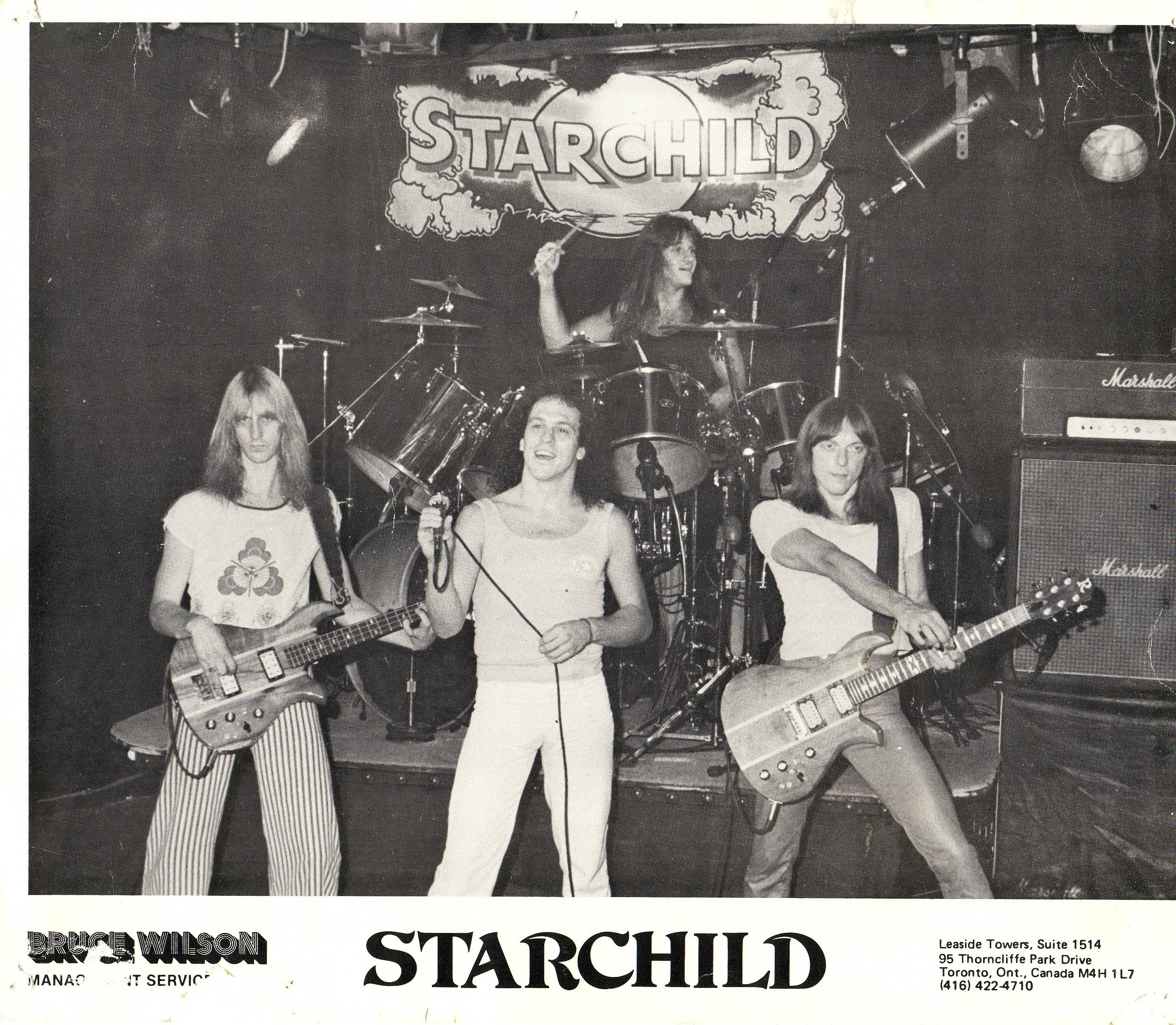

Background information
- Origin: Cambridge, Ontario, Canada
- Genres: Hard rock, progressive rock
- Years active: 1975–1982
- Labels: Tuesday Records, Axe Records, London Records

Starchild was a Canadian progressive rock band that released an LP record called Children of the Stars on the Toronto based Axe Records label in 1978, followed by a single "No Control for Rock-n-Roll" a few years later. Both records are quite rare and collectible.

The original line-up consisted of Rick Whittier (vocals), Bob Sprenger (guitars), Neil Light (bass), and Greg "Fritz" Hinz (drums). Hinz later joined Canadian rockers Helix and was replaced by Dixie Lee, formerly drummer of British rockers Lone Star, who was coming off a stint playing in Ozzy Osbourne's first solo project.

== History ==
Starchild was formed in 1975 in Cambridge, Ontario when Bob Sprenger, Rick Whittier, and Neil Light, who played in a steady gigging band called Gaslight, decided to reform as a heavier rock band. The name of the band came from the Starchild Trilogy written by Frederik Pohl and Jack Williamson. Most of the band members were science fiction fans, and when the band's producer Greg Hambleton (who also signed Steel River to his Tuesday Records Tuesday label) wanted something more futuristic sounding than the previous name, Thorne. The name change to Starchild was unanimous. After going through a few different drummers, they hired Greg "Fritz" Hinz and hit the road full-time.

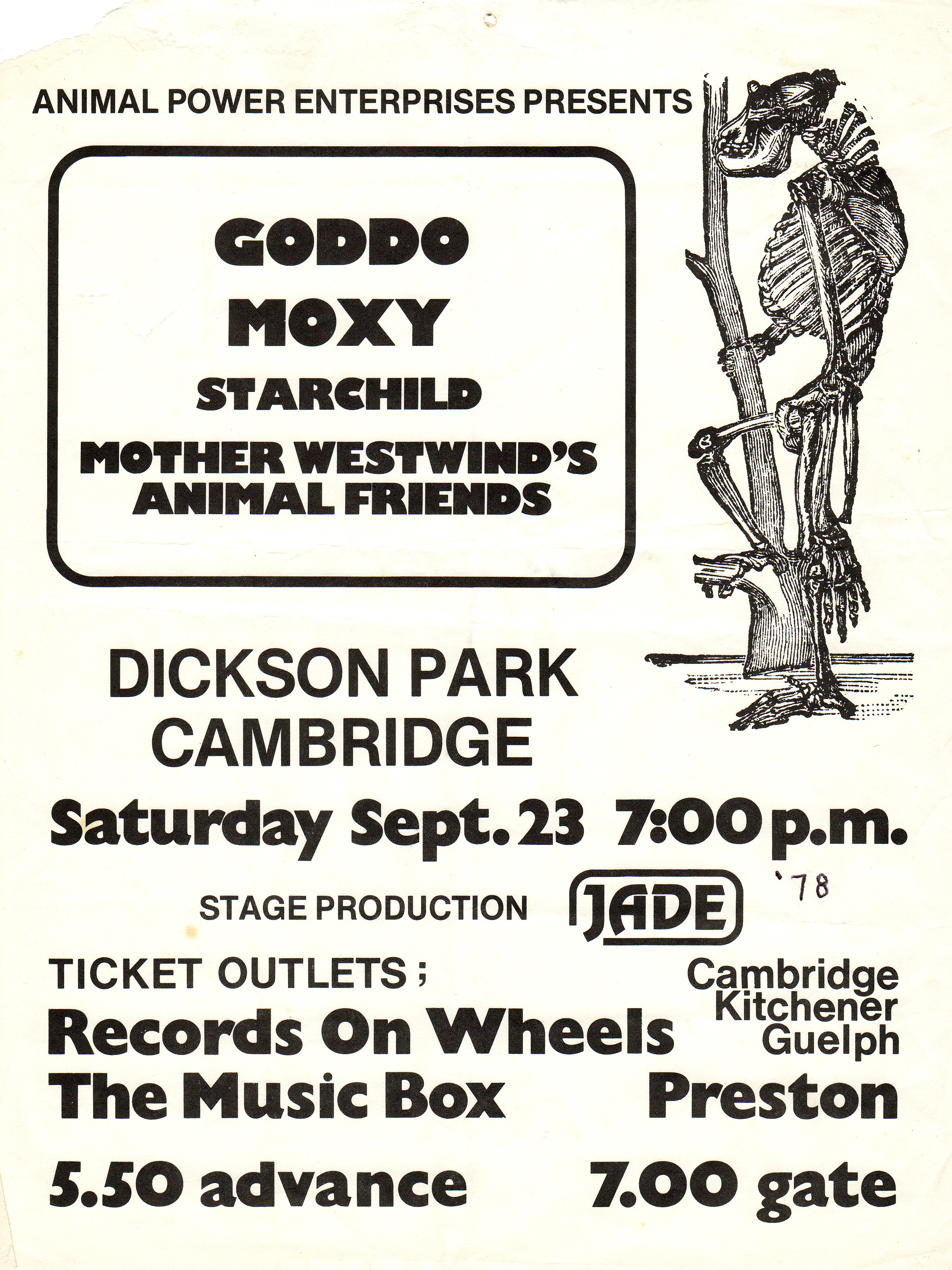

The band's first recording was a two-song demo ("Party of the Toads" and "Tough Situation") produced and engineered by a young Daniel Lanois in his mother's basement in Ancaster in 1976. Lanois went on to produce U2, Peter Gabriel, and Brian Eno among others.

Children of the Stars was recorded in Toronto in the autumn of 1977 and released in early 1978. The band opened for fellow Canadian rockers Triumph, Goddo, and Moxy as well as others.

The album received moderate airplay across the country after release, mostly as promotion for the band's live appearances. Due to the fact there were no radio friendly commercial songs released as a charted single, it did not chart. Being a progressive rock style outfit (influenced by other Canadian acts such as Rush and Saga) in an age of disco and new wave music was detrimental to their progress.

Neil Light left the band for family reasons in 1979 and was replaced by Bill Mair, and later, Toronto native Wayne Brown. Fritz left to join Helix a few months later and was replaced by Dixie Lee. Starchild continued to tour across Canada, and although the band never made it to Europe, their records sold better there than they did in Canada. The single "No Control for Rock-n-Roll" was covered by a band from the Netherlands in the 1980s.

In early 1982, the band went into Metalworks Studios owned and operated by Triumph's Gil Moore, and recorded a two-song demo ("Steamroller Rock", "I Need A Woman Tonight") to shop for a new record label. Their contract with Axe Records was mutually ended because the label wanted the band to change their look and musical style to the new wave trend, that was becoming popular due to the success of bands including The Knack. The band however wanted no part of that and decided to go in more of a heavy metal direction, influenced by bands such as Judas Priest and Iron Maiden.

Toronto-based Attic Records were interested in signing the band but road fatigue took its toll, and Starchild split up in the summer of 1982 just before its Toronto audition for Attic. In the seven years between formation and breakup in 1982, Starchild toured across Canada constantly.

Bob Sprenger and Neil Light formed the band Thief in the Night in 1985, opening for Trooper and Platinum Blonde and others before disbanding in 1990.

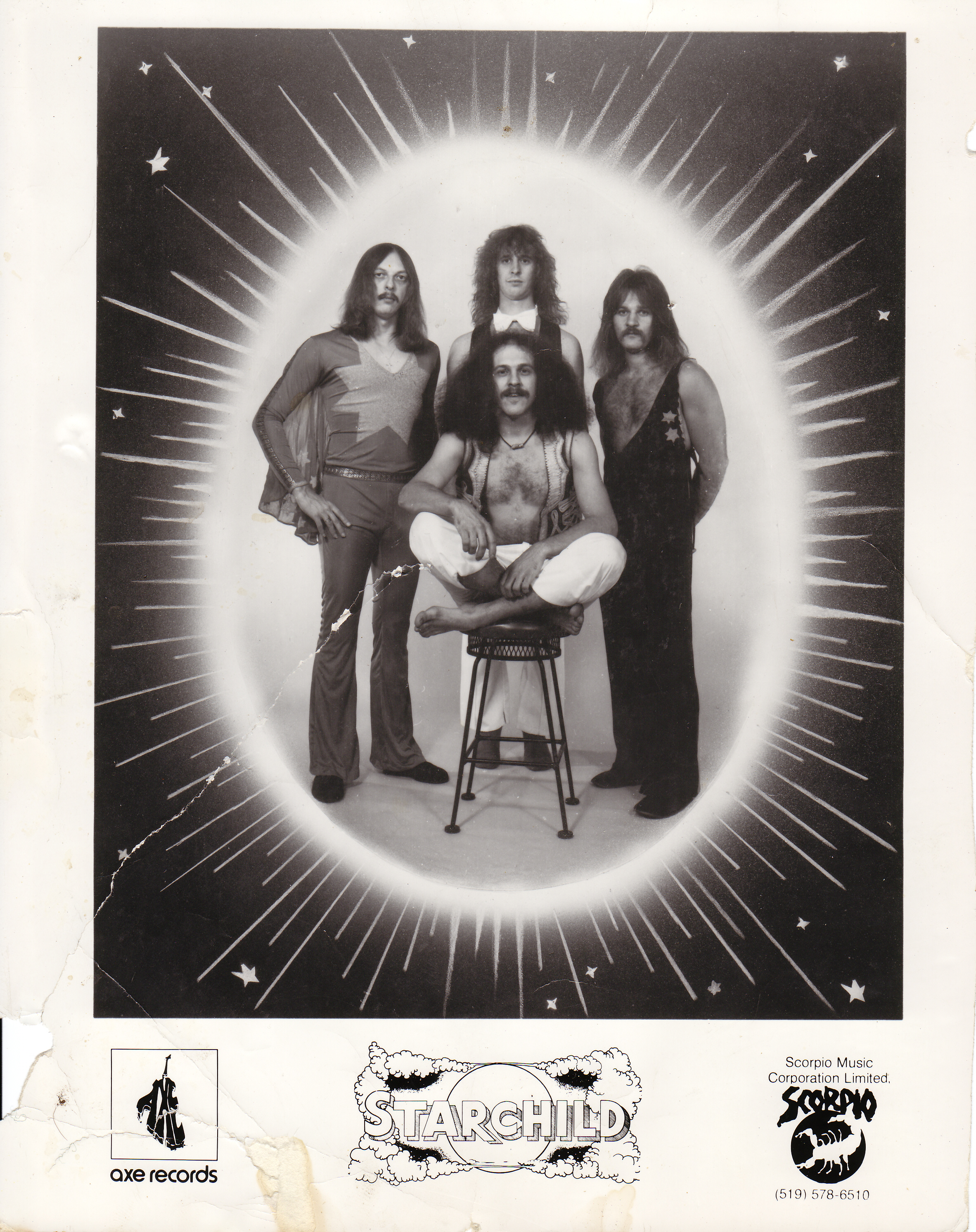

Sprenger recorded two CDs with power trio Distant Thunder in the early 1990s, and reunited with original Starchild bass player Neil Light, to form the rock cover band Wake the Giants in 2001. With Canadian comedian Ron Pardo (History Bites) on drums and his brother Jason on lead vocals, as well as new bass player Sam Barber (who replaced Light in 2011) the band did mostly covers including material from the Children of the Stars LP but disbanded in August 2014. Sprenger is also the lead guitarist for a vocalist/keyboardist from London Ontario named Kathryn Marquis. They recorded and released a live CD Your Kingdom Come in 2011 and recorded a CD called Fire, which included a Sprenger written song, "Purest Love". It was his first recorded and published song since the Starchild days.

Lead vocalist and founding member Rick Whittier died on September 18, 2015, after a lengthy battle with chronic obstructive pulmonary disease.

After being contacted in the summer of 2023 by the Greek record label Sonic Age/Cult Metal Classics, Sprenger sent some unreleased demos recorded in the early 1980s to them. They released them in LP and CD formats called Steamroller in 2024. The LP contained eight tracks including the three song demo recorded at Metalworks plus five songs recorded in a rehearsal hall a few months later. The CD also contained some bonus tracks including a drum and bass solo.

Starchild's original drummer Greg Fritz Hinz died of cancer on February 16, 2024.

== Members ==
- Vocals - Rick Whittier
- Guitars - Bob Sprenger
- Bass guitar - Neil Light, Bill Mair, Wayne Brown,
- Drums - Bill Coutts, Greg "Fritz" Hinz, Dixie Lee

== Discography ==
=== Demos ===
- "Party of the Toads" / "Tough Situation" (1976, produced by Daniel Lanois)
- "Steamroller Rock" / "I Need A Woman Tonight" / "Teaser" (1982)

=== Albums ===
- Children of the Stars (1978, Axe Records distributed by London Records of Canada)
- Steamroller (2024, Cult Metal Classics distributed by Sonic Age Records of Greece)

=== Single ===
- "No Control for Rock-N-Roll" b/w "Detroit Rocker" (1981, Tuesday Records)
