= Madrigal (band) =

Canadian rock band

- Origin: Ontario, Canada
- Genres: Rock
- Years active: 1968 to 1973, 1975
- Labels: Tuesday, SSS International, Axe
- Past members: Peter Boynton; Rick Henderson; Don Simpson; John Swainson

Madrigal was a Canadian band who had a 1970 hit in two different charts with "I Believe in Sunshine". Their album also made the charts the following year.

== Background ==
Formed in 1968, the Ontario group was made up of John Swainson on guitar, bass & vocals, Rick Henderson on guitar & vocals, Peter Boynton on piano, organ, bass, keyboards & vocals, and Don Simpson on drums.

The group was pictured on the front cover of the RPM Weekly October 17, 1970 issue.

They had success with the single "I believe in Sunshine" which was produced by Greg Hambleton.

This group has no connection to the Los Angeles group Madrigal who released the single, "Need I Say" bw "Feelings Before" on Zipperman's Public! record label in 1970.

== Career ==
In early September 1970, the group was booked to appear at the Rock Hill Rock-In festival that ran from the 5th to the 6th. Other groups that were booked to appear there were Sound Spectrum from London, Ontario, Mud Flat from Toronto, and Pour Soul from England.

=== "I Believe in Sunshine" ===
The single, "I Believe in Sunshine" bw "Lady" was issued on Tuesday GH 102X in September 1970. Entering the chart at #94 on October 3, 1970, it peaked at #16 on the eighth week. It spent a total of seventeen weeks in the chart. The single also got to #5 on the Top 50 MAPL Canadian chart on 24th of October. The following week, the Top 50 MAPL chart became the Top 30 MAPL chart and the single was at #2. It held the #2 spot for another two weeks but this time in the Top 20 MAPL Chart. By the 21st, the MAPL chart wasn't being published. The single at that time was at #16 in the RPM 100 chart.

The single was issued in the US on SSS International SSS-824 . "I Believe In Sunshine" had been originally recorded and released by A Passing Fancy in August 1967. The original version made #50 in the RPM Top Singles chart and #28 in the CHUM (Toronto) chart in autumn 1967. Both versions were produced by songwriter Greg Hambleton.

=== Album ===
It was mentioned in the December 10, 1970 issue of Billboard that their forthcoming album Sunshine and Baked Beans was to be released mid that month and would include the hit single. The album was issued on Tuesday 1002. The album made the RPM 100 Albums chart and got to #68 on February 13, 1971. It got a release in the US as a self-titled album on SSS International SSS-18. It was given a four star rating by Billboard in the magazine's July 3 issue.

=== Further activities ===
In December 1970, Madrigal and Tuesday Records labelmates Steel River were ready to tour Quebec and the Maritimes. Also they were to appear in a CKFH promoted charity-related concert that was held at Massey Hall on the 20th. Other artists on the list were Ronnie Hawkins, Everyday People, Steel River and Tommy Graham.

They followed up with another single, "Hallelujah" bw "Freedom" which wasn't on the album. The US release was on SSS International SSS-845.

In 1973 the group broke up. It was recreated in 1975 with a different line up. This only lasted a short time, and the group broke up again. Peter Boynton became part of the group Red Rider which included Tom Cochrane.

== Discography ==
Canadian singles
Act	Title	Cat	Year	Notes #
Madrigal	"I Believe in Sunshine" / "Lady"	Tuesday GH 102X	1970	
Madrigal	"Hallelujah" / "Freedom"	Tuesday GH 111X	1971	
Madrigal	"I Believe in Sunshine" / "Lady"	Tuesday Golden Treasures GH GT 100X		

US singles
Act	Title	Cat	Year	Notes #
Madrigal	" I Believe in Sunshine" / "Lady"	SSS International SSS-824	1970	
Madrigal	"Hallelujah" / "Freedom"	SSS International SSS-845	1970	

Canadian albums
Act	Title	Cat	Year	Notes #
Madrigal	Sunshine and Baked Beans	Tuesday Records GHL 1002	1970	
Madrigal	Sunshine	Axe Records A538	2016	

US albums
Act	Title	Cat	Year	Notes #
Madrigal	Madrigal	SSS International SSS-18	1970	
