= Bill Durst =

- Genres: Rock, blues rock, blues
- Occupations: Singer, songwriter, guitarist
- Instruments: Guitar, vocals
- Years active: 1970–present
- Formerly of: Thundermug; Tres Hombres; The Brains; Big on Venus

Bill Durst is a Canadian blues artist. He was one of the founding members of the band Thundermug. Since 1983, he has also released several solo albums.

== History ==
Bill Durst, based on London, Ontario, Canada, co-founded the band Thundermug in 1970. The band existed from 1970 to 1976 and again from 1991 to 2001, releasing five albums and two Top 40 Canadian singles. Thundermug went on hiatus in 1976, after releasing three albums. During this hiatus period, Durst joined a ZZ Top tribute band called Tres Hombres. He was later a member of The Brains, a band that released one album in 1980 through Falcon Records. In 1983, Durst released a solo album, Call Billy, through Passport Records His second solo album, Father Earth, was released exclusively on cassette in 1989 through independent label Cottage Records.

Thundermug reunited in 1991, but split up again in 2001. The Thundermug name was formally retired in 2000, and the band continued for a period thereafter as Big on Venus. During the 1991–2001 period, two further albums were released by the band, featuring Durst, which resulted in three charting singles. Both during this period of band re-formation and following the final breakup of the band, Durst continued his solo career. In 2005, he released The Wharncliffe Sessions independently through his label Durstwerks. In 2006, as a member of Thundermug, Durst was inducted into the London Music Hall of Fame. In 2009 and 2012, Durst released The Great Willy Mammoth and Bill Durst Live, respectively. In 2012, Durst won the London Music Award for most popular blues/R&B artist. In 2013, Durst was a featured performer at the Montreal International Jazz Festival. In 2014, Durst received the Jack Richardson Music Award for best blues/R&B performer.

== Discography ==
=== Solo ===
- Call Billy (1983)
- Father Earth (1989)
- The Wharncliffe Sessions (2005)
- The Great Willy Mammoth (2009)
- Bill Durst Live (2012)
- Hard And Heavy (2013)
- Good Good Lovin (2015)

=== With Thundermug ===
- Thundermug Strikes (1972)
- Orbit (1973)
- Ta-Daa (1974)
- Who's Running My World (1995)
- Bang The Love Drum (1997)

=== With The Brains ===
- Audio Extremo (1980)
