= Old Dan =

Old Dan can refer to:

- Old Dan's Records, an album by Gordon Lightfoot
- Old Dan Tucker, an American song
- Old Dan, a hound from Where the Red Fern Grows
