= Charity Brown =

Canadian singer, actress and voice artist

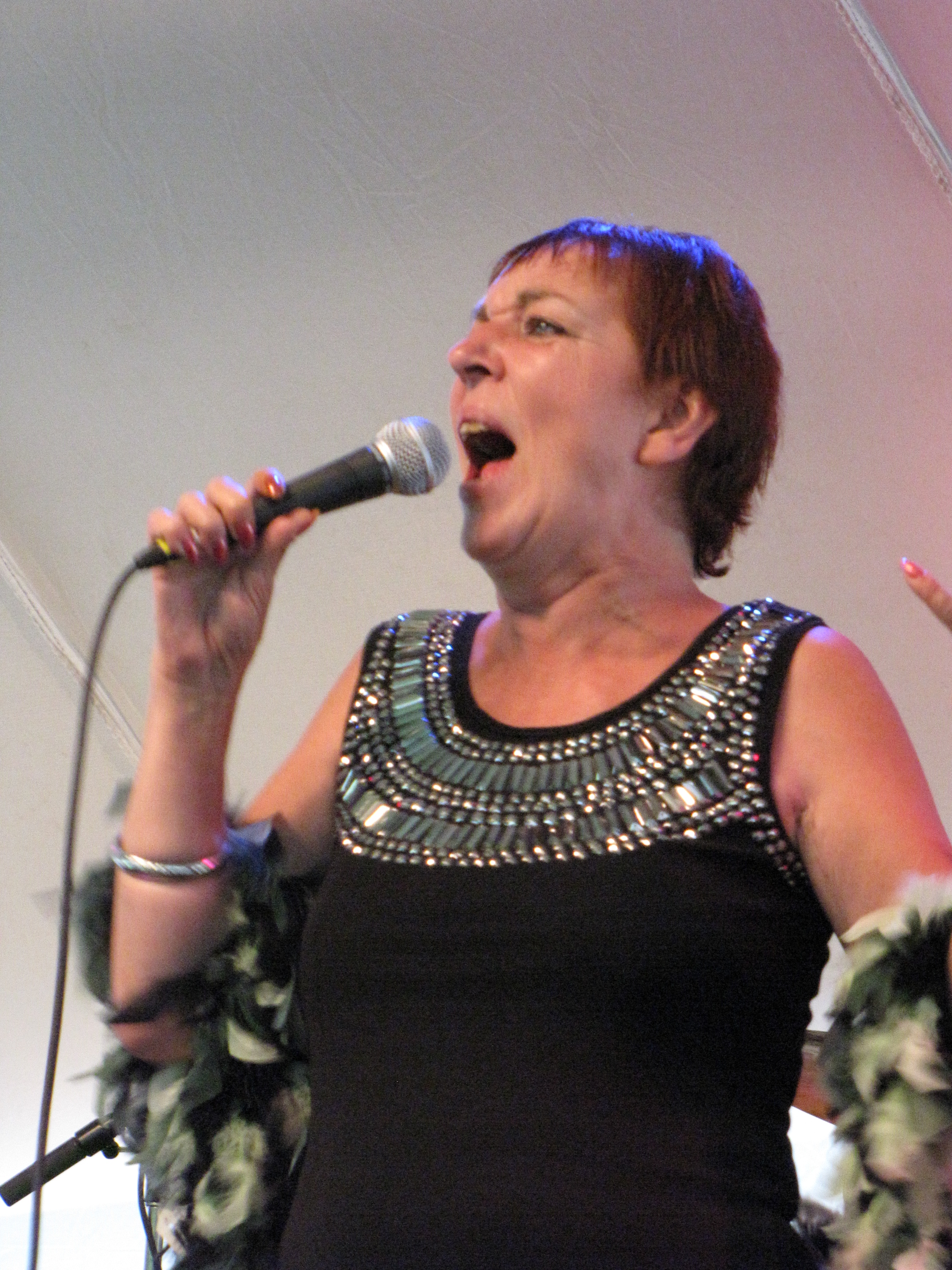
- Brown performing at the Kitchener Blues Festival

Background information
- Born: Phyllis Boltz Kitchener, Ontario, Canada
- Occupations: Actress; singer
- Instrument: Vocals
- Years active: 1970-1979
- Website: www.charitybrown.ca

Charity Brown (born Phyllis Boltz in Kitchener, Ontario) is a Canadian film actress, singer, and voice artist for television animation shorts. She is one of Eastwood Collegiate Institute's notable alumni.

== Biography ==
Charity Brown began singing with local bands while still in high school in Kitchener, Ontario in the late 1960s. She performed and recorded under the name Phyllis Brown until 1973. Around 1970 she became the lead vocalist for Rain, a popular Kitchener-based rock band. Rain scored a #22 hit in Canada in 1971 with "Out of My Mind", written by Greg Hambleton and released on Axe Records. She left Rain in 1973 to focus on her solo career. Her Motown-flavoured brand of white soul was produced by Harry Hinde and was strong enough to secure her a contract with A&M Records. It was at this time she changed her stage name to Charity Brown.

Her two original studio albums with A&M produced four top ten hits in Canada, including the #5 hit "Take Me in Your Arms (Rock Me a Little While)". "Take Me in Your Arms" was a Holland-Dozier-Holland composition that had been an R&B hit for Kim Weston in 1965 and The Isley Brothers in 1968. Charity Brown released her single in mid-April 1975, about a week before the Doobie Brothers released the same song in the US. The Doobie Brothers version peaked at number 11 in the US but was overshadowed in Canada by Brown's release. The Doobie Brothers peaked at number 35 in Canada only after Brown's version began to leave the charts.

During the 1980s, Brown performed as a voice artist for Atkinson Film-Arts TV specials and programmes including The Velveteen Rabbit, Rumpelstiltskin, Dennis the Menace and The Adventures of Teddy Ruxpin.

She also made a guest appearance on The Alan Thicke Show and appeared with a number of top Canadian female recording artists on the CBC Television special Anne Murray's Ladies Night in 1979.

After a twenty-year hiatus from music, she began performing again in southern Ontario, including a performance at the 2007 Kitchener Blues Festival. She released an album of material recorded in 1979 but never before released. She also released a sampler called Wings of Time, featuring two original tracks. A new full album was promised, but has not yet been released.

== Awards ==
Charity Brown was nominated for the Most Promising Female Vocalist award at the 1975 Juno Awards, the top music award in Canada. She was nominated again in 1976, 1977 and 1978 for Best Female Vocalist.

== Albums ==
As Phyllis Brown:

- Phyllis Brown (album), 1971

With Rain:

- Rain (Axe Records, 1972) Peak chart position in Canada: # 49

Solo:

- Rock Me (A&M Records, 1975) # 52
- Stay With Me (A&M, 1976) # 76
- The Best of Charity Brown (A&M, 1977)
- Lost Tapes of 79 (Sweet Home Records, 2006)
- Wings Of Time (2011)

== Singles ==
With Rain:

- "Out of My Mind" (London Records, 1971). Peak chart position in Canada: # 22
- "Stop Me from Believing" (Axe Records, 1972): # 71

Solo:

- "Jimmy Mack" (A&M Records, 1974) # 9
- "You Beat Me to the Punch" (A&M, 1974) # 9
- "Take Me In Your Arms" (A&M, 1975) # 5
- "No Way To Treat A Lady" (A&M, 1975) # 54
- "Saving All My Love" (A&M, 1976) # 61
- "Anyway You Want" (A&M, 1976) # 6
- "Stay With Me" (A&M, 1976) # 61
- "Ain't No Hurt Love Can't Heal (A&M, 1977) # 72
- "Forecast" (A&M, 1977) # 53
- "All the Things You Told Me (A&M, 1977) # 39 Adult Contemporary

== Band members of Rain ==
Phyllis Brown (Charity Brown), Charlie Hall, Chris Woroch, Ron Hiller, Bernie LaBarge, Bill McLaughlin, Brian LeBlanc
