= Dirty Old Man =

Single by George Hamilton IV

from the album Out West Country
- B-side: "Abilene"
- Released: April 1973
- Genre: Country
- Label: RCA
- Songwriter(s): Bob Ruzicka

George Hamilton IV singles chronology
"Blue Train (Of the Heartbreak Line)" (1973)	"Dirty Old Man" (1973)	"Second Cup of Coffee" (1973)

"Dirty Old Man" is a single performed by American country music artist George Hamilton IV, and written by Canadian songwriter Bob Ruzicka. Released in April 1973, it was a single from Hamilton's album Out West Country. The song reached No. 1 on the RPM Country Tracks chart in Canada on June 2, 1973. A version by Valdy reached No. 38 in Canada in 1978.

The song was a Juno Award nominee for Country Single of the Year at the Juno Awards of 1974.

== Chart performance ==
Chart (1973)	Peak position
U.S. Billboard Hot Country Singles	38
Canadian RPM Country Tracks	1
Canadian RPM Adult Contemporary	2
