= Poor Souls (band) =

Scottish band

The Poor Souls
- Years active: 1965–1967; 196?–197?
- Labels: Decca, Quality
- Spinoff of: The Johnny Hudson Hi-Four

Poor Souls was a Scottish band who had a hit in the UK, broke up and then re-emerged as a Canadian band who recorded for the Quality Records label, and two hits in 1970 with "Lookin’ Round", and "Comin' Round". They also had another with "Land of the Few".

== Background ==
The group's history goes back to Dundee, Scotland when a group called The Johnny Hudson Hi-Four aka The Hi-Four was formed. When another musician, Chick Taylor came on board, the name was changed to The Poor Soul. The UK line up consisted of John Moran (aka Johnny Hudson) on guitar & vocals, Doug Martin on bass & vocals, Chick Taylor on guitar & keyboards and John Casey on drums & vocals.

After signing with Decca in 1965, they recorded the single, "When My Baby Cries" which was released in June that year on Decca F 12183. The song was a climber for the week ending, Sunday 11 July 1965.

In 1966, they were signed to ALP Records. In July, they had chart success with "Love Me". The group toured the US military bases in East Anglia. In late 1966 the label went into receivership.

The group later went to Rome and played there for a while before breaking up in 1967. Three members, John Moran, Chick Taylor and John Casey went to Canada and settled in Toronto, recording for the Quality label.

== Career ==
=== Recordings ===
In 1970, the Canadian group had the single, "Lookin’ Round" backed with "Scarecrow" released on Quality 1959X. For the week ending 4 July, the single peaked at #3 in the Top 50 MAPL Canadian chart. It also peaked at #28 on 11 July in the RPM 100 singles chart.

They followed up with the similarly-titled single, "Comin’ Round" by "Workin’ Man" on Quality 1980X. The group was pictured with CKFH's John Donabie in 20 June issue of RPM Weekly. At that time their single was at #73 in the RPM 100 chart. The single, which was produced by Barry Keane, had the label behind it in an interesting promotion. In a promotion that was described as an attention-getter, Canadian radio personalities were sent an engraved tin cup and pencils with "give to the poor souls" on the cup. Don O'Neil, the program director of CHEX contacted Lee Farley of Quality Records to let him know that it worked. This exercise paid off for the group in the charts. For the week ending 31 October, the single peaked at #14 on the Top 30 MAPL Canadian chart. It also entered the RPM 100 Singles chart at #76.

In 1971, "Land of the Few" by "No More" was released on Quality 1998X. On the week ending 5 June, it was at #71 in the RPM 100 Singles chart.

=== Venues ===
Along with Rotary Connection, Brutus and Chimo!, they were booked to appear at the Midsummer Night's Rock Fest which ran from Friday 26 June 1970 to Sunday 5 July 1970 in Michigan. Later that year they were booked to appear at the Rock Hill Rock-In festival that ran from 5 September to 6 September that year. Other groups that were booked to appear there were Sound Spectrum from London, Ontario, Mud Flat from Toronto, Madrigal from Hamilton and April from Orangeville.

In 1971, Poor Souls along with Leigh Ashford, Bruce Cockburn and Tim Hardin were the acts to play an 4 April benefit concert for group Srynx who lost most of their equipment in a fire.

== Break up ==
The group broke up after John Moran's wife died in an automobile accident.

== Later years ==
By 1973, John Moran was signed to Columbia Records. He had recorded an album, Come Join Me and had released a single of the same name which was in the progressive rock mode.

== Discography ==
UK group singles
Act	Release	Catalogue	Year	Notes #
Poor Souls	"When My Baby Cries" / "My Baby's Not There"	Decca F 12183	1965	
Poor Souls	"Love Me" / "Please Don’t Change Your Mind"	Alp Records 595004	1966	

Canadian group singles
Act	Release	Catalogue	Year	Notes #
Poor Souls	"Lookin' Round" / "Scarecrow"	Quality 1959X	1970	
Poor Souls	"Comin’ Round" / "Workin’ Man"	Quality 1980X	1970	
Poor Souls	"Land of the Few" /" No More"	Quality 1998X	1971	

== Members ==
UK

- John Moran (aka Johnny Hudson) – guitar, vocals
- Doug Martin – bass, vocals
- Chick Taylor – guitar, keyboards
- John Casey – drums, vocals

Canada

- John Moran – guitar, vocals
- Mike McDonald – guitar
- Martin Soldat – keyboards
- John Slorach – bass
- Tommy Frew drums
- Ron Ray – drums (replaced Tommy Frew)
