= Sattalites =

Canadian reggae group

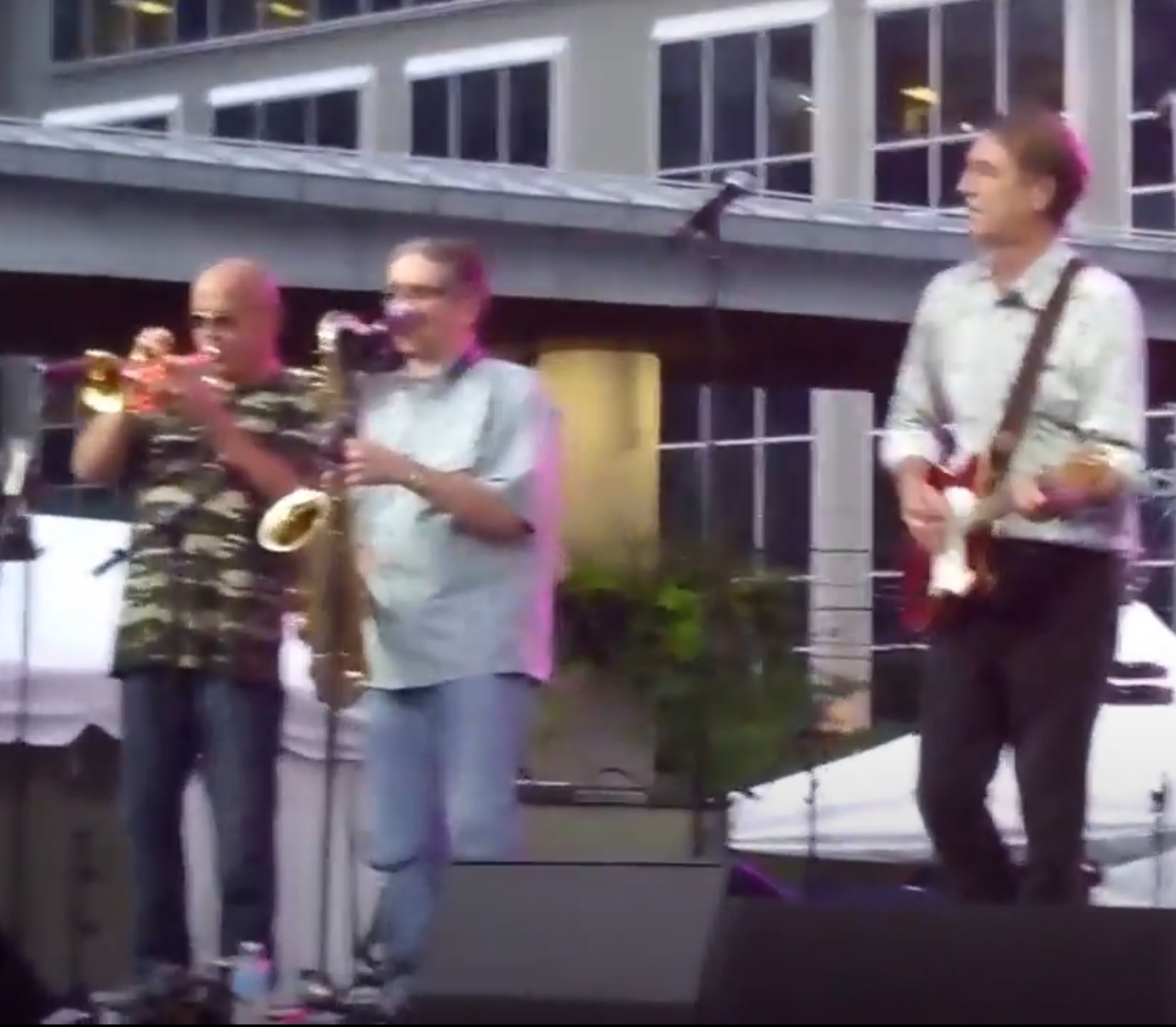
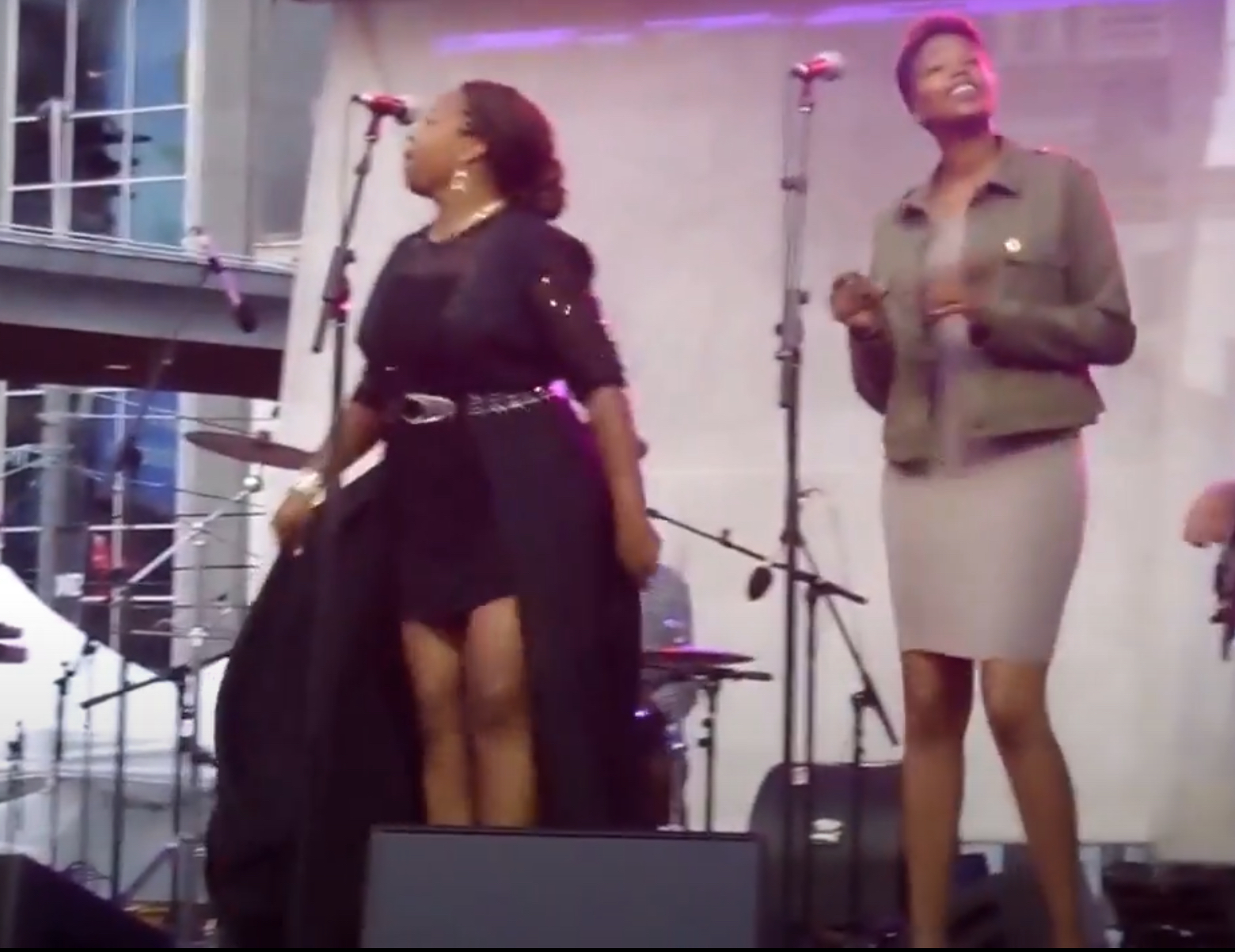
- The Sattalites performing in 2018

Background information
- Origin: Toronto, Ontario, Canada
- Genres: Reggae
- Years active: 1981–present
- Labels: Axe, Risqué Disque, Intrepid, Solid Gold
- Members: Fergus Hambleton; David Fowler; Bruce McGillivray; Junior McPherson; Rick Morrison
- Past members: Jo Jo Bennett (died 2021); Bruce 'Preacher' Robinson (died December 5, 2011); Felix Taylor; Neville Francis; Neil Chapman

The Sattalites are a Canadian reggae group. Founded in Toronto, Ontario as a music school in 1981, the band has become one of the most successful Canadian reggae ensembles. They signed with the Canadian record label Solid Gold Records early in their career and have been with them ever since. Their style has been described as a radio-friendly combination of lover's rock and dancehall.

== History ==
Founding members Fergus Hambleton and Jo Jo Bennett first met as backing musicians, supporting the trio of Tony Tuff, Cornell Campbell and George Faith in concert. Hambleton had previous played horns live for other top reggae artists such as Horace Andy and Barrington Levy.

The pair began performing together, mixing Bennett's instrumentals with Hambleton's smooth alto voice to create the Sattalites' sound. In tandem, the band started as a teaching group who opened the Sattalites Music School on a pay-what-you-can basis to spread their influence in 1981. The Sattalites consisted of various types of students from the school who wanted a sense of live performing. By 1982, the Sattalites had melded into a collaboration of musicians from talented beginners to experienced pros, some of whom still perform.

They became very well known for their enthusiastic live performances which initiated their extensive touring across Canada and the United States. In 1987, the Satallites performed at the inaugural edition Edgefest, presented by Toronto radio station CFNY-FM. The band were invited back to play at Edgefest in 1990 as well.

The Sattalites were the only Canadian band ever invited to play at Jamaica's "Sunsplash", playing before 25,000 people. They also performed at the 1993/94 World Skiing Championship in Whistler, British Columbia.

As two-time Juno winners and winner of the Best R&B/Reggae Recording at the 1988 CASBY Awards, the Sattalites are one of Canada's longest standing reggae groups.

== Members ==
Fergus Hambleton has been the lead vocalist of the Sattalites since the band's beginning. He also plays the guitar, alto saxophone and the keyboard and has played in other bands including A Passing Fancy and the Ginger Group.

Vocalist Jo Jo Bennett, a founding member of the group, also played the flugelhorn and percussion. The other six members are David Fowler (keyboards), Bruce McGillivray (bass), Neville Francis(rhythm guitar, backup, and lead vocals), Junior McPherson (drums and percussion), Rick Morrison (saxophone) and Bruce 'Preacher' Robinson (piano and vocals). During the 1980s and 1990s, Felix Taylor played trombone and sang background vocals. Neil Chapman was a member for their first three albums, playing lead guitar, and has also guested on later recordings as well live on stage.

Currently, the Sattalites perform in a more "big band" style, appearing at various festivals and theatres in southern Ontario and elsewhere.

== Discography ==
Albums

- 1985 Sattalites
- 1987 Live via Sattalites
- 1989 Miracles
- 1993 All Over the World
- 1995 Now and Forever
- 2003 Reggaefication

Singles

- "Wild"
- “Gimme Some Kinda Sign” (#44 Can Pop / #9 Can AC)
- “Too Late to Turn Back Now” (#17 Can AC / #1 CanCon)
- “Now and Forever”
- “I’m Gonna Be The One”
- “Miracles”
- "The Reason Why"
- “Rendezvous”
- “Walkin On Sunshine”
