= Lydia Taylor =

Canadian rock singer

Lydia Taylor is a Canadian former rock singer, most noted for winning the Juno Award for Most Promising Female Vocalist at the Juno Awards of 1983.

== Biography ==
Originally from Sudbury, Ontario, Taylor moved to Toronto after high school to become a singer. Initially performing with an all-girl pop group called The Starlettes, after a few years she left to join the rock band Trixter.

She released her first single, "Love a Little Harder", in 1976.

Her self-titled debut album was released on Falcon Records in 1979, and Taylor supported the release with a cross-Canada tour. She followed up with Lydia Taylor Band in 1981, breaking through to wider radio airplay and sales. The album produced a single, "Some Guys", which charted on radio stations across Canada. With this second album, her management team at Falcon Records also secured distribution in the USA on Passport Records.

Around the same time as her Juno Award win she released her third and final recording, the five-song EP Bitch. The album was an especially strong seller in Western Canada. The album was also released in the USA on Passport Records, and Taylor and her band toured through the eastern and southern USA in support of the release.

The recording of a follow-up album was underway, produced by Canadian songwriter and producer David Tyson. Before it could be completed, however, Falcon Records declared bankruptcy. Taylor was unable to secure a deal with another label, and left the music industry.

== Discography ==
=== Lydia Taylor (1979) ===
All songs arranged by Richard Zwicewicz. Produced by Robert Leth & Richard Zwicewicz. Engineered by Robert Leth.

- Lydia Taylor – vocals
- Richard Zwicewicz – guitars (all tracks), background vocals (tracks 1, 3, 5–10)
- Gerry Mischuk – organ and keyboards (tracks 2, 3, 5–10)
- Matthew Pines – grand piano (track 4)
- Dan Donovan – bass (tracks 2, 3, 5–9)
- David McManus – bass (tracks 1, 4, 10)
- Kenny Trevenna – drums (tracks 2–10)
- Matt Campbell – drums (track 1), percussion (track 9)
- Steve Kennedy – sax (tracks 2, 3, 6, 8, 9), background vocals (tracks 3, 6, 7, 8, 10)
- Chris Archer – background vocals (tracks 3, 6, 7, 8, 10)
- Kerry Knickle – background vocals (tracks 5, 9)
- Kelly Jay – background vocals (tracks 5, 9)

Side one
| No. | Title | Writer(s) | Length |
|---|---|---|---|
| 1. | "You'll Like It" | Richard Zwicewicz | 3:40 |
| 2. | "Dreamer" | Richard Zwicewicz | 4:02 |
| 3. | "He's a Rebel" | Gene Pitney | 4:31 |
| 4. | "Matthew" | Richard Zwicewicz | 3:42 |
| 5. | "All I Really Wanna Do" | Bob Dylan | 3:03 |

Side two
| No. | Title | Writer(s) | Length |
|---|---|---|---|
| 6. | "I'm A W.O.M.A.N." | Jerry Lieber, Mike Stoller | 3:37 |
| 7. | "Tuff Chick" | Richard Zwicewicz, Lydia Taylor | 3:01 |
| 8. | "Bring It On Home To Me" | Sam Cooke | 3:22 |
| 9. | "Do Wah Diddy" | Jeff Barry, Ellie Greenwich | 2:54 |
| 10. | "Try Again" | Richard Zwicewicz | 4:34 |

=== The Lydia Taylor Band (1981) ===
All songs arranged by Richard Zwicewicz. Produced by Bob Gallo & Don V. Lorusso. Engineered by Mickey Walsh.

- Lydia Taylor – vocals
- Richard Zwicewicz – guitars (all tracks), background vocals (tracks 1–5, 7–10)
- Don Paulton – keyboards (tracks 1–4, 8), background vocals (tracks 1–4, 8, 9)
- Andy Arntfield – keyboards (tracks 5–7, 9, 10), background vocals (tracks 5, 7, 9, 10)
- Bill Scullion – bass (tracks 1–4, 8)
- Dana Westall – bass (tracks 5–7, 9, 10)
- Dave Burton – drums (tracks 1–4, 8), background vocals (tracks 1–4, 8)
- Gibby Lacasse – drums (tracks 5–7, 9, 10)
- Sharon Lee Williams – background vocals (track 6)
- Colina Phillips – background vocals (track 6)
- Shawne Jackson – background vocals (track 6)

Side one
| No. | Title | Writer(s) | Length |
|---|---|---|---|
| 1. | "Some Guys" | Richard Zwicewicz | 2:39 |
| 2. | "All Night" | Richard Zwicewicz | 2:59 |
| 3. | "Always Late" | Richard Zwicewicz | 3:15 |
| 4. | "Drive You Crazy" | Richard Zwicewicz | 4:07 |
| 5. | "Dreamer" | Richard Zwicewicz | 5:06 |

Side two
| No. | Title | Writer(s) | Length |
|---|---|---|---|
| 6. | "Miracles" | Miles Hunter | 4:07 |
| 7. | "On The Side" | Richard Zwicewicz | 3:55 |
| 8. | "Leave Me Alone" | Richard Zwicewicz | 3:38 |
| 9. | "Cut Throat" | Richard Zwicewicz | 3:37 |
| 10. | "Highway To Hell" | Angus Young, Bon Scott, Malcolm Young | 4:04 |

=== Bitch (1983) ===
All songs arranged by Richard Zwicewicz & Don Lorusso. Produced by Don V. Lorusso. Engineered by Fraser Hill.

- Lydia Taylor – vocals
- Richard Zwicewicz – guitars, background vocals
- Andy Arntfield – keyboards, background vocals
- Warren "Wiggy" Toll – bass, background vocals
- Gibby Lacasse – drums

Side one
| No. | Title | Writer(s) | Guest musician(s) | Length |
|---|---|---|---|---|
| 1. | "Bitch" | Richard Zwicewicz | Larry Fast | 5:05 |
| 2. | "Don't Get Mad, Get Even" | Lisa Dal Bello, Tim Thorney | | 3:55 |
| 3. | "You Talk Tough" | Andy Arntfield | | 4:07 |

Side two
| No. | Title | Writer(s) | Guest musician(s) | Length |
|---|---|---|---|---|
| 4. | "Dead Of The Night" | Richard Zwicewicz | Larry Fast | 4:15 |
| 5. | "Modern Lies" | Richard Zwicewicz | | 4:38 |
