= Zon (band) =

Canadian band

- Origin: Toronto, Ontario, Canada
- Genres: Progressive rock
- Years active: 1977–1981
- Labels: Epic, Falcon
- Members: Denton Young, Howard Helm, Brian Miller, Kim Hunt, Jim Samson

Zon was a progressive rock band formed in Toronto, Ontario, Canada in 1977. The band consisted of vocalist Denton Young, guitarist Brian Miller, bassist Jim Samson, drummer Kim Hunt, and keyboard player Howard Helm. The band released three albums.

== History ==
In Toronto, during the mid-1970s, several local musicians formed a group called Act III. One member of Act III was guitarist Rik Emmett who left the group to join Triumph. This led to the break up of Act III. Other members of the group formed Zon. Emmett says that one of the songs he performed with Act III was "The Blinding Light Show", a tune which he later recorded with Triumph.

Don V. Lorusso produced Zon's first album, Astral Projector, released in 1978, and a run of copies were released on blue vinyl. The album garnered the band a Juno Award for Breakthrough Group of the Year nomination. Zon opened concerts for The Tubes at Toronto's Maple Leaf Gardens, and for Styx and Foreigner at CNE Stadium.

Back Down to Earth, released in 1979, was produced by Lorusso and the late Vancouver keyboard player Dale Jacobs. The band played in Toronto as headliners with up to 17,800 attendees.

Zon was dropped from Epic after a thorough corporate housecleaning of the A&R Department despite Zon already having their contract signed for a third album.

After a legal battle they did manage one more album for Falcon Records called I'm Worried About the Boys!, produced by then former CBS/Epic A&R executive Bob Gallo. The record featured a cover version of The Velvet Underground's "Sweet Jane".

As part of the 1980 album tour Zon did an opening slot for Alice Cooper at CNE Stadium. When Cooper failed to appear minutes before showtime, Denton Young was given the onerous task of telling the audience. A riot ensued and police had to be called out. The band broke up shortly after, despite the 1981 single "For You" reaching No. 2 on CKOC (higher than any of the previous singles on Epic Records).

== Post-Zon ==
Young has featured on Rik Emmett's solo work since the disbanding of Zon, whilst Hunt joined the bands Hanover, Urgent, and Moxy. Samson also joined Moxy, and Miller worked at the Toronto guitar store 12th Fret.

Helm joined Michael Fury, a Canadian band that later became Refugee. In 1988, Helm accepted a job as touring keyboardist for Mick Ronson and Ian Hunter, subsequently spending four years touring the world. He co-wrote many of the World Championship Wrestling theme songs with Jimmy Hart. Helm is currently writing for the TBS (TV network) in Atlanta and Universal Studios in Orlando, Florida. He continues to play keyboards as a session musician for bands such as Seven Mary Three.

In 2003, Helm and his former Zon bandmates were contemplating a new studio album to coincide with the re-issues of that band's back catalogue on CD, but nothing ever materialized.

Guitarist Brian Miller died in Toronto on September 28, 2015, at the age of 60 after a bout with cancer.

== Discography ==
=== Studio albums ===
- Astral Projector (1978) (#44 Canada, May 13, 1978)
- Back Down to Earth (1979)
- I'm Worried About the Boys! (1980)

=== Live albums ===
- Live (2017)

=== Singles ===
- "Melody" (1978)
- "On the Road" (1978)
- "Talkin About" (1978)
- "Back Down to Earth" (1979)
- "Sweet Jane" / "Takin' the Easy Way Out" (1980)
- "For You" / "Just the Other Side" (1981) [CAN No. 49]
- "Better Get Up" (1981)
