= Greg Hambleton =

Canadian music executive

Greg Hambleton is a Canadian music industry entrepreneur living in Hamilton, Ontario. Over the years he has been a record producer, recording engineer, songwriter and music label executive with Axe Records.

== Career ==
Hambleton was the recording engineer when in 1968, Canadian music icon Stompin' Tom Connors, then an aspiring country-folk singer/songwriter, recorded at Toronto's Sound Canada studio to make his debut album, Tragedy Trail, and single, Sudbury Saturday Night. Hambleton heard a loud tapping from around Connors' foot; he found a piece of plywood and had Connors stand on it as he recorded. The board became Connors' legendary trademark. He also helped record Connors' second album Tragedy Train.

After working for a number of recording studios, including RCS and Sound Canada, Hambleton started his own record label, AXE Records. Through this label he produced the first album of the band Thundermug.

He was involved with the careers of Rain, a Kitchener pop-rock group featuring Charity Brown which had a Canadian No. 22 hit in 1971 with the Hambleton-written Out Of My Mind; Major Hoople's Boarding House, a pop-rock band that earned Canadian Top 20 in 1975 with I'm Running After You, with Hambleton's production; Gary and Dave, who had a Canadian No. 1 with Could You Ever Love Me Again; Madrigal, The Irish Rovers, Steel River, and The Stampeders.

== Record labels ==
=== Tuesday Records ===
Tuesday Records was owned by Greg Hambleton. He also owned Tuesday Music Productions. An article appeared in the June 27, 1970 issue of Billboard that Hambleton had signed an agreement with Quality Records for the distribution of his emerging label. At that time, Toronto band Steel River had released a single "Ten Pound Note" which was the first in the label's catalogue. Hambleton was due to make a trip to Western Canada to coordinate the promotional arrangement with Quality distributors for the label's roster. He was also meeting with the press and radio people.

A group on the Tuesday label, Antique Fair had a hit with "Fuddle-Duddle" in 1971. Hambleton had produced it. Quality Records' George Struth the assistant to the VP of the label had set up a deal for US distribution on the Bang Records label.
