= That Same Old Obsession =

Single by Gordon Lightfoot

from the album Old Dan's Records
- A-side: "You Are What I Am"
- Released: November 1972
- Genre: Folk
- Length: 3:46
- Label: Reprise
- Songwriter(s): Gordon Lightfoot
- Producer(s): Lenny Waronker

Gordon Lightfoot singles chronology
"Alberta Bound" (1972)	"That Same Old Obsession" (1972)	"Can't Depend on Love" (1973)

That Same Old Obsession is a song by Gordon Lightfoot, released on the 1972 Old Dan's Records album.

== Chart performance ==
Chart (1972–73)	Peak position
Canadian RPM Top Singles	3
Canadian RPM Adult Contemporary Tracks	1
U.S. Billboard Bubbling Under Hot 100	1
