= Jim and Don Haggart =

Canadian country music duo

Jim and Don Haggart were a Canadian country music duo from Nova Scotia, active in the 1970s. They were Juno Award nominees for Country Single of the Year at the Juno Awards of 1974 for their song "He", and for Best Country Group or Duo at the Juno Awards of 1975.

Brothers from Pictou County, Nova Scotia, Jim was born January 5, 1938, and Don was born May 10, 1951. They were each active in music on their own before moving to Toronto, Ontario in 1971 and signing to Arpeggio Records as a duo.

Their debut album, I'm Coming Home, was released in 1972. They had hits on the RPM Country charts with "I'm Coming Home", "Pictou County Jail", and "He". The duo made their first appearance at the Grand Ole Opry in 1973, and released "He" as their first single in the United States in 1974. American country singer George Hamilton IV recorded a cover of "Pictou County Jail" on his album My North Country Home.

They followed up with the album Balladeers in 1975, having further hit singles with "What Used to Be a River", "Follow Your Heart", "Early Morning Prayer", and "A Special Kind of Feeling"

They broke up as a band following Balladeers, with Jim pursuing a solo career in Western Canada while Don returned to Nova Scotia.

In 1999, the duo released a "best of" compilation.

The brothers were inducted into the Nova Scotia Country Music Hall of Fame in August 2006, just a couple of weeks before Jim Haggart's death on September 4. Don Haggart released the solo country gospel album Prayers and Promise in 2010.

Don Haggart died on February 7th, 2026.
