= Dave Nicol (musician) =

Dave Nicol is a former Canadian folk singer-songwriter, most noted as the winner of the Juno Award for Most Promising Folk Singer at the Juno Awards of 1974.

Originally from St. John's, Newfoundland and Labrador, Nicol signed to Columbia Records and released the album Goodbye Mama in 1973. The album's title track was a moderate hit on the Canadian charts that year. In addition to his Juno Award win for Most Promising Folk Singer, he was also nominated for Best Folk Singer, Most Promising Male Vocalist and Best Folk Single for "Goodbye Mama"; his win made him the first musician from Newfoundland ever to win a Juno.

He followed up in 1975 with the album All the Wild Birds; however, the album was less successful than his debut. He left the music business and moved to Kelowna, British Columbia, reemerging in 1993 with the album Night Crossing. In 1997, Nicol and Gordon Pinsent collaborated on the album Harbour of Dreams: A Tribute to Newfoundland.

== Singles ==
Year	Title	Peak positions	
Year	Title	Canada AC	Canada Top 100
1972	"No One Ever Told Me"	34	—
1973	"Goodbye Mama"	14	19
1974	"Tonight"	37	—
1974	"Dancin' Romancin'"	26	—
1974	"Mexico"	43	—
