= Steel River (band) =

Canadian rock band

- Origin: Toronto, Ontario, Canada
- Genres: Rock
- Years active: 1969–1974; 1980
- Labels: Tuesday, Axe
- Past members: John Dudgeon (vocals, Guitar); Bob Forrester (keyboards); Rob Cockell (bass); Tony Dunning (guitar); Ray Angrove (drums); Dennis Watson (drums)

Steel River was a Canadian rock group formed in Toronto, which performed primarily during the 1970s.

== Background ==
Starting in 1965 as a part-time Toronto R&B club band called The Toronto Shotgun, Steel River became a full-time band in 1969. The lineup consisted of singer John Dudgeon, keyboardist Bob Forrester, bassist Rob Cockell, guitarist Tony Dunning, and drummers Ray Angrove and Dennis Watson. Greg Hambleton signed them to his then-label Tuesday Records. Their first single, "Ten Pound Note", was written with the assistance of A Passing Fancy's Jay Telfer. The single hit the Top 10 in Canada. It finished in Canada at #79 for the year.

== Career ==
In December 1970, Steel River and Tuesday Records labelmates Madrigal were ready to tour Quebec and the Maritimes. Also they were to appear in a CKFH promoted charity-related concert that was held at Massey Hall on the 20th. Other artists on the list were Ronnie Hawkins, Everyday People, Madrigal, and Tommy Graham.

In 1971, the band released a follow-up LP on Evolution Records. A single, "Southbound Train", was released through Quality Records and included a toy train in the promotional package.

They continued touring internationally until they disbanded in 1974. Before breaking up, however, they went on a 14-state tour in the United States.

Four out of five of the original members reunited briefly in 1980, and released a single, "Armoured Car".

In 1983, vocalist John Dudgeon went on to release a solo track entitled "Put My Arms Around You", which received extensive airplay on CKFM (99.9) and other stations in Canada and the US.

In 2013 and 2014, two of Steel River's albums, A Better Road and a remixed Weighin' Heavy, were reissued on producer Greg Hambleton's revived Axe Records label.

== Discography ==
=== Singles ===
- 1970 - "Ten Pound Note" / "Momma Pie Blues" (Tuesday) GH-101 [#5 CAN]
- 1971 - "Walk by the River" / "If You Let Her Know" (Tuesday) GH-105
- 1971 - "Southbound Train (Stand Up)" / "A Lie" (Tuesday) GH-110 [#28 CAN]
- 1971 - "Mexican Lady" / "Joyful Judy" (Tuesday) GH-113
- 1974 - "Just Remember" / "Lazin' Children" (Axe) AXE-14
- 1980 - "Armoured Car" / "Hold Me Close" (Axe) AXE-60
- 1980 - "We Want You to Love Us" / "Keep Movin' On" (Axe) AXE-61

=== Albums ===
- 1970 - Weighin' Heavy (Tuesday) GHL-1000
- 1971 - A Better Road (Tuesday) GHL-1003 and (Evolution) 3006 (US)
- 1979 - Armoured Car (Axe Records Limited) AXM-1001
- 2014 - A Better Road [Re-issue] (Axe Records) A534
- 2015 - Weighin' Heavy [Re-issue] (Axe Records) A536
- 2015 - Armoured Car [Re-issue] (Axe Records digital download) DL-A540

=== Compilation tracks ===
- 1990 - "Ten Pound Note" on Made in Canada: Volume One - The Early Years (BMG) KCD1-7156

== External links and sources ==
- Steel River at AllMusic
- Discogs: Steel River
- 45Cat: Steel River
