= Could You Ever Love Me Again =

Single by Gary and Dave
- B-side: "Where Do We Go From Here?" (U.S.) "Star Crossed Lovers" (Australia)
- Released: December 1973
- Genre: Pop
- Label: London
- Songwriters: Dave Beckett, Gary Weeks
- Producer: Greg Hambleton

Gary and Dave singles chronology
"Here it Comes Again" (1973)	"Could You Ever Love Me Again" (1973)	"I Fell in Love With You Sometime" (1974)

"Could You Ever Love Me Again" is a 1973 song recorded by Gary and Dave. It became their greatest hit, reaching #7 in Australia and #1 in Canada. It was also a minor hit in the United States.

The song also charted on the Adult Contemporary charts of the U.S. and Canada.

== Chart history ==
=== Weekly charts ===
Chart (1973–74)	Peak position
Australia (Kent Music Report)	7
Canada RPM Top Singles	1
Canada RPM Adult Contemporary	20
U.S. Billboard Hot 100	92
U.S. Billboard Adult Contemporary	47
U.S. Cash Box Top 100	91

=== Year-end charts ===
Chart (1973)	Rank
Canada	24

Chart (1974)	Rank
Australia (Kent Music Report)	49
U.S. (Joel Whitburn's Pop Annual)	496
