= Thundermug =

Canadian rock band

- Origin: London, Ontario, Canada
- Genres: Rock; hard rock
- Years active: 1970–1976, 1991–2001
- Labels: Axe Records; Raven Records; Big Tree Records; Epic Records; Mercury Records
- Past members: Joe de Angelis; Bill Durst; James Corbett; Ed Pranskus; Corey Thompson; Justin Burgess

Thundermug was a Canadian rock band formed in London, Ontario, in 1970. They were active from 1970 to 1976 and again from 1991 to 2001. They charted three top 50 Canadian singles and released five studio albums.

== History ==
=== 1970–1976 ===
Thundermug was formed in London, Ontario, and existed from 1970 to 1976. They regrouped in 1991 and officially disbanded in 2001. As a result of a signing facilitated by their manager, Wyn Anderson, their principal recordings were released by Axe Records, an independent Canadian label that was distributed by London Records in Canada and various labels in the US and elsewhere. Their music was initially distributed in the United States by the Big Tree and the Epic labels. In 1975, Ta-Daa!! was distributed in the United States by Mercury Records.

The band was initially composed of Joe de Angelis (guitar and vocals), Bill Durst (keyboards and guitar), James Corbett (bass), and Ed Pranskus (drums). Their first album, Thundermug Strikes, recorded at Toronto Sound Studios in the spring of 1972, was produced by Greg Hambleton, owner of Axe Records, and engineered by Terry Brown. The album resulted in a Canadian Top 40 hit, "Africa", based on radio interest in what was originally a non-single album song. The first single from the album had been a version of The Kinks' "You Really Got Me". The album is described by reviewer Richie Unterberger as "...above average, early '70s hard rock... It's a minor entry in the style, but a decent minor entry, moving along with real guts and convincing riffs, but not at the expense of fair melodies, well-done vocal harmonies, and unusual progressions."

In 1973, the band recorded its second album, Orbit, at Toronto's Manta Sound. The title track was a Top 50 Canadian single. The album is described by reviewer Richie Unterberger as "probably the best reflection of their straight-ahead, respectable-but-not-brilliant brand of early-'70s hard rock, muscular but reasonably melodic, with inventive interplay between lead and background vocals, ending with a rather impressive facsimile of Jimi Hendrix's noisiest guitar wiggles."

Selections from the first two albums were released in 1973 in the United States by Epic Records, using the title from the first album, Thundermug Strikes. Review Richie Unterberger regarded the release as "confusing...(but) it did a reasonable job of representing the sound of this Canadian hard rock band, including some of its better-known tracks with 'Africa', 'Orbit', 'Garden Green', 'Jane J James', and a cover of the Kinks' "You Really Got Me."

In 1974, the band returned to Toronto Sound and recorded their third album, Ta-Daa, releasing a cover of The Beatles' "Drive My Car" as the first single. The album was released in the United States on Mercury Records.

Ta-Daa was not as successful as the band's two previous releases. Joe de Angelis quit the band following the release of Ta-Daa, and the band continued through 1975 as a trio. The band released one final single in 1975, "Clap Your Hands and Stomp Your Feet", which was a Top 50 single in Canada. The band did not formally break up, but became inactive, as of 1976. Band members then commenced various solo projects. Bill Durst joined a ZZ Top tribute band called Tres Hombres, and later was a member of The Brains, a band that released one album in 1980, on Falcon Records. Joe de Angelis became involved in production work, acting as assistant engineer on Meat Loaf's 1981 album, Dead Ringer. In 1983, Durst released a solo album, Call Billy, on Passport Records. Joe de Angelis contributed background vocals. In 1989, Durst released a cassette-only second solo album, Father Earth, on the independent Cottage Records.

=== 1991–2001 ===
At the initiative of former manager Wyn Anderson, the band gave various reunion performances in the 1980s. The band formally reunited in 1991, with original members Durst and Corbett, plus new drummer Cory Thompson.

The band's later releases were on Raven Records, a label owned by Wyn Anderson and run from a farmhouse outside London, Ontario. Anderson had personally financed the band's return to recording, resulting in the 1995 release of Who's Running My World and the 1997 release of Bang The Love Drum. Who's Running My World? had 42 weeks of continuous airplay in Canada and resulted in three charting singles. Thompson was replaced on drums by Justin Burgess for the recording of Bang The Love Drum, though original drummer Ed Pranskus returned for subsequent live performances. With the death of Anderson in 1999, the band's recording career ended.

Corbett left the band in 2000, for health reasons. Burgess rejoined the band, to replace Corbett on bass. During the 2000–2001 period, the band had a succession of drummers. The Thundermug name was formally retired in 2000; the band continued as Big On Venus, a group with Durst and Pranskus, plus Justin Burgess and his then-wife Sarah Burgess. The band formally disbanded in 2001.

=== Post breakup ===
In 2006, Thundermug was inducted into the London Music Hall of Fame.

Following the breakup of the band, Bill Durst developed a solo career as an award-winning blues artist. In 2009, Durst released The Great Willy Mammoth, which featured a number of reunion performances with former bandmate Joe de Angelis. Ed Pranskus continued his drumming career as Izzy Bartok. Justin Burgess developed a solo career as multi-instrumentalist "Just B".

== Discography ==
- Thundermug Strikes (1972), Axe Records
- Orbit (1973), Axe Records
- Thundermug Strikes (1973), Epic Records (U.S release with different track listing)
- 1974 Ta-Daa, Axe Records - single "I Feel Lonely" / "Banga Banga" Axe 1975
- 1975 Ta-Daa, Mercury Records (U.S. release different Track Listing)
- 1995 Who's Running My World, Raven Records
- 1997 Bang The Love Drum, Raven Records
- 2013 Thundermug Strikes, Axe Records Re-issue
- 2015 Thundermug Orbit, Axe Records Re-issue
- 2015 Thundermug Ta-Daa!!, Axe Records Re-issue
