= Major Hoople's Boarding House =

- Origin: Cambridge, Ontario, Canada
- Genre: pop
- Years active: 1967–present
- Labels: Major Records; Axe Records; Polydor Records; MUCH Records; Chelsea Records
- Members: Rocky Howell; Peter Padalino; Rena Gaile; Ron Duke; Ralph Hetke
- Past members: David Lodge; Rick Riddell; Peter Beacock; Keith Stahlbaum; Brad Stahlbaum; Ed Miller; Dave Gooding; David Gregg; Keith Stahlbaum; John Rankin; Brian Tozer; Gail Selkirk; Grant Heywood; Jack Kalenderian; James Leroy

Major Hoople's Boarding House is a Canadian pop band from Galt, Ontario (now Cambridge, Ontario). They have released two albums and several singles, three of which appeared on national charts.

== History ==
In 1967, Rocky Howell (vocals), Peter Padalino (guitar), Gail Selkirk (vocals, keyboards), David Lodge (bass, saxophone, vocals), and drummer Rick Riddell formed a band in Galt called the Shan-De-Leers. They then moved to Kitchener, Ontario which, at the time, was a hub of new musical talent. There, they were taken up by what Padalino called "The Mike Bergauer Machine": Bergauer was a local musician, teacher and arranger who mentored numerous bands. The band was renamed Major Hoople's Boarding House; the name referred to the long-running Gene Ahern comic strip, Our Boarding House (Ahern gave his permission for its use). They were then signed to the booking agency Grand Productions. They began playing university dates and festivals, and released eight singles, including two for Montreal's MUCH Records and six for Polydor Records. In 1972, Riddell and Selkirk left the band and were replaced by Ed Miller and Peter Beacock.

In 1975, the band was signed by Axe Records. Lodge left the band to concentrate on songwriting and management; he was replaced by Keith Stahlbaum and, on saxophone, Dave Gooding. Also in 1975, they had a Canadian radio hit with "I'm Running After You", which peaked at No. 16. Their 1976 singles "You Girl" and "Got You on my Mind" also did well on radio; singer James Leroy joined the band that year.

The band spent a number of years performing on the Ontario club circuit and at summer dance halls. In 1980, they released the single "Our House", which appeared on the RPM 100 chart in October and November. By now, they had added David Gregg on trombone; their 1980 single "Someone" performed well.

In 1981, they released The Hooples Album and went on a cross-Canada tour. In 1982, they performed the Electrohome 75th Anniversary Concert with the Kitchener-Waterloo Symphony at the University of Waterloo.

They continued performing in the 1980s with a varying lineup, and then went on hiatus as some of the members joined other bands; Padalino and Beacock joined the country band Desert Dolphins.

Lodge had been working as a songwriter for Peermusic (and was the writer of the international Peter Schilling hit "Major Tom"). Lodge returned to the band in 1982 and the band reformed with Jack Kalenderian on keyboards who replaced Peter Beacock. Kalenderian and Lodge wrote the song Wait for my Love (1983) (Recorded and released by Toronto Based band Headlines) which made the MOR charts playing over 180 radio stations in Canada. The Band then recorded a second album in 1985 "The New Adventures of Hooples", which yielded a top-10 single "Late Night Invitation", written by Lodge and drummer Grant Heywood, who had joined the band in 1981. This was also made into a music video produced by Kalenderian. The lineup at that time included Heywood, Lodge, Howell and Kalenderian. Lodge then passed away and the band toured with the new lineup of Grant Heywood (band leader/drums), Rocky Howell (guitar), Ralph Hetke (keyboards), and Gary Hintz (bass). They continued to tour into the early 1990s.

In 2008, Beacock and Stahlbaum formed a new band, The Fossilz, with guitarist Brian Tozer, drummer John Rankin, and drummer/vocalist Ron Duke. When Gooding and Miller returned in 2010, they reverted to their original name and were joined by Brad Stahlbaum (keyboards) and Rena Gaile; Peter Padalino returned. In 2012, the band released the single "Sunnyside"; they also released the James Leroy song "Sailor".

== Discography ==
=== Albums ===
- The Hooples Album, 1981, Axe Records (re-issued 2013)
- The New Adventures of Hooples, 1985, Major Records

=== Singles ===
- "Beautiful Morning", (B: "Love Back"), 1970, Polydor
- "Lady", (B: "Your Kite, My Kite"), 1970, Much
- "Lady Song", (B: "She's Got All Of My Body"), 1971, Polydor
- "Everything's the Same", (B: "I Believe in You"), 1972, Polydor
- "Face on the Wind", 1973, Chelsea Records
- "I'm Running After You", (B: "Questions in Mind"), 1975, Axe Records
- "You Girl", (B: "Barnstormer"), 1976, Axe Records
- "I've Got You On My Mind", (B: "Magic Of A Feeling"), 1976, Axe Records
- "Someone", 1980, (B: "Loving You"), Axe Records
- "Our House", 1980, Axe Records
- "This Song Reminds Me of You", (B: "I'm Easy"), 1981, Axe Records
- "You're Hurtin' Everyone", (B: "Good Morning Sun"), 1983, Axe Records
- "Late-Night Invitation", (B: "Meet Me Later"), 1985, Major Records
- "You're Right", (B: "Love on the Run"), 1985, Major Records
- "Sailor", 2012
- "Sunnyside", 2012
