= Alabama (Canadian band) =

Canadian band of the early 1970s

Alabama was a Canadian band of the early 1970s. The band members were Buster Fykes, Hector McLean, Rick Knight, and Len Sembaluk. The band performed a mix of progressive rock, cajun, country, and soul music, including songs written by Fykes and Knight.

== History ==
In 1973, Alabama released their only album, Close to Home, on Smile Records. In addition to the band members, the album was recorded with Al Cherney on fiddle, and Hagood Hardy on vibraphone. The first released single, "Song of Love", appeared on the top 100 in the RPM magazine chart, peaking at No. 26 in June that year. A second single, "Highway Driving", was written by Fykes and Knight and was released through Maple Creek Music; it reached No. 42 in August 1973. At the Juno Awards of 1974, "Highway Driving" was nominated for Canadian Country Single of the year in 1974; Alabama also received a nomination as Best Country Group. Alabama disbanded in 1974.

== Discography ==
=== Albums ===
Year	Album
1973	Close to Home

=== Singles ===
Year	Single	Chart Positions			Album
Year	Single	CAN AC	CAN	CAN Country	Album
1973	"Song of Love"	1	26	—	Close to Home
1973	"Highway Driving"	29	42	19	Close to Home
