= Valdy =

Canadian musician (b. 1945)

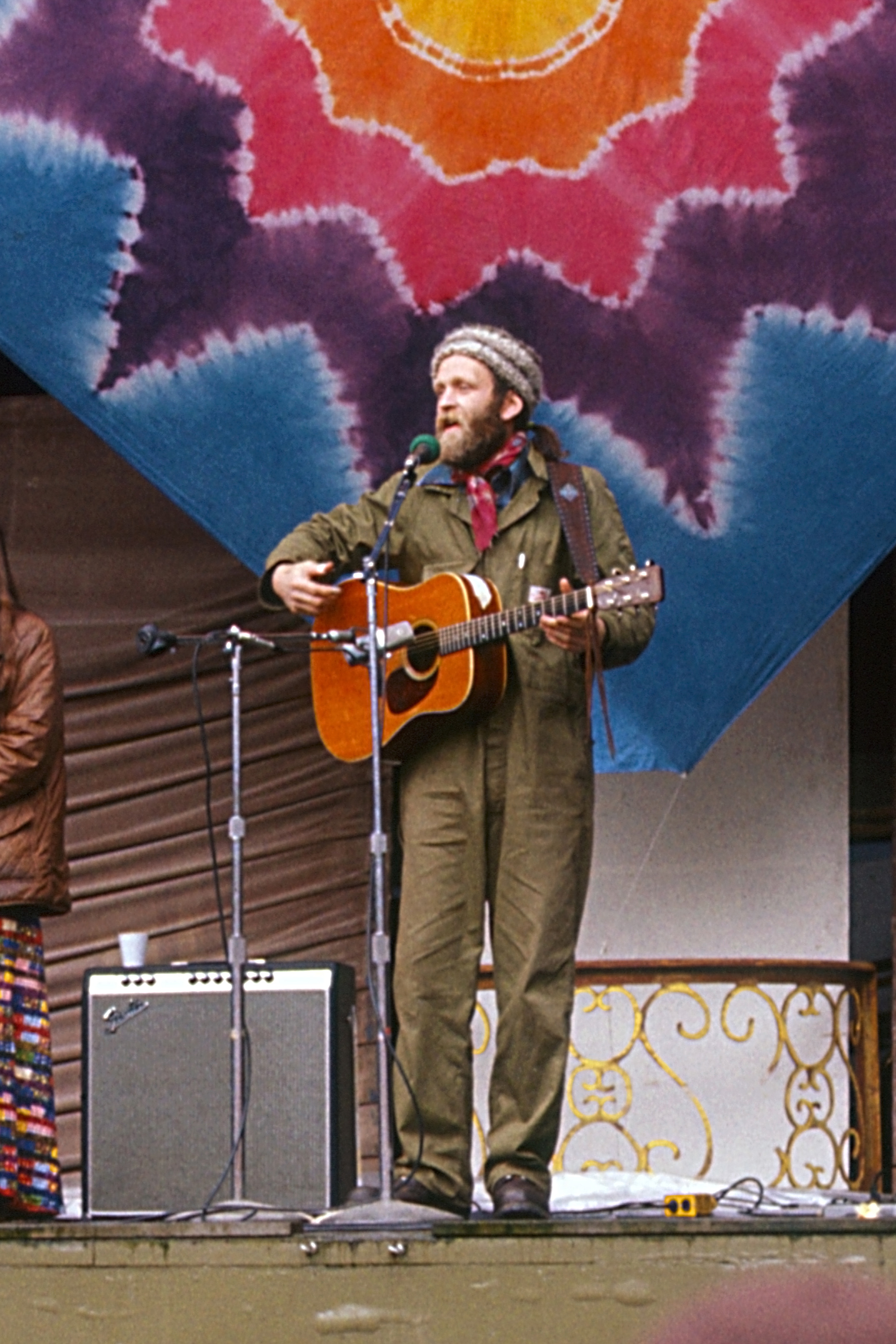
- Valdy in 1976

Background information
- Born: Paul Valdemar Horsdal; 1 September 1945 (age 81); Ottawa, Ontario, Canada
- Genres: Folk, country
- Occupations: Singer-songwriter, musician
- Instruments: Vocals, guitar
- Years active: 1960s–present
- Spouse: Kathleen Fraser (m. 1986)

Paul Valdemar Horsdal, CM (born 1 September 1945), commonly known as Valdy, is a Canadian folk and country musician whose solo career began in the early 1970s. He is known for "Rock and Roll Song", his first mainstream single. Valdy is the winner of two Juno Awards for Folk Singer of the Year and Folk Entertainer of the Year and has received seven additional Juno nominations. His fourteen albums, including four which are certified gold, have achieved sales of nearly half a million copies.

== Early life and education ==
Valdy was born and grew up in Ottawa, Ontario, the third child of Danish portrait photographer Paul Horsdal and Lillian Horsdal (née West), an English nurse and writer. He studied guitar and piano, and attended Lisgar Collegiate Institute.

== Career ==
=== Early career ===
Valdy was a member of The London Towne Criers during the 1960s and subsequently joined Montreal band The Prodigal Sons. He then moved to Victoria, where he worked with various rock and country musicians, including Blake Emmons.

When he was 25 Valdy bought several acres of land in Sooke, BC, and began farming. He began performing as a solo artist, and in 1972 recorded his "Rock and Roll Song" on Haida/A&M; it became a hit. His music was featured in the 1972 Steve McQueen film The Getaway. In 1973 he won a Juno Award for Outstanding Folk Performance.

Valdy recorded a live album, Family Gathering, through A&M; it was recorded at Massey Hall in Toronto and released in 1974.

Valdy appeared on the CBC TV show The Beachcombers as the environmental activist "Halibut" Stu. He also secured a part in the reunion production of The New Beachcombers performing a song he wrote, "It's The Water," as part of a jug band.

Valdy was among the performers at the first Home County Folk Festival in London, Ontario Canada, in 1974.

=== 1980s ===
Played at the 1983 Home County Folk festival in London Ontario, on July 23rd.

Also during the 1980s, Valdy was part of the Duke Street Records roster that included violinist Hugh Marsh, singer/songwriter Brian Plummer, and pianist Hagood Hardy.

In 1986, Valdy made a guest appearance as himself in the popular 1980's Canadian children's television show, Today's Special (episode entitled: "trash"). He also guest appeared as himself on Sharon, Lois & Bram's Elephant Show in the third-season episode titled "Growing Up".

=== 2000s ===
In 2000, Valdy released the album Contenders with country musician Gary Fjellgaard. He continued to tour with Fjellgaard for many years.

Valdy recorded 2003's Viva Valdy: Live at Last during the Rack-On-Tour. On 21 November 2005, Valdy was awarded the National Achievement Award by SOCAN at the 2005 SOCAN Awards in Toronto.

=== 2010s ===
Valdy was appointed a member of the Order of Canada in June 2011. In 2012, he released his 18th album, Read Between the Lines, and toured across Canada in support.

In 2013, Valdy toured in Canada with New Zealand guitarist Graham Wardrop. In 2014, he continued to perform at folk festivals, including Kingsville Folk with jazz pianist Karel Roessingh and Nadina Mackie-Jackson on bassoon.

As of 2018, Valdy continues to regularly tour across Canada, including a performance on the main stage at the Mariposa Folk Festival.

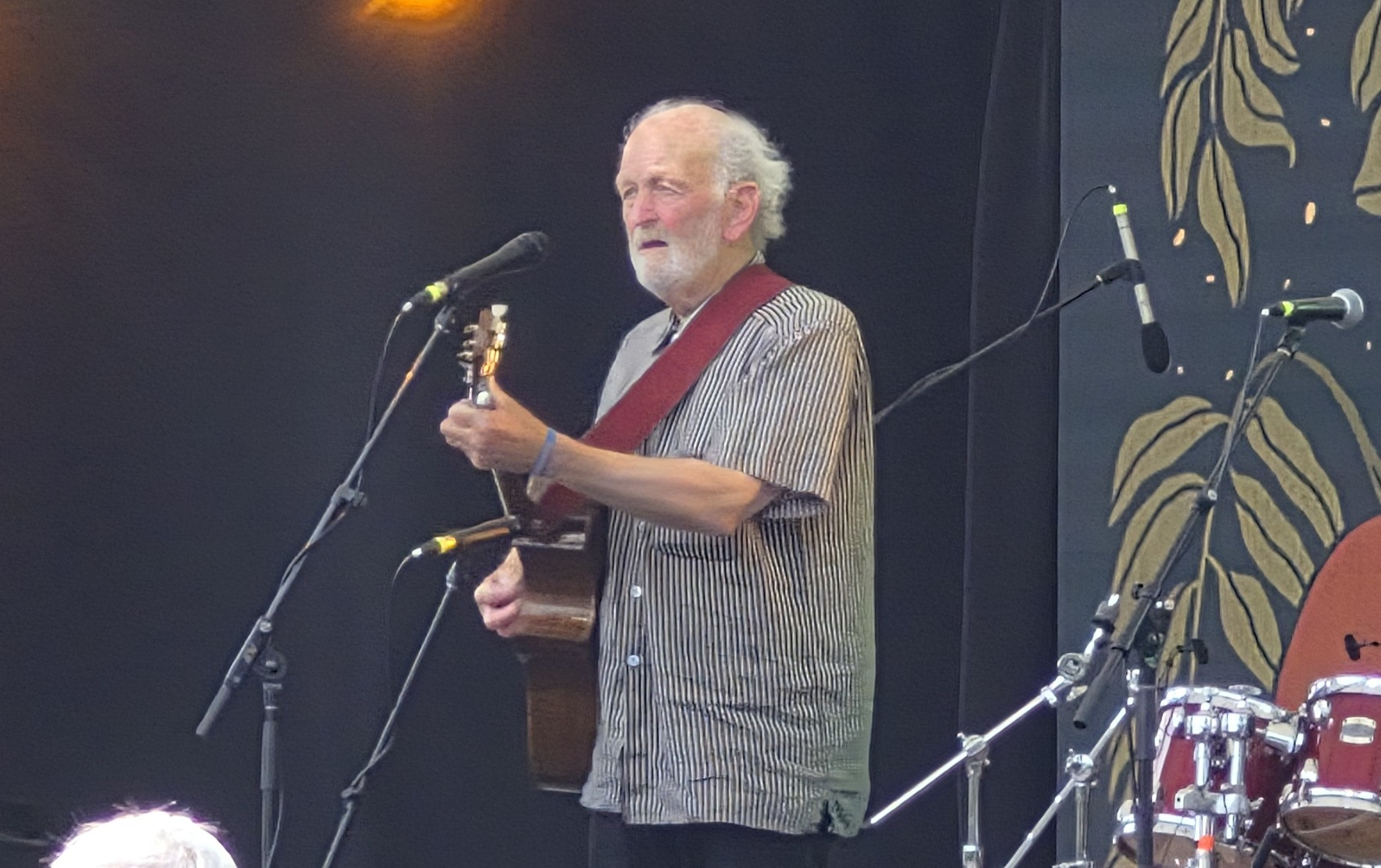
Valdy on mainstage of Home County Music and Arts Festival, London, Ontario, July 25, 2026.

2020s

Valdy returned to the Home County Folk Festival on its 50th anniversary in London, Ontario on July 26th 2026.

== Personal life ==
In 1986, Valdy married Kathleen Fraser Horsdal. Kathleen is a teacher, hospice worker and song co-writer. His daughter with his then partner Lindsay Whalen is actress Chelah Horsdal (b. 1973).

== Discography ==
=== Albums ===
| Year | Album | CAN |
|---|---|---|
| 1972 | Country Man | 39 |
| 1973 | Landscapes | 39 |
| 1974 | Family Gathering | 35 |
| 1975 | See How the Years Have Gone By | — |
| 1976 | Valdy and the Hometown Band | 40 |
| 1978 | Hot Rocks | 65 |
| 1980 | 1001 | — |
| 1980 | Passport: Best of Valdy | — |
| 1981 | Valdy's Kids Record | — |
| 1986 | Notes from Places | — |
| 1988 | Classic Collection | — |
| 1993 | Heart at Work | — |
| 1996 | Smorgasbard | — |
| 1999 | Contenders (with Gary Fjellgaard) | — |
| 2001 | Valdy: Millennium Collection | — |
| 2003 | Viva Valdy: Live at Last | — |
| 2007 | Contenders Two: Still in the Running (with Gary Fjellgaard) | — |
| 2012 | Read Between The Lines | — |

=== Singles ===
| Year | Single | Chart Positions | | | Album |
| Year | Single | CAN AC | CAN | CAN Country | Album |
|---|---|---|---|---|---|
| 1972 | "Rock and Roll Song" | 31 | 17 | — | Country Man |
| 1973 | "A Good Song" | 9 | 9 | — | Country Man |
| 1973 | "Simple Life" | 22 | 16 | — | Landscapes |
| 1974 | "Landscapes" | 87 | — | — | Landscapes |
| 1974 | "Renaissance" | — | 23 | — | Family Gathering |
| 1976 | "Yes I Can" | 12 | 63 | — | Valdy and the Hometown Band |
| 1976 | "Peter and Lou" | 15 | 58 | — | Valdy and the Hometown Band |
| 1978 | "Dirty Old Man" | 38 | — | — | singles only |
| 1981 | "Easy Money" | 17 | — | — | singles only |
| 1981 | "Thank God He's a Stranger" | 28 | — | — | singles only |
| 1985 | "Sonny's Dream" | — | — | 17 | Notes from Places |
| 1993 | "Link in a Chain" | — | — | 36 | Heart at Work |
| 1994 | "Dreams About You" | — | — | 48 | Heart at Work |
