= Home County Music & Art Festival =

Folk music and crafts festival in London, Ontario

- Genre: Music
- Frequency: Annual
- Locations: Victoria Park, London, Ontario
- Coordinates: 42.9890°N 81.2480°W
- Years active: 1974-present
- Founders: Home County Folk League
- Attendance: 55,000
- Website: homecounty.ca

The Home County Music & Art Festival (formerly Home County Folk Festival) is a festival held the third weekend of July in London, Ontario.

The founders chose the name "H.O.M.E County" because it was an acronym of the nearby counties of Huron, Oxford, Middlesex, and Elgin.

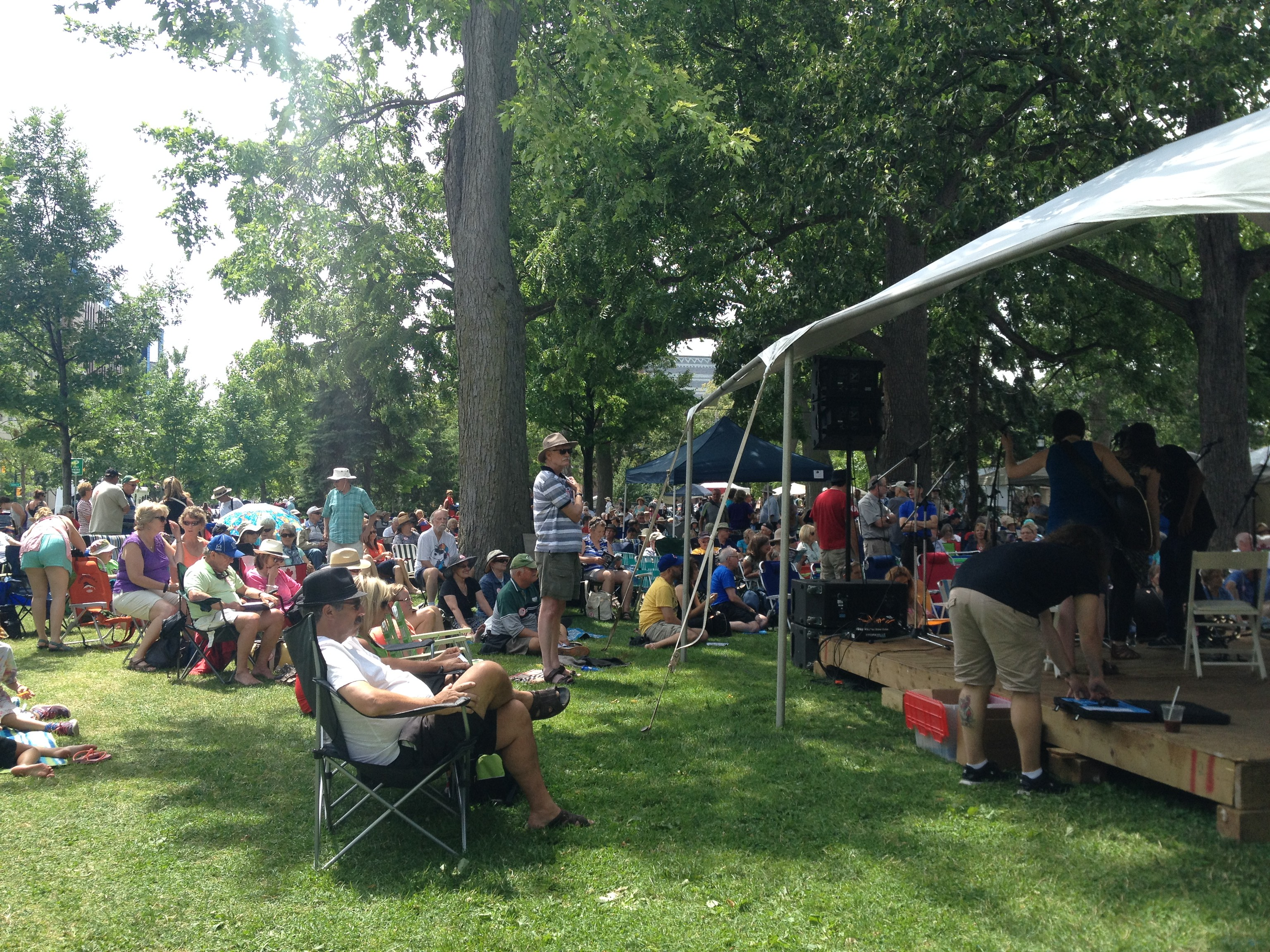
Home County Music & Art Festival

The festival is an admission by donation and is held in Victoria Park, London, Ontario. It is hosted by the Home County Folk League, a non-profit organization formed in 1973, and they have held a festival every year since 1974. In 2023, it was announced that the 2024 festival was canceled.
