= Cathy Young (vocalist) =

Canadian singer and songwriter (born 1951)

- Born: 1951 (age 74–75); Toronto, Ontario
- Occupations: singer, songwriter, producer,

Cathy Young (born 1951) is a Canadian singer and songwriter, producer, and actor. Her first album, A Spoonful of Cathy Young, was released in 1969. It was a Billboard magazine ‘ Pick of the Week’. Her second album, Travel Stained, was released in 1973. Young won the Juno Award for Best New Artist in 1974, and was nominated for the Juno Award in the category of Best Female Vocalist in 1975. In November 2017, Young's image was included on a 220 ft. mural of Canadian music Icons who have performed at historic Yonge Street music venues. The 22-storey mural currently is the second tallest in the world, and was created by noted Toronto artist Adrian Hayles. Cathy Young is known as a trailblazer in Canadian women’s music and is a Yorkville icon. Young has performed worldwide and has a varied career, including voice-directing award-winning video games and mentoring new talent.

== Early life and education ==
Young was born in Toronto, Ontario in 1951. She began singing at the age of three and became a busker as a teenager. When she was sixteen, she sang at The Mynah Bird in Yorkville, Toronto.

== Career ==
After performing at a Queen's Park love-in, in May 1967 and performances at The Rock Pile, Young was signed by Shel Safran, manager of the Detroit band, The Amboy Dukes. Young released her debut album A Spoonful Of Cathy Young in April 1969 on Mainstream Records. Her first album was named 'Pick of the Week ' by Billboard magazine in May 1969. In 1973, Young released her second album Travel Stained on GRT Records.

Young has traveled the world, performing in USA, Mexico, Hong Kong, Cyprus, Thailand, Australia, Caribbean, Hawaii to name a few. Young has portrayed Mary Magdalene in Robert Stigwood's musical Jesus Christ Superstar and voice acted for multiple video games including part of The Black Mirror series. She also has voice directed the English version of the award winning video game Drakensang, River of Time. Young was also a founding member of the Spirit of Yorkville Alumni, and produced the Spirit of Yorkville Music Festival in Toronto.

== Discography ==
- A Spoonful of Cathy Young (1969)
- Travel Stained (1973)
- Young, Live & Rare (2016)

== Awards and honours ==
In 1974, Young won the Juno Award for Most Promising Female Vocalist of the Year. The following year, she was nominated for the Juno Award for Best Female Artist. In 2011, Young was featured in the documentary Yonge Street - Toronto Rock & Roll Stories. Young was honoured in multiple tribute concerts held during the period of October 2012 to June 2013.

Young was honoured to receive a Citation from the Red Cross Society for her performance of the theme song ‘Free The Children’ for the Year Of The Child.

In November 2017, Young's image was included in the 22 storey mural at 423 Yonge Street, depicting music icons who have performed in historic Yonge Street venues. The mural was created by noted Toronto artist Adrian Hayles. Young's first recording on Mainstream Records USA, inducted to the Friar's Music Museum in Toronto located at Sankofa Square. Young was featured in the book, Music from Far and Wide: Celebrating 40 Years of the Juno Awards (Key Porter Books) and Bill King's book ‘ Talk ' Conversations in all Keys.
