= Falcon Records (Canadian label) =

Canadian record label in operation from 1979 to 1985

Falcon Records was a Canadian record label formed in 1979, which ceased operations in 1985. It is notable for having released albums by Zon, Lydia Taylor and The Brains.

== History ==
Falcon Records was formed in 1979, based in Mississauga, Ontario. The label is particularly notable for having released the third album by Zon, I'm Worried About The Boys, in 1980, following the band's legal battle with CBS Records, where the band's first two albums had been released on the related Epic Records label. Another release was the 1980 album by The Brains, Audio Extremo. The Brains were a new wave band that included Thundermug member Bill Durst. The album was produced by Robert Leth, who had been best known as the engineer on late 1970s recordings by singer-songwriter Stan Rogers. The label also released the debut album by Canadian singer Lydia Taylor, who later won the 1983 Juno Award for Most Promising Female Vocalist of the Year.
