= You Are What I Am =

Single by Gordon Lightfoot

from the album Old Dan's Records
- B-side: "That Same Old Obsession"
- Released: November 1972
- Genre: Folk
- Length: 2:37
- Label: Reprise
- Songwriter: Gordon Lightfoot
- Producer: Lenny Waronker

Gordon Lightfoot singles chronology
"Alberta Bound" (1972)	"You Are What I Am" (1972)	"Can't Depend on Love" (1973)

"You Are What I Am" is a song by Gordon Lightfoot, released on the 1972 Old Dan's Records album.

== Chart performance ==
Chart (1972)	Peak position
Canada Top Singles (RPM)	3
Canada Adult Contemporary (RPM)	1
Canada Country Singles (RPM)	1
U.S. Billboard Bubbling Under Hot 100	2
US Adult Contemporary (Billboard)	32
