= A Passing Fancy =

Canadian rock band (1966–1969)

- Origin: Toronto, Ontario, Canada
- Genre: Psychedelic rock
- Years active: 1966–1969
- Spinoff of: The Dimensions
- Past members: Jay Telfer; Brian Price; Rick Mann; Phil Seon; Louis Pratile; Greg Hershoff; Steve Wilson; Ian Telfer

A Passing Fancy was a Canadian band from Toronto, Ontario, active from the mid-1960s fronted by the singer-songwriter and guitarist Jay Telfer and Brian Price.

== Early years ==
At Downsview Secondary School, Brian Price (organ, vocals) formed his own band, the Dimensions with brothers Jay (rhythm guitar) and Ian Telfer (bass guitar), Phil Seon (guitar), and Greg Hershoff (drums) in July 1965. The Dimensions were managed by Bernie Finkelstein, (future president of True North Records and Bruce Cockburn's longstanding manager), who had also been a student at Downsview. After playing dates at many high schools across Ontario, the Dimensions became the house band at Cafe El Patio in the Yorkville Village through Finkelstein's connections. The band changed their name to A Passing Fancy in January 1966 when Finkelstein left to take over the management of The Paupers.

By this stage, Rick Mann (aka Fruchtman) had replaced Jay's brother on bass. The new line-up began to gig extensively on the local scene. Through the band's fan club president, Barb Young, A Passing Fancy was introduced to record store owner Walter Honsberger and partner Dan Bartollini, who began to shape the band's sound and image as Wal-Dan Management. Within a few months, the management team had wrangled a three-single deal with Columbia Records. The first single under this deal, "I'm Losin' Tonight" was very successful and charted across Canada.

In September 1966, Steve Wilson came in to replace Greg Hershoff on the drums. Aside from playing regularly at clubs like the Night Owl, the Gogue Inn and Club 888, A Passing Fancy also worked extensively at the Blue Fox and established a local following throughout late 1966 and early 1967.

== Singles success and playing Expo ==
The band's debut single, Telfer's "I'm Losing Tonight", released in February 1967, reached No. 22 on the CHUM chart the following month. While its follow up, "You're Going Out Of Your Mind" only made No. 37 in June, the group's third single for Columbia, "I Believe in Sunshine" restored some faith by reaching No. 28 in September. By then, Steve Wilson had left and Louis Pratile joined on drums.

During the summer of 1967, A Passing Fancy played at Expo '67 in Montreal where they jammed with local band, Les Tetes Blanches. The moderate success of the singles, prompted Columbia to finance a fourth single, "People In Me", was listed at No. 48 and failed to chart higher when it was released in December.

Telfer's insistence on practice was resisted by Price who was completing his third year in university and wanted to pursue a career in dentistry. In March 1968, Price quit. Although Telfer was recognized as the musical leader of the group, Price was the founder and spiritual and business leader. His leaving the band had a major impact on Seon and Mann. A Passing Fancy carried on by replacing Price with Fergus Hambleton on organ and vocals and Brian Smith who contributed a third folky guitar but the chemistry of the band was never the same.

After shooting at the CBC, playing the first Let's Go television show in colour and performing that same night at the Granite club, Telfer was told by the Wal-Dan management that he would no longer be in the group. Unhappy over the new direction Seon and Mann left shortly thereafter. A few months later, in June 1968, the remaining members of the band also left.

== Fergus Hambleton period ==
The Wal-Dan management decided to reform the band around Hambleton and in July 1968 brought in new members, Ron Forster (guitar), Dan Troutman (bass), Wally Cameron (drums), and Glenn Brown (lead vocals).

The new line up recorded four tracks, which the management took to John Irvine of Boo Records. Irvine helped piece together an album's worth of material and released a lone single, "Your Trip", but it sold poorly.

The self-titled album, which featured all of the Columbia singles, (including an alternate mix of "I'm Losing Tonight" with no lead guitar) was released in November 1968. Like the single, the album failed to make an impression despite the band holding down a residency at the El Patio throughout the latter part of 1968 and early 1969. By June 1969, the band had broken up.

== Aftermath ==
Original member and guiding light, Jay Telfer went on to perform and record as a solo artist. In the spring of 1969, he recorded an unreleased album for Bernie Finkelstein with contributions from Kensington Market members Keith McKie, John Mills Cockell, and Alex Darou; Malcolm Tomlinson and Louis McKelvey from Milkwood; Murray McLauchlan and Kevin Staples, who later found fame with Rough Trade. Telfer died in May 2009.

Staples also played guitar on an album that Telfer and Fergus Hambleton recorded together for Allied Records called "Come Together" as Goody Two Shoes. Telfer resumed a solo career and recorded a string of singles and a 1974 album, Time Has Tied Me for Axe Records in 1973–1974. On that album, Jay brought back Murray McLauchlan, Malcolm Tomlinson, Fred Mollin, Rick Mann, Fergus Hambleton, and Kevin Staples. In 1975, Jay Telfer moved to Los Angeles to marry and quickly divorce Bonnie Bedelia and later became a script writer for Cannon Films, which included 1977's Kid Vengeance, starring Jim Brown, Lee Van Cleef, and Leif Garrett. In Toronto in 1979, Telfer wrote You've Come a Long Way, Katie a three-hour piece on cross-addiction for CBC.

Brian Price graduated dentistry in 1972 and practiced for eight years before he founded Tridont Dental Centres in 1980. Tridont opened 107 dental offices under from coast to coast in Canada. Price challenged dentists' right to advertise their services to the public in 1988. He won a unanimous Supreme Court of Canada decision in 1990 wherein all professionals in Canada can now advertise their services. In 1990, Price left the health care industry and created Parkhurst Products Inc. a hockey card manufacturer. Currently, he owns in the Game, Inc. a sports card and memorabilia manufacturing company based in Vaughan, Ontario.

Hambleton also went solo and later played with the bands Rain and The Basics and with reggae act The Sattalites. Final A Passing Fancy drummer, Wally Cameron was briefly involved with Leigh Ashford as well as lead singer Glenn Brown who also was involved with Leigh Ashford.

Rick Mann changed his name back to Richard Fruchtman and played bass with Whiskey Howl, a seminal Canadian blues band, from 1970 to 1972. He then freelanced and played with Dan Aykroyd, Gilda Radner, Paul Shaffer, Doug Henning, The Diamonds, Doug Kershaw, Dan Hill, Richard Newell (aka King Biscuit Boy), Tony Kosinec, and String Band.

A Passing Fancy reunited for a one-off concert date in Toronto's Yorkville village in 1988.

Later Telfer became publisher and editor of the antique collector's magazine Wayback Times.

James Telfer died May 20, 2009, aged 61.

== Discography ==
=== Singles ===
- "I'm Losing Tonight" c/w "A Passing Fancy" (Columbia 2729) 1967 CAN No. 52
- "You're Going Out of My Mind" c/w "Sounds Silly" (Columbia 2755) 1967
- "I Believe In Sunshine" c/w "She Phoned" (Columbia 2767) 1967 CAN No. 50
- "People In Me" c/w "Spread Out" (Columbia 2772) 1967 CAN No. 89
- "Island" c/w "Your Trip" (Boo 684) 1968 CAN No. 92

=== Albums ===
- A Passing Fancy (Boo 6801) 1968
