= James Leroy =

Background information
- Born: April 3, 1947; Ottawa, Ontario
- Died: 10 May 1979 (aged 32) Ottawa
- Occupations: Singer; songwriter; performer

James Leroy (April 3, 1947 – May 10, 1979) was a Canadian singer, songwriter, recording artist and performer.

== Early life ==
James Leroy was born in Ottawa, Ontario and spent his childhood and adolescence in Martintown, Ontario before returning to Ottawa.

== Career ==
Leroy's music career commenced as a folk singer and songwriter for local bands. Local impresario Harvey Glatt agreed to produce and manage Leroy. Glatt produced Leroy's first single, "Touch of Magic", which reached Number 6 on the Canadian Top Singles Chart, published by RPM Magazine. In 2002, the song received the Classic Award from the Society of Composers, Authors and Music Publishers of Canada, for achieving more than 100,000 plays on Canadian radio.

Glatt also arranged for Adam Mitchell to produce the subsequent album, James Leroy and Denim, released by GRT Records in 1973. Denim, Leroy's supporting group, included Gary Comeau, one of the founding members of The Esquires, a nationally recognized Canadian band, and Val Tuck of Canada Goose. Two further singles from the album, "You Look Good in Denim" and "Make It All Worthwhile" were top 20 Canadian singles.

Leroy dissolved Denim in 1974 and attempted to develop a solo career. Two singles were produced by Ian Thomas, but were not successful. An anticipated solo album did not materialize. In 1976, he joined Major Hoople's Boarding House from Kitchener, Ontario and later the name was changed to Boarding House. They toured the Maritimes.

In late 1978, Leroy and new manager, Martin Onrot, began assembling a band, composed on several ex-Denim players and some new musicians. This band undertook a cross-Canada tour. He also had plans to crack the U.S. market at this time.

== Death ==
Leroy committed suicide in an Ottawa hotel room on May 10, 1979, at the age of 32.
