= Old Dan's Records =

Studio album by Gordon Lightfoot
- Released: November 1972
- Recorded: 1972
- Genre: Folk
- Length: 33:31
- Label: Reprise
- Producer: Lenny Waronker

Gordon Lightfoot chronology
Don Quixote (1972)	Old Dan's Records (1972)	Sundown (1974)

Singles from Old Dan's Records
- 1. "You Are What I Am/That Same Old Obsession" Released: November 1972; 2. "Can't Depend on Love/It's Worth Believin'" Released: January 1973

Professional ratings
Review scores
Source	Rating
Allmusic	3/5 stars

Old Dan's Records is Canadian singer Gordon Lightfoot's eighth studio album, released in 1972 on the Reprise Records label. The album reached #1 in Canada on the RPM national album chart on November 25, 1972, and remained there for three weeks. In the U.S., it peaked at #95 on the pop chart.

The album marks a continued evolution in Lightfoot's sound as he begins to add country influences to his standard folk sound with the help of the banjo, dobro and steel guitar. Lightfoot would continue to use these country influences in his music until the early 1980s.

Despite its 1972 year of initial release, the album was nominated for and won the 1974 Juno Award for "Folk Album of the Year". Lightfoot also won a Juno that year as "Folk Singer of the Year".

== Track listing ==
All compositions by Gordon Lightfoot

=== Side 1 ===
1. "Farewell to Annabel" – 2:59
2. "That Same Old Obsession" – 3:46
3. "Old Dan's Records" – 3:05
4. "Lazy Mornin'" – 3:43
5. "You Are What I Am" – 2:37

=== Side 2 ===
1. "Can't Depend on Love" – 3:12
2. "My Pony Won't Go" – 3:50
3. "It's Worth Believin'" – 3:24
4. "Mother of a Miner's Child" – 3:18
5. "Hi'way Songs" – 3:37

== Personnel ==
- Gordon Lightfoot - vocals, guitar, vibraphone
- Red Shea - lead guitar, classical guitar, Dobro
- Terry Clements - lead guitar
- Rick Haynes - bass
- Barry Keane - drums, percussion
- Dave Brown - percussion
- Bruce Good - autoharp
- Larry Good - 5-string banjo
- David Bromberg - slide Dobro ("My Pony Won't Go")
- Nick De Caro - piano, orchestral arrangements
- Ollie Strong - steel guitar

Technical

- Lee Herschberg - engineer
- Ed Thrasher - art direction
- John Reeves - photography

"Special thanks to Bill Richards and Guido Basso and members of the Toronto Symphony Orchestra"
