= Peter Foldy =

Canadian singer

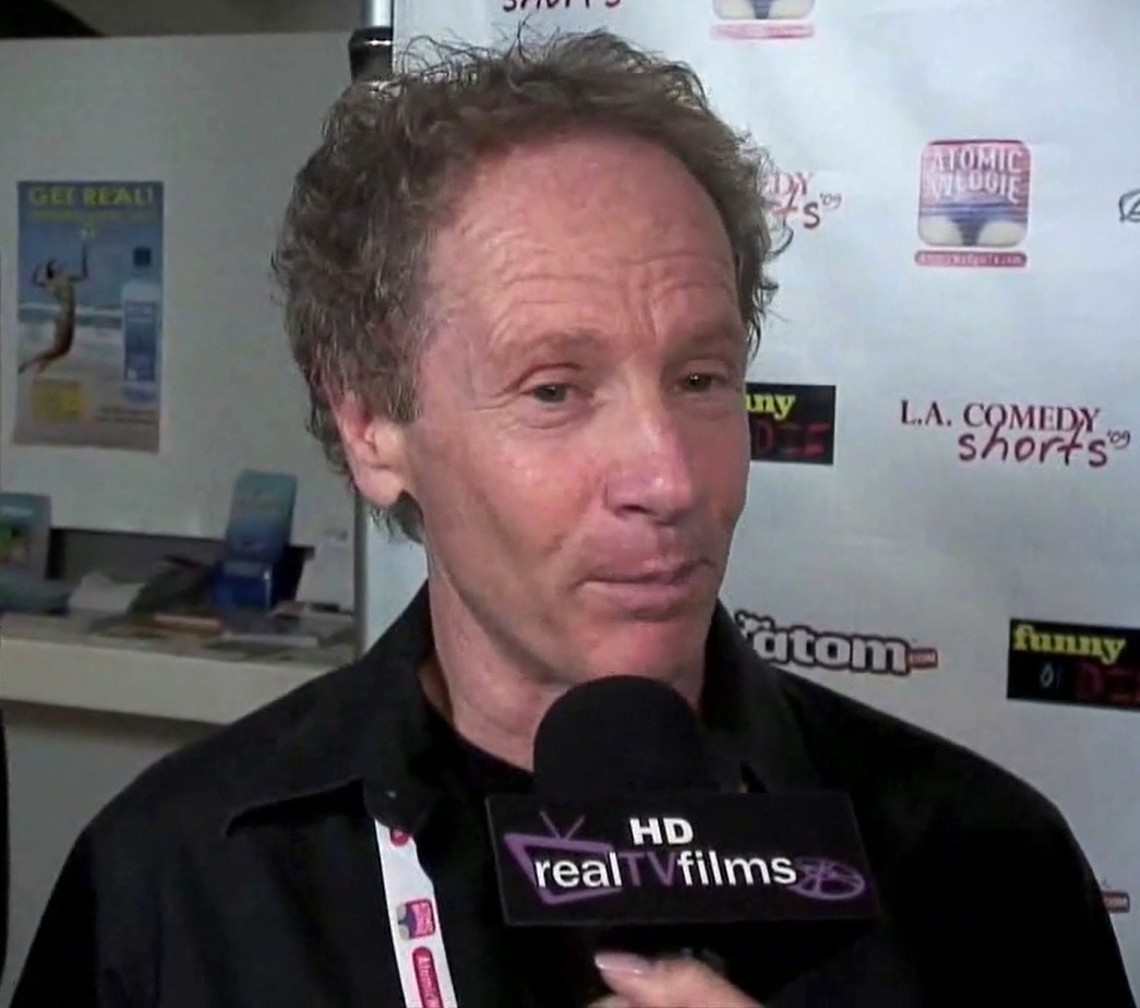
- Foldy in 2009

Background information
- Born: Peter Foldy; Budapest, Hungary
- Occupations: Singer-songwriter; screenwriter; film producer; film director
- Years active: 1973–present
- Labels: Kanata (1973–75); Capitol-EMI (1975–77); Free Flight Records (1977–81); Pacemaker (2003–present)

Peter Foldy is a Hungarian-born recording artist, film producer, director and screenwriter. He has been nominated for two Juno Awards and has had multiple top-ten hits across Canada and the U.S., most notably with his first song "Bondi Junction" which reached number one on the Canadian charts. He has written and directed numerous feature films working with actors such as Paul Rudd, Eugene Levy and Academy Award winner, Louise Fletcher.

== Early life ==
Peter Foldy was born in Budapest, Hungary but soon fled from the then Communist regime with his parents and sister. The family moved to Sydney, where Foldy attended high school and worked as an actor in television commercials. During this time, he also forged a friendship with three young brothers who would later find worldwide success as the Bee Gees.

After a family move to Toronto, Foldy enrolled in film school at York University, once again landing occasional work in Canadian TV commercials. He also formed a rock band that performed in various bars and lounges throughout the city.

== Career ==
=== Music ===
==== Kanata records ====
Foldy soon began writing songs and quickly landed a recording contract as an artist with a small indie label, Kanata Records. His first single, "Bondi Junction", was released in 1973 and the record eventually reached number one on RPM magazine's Adult Contemporary chart on July 7, 1973. Foldy was also featured on the cover of RPM that same week. The record received two Juno Award nominations, including Canadian Pop Music Single of the Year. He was also awarded a 1973 BMI Canada Certificate of Honour from BMI Canada for "Bondi Junction" which was a legitimate national hit across Canada.

Foldy was suddenly appearing on Canadian TV shows, on radio station charts and on the pages of music magazines, including the popular U.S. teen publication, 16 Magazine. "Bondi Junction" was also released in the U.S. on Playboy Records, a label started by Hugh Hefner, where it penetrated the U.S. market place. Cash Box reviewed the song as "a super commercial track that will immediately influence the teen set." The record also peaked at number 113 in Billboard.

==== Capitol-EMI and Polydor ====
In 1975, Foldy was signed by Capitol-EMI of Canada alongside a deal with Polydor in the U.S. His follow-up recordings, "Roxanne" and "Julie-Ann" also reached top-ten status on many charts across Canada, as well as in the U.S.

In 1976, he again received a BMI Canada Certificate of Honour for "Roxanne" and once again made the cover of RPM Weekly on July 3, 1976 (volume 25 #14).

==== Free Flight records ====
On the advice of his manager, Foldy left his deal with Capitol with the promise of bigger things in the United States which, unfortunately, failed to materialize. However, a pop label started by RCA Records in Los Angeles called Free Flight Records signed him a couple of years later. The move to Los Angeles allowed Foldy to continue his musical momentum with the self-written singles "Love City" and "School of Love", songs he co-produced with music producer, Tony Brown.

==== Bronte Road Music ====
In 2016, Foldy released a 10-track CD featuring all-new music entitled Nine Lives. All songs were written and produced by Foldy. The CD received favorable reviews and radio airplay, particularly the single, "Carly". The album has received critical acclaim by both the Toronto Star and Cashbox Canada.

A new single, "Toxic World" was released in 2019. Written by Foldy, it was co-produced with Miklos Malek. In 2020 he released the single, "This Christmas" co-produced with Gerry Stober and in 2021, another single, "Friend-Zone" was released through Foldy's Bronte Road Music label, also co-produced by Foldy and Miklos Malek.

=== Film ===
When Free Flight Records abruptly closed its doors in 1981, Foldy turned his attention back to film, quickly selling his first screenplay, Hot Moves, which became a considerable theatrical and video hit in the mid-1980s. In more recent pop culture, the film has been dubbed as the possible inspiration for the 1999 Hollywood blockbuster American Pie.

More screenplays followed and in the early 1990s, Foldy started directing.

His feature film credits include:

- 1993: Midnight Witness starring Jan-Michael Vincent and Maxwell Caulfield
- 1994: Tryst with Barbara Carrera, David Warner and Academy Award winner Louise Fletcher
- 1996: Widow's Kiss with former Foldy background singer, Beverly D'Angelo
- 1998: Seeds of Doubt with Peter Coyote
- 2000: Silver Man starring Eugene Levy and Joe Pantoliano
- 2019: Love on Repeat starring Jen Lilley
- 2021: Help Wanted ' with Sarah Fisher, Conner Floyd and Preston Ward.

== Current projects ==
Foldy is in development on several feature films as well as two plays, Spin and Liverpool Lads. Spin is a humorous look at the resistance received by Canadian artists when Canadian content regulations were introduced in the early 1970s, while Liverpool Lads is the true story of the first songwriters signed to the Beatles company, Apple, after a random meeting with Paul McCartney in London's High Park. It is based on the book, All You Need Is Luck... Or How I Got a Record Deal by Meeting Paul McCartney, written by Paul Tennant. McCartney has added a glowing quote to the back of the book.

An avid photographer, Foldy has exhibited his black and white photographs.

== Discography ==
=== Albums ===
Year	Title	Record label
1974	Peter Foldy	Kanata
2009	Bondi Junction and Other Hits	Pacemaker/EMI
2014	Nine Lives	Bronte Road Music
2014	Peter Foldy 4 Christmas	Bronte Road Music

=== Singles ===
Year	Title	Record label
1973	"Bondi Junction" / "Alice Mary Jane MacPherson" (#17)(#1AC)	Kanata/Quality
1973	"I'll Never Know" / "Yes, Operator" (#61)(#55AC)	Kanata/Quality
1974	"When I Am So in Love" / "Remember" (#63)(#18AC)	Kanata/Quality
1974	"Christmas Eve with You" / "Spanky" (#21AC)	Kanata/Quality
1975	"Hollywood" / "Paris Bound"	Capitol/EMI
1976	"Roxanne" / "Funny" (#39)(#13AC)	Capitol/EMI
1977	"Julie Ann" / "Paris Bound"	Capitol/EMI
1979	"Love City" / "Turn It Up" (#10AC)	Free Flight/RCA – U.S.
1982	"School of Love" / "Love City" (#25AC)	Rio
1982	"My Christmas Wish for You" / [Instrumental] (#29AC)	Nightflite
1988	"Desperately" (duet with Mona Lisa Young) / [Instrumental] (#26AC)	Filmstreet – U.S.
1988	"Is There Love in Your Heart" / "Desperately" (#25AC)	Southside
2003	"All I Want for Christmas Is You"	Pacemaker
2009	"Change Your World" (with Róbert Gulya)	Pacemaker
2019	"Toxic World"	Bronte Road Music
2020	"This Christmas"	Bronte Road Music
2021	"Friend-Zone"	Bronte Road Music

== Filmography ==
Year	Title	Class	Position	Starring	Awards/notes
1985	Hot Moves	Feature film	Co-writer/associate producer	Jill Schoelen	RIAA Gold Video Award
1992	Homeboys	Feature film	Writer/co-producer	Todd Bridges	
1992	Jamie's Secret	Dramatic short subject	Writer/director	Paul Rudd	Best Director/Best Film – ICVM Awards 1993; Cine Golden Eagle Award Winner 1993
1992	Question of Ethics	Dramatic short subject	Writer/director	Paul Rudd	Cine Golden Eagle Award Winner 1993
1993	Desperate Measures	Dramatic short subject	Writer/director		Best Youth Film – ICVM Awards; Cine Golden Eagle Award Winner 1994
1993	Midnight Witness	Feature film	Writer/director/producer	Maxwell Caulfield and Jan-Michael Vincent	
1994	Tryst	Feature film	Writer/director	Barbara Carrera, David Warner and Louise Fletcher	Aired on Showtime Network USA
1995	Widow's Kiss	Feature film	Co-writer/director	Starring Beverly D'Angelo	HBO World Premier 1995
1996	US Customs Classified	Television	Segment director		Aired on FOX
1996	Seeds of Doubt	Feature film	Director	Peter Coyote	
1996	Irresistible Impulse	Feature film	Director	Doug Jeffrey and Kathy Shower	
1997	Oomba Makoomba	Television	Segment director		Walt Disney Channel
1998	Conversations in Limbo	Dramatic short subject	Director	Jason Priestley and Costas Mandylor	Toronto Short Film Festival Award Winner 1999
1999	More to Love	Misc.	Music supervisor	Maxwell Caulfield	Winner New York International Film Festival 2000
2000	Silver Man	Feature film	Director	Eugene Levy, Joey Pantoliano, Daniel Baldwin and Louise Fletcher	Winner Best Film, Best Director Planet Indie 2000 (Toronto); Winner Jury Prize, Best Feature – Tambay Film Festival (Florida)
2003	My First Time	Television	Co-creator/co-producer		Reality series
2003	Incredible Mrs. Ritchie	Feature film	Associate producer	Gena Rowlands and James Caan	Multiple Emmy Award Winner
2006	Out of Omaha	Misc.	Music supervisor	Dave Foley and Lea Thompson	
2007	Head, Heart & Balls	Dramatic short subject	Writer/director/music	Adam Carolla	
2010	The Wheeler Boys	Feature film	Co-producer	Bill Campbell, Portia Doubleday and Alex Frost	
2014	The Christmas Switch	Feature film	Music supervisor	Natasha Henstridge and Brian Krause	
2015	Fair Haven	Feature film	Music supervisor	Tom Wopat, Michael Grant and Gregory Harrison	
2019	Love on Repeat	Feature film	Director	Jen Lilly, Jonathan Bennett, Andrew Lawrence	
2019	A Thousand Little Cuts	Feature film	Producer	Marina Sirtis, Andrew Creer, Rebecca Liddiard	
2021	Black Bags	Feature film	Producer	Laura Vandervoort, Olesya Rulin	
2021	Help Wanted	Feature film	Director	Sarah Fisher, Conner Floyd, Preston Ward	
2021	Looking For Dr. Love	Feature film	Director	Anna Marie Dobbins, Julian Shaw	
2021	House of Lies	Feature film	Producer	Katerina Eichenberger, Rib Hillis, Colt Prattes	
