= Gary and Dave =

Canadian music duo (1969–1979)

- Origin: Charlottetown, Prince Edward Island, Canada; Newmarket, Ontario, Canada
- Genre: Pop rock
- Years active: 1969–1979
- Labels: Quality; Axe; Polydor
- Past members: Gary Weeks; Dave Beckett

Gary and Dave were a Canadian pop duo composed of Gary Weeks (born May 22, 1950, in Charlottetown, Prince Edward Island) and David Lloyd George "Dave" Beckett (born July 5, 1949, in Newmarket, Ontario). They are best known for their 1973 song "Could You Ever Love Me Again".

== History ==
Weeks and Beckett had been friends since grade school in the early 1960s. They played in numerous bands until 1966, when the pair competed in a United Appeal concert and came in fourth out of five hundred acts. They began to play the festival circuit, and became a top attraction at Expo '70 in Osaka, Japan.

Gary and Dave's first recordings were made in 1969; in 1970 they had a single on Quality 1977 - "Tender Woman" b/w "I'm A Rider." In 1972, they signed with Greg Hambleton's Axe Records label, and made two singles that didn't see much action. Then in 1973, they released their own composition, "Could You Ever Love Me Again." It entered the RPM 100 on July 14, 1973, at #98. It picked up a bullet at #44 on September 8, lost it at #31 on September 22, gained it back on October 20 at #10. It was #2 with a bullet for two weeks in a row, and then hit #1 without the bullet on November 17.

Gary and Dave toured with The Stampeders in 1973 to promote "Could You Ever Love Me Again," and their first album. The single was released in twenty-two countries. It did particularly well in Australia. The single became their only entry on the U.S. Billboard Hot 100 and Easy Listening charts, and was a Top 20 hit in the Detroit/Windsor market thanks to airplay support from CKLW.

The pair continued to record with Hambleton in 1974, and toured in western Canada with Jay Telfer. They had further hits with "I Fell In Love With You Sometime" and a cover of Carole King's "It Might As Well Rain Until September." They had six further singles through 1976, the last one on Polydor, and made two albums for Axe plus a Greatest Hits compilation.

Both Gary and Dave had a long-standing love of flying. In 1975, they left music altogether to pursue careers as pilots with Airtransit STOL Canada. They did return to their music careers for a time, but soon returned to their piloting careeres full time.

Gary Weeks later became a pastor, and left Canada for Ireland, where he worked as a missionary.

Gary had three sons, Ben, Jesse and Daniel. Daniel became the youngest pilot in Canada when he got his licence on his 16th birthday after Gary completed introductory flight training with him. In 2005, Gospel Folio Press published Gary's biography, Could You Ever Love Me Again: The Gary Weeks Story of Forgiveness.

== Discography ==
=== Albums ===
- Together (1973)
- All in the Past (1974)
- 14 Greatest Hits (1977)
- Together Re-Issue Axe Records (2014)
- Forever Re-Issue Axe Records (2014)

=== Singles ===
Year	Song	CAN	US	AUS
1973	"Here It Comes Again"	57	-	-
1973	"Could You Ever Love Me Again"	1	92	7
1974	"I Fell in Love With You Sometime"	25	-	-
1974	"It Might as Well Rain Until September"	31	-	-
1974	"I May Never See You Again"	35	-	-
1975	"What Can You Do About It"	90	-	-
1975	"All in the Past"	64	-	-
1975	"I Can't Find the Words"	92	-	-
