= Axe Records =

Canadian record label

- Founded: 1972
- Founder: Greg Hambleton
- Country of origin: Canada

Axe Records is a Canadian record label founded by Greg Hambleton in 1972. After a number of years of inactivity, the label was revived in 2013. It is particularly notable as the original recording label of the Canadian duo Gary and Dave.

== History ==
Axe Records was founded by Hambleton in 1972. The label was initially distributed by London Records of Canada. The first artists signed to the label included theCanadian group Thundermug. In 1974, Axe moved into offices in the Toronto Sound Studios building on Overlea Boulevard.

By 1975, the label was distributed by GRT Records in Canada. The company had no consistent international distribution. Its most successful artist duo, Gary and Dave, was distributed by London Records in the United States. Its principal rock band, Thundermug, was distributed by the Big Tree and the Epic labels and, from 1975, at the initiative of Hambleton, by Mercury Records. International licensing arrangements were signed with EMI Electrola, Basart and Decca UK.

The label's major recording success was with Gary and Dave. It also released records by Thundermug, Fergus, The Sattalites, Rain (with Charity Brown), Keith Hampshire, Major Hoople's Boarding House, Steel River, Tom Northcott and Walter Ostanek, among others.

In 2013, the label was revived by Hambleton, to re-issue and market the original recordings by its original artists, as well as to sign new artists.
