= 2003 in Irish music =

A summary of the year 2003 in the Irish music industry.

== Summary ==
- On July 16, R.E.M. played to a crowd of 16,000 at Marlay Park in Dublin, arriving on stage at 9 p.m. They were supported by Orager and Starsailor.
- On December 7–8, Blur played the Olympia Theatre, Dublin, in their last Irish shows before they went on hiatus until their return to the country to headline Oxegen 2009.

== Bands formed ==
- The Blizzards
- Boss Volenti
- The Coronas
- Hal
- The Marshals
- Royseven (then known as Jove)

== Bands disbanded ==
- The Cranberries (hiatus)
- Skindive

== Bands reformed ==
- The Stunning

== Albums & EPs ==
Below is a list of notable albums & EPs released by Irish artists in Ireland in 2003.

- Seize the Day - Damien Dempsey (May 16, 2003)
- So Much for the City – The Thrills (May 27, 2003)
- Forward – Turn (May 30, 2003)'
- Music in Mouth – Bell X1 (July 18, 2003)
- Square One – David Kitt (September 2003)
- Get What You Need – The Undertones (September 30, 2003)
- Living – Paddy Casey (October 17, 2003)

Unknown

- My Sanctuary – Autamata (2003)
- Live from the Union Chapel – Damien Rice (2003)
- Hotel Room EP – Fionn Regan (2003) (EP)
- Set List – The Frames (2003) (Live album)
- The Roads Outgrown – The Frames (2003) (EP)

== Singles ==
Below is a list of notable singles released by Irish artists in Ireland in 2003.

Issue date	Song title	Artist	Source	Sales
__ February	"Always and Forever"	JJ72		
7 March	"Family Tree"	Paddy Casey		
25 April	"White Water Song"	Bell X1		
11 July	"Tongue"	Bell X1		
12 September	"Fake"	The Frames		
3 October	"Saints and Sinners"	Paddy Casey		
6 October	"Snakes and Snakes"	Bell X1		
5 December	"The Lucky One"	Paddy Casey		

Date unknown

- "Spitting Games" – Snow Patrol (2003)
- "One Horse Town" – The Thrills (2003)
- "Big Sur" – The Thrills (2003)
- "Santa Cruz (You're Not That Far)" – The Thrills (2003)
- "Don't Steal Our Sun" – The Thrills (2003)

== Festivals ==
=== Witnness 2003 ===
- Witnness 2003 was the fourth and final Witnness festival to take place. It took place in a new venue, Punchestown Racecourse in County Kildare on Saturday July 12 and Sunday July 13. Acts to appear included Coldplay, Damien Rice, The Frames, The Cardigans, The Walls, The Streets, David Gray, Manic Street Preachers, Super Furry Animals, The Polyphonic Spree, Röyksopp, The Coral, Gemma Hayes, Mogwai, The Thrills, The Rapture, OK Go, Turn, Berkeley, Fionn Regan, Paddy Casey, Snow Patrol and Bell X1. The White Stripes scheduled appearance was cancelled due to frontman Jack White suffering a broken hand. The Flaming Lips were stepped up the bill to replace The White Stripes and delivered a well-received set which included a version of White Stripes' single "Seven Nation Army".

=== Heineken Green Energy ===
- Heineken Green Energy took place for the 8th year in 2003. It was held in Dublin over the May Bank Holiday weekend. 2003's venues included Dublin Castle, the Ambassador, Temple Bar Music Centre, The Village and Whelans as well as 20 other key music venues in Dublin City. Over the weekend approximately 40,000 people attended in excess of 17 live gigs. Musicians to play the 2003 festival included Groove Armada, Moloko, Craig David, Stereophonics and Beck.

=== Slane 2003 ===
- Slane 2003 took place on Saturday August 23 and was headlined by Red Hot Chili Peppers. Support came from Foo Fighters, Queens of the Stone Age, PJ Harvey, Feeder, Morcheeba and Halite. Tickets sold out 2 and a half hours after going on sale.

== Music awards ==
=== 2003 Meteor Awards ===
The 2003 Meteor Awards were hosted by comedian Dara Ó Briain in February 2003. Below are the winners:

Award	Winner(s)
Best Irish Male	Mundy
Best Irish Female	Carly Hennessy
Best Irish Band	U2
Best Irish Album	Skylarkin' (Mic Christopher)
Best New Irish Act	The Thrills
Best Irish Pop Act	Westlife
Best Irish Dance Act	Luke Thomas
Best Live Performance	Red Hot Chili Peppers (Lansdowne Road 2002)
Best Irish DJ	Ian Dempsey
Hope for 2003	Rubyhorse
Best Folk/Traditional	John Spillane
Best Country/Roots Artist	Jerry Fish
Best International Male	Eminem
Best International Female	Avril Lavigne
Best International Band	Coldplay
Best International Album	By the Way (Red Hot Chili Peppers)
Industry Award	Phil Coulter
Lifetime Achievement Award	Bob Geldof
Humanitarian Award	Bono
