= Mac Davis discography =

- Studio albums: 19
- Compilation albums: 8
- Singles: 38

Mac Davis was an American singer-songwriter. His discography consists of 19 studio albums and 38 singles. Thirty of those singles charted on the U.S. Billboard Hot Country Songs chart between 1970 and 1986. His song "Baby Don't Get Hooked on Me" reached number one on both the Billboard Hot 100 and Adult Contemporary charts in September 1972, spending three weeks atop each. Billboard magazine ranked it as the number eight song of 1972.

== Studio albums ==
=== 1970s ===
| Title | Album details | Peak chart positions | | | | Certifications (sales threshold) |
| Title | Album details | US Country | US | AUS | CAN | Certifications (sales threshold) |
|---|---|---|---|---|---|---|
| Song Painter | Release date: May 10, 1970; Label: Columbia Records | 35 | 182 | — | — | |
| I Believe in Music | Release date: November 1971; Label: Columbia Records | — | 160 | — | — | |
| Baby Don't Get Hooked on Me | Release date: August 1972; Label: Columbia Records | 27 | 11 | 63 | 9 | US: Platinum |
| Mac Davis | Release date: February 1973; Label: Columbia Records | 19 | 120 | — | — | |
| Stop and Smell the Roses | Release date: March 1974; Label: Columbia Records | 2 | 13 | 60 | 10 | US: Platinum |
| All the Love in the World | Release date: December 1974; Label: Columbia Records | 6 | 21 | — | 33 | US: Gold |
| Burnin' Thing | Release date: June 1975; Label: Columbia Records | 9 | 64 | — | — | |
| Forever Lovers | Release date: February 1976; Label: Columbia Records | 11 | 156 | — | — | |
| Thunder in the Afternoon | Release date: February 25, 1977; Label: Columbia Records | 38 | — | — | — | |
| Fantasy | Release date: May 5, 1978; Label: Columbia Records | 43 | 207 | — | — | |
"—" denotes releases that did not chart

=== 1980s and 1990s ===
| Title | Album details | Peak chart positions | | | | Certifications (sales threshold) |
| Title | Album details | US Country | US | AUS | CAN | Certifications (sales threshold) |
|---|---|---|---|---|---|---|
| It's Hard to Be Humble | Release date: March 11, 1980; Label: Casablanca Records | 3 | 69 | 48 | 29 | US: Gold |
| Texas in My Rearview Mirror | Release date: September 8, 1980; Label: Casablanca Records | 12 | 67 | — | — | |
| Midnight Crazy | Release date: September 14, 1981; Label: Casablanca Records | 19 | 174 | — | — | |
| Forty 82 | Release date: November 8, 1982; Label: Casablanca Records | — | — | — | — | |
| Who's Lovin' You | Release date: November 4, 1983; Label: Columbia Records | — | — | — | — | |
| Soft Talk | Release date: January 16, 1984; Label: Mercury Records | 65 | — | — | — | |
| Till I Made It with You | Release date: May 23, 1985; Label: MCA Records | 48 | — | — | — | |
| Somewhere in America | Release date: June 16, 1986; Label: MCA Records | — | — | — | — | |
| Will Write Songs for Food | Release date: 1994; Label: Columbia Records | — | — | — | — | |
"—" denotes releases that did not chart

== Compilations ==
| Title | Album details | Peak positions | Certifications (sales threshold) |
| Title | Album details | US Country | Certifications (sales threshold) |
|---|---|---|---|
| The Mac Davis Collection | Release date: 1979; Label: CBS Records Canada | — | |
| Greatest Hits | Release date: November 30, 1979; Label: Columbia Records | 44 | US: Gold |
| Very Best and More | Release date: September 10, 1984; Label: Casablanca Records | — | |
| The Best of Mac Davis | Release date: October 24, 2000; Label: Razor & Tie | — | |
| 20th Century Masters: The Millennium Collection | Release date: September 12, 2006; Label: Mercury Records | — | |
| The Best of Mac Davis (Reissue of the 2000 Razor & Tie album) | Release date: March 13, 2007; Label: Columbia/Legacy | — | |
| A Little More Action Please: The Anthology 1970-1985 | Release date: May 21, 2013; Label: Raven Australia | — | |
| Hard to Be Humble: The Best of Mac Davis | Release date: October 22, 2013; Label: Hux Records | — | |
"—" denotes releases that did not chart

== Singles ==
=== 1960s and 1970s ===
| Year | Title | Peak chart positions | | | | | | | Album |
| Year | Title | US Country | US | US AC | AUS | CAN Country | CAN | CAN AC | Album |
|---|---|---|---|---|---|---|---|---|---|
| 1962 | "I'm a Poor Loser" | — | — | — | — | — | — | — | — |
| 1963 | "A Little Dutch Town" | — | — | — | — | — | — | — | — |
| 1963 | "Honey Love" | — | — | — | — | — | — | — | — |
| 1965 | "Bad Scene" | — | — | — | — | — | — | — | — |
| 1968 | "Memories" | — | — | — | — | — | — | — | — |
| 1970 | "Whoever Finds This, I Love You" | 43 | 53 | 25 | — | — | 54 | — | Song Painter |
| 1970 | "I'll Paint You a Song" | 68 | 110 | 14 | 68 | — | — | — | Song Painter |
| 1970 | "I Believe in Music" | — | 117 | 25 | — | — | — | — | I Believe in Music |
| 1971 | "Beginning to Feel the Pain" | — | 92 | — | — | — | — | — | Song Painter |
| 1972 | "Baby Don't Get Hooked on Me" | 26 | 1 | 1 | 2 | 1 | 2 | 1 | Baby Don't Get Hooked on Me |
| 1972 | "Everybody Loves a Love Song" | — | 63 | 13 | — | — | 51 | 43 | Baby Don't Get Hooked on Me |
| 1973 | "Dream Me Home" | 47 | 73 | 32 | 91 | 46 | 48 | 75 | Baby Don't Get Hooked on Me |
| 1973 | "Your Side of the Bed" | 36 | 88 | 28 | — | 19 | — | 19 | Mac Davis |
| 1973 | "Kiss It and Make It Better" | 29 | 105 | — | — | 64 | — | — | Stop and Smell the Roses |
| 1974 | "One Hell of a Woman" | — | 11 | 20 | 43 | 42 | 11 | 39 | Stop and Smell the Roses |
| 1974 | "Stop and Smell the Roses" | 40 | 9 | 1 | 78 | 11 | 3 | 5 | Stop and Smell the Roses |
| 1975 | "Rock 'N' Roll (I Gave You the Best Years of My Life)" | 29 | 15 | 4 | — | — | 40 | 14 | All the Love in the World |
| 1975 | "(If You Add) All the Love in the World" | 69 | 54 | 31 | — | — | 55 | 31 | All the Love in the World |
| 1975 | "Burnin' Thing" | 31 | 53 | 20 | — | — | 47 | 14 | Burnin' Thing |
| 1975 | "I Still Love You (You Still Love Me)" | 81 | — | 38 | — | — | — | 38 | Burnin' Thing |
| 1976 | "Forever Lovers" | 17 | 76 | 32 | — | 8 | — | 17 | Forever Lovers |
| 1976 | "Every Now and Then" | 34 | — | 32 | — | — | — | — | Forever Lovers |
| 1977 | "Picking Up the Pieces of My Life" | 42 | — | 25 | — | 37 | — | 17 | Thunder in the Afternoon |
| 1978 | "Music in My Life" | 92 | — | 22 | — | — | — | 6 | Fantasy |
"—" denotes releases that did not chart

=== 1980s ===
| Year | Title | Peak chart positions | | | | | Album |
| Year | Title | US Country | US | AUS | CAN Country | CAN | Album |
|---|---|---|---|---|---|---|---|
| 1980 | "It's Hard to Be Humble" | 10 | 43 | 9 | 4 | 14 | Hard to Be Humble |
| 1980 | "Let's Keep It That Way" | 10 | — | — | 15 | — | Hard to Be Humble |
| 1980 | "Texas in My Rearview Mirror" | 9 | 51 | — | 40 | — | Texas in My Rearview Mirror |
| 1981 | "Hooked on Music" | 2 | 102 | — | 30 | — | Texas in My Rearview Mirror |
| 1981 | "Secrets" | 47 | 76 | — | — | — | Texas in My Rearview Mirror |
| 1981 | "You're My Bestest Friend" | 5 | 106 | — | 26 | — | Midnight Crazy |
| 1982 | "Rodeo Clown" | 37 | — | — | — | — | Texas in My Rearview Mirror |
| 1982 | "The Beer Drinkin' Song" | 52 | — | — | — | — | Forty '82 |
| 1982 | "Lying Here Lying" | 62 | — | — | — | — | Forty '82 |
| 1984 | "Most of All" | 41 | — | — | — | — | Soft Talk |
| 1984 | "Caroline's Still in Georgia" | 76 | — | — | — | — | Soft Talk |
| 1985 | "I Never Made Love (Till I Made It with You)" | 10 | — | — | 6 | — | Till I Made It with You |
| 1985 | "I Feel the Country Callin' Me" | 34 | — | — | — | — | Till I Made It with You |
| 1986 | "Sexy Young Girl" | 46 | — | — | — | — | Till I Made It with You |
| 1986 | "Somewhere in America" | 65 | — | — | — | — | Somewhere in America |
"—" denotes releases that did not chart
