= A Good Thing Lost =

Compilation album by The Poppy Family
- Released: 1996
- Genre: Psychedelic pop
- Label: What Are Records?
- Producer: Terry Jacks

A Good Thing Lost is a compilation album by The Poppy Family, released in 1996 in Canada and later on iTunes in America with a second cover. The compilation was essentially The Poppy Family's greatest hits collection but also included a number of Susan Jacks' solo recordings. The album featured an alternate mix of "There's No Blood In Bone" and previously unreleased track "Evil Overshadows Joe", along with the U.S. version of "That's Where I Went Wrong" with the lead guitar being recorded in Nashville, Tennessee.

== Track listing ==
1. "Beyond the Clouds" – 2:37
2. "Free from the City" – 2:18
3. "What Can the Matter Be?" – 2:16
4. "Which Way You Goin' Billy?" – 3:23
5. "Happy Island" – 2:53
6. "There's No Blood In Bone" – 3:01
7. "A Good Thing Lost" – 2:03
8. "You Took My Moonlight Away" – 2:43
9. "Shadows on My Wall" – 2:30
10. "That's Where I Went Wrong" – 2:32
11. "Where Evil Grows" – 2:51
12. "I Was Wondering" – 3:02
13. "Tryin'" – 3:02
14. "Winter Milk" – 3:24
15. "Good Friends?" – 2:39
16. "I'll See You There" – 3:20
17. "You Don't Know What Love Is" – 2:49
18. "I Thought of You Again" – 2:27
19. "Another Year, Another Day" – 2:35
20. "Evil Overshadows Joe" – 2:29
21. "That's Where I Went Wrong" (U.S. Version) – 2:33
