= Which Way You Goin' Billy =

There are two articles for Canadian band The Poppy Family:

- Which Way You Goin' Billy? (album)
- "Which Way You Goin' Billy? (song)"
