= Poppy Seeds =

Studio album by The Poppy Family
- Released: 1971
- Genre: Psychedelic pop
- Label: London
- Producer: Terry Jacks

The Poppy Family chronology
Which Way You Goin' Billy? (1969)	Poppy Seeds (1971)

Poppy Seeds, released in 1971, was the second and final studio album from Vancouver, British Columbia band The Poppy Family. The album has yet to be released on modern formats and remains a rare vinyl. The tracks are available as part of the CD release of their first album, however.

Singles released from the album were "Where Evil Grows," "I Was Wondering," "No Good to Cry" (previously a minor 1966 hit by The Wildweeds), "Good Friends?," and "I'll See You There." "Where Evil Grows" was the album's biggest hit, reaching #6 in Canada and #45 in the United States.

== Track listing ==
1. "No Good to Cry" – 2:35 (Al Anderson)
2. "Tryin'" – 3:03 (Terry Jacks)
3. "Good Friends?" – 2:37 (Terry Jacks)
4. "I Started Loving You Again" – 2:14 (Merle Haggard)
5. "I'll See You There" – 3:17 (Terry Jacks)
6. "I Was Wondering" – 3:00 (Terry Jacks)
7. "Where Evil Grows" – 2:48 (Terry Jacks)
8. "Living Too Close to the Ground" – 2:12 (T. Slater)
9. "Someone Must Have Jumped" – 3:40 (Terry Jacks)
10. "So Used to Loving You" – 1:59 (Sonny Curtis)
11. "Remember the Rain" – 2:46 (Bob Lind)
12. "Winter Milk" – 3:25 (Joe Fahrni)

== Personnel ==
- Susan Jacks: vocals, percussion
- Terry Jacks: vocals
- Brian Cavossa: producer, mandolin, backup vocals
