= All the Love in the World =

All the Love in the World may refer to:

- All the Love in the World (album), a 1974 album by Mac Davis
- "All the Love in the World" (Dionne Warwick song), from the album Heartbreaker (1982)
- "All the Love in the World" (The Corrs song), from the album In Blue (2001)
- "All the Love in the World", a song by Nine Inch Nails from the album With Teeth (2005)
- "All the Love in the World", a 1969 single by British psychedelic group Consortium written by Geoff Simpson
- "All the Love in the World", a single released from the Korgis album Sticky George (1981)
- "All the Love" (The Outfield song), also known as "All the Love in the World"

== See also ==
- "Not for All the Love in the World", a single by The Thrills from the album Let's Bottle Bohemia
