= Teenager (The Thrills album) =

Studio album by the Thrills
- Released: 22 July 2007
- Recorded: 2007
- Genre: Indie rock
- Length: 40:55
- Label: Virgin
- Producer: Tony Hoffer

The Thrills chronology
Let's Bottle Bohemia (2004)	Teenager (2007)

Singles from Teenagers
- 1. "Nothing Changes Around Here" Released: July 16, 2007; 2. "The Midnight Choir" Released: October 29, 2007

Professional ratings
Review scores
Source	Rating
AbsolutePunk	66% link
AllMusic	link
BBC	Positive link
Drowned in Sound	8/10 2007 link
Entertainment Weekly	A-
NME	2007 link
The Observer	2007
Pitchfork	6.9/10 link
Planet Sound	8/10 stars
Uncut	2007
Yahoo! Music UK	2007 link

Teenager is the third album from Irish band the Thrills. It was released on 22 July 2007 in Ireland and three days later in Europe. The first single from the album was "Nothing Changes Around Here". The second release taken from the album was "The Midnight Choir" which was released as a download-only single. Teenager reached No. 48 on the UK Albums Chart.

The album was demoed and written in Ireland, with the band recording and mixing the album in Vancouver and California.

The Thrills were dropped by EMI after the poor sales performance of Teenager.

The cover photograph, Wild Horses, 1979, is by Joseph Szabo.

== Track listing ==
1. "The Midnight Choir" – 3:41
2. "This Year" – 2:55
3. "Nothing Changes Around Here" – 4:12
4. "Restaurant" – 3:27
5. "I Came All This Way" – 3:40
6. "Long Forgotten Song" – 3:16
7. "I'm So Sorry" – 2:52
8. "No More Empty Words" – 3:23
9. "Teenager" – 3:25
10. "Should've Known Better" – 3:30
11. "There's Joy to Be Found … The Boy Who Caught All the Breaks" – 6:34

Deluxe Edition Bonus Tracks

12. "The End of Innocence" – 3:24
13. "Suzanne" – 3:07
14. "One Horse Town" – 3:14

== Personnel ==
=== Musicians ===
- Conor Deasy (Vocals, Harmonica, Acoustic Guitar)
- Daniel Ryan (Guitars, Bass, Mandolin, Banjo, Backing Vocals)
- Pádraic McMahon (Bass, Guitars, Backing Vocals)
- Kevin Horan (Piano, Organs, Backing Vocals)
- Ben Carrigan (Drums and Percussion)

=== Mixing and production ===
Tony Hoffer (who produced So Much for the City) produced and mixed the entire album except for Track 3, which was mixed by Bob Clearmountain.

== Release history ==
Release date	Country
22 July 2007	Ireland, Germany
25 July 2007	United Kingdom
23 October 2007	United States of America
