= Which Way You Goin' Billy? =

Which Way You Goin' Billy? may refer to:

- Which Way You Goin' Billy? (album), released in 1969 by The Poppy Family
  - "Which Way You Goin' Billy?" (song), the title track of the album
