= Stop and Smell the Roses =

Stop and Smell the Roses may refer to:

- Stop and Smell the Roses (Mac Davis album), a 1974 Mac Davis album
  - "Stop and Smell the Roses" (song), a 1974 song written and first recorded by Mac Davis
- Stop and Smell the Roses (Ringo Starr album), a 1981 Ringo Starr album
  - "Stop and Take the Time to Smell the Roses", a 1981 song written by Ringo Starr and Harry Nilsson for the album
- "Stop and Smell the Roses", a 1984 Television Personalies song included on their album The Painted Word
- Stop and Smell the Roses, a 2009 Mutts book
- Stop and Smell the Roses, a film by Bruce Payne
- "Do You Ever Stop and Smell the Roses?", a 2019 single released by Pittsburgh Slim

== See also ==
- "Smell the Roses", 2017 single by Roger Waters
