= Forever Lovers =

Forever Lovers may refer to:

- Forever Lovers (Mac Davis album), 1976
- "Forever Lovers", a song by George Adams and Don Pullen from Live at Montmartre
- "Forever Lovers", a 1987 song by Italo disco duo Italian Boys
