= Whatever Happened to Corey Haim? =

2004 single by the Thrills

Single by the Thrills

from the album Let's Bottle Bohemia
- B-side: "Big Sur"; "If I Wasn't So Pretty"
- Released: 30 August 2004
- Length: 3:34
- Label: Virgin
- Songwriters: Ben Carrigan, Conor Deasy, Kevin Horan, Padraic McMahon, Daniel Ryan
- Producers: Tony Hoffer, Dave Sardy

The Thrills singles chronology
"Don't Steal Our Sun" (2003)	"Whatever Happened to Corey Haim?" (2004)	"Not for All the Love in the World" (2004)

"Whatever Happened to Corey Haim?" is the first single from Irish alternative rock band the Thrills' second album, Let's Bottle Bohemia (2004). It was released on 30 August 2004, reaching number 17 in Ireland and number 22 on the UK Singles Chart.

== Track listing ==
All tracks are written by the Thrills.

CD single
No.	Title	Length
1.	"Whatever Happened to Corey Haim?"	3:34
2.	"Big Sur"" (Brooklyn's Own D.Sardy Mix)	3:08

CD maxi single
No.	Title	Length
1.	"Whatever Happened to Corey Haim?"	3:34
2.	"If I Wasn't So Pretty"	3:26
3.	"Whatever Happened to Corey Haim?" (Zane Lowe Session)	3:32
4.	"Whatever Happened to Corey Haim?" (video)	3:34

iTunes digital download
No.	Title	Length
1.	"Whatever Happened to Corey Haim?"	3:35
2.	"Big Sur" (U.S. radio mix)	3:26
3.	"Whatever Happened to Corey Haim?" (demo version—often mis-titled "If I Wasn't So Pretty")	3:33

== Charts ==
Chart (2004)	Peak position
Ireland (IRMA)	17
Scotland Singles (OCC)	20
UK Singles (OCC)	22

== See also ==
- Corey Haim
