= Second Guessing =

Second Guessing may refer to:

- "Second Guessing" (song), by Florida Georgia Line, 2020; covered by co-writer Griffen Palmer, 2023
- "Second Guessing", a song by Arlo Parks, 2019
- "Second Guessing", a song by Jonny Lang from Wander This World, 1998
- "Second Guessing", a song by R.E.M. from Reckoning, 1984
- "Second Guessing", a song by the Thrills from Nothing Changes Around Here, 2007
