= All the Love in the World (album) =

1974 album by Mac Davis

Studio album by Mac Davis
- Released: 1974
- Studio: FAME Studios, Muscle Shoals, Alabama
- Genre: Country, pop
- Length: 33:58
- Label: Columbia
- Producer: Rick Hall

Mac Davis chronology
Stop and Smell the Roses (1974)	All the Love in the World (1974)	Burnin' Thing (1975)

Professional ratings
Review scores
Source	Rating
Music Week	2/4 stars

All the Love in the World is a 1974 album by American singer-songwriter Mac Davis released on Columbia Records immediately following his album Stop and Smell the Roses also released in 1974. It peaked at number 21 on the Billboard 200 albums chart and reached number 6 on Billboard's Top Country Albums chart. It also charted in Canada reaching 33 on the country's RPM charts. Containing many hits including "(If You Add) All the Love in the World" and very notably "Rock 'N' Roll (I Gave You the Best Years of My Life)" written by Kevin Johnson covered later by Johnson himself, by Terry Jacks, The Cats and many others, the album was certified gold in the United States.

== Track listing ==
No.	Title	Writer(s)	Length
1.	"Rock 'N' Roll (I Gave You the Best Years of My Life)"	Kevin Johnson	3:25
2.	"I Still Love You, Still Love Me"	Mac Davis, Mark James	3:00
3.	"Boogie Woogie Mama"	Davis, James	2:50
4.	"Magic Mystery"	Davis, James	3:08
5.	"Every Woman"	Dave Mason	3:06
6.	"If You Add All The Love In The World"	Ian Page	3:40
7.	"Freedom Trail"	Davis, James	3:23
8.	"Smiley"	Davis, James	2:56
9.	"Fall In Love With Your Wife"	Davis	1:39
10.	"Emily Suzanne"	Davis	3:13
11.	"Biff, The Friendly Purple Bear"	Deena Kaye Rose	3:38

== Credits and personnel ==
- Mark James - electric guitar
- Ken Bell - guitar
- Travis Wammack - guitar
- Jerry Bridges - bass
- Al Lester - fiddle
- James Brown - keyboards
- Tim Henson - keyboards
- Roger Clark - drums, percussion
- Ben Cauley, Harrison Calloway, Harvey Thompson, Muscle Shoals Horns, Ronnie Eades - horn
- Mac Davis - Jew's harp
- Rhodes, Chalmers & Rhodes - Backing vocals

Technical

- Rick Hall - Producer, Recording engineer
- Gary Klein - Associate producer (tracks: 1, 5, 6)
- Jack Nitzsche - Arrangement (tracks: 1, 5, 6)
- Jimmie Haskell - String arrangement
- Bruce Botnick - Engineer (tracks: 1, 5, 6)
- Don Young - Quadraphonic Remix Engineer
- Lacy O'Neal - Recording engineer
- Larry Hamby - Recording engineer
- Guy Webster - Photography
- John Brogna - Design
