= Don't Steal Our Sun =

2003 single by the Thrills

Single by the Thrills

from the album So Much for the City
- B-side: "Last Night I Dreamed That Somebody Loved Me"
- Released: 24 November 2003
- Length: 2:50
- Label: Virgin
- Composer: The Thrills
- Lyricist: Conor Deasy
- Producer: Tony Hoffer

The Thrills singles chronology
"Big Sur" (2003)	"Don't Steal Our Sun" (2003)	"Whatever Happened to Corey Haim?" (2004)

"Don't Steal Our Sun" is the fourth and final single released by Irish band the Thrills from their debut album, So Much for the City (2003). Released on 24 November 2003, the song reached number 45 on the UK Singles Chart and number 38 in Ireland.

== Track listing ==
All tracks are written by Conor Deasy (lyrics) and the Thrills (music) except where noted.

UK CD1
No.	Title	Length
1.	"Don't Steal Our Sun"	2:50
2.	"One Horse Town" (live from Abbey Road Studios)	3:18

UK CD2
No.	Title	Writer(s)	Length
1.	"Don't Steal Our Sun"		2:50
2.	"Last Night I Dreamt That Somebody Loved Me"	Steven Morrissey; Johnny Marr	3:36
3.	"Santa Cruz (You're Not That Far)" (acoustic version)		4:05
4.	"Don't Steal Our Sun" (video)		3:05

UK 7-inch single
No.	Title	Writer(s)	Length
1.	"Don't Steal Our Sun"		2:50
2.	"The One I Love" (Radio 1 Session)	Bill Berry; Peter Buck; Mike Mills; Michael Stipe	3:12

== Charts ==
Chart (2003)	Peak position
Ireland (IRMA)	38
Scottish Singles Sales (Official Charts)	48
UK Singles (Official Charts)	45
