= Let's Bottle Bohemia =

Studio album by The Thrills
- Released: 13 September 2004
- Recorded: 2003–2004
- Genre: Indie rock
- Length: 42:07
- Label: Virgin
- Producer: Dave Sardy

The Thrills chronology
So Much for the City (2003)	Let's Bottle Bohemia (2004)	Teenager (2007)

Singles from Let's Bottle Bohemia
- 1. "Whatever Happened to Corey Haim?" Released: 30 August 2004; 2. "Not for All the Love in the World" Released: 15 November 2004; 3. "The Irish Keep Gate-crashing" Released: 21 March 2005

Professional ratings
Review scores
Source	Rating
AllMusic	3.5/5 stars
Pitchfork Media	6.0/10
Rolling Stone	2/5 stars

Let's Bottle Bohemia is the second album by the Irish indie/rock band The Thrills. It was produced and mixed by Dave Sardy. The album went platinum in Ireland in 2005, debuting at #1. In the UK, the album debuted at #9 and remained in the charts for 4 weeks.

In an interview in 2004, lead singer Conor Deasy described the band's upcoming second album:

I think [the new album's] great. I'm really excited about it. It's different from the first record. It's a step on, I think. A lot of bands, in the last few years, have released good first albums and haven't really stepped up to the challenge on the second one. [Our new album] doesn't really sound like a record people are making quite now. It's tougher, but it's also quite beautiful as well. It's a nice kind of mixture. It's a little more ambiguous as well.

— Conor Deasy

== Track listing ==
1. "Tell Me Something I Don't Know" – 3:56
2. "Whatever Happened To Corey Haim?" – 3:34
3. "Faded Beauty Queens" (guest appearance by Peter Buck on mandolin & Van Dyke Parks on accordion) – 3:40
4. "Saturday Night" – 2:31
5. "Not for All the Love in the World" – 4:06
6. "Our Wasted Lives" – 3:46
7. "You Can't Fool Old Friends with Limousines" – 3:12
8. "Found My Rosebud" – 4:19
9. "The Curse of Comfort" (guest appearance by Peter Buck on guitar) – 3:01
10. "The Irish Keep Gate-crashing" – 3:05 / "A City Of Long Nights" (hidden track) – 7:02 (both songs: Strings arranged and conducted by Van Dyke Parks)
