= Kevin Johnson (singer) =

Australian singer-songwriter (born 1942)

- Born: Kevin Stephen Johnson; 3 July 1942 (age 84); Rockhampton, Queensland, Australia
- Genres: Rock; folk; country
- Occupation: Musician
- Instruments: Vocals, rhythm guitar
- Years active: 1960–2016
- Labels: Sweet Peach, Good Thyme, Festival/Infinity, J&B
- Website: rocknrolligaveyou.com

Kevin Stephen Johnson (born 3 July 1942) is an Australian singer-songwriter. Popular in the 1970s, his biggest hit is "Rock and Roll (I Gave You the Best Years of My Life)", which peaked at No. 4 on the Australian Kent Music Report Singles Chart in 1973 (as well as reaching the UK Top 40). He also had a top 20 hit with "Bonnie Please Don't Go" (aka "She's Leavin'") in 1971. "Rock and Roll" is one of the most covered songs written by an Australian with 27 different artists recording the song in 1975 alone. Covers of "Rock and Roll (I Gave You the Best Years of My Life)" came from fellow Australians, Col Joye and Dig Richards, and from international artists, Mac Davis, Terry Jacks, Gary Glitter, Joe Dassin (in French), The Cats and Tom Jones. Davis' rendition became the highest charting version on the Billboard Hot 100, reaching No. 15 in 1975.

== Early life ==
Kevin Stephen Johnson was born on and grew up in Tungamull, which is between the Capricorn Coast and Rockhampton, Queensland. He is the only son of Richard Johnson (timber contractor) and Elinor Johnson (post office, telephone exchange operator). Elinor was also a violinist and gave Johnson lessons but he showed little interest. He bought a guitar in his late teens and began his music career by singing in local beer gardens, then joining the Candymen on lead vocals and rhythm guitar. From the early 1960s he worked for the Queensland Department of Roads as a clerk; playing and singing at night and writing songs in his spare time. Some of his songs came to the notice of rock and roll artist, Col Joye, who signed Johnson to his publishing company. In September 1966 Col Joye and the Joy Boys had a hit with "Mary Anne", which had been written by Johnson.

== Career ==
=== 1967–1971: Career beginnings ===
In 1967 Johnson relocated to Sydney and recorded his first single, "Hayman Island" on Joye's ATA label in January. He followed with "Woman You Took My Life" in April 1968 but neither single had any chart success. Aside from his music career Johnson also worked for the Registrar-General's Department of New South Wales. "Woman You Took My Life" was later recorded by Tom Jones, and by Vince Hill. In 1969 Johnson signed with independent label, Sweet Peach. His debut album, In the Quiet Corners of My Mind, was released in that year. It was recorded at the Adelaide Studios of Gamba with Jimmy Stewart as producer and Stan Lewandowski as engineer. In February 1971 he issued his first hit single, "Bonnie Please Don't Go" aka "She's Leavin'", which peaked at No. 12 in Melbourne, No. 2 in Sydney, and No. 15 on the Go-Set National Top 60. It remained on the Go-Set charts for a total of 25 weeks; it was listed at No. 22 on their end of year chart; and No. 7 for Top Australian Singles of the year.

In 1971, Johnson won the Male Vocalist Single Award for his self-composed single, "Bonnie Please Don't Go".

=== 1972–1990: "Rock and Roll" and career peak ===
Kevin Johnson changed labels to the United States-based Tree International, owners of Dial Records, and for two years he wrote songs for other artists while vainly attempting to record his own material. He later recalled "Because I'd signed with an American company I couldn't record here ... two years writing and bashing my head against a brick wall". In September 1973 he issued "Rock and Roll I Gave You the Best Years of My Life". It peaked at No. 10 in Melbourne, and at No. 4 on the Australian Kent Music Report Singles Chart.

The lyrics describe a musician recalling his childhood dream of being a star and follows his life through his musical work, with some close breaks until he is faced with the ultimate realisation that he is not destined to become a star. It ends on an upbeat note from the would-be celebrity proclaiming "I thank the lord for giving me the little that I knew". Johnson based the early verses on his own life and the later verses "on others I've known. I always draw on things I know, things around me, on everyday life for my songs". He told Australasian Performing Right Association representative, Debbie Kruger, in March 2002, that he had written it in two days:

It was a quick song for me because I've spent months on one line. It just came to me one day as I was driving home, feeling all this frustration of two years without making a record. So I decided to write a song not about giving someone the best years of my life, but to write about the pursuit of success, which I thought related to a lot of people around the world, not just in music but anything".

— Kevin Johnson, March 2002.

He had become dissatisfied with his US record label, Dial Records, in Nashville, Tennessee and told them he was about to leave. However he was informed that other artists had already recorded his song, so he quickly recorded and released his own version on the Australian-based Good Thyme label through Festival. Kruger noted that "[the song] reflected his frustration with his own stagnation, and the futile attempts of Australian artists trying to break into America or England". In the US Johnson's single was issued on Mainstream Records, it went to No. 73 on the Billboard singles chart in 1973. It was picked up by producer Jonathan King and released in the United Kingdom on his UK Records label in 1974 when it reached No. 23 on the UK Singles Chart the following year. The song reached number 8 in the Irish charts on its original release in 1974, returning to number 18 under the UK Records release in January 1975.

At the 1974 Australian Radio Record Awards, "Rock And Roll (I Gave You the Best Years of My Life)," won the Male Vocalist Single award and his self-produced album under the same name was awarded the Male Vocalist Album.

According to rock music historian, Ian McFarlane, it is one of the most covered songs written by an Australian with 27 different artists recording it in 1975 alone. Covers include fellow Australians, Col Joye and Digby Richards, and international artists, Mac Davis, Terry Jacks, Gary Glitter, Joe Dassin (in French), The Cats and Tom Jones. Some cover artists, including Davis, leave out the lyric "... I'd never be a star" for a happier ending. Johnson believes "There were a few people who wouldn't sing [that line] because in their minds they were big stars". Others, like Glitter, leave out the upbeat ending in the Johnson version for a more sombre ending. Jacks' version went to No. 97 in the US in 1974 – it reached No. 22 in Canada – and Davis' rendition became the highest US charting version, reaching No. 15 in 1975.

In February 1974 Kevin Johnson issued his second solo album, Rock and Roll I Gave You the Best Years of My Life, on the Good Thyme label. In the next year he supported an Australian tour by Roberta Flack. He released a succession of singles on the label and followed in August 1976 with a third album, Man of the 20th Century. For that album he used session musicians including Russell Dunlop on drums; Wayne Findlay on keyboards; Jim Kelly, Kirk Lorange, Mark Punch, and Rory O'Donoghue on guitars; and Tim Partridge on bass guitar. Later that year he toured Europe and appeared on a TV special broadcast into France, Italy, Germany and Switzerland. His single, "Grab the Money and Run", appeared on the Irish charts.

Johnson toured Europe again in 1977. He also signed with Festival Records' offshoot Infinity to issue further singles and an album, Journeys, which was released in 1978. Additional albums followed including Best of Kevin Johnson (a compilation album, 1979), Night Rider (1981), Spirit of the Times (1985), Now and Then (compilation, 1992) and The Sun will Shine Again (September 1996).

In 1996 Johnson re-wrote "Rock 'N' Roll" for the Australian Football League (AFL) as their official Centenary Song, retitled "Aussie Rules I Thank You for the Best Years of Our Lives". It was used as an introductory theme before AFL games during that season. During the late 1990s it was used as the closing theme for Foster's Aussie Rules, a US highlights show.

=== 2000s: JAM ===
Kevin Johnson formed a trio, JAM (initialism for Johnson Ashdown McClellan) with Doug Ashdown ("Winter in America" aka "Leave Love Enough Alone") and Mike McClellan ("Song and Dance Man"). They toured Australia through the 2000s.

== Personal life ==
In 1967 Kevin Johnson married Jill and by April 1975 the couple had two children Shane and Scott.

== Discography ==
=== Studio albums ===
List of albums, with selected chart positions
Title	Album details	Peak chart positions
Title	Album details	AUS
In the Quiet Corners of My Mind	Released: 1969; Format: LP; Label: Sweet Peach (SPL 101)	-
Rock and Roll I Gave You the Best Years of My Life	Released: February 1974; Format: LP; Label: Good Thyme (GTRLP 001)	21
A Man of the 20th Century	Released: August 1976; Format: LP; Label: Good Thyme (L 35935)	35
Journeys	Released: November 1978; Format: LP, Cassette; Label: Infinity (L 36701)	92
Night Rider	Released: April 1981; Format: LP, Cassette; Label: Infinity (L 37530)	72
In the Spirit of the Times	Released: 1985; Format: LP, CD, Cassette; Label: Infinity (L 38299)	–
In the Spirit of the Times	Released: 1985; Format: LP; Label: Infinity (L 38299)	–
The Sun Will Shine Again	Released: 1996; Format: CD, Cassette; Label: Festival Records (D 31652)	–
Songs from a Troubled World	Released: 2006; Format: CD, Digital download; Label: KJE (KJE 1021)	–
The Devil Found Work	Released: 2019; Format: CD, Digital download; Label: Lassiandra Records (LASS001)	–

=== Australian Compilation albums ===
List of albums, with selected chart positions
Title	Album details	Peak chart positions
Title	Album details	AUS
The Best of Kevin Johnson	Released: November 1979; Format: LP; Label: Infinity (L 36945)	100
A Hard Act to Follow (with Paul O'Gorman)	Released: 1987; Format: LP; Label: BBC Radioplay Music (TAIR87055); Note: Co-credited compilation	–
Now and Then	Released: 1992; Format: CD; Label: J&B Records (JB481CD)	–
The Ultimate Collection	Released: February 2015; Format: 2xCD, Digital download; Label: Fanfare Records (FANFARE152)	–
The Classics	Released: 1 April 2022; Format: CD, digital, LP; Label: Possum Records	–

=== Singles ===
Title	Year	Chart peak positions			Album
Title	Year	AUS	GER	UK	Album
"Hayman Island"	1967	–	–	–	non album singles
"Woman You Took My Life"	1968	–	–	–	non album singles
"It Was Good While It Lasted"	1970	–	–	–	In the Quiet Corners of My Mind
"Bonnie Please Don't Go (She's Leaving)"	1971	15	–	–	Rock & Roll (I Gave You the Best Years of My Life)
"All Our Favourite Songs"	1971	96	–	–	non album single
"Rock 'N' Roll (I Gave You the Best Years of My Life)"	1973	4	47	23	Rock & Roll (I Gave You the Best Years of My Life)
"Kedron Brook"	1974	92	–	–	Rock & Roll (I Gave You the Best Years of My Life)
"Man of the 20th Century"	1975	–	–	–	A Man of the 20th Century
"Someday Sam"	1975	–	–	–	A Man of the 20th Century
"Over the Hills and Far Away"	1976	60	–	–	A Man of the 20th Century
"Grab the Money and Run"	1976	–	–	–	A Man of the 20th Century
"All I Ever Needed"	1977	–	–	–	
"Next Plane to New Mexico"	1979	–	–	–	Journeys
"Paraguayan Sunset"	1979	–	–	–	Journeys
"Shaney Boy"	1979	–	–	–	The Best of Kevin Johnson
"He Was Just a Boy"	1980	–	–	–	Night Rider
"Night Rider"	1981	–	–	–	Night Rider
"Reasons"	1982	98	–	–	Night Rider
"Hard Act to Follow"	1984	–	–	–	In The Spirit of the Times
"Night Comes"	1985	–	–	–	In The Spirit of the Times

== Awards ==
=== Australian Radio Records Awards ===
Year	Nominee / work	Award	Result
1974	Rock 'N' Roll (I Gave You the Best Years of My Life)	Album	Won
1974	"Rock 'N' Roll (I Gave You the Best Years of My Life)"	Single	Won
