= Seasons in the Sun (album) =

Studio album by Terry Jacks
- Released: 1974
- Studio: Can-Base, Vancouver
- Genre: Folk rock; soft rock; pop rock
- Length: 29:14
- Label: Bell / Goldfish (Canada)
- Producer: Terry Jacks

Terry Jacks chronology
Seasons in the Sun (1974)	Y' Don't Fight the Sea (1975)

Professional ratings
Review scores
Source	Rating
AllMusic	3/5 stars

Seasons in the Sun is the debut studio album by Canadian musician Terry Jacks, released in 1974 by Bell Records. It features Jacks' biggest hit song, "Seasons in the Sun", which reached No. 1 in over 10 countries.

== Track listing ==
Side one
No.	Title	Writer(s)	Length
1.	"Concrete Sea"	Terry Jacks	2:20
2.	"I'm Gonna Love You Too"	Joe Mauldin, Niki Sullivan, Norman Petty	2:40
3.	"Pumpkin Eater"	Craig Wood	2:45
4.	"Again and Again"	Jacks	2:35
5.	"Since You Broke My Heart"	Don Everly	2:27
6.	"Fire on the Skyline"	Franklin Wesley	3:05

Side two
No.	Title	Writer(s)	Length
7.	"The Love Game"	Jacks	2:16
8.	"I'm So Lonely Here Today"	Jacks	2:22
9.	"It's Been There from the Start"	Harold Overstreet	2:16
10.	"Sail Away"	Wood	3:00
11.	"Seasons in the Sun"	Jacques Brel, Rod McKuen	3:28

Bonus tracks
No.	Title	Length
12.	"Put the Bone In"	1:54
13.	"If You Go Away"	2:30
14.	"Me and You"	2:08
15.	"Rock and Roll (I Gave You the Best Years of My Life)"	3:46

== Charts ==
Chart performance for Seasons in the Sun
Chart (1974)	Peak position
Australian Albums (Kent Music Report)	58
