= Seasons in the Sun =

English-language adaptation of the song "Le Moribond"

- German 7" vinyl cover

Single by Terry Jacks

from the album Seasons in the Sun
- B-side: "Put the Bone In"
- Released: November 1973
- Recorded: 1973
- Genre: Pop; soft rock
- Length: 3:24
- Label: Bell
- Songwriters: Jacques Brel, Rod McKuen
- Producer: Terry Jacks

Terry Jacks singles chronology
"Concrete Sea" (1972)	"Seasons in the Sun" (1973)	"If You Go Away" (1974)

Audio video
- "Seasons in the Sun" on YouTube

"Le Moribond"
- 7" vinyl single cover

Song by Jacques Brel

from the album Marieke
- Released: July 1961
- Recorded: 22 February 1961
- Genre: Chanson
- Length: 3:06
- Label: Philips
- Songwriter: Jacques Brel

"Seasons in the Sun" is an English-language adaptation of the 1961 Belgian song "Le Moribond" ("The Dying Man") by singer-songwriter Jacques Brel, with lyrics rewritten in 1963 by American singer-poet Rod McKuen, expressing a dying man's farewell to his loved ones, which peaked at Number 20 in the Wallonian (French Belgium) charts that September. "Seasons in the Sun" became a worldwide hit in 1974 for Canadian singer Terry Jacks and reached Christmas number one in the UK in 1999 for Irish boy band Westlife.

== Background and lyrics ==
The first version of the song was recorded by Brel. Set to a marching rhythm, it tells the story of a man dying, as he bids farewell first to his close friend Emile, then to a priest, followed by an acquaintance named Antoine, and finally to his wife, who has cheated on him numerous times with Antoine. Despite being aware of Antoine's role as his wife's lover, he wishes him no ill and instead asks him to take care of her. American Rod McKuen translated the lyrics into English. In 1964, the Kingston Trio became the first to record an English version of "Seasons in the Sun", which was later heard by Terry Jacks and served as the foundation for his rendition.

Jacks altered nearly one-sixth of McKuen's lyrics, later claiming that all of the words were his own. He considered the original version and its translations to be "too macabre". The inspiration for the rewritten lyrics came from his close friend Roger, who was suffering from acute leukemia and died four months later. Jacks's rendition, later dedicated to his friend, features the dying man (in the spring season) delivering his last words to his loved ones with whom he shared his life, echoing the themes of the original. However, unlike Brel's version, the man does not die heartbroken; instead, he reflects on the rights and wrongs of his actions in life as he passes away peacefully.

In the rewritten version, the man first addresses a close friend he has known since childhood, reminiscing about the happy times they shared, such as playing and studying together ("climbed hills and trees", "learned of love and ABC's") and their friendships with others ("skinned our hearts and skinned our knees"). He then turns to his father ("Papa"), who endeavored to provide him with a good upbringing and exert a positive influence on his undisciplined life ("I was the black sheep of the family," "You tried to teach me right from wrong," "wonder how I got along"), which included overindulgence, vices, and revelry ("too much wine and too much song"). Finally, the man addresses a "little one" named "Michelle" (possibly a daughter or young lover), recounting how she had lifted his spirits during times of despair. At the end of each verse, he reassures all three that he is always present in spirit when they visit familiar places or encounter certain people.

== Recording ==
According to Jacks, the Beach Boys asked him to be their producer during the sessions for the band's album Surf's Up. On 31 July 1970, they attempted a rendition of "Seasons in the Sun", but the session did not go well, and the track was never completed. Later, Mike Love told an interviewer: "We did record a version [of 'Seasons'] but it was so wimpy we had to throw it out. ... It was just the wrong song for us." The recording remained unreleased until the 2021 compilation Feel Flows.

Jacks recorded his rendition in Vancouver in 1973. Who exactly played the piano arpeggio and double bass parts in the third verse is unclear; Jacks has said that David Foster played these on the recording, but David Lanz insists that he contributed these parts.

== Release ==
Jacks released his version as a single in 1973 under his own label, Goldfish Records. The B-side featured "Put the Bone In", an original composition about burying a deceased pet dog. The single quickly topped the record charts in the US (where it was released on Bell Records), Canada, and the UK, selling over 14 million copies worldwide.

Jacks's version of "Seasons in the Sun" was released in the United States in December 1973 and entered the Billboard Hot 100 a month later. On 2 March 1974, the song began a three-week run at number one atop the Hot 100 and remained in the top 40 until nearly Memorial Day weekend. Jacks's version also spent one week on the Easy Listening charts. Billboard ranked it the number-two song for 1974. Although Jacks released several other singles that were moderately successful in Canada, "Seasons in the Sun" would remain his only major solo hit in the United States. In Canada, the single (released under Gold Fish catalog number GF 100) reached number one on the RPM magazine charts on 26 January 1974, where it remained for four weeks. It was in the top 40 there for 17 weeks, 13 of which were in the top 10.

Though the song enjoyed contemporary success, some modern critics take a dimmer view, considering it an overly sentimental sanitized version of the original song. Jacks's version has been cited as an example of bad music, having been listed as one of the worst pop songs ever recorded and ranking number five in a similar CNN poll in 2006.

Jacks also released a German-language version in Germany with lyrics by Gerd Müller-Schwanke, titled "In den Gärten der Zeit" ("In the Gardens of Time").

== Charts ==
Weekly charts

Terry Jacks version
Chart (1973–1974)	Peak position
Australia (Kent Music Report)	1
Austria (Ö3 Austria Top 40)	1
Belgium (Ultratop 50 Flanders)	2
Belgium (Ultratop 50 Wallonia)	1
Canada Top 100 (RPM)	1
Canada Top 100 AC (RPM)	1
Denmark	1
Finland (Suomen virallinen lista)	1
France	1
Ireland (IRMA)	1
Netherlands (Dutch Top 40)	6
Netherlands (Single Top 100)	7
New Zealand (Listener)	1
Norway (VG-lista)	1
Portugal (AFP)	4
South Africa (Springbok)	1
Sweden (Sverigetopplistan)	1
Switzerland (Schweizer Hitparade)	1
UK Singles (Official Charts)	1
US Billboard Hot 100	1
US Adult Contemporary (Billboard)	1
US Cash Box Top 100	1
West Germany (GfK)	1
Zimbabwe (ZIMA)	1

Year-end charts

Terry Jacks version
Chart (1974)	Rank
Australia (Kent Music Report)	5
Canada Top Singles (RPM)	1
Denmark	5
Netherlands (Dutch Top 40)	28
Netherlands (Single Top 100)	40
South Africa (Springbok)	6
Switzerland (Schweizer Hitparade)	1
UK Singles	5
US Billboard Hot 100	2
US Cash Box Pop Singles	9

== Certifications and sales ==
Region	Certification	Certified units/sales
Canada	—	312,000
France	—	300,000
United Kingdom (BPI)	Gold	500,000^{^}
United States (RIAA)	Gold	3,000,000
Summaries
Worldwide	—	8,000,000
^{^} Shipments figures based on certification alone.

== Westlife version ==
"Seasons in the Sun"

Single by Westlife

from the album Westlife
- A-side: "I Have a Dream"; (double A-side); "Flying Without Wings"; (triple A-side, Australia)
- Released: 13 December 1999
- Studio: PWL Studios (London)
- Length: 4:06
- Label: BMG
- Songwriters: Jacques Brel; Rod McKuen
- Producer: TTW

Westlife singles chronology
"Flying Without Wings" (1999)	"I Have a Dream" / "Seasons in the Sun" (1999)	"Fool Again" (2000)

Music video
- "Seasons in the Sun" on YouTube

Irish boy band Westlife released a cover of "Seasons in the Sun" in December 1999, as a double A-side with "I Have a Dream" and as a triple A-side in Australia, including both "I Have a Dream" and "Flying Without Wings" in a very limited release. The release became the UK's Christmas number-one single of 1999 – outperforming Cliff Richard's charity single "The Millennium Prayer", which landed at No. 2 – and marked the group's fourth UK number-one single. It continued to maintain its position into January 2000, spending a total of 17 weeks on the UK chart. The song was the 26th-best-selling single of 1999 in the UK.

"Seasons in the Sun" has 100,273 sales from streaming as a standalone track as of 9 December 2021.

=== Track listings ===
- United Kingdom & Ireland
1. "I Have a Dream" (Single Remix) – 4:06
2. "Seasons in the Sun" (Single Remix) – 4:10
3. "On the Wings of Love" – 3:22
- Australia
1. "Flying Without Wings" - 3:35
2. "I Have a Dream" (Remix) - 4:06
3. "Seasons in the Sun" (Single Remix) - 4:10
4. "Flying Without Wings" (Video) - 3:40

=== Charts ===
==== Weekly charts ====
Chart (1999–2000)	Peak position
Czech Republic (IFPI)	25
Europe (Eurochart Hot 100)	7
Finland (Suomen virallinen lista)	10
Germany (GfK)	24
Iceland (Íslenski Listinn Topp 40)	13
Ireland (IRMA)	1
New Zealand (Recorded Music NZ)	10
Norway (VG-lista)	10
Scottish Singles Sales (Official Charts)	1
Spain Airplay (Top 40 Radio)	30
Sweden (Sverigetopplistan)	15
Switzerland (Schweizer Hitparade)	18
UK Singles (Official Charts)	1

==== Year-end charts ====
Chart (1999)	Position
UK Singles (OCC)	26

Chart (2000)	Position
Europe (Eurochart Hot 100)	71
Ireland (IRMA)	45
UK Singles (OCC)	106

== Other notable versions ==
- The first recording of the English-language version (lyrics by McKuen) was released on the 1963 album Time to Think by the Kingston Trio, which was released as a single the following year but failed to chart.
- English band The Fortunes released a version of the song as a single in November 1968, which peaked at Number 4 in the Netherlands in May 1969.
- The Beach Boys recorded a version of the song in 1971, which remained unreleased until the 2021 box set Feel Flows was released.
- A cover version by Bobby Wright reached No. 24 on the Billboard Hot Country Singles chart in 1974. In Canada it started at #73 on March 2, but the chart was shortened to Top 50 the next week and it did not make the cut.
- The grunge band Nirvana recorded a version in 1993.

== See also ==
- List of 1970s one-hit wonders in the United States
