= The Irish Keep Gate-crashing =

2005 single by the Thrills

Single by the Thrills

from the album Let's Bottle Bohemia
- B-side: "Not for All the Love in the World" (acoustic); "Viva Las Vegas" (live)
- Released: 21 March 2005
- Length: 3:09
- Label: Virgin
- Songwriters: Ben Carrigan, Conor Deasy, Kevin Horan, Padraic McMahon, Daniel Ryan
- Producer: Dave Sardy

The Thrills singles chronology
| "Not for All the Love in the World" (2004) | "The Irish Keep Gate-crashing" (2005) | "Nothing Changes Around Here" (2007) |

"The Irish Keep Gate-crashing" is the third and final single from the album Let's Bottle Bohemia by Irish alternative rock band the Thrills. It was released on 21 March 2005 and reached number 48 on the UK Singles Chart.

== Track listings ==
All tracks are written by the Thrills.

iTunes digital download
| No. | Title | Length |
|---|---|---|
| 1. | "The Irish Keep Gate-crashing" | 3:09 |

CD Single
| No. | Title | Length |
|---|---|---|
| 1. | "The Irish Keep Gate-crashing" | 3:10 |
| 2. | "Viva Las Vegas" (live, feat. James Burton) | 3:13 |

CD maxi, 7-inch vinyl
| No. | Title | Length |
|---|---|---|
| 1. | "The Irish Keep Gate-crashing" | 3:10 |
| 2. | "Not for All the Love in the World" (acoustic) | 3:51 |
| 3. | "Viva Las Vegas" (live, feat. James Burton) | 3:10 |

DVD
| No. | Title | Length |
|---|---|---|
| 1. | "The Irish Keep Gate-Crashing - Video" |
| 2. | "Movie Premieres" |
| 3. | "The Making of So Much for the City: A Film About the Thrills by the Thrills" |

== Charts ==
| Chart (2005) | Peak position |
|---|---|
| UK Singles (OCC) | 48 |
