= Ted Dushinski =

Canadian football player (1943–2005)

Profile
- Position: Defensive back

Personal information
- Born: November 10, 1943; Ituna, Saskatchewan, Canada
- Died: October 24, 2005 (aged 61); Vancouver, British Columbia, Canada
- Listed height: 6 ft 0 in (1.83 m)
- Listed weight: 190 lb (86 kg)

Career information
- CJFL: Saskatoon Hilltops

Career history
- 1965–1975: Saskatchewan Roughriders
- 1976–1977: BC Lions

Awards and highlights
- Grey Cup champion (1966); 2× CFL West All-Star (1970, 1975); Saskatchewan Roughrider Hall of Fame

Ted J. Dushinski (November 10, 1943 – October 24, 2005) was a former defensive back for the Saskatchewan Roughriders of the Canadian Football League (CFL).

== Early days ==
Ted Dushinski was born in Ituna, Saskatchewan in 1943. Dushinski loved hockey when younger, playing junior hockey with the Saskatoon Quakers as a young boy. He continued playing senior hockey during the off-season even after joining a pro football team, only stopping when football coach Eagle Keys requested it in case of injury.

Dushinski played junior football with the Saskatoon Hilltops before joining the Saskatchewan Roughriders in 1965.

== CFL ==
Dushinski played eleven seasons with the team, helping them to victory in their first ever Grey Cup win in 1966 over the Ottawa Rough Riders by a score of 29-14. He also played in the 55th Grey Cup of 1967 and the 57th Grey Cup of 1969, losses to the Hamilton Tiger-Cats and Ottawa, respectively. Dushinski was elected to the All Star Team in 1972. Leaving the Saskatchewan team after eleven seasons, he joined the BC Lions from 1976 to 1979

== Post-football ==
He decided to retire after the 1977 season for business and family reasons, stating in a 1978 interview with the Saskatoon StarPhoenix that he wanted to "sever my relationships with football with good feelings [...] the game has treated me well and I decided to walk away from it gracefully."

He was married to singer/songwriter Susan Jacks (née Pesklevits). Ted and Susan had one son named Thad. In 1983, they moved to Nashville, Tennessee and were living in Antioch before Ted's death.

== Honors ==
Dushinski was enshrined into the Saskatchewan Roughrider Hall of Fame in 1993.

== Death ==
He died of lung cancer in 2005, at the age of 61.

== Videos ==
Seen in game 3 of the 1970 Western Conference finals in its entirety on YouTube
