= The Midnight Choir =

Single by The Thrills

from the album Teenager
- Released: 29 October 2007
- Genre: Alternative rock
- Length: 3:42
- Label: Virgin

The Thrills singles chronology
"Nothing Changes Around Here" (2007)	"The Midnight Choir" (2007)

"The Midnight Choir" is the second single taken from The Thrills' third album, Teenager. It was released on 29 October 2007, as a download-only single and did not chart in the UK Singles Chart.

Reviewer Lisa Verrico described it as "rousing", though characterized the album as "a collection of top-tapping tunes [which] fail to nail any edge."

The single was originally planned to be released on two 7" vinyl records (each with different artwork and B-sides) as well as on CD with a third new song. Seemingly at the last minute the physical formats were pulled and the song was released only as a download. One of the B-sides, "Mystery," was sent as a free download to members of the Thrills mailing list. The other B-sides, entitled "To Be A Spectacular Failure" (from the CD release) and "You're So Easy On Yourself," have not been released.

== Track listing ==
All tracks are written by The Thrills.

Digital Download
No.	Title	Length
1.	"The Midnight Choir"	3:42
2.	"Mystery" (Free Download)	3:18

Promo CD
No.	Title	Length
1.	"The Midnight Choir" (Radio Edit)
2.	"The Midnight Choir" (Instrumental)
