= Which Way You Goin' Billy? (album) =

Studio album by The Poppy Family
- Released: 1969 / 1970 (US)
- Genre: Psychedelic pop
- Label: London
- Producer: Terry Jacks

The Poppy Family chronology
Which Way You Goin' Billy? (1969)	Poppy Seeds (1971)

1970 "Which Way You Goin' Billy" 45 rpm single release dust cover. Note the "B" side, Endless Sleep, which was unreleased on either of the group's albums.

Which Way You Goin' Billy?, released in 1969, was the first album from Vancouver, British Columbia band The Poppy Family.

They scored their biggest hit with title track, "Which Way You Goin' Billy?", which went to #1 in both Canada and Ireland and #2 on both the Billboard Hot 100 chart and the Cash Box Top 100 in the US in mid-1970. The album has been reissued on CD with the second album included as bonus tracks, however the original vinyl remains rare and collectable.

Their songs "What Can the Matter Be?" and "Of Cities and Escapes" were prominently sampled in the songs "Things You Can Do" and "Madness" by hip-hop group Deltron 3030 on their self-titled debut album, respectively.

== Track listing ==
Words and music by Terry Jacks.

=== Side 1 ===
1. "That's Where I Went Wrong" – 2:28
2. "Free From the City" – 2:15
3. "Beyond the Clouds" – 2:30
4. "A Good Thing Lost" – 2:00
5. "You Took My Moonlight Away" – 2:40
6. "There's No Blood in Bone" – 2:55

=== Side 2 ===
1. "Happy Island" – 2:45
2. "Which Way You Goin' Billy?" - 3:18
3. "Shadows on My Wall" - 2:25
4. "What Can the Matter Be?" - 2:17
5. "For Running Wild" - 2:14
6. "Of Cities and Escapes" - 3:45

== Personnel ==
- Susan Jacks: vocals, percussion
- Terry Jacks: vocals, guitar
- Craig McCaw: guitar, sitar
- Satwant Singh: drums, tablas, bongos, percussion
