= Rock and Roll (I Gave You the Best Years of My Life) =

1973 single by Kevin Johnson

Single by Kevin Johnson

from the album Rock 'N' Roll I Gave You the Best Years of My Life
- B-side: "Mohair Sam" (Australia) "There's Nothing I'd Rather Do" (U.S.)
- Released: November 1973
- Recorded: 1973
- Genre: Soft rock
- Length: 5:20
- Label: Nova, Good Thyme, Mainstream
- Songwriter: Kevin Johnson
- Producer: Kevin Johnson

Kevin Johnson singles chronology
"All Our Favourite Songs" (1971)	"Rock and Roll (I Gave You the Best Years of My Life)" (1973)	"Kedron Brook" (1974)

Official audio
- "Rock and Roll (I Gave You the Best Years of My Life)" on YouTube

"Rock 'N' Roll (I Gave You the Best Years of My Life)"

Single by Mac Davis

from the album All the Love in the World
- B-side: "Emily Suzanne"
- Released: December 1974
- Length: 3:25
- Label: Columbia
- Songwriter: Kevin Johnson
- Producer: Gary Klein

Mac Davis singles chronology
"Stop and Smell the Roses" (1974)	"Rock 'N' Roll (I Gave You the Best Years of My Life)" (1974)	"(If You Add) All the Love in the World" (1975)

"Rock and Roll (I Gave You the Best Years of My Life)"

Single by Terry Jacks

from the album Y' Don't Fight the Sea
- B-side: "The Love Game"
- Released: 1975
- Length: 3:39
- Label: Bell / Goldfish
- Songwriter: Kevin Johnson
- Producer: Terry Jacks

Terry Jacks singles chronology
"If You Go Away" (1974)	"Rock and Roll (I Gave You the Best Years of My Life)" (1975)	""Christina"" (1975)

"Rock and Roll (I Gave You the Best Years of My Life)" is a 1973 song written and originally performed by Australian singer Kevin Johnson, most famously covered by American singer Mac Davis.

Johnson's version reached number four in Australia. The guitar solo in Johnson's version was played by Rory O'Donoghue. In Australia, Ireland and the United Kingdom, only Johnson's original version charted.

== Mac Davis version ==
In the United States, it was Mac Davis who had the primary hit version in 1974, although three versions of the song became American chart hits. His version reached #15 on the Billboard Hot 100. "Rock 'N' Roll" is the first track on his sixth studio album All the Love in the World. The song was the lead single of two issued from the LP, the other being the title track, and both of which became hit records.

== The Cats version ==
Dutch band the Cats released a version in the Netherlands in 1973 on EMI Nederland. The song reached #3 on both the Single Top 100 and Dutch Top 40.

== Terry Jacks version ==
In Canada, Terry Jacks' version made the charts in 1975. It also reached number 97 on the Billboard Hot 100. His version appeared on the album Y' Don't Fight the Sea and was a bonus track appearing on Seasons in the Sun.

== Other notable versions ==
New Zealand singer Craig Scott covered the song in 1974, reaching #13 there.

== Charts ==
=== Weekly charts ===
Kevin Johnson original

Chart (1973–1974)	Peak position
Australia (Go-Set)	4
Ireland (IRMA)	8
UK Singles Chart (Official Charts Company)	23
US Billboard Hot 100	73
US Adult Contemporary (Billboard)	43
US Cash Box Top 100	90
West Germany	47

Chart (1975)	Peak position
Ireland (IRMA)	18

The Cats cover

Chart (1973–1974)	Peak position
Belgium Flanders Top 30	15
Netherlands Single Top 100	3
Netherlands Dutch Top 40	3

Craig Scott cover

Chart (1974)	Peak position
New Zealand	13

Terry Jacks cover

Chart (1974–1975)	Peak position
Canada Top Singles (RPM)	22
Canada Adult Contemporary (RPM)	5
US Billboard Hot 100	97
US Cash Box Top 100	92

=== Year-end charts ===
Chart (1975)	Rank
Canada Top Singles (RPM)	182

Mac Davis cover

Chart (1974–1975)	Peak position
Canada Top Singles (RPM)	40
Canada Adult Contemporary (RPM)	14
US Billboard Hot 100	15
US Easy Listening (Billboard)	4
US Hot Country Singles (Billboard)	29
US Cash Box Top 100	16

Chart (1975)	Rank
US (Joel Whitburn's Pop Annual)	143
