= Stop and Smell the Roses (Mac Davis album) =

Studio album by Mac Davis
- Released: 1974
- Studio: FAME Studios, Muscle Shoals, Alabama
- Genre: Country, pop
- Length: 30:03
- Label: Columbia
- Producer: Rick Hall; Gary Klein on "Stop and Smell the Roses"

Mac Davis chronology
Mac Davis (1973)	Stop and Smell the Roses (1974)	All the Love in the World (1974)

Stop and Smell the Roses is a 1974 album by Mac Davis. It peaked at No. 2 on the US country albums chart and No. 13 on the overall albums chart.

== Track list ==
All tracks written by Mac Davis, with additional writers noted.

No.	Title	Writer(s)	Length
1.	"Stop and Smell the Roses"	Doc Severinsen	2:55
2.	"Soft, Sweet Fire"	Mark James	2:58
3.	"The Sweetest Song"	James	3:08
4.	"Two Plus Two"	James	2:45
5.	"The Birthday Song"		2:27
6.	"One Hell of a Woman"	James	2:53
7.	"A Poor Man's Gold"		3:28
8.	"Lucas Was a Redneck"		2:47
9.	"Kiss It and Make It Better"		3:00
10.	"Good Friends and Fireplaces"		3:42

== Charts ==
Chart (1974)	Peak position
US Top LPs & Tape (Billboard)	13
US Top Country LP's (Billboard)	2
Australia (Kent Music Report)	60

== Personnel ==
- Mac Davis - lead vocals, acoustic guitar, harmonica
- Ken Ball, Travis Wammack - guitar
- Leo LeBlanc - steel guitar
- Jerry Bridges - bass guitar
- Tim Henson - keyboards, tambourine
- Roger Clark - drums
- Dale Anderson, Victor Feldman - vibraphone
- Eddy Manson, Tommy Morgan - harmonica
- The Ron Hicklin Singers - background vocals
- Sid Sharp Strings - strings
- Jimmie Haskell - string arrangements

Technical

- Gary Klein - producer on "Stop and Smell the Roses"
- Al Cartee, Larry Hamby, Rick Hall - engineer
- Ed Caraeff - cover photography
