= Not for All the Love in the World =

2004 single by The Thrills

Single by The Thrills

from the album Let's Bottle Bohemia
- B-side: "What a Cruel Trick to Play Upon Myself"
- Released: 15 November 2004
- Genre: Alternative rock
- Length: 3:37
- Label: Virgin Records
- Songwriters: Ben Carrigan, Conor Deasy, Kevin Horan, Padraic McMahon, Daniel Ryan
- Producer: Dave Sardy

The Thrills singles chronology
"Whatever Happened to Corey Haim?" (2004)	"Not for All the Love in the World" (2004)	"The Irish Keep Gate-crashing" (2005)

"Not for All the Love in the World" is the second single from the album Let's Bottle Bohemia by Irish Alternative Rock band The Thrills. It was released on 15 November 2004. The single marked a significant change in the band's direction as a slower, more melancholic release. The song reached number 38 on the Irish Singles Chart and number 39 on the UK Singles Chart. It was also one of two Thrills songs to chart on the US Billboard Adult Alternative Songs chart, peaking at number 15 in September 2004, a month and a half before its European release.

== Track listing ==
All tracks are written by The Thrills.

CD Single
No.	Title	Length
1.	"Not for All the Love in the World" (Radio Edit)	3:37
2.	"What a Cruel Trick to Play Upon Myself"	2:25

CD Maxi Single
No.	Title	Length
1.	"Not for All the Love in the World" (Radio Edit)
2.	"This Guy's in Love with You" (Ken Bruce Session)
3.	"Not for All the Love in the World" (Sebastien Tellier Remix)
4.	"Not for All the Love in the World" (Video)

iTunes Digital Download
No.	Title	Length
1.	"Not for All the Love in the World"	4:10

== Charts ==
Chart (2004)	Peak position
Ireland (IRMA)	38
Scottish Singles Sales (Official Charts)	43
UK Singles (Official Charts)	39
US Adult Alternative Airplay (Billboard)	15
