= Nothing Changes Around Here =

Single by The Thrills

from the album Teenager
- B-side: "That Boy"; "Second Guessing"; "Some Other Day"
- Released: 16 July 2007
- Genre: Alternative rock
- Length: 3:44
- Label: Virgin
- Producer(s): Tony Hoffer

The Thrills singles chronology
"The Irish Keep Gate-crashing" (2005)	"Nothing Changes Around Here" (2007)	"The Midnight Choir" (2007)

Alternative Cover
- Blue 7" Vinyl edition

"Nothing Changes Around Here" is the first single taken from The Thrills' third album Teenager. The band sang the track live on the RTÉ One television show "Saturday Night With Miriam" on Saturday 14 July 2007.

The single reached number 40 in the UK Singles Chart, becoming their sixth UK top 40 hit.

== Track listing ==
All tracks are written by The Thrills.

CD Single
No.	Title	Length
1.	"Nothing Changes Around Here" (Radio Edit)	3:44
2.	"That Boy"	3:07

Digital Download
No.	Title	Length
1.	"Nothing Changes Around Here" (Acoustic Version)	4:19

Digital Download
No.	Title	Length
1.	"Nothing Changes Around Here" (Demo Version)	3:31

7" Posterfold (Rose Heavyweight Vinyl)
No.	Title	Length
1.	"Nothing Changes Around Here" (Radio Edit)	3:44
2.	"Second Guessing"	3:08

7" Gatefold (Blue Heavyweight Vinyl)
No.	Title	Length
1.	"Nothing Changes Around Here" (Album Version)	4:12
2.	"Some Other Day"	2:46

== Charts ==
Chart (2007)	Peak position
UK Singles (OCC)	40
