= One Hell of a Woman =

Single by Mac Davis

from the album Stop and Smell the Roses
- B-side: "A Poor Man's Gold"
- Released: March 1974
- Genre: Easy listening
- Length: 2:57
- Label: Columbia
- Songwriters: Mac Davis, Mark James
- Producer: Rick Hall

Mac Davis singles chronology
"Kiss and Make It Better" (1973)	"One Hell of a Woman" (1974)	"Stop and Smell the Roses" (1974)

"One Hell of a Woman" is a 1974 song (see 1974 in music) by the American singer-songwriter Mac Davis. The song was written by Davis and Mark James.

Released as a single from his album Stop and Smell the Roses, the song became Davis' second Top 20 hit on the U.S. pop chart, where it peaked at No. 11 in the fall of 1974. The song remained in the Top 40 for ten weeks. It spent a total of 28 weeks on the national charts, 10 weeks longer than did his number-one hit, "Baby, Don't Get Hooked on Me." Unusually for Davis, the song did not chart on the American country charts. While the song peaked at number 11, it spent so many weeks on the charts that on the "Billboard Year-End Hot 100 singles of 1974," it was the tenth most successful song of the year.

In the lyrics, the singer praises a woman, later revealed to be his wife. He describes her as a "free and gentle spirit." While he calls her "one hell of a woman," being with her makes him "feel like a hell of a man."

== Chart performance ==
=== Weekly charts ===
Chart (1974)	Peak position
U.S. Billboard Hot 100	11
U.S. Billboard Easy Listening	20
Canadian RPM Top Singles	11
Canadian RPM Adult Contemporary	39
Canadian RPM Country Tracks	42

=== Year-end charts ===
Chart (1974)	Rank
Canada	119
U.S. Billboard Hot 100	10
