= The Thrills =

Irish pop band

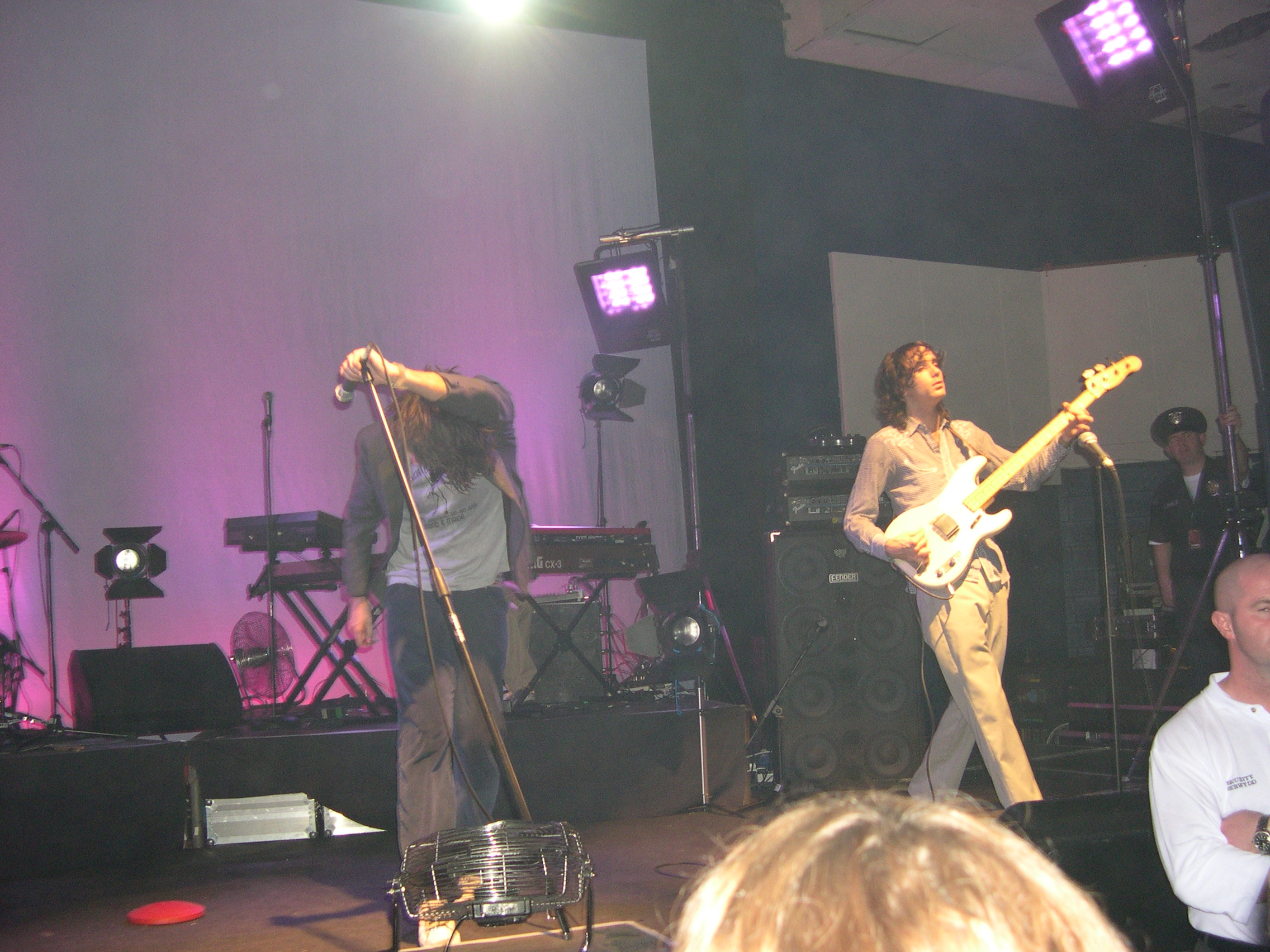
- The Thrills

Background information
- Origin: Dublin, Ireland
- Genres: Indie pop, pop rock, indie rock
- Years active: 2001–2010, 2026-present
- Label: Virgin Records
- Members: Conor Deasy; Daniel Ryan; Padraic McMahon; Kevin Horan; Ben Carrigan
- Website: thethrills.com

The Thrills are an Irish rock band originally formed in Dublin, Ireland in 2001. The band was founded by lead vocalist Conor Deasy and guitarist Daniel Ryan, guitarist and bass player Padraic McMahon, pianist Kevin Horan and drummer Ben Carrigan. Their break came with their debut album, So Much for the City, which became an Irish number one and charted at number 3 in the UK. The band's sound has been described as "inspired by classic American pop of the late '60s and early '70s" by Rovi and "an ocean-soaked, harmony-heavy homage to California's dreamy dreams, shaking ground, and unrelenting sunshine" by Pitchfork.

== Career ==
=== 1997–2004: Early history and So Much for the City ===
The Thrills were formed in the Dublin suburb of Blackrock in 1997, when neighbours Conor Deasy and Daniel Ryan formed the Cheating Housewives with friends Kevin Horan, Padraic McMahon and Ben Carrigan. Several of the members attended primary school together at Hollypark Boys School in Foxrock. In 1999, the band spent four months living in San Diego, California during which time they wrote several of the tracks that would eventually appear on their debut album So Much for the City (such as "One Horse Town"). Upon returning to Dublin, they began writing and demoing more material, hoping to secure a record deal – which they soon did with local label Supremo Records, home of fellow Irish band Chicks. The relationship with Supremo produced no releases and was short-lived; when they were dropped by the label several months later, the band members pointedly chose not to inform their parents.

During a trip to San Francisco, California in 2001, the band decided to change their name to The Thrills. Later that year, they recorded six songs over the span of two demos. The second demo made a favourable impression on Johnny Davis of Bright Star Recordings and BMG Publishing. Through Davis, indie label Rough Trade Records became aware of the band and was impressed, offering the Thrills the money to record another demo. The Rough Trade demo was recorded, but by then label interest in the band had grown rapidly, with up to thirty A&R staffers and record personnel attending the band's next musical showcase gig. In September 2002, The Thrills signed with Virgin Records, attracted by the promise of artistic freedom and the label's decision to allow them to record their debut record in Hollywood, Los Angeles with producer Tony Hoffer who had previously worked with Beck and Air.

After releasing their debut EP in November 2002, the band flew to Los Angeles, California in December 2002 to record their debut album So Much for the City. So Much for the City was released on 27 May 2003, debuting at number one in Ireland and number three in the UK and going platinum in both the UK and Irish Album Charts. The album was preceded by three singles: "One Horse Town", "Big Sur", and "Don't Steal Our Sun". The album was nominated for the 2003 Mercury Prize but lost to Dizzee Rascal's Boy in da Corner. The album also won the 2003 Q Award for Best New Act, and Best New Act at the 2003 Irish Meteor Awards.

In 2004 The Thrills won an EBBA Award. Every year the European Border Breakers Awards recognise the success of ten emerging artists or groups who reached audiences outside their own countries with their first internationally released album in the past year.

=== 2004–2006: Let's Bottle Bohemia ===
The Thrills' second album Let's Bottle Bohemia was released on 13 September 2004. Like their previous debut album, it was recorded in Los Angeles, California, this time with Dave Sardy as producer, featuring orchestration by Van Dyke Parks and a guest mandolin performance by R.E.M.'s Peter Buck. The album enjoyed similar success to the band's debut, entering the charts at number one in Ireland and number nine in the UK, largely on the back of the singles "Whatever Happened To Corey Haim?" and "Not for All the Love in the World".

That same year, the band took part in the Band Aid 20 charity assemble, and performed the song "Santa Cruz (You're Not That Far)" at the Live 8 Edinburgh 50,000 - The Final Push charity concert, which is also featured on the DVD release of the event. The band also performed a medley with Ronnie Wood of their single "The Irish Keep Gatecrashing" and the Rod Stewart song "Maggie May" at the Irish Meteor Awards 2005.

The band performed a medley of songs from the album on the U.S. television series The OC in the episode entitled "The Ex-Factor".

=== 2006–2008: Extended break and Teenager ===
The band took an extended break after their second album, in an effort to evolve their sound. New material was written, and recording sessions took place in New York City during 2006. Failing to meet the band's standards, many of these new songs were ultimately discarded, and remain unreleased.

"We were definitely striving for a new standard", Deasy said in 2007. "We were willing to scrap months of work on songs, which is one of the reasons it took so long. We recorded maybe 30 songs". During an interview with indie music magazine Under The Radar in October 2007, Deasy stated: "We wrote about 30 songs for this album, and a lot of the songs we discarded. They weren't poor songs. They were perfectly good songs, but they were songs that could have fit on the first or the second album a little too easily".

More new material was written, including "Nothing Changes Around Here" and "The Midnight Choir" which became the opening track for Teenager and was also released as a single. At the suggestion of R.E.M., the five relocated to a renovated morgue (owned by Canadian musician Bryan Adams) in inner-city Vancouver, Canada to record their third album with Tony Hoffer, who had previously produced their debut album.

The band's third album, Teenager was released in Ireland on 22 July 2007 and in Europe days later on 25 July. It failed to light up the UK and Irish charts yet received generally positive reviews, getting a Metacritic score of 71%, positive reviews from BBC Music, 7/10 from the NME, a 6.9/10 from Pitchfork and a 2/5 review from The Guardian. A special CD/DVD edition of Teenager – which contained a film-length documentary about the band entitled The Thrills: The End of Innocence – was given limited release in the UK only.

=== 2008–2011: Post-Teenager and 2002–2007 compilation ===
The band was dropped by EMI in 2008 after the poor performance of Teenager, which only charted at number 48 in the UK.

In an August 2010 interview with The Irish Times, Ben Carrigan confirmed that The Thrills remained on indefinite hiatus. At the time, Carrigan was working on his debut solo record entitled The Greatest Narrators, which was released on 23 September 2011 on Small Town Records. The first single from this album "You Knew It All Along" was released on 19 August 2011.

While promoting his album in September 2011, Carrigan said of The Thrills: "We're just on a hiatus. We haven't done anything since 2008, when we toured Australia. We never split up, but we're all working on other projects. In time, I'm sure we'll get back together. It just got a bit crazy for a while because we were away from home, so we needed to take a break". During an interview with Hot Press in late October 2011 Carrigan stated: "It's like a past life now, the whole Thrills thing, to be honest. Which is kind of nice because it's good to always feel like you're moving forward as opposed to looking back and wondering what might have been".

On 22 August 2011, Virgin Records, The Thrills' former label, released a 'best of' compilation entitled 2002–2007. The compilation contained no previously unreleased or bonus material; all the tracks had been previously released in The Thrills' first three studio albums. To date, 2002–2007 has not been released in stores; the disc is only available through Amazon's UK site. A digital-only edition is available on Amazon's US site.

Kevin Horan would go on to join Little Green Cars as a touring member with Daniel Ryan as their manager.

=== 2026-present: Comeback ===
On November 20, 2026, The Thrills announced their upcoming July 1, 2027 performance at Trinity College Dublin, which would be their first show since 2008.

== In popular culture ==
- The band's US west coast ethos was satirised by Irish television personality Dustin the Turkey on his 2005 song "Stillorgan 90210" from the album Bling When You're Mingin'.

== Discography ==
=== Studio albums ===
List of studio albums, with selected chart positions, sales figures and certifications
Title	Album details	Peak chart positions										Certifications
Title	Album details	IRE	BEL	FRA	ITA	NED	NOR	SWE	UK	US	US Heat	Certifications
So Much for the City	Released: 27 May 2003; Label: Virgin	1	—	100	47	75	28	23	3	—	14	BPI: Platinum
Let's Bottle Bohemia	Released: 13 September 2004; Label: Virgin	1	79	183	—	85	—	—	9	152	6	IRMA: Platinum; BPI: Gold
Teenager	Released: 22 July 2007; Label: Virgin	24	—	—	—	—	—	—	48	—	—	
"—" denotes a recording that did not chart or was not released in that territory.

=== EPs ===
Year	Title
2007	The Thrills Bite Size

=== Singles ===
Year	Single	IRE	ITA	NED	SCO	UK	US AAA	Album
2002	"Santa Cruz (You're Not That Far)"	—	—	—	—	107	—	So Much for the City
2003	"One Horse Town"	7	—	—	27	18	4	So Much for the City
2003	"Big Sur"	9	44	55	12	17	—	So Much for the City
2003	"Santa Cruz (You're Not That Far)" (reissue)	17	—	—	32	33	—	So Much for the City
2003	"Don't Steal Our Sun"	38	—	—	48	45	—	So Much for the City
2004	"Whatever Happened to Corey Haim?"	17	—	—	20	22	—	Let's Bottle Bohemia
2004	"Not for All the Love in the World"	38	—	—	43	39	15	Let's Bottle Bohemia
2005	"The Irish Keep Gate-crashing"	44	—	—	51	48	—	Let's Bottle Bohemia
2007	"Nothing Changes Around Here"	—	—	—	13	40	—	Teenager
2007	"The Midnight Choir"	—	—	—	—	—	—	Teenager

=== Other contributions ===
- WFUV: City Folk Live VII (2004) – "Santa Cruz"
- Music from the OC: Mix 2 (2004, Warner Bros./Wea) – "Big Sur"
- Eklektikos Live (2005) – "Say it Ain't So"
- The Acoustic Album (2006, Virgin) – "Santa Cruz"
