= The Poppy Family =

Canadian pop music group (1968–1972)

- Origin: Vancouver, British Columbia, Canada
- Genre: Psychedelic pop
- Years active: 1968–1972
- Label: London
- Past members: Susan Jacks; Terry Jacks; Craig McCaw; Satwant Singh

The Poppy Family was a Canadian psychedelic pop group based in Vancouver. They achieved several internationally successful records during the late 1960s and early 1970s.

== Career ==
Seventeen-year-old Susan Pesklevits met Terry Jacks in the mid-1960s when he appeared as a guest on the national teen television show Music Hop, where she was a regular performer. She later called on Jacks to accompany her on rhythm guitar for one of her live appearances. Eventually, although she continued to do solo shows on television, with the addition of Craig McCaw on lead guitar, Susan decided that all her live performances would be as part of her newly formed trio. The name Poppy Family was chosen when Susan, Terry and Craig were searching for a new name and, in a dictionary, came across those two words, defined as "varied species of flowering plant, etc.", and felt it applied to them. Susan and Terry were married in 1967, and Susan Pesklevits became Susan Jacks. Craig McCaw later introduced Satwant Singh on tabla drums from India, and the Poppy Family's unique sound was complete.

With Susan Jacks on lead vocals, harmony vocals and percussion, Terry Jacks on rhythm guitar and occasional vocals, Craig McCaw on guitar/sitar, and Satwant Singh on tablas/drums and other percussion, the group recorded their first album, from which came their international hit "Which Way You Goin' Billy?" (No. 1 in Canada, No. 1 in Cashbox and No. 2 on the U.S. Billboard Hot 100). The album also produced "That's Where I Went Wrong" (No. 9 in Canada, No. 29 in the US). Both songs were Top 10 Adult Contemporary chart hits as well.

Their second and last album, Poppy Seeds, was recorded with studio musicians after Satwant and Craig both quit the band following their engagement at Expo '70 in Japan. Although the Poppy Family name continued to be used, Terry's participation as a musician and singer was limited. Poppy Seeds contained their hits "Where Evil Grows" (No. 6 in Canada, No. 45 US), "Good Friends?" (No. 10 in Canada, "Bubbling Under" No. 105, and Adult Contemporary chart, US), "Tryin'" (No. 12 Country chart in Canada), "I Was Wondering" (No. 3 AC in Canada, US Top No. 100), "No Good to Cry" (No. 8 in Canada, US Top No. 100), and "I'll See You There" (No. 1 AC chart in Canada). "Where Evil Grows" and "Good Friends?" both also hit the US AC chart. The Poppy Family's first two Canadian releases were "Beyond the Clouds" (1968), "What Can The Matter Be?" (1969).

At their career peak, Susan and Terry appeared on Bobby Darin's successful 1970 television variety special, The Darin Invasion, which was filmed in Canada. They also appeared on other variety shows including Rollin' on the River with Kenny Rogers and The George Kirby Special. During television appearances, Terry lip-synced the harmonies while Susan sang her own harmony vocals. When doing a song like "Which Way You Goin' Billy?" Terry's lip syncing helped create a more convincing "group-like" presence. Susan enjoyed performing live, but Terry did not want to tour, and their career ultimately suffered.

The "Which Way You Goin' Billy?" single earned the group two 1970 Gold Leaf (Juno) Awards as well as two Moffatt Awards that same year. The Juno Award is Canada's equivalent of the Grammy Award. The single version of "Which Way You Goin' Billy?" went on to sell a total of more than 3½ million worldwide, and was awarded a million-selling Gold disc from the RIAA.

The Poppy Family name was dropped in 1972 and, although Terry had been releasing singles under his own name since 1970, the two recorded solo albums: Susan's I Thought of You Again and Terry's Seasons in the Sun. Susan left the marriage in early 1973, before the albums were released.

"Where Evil Grows" is used in Season 2 Episode 4 of Killing Eve. The song is also used in the 2020 film Sonic the Hedgehog for a scene where the film's villain, Dr. Ivo Robotnik (played by Jim Carrey), dances to the song.

== Discography ==
=== Studio albums ===
Year	Album	Peak chart positions		Label
Year	Album	CAN	US	Label
1969	Which Way You Goin' Billy?	22	76	London
1971	Poppy Seeds	16	—	London

=== Compilation albums ===
Year	Album	Label
1996	A Good Thing Lost	W.A.R.

=== Singles ===
Year	Single	Peak chart positions								Album
Year	Single	CAN	CAN AC	CAN Country	US	US AC	AUS	NZ	UK	Album
1968	"Beyond the Clouds"	75	—	—	—	—	—	—	—	Which Way You Goin' Billy?
1969	"What Can the Matter Be"	53	—	—	—	—	—	—	—	Which Way You Goin' Billy?
1969	"Which Way You Goin' Billy?"	1	5	—	2	6	95	—	7	Which Way You Goin' Billy?
1970	"That's Where I Went Wrong"	9	8	—	29	7	61	20	—	Which Way You Goin' Billy?
1970	"Shadows on My Wall"	—	7	—	—	—	—	—	—	Which Way You Goin' Billy?
1971	"I Was Wondering"	27	3	—	100	—	—	—	—	Poppy Seeds
1971	"Where Evil Grows"	6	2	—	45	16	—	—	—	Poppy Seeds
1971	"No Good to Cry"	8	8	—	80	—	—	—	—	Poppy Seeds
1972	"I'll See You There"	—	1	—	—	—	—	—	—	Poppy Seeds
1972	"Good Friends"	10	1	—	105	34	—	—	—	Poppy Seeds
1972	"Tryin'"	—	—	12	—	—	—	—	—	Poppy Seeds
1973	"You Don't Know What Love Is"	—	—	—	—	—	—	—	—	

== See also ==
- Canadian rock
- Music of Canada
