= So Much for the City =

Studio album by The Thrills
- Released: 27 May 2003
- Recorded: October 2002 – March 2003
- Genre: Indie pop
- Length: 46:24
- Label: Virgin
- Producer: Tony Hoffer

The Thrills chronology
So Much for the City (2003)	Let's Bottle Bohemia (2004)

Singles from So Much for the City
- 1. "Santa Cruz (You're Not That Far)" Released: 11 November 2002; 2. "One Horse Town" Released: 10 March 2003; 3. "Big Sur" Released: 21 May 2003; 4. "Don't Steal Our Sun" Released: 24 November 2003

Professional ratings
Aggregate scores
Source	Rating
Metacritic	72/100
Review scores
Source	Rating
AllMusic	4/5 stars
Entertainment Weekly	B+
The Guardian	3/5 stars
The Independent	4/5 stars
Los Angeles Times	4/4 stars
Pitchfork	6.9/10
Q	4/5 stars
Rolling Stone	3/5 stars
Spin	B+
The Village Voice	C

So Much for the City is the debut album of the Irish indie/pop band The Thrills. It was released on 27 May 2003 and quickly achieved success in Ireland, spending 61 weeks in the top 75 of the Irish Albums Chart. The album also won 'Album of the Year' at the national music awards. It gained significant popularity in the UK, debuting at number 3 and remaining in the UK Albums Chart for 25 weeks. The single "Big Sur" reached number 17 in the UK Singles Chart, which remains their highest charted position in the country to date.

In an interview, lead singer Conor Deasy explained the band's inspiration for the song material:

Those songs are our ways of picking us up because we were kind of miserable. We were dropped by our label. And the towns are put [in the songs] as a way of escapism, as opposed to documenting little tales about what happened when we went there. When we put in a title like "Santa Cruz (You're Not That Far)," it would literally pick us up a bit.

The album was nominated for the 2003 Mercury Prize but lost to Dizzee Rascal's Boy in da Corner.

== Legacy ==
The album was included in the book 1001 Albums You Must Hear Before You Die.

The song "Santa Cruz (You're Not That Far)" was ranked by Q Magazine at number 550 on their list of the 1001 best songs ever made.

The song "Say It Ain't So" appeared on US President George W. Bush's iPod in 2005.

== Track listing ==
1. "Santa Cruz (You're Not That Far)" – 4:13
2. "Big Sur" – 3:07
3. "Don't Steal Our Sun" – 2:50
4. "Deckchairs and Cigarettes" – 4:58
5. "One Horse Town" – 3:15
6. "Old Friends, New Lovers" – 4:01
7. "Say It Ain't So" – 2:44
8. "Hollywood Kids" – 5:33
9. "Just Travelling Through" – 3:21
10. "Your Love Is Like Las Vegas" – 2:23
11. "'Til the Tide Creeps In" / "Plans" (hidden track) – 10:06

== Singles ==
- "Santa Cruz (You're Not That Far)" (November 11, 2002)
- "One Horse Town" (March 10, 2003)
- "Big Sur" (June 9, 2003)
- "Santa Cruz (You're Not That Far)" (re-issue) (August 25, 2003)
- "Don't Steal Our Sun" (November 24, 2003)

== Charts ==
=== Weekly charts ===
Chart (2003)	Peak position
Dutch Albums (Album Top 100)	75
French Albums (SNEP)	100
Irish Albums (IRMA)	1
Italian Albums (FIMI)	53
Norwegian Albums (VG-lista)	28
Scottish Albums (Official Charts)	2
Swedish Albums (Sverigetopplistan)	23
UK Albums (Official Charts)	3

=== Year-end charts ===
Chart (2003)	Position
UK Albums (OCC)	46
