= Stop and Smell the Roses (song) =

Single by Mac Davis

from the album Stop and Smell the Roses
- B-side: "Poor Boy Boogie"
- Released: August 1974
- Genre: Pop
- Length: 2:57
- Label: Columbia
- Songwriters: Doc Severinsen, Mac Davis
- Producer: Gary Klein

Mac Davis singles chronology
"One Hell of a Woman" (1974)	"Stop and Smell the Roses" (1974)	"Rock 'N' Roll (I Gave You the Best Years of My Life)" (1975)

"Stop and Smell the Roses" is a 1974 song by the American singer-songwriter Mac Davis. The song was written by Davis and the noted bandleader and trumpeter Doc Severinsen.

Released as a single from his album of the same name, the song "Stop and Smell the Roses" became Davis' second top 10 hit on the U.S. pop chart, where it peaked at No. 9 in the fall of 1974. The song remained in the Top 40 for ten weeks. On the U.S. easy listening chart, "Stop and Smell the Roses" became the singer's second number-one hit, following "Baby, Don't Get Hooked on Me". On the U.S. country music chart, where Davis has enjoyed considerable success, the song reached No. 40. Also that year, Henson Cargill took a rendition to No. 29 on the same chart.

Severinsen was best known as the bandleader on the NBC late-night talk show The Tonight Show. Davis was an occasional guest on the show, and during this time the two became acquainted. Following an appearance on the show, Severinsen approached Davis with the idea of recording a song that included the phrase "stop and smell the roses", since he had recently heard the phrase from a physician. Soon after, Davis vacationed in Hawaii and wrote the song, crediting Severinsen as a co-writer for giving him the idea. Severinsen was quoted as saying that Davis "could have gone ahead and written the song and not done that." On an episode of Gilbert Gottfried's Amazing Colossal Podcast, Davis remembered calling Severinsen and saying, "I think we wrote a hit!"

The lyrics to the song advise that while it is often necessary to forsake family obligations and pleasurable activities to succeed professionally, everyone should make sure that they take some time to "stop and smell the roses along the way".

== Chart performance ==
=== Weekly charts ===
Chart (1974)	Peak position
Canadian RPM Top Singles	3
Canadian RPM Adult Contemporary	5
Canadian RPM Country Tracks	11
U.S. Billboard Hot 100	9
U.S. Billboard Easy Listening	1
U.S. Billboard Hot Country Singles	40
U.S. Cash Box Top 100	7

=== Year-end charts ===
Chart (1974)	Rank
Canada RPM Top Singles	73
Opus	97

== See also ==
- List of Billboard Easy Listening number ones of 1974
