= Santa Cruz (You're Not That Far) =

2002 single by the Thrills

Single by the Thrills

from the album So Much for the City
- B-side: "Blue September"; "Don't Play It Cool"
- Released: 11 November 2002
- Length: 4:12
- Label: Virgin
- Songwriters: Conor Deasy; the Thrills
- Producer: Tony Hoffer

The Thrills singles chronology
"Santa Cruz (You're Not That Far)" (2002)	"One Horse Town" (2003)

"Santa Cruz (You're Not That Far)" is a song by Irish band the Thrills, released as the lead single from their first album, So Much for the City. It was released on 11 November 2002 as the band's debut single but did not chart anywhere at first. After the song was re-released on 25 August 2003 following the success of "Big Sur", it reached number 17 on the Irish Singles Chart and number 33 on the UK Singles Chart. Q Magazine ranked the song at number 550 on their 2003 list of the "1001 Best Songs Ever Made".

== Track listings ==
All tracks are written by the Thrills.

CD single
No.	Title	Length
1.	"Santa Cruz (You're Not That Far)"	4:12
2.	"Blue September"	3:39

DVD single
No.	Title	Length
1.	"Santa Cruz (You're Not That Far)"
2.	"It's So Easy"
3.	"Just Travelling Through"
4.	"Santa Cruz (You're Not That Far)" (Video)

7-inch vinyl
No.	Title	Length
1.	"Santa Cruz (You're Not That Far)"
2.	"Blue September"
3.	"Don't Play It Cool"

Digital download
No.	Title	Length
1.	"Santa Cruz (You're Not That Far)" (Radio Edit)	3:37
2.	"Blue September"	3:39

== Charts ==
Chart (2003)	Peak position
Ireland (IRMA)	17
Scottish Singles Sales (Official Charts)	32
UK Singles (Official Charts)	33

== Release history ==
Region	Date	Format(s)	Label(s)	Ref.
United Kingdom	11 November 2002	7-inch vinyl; CD	Virgin	
Japan	26 March 2003	CD	Virgin	
United Kingdom (re-release)	25 August 2003	7-inch vinyl; CD; DVD	Virgin	
