= Big Sur (The Thrills song) =

2003 single by the Thrills

Single by the Thrills

from the album So Much for the City
- B-side: "No-One Likes to Be Upstaged"
- Released: 21 May 2003
- Recorded: October 2002–March 2003
- Studio: Sound Factory (Los Angeles); Strongroom (London, England); Area 51 (Dublin, Ireland)
- Length: 3:07
- Label: Virgin
- Composer: The Thrills
- Lyricist: Conor Deasy
- Producer: Tony Hoffer

The Thrills singles chronology
"One Horse Town" (2003)	"Big Sur" (2003)	"Don't Steal Our Sun" (2003)

"Big Sur" is song by Irish band the Thrills, released as the third single from their debut album, So Much for the City (2003). The song contains elements from the 1966 song "(Theme from) The Monkees". "Big Sur" was released on 21 May 2003 in Japan and on 9 June in the United Kingdom. The song reached number 17 on the UK Singles Chart, making it the most successful single release from the band in the United Kingdom. In their native Ireland, the song reached number nine, giving them their second top-10 single, after "One Horse Town". Elsewhere, the song reached number 44 in Italy and number 55 in the Netherlands.

== Track listings ==
All tracks are written by the Thrills and Conor Deasy except "Last Night I Dreamt That Somebody Loved Me", written by Morrissey and Johnny Marr.

UK and European CD single
No.	Title	Length
1.	"Big Sur"	3:07
2.	"No-One Likes to Be Upstaged"	3:24
3.	"One Horse Town" (demo)	3:12
4.	"Big Sur" (video)	3:07

UK 7-inch single
No.	Title	Length
1.	"Big Sur"	3:07
2.	"Your Love Is Like Las Vegas" (acoustic version)	3:09

Australian CD single
No.	Title	Length
1.	"Big Sur"	3:07
2.	"No-One Likes to Be Upstaged"	3:24
3.	"One Horse Town" (demo)	3:12

Japanese EP
No.	Title	Length
1.	"Big Sur"
2.	"No-One Likes to Be Upstaged"
3.	"Your Love Is Like Las Vegas" (acoustic version)
4.	"Last Night I Dreamt That Somebody Loved Me"
5.	"Santa Cruz (You're Not That Far)"

== Credits and personnel ==
Credits are lifted from the So Much for the City album booklet.

Studios

- Recorded between October 2002 and March 2003 at Sound Factory (Los Angeles), Strongroom Studios (London, England), and Area 51 Studios (Dublin, Ireland)
- Mixed between October 2002 and March 2003 at Quad Studios (New York City)
- Mastered at Bernie Grundman Mastering (Hollywood, California)

Personnel

- The Thrills – music, arrangement
  - Conor Deasy – song, vocals, guitars
  - Kevin Horan – backing vocals, pianos, organs, synthesizers
  - Pádraic McMahon – backing vocals, guitars, bass
  - Daniel Ryan – backing vocals, guitar, banjo, bass
  - Ben Carrigan – drums, percussion
- Tony Hoffer – production, engineering
- John Paterno – engineering
- Steven Rhodes – engineering
- Michael H. Brauer – mixing
- Brian "Big Bass" Gardner – mastering

== Charts ==
Chart (2003)	Peak position
Europe (Eurochart Hot 100)	57
Ireland (IRMA)	9
Italy (FIMI)	44
Netherlands (Single Top 100)	55
Scottish Singles Sales (Official Charts)	12
UK Singles (Official Charts)	17

== Release history ==
Region	Date	Format(s)	Label(s)	Ref.
Japan	21 May 2003	CD	Virgin	
United Kingdom	9 June 2003	7-inch vinyl; CD	Virgin	
Australia	1 September 2003	CD	Virgin	
