= Susan Jacks =

Canadian singer-songwriter (1948–2022)

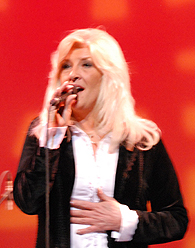
- Jacks performing in 2008

Background information
- Born: Susan Pesklevits; 19 August 1948; Saskatoon, Saskatchewan, Canada
- Died: 25 April 2022 (aged 73) Surrey, British Columbia, Canada
- Genres: Country music, pop music, easy listening
- Occupations: Singer-songwriter, record producer
- Instruments: Vocals, guitar
- Years active: 1963–2022
- Labels: Columbia, A&M, London, Mercury
- Formerly of: The Poppy Family

Susan Jacks (née Pesklevits; 19 August 1948 – 25 April 2022) was a Canadian singer-songwriter and record producer.

== Career ==
Susan Pesklevits was born on 19 August 1948 to a family of eight children in Saskatoon, Saskatchewan. Her family moved to British Columbia when she was nine, settling in Haney. She began her professional career at 15 when she was asked to be a regular performer on the national Canadian television show, Music Hop.

She also appeared on several other national television shows and regularly did live performances in the British Columbia and Alberta areas. She recorded her first singles with two other well known Vancouver performers, Howie Vickers and Tom Northcott, under the name of "The Eternal Triangle".

In 1966, 18-year-old Susan Pesklevits asked Terry Jacks to accompany her on guitar for an upcoming appearance. Susan performed a small number of dates with Terry accompanying her on guitar. They decided to add Craig McCaw on lead guitar and, although she continued to make various solo television appearances, Susan made the decision to stop performing live as a solo artist, left the "Eternal Triangle" and dedicated her time to the newly formed trio. The trio used the name "Powerline" for a number of months before settling on the name "The Poppy Family". Susan and Terry married in 1967. Craig McCaw introduced Satwant Singh to the group and he soon joined the trio on tablas.

The group began recording as "The Poppy Family featuring Susan Jacks" and had a number of hits from 1968 through the early 1970s. "Which Way You Goin' Billy?", originally called "Which Way You Goin' Buddy?", was written from a male perspective but was re-written at Susan's suggestion to be sung by a female. Susan's brother Billy's name was chosen to replace "Buddy" and the song went on to sell nearly four million copies worldwide, hitting No. 1 in Canada, No. 1 in Cashbox and No. 2 in Billboard in the United States. "That's Where I Went Wrong" and "Where Evil Grows" also charted well on Billboard. They consequently followed up with numerous hits in Canada.

Terry released Satwant Singh and Craig McCaw from the group in 1970 and, although the name Poppy Family was still used, Susan essentially became a solo artist, with the exception of one or two duets with Terry. She often performed Poppy Family hits on television shows including Rollin' On The River, The Bobby Darin Show and The George Kirby Special.

In 1972, the Poppy Family name was dropped and Susan and Terry worked together in the studio to record their solo albums. Susan's album was titled I Thought of You Again and Terry's titled Seasons in the Sun. Both albums were released in 1973 after Susan left the marriage. The title song on Susan's album earned her a Juno nomination for Canadian Female Vocalist of the Year while Terry was nominated as Male Vocalist of the Year for his album. Susan continued to have hits and other Juno nominations in Canada with songs including "I Thought of You Again", "Forever", "Evergreen", "You Don't Know What Love Is", "I Want You To Love Me", "Build A Tower", and "Love Has No Pride". With the release of her Dream album in 1975, Susan was nominated for her single "Anna Marie".

In 1976, Jacks signed with Polydor Records. Her 1980 Ghosts album garnered her a Juno nomination with her single "All The Tea in China". In 1982 her Forever album was released. As a solo artist, she appeared regularly on tour as well as television shows including The Bobby Vinton Show, The Alan Thicke Show and numerous talk shows. She was also featured in a special called Caught in the Act and a Christmas special at Whistler Mountain.

In 1977, Susan met Canadian Football League player Ted Dushinski. They married in 1980 and had a son, Thad. The family moved to Nashville, Tennessee in 1983 where she recorded the Juno-nominated song, "Another Woman's Man". She was voted the best new country artist in Oklahoma for her song "Tall Dark Stranger". She became a staff songwriter for a Nashville publishing company and had several songs recorded, including a children's song on a Grammy nominated album entitled "Snuggle Up". Jacks later co-wrote and sang "Looking For Love" for the movie The Last Chance Cafe.

In 2004, Jacks returned to Canada when her husband was diagnosed with lung cancer. He died on 24 October 2005. Upon returning, she was told she was in kidney failure and performed on a limited basis as her strength deteriorated. In 2010, Jacks received a kidney transplant donated by her brother Bill. A few months after the transplant, Jacks was again on stage and, on 17 April 2011, performed a benefit concert for the Kidney Foundation of Canada to raise awareness of the need for organ donation.

Jacks was inducted into the BC Entertainment Hall of Fame on 27 June 2010. Her album Dream, originally released in 1976, but abruptly removed from the market, was re-released in 2015. In 2016, Jacks was hospitalized with life-threatening complications from kidney failure.

== Death ==
Jacks died as a result of kidney disease–related infections at Surrey Memorial Hospital on 25 April 2022, at the age of 73. She was survived by a son, five brothers, a sister and two half-brothers.

== Discography ==
=== Albums ===
Year	Album	CAN
1973	I Thought of You Again...	—
1975	Dream	93
1976	The World of Susan Jacks and the Poppy Family	—
1980	Ghosts	—
1982	Forever	—

=== Singles ===
Year	Single	Chart Positions			
Year	Single	CAN	CAN AC	CAN Country	US
1973	"You Don't Know What Love Is"	3	3	—	—
1973	"I Thought of You Again"	7	2	—	—
1974	"I Want You to Love Me"	66	7	—	—
1974	"Build a Tower"	56	14	—	—
1975	"You're a Part of Me"	41	11	—	90
1975	"Love Has No Pride"	71	—	—	—
1975	"Anna Marie"	20	—	13	—
1976	"Memories Are Made of You"	49	5	—	—
1980	"All the Tea in China"	93	11	—	—
1980	"Twice as Strong"	—	18	—	—
1981	"Evergreen"	—	5	30	—
1982	"Forever"	—	19	—	—
1982	"It Takes Two"	—	28	—	—
1984	"Another Woman's Man"	—	—	47	—
