= One Horse Town (The Thrills song) =

2003 single by the Thrills

Single by the Thrills

from the album So Much for the City
- B-side: "Car Crash"; "Don't Play It Cool"
- Released: 10 March 2003
- Length: 3:13
- Label: Virgin
- Songwriter(s): Conor Deasy; the Thrills; Paddy McBreen
- Producer(s): Tony Hoffer

The Thrills singles chronology
"Santa Cruz (You're Not That Far)" (2002)	"One Horse Town" (2003)	"Big Sur" (2003)

"One Horse Town" is the second single released by Irish band the Thrills from their debut album, So Much for the City (2003). It was released on 10 March 2003 and reached number seven on the Irish Singles Chart, becoming the band's highest-charting song in their home country. It also peaked at number 18 on the UK Singles Chart.

== Track listing ==
All tracks are written by the Thrills.

CD single and 7-inch vinyl
No.	Title	Length
1.	"One Horse Town"	3:13
2.	"Car Crash"	2:28
3.	"Don't Play It Cool"	3:23

== Charts ==
=== Weekly charts ===
Chart (2003–2004)	Peak position
Europe (Eurochart Hot 100)	57
Ireland (IRMA)	7
Scotland (OCC)	27
UK Singles (OCC)	18
US Triple-A (Billboard)	4

=== Year-end charts ===
Chart (2003)	Position
Ireland (IRMA)	91

Chart (2004)	Position
US Triple-A (Billboard)	29
