= Which Way You Goin' Billy? (song) =

Song by The Poppy Family

Single by the Poppy Family

from the album Which Way You Goin' Billy?
- B-side: "Endless Sleep"
- Released: 1969 (Canada); March 1970 (US)
- Genre: Sunshine pop
- Length: 3:27
- Label: London
- Songwriter: Terry Jacks
- Producer: Terry Jacks

The Poppy Family singles chronology
"Which Way You Goin' Billy?" (1969)	"That's Where I Went Wrong" (1970)

"Which Way You Goin' Billy?" is a song by the Canadian band the Poppy Family. First released as a single in 1969, it features on the album of the same name (1969) and was a chart-topping hit in Canada and Ireland. It was also a significant hit in other parts of the world, reaching number two on both the US Cash Box and Billboard pop charts.

The song was written by Terry Jacks and the lead vocal is performed by his wife Susan Jacks. The singer asks her husband Billy where he's going, knowing that he is leaving her. She pledges she'll still love him and stay his wife.

The single's B-side is a cover of Jody Reynolds' 1958 hit "Endless Sleep" and is sung by Terry Jacks.

== Chart performance ==
In the group's native Canada, the single hit number one on the CANCON singles chart dated 25 October 1969. It ranked as one of the ten biggest singles of the year (at number nine) on the Canadian 'List of Biggest Singles of 1969' chart. In Billboard's ranking of the Top Hits of 1970, it was listed at number 26 for the year. It also ranked at number five on the 'List of RPM Biggest Adult Contemporary Hits of 1969'.

Subsequently, issued in the United States in March 1970, it was a million-selling Gold record-certified number two smash on the Billboard Hot 100 chart that June. It was kept from the number one spot by both "Everything Is Beautiful" by Ray Stevens and "The Long and Winding Road" by The Beatles. It hit #6 on Billboard's Easy Listening chart.

In June 1970, it peaked at number two on the South African singles chart.

Released in UK, it peaked at number seven on 26 September 1970.

The song was ranked number 38 on the List of RPM Cancon number-one singles chart as published in the RPM magazine, dated June 24, 1996.

AllMusic critic Mark Deming states: "If the '70s were supposed to be about having a nice day, "Which Way You Goin' Billy?" shows the Poppy Family were one band waiting for a cloud to blot out all that annoying sunshine..."

== Covers ==
The song was covered by the Trans-Canada Highwaymen for their 2023 album, Explosive Hits Vol. 1.

== Charts ==
=== Weekly charts ===
Chart (1969–1970)	Peak position
Australia (Kent Music Report)	95
Canada Top Singles (RPM)	9
Canada Adult Contemporary (RPM)	5
Ireland (IRMA)	1
South Africa (Springbok Radio)	2
UK Singles (OCC)	7
US Billboard Hot 100	2
US Easy Listening (Billboard)	6
US Cash Box Top 100	2

=== Year-end charts ===
Chart (1969)	Rank
Canada Top Singles (RPM)	54

Chart (1970)	Rank
UK Singles (OCC)	50
US Billboard Hot 100	26
US Cash Box Top 100	8
