= Mac Davis =

American songwriter, singer and actor (1942–2020)

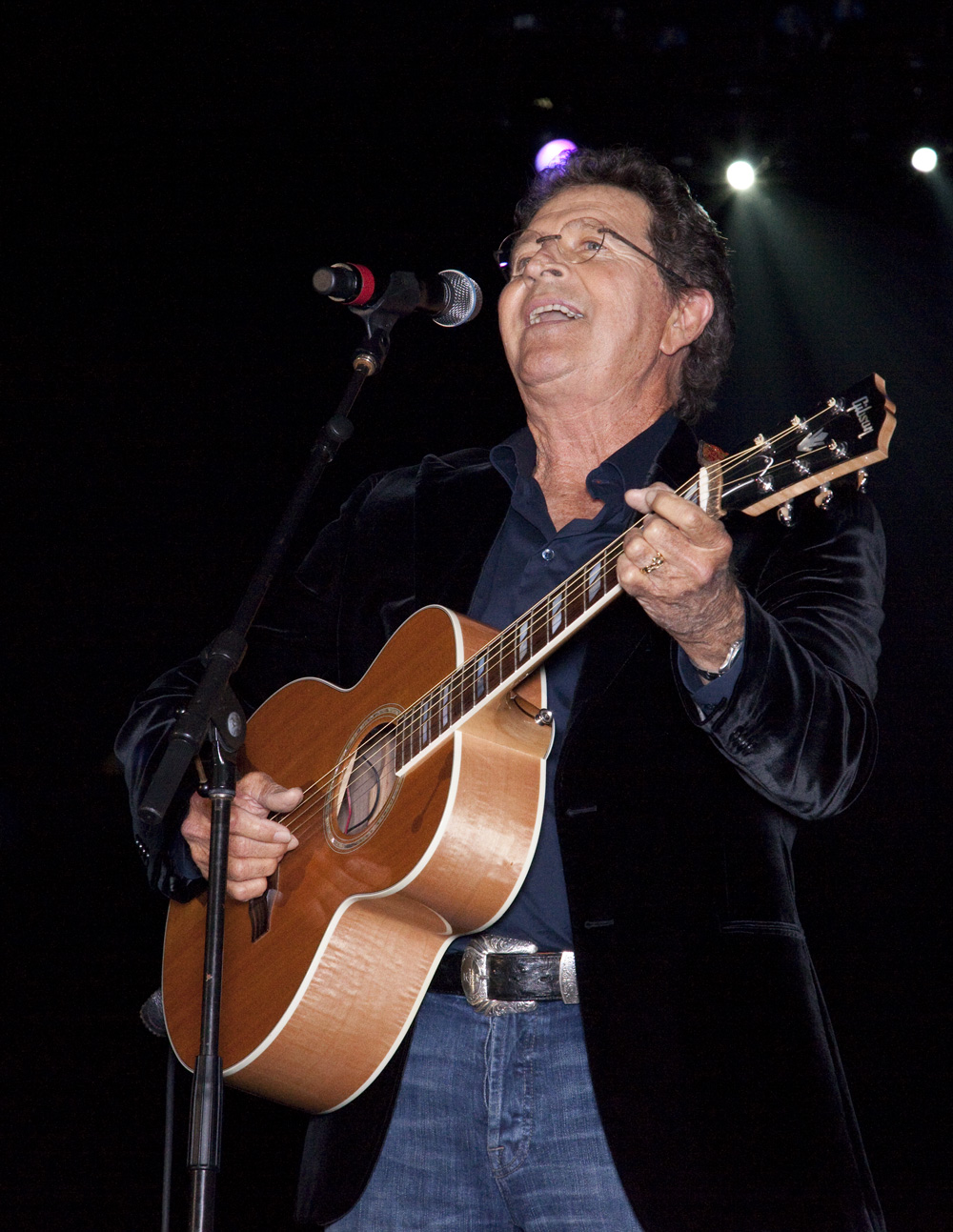
- Davis performing at the Alabama Music Hall of Fame Concert in 2010

Background information
- Born: Morris Mac Davis; January 21, 1942; Lubbock, Texas, U.S.
- Died: September 29, 2020 (aged 78) Nashville, Tennessee, U.S.
- Genre: Country • pop
- Occupations: Singer-songwriter, actor
- Instruments: Vocals, guitar
- Years active: 1962–2020
- Labels: Columbia, Casablanca, MCA
- Burial place: City of Lubbock Cemetery, Lubbock, Texas, U.S.

Morris Mac Davis (January 21, 1942 – September 29, 2020) was an American songwriter, singer, performer, and actor. A native of Lubbock, Texas, he enjoyed success as a crossover artist and writing for Elvis Presley during his early career, providing him with the hits "Memories", "In the Ghetto", "Don't Cry Daddy", and "A Little Less Conversation". A subsequent solo career in the 1970s produced hits such as "Baby Don't Get Hooked on Me". Davis also starred in his own variety show, a Broadway musical, and various films and TV shows.

== Biography ==
=== Early life ===
Davis was born and raised in Lubbock, Texas as the son of Edith Irene (Lankford) and T. J. Davis, a building contractor.

=== Career as a songwriter ===
Once Davis was settled in Atlanta, he organized a rock and roll group called the Zots, and made two singles for OEK Records, managed and promoted by OEK owner Oscar Kilgo. Davis also worked for the Vee Jay record company (home to such R&B stars as Gene Chandler, Jerry Butler, and Dee Clark) as a regional manager and later became a regional manager for Liberty Records.

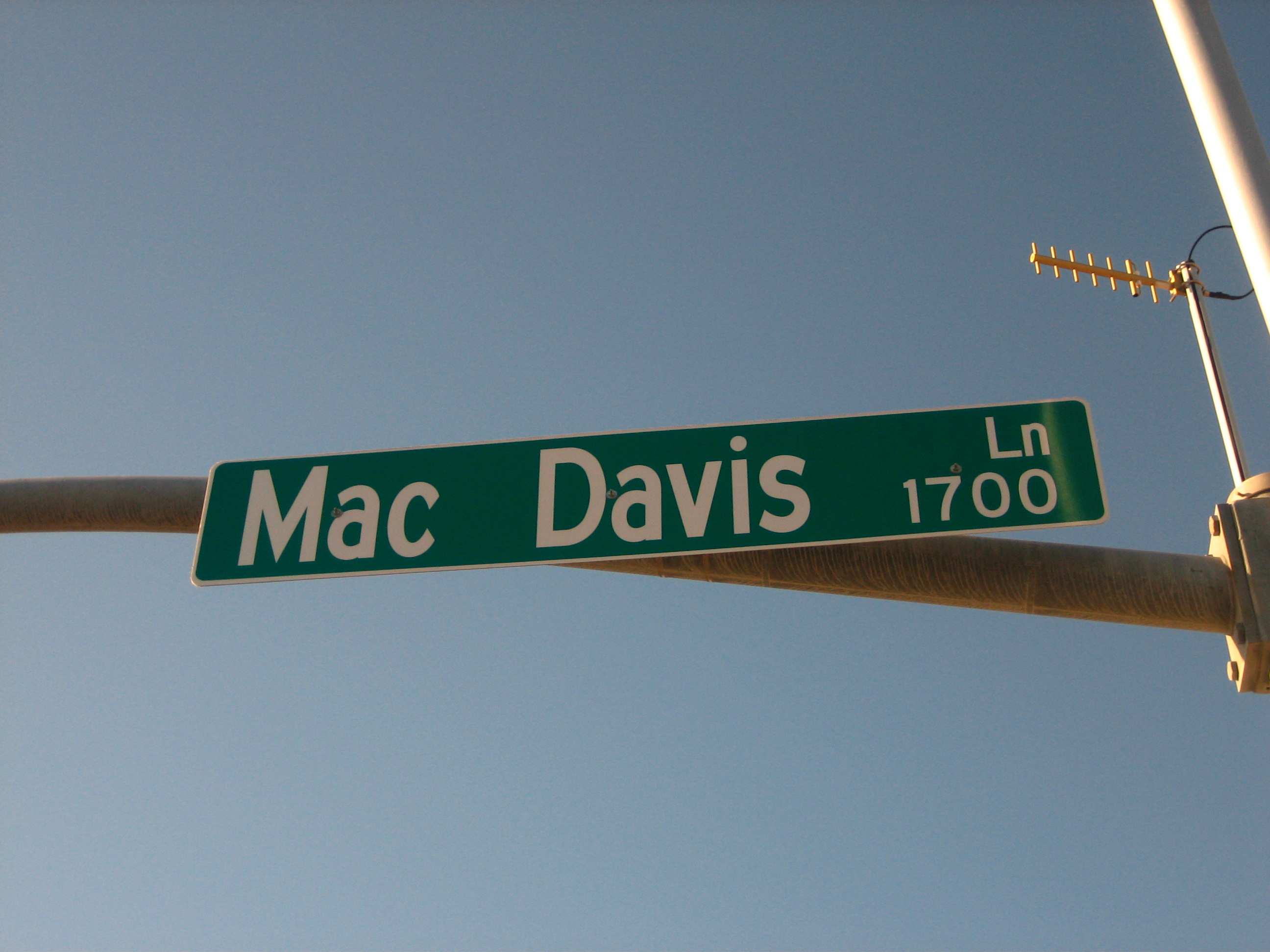
Mac Davis Lane intersects Avenue Q (U.S. Highway 84) in Davis's hometown of Lubbock.

Davis became famous as a songwriter and got his start as an employee of Nancy Sinatra's company, Boots Enterprises, Inc. Davis was with Boots for several years in the late 1960s. During his time there, he played on many of Sinatra's recordings, and she worked him into her stage shows. Boots Enterprises also acted as Davis's publishing company, publishing songs such as "In the Ghetto", "Friend, Lover, Woman, Wife", "Home", and "Memories", which were recorded by Elvis Presley, Nancy Sinatra, B. J. Thomas and many others. During a short timespan Davis used the pseudonym "Scott Davis" for songwriting purposes (borrowing from the given name of his son) to avoid confusion with songwriter Mack David. Davis left Boots Enterprises in 1970 to sign with Columbia Records, taking all of his songs with him.

One of the songs he wrote in 1968, called "A Little Less Conversation", was recorded by Elvis Presley (and became a posthumous success for Presley years later). Presley also recorded Davis's "In the Ghetto" in sessions in Memphis. Mac Davis eventually recorded the tune after Presley's version became a success, and was released in a Ronco In Concert compilation in 1975. Presley continued to record more of Davis's material, such as "Memories", "Don't Cry Daddy", and "Clean Up Your Own Backyard". Bobby Goldsboro also recorded some of Davis's songs, including "Watching Scotty Grow", which became a No. 1 Adult Contemporary success for Goldsboro in 1971. Other artists who recorded his material included Vikki Carr, O.C. Smith, and Kenny Rogers and The First Edition. "I Believe in Music", often considered to be Davis's signature song, was recorded by several artists (including Marian Love, B.J. Thomas, Louis Jordan, Perry Como, Helen Reddy, Lynn Anderson, and Davis himself) before it finally became a success in 1972 for the group Gallery.

During the 1970s, many of his songs "crossed over", successfully scoring on both the country and popular music charts, including "Baby Don't Get Hooked on Me" (a number one Grammy-nominated success), "One Hell of a Woman" (pop no. 11), and "Stop and Smell the Roses" (a no. 9 pop hit). Also, during the 1970s and 1980s, he was very active as an actor, appearing in several movies, including 1979's North Dallas Forty, as well as hosting a successful variety show. In 2010, Davis co-wrote the song "Time Flies" with Rivers Cuomo which appeared on Weezer's Hurley album. In 2013 he was part of the Los Angeles writing and producing team that created the hit "Young Girls" for Bruno Mars. Davis also wrote and collaborated with the Swedish D.J. and music producer Avicii, penning the song "Addicted to You" for Avicii's debut studio album True. They performed the song "Black and Blue" together at the Ultra Music Festival in Miami in 2013.

=== Success as a singer ===
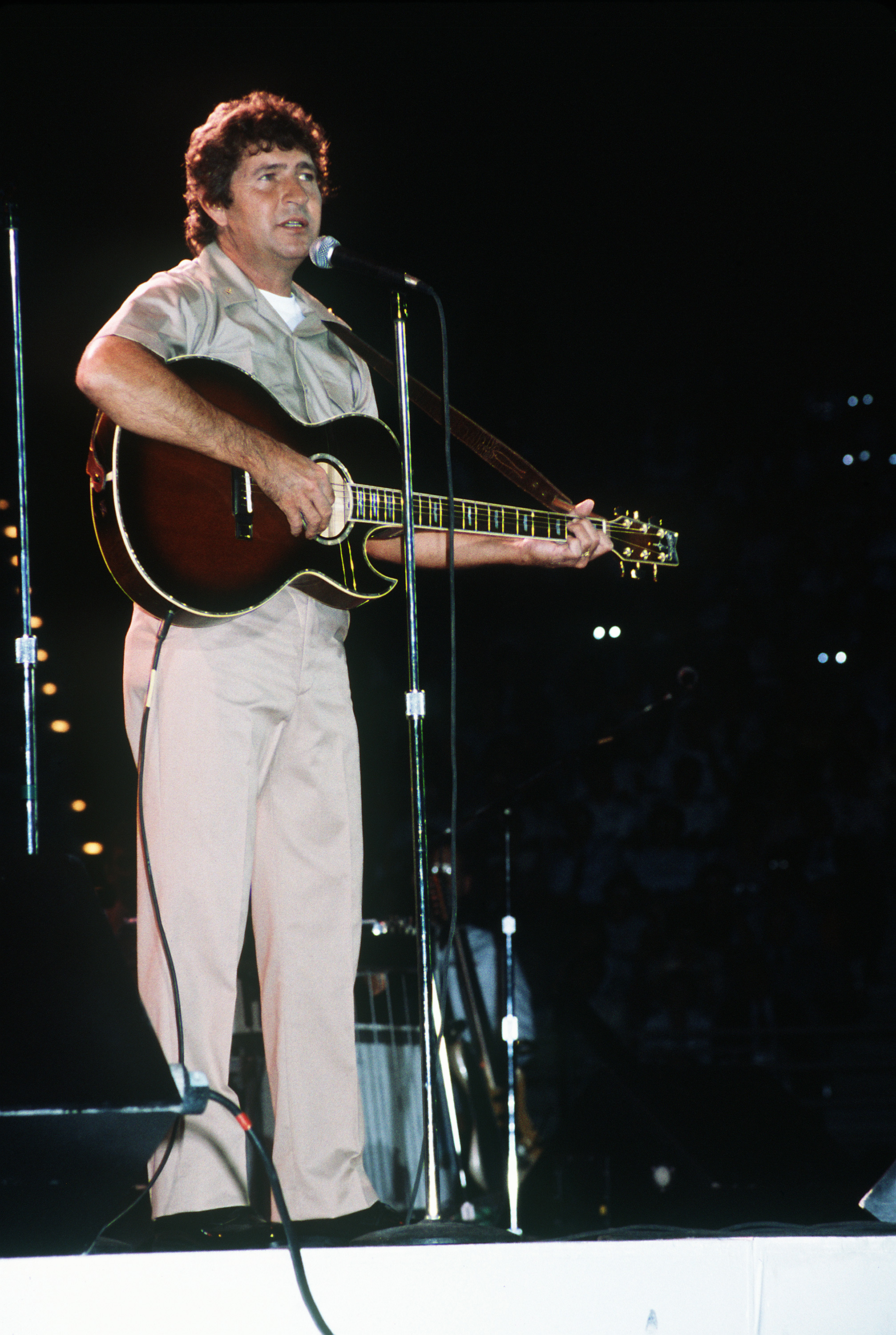
Davis performing in 1986

Davis soon decided to pursue a career of his own as a recording artist. After several years of writing songs for other artists, he was signed by Clive Davis for Columbia, later topping the Country and Pop charts with the song "Baby Don't Get Hooked on Me" in 1972. It sold over one million copies and was awarded a gold disc by the Recording Industry Association of America in September 1972.

In 1974, Davis was awarded the Academy of Country Music's Entertainer of the Year award. He had other successes including the songs "Stop and Smell the Roses" (a number one Adult Contemporary success in 1974) (pop no. 9), "One Hell of a Woman" (pop no. 11), "Rock 'N' Roll (I Gave You the Best Years of My Life)" (pop no. 15), and "Burnin' Thing" (pop no. 53). At the end of the 1970s, he was signed by Neil Bogart and moved to Casablanca Records, which was best known at the time for its successes with disco star Donna Summer and rock'n'roll band Kiss. His first success for the company in 1980 was the novelty song "It's Hard to Be Humble", a light-hearted look at how popularity and good looks could go to one's head. The song became his first Country music top 10 and a rare top 30 hit in the UK. (It was translated into Dutch as "Het is moeilijk bescheiden te blijven" and became a hit for the Dutch singer Peter Blanker in 1981). Later that year, he had another top 10 song with "Let's Keep It That Way" written by Curly Putman and Rafe Van Hoy. In November, "Rock 'N' Roll (I Gave You the Best Years of My Life)" was played by KHJ in Los Angeles as its last song before it switched from Top 40 to Country music. He achieved success with other songs like "Texas in My Rear View Mirror" and "Hooked on Music", which became his biggest Country music success in 1981 going to number 2. In 1985, he recorded his last top 10 country music success with the song "I Never Made Love (Till I Made Love With You)".

On January 19, 1985, Davis performed "God Bless the USA" at the 50th Presidential Inaugural Gala, held the day before the second inauguration of Ronald Reagan.

=== Acting career ===
From 1974 to 1976, Davis had his own television variety show on NBC, The Mac Davis Show. He made his feature film debut opposite Nick Nolte in the football film North Dallas Forty (1979) and was listed as one of 12 "Promising New Actors of 1979" by Screen World magazine.

In 1980, Davis guest-starred on an episode of The Muppet Show. He performed "Baby Don't Get Hooked On Me", "It's Hard To Be Humble", and "I Believe in Music".

Davis also starred in the 1981 comedy film Cheaper To Keep Her, playing a divorced detective who worked for a neurotic feminist attorney.

In 1983, he appeared in The Sting II, as Jake Hooker, a younger relative of Johnny Hooker, portrayed by Robert Redford in The Sting.

In November 1991, Davis checked into the Betty Ford Clinic, marking the beginning of his commitment to sobriety. Exactly four months later, he performed as Will Rogers in the Broadway production of The Will Rogers Follies at the Palace Theater, noting that it was his first-ever sober performance. Following each show, Davis shared his journey to sobriety and urged anyone battling addiction to attend an Alcoholics Anonymous meeting. He continued to play Will Rogers for over a year during the show's national tour.

In 1998, Davis starred in the sports comedy Possums, which debuted at the Sundance Film Festival. Davis served as the balladeer for the 2000 telefilm The Dukes of Hazzard: Hazzard in Hollywood, replacing Don Williams, who had served the part in 1997's The Dukes of Hazzard: Reunion! and Waylon Jennings, who narrated the original Dukes of Hazzard television show. Davis was the first balladeer to appear on-screen to welcome the audience and provide exposition. Davis was inducted into the Nashville Songwriters Hall of Fame in 2000. He was awarded a star symbol on the Hollywood Walk of Fame, located at 7080 Hollywood Boulevard, for his contribution to the recording industry.

In 2001, Davis played a fellow karaoke competitor to Jon Gries's Sunny Holiday in the Polish brothers' film Jackpot. In the film, a dispute began between Sunny's manager, played by Garrett Morris, and Davis's character about what song he should sing. The manager suggested Davis's "Baby Don't Get Hooked On Me", which Davis's character claimed just was not him.

From 2001 to 2003, Davis voiced the character of Barber Bingo on two episodes of the animated TV series Oswald; "Henry Needs A Haircut" and "The Naughty Cat".

Between 1999 and 2006, Davis provided the character voices of Sheriff Buford (two episodes) and a talk radio host named "Sports Jock" (three episodes), on the animated series King of the Hill.

Davis also guest-starred briefly in the 8 Simple Rules episode "Let's Keep Going: Part 2" in April 2004.

He had a recurring role as Rodney Carrington's father-in-law in the sitcom Rodney.

In 2000, Davis hosted Labor of Love, a live FM radio show for KZLA Los Angeles.

=== Personal life and death ===
At 21, he married Fran Cook from Georgia. Their son, Joel Scott (Scotty in "Watching Scotty Grow"), was born a year later; Davis shifted from playing in rock bands to learning the music business while working in Liberty Records' publishing division. The Liberty job got him to Los Angeles and made it easier to "pitch his own tunes" to record producers. Davis commented, "One day Fran decided to do her own thing and she wanted me to do mine." They divorced and she went back to Atlanta.

Davis next met Sarah Barg, then 16 and living in his apartment building with her mother. Two years later, they were married. "We talked about having a family, but I was waiting for her to grow up," he says. She left him in 1976 for Glen Campbell, with whom she then had one child, Dillon. She also left Campbell shortly after Dillon's birth.

In 1979, Davis started to date a young nurse, Lise Gerard. They married in 1983 when she was 25, and they had two children, Noah Claire and Cody Luke. They remained married until Davis' death at age 78 on September 29, 2020, following heart surgery.

== Filmography ==
Year	Title	Role	Notes
1979	North Dallas Forty	Seth Maxwell	
1981	Cheaper to Keep Her	Bill Dekker	
1983	The Sting II	Jake Hooker	
1985	Brothers-in-Law	T.K. "Tom" Kenny	TV movie
1988	What Price Victory	Jake Ramson	TV movie
1991	Blackmail	Norm	TV movie
1996	For My Daughter's Honor	Norm Dustin	TV movie
1998	Still Holding On: The Legend of Cadillac Jack	Clayton	TV movie
1998	Possums	Wilbur "Will" Clark	
1999	Angel's Dance	Norman	
2000	The Dukes of Hazzard: Hazzard in Hollywood	The Balladeer	TV movie
2001	Murder, She Wrote: The Last Free Man	Sheriff Underwood	TV movie
2001	Jackpot	Sammy Bones	
2003	Where the Red Fern Grows	Hod Bellington	
2004	True Vinyl	Frank Thompson	
2005	The Wendell Baker Story	Agent Buck	
2008	Beer for My Horses	Reverend J.D. Parker	
2017	Where the Fast Lane Ends	Big Jack	

== Television ==
Year	Title	Role	Notes
1970	The Johnny Cash Show	Himself (Guest Star)	Season 2, Episode 4
1973	The Midnight Special	Himself (Guest Host - Performer)	Season 1, Episode 3
1974–1976	The Mac Davis Show	Himself (Host – Performer)	TV variety show (35 episodes)
1975	The Mac Davis Special	Himself (Host – Performer)	TV special
1975	The Mac Davis Christmas Special	Himself (Host – Performer)	TV special
1976	Mac Davis Christmas Special: When I Grow Up	Himself (Host – Performer)	TV special
1977	Mac Davis: Sounds Like Home	Himself (Host – Performer)	TV special
1977	Mac Davis: I Believe in Christmas	Himself (Host – Performer)	TV special
1978	Mac Davis's Christmas Odyssey: Two Thousand and Ten	Himself (Host – Performer)	TV special
1979	A Christmas Special with Love, Mac Davis	Himself (Host – Performer)	TV special
1980	The Muppet Show	Himself (Guest Star)	Episode: "Mac Davis"
1980	Mac Davis 10th Anniversary Special: I Still Believe in Music	Himself (Host – Performer)	TV special
1980	Mac Davis – I'll Be Home for Christmas	Himself (Host – Performer)	TV special
1981	The Mac Davis Christmas Special	Himself (Host – Performer)	TV special
1983	The Mac Davis Special: The Music of Christmas	Himself (Host – Performer)	TV special
1986	Webster	Uncle Jake Tyler	Episode: "Almost Home"
1986	Tall Tales & Legends	Davy Crockett	Episode: "Davy Crockett"
1987	Dolly	Himself (Guest Star)	Episode: "A Down Home Country Christmas"
1993	The Legend of the Beverly Hillbillies	Himself (Host)	TV special
1995	Lois & Clark: The New Adventures of Superman	Larry Smiley	Episode: "Just Say Noah"
1995–1996	The Client	Waldo Gaines	3 episodes
1996	Daytona Beach	Reese Elliot	TV pilot episode
1999	Chicken Soup for the Soul	Sheriff Riley	Episode: "It's Never Too Late"
1999–2006	King of the Hill	Sheriff Mumord / Sports Jock (voice)	5 episodes
2000	That '70s Show	St. Peter	Episode: "Holy Crap"
2000	The Prosecutors: In Pursuit of Justice	Reenactment Actor	Episode: "The Bone Yard"
2001–2003	Oswald	Barber Bingo (voice)	2 episodes
2004	8 Simple Rules	Guitar Player	Episode: "Let's Keep Going: Part 2"
2004	Johnny Bravo	Bee Bearded Man / Troubadour (voice)	2 episodes
2004–2006	Rodney	Carl	13 episodes
2019	Dolly Parton's Heartstrings	Reverend Riggs	Episode: "J.J. Sneed"

== Bibliography ==
- Wolff, Kurt. The Rough Guide to Country Music. Penguin Publishing. ISBN 978-1858285344
