= Terry Jacks =

Canadian musician (born 1944)

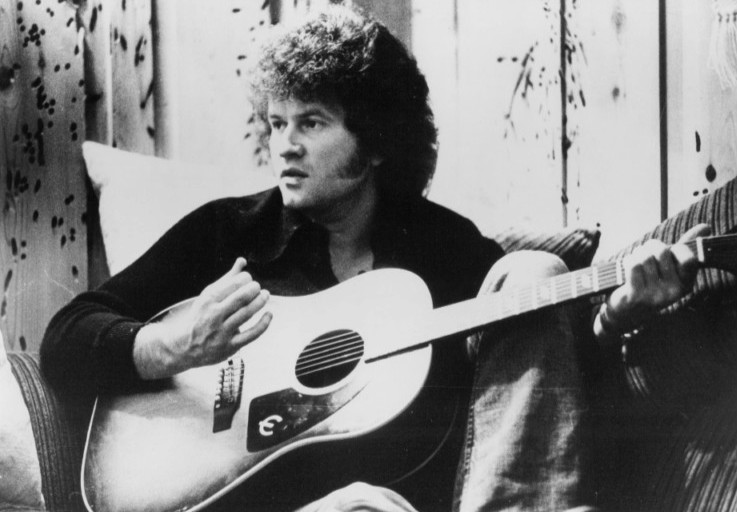
- Jacks in 1974

Background information
- Born: Terrence Ross Jacks; March 29, 1944 (age 82); Winnipeg, Manitoba, Canada
- Genres: Rock; pop; soft rock; country
- Occupation: Singer-songwriter
- Instruments: Vocals; guitar
- Years active: 1962–present
- Labels: Columbia; Goldfish; London; Bell; A&M
- Formerly of: The Poppy Family

Terrence Ross Jacks (born March 29, 1944) is a Canadian singer, songwriter, guitarist and record producer known for his 1974 hit song "Seasons in the Sun", an English adaptation of a song written by Belgian composer and singer Jacques Brel in 1961. Jacks is also an environmental activist, focused on pulp mill emissions in Howe Sound.

== Early life ==
Terry Jacks was born and raised in Winnipeg, Manitoba. Jacks was the oldest of five boys and his father ran an architecture business in Winnipeg, a career Jacks later studied in university, before he became a musician. In the early 1960s, when Jacks was a teenager, the family relocated to Vancouver. Jacks took up guitar and at 18 formed a band called The Chessmen with guitarist Guy Sobell. The group had four top-ten hits in Vancouver between 1964 and 1966.

Jacks and the Chessmen performed live on a Friday night in September 1965 for a "Back to School" event at the now-defunct T. Eaton Co. (Eaton's) department store at its Brentwood Mall store in Burnaby, a suburb of Vancouver.

Pupils from Burnaby South Senior High School who followed music tuned in to CFUN 1410 AM, which advertised its "Request Line". Being skeptical about whether CFUN really listened to requests, they began phoning the Request Line and asked for the B side of the current Chessmen hit. To their amazement, CFUN began playing it and turned the record into a two-sided hit.

Following The Chessmen, Terry and Susan Pesklevits (Susan Jacks), whom he later married, formed The Poppy Family along with Craig McCaw and Satwant Singh. They had several hits in Canada and internationally, their biggest being "Which Way You Goin' Billy?", which went to #1 in Canada and #2 on the Billboard charts in the U.S. The song was written and produced by Terry Jacks, earning him a Gold Leaf (Juno) award in 1970 for his production. The Poppy Family performed at the Lethbridge, Alberta, Stampede in the summer of 1971.

== "Seasons in the Sun" ==
"Seasons in the Sun" was intended for the Beach Boys with Jacks as the recording producer. After the group decided not to release it, Jacks decided to record it himself on his own record label, Goldfish Records, in 1973. It became the largest-selling international single by a Canadian artist at that time, selling 14 million copies worldwide. It earned Jacks two Juno Awards and became one of the biggest-selling Canadian singles of all time.

The song was based on Rod McKuen's 1965 re-write of "Le moribond", originally by Belgian singer Jacques Brel from 1962. For his version, Jacks made some modifications to the lyrics, which combined with McKuen's changes resulted in a work that bears little resemblance to Brel's original in tone, substance, and poetry. In Germany, the UK, and the United States, Jacks's rewrite was released on Bell Records, and the song went to number-one. In Canada, it was released on Jacks's own label, Goldfish Records, and distributed by London Records Canada.

Jacks later released "If You Go Away" (another McKuen adaptation of a Jacques Brel song, titled "Ne Me Quitte Pas"), which reached number 8 in the UK and number 24 in Germany, and a cover of Kevin Johnson's "Rock 'N' Roll (I Gave You the Best Years of My Life)", both of which had more success in Canada but also made the Billboard Hot 100 chart in the U.S. He wrote and recorded a number of other songs, and went on to produce for many artists, including "Crazy Talk" and "There's Something I Like About That" for Chilliwack, from their album Riding High.

Jacks produced two songs for Nana Mouskouri: "Scarborough Fair" and "Loving Arms" in 1976. He produced the Vancouver top 10 hit "Country Boy Named Willy" for Spring on London Records (number 38 Canada), and Valdy's original version of "Rock and Roll Song" (b/w sometime "Sunday Morning"). The record was scheduled for release on London Records but was re-recorded in Los Angeles with another producer when Valdy signed a recording contract. He also spent a lot of time with Buddy Knox in the 1970s and produced a single for him with two songs: "Me and You" (written by Jacks) and the George Jones song "White Lightnin'"; the single remains unreleased. Jacks also went on to produce a number of other artists in the 1980s and 1990s, including DOA, who recorded a punk rock version of "Where Evil Grows".

== 1980s ==
Jacks disliked the music business, particularly touring and promotional activities, and stopped recording in the mid-1970s, although he continued doing some music producing. Beginning in 1976, Jacks was impersonated by Timothy Wayne MacDonald for several years; the imposter gave concerts and appeared on talk shows and radio before turning himself in to Jacks.

Encouraged by friend and fellow musician Bob Buckley, Jacks decided to return to recording. His album Pulse and its single "You Fooled Me" were released in 1983 after his self-imposed break from the music business. Jacks later called Pulse a "rehearsal/demo". He released the album Just Like That in 1987, while continuing to focus on his environmental work.

== 2010s ==
Jacks and Al Jardine composed "Don't Fight the Sea", which Jardine recorded in 2011 along with Beach Boys members Mike Love, Brian Wilson, Bruce Johnston, and the late Carl Wilson, who sang part of the lead vocal. A limited edition white vinyl 45 was made and sold to benefit Japanese tsunami victims.

In 2015, Jacks released Starfish on the Beach, a double CD compilation containing 40 of Jacks' favorite tracks from the last 40 years. The release features some of his recordings from the 1970s and 1980s. The package contains a 32-page booklet with photographs and Jacks' recollections of his musical career.

== Film ==
Jacks has worked in documentary film and video, producing several shorts on environmental themes including The Faceless Ones, The Tragedy of Clearcutting, The Southern Chilcotin Mountains, and The Warmth of Love (The Four Seasons of Sophie Thomas) with cinematographer Ian Hinkle. The video production The Faceless Ones earned an Environmental Gold Award from the New York International Independent Film and Video Festival.

In 1981, Jacks became involved with a project to make a television movie version of "Seasons in the Sun". He produced, scored, and starred in the movie.

== Environmental activism ==
In 1985, Jacks founded Environmental Watch to combat pulp mill pollution on Howe Sound. Jacks filed suit against the British Columbia Environment Ministry in 1988 for granting a pollution permit to Howe Sound Pulp and Paper. The lawsuit was dropped in 1990 after the company incurred 19 pollution charges by the ministry. In 1989, he organized and led a flotilla of boats past several pulp mills in Howe Sound to protest their pollution.

In the 1990s, Jacks engaged in a multi-year legal battle against pulp mill emissions and improper amendments to the mill's permits.

Jacks was termed "instrumental" in the efforts to pass two federal laws that limited logging on the coast and constrained fish-canning by non-Canadian fishermen. His environmental work has earned him several awards including a lifetime achievement award in 1997 for his work, as well as the Eugene Rogers Environmental Award.

== Personal life ==
Jacks and Susan divorced in 1973. In the late 1970s, Jacks married his manager, Margaret Zittier. The couple had one daughter together before their divorce in 2001. Jacks married his third wife, Diane Soza, in 2008.

== Discography ==
=== Studio albums ===
- Seasons in the Sun (Bell Records) (1974)
- Y' Don't Fight the Sea (Goldfish Records) (1975)
- Pulse (A&M Records) (1983)
- Just Like That (Attic Records) (1987)
- Gone Fishin’ For Soul (Regenerator Records) (2025)

=== Compilation albums ===
- Into the Past...Terry Jacks Greatest Hits (A&M Records) (1982)
- Singles A's and B's (Goldfish Records) (2004)
- Starfish on the Beach (Regenerator Records) (2015)

=== Extended plays ===
- Epocas De Sol (Bell Records) (1974)

=== Singles ===
Year	Song	Peak chart positions						Certifications	Album
Year	Song	CAN	CAN AC	AUS	NZ	UK	US	Certifications	Album
1970	"I'm Gonna Capture You"	16	—	—	—	—	—		Non-album singles
1971	"Someone Must Have Jumped"	—	—	—	—	—	—		Non-album singles
1972	"Concrete Sea"	16	16	—	—	—	—		Seasons in the Sun
1973	"I'm Gonna Love You Too"	7	—	—	—	—	116		Seasons in the Sun
1974	"Seasons in the Sun"	1	1	1	1	1	1	BPI: Gold	Seasons in the Sun
1974	"If You Go Away"	45	10	63	—	8	68		Seasons in the Sun
1975	"Rock and Roll (I Gave You the Best Years of My Life)"	22	5	—	—	—	97		Seasons in the Sun
1975	"Christina"	9	—	—	—	—	106		Y' Don't Fight the Sea
1975	"Holly"	64	—	—	—	—	—		Y' Don't Fight the Sea
1976	"Y' Don't Fight the Sea"	31	—	—	—	—	—		Y' Don't Fight the Sea
1976	"In My Father's Footsteps"	59	—	—	—	—	—		Non-album singles
1977	"Hey Country Girl"	73	28	—	—	—	—		Non-album singles
1981	"Greenback Dollar"	—	9	—	—	—	—		Non-album singles
1983	"You Fool Me"	—	26	—	—	—	—		Pulse
1985	"Tough Guys Don't Dance"	—	—	—	—	—	—		Just Like That
1987	"Just Like That"	—	17	—	—	—	—		Just Like That
"—" denotes a recording that did not chart or was not released in that territory.

== See also ==
- List of 1970s one-hit wonders in the United States
- List of musicians from Canada
