= Juno Award for Instrumental Album of the Year =

Canadian music award

The Juno Award for "Instrumental Album of the Year" has been awarded since 1976, as recognition each year for the best instrumental album in Canada. The award was originally called the "Instrumental Artist of the Year".

== Winners ==
=== Instrumental Artist(s) of the Year (1976 - 1987) ===
Year	Performing artist(s)	Nominees	Ref.
1976	Hagood Hardy	Liona Boyd; François Dompierre; André Gagnon; Moe Koffman	
1977	Hagood Hardy	Black Light Orchestra; Al Cherney; François Dompierre; André Gagnon	
1978	André Gagnon	Liona Boyd; Hagood Hardy; Moe Koffman	
1979	Liona Boyd	Black Light Orchestra; André Gagnon; Hagood Hardy; Frank Mills	
1980	Frank Mills	Liona Boyd; André Gagnon; Hagood Hardy; Gino Soccio	
1981	Frank Mills	Liona Boyd; Hagood Hardy; Moe Koffman; Claire Lawrence	
1982	Liona Boyd	The Emeralds; André Gagnon; Hagood Hardy; Frank Mills	
1983	Liona Boyd	All-Star Swing Band; The Emeralds; Frank Mills; The Spitfire Band	
1984	Liona Boyd	Canadian Brass; Hagood Hardy; Frank Mills; The Spitfire Band	
1985	Canadian Brass	Hagood Hardy; Frank Mills; The Spitfire Band; Zamfir	
1986	David Foster	Liona Boyd; Canadian Brass; Moe Koffman; Zamfir	
1987	David Foster	Liona Boyd; Canadian Brass; Hagood Hardy; Frank Mills	

=== Instrumental Artist(s) of the Year (1989 - 1998) ===
Year	Performing artist(s)	Nominees	Ref.
1989	David Foster	Canadian Brass; Manteca; Frank Mills; Zamfir	
1990	Manteca	Liona Boyd; Canadian Brass; Frank Mills; Tafelmusik	
1991	Ofra Harnoy	Exchange (Steve Sexton and Gerald O'Brien); Michael Jones; Moe Koffman; Ian Tamblyn	
1992	Shadowy Men on a Shadowy Planet	John Arpin; Jacques de Koninck; David Foster; Graham Townsend	
1993	Ofra Harnoy	John Arpin; Exchange (Steve Sexton and Gerald O'Brien); Manteca; Skywalk	
1994	Ofra Harnoy	John Arpin; André Gagnon; Jacques de Koninck; Shadowy Men on a Shadowy Planet	
1995	André Gagnon	Hennie Bekker; Wayne Chaulk; Marie-Andree Ostiguy; Quartetto Gelato	
1996	Liona Boyd	Richard Abel; George Amatino; Hennie Bekker; André Gagnon	
1997	Ashley MacIsaac	Richard Abel; Hennie Bekker; Samuel Reid and Ernest Lyons; Sandule and Nikolai	
1998	Leahy	Jesse Cook; Oscar Lopez; Robert Michaels; Mythos	

=== Best Instrumental Album (1999 - 2002) ===
Year	Performing artist(s)	Work	Nominees	Ref.
1999	Natalie MacMaster	My Roots Are Showing	Howard Baer and Dan Gibson, Celtic Awakening; David Bradstreet and Dan Gibson, Whispering Woods; Jesse Cook, Vertigo; Casadh An tSúgáin (Oliver Schroer and John Herberman), Celtic Dance	
2000	Natalie MacMaster	In My Hands	David Bradstreet and Dan Gibson, Natural Sleep Inducement; Rob Crabtree and Oliver Schroer, The Piper's Legacy; John Herberman and Dan Gibson, Piano Cascades; Robert Michaels, Utopia	
2001	Jesse Cook	Free Fall	Oliver Schroer, Celtic Devotion; Pavlo, Fantasia; Dan Gibson, Ron Allen and Dr. Lee Bartel, Natural Massage Therapy; Dan Gibson, Ron Allen and Dr. Lee Bartel, Natural Relaxation	
2002	Oscar Lopez	Armando's Fire	Richard Abel, Inspiration Classique; Dan Gibson and David Bradstreet, Angel's Embrace; Dan Gibson and John Herberman, The English Country Garden; Kenny Vehkavaara, Fiesta Del Sol	

=== Instrumental Album of the Year (2003 - Present) ===
Year	Performing artist(s)	Work	Nominees	Ref.
2003	Robert Michaels	Allegro	Howard Baer, Celtic Mystique; Liona Boyd, Camino Latino / Latin Journey; Oliver Schroer and Dan Gibson, Lakeside Retreat; The Swingfield Big Band, Big Band Love Songs	
2004	I Sorenti	Italian Love Songs	Richard Abel, Romance; George Carlaw, Stress Less; The Covingtons, Country Christmas; Michel Cusson, Un homme et son péché	
2005	Oscar Lopez	Mi Destino/My Destiny	Longhouse, A Warrior's Journey; Loretto Reid and Dan Gibson, Celtic Reverie; Montgomery Smith, Rest & Relaxation; Kenny Vehkavaara nad Rob Piltch, Mediterranean Nights	
2006	Daniel Lanois	Belladonna	George Carlaw, Christmas Serenity; Bobby Creed & His Orchestra, Sentimental Strings; Tomas Hamilton, Balance; Nancy Walker, Rainy Days and Mondays	
2007	Sisters Euclid	Run Neil Run	Bell Orchestre, Recording a Tape the Colour of the Light; Joël Fafard, ...and another thing; Johannes Linstead, Café Tropical; Natalie MacMaster, Yours Truly	
2008	Jayme Stone	The Utmost	Bob Lanois, Snake Road; Amon Tobin, Foley Room; Richard Underhill, Kensington Suite; Joey Wright, Jalopy	
2009	DJ Brace presents The Electric Nosehair Orchestra	Nostomania	Creaking Tree String Quartet, The Soundtrack; Steve Dawson, Telescope; Inhabitants, The Furniture Moves Underneath; Tanya Tagaq, Auk/Blood	
2010	Bell Orchestre	As Seen Through The Windows	Beats on Canvas, Beats on Canvas; The Hylozoists, L'île de Sept Villes; Pavlo, Rik Emmett and Oscar Lopez, Trifecta; Sultans of String, Yalla Yalla!	
2011	Fond of Tigers	Continent & Western	David Braid and Canadian Brass, Spirit Dance; Creaking Tree String Quartet, Sundogs; The Souljazz Orchestra, Rising Sun; Jayme Stone, Room of Wonders	
2012	Stretch Orchestra	Stretch Orchestra	Andrew Collins, Cats & Dogs; MAZ, Téléscope; L'Orkestre des Pas Perdus, L'Âge du cuivre; Colin Stetson, New History Warfare Vol. 2: Judges	
2013	Pugs and Crows	Fantastic Pictures	Five Alarm Funk, Rock the Sky; Ian McDougall, The Very Thought of You; Ratchet Orchestra, Hemlock; Hugh Sicotte and Jon Ballantyne, Twenty Accident Free Work Days	
2014	Esmerine	Dalmak	Petr Cancura, Down Home; Mahogany Frog, Senna; The Peggy Lee Band, Invitation; Colin Stetson, New History Warfare Vol. 3: To See More Light	
2015	Quartango	Encuentro	Canadian Brass, Great Wall of China; Daniel Lanois, Flesh and Machine; John Stetch, Off with the Cuffs; Sultans of String, Symphony!	
2016	Colin Stetson and Sarah Neufeld	Never Were the Way She Was	Afiara Quartet and Skratch Bastid, Spin Cycle; Cris Derksen, Orchestral Powwow; Esmerine, Lost Voices; Jens Lindemann and Tommy Banks, Legacy Live	
2017	The Fretless	Bird's Nest	Blitz//Berlin, Movements 1; David Braid, Flow; Sarah Neufeld, The Ridge; Pugs & Crows and Tony Wilson, Everyone Knows Everyone	
2018	Do Make Say Think	Stubborn Persistent Illusions	Five Alarm Funk, Sweat; Kristofer Maddigan, Cuphead; Oktopus, Hapax; Peregrine Falls, Peregrine Falls	
2019	Gordon Grdina	China Cloud	Aerialists, Group Manoeuvre; Kevin Breit, Johnny Goldtooth and the Chevy Casanovas; The Fretless, Live from the Art Farm; Toninato/Thiessen, The Space Between Us	
2020	Alexandra Stréliski	Inscape	Kevin Hearn, Calm and Cents; Bill McBirnie and Bernie Senesky, The Silent Wish; Ron Davis' Symphronica, Symphronica Upfront; Tanya Tagaq, Toothsayer	
2021	Blitz//Berlin	Movements III	Bruce Cockburn, Crowing Ignites; David Foster, Eleven Words; Flore Laurentienne, Volume 1; Gordon Grdina, Prior Street	
2022	David Myles	That Tall Distance	Cœur de pirate, Perséides; Frank Evans and Ben Plotnick, Madison Archives; Jorane, Hemenetset; Jens Lindemann with Jon Kimura Parker, Matt Catingub and the Canadian All Star JazzPops Orchestra, Then is Now Rhapsody in Blue	
2023	Esmerine	Everything Was Forever Until It Was No More	Jean-Michel Blais, Aubades; The Canadian Brass, Canadiana; Hard Rubber Orchestra, Iguana; Stephan Moccio, Lionheart	
2024	Colin Stetson	When we were that what wept for the sea	Meredith Bates, Tesseract; Markus Floats, Fourth Album; Haralabos [Harry] Stafylakis, Calibrating Friction; Alexandra Stréliski, Néo-Romance	
2025	Intervals	Memory Palace	Eric Bearclaw, Distant Places; Disaster Pony, Disaster Pony; Ginger Beef, Ginger Beef; Lara Wong and Melón Jimenez, Confluencias	
2026	Aaron Paris	Lotusland	Viviane Audet, Le piano et le torrent; Jean-Michel Blais and Lara Somogyi, Désert (deluxe); Crown Lands, Ritual II; Colin Stetson, The Love It Took to Leave You	
