= Pavlo Simtikidis =

Pavlo
- Born: Pavlo Simtikidis; June 29, 1969 (age 56); Toronto, Ontario, Canada
- Origin: Toronto, Ontario, Canada
- Genres: New Flamenco, Instrumental, Latin, Jazz, World
- Occupations: Musician, guitarist, composer, record producer
- Instrument: Guitar
- Years active: 1998–present
- Labels: Sleeping Giant Music, Hejaz Entertainment, P.R.O.
- Website: www.pavlo.com

Pavlo Simtikidis, often called simply Pavlo (born June 29, 1969), is a Greek-Canadian guitarist who plays, "a Mediterranean sound mixing the folkloric styles of Greek, Spanish and Latin music with pop sensibilities." Born in Toronto, Canada, he is the son of Greek immigrants, George & Freda Simtikidis, of Kastoria, Greece. His albums Pavlo and Fantasia certified Gold in Canada, and album Fantasia was nominated in 2001 for a JUNO Award (Canadian Grammy) for Best Instrumental Album.

His next recording project Trifecta was released in 2009 in collaboration with Oscar Lopez and Rik Emmett (lead guitarist from rock group, Triumph) was nominated in 2010 for a JUNO Award (Canadian Grammy) for Instrumental Album of The Year.

Pavlo has sold more than a 500,000 records.

== Awards and nominations ==
Pavlo awards and nominations
Awards and nominations
Award	Wins	Nominations
Juno	0	2

Totals (Note: Certain award groups do not simply award one winner. They acknowledge several different recipients, have runners-up, and have third place. Since this is a specific recognition and is different from losing an award, runner-up mentions are considered wins in this award tally. For simplification and to avoid errors, each award in this list has been presumed to have had a prior nomination.)
- Wins: 0
- Nominations: 2

Juno Awards

The Juno Awards is a Canadian awards ceremony presented annually by the Canadian Academy of Recording Arts and Sciences. Pavlo received 2 nominations.

Year	Nominee / work	Award	Result
2001	Fantasia	Best Instrumental Album	Nominated
2010	Trifecta (Pavlo, Rik Emmett, Oscar Lopez)	Instrumental Album of the Year	Nominated

Juno Awards Artist Summary Pavlo

== Music Canada Gold and Platinum Certification Awards Certifications ==
=== Certified albums ===
Pavlo (1998) Certified: Gold

Fantasia (2000) Certified: Gold

Music Canada Gold/Platinum Artist Summary Pavlo

== Career ==
Pavlo's career is marked by a series of impressive achievements that highlight his influence and success in the world of instrumental music. His PBS special "Pavlo: Mediterranean Nights" aired nationally in both Canada and the U.S., broadcast on Bravo, CBC Bold, and PBS. He has received two Juno Award nominations for Best Instrumental Album of the Year—first for Fantasia in 2000 and again for Trifecta in 2010, the latter being a collaborative project with two-time Juno winner Oscar Lopez and Rock and Roll Hall of Famer Rik Emmett of the band Triumph. The trio composed all original songs for the album and embarked on a national sold-out tour.

Performing an average of 150 concerts per year, Pavlo has sold over half a million records worldwide and earned two gold albums for Fantasia and Pavlo. In 2001, he was selected to perform for His Royal Highness Prince Charles.

In 2002, he won a lawsuit against R&B artists R. Kelly and Jay-Z, who had sampled his melody from Fantasia in their Top 10 hit "Fiesta." The court recognized that Pavlo’s original guitar work was used 27 times in the track, and he now shares publishing rights as a credited co-writer.

Among his many accolades, Pavlo was named World Artist of the Year in 2005 and reached the Billboard Top 10 in May of the same year. He was recognized as Touring Artist of the Year in 2006 and headlined the Montreal Jazz Festival main stage before a crowd of over 20,000. He was also honored as “Greek Man of the Year” by the Top Choice Awards in both 2006 and 2007 and received a 2007 nomination for Smooth Jazz Guitarist of the Year. His music has been featured in a variety of film and television productions, including So You Think You Can Dance, Marine Life (starring Cybill Shepherd), CTV’s Eleventh Hour, Just Cause, The L Word, and The Chris Isaak Show.

In addition to his musical accomplishments, Pavlo launched his own line of nylon-string acoustic guitars, the “Pavlo Signature Series,” which is sold online and across Canada. Known for his generosity and connection with audiences, Pavlo famously gives away his guitar to one lucky audience member at every concert, a gesture that has become one of his trademarks.

== Discography ==
=== Studio albums ===
Title	Album details	Certifications	Nominations/Awards
Pavlo	Released: 1998; Label: Sleeping Giant Music (#SGM 01)	CAN: Gold	
Fantasia	Released: 2000; Label: Sleeping Giant Music (#SGM 02)	CAN: Gold	Nominated for a Juno Award for Best Instrumental Album
I Feel Love Again	Released: 2002; Label: Sleeping Giant Music (#SGM 03)		
Frostbite: Music for the Holidays	Released: 2003; Label: Sleeping Giant Music (#SGM 04)		
Mediterranean Lounge	Type: Remix album; Released: 2004; Label: Sleeping Giant Music (#SGM 07)		
Irresistible	Released: 2006; Label: Sleeping Giant Music (#SGM 08)		
Live at Massey Hall	Type: Live album; Released: 2007; Label: Sleeping Giant Music (#SGM 09)		
Mediterranean Nights	Type: Live album; Released: 2008; Label: Hejaz Entertainment (#HEJ-01)		
Trifecta (Pavlo, Rik Emmett, Oscar Lopez)	Released: 2009; Label: P.R.O. (#PRO-001)		Nominated for a Juno Award for Instrumental Album of the Year
Six String Blvd	Released: 2011; Label: Hejaz Entertainment (#HEJ-10)		
Guitarradas (Pavlo & Remigio)	Released: 2015; Label: Hejaz Entertainment		
Live in Kastoria	Type: Live album; Released: 2016; Label: Hejaz Entertainment		
Live in Guadalajara	Type: Live album; Released: 2019; Label: Hejaz Entertainment		
Together	Released: 2019; Label: Hejaz Entertainment		
Santorini	Released: 2022; Label: Hejaz Entertainment		

=== Video albums ===
Title	Album details	Certifications	Nominations/Awards
Mediterranean Nights	Released: 2008; Label: Hejaz Entertainment (#HEJDVD01); Formats: DVD		
Live in Kastoria	Released: 2016; Label: Hejaz Entertainment; Formats: DVD		

== Other Appearances ==
- Vasyl Popadiuk – III (2004) (Produced by Pavlo, written by Pavlo & Konstantine)
- Konstantine – Mediterranean Rendezvous (2004)

== Other Compilation Appearances ==
- Tabu: Mondo Flamenco (2001) (Narada)
- Camino Latino / Latin Journey – Liona Maria Boyd (2002) (Moston)
- Guitar Greats: The Best of New Flamenco – Volume II (2002) (Baja/TSR Records)
- Barcelona: Music Celebrating the Flavors of the World (2004) (Williams Sonoma)
- The World of the Spanish Guitar Vol. 1 (2011) (Higher Octave Music)
- Guitar Greats: The Best of New Flamenco – Volume III (2013) (Baja/TSR Records)

== See also ==
- New Flamenco
- Flamenco rumba
- Oscar Lopez
- Rik Emmett
