= Trifecta (disambiguation) =

A trifecta is a type of horse racing bet.

Trifecta may also refer to:

- Trifecta (album), a 2009 album by Pavlo, Rik Emmett, and Oscar Lopez
- "Trifecta" (Judge Dredd story), published in the comic 2000 AD in 2012
- Government trifecta, in which the same political party controls the executive branch and both chambers of the legislative branch
- Basketball Trifecta, another name for the Triple Crown achievement in American basketball

== See also ==
- The Trifecta, television sports show broadcast by ESPN
- Trifecta Entertainment & Media, a production company established by former Metro-Goldwyn-Mayer Television executives
- Trifekta, a defunct Australia based record label
