= James Keelaghan =

Canadian folk singer-songwriter (born 1959)

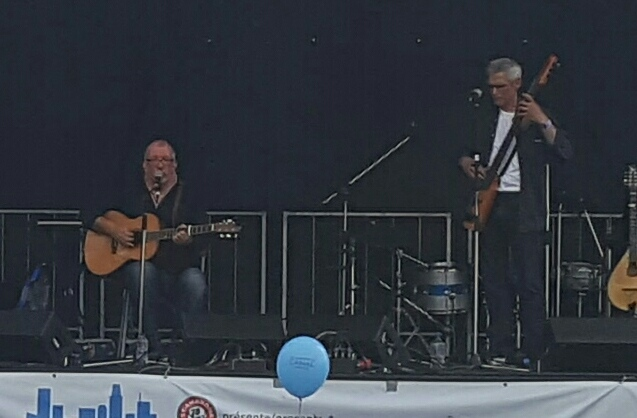
- Keelaghan (left) performing in Montreal in 2017

Background information
- Born: October 28, 1959 (age 66); Calgary, Alberta, Canada
- Genres: Folk, roots revival
- Occupations: Musician, songwriter, producer
- Instruments: Vocals, guitar
- Labels: Green Linnet, Jericho Beach, Tranquilla, Borealis
- Member of: Compadres
- Website: keelaghan.com

James Keelaghan (born October 28, 1959) is a Canadian folk singer-songwriter. Born in Calgary, Alberta, Keelaghan is now based in Perth, Ontario. Many of the lyrics in his songs display a concern about social problems and justice in society. Examples of such themes include "Kiri's Piano", about the internment of Japanese Canadians, and "October 70", about the FLQ crisis, inspired by events and figures in Canadian history. Some of his songs concern tragic historical events, such as "Fires of Calais," about the 1940 Dunkirk evacuation of Allied troops during World War II, and "Cold Missouri Waters," about the Mann Gulch fire of 1949. Keelaghan's lilting baritone voice, driving rhythm guitar, and a sense of scene and narrative result in his ability to bridge traditional folk music with roots revival and Celtic music.

== Biography and career ==
Keelaghan studied history at the University of Calgary and two of his influences there were Drs. Margaret J. Osler and Sheldon Silverman. With an international following in Australia and England, Keelaghan plays a wide variety of venues from large festivals and concert halls to intimate folk clubs venues and often invites the audience for a beer after his performance.

At the 1990 Northern Lights Festival Boréal, Keelaghan and guitarist Oscar Lopez participated in a collaborative workshop exploring the fusion of Celtic and Latin music. The duo would later collaborate on two albums, Compadres and ¿Buddy Where You Been?, further exploring that theme.

In 1994, he won the Juno Award for Roots & Traditional Album of the Year for My Skies.

In 2003, Keelaghan won first prize (Folk Category) of the 8th Annual USA Songwriting Competition.

His song "Cold Missouri Waters" was covered by the band Cry Cry Cry in 1998. His songs have also included some by famed folk musicians. They include Roy Bailey and Garnet Rogers.

Frequent guest musicians on his albums include Stephen Fearing and Hugh McMillan of Spirit of the West. His 2009 CD, House of Cards, produced by Keelaghan, is a collection of ten new original songs, some co-written with Karine Polwart, David Francey and others. The album received critical praise both in Canada and abroad. His 2022 album Second-Hand includes songs co-written with Catherine MacLellan, Lynn Miles, J.D. Edwards, Cara Luft, and Dave Gunning.

Since 2011, Keelaghan has been the Artistic Director of the Summerfolk Music and Crafts Festival in Owen Sound.

In August 2025, Keelaghan taught Songwriting, Storytelling in Song and Performance at the five-day Celtic College in Goderich Ontario.

== Discography ==
- Timelines (1987)
- Small Rebellions (1990)
- My Skies (1993)
- A Recent Future (1995)
- Compadres (1997) (James Keelaghan, Oscar Lopez) Nominated for a Juno Award for Best Roots & Traditional Album – Group
- Road (1999)
- Home (2001)
- Then Again (2004)
- A Few Simple Verses (2006)
- ¿Buddy Where You Been? (2007) (Compadres – James Keelaghan, Oscar Lopez) Nominated for a Juno Award for Roots & Traditional Album of the Year: Group
- House of Cards (2009)
- History: The First 25 Years (CD and DVD) (2013)
- Second-Hand (2022)
