= Summer Snow (TV series) =

- Starring: Tsuyoshi Domoto; Ryōko Hirosue; Tsubasa Imai; Ikewaki Chizuru; Shunsuke Nakamura; Kadono Takuzo; Hideko Hara; Shun Oguri
- Country of origin: Japan
- Original language: Japanese
- No. of seasons: 1
- No. of episodes: 11

Production
- Production company: TBS

Original release
- Network: JNN (TBS)
- Release: July 7 – September 15, 2000

Summer Snow (Japanese: サマー・スノー 夏之雪) is a Japanese television drama that was broadcast from July 7 to September 15, 2000, on TBS. It is a love story between a young man who has been forced to grow up too quickly, and a young woman with an activity-restricting ailment. The title refers to marine snow, which the two promise to see together one day. The series comprises eleven episodes.

== Summary ==
Natsuo (Domoto Tsuyoshi) has been looking after his younger brother Jun and sister Chika since the death of their parents. He has also been running the family bicycle shop. Yuki (Hirosue Ryōko) becomes the only person in the world in whom he can confide. For Yuki, Natsuo becomes the catalyst that has her trying to break out of her cocoon.

== Cast ==
Info.

- Tsuyoshi Domoto – Natsuo Shinoda
- Ryōko Hirosue – Yuki Katase
- Tsubasa Imai – Hiroto Suetsugu
- Ikewaki Chizuru – Chika Shinoda
- Shunsuke Nakamura – Seiji Tachibana
- Kadono Takuzo – Shogo Katase
- Hideko Hara – Miyako Sakurai
- Shun Oguri – Jun Shinoda

== Episodes ==
| No. | Title | Directed by | Written by | Original release date | Viewers (millions) |
|---|---|---|---|---|---|
| 1 | To father in heaven Transliteration: "Tengoku no oyaji e" (Japanese: 天国の親父へ) | Unknown | Unknown | 7 July 2000 | N/A |
Natsuo Shinoda takes care of his younger siblings, Jun, who is deaf and uses a hearing aid, and Chika, who takes care of the home, and the family bicycle store after the death of their parents. One day, Natsuno is teaching a boy to ride a bicycle, when he collides with Yuki, a newcomer working at a local credit union, which Natsuno learns is the one he does business with. Yuki, who lives with his detective father, Shogo, was diagnosed with myocardial enlargement at the age of 5 and has been battling this chronic disease ever since. Jun goes to meet a woman he met through e-mail, but gets hurt because of him not revealing his need for a hearing aid. Natsuno, angry, goes to look for the woman.
| 2 | Crybaby big brother Transliteration: "Nakimushi aniki" (Japanese: 泣き虫アニキ) | TBD | TBD | 2000 | TBD |
Jun misheard the name of the woman, and when Natsuno went to her, he thought that it was Yuki, but in reality it had been her co-worker, Misa. Natsuno apologizes to Yuki for the confusion, and then tells her about Jun's hearing problem and his hobby of diving. Jun's teacher calls Natsuno regarding Jun's future studies. Jun has chosen to be a teacher, but Natsuno is against it. Jun says he wants to prove himself precisely because of his discapacity. Natsuno blames himself for Jun's hearing loss, because 14 years before he chose to play instead of take care of him. Natsuno goes to the beach alone and there he meets Yuki. He tells her about what happened with Jun, and Yuki tells him she understands, because she also has had to postpone her dreams. Since the death of her mother, when she was a little girl, she has had to take care of her father, without complaining, as not to worry him. Something happens to Chika.
| 3 | Pregnant 17-year-old Transliteration: "17-Sai no ninshin" (Japanese: 17歳の妊娠) | TBD | TBD | 2000 | TBD |
Natsuno invites Yuki diving, unaware that it could kill her. She doesn't tell him, since she wants to have an adventure with him. Natsuno takes her to a pool course, but Yuki's legs cramp before entering the pool. Meanwhile, his younger sister, Chika finds out that she is pregnant with Hiroto's child. Raising a child for two high school students is nearly impossible, so they decide to have an abortion. To raise the money for it, Hiroto is persuaded by an old friend to commit a purse snatching theft.
| 4 | The best life in the world Transliteration: "Sekai de ichiban no inochi" (Japanese: 世界で一番の命) | TBD | TBD | 2000 | TBD |
Natsuo learns about Chika's pregnancy and is against her keeping it, but Chika wants to. He is thinking about the hardships she could have if she keeps it. Natsuo volunteers with Yuki at the hospital that Yuki has been a patient of. He meets children battling incurable diseases, and thinks about the importance of life when he sees that there are people who want to live a long life, but cannot. After that, Natsuno chooses to protect Chika and the unborn child. However, Hiroto, the child's father, hasn't even told his own parents about Chika or her pregnancy. At the hospital, doctors are talking about going to the U.S. to study about organ transplantation, with Yuki being selected as a candidate for the trials.
| 5 | Lover's Secret; Transliteration: "Koibito no himitsu" (Japanese: 恋人の秘密) | TBD | TBD | 2000 | TBD |
Hiroto is living with the Shinodas. He accepts Natsuo's conditions and gives his best to make do. Natsuo heads to the beach with Yuki, but Jun wants to go too. Yuki is chosen for the transplant, but it means having to leave Natsuo. Yuki visits the Shinodas at home, for which Natsuo has prepared a hot pot. His reason for doing it: "only when people who have just met share the same pot can a relationship develop". As he accompanies her back to her place, Natsuo gives Yuki a pearl necklace. Yuki has kept her relationship with Natsuo a secret from her father. When Shogo learns about it, he is against it. He believes it is a risk to her life.
| 6 | I'm no longer with you Transliteration: "Omae to hamou" (Japanese: オマエとはもう) | TBD | TBD | 2000 | TBD |
When Natsuo finds out about Yuki's illness, Yuki's father begs him to end their relationship. Natsuo decides to break up with Yuki's due to her health, which is overworked when she's with him, and begins to purposely avoid Yuki. Hiroto is shocked by Natsuo's lack of energy. Chika and Jun, worried about their brother, call Yuki. When Yuki comes to visit him in the hospital, Natsuo deliberately acts cold towards her and brings up the idea of breaking up.
| 7 | Please let me go out with you Transliteration: "Otsukiai sasete kudasai" (Japanese: おつきあい させてください) | TBD | TBD | 2000 | TBD |
Jun and Chika are helping Natsuo get ready. Natsuo is meeting with Shogo to ask for his formal approval for a relationship with Yuki. Hiroto is being blackmailed by a former theft partner, who claims he was an accomplice. He gets the money from the Shinodas savings, and is caught by Jun and Chika, who keep it from Natsuo. Natsuo and Yuki go on a date that was arranged by Yuki and Sakurai as a scheme to make Shogo and Natsuo meet. The blackmailers' harassment is getting worse. They go to the bicycle store and have an altercation there. When Natsuo returns to the store, he finds the store in disarray and Hiroto's face beaten up. Natsuo learns the truth of what happened.
| 8 | Honesty is the best Transliteration: "Shōjiki ga ichiban" (Japanese: 正直が一番) | TBD | TBD | 2000 | TBD |
Jun believes that Hiroto is involved in an attack on a pachinko parlor, and goes there to try to stop him. However, Hiroto is nowhere to be found. Hiroto has gone to the police to turn himself in for attempted theft. After hearing from Hiroto about the attack plan, the police raid it. Jun doesn't understand what's going on. During a scuffle with the delinquents, Jun's hearing aid falls off. Mistaken for one of the delinquents, Jun is taken away by the police. Natsuo receives the call about the event and rushes to the police station. After being questioned by Shogo and Detective Morimoto, Jun is cleared. Days later, Natsuo believes that the others have forgotten his birthday. Natsuo receives a call from Jun's school. The recommendation for university has been cancelled and there is a possibility of expulsion. Natsuo learns that the police still are considering Jun an accomplice. Shogo goes to visit them, then tells the Shinodas that he is unable to do anything regarding the police, leaving Natsuo to face the problem alone.
| 9 | You absolutely can't die Transliteration: "Zettai shinja dameda" (Japanese: 絶対死んじゃダメだ) | TBD | TBD | 2000 | TBD |
Natsuo continues caring for Yuki's wellbeing, and tries not to overwhelm her. Yuki's dream to go to the beach is sidetracked and ends in the aquarium. Yuki gets to her limit, feeling that she is becoming a burden for Natsuo. When Natsuo returns homa, he finds Hiroto and Chika fighting, and Jun watching. Natsuo goes to stop them and he preaches to Chika about taking care of her, when he realizes that he has been treating Yuki the same way. He feels remorse for his actions, and retreats, depressed. Yuki finishes her treatment, and feeling there is nothing else to do, she begs Natsuo to take her to the beach.
| 10 | Eternal Farewell; Transliteration: "Eien no wakare" (Japanese: 永遠の別れ) | TBD | TBD | 2000 | TBD |
Yuki has to be hospitalized. The night before, she stays with the Shinodas, for which all clean and prepare the house for her. That night, Yuki is dressed with Natsuo's mother's yukata for Tsukimi. Natsuo senses how Yuki's life force is extinguishing. He decides to sleep with her. The others watch over them. When Yuki tells Natsuo that she wants to see the moon again the following year, Natsuo does not answer. The day of Yuki's hospitalization, Natsuo talks with Tachibana. Tachibana and her father try to convince Yuki to have a second transplant, but Yuki, besides knowing that the operation would be too expensive and that all the costs would be covered by Tachibana, considers that she would not want to have a future with him, because she loves Natsuo. However, Natsuo tells her to go with Tachibana to the United States.
| 11 | Miracle of Love; Transliteration: "Ai no kiseki" (Japanese: 愛の奇跡) | TBD | TBD | 2000 | TBD |
Yuki is on her way to the airport, when she suffers a seizure, so she is taken to the hospital. Having decided to go to the States, she receives a call that hangs up immediately. She somehow felt that it was Natsuo, so she decides to return to him, but is hit by another seizure. Thinking that Yuki has left, Hiroto tries to console Natsuo telling him that there are other women, but gets preached on by Natsuo. They receive a call. It is someone informing them that Yuki is in the hospital. Yuki was clutching a torn pearl necklace when Natsuo arrives. Shogo apologizes for his attitude and his forceful separation of the couple. Natsuo returns home brokenhearted. Hiroto offers to take care of the store and Jun and Chika of the home. Natsuo does not want to be a burden, but Chika tells him that it is times like this he should rely on the others. Hiroto tells him to go to Yuki.

== Songs and theme songs ==
- "Natsuno Osama" by KinKi Kids
- "Summer Snow" by Sissel and Zamfir
- "Seven Angels" by Sissel

=== Summer Snow (song) ===
"Summer Snow"

Single by Sissel Kyrkjebø, Zamfir

from the album The Best of Sissel
- Released: 2000
- Genre: Traditional, folk, ballad
- Length: 5:09
- Label: Mercury
- Producer: Akira Senju

Sissel Kyrkjebø, Zamfir singles chronology
| "Prince Igor" (1997) | "Summer Snow" (2000) | "Where the Lost Ones Go" (2001) |

"Summer Snow" was released as a single by the Norwegian soprano Sissel Kyrkjebø and Zamfir in 2000. It is based on the traditional song "The Water Is Wide". The single also includes the song "Seven Angels" with Sissel and Zamfir.
