= Eli Kassner =

Canadian musical artist (1924–2018)

- photo: Milan Chvostek

Background information
- Born: 27 May 1924; Vienna, Austria
- Died: 23 August 2018 (aged 94) Toronto, Ontario, Canada
- Genre: Classical
- Occupations: Teacher, musician
- Instrument: Guitar

Eli Kassner, CM (27 May 1924 – 23 August 2018) was a Canadian classical guitar teacher and musician.

Eli Kassner studied guitar in Vienna and Israel before moving to Canada in 1951. He also studied in the United States, Israel, and in Spain, under the great virtuoso classical guitarist, Andrés Segovia. He performed until 1967.

In 1956, he founded the Guitar Society of Toronto. He was its president from 1960 to 1966 and artistic director from 1970 to 2008. In 1967, he established the Eli Kassner Guitar Academy.

He established the guitar program at the University of Toronto and The Royal Conservatory of Music in Toronto (RCMT) in 1959 and started the University of Toronto Guitar Ensemble in 1978.

In the 1970s, Kassner became interested in microphotography, and worked as a composer and performer for the CBC Television series The Lively Arts and The Nature of Things.

Eli Kassner was awarded an honorary doctorate from Carleton University and was also inducted into the Guitar Foundation of America's Hall of Fame. In 2009, the Guitar Society of Toronto, honored Eli Kassner with a lifetime 'Artistic Director Emeritus' appointment.

In 2016, he was appointed as a Member of the Order of Canada.

== Notable students ==
- Liona Boyd
- Annabelle Chvostek
- Jesse Cook
- Atom Egoyan
- Norbert Kraft
- Pavlo Simtikidis
- Timothy Phelan

== Bibliography ==
- Smith, Harold. "Eli Kassner: a biography" Guitar Canada, vol 2, Spring 1989
- Levy, Harold. "The road to respect", ibid
- Blackadar, Bruce. "Ovation for a guitar master", Toronto Star, 20 May 1989
