= Pugs and Crows =

Canadian instrumental music group

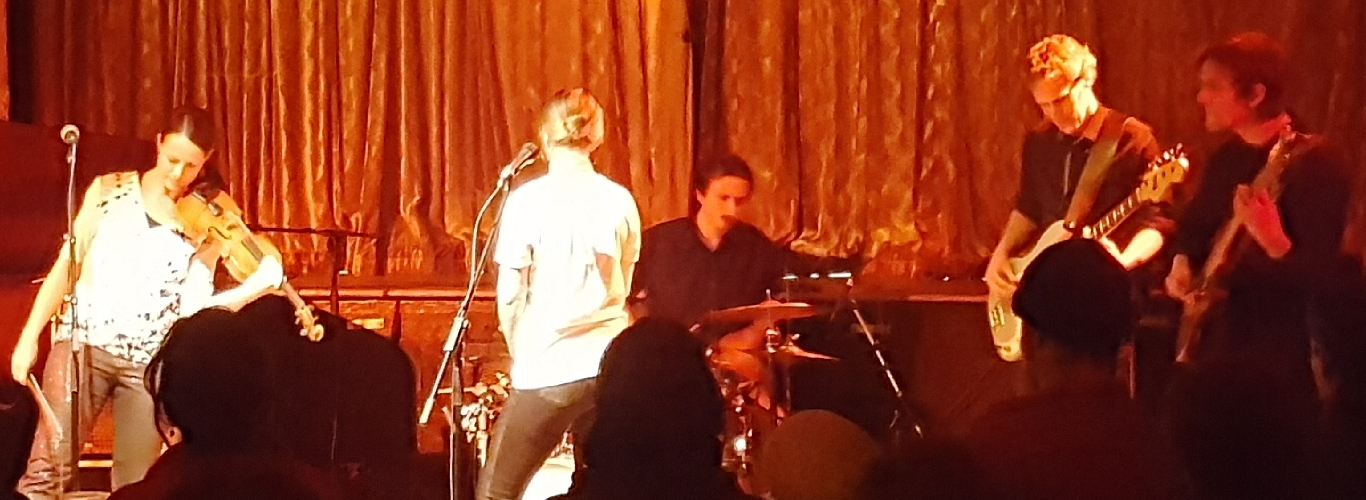
Pugs and Crows in 2019

Pugs and Crows are a Canadian instrumental music group from Vancouver, British Columbia. They are most noted for winning the Juno Award for Instrumental Album of the Year at the Juno Awards of 2013, for their album Fantastic Pictures.

The band consists of guitarists Cole Schmidt and Tony Wilson, violinist Meredith Bates, pianist Catherine Toren, bassist Russell Sholberg and drummer Ben Brown.

== History ==
Pugs and Crows released their debut album Slum Towers in 2009, followed by Fantastic Pictures in 2012.

The band performed at the Montreal Jazz Festival in 2013. Their third album, Everyone Knows Everyone, with Tony Wilson, followed in 2015. The album topped the !earshot National Jazz Chart in February 2016. The band won the Western Canadian Music Award for Instrumental Artist of the Year in 2016.

In 2018, the band performed at the Arts on the Fly Festival in Horsefly, British Columbia.
