= Zamfirescu =

Zamfirescu is a Romanian surname. Notable people with the surname include:

- Duiliu Zamfirescu (1858–1922), novelist, poet, short story writer, lawyer, nationalist politician, journalist, diplomat
- Florin Zamfirescu (born 1949), theatre and film actor and director
- George Mihail Zamfirescu (1898–1939), theatre director and playwright
- Elisa Leonida Zamfirescu (1887–1973), an early woman engineer
- Mihail Zamphirescu (1838–1878), poet

== See also ==
- Zamfir
- Zamfirești (disambiguation)
