= Paul Lawrence Farber =

American historian (1944–2021)

- Born: March 7, 1944; New York, NY
- Died: November 28, 2021 (aged 77); Corvallis, OR
- Education: University of Pittsburgh (BS) Indiana University (PhD)
- Known for: History of Ornithology
- Scientific career
- Fields: History of Science
- Workplaces: Oregon State University

Paul Lawrence Farber (March 7, 1944 – November 28, 2021) was a professor of the history of science at Oregon State University. He wrote or edited eight books about the history of science as well as dozens of articles. He was an elected fellow of the American Association for the Advancement of Science.

Farber was born in New York City, his mother born to Jewish immigrants from Ukraine and his father born in a family of Latvian Jews. Farber grew up in Manhattan and then Uniontown, Pennsylvania. He took an interest in science and philosophy, tinkering with rockets and reading on science. He became interested in biology after attending a summer NSF school in Syracuse while in high school and joined the University of Pittsburgh in 1961, intending to study medicine, but after receiving a BS in zoology in 1965 he shifted to philosophy and the history of science at Indiana University. His master's thesis in 1968 was on "Buffon and Newton's Science", and his PhD in 1970 was on "Buffon's Concept of Species." He joined Oregon State University in 1970 and contributed works on the history of ornithology, species concepts, race, and ethics.

In 2010, he was elected president of the History of Science Society. Oregon State University's special collections hold Farber's personal papers.

Farber died at his home in Corvallis, Oregon, on November 28, 2021, from pancreatic cancer.

== Books ==
- The Emergence of Ornithology as a Scientific Discipline, 1760–1850. (Dordrecht: D. Reidel Publishing Co. 1982) ISBN 902771410X
- (as editor with Margaret J. Osler) Religion, Science, and Worldview: Essays in Honor of Richard S. Westfall. (Cambridge, England; New York, NY: Cambridge University Press 1985) ISBN 0-521-30452-0; Osler, Margaret J.; Farber, Paul Lawrence (August 22, 2002). 2002 pbk edition. Cambridge University Press. ISBN 0-521-52493-8.
- (coauthored with Mix, Michael C. and King, Keith I.) Biology: The Network of Life. (New York, NY: Harper Collins Publishers 1992.)
- Finding Order in Nature: The Naturalist Tradition from Linnaeus to E. O. Wilson. Baltimore, MD: The Johns Hopkins University Press 1994. ISBN 0-8018-6389-9; Farber, Paul Lawrence (July 10, 2000). 2000 pbk edition. JHU Press. ISBN 0-8018-6390-2.
- Discovering Birds: The Emergence of Ornithology as a Scientific Discipline, 1760–1850. (Baltimore, MD: The Johns Hopkins University Press 1997) ISBN 0801855373
- The Temptations of Evolutionary Ethics. (Berkeley, CA: University of California Press 1998) ISBN 0-520-21369-6
- (coauthored with Cravens, Hamilton) Race and Science: Scientific Challenges to Racism in Modern America. (Corvallis, OR: Oregon State University Press 2009); Hamilton Cravens (1938–2015) was a professor of history at Iowa State University for 42 years.
- Mixing Races: From Scientific Racism to Modern Evolutionary Ideas. (Baltimore, Md: The Johns Hopkins University Press 2011)
