= Patrick Norman (singer) =

Canadian singer

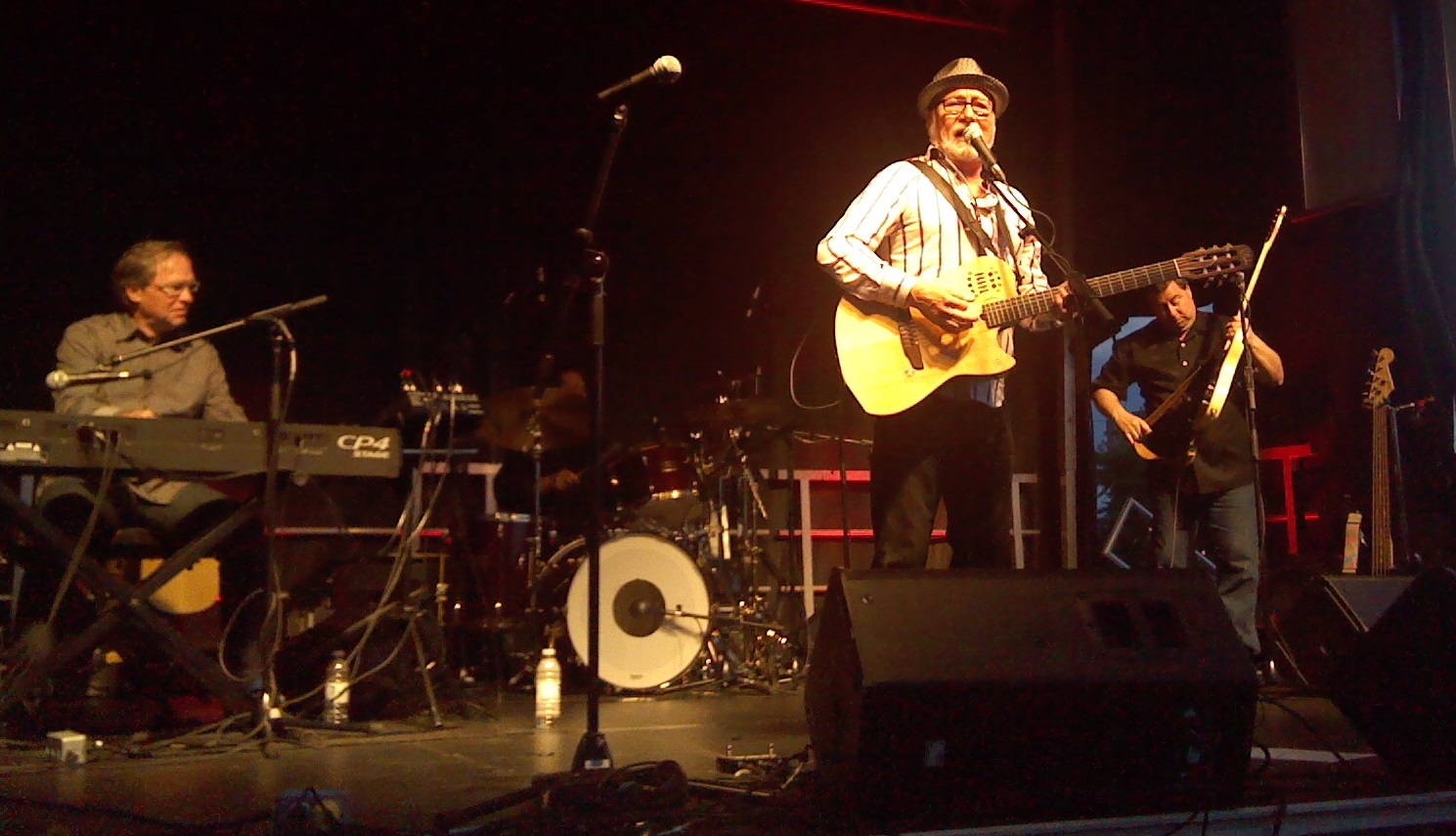

Background information
- Born: Yvon Éthier; September 10, 1946 (age 79); Montreal, Quebec, Canada
- Genres: Country music
- Years active: 1954–present

Yvon Éthier better known as Patrick Norman CM (born September 10, 1946) is a Canadian country musician. He sings both in French and English and has had hits in Quebec and in the rest of Canada.

In 1970, Norman's single "Love is All" appeared on the RPM Top 50 Canadian Chart.

His song, "Let's Try Once More", was nominated for a 1978 Juno Award in the Juno Award for Single of the Year category. He was nominated for Juno Award for Country Recording of the Year at the 1989 Juno Award.

In 2017, he was appointed to the Order Of Canada for "his contributions to Quebec’s country music scene [...] and for his dedication to numerous charitable causes".

== Awards and nominations ==
Juno Awards

- 1978: Nomination for "Best Selling Single" for "Let's Try Once More"

Félix Awards (ADISQ Gala)

- 1982: Nomination for "Best Album - Western"
- 1985: Nomination for "Best Album - Country-western"
- 1987: Winner of "Best Male Singer"
- 1987: Winner of "Best Selling Album of the Year" for Quand on est en amour
- 1988: Nomination for "Best English Album - pop-rock"
- 1989: Winner for "Best Album - Country" for Soyons heureux
- 1991: Nomination for "Best Album - Pop"
- 1993: Nomination for "Best Album - Pop"
- 1994: Nomination for "Best Artiste - Language other than French"
- 1997: Nomination for "Best Album - Instrumental"
- 1998: Nomination for "Best Live Act"
- 2001: Nomination for "Best Album - Contemporary Folk"
- 2002: Nomination for "Best Album - Pop"
- 2005: Nomination for "Best Live Act"
- 2007: Nomination for "Best DVD"
- 2007: Receiver of "Félix Hommage" (Life Achievement tribute award)

Metrostar

- 1986: Winner of "Best Song of the Year" for "Quand on est en amour"
- 1986: Winner of "Best Singer"
- 1987: Winner of "Best Singer"

Artis Award

- 1988: Artis trophy for "Best Song of the Year" for "Quand on est en amour"

SOCAN

- 2012: Award for Excellence
- 2012: Lifetime Achievement Award

== Discography ==
=== Albums ===
- 1972: Patrick Norman
- 1974: Toi qui rêves
- 1976: Textures
- 1978: Sweet Sweet Lady
- 1980: On part au soleil
- 1982: Hommage à Kenny Rogers
- 1984: Quand on est amour
- 1987: 12 grands succès (compilation)
- 1987: Only Love Sets You Free
- 1988: Soyons heureux
- 1990: Passion vaudou
- 1992: Noël sans faim
- 1994: The Christmas Album
- 1994: Whispering Shadows
- 1995: Chez-moi
- 1996: Les grands succès (compilation)
- 1997: Guitare
- 1997: Collection privée
- 1998: Country (joint album with Renée Martel)
- 1998: Un joyeux Noël tout en chansons (compilation)
- 1999: 10 grands succès (compilation)
- 2000: Patrick Norman
- 2001: Les plus belles chansons de mariage
- 2002/2003: Soirée intime
- 2004: Simplement Patrick Norman
- 2007: Tu peux frapper à ma porte
- 2007: Comment le dire...
- 2008: Les plus belles voix country de chez-nous (compilation jointly with Richard Huet and André Breton)
- 2008: Plaisirs de Noël
- 2010: Where I Come From
- 2011: L'amour n'a pas d'addresse
- 2016: Nous (with Renée Martel)

=== Singles ===
- 1966: Je pleure sous la pluie / Tu me reviendras, Cindy
- 1970: Notre amour / Que le temps s'arrête
- 1970: Pour un instant d'amour / Donne-moi ton cœur
- 1971: Je serai toujours ton ami / Instrumental
- 1972: On a toujours besoin d’amour / Je ne comprends rien
- 1972: Pour un instant d’amour / Laisse-moi rêver
- 1972: Mon cœur est à toi / Donne-moi ton cœur
- 1973: Mon cœur est à toi / On a toujours besoin d’amour
- 1973: D’où que tu viennes / Il n'y a que toi
- 1974: Quand tu me reviens / Toi qui rêves
- 1974: Free as the Wind / Welcome to My World
- 1974: Papillon / Toi qui rêves
- 1974: Papillon / Free As The Wind
- 1974: Papillon / Mon pays
- 1974: Salut les amis / Quand le blé sera levé
- 1974: Love Is All / That's Part of Being Your Man
- 1975: Tu n’es plus là / Tout comme avant
- 1976: C'est la saison / Hello Mom
- 1976: You've Lost That Loving Feeling / Baby You Can Count On Me
- 1977: Let's Try Once Again / Instrumental (with the Black Light Orchestra)
- 1977: Loving You / Instrumental
- 1978: I Remember You / Sweet, Sweet Lady
- 1978: Paradise / Bring Back The Love
- 1978: L'amour de ma vie / La mélodie du printemps
- 1979: Je n'ai jamais aimé comme je t’aime / Vieillir ensemble
- 1979: Aiko Aiko / Que vais-je devenir
- 1980: Avant toi / On part au soleil
- 1980: Mon vieux copain / Je serai toujours là
- 1982: Lady / Amants de la nuit
- 1982: Crois en l’amour / T'es sûrement fatigué
- 1983: Mais tu sais je t'aime / Qui est gagnant
- 1983: C'est pour toi que je chante / Instrumental
- 1984: Quand on est en amour
- 1984: Nous (with Renée Martel) / Instrumental
- 1985: Rêves fous / L'hirondelle
- 1985: Toi le soleil de ma vie / Vivre
- 1986: Quand on est en amour / L'amour ensemble
- 1987: Vivre
- 1987: Only Love Sets You Free / Instrumental
- 1987: L'amour ensemble / Instrumental
- 1987: True Love Will Find A Way / Instrumental
- 1988: Tu n'es plus là
- 1988: Two Shades Of Roses / Love's A Crazy Game
- 1988: J'ai besoin de toi
- 1988: I'd Rather Have You
- 1989: J'ai oublié de vivre
- 1989: Il pleut à mourir (with Marie-France Laurin)
- 1989: Heaven In Her Eyes
- 1989: Perce les nuages
- 1990: Elle s'en va

== Filmography ==
- 1985: South Bronx Heroes as William Szarka
- 2006: La véritable histoire du petit chaperon rouge - voice over
