= Óscar López (guitarist) =

Chilean-Canadian guitarist (born 1953)

Oscar Lopez
- Born: 1953 (age 72–73); Santiago, Chile
- Origin: Calgary, Alberta, Canada
- Genres: New Flamenco, Instrumental, Latin, Jazz, Folk, World
- Occupations: Musician, guitarist, composer
- Instruments: Guitar, vocals
- Years active: 1989–present
- Labels: Fantasy of Latin Strings, Jericho Beach Music, Narada, Centino Music, P.R.O.
- Website: https://oscarlopezofficial.com/

Oscar Lopez (born 1953) is a Chilean-Canadian guitarist, whose signature style blends Latin and jazz styles.

== Background ==
Lopez was born in Santiago, Chile, studying music through the University of Chile's youth music program. He moved to Canada in 1978, initially settling in Winnipeg, Manitoba before moving to Calgary, Alberta in 1981. He began pursuing music as a career, initially as an electric guitarist in a rock cover band before starting to perform as a Latin-style acoustic guitarist.

He was a regional finalist for Western Canada in the Montreal International Jazz Festival's national Concours de Jazz in 1987.

== Music career ==
He released his debut album Hola in 1989.

At the 1990 Northern Lights Festival Boréal, Lopez and singer-songwriter James Keelaghan met for the first time and began to explore the fusion of Celtic and Latin music. The duo undertook a number of tours together, and contributed as guest musicians on each other's solo albums before recording two Juno Award-nominated albums, Compadres (1997) and ¿Buddy Where You Been? (2007) as a duo.

At the Juno Awards of 1995, Lopez garnered his first nomination for Best Global Recording, for the album Dancing on the Moon Contigo.

He signed to Narada Records in 1997.

In 1998, Lopez co-produced Volcán: Tributo a José José, a tribute album dedicated to the iconic Mexican singer José José. He received a nomination for Best Instrumental Artist at the Juno Awards of 1998, the same year in which the album Compadres was nominated for Best Roots & Traditional Album – Group.

At the Juno Awards of 2002, Lopez won his first award, in the Best Instrumental Album category for Armando's Fire. He won a second Juno Award in the same category for Mi Destino/My Destiny at the Juno Awards of 2005. Around this time, however, Lopez took a break from performing for two years to deal with depression. As a result, Spirit of the West recorded a tribute song to Lopez, "Come Back Oscar", on their 2004 album Star Trails. On July 24 that year, Lopez appeared on stage with Spirit of the West at the Calgary Folk Music Festival to perform the song; the following year, he returned to the stage as the festival's headlining act.

After collaborating with Keelaghan on ¿Buddy Where You Been?, which was again a Juno Award nominee for Best Instrumental Album at the Juno Awards of 2008, his next recording project was with Pavlo and Rik Emmett on the album Trifecta (2009). Credited as P.R.O., the trio toured North America in support of the CD, which was again a Juno Award nominee for Best Instrumental Album at the Juno Awards of 2010.

Lopez released his latest recording Apasionado on October 21, 2014 as an independent artist.

== Awards and nominations ==
| Year | Nominee / work | Award | Result |
|---|---|---|---|
| 1995 | Dancing On The Moon Contigo | Best Global Recording | Nominated |
| 1998 | Compadres (James Keelaghan & Oscar Lopez) | Best Roots & Traditional Album: Group | Nominated |
| 1998 | Oscar Lopez | Instrumental Artist(s) of the Year | Nominated |
| 2002 | Armando's Fire | Best Instrumental Album | Won |
| 2005 | Mi Destino/My Destiny | Instrumental Album of the Year | Won |
| 2008 | ¿Buddy, Where You Been? (Compadres – James Keelaghan & Oscar Lopez) | Roots & Traditional Album of the Year: Group | Nominated |
| 2010 | Trifecta (Pavlo, Rik Emmett, Oscar Lopez) | Instrumental Album of the Year | Nominated |

Other Awards

1999: Prairie Music Awards Winner Instrumentalist of the Year

2002: SOCAN Winner Hagood Hardy Jazz/Instrumental Award

== Discography ==
| Title | Album details | Nominations/Awards |
|---|---|---|
| Hola | Released: 1989; Label: Fantasy of Latin Strings; Formats: cassette | |
| Sueños | Released: 1991; Label: Fantasy of Latin Strings | |
| Dancing on the Moon Contigo | Released: 1994; Label: Socan (#FLS2); Formats: CD, cassette | Nominated for a Juno Award for Best Global Recording |
| Compadres (James Keelaghan, Oscar Lopez) | Released: 1997; Label: Jericho Beach Music (#JBM 9701-2) | Nominated for a Juno Award for Best Roots & Traditional Album – Group |
| Heat | Released: 1997; Label: Narada Productions (#ND-63040) | |
| Seduction | Released: 1998; Label: Narada Productions (#72438-46140-2-7) | |
| Armando's Fire | Released: 2000; Label: Narada Productions (#72438-49799-2-8) | Won a Juno Award for Best Instrumental Album |
| Flashback: The Best of Oscar Lopez | Type: Compilation album; Released: 2002; Label: Narada Productions (#72435-42521-2-9) | |
| My Destiny (Mi Destino) | Released: 2003; Label: Narada Productions (#72435-93645-2-0) | Won a Juno Award for Instrumental Album of the Year |
| ¿Buddy Where You Been? (Compadres – James Keelaghan, Oscar Lopez) | Released: 2007; Label: Centino Music | Nominated for a Juno Award for Roots & Traditional Album of the Year: Group |
| Trifecta (Pavlo, Rik Emmett, Oscar Lopez) | Released: 2009; Label: P.R.O. (#PRO-001) | Nominated for a Juno Award for Instrumental Album of the Year |
| Apasionado | Released: 2014; Label: Independent | |

=== Other compilation appearances ===
- Masters of Acoustic Guitar (1997) (Narada) (Track 5 – Classical Soul (Edit))
- Narada Smooth Jazz (1997) (Narada)
- Narada World A Global Vision (1997) (Narada)
- The Next Generation: Explore Our World (1997) (Narada)
- Gypsy Passion: New Flamenco (1997) (Narada)
- Gypsy Soul: New Flamenco (1998) (Narada)
- Stories (1998) (Narada) (Track 3 – Looking Back)
- Narada Film and Television Music Sampler (1998) (Narada)
- Narada Guitar: 15 Years of Collected Works (1998) (Narada)
- Obsession: New Flamenco Romance (1999) (Narada)
- Latino Christmas (1999) (Narada) (Track 2 – Happy Christmas, Track 6 – White Christmas, Track 9 – Little Town of Bethlehem)
- Nuevo Flamenco (1999) (Virgin France)
- Gypsy Fire (2000) (Narada)
- Global Transmissions (A World Music Sampler) (2000) (Narada)
- Narada Guitar 2: The Best of Two Decades (2000) (Narada)
- Guitar Greats: The Best of New Flamenco – Volume I (2000) (Baja/TSR Records)
- Tabu: Mondo Flamenco (2001) (Narada)
- Guitar Greats: The Best of New Flamenco – Volume II (2002) (Baja/TSR Records)
- Best of Narada New Flamenco Guitar (2003) (Narada)
- The Metropolitan Museum of Art: A Latin Christmas (2005) (EMI Music/Metropolitan Museum of Art) (Track 1 – Happy Christmas, Track 13 – White Christmas)
- The World of the Spanish Guitar Vol. 1 (2011) (Higher Octave Music)
- Guitar Greats: The Best of New Flamenco – Volume III (2013) (Baja/TSR Records)
