= Eric Bearclaw =

Eric Bearclaw is the stage name of Eric Barraclough, a Canadian guitarist from Cedar, British Columbia. He is most noted for his 2023 album Distant Places, which received a Juno Award nomination for Instrumental Album of the Year at the Juno Awards of 2025.

His style blends classical guitar with world music elements.

== Discography ==
- Strains - 2015
- Distant Places - 2023
