= Robert Michaels =

Canadian musician

- Birth name: Roberto Michele Buttarazzi
- Born: Toronto, Ontario, Canada
- Origin: Toronto, Ontario, Canada
- Genres: New Flamenco, instrumental, Latin, jazz, world
- Occupation(s): Musician, guitarist, composer
- Instrument(s): Guitar, vocals
- Years active: 1996–present
- Labels: Melaby Music
- Website: robertmichaels.com

Roberto Michele Buttarazzi, better known as Robert Michaels, is a Canadian musician born in Toronto, Canada who spent part of his childhood in Italy.

Michaels is a gold and platinum-selling recording artist, guitarist, and vocalist. He has received multiple Juno Award nominations and won the Juno Award for Instrumental Album of the Year in 2003 for Allegro.

His debut album, Paradiso, released in 1997, was nominated for a Juno Award and achieved Platinum certification, selling more than 100,000 copies in Canada.

In 1998, Michaels was nominated for a Juno Award for Instrumental Artist(s) of the Year. His album Utopia was nominated for Best Instrumental Album in 2000 for a Juno Award, and his next album, Allegro won the 2003 Juno Award for Instrumental Album of the Year.

Michaels' album Via Italia was released in 2013.

Fletcher connected the Wild Strawberries band with German electronic dance producer and DJ André Tanneberger (stage name ATB). Tanneberger produced a remix of the song, released as an ATB single re-titled "Let U Go." The single reached number 18 on the U.S. Billboard Hot Dance Music/Club Play charts and number 7 on the German Singles Chart.

== Awards and nominations ==
Robert Michaels awards and nominations
Awards and nominations
Award	Wins	Nominations
Juno	1	3

Totals (Note: Certain award groups do not simply award one winner. They acknowledge several different recipients, have runners-up, and have third place. Since this is a specific recognition and is different from losing an award, runner-up mentions are considered wins in this award tally. For simplification and to avoid errors, each award in this list has been presumed to have had a prior nomination.)
- Wins: 1
- Nominations: 3

Juno Awards

Michaels won the 2003 Juno Award for Instrumental Album of the Year and received 3 additional nominations.

Year	Nominee / work	Award	Result
1998	Robert Michaels	Instrumental Album of the Year	Nominated
2000	Utopia	Instrumental Album of the Year	Nominated
2003	Allegro	Instrumental Album of the Year	Won

== Music Canada Gold and Platinum Certification Awards Certifications ==
=== Certified albums ===
Paradiso (1996) Certified: Gold and Platinum

== Discography ==
Title	Album details	Certifications	Nominations/Awards
Paradiso	Released: 1996; Label: Melaby Music (#MP131-2)	CAN: Gold, Platinum	
Arizona	Released: 1997; Label: Melaby Music (#MP2 132)		
Utopia	Released: 1998; Label: Melaby Music		Nominated for a Juno Award for Best Instrumental Album
Allegro	Released: 2003; Label: Melaby Music		Won a Juno Award for Instrumental Album of the Year
Robert Michaels	Released: 2005; Label: Melaby Music		
The Spanish Guitar Collection	Type: Compilation album; Released: 2006; Label: Melaby Music (#2810)		
Cubamenco	Released: 2009; Label: Melaby Music		
Via Italia	Released: 2013; Label: Melaby Music		
Holiday Classics	Released: 2019; Label: Melaby Music		

== Other compilation appearances ==
- Guitar Music For Small Rooms (1997) (WEA)
- Guitar Music For Small Rooms 2 (2001) (WEA)
- Guitar Music For Small Rooms 3 (2004) (WEA)

== See also ==
- New Flamenco
- Flamenco rumba
