= Zamfirești =

Zamfireşti may refer to several villages in Romania:

- Zamfireşti, a village in Cepari Commune, Argeș County
- Zamfireşti, a village in Cotmeana Commune, Argeș County
- Zamfireşti, a village in Galbenu Commune, Brăila County

== See also ==
- Zamfir
- Zamfirescu (surname)
