= Black Light Orchestra =

Canadian disco band

- Origin: Montreal, Quebec, Canada
- Genres: Disco
- Years active: 1976-1980
- Label: RCA Records
- Members: Michel Daigle; Dominic Sciscente; Patrick Norman; Alan Rubin; Bob Babbitt; Charles Collins; George Young; Jon Stroll; Larry Washington; Michael Brecker; Michael Tschudin; Randy Brecker; Ray Knehnetsky; Stephen A. Love; Tom Malone; Tony Bell

Black Light Orchestra was a Canadian disco band, active in the late 1970s. The band's core members were producers Michel Daigle and Dominic Sciscente, and singer Patrick Norman, along with several studio collaborators.

== History ==
In 1977, the band released the album, Once Upon a Time..., and the title track appeared on the RPM Adult Contemporary chart and briefly on the Top Singles chart. Their self-titled 1978 album was listed among the RPM Top 100 Albums in 1978.

The group released another album, This Time, in 1979. The band's best known dance club singles at this time were "Touch Me Take Me" and "Morricone (A Man and His Harmonica)", a disco remix of Ennio Morricone's soundtrack to the film Once Upon a Time in the West.

The band was signed to RCA Canada.

They garnered three Juno Award nominations over the course of their career, for Best Instrumental Artist at the Juno Awards of 1977, for Most Promising Group at the Juno Awards of 1978, and for Best Instrumental Artist at the Juno Awards of 1979.

== Discography ==
Albums

- Once Upon A Time... (1977), RCA Victor
- This Time (1979)

Singles

- "L'homme à L'harmonica / "Il Était Une Fois Dans L'Ouest" / "Le Bon, La Brute Et Le Truand" (1977)
- "Loving You" (1977)
- "Let's Try Once Again" / "Touch Me, Take Me" (1977)
- "Sheila" (1977)
- "A Man And His Harmonica" / "Once Upon A Time In The West" / "Theme From Black Light" (1978)
