= Richard Abel (musician) =

Canadian pianist

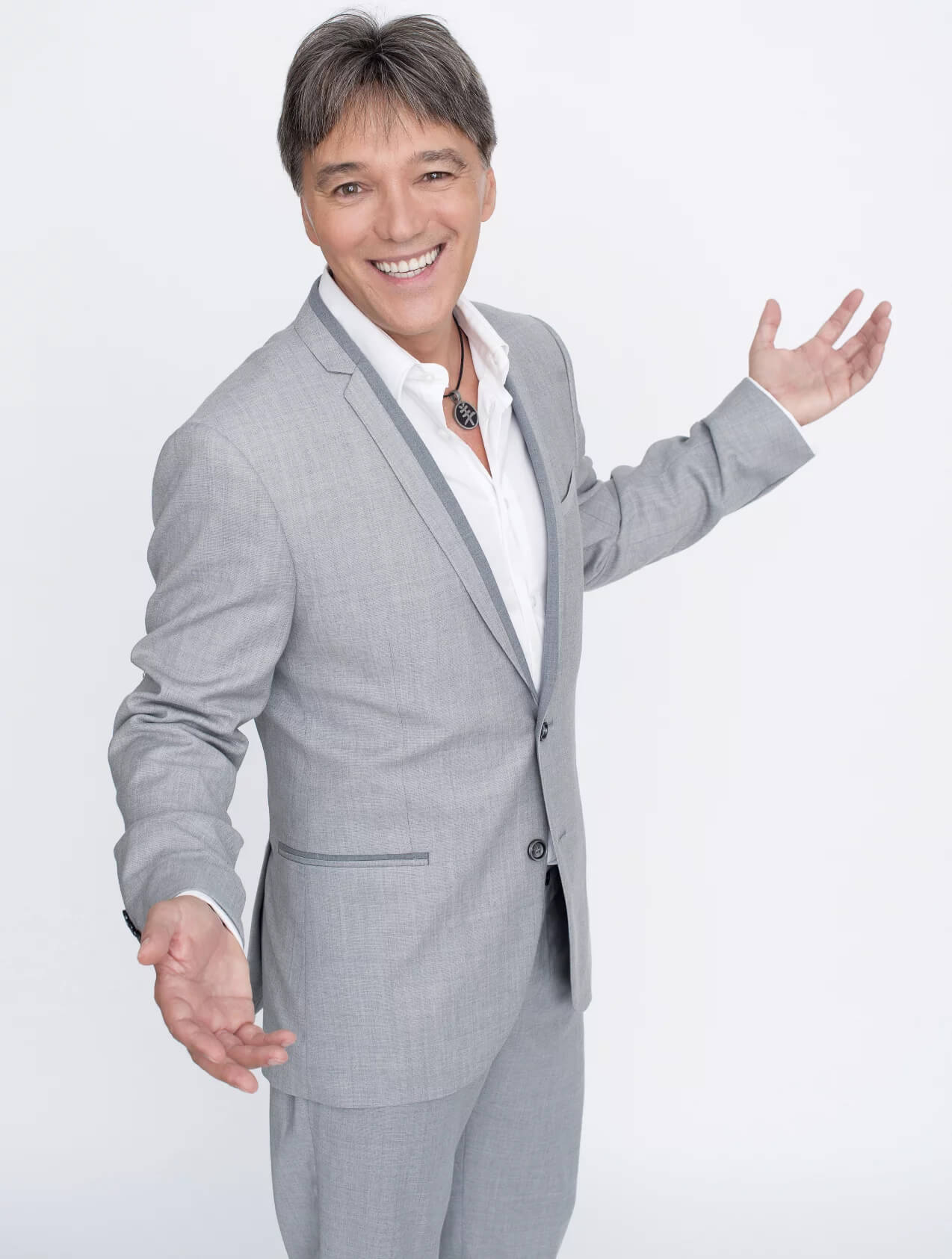

Richard Abel (born 1955) is a Canadian instrumental musician and pianist. He is one of the best selling Canadian instrumental artists of all time. He has been nominated for a Juno award three times.

== Early life ==
Son of a cab driver, who later became a craftsman, Richard Abel came from a very modest family. The taste for music and piano comes from his mother. He began to play by ear as a child, but did not take piano lessons until the age of 14 with nuns.

His first experience in front of an audience was playing on Sundays at the Marie-Reine-des-Cœurs church in Montreal, in what was then known as the rhythmic masses (also known as "gogo masses"). He did this for two years and he says that it was at this same church that he performed his first solo show at the age of 18.

He then took music lessons at the École normale de musique in Westmount and at the Cégep de Saint-Laurent in Montreal, with Armas Maiste, pianist of the Montreal Symphony Orchestra. To pay for his studies, he became a pianist accompanist at the renowned singing school of Roger Larivière who was also Ginette Reno's teacher.

== Career ==
Abel's first professional engagement was as pianist and conductor for Quebec crooner Michel Louvain. He then accompanied the comedy duo Ti-Gus et Ti-Mousse (Réal Béland - father, Ti-gus and Denyse Émond, which allowed him to make a name for himself as a pianist musician by authorizing him to perform several solos during their shows. He then dabbled in music hall in the context of Guilda's high-profile revues. Abel believes that the music hall was the best school for him. He had to learn how to tap dance (he even got a 3rd degree diploma from the Al Gilbert School in New York City, 1983), sing, act, do quick costume changes and, most importantly, capture the audience's attention.

He also accompanied Alys Robi and other popular artists, which allowed him to work in many of the great hotels and piano bars in the province of Quebec. He met the American pianist Liberace on three occasions, whose influence was major in his career, particularly in his choice of repertoire and in certain interpretation techniques. However, Abel claims to have never imitated him. He maintains that unlike Liberace, he does not wear a costume, except when the concept of the show requires it, as during his Viennese show Elegancia.

He recorded his first record, a 45 rpm vinyl disc or a single, in 1980 which included the pieces Clin d'œil (French for wink) and Thaïs. However, it is only with the release of his first LP (Enfin (French for Finally), 1988) that his career as a soloist begins to take off. Despite this, his career had little exposure in the mainstream media, his income was meager, and Abel struggled to make ends meet. He undertook promotional tours to promote his music. He undertook promotional tours in shopping malls in the province of Quebec, which increased his record sales and his audience loyalty.

He gave a private concert for Prince Philip, Duke of Edinburgh, participated in state dinners (Jeanne Sauvé, the President of Costa Rica, the President of Iceland) and even contributed to the soundtracks of the television series He Shoots, He Scores. He also made two cross-Canada tours with the Glenn Miller Orchestra.

His album Mélodies was nominated for LP of the year for instrumental music at the ADISQ Gala in 1991. In 1992, his first Christmas album, Noël au piano (French for Christmas at the piano), earned him his first Félix Award of ADISQ for instrumental album of the year. His albums Instrumental Memories in 1993 and Pour le Plaisir/Just for fun in 1995 were also both nominated for a Félix Award for instrumental album of the year. Pour le Plaisir/Just for fun was certified Platinum in Canada in 1996 with over 100,000 sales.

On 3 January 1996, he won the lottery, Lotto 6/49, with a ticket he bought with his father. His share is $714,000. Abel insists that this lottery win has nothing to do with the sales success of his album Pour le plaisir/Just for fun.

Contrary to rumors, Abel never won a second lottery jackpot. This story was only a joke on 1 April in 1997 launched by the journalist Jean-Paul Sylvain of the Journal de Montréal.

Abel won a second Felix award for instrumental album of the year with Pour le plaisir, just for fun vol. 2. This album obtained a Gold certification in 1997 with 50 000 sales in Canada.

In 2000, he recorded an album, Inspiration Classique (French for Classical inspiration), with the Prague Philharmonic Orchestra. This recording was certified platinum and earned him a third Felix Award for best instrumental album at the ADISQ Gala.

Romance (2001) and Élegancia (2006) earned him nominations for the Félix Award for Instrumental Album of the Year.

He then performed in larger venues in Quebec, including La salle Wilfrid-Pelletier in 2001, 2004, 2006 and 2008, as an opening act or as part of a show and as a solo artist in 2015 Théâtre Maisonneuve at Place des Arts in 1986, en in 2015 as an opening act. He did the Bell Centre in 2005 and the Place Bell in 2017.

In 2005, he recorded an album Hommage aux compositeurs canadiens et québécois (French for A Tribute to Canadian and Québécois composers) for Reader's Digest World in Brussels (Belgium), which won the Félix award for Instrumental Album of the Year.

In 2006, as spokesperson for the Cerebral Palsy Association he gave a show in Paris at the UNESCO hall. He also gave another concert in Lyon at the Bourse du travail in front of 2000 spectators, with Nanette Workman, Martin Deschamps and Yves Duteil.

He won another Felix Award for the instrumental album of the year with Noël, Christmas, Navidad, Weihnachten, Natale, Kerstmis, Jul in 2008. He recorded a television special entitled Elegancia, which was broadcast on PBS in 2009.

At the invitation of charitable organizations, including Atmavishwas, Abel made 4 tours in India in 2011, 2012, 2014 and 2019.

In November 2016, he published his biography, Richard Abel: mon histoire en noir et blanc(French for Richard Abel : my story in black and White) =, with the help of author and journalist, Denis-Martin Chabot, in which he reveals his difficult childhood and affirms for the first time his homosexuality. This book with more than 5000 sales is considered a best-seller in Quebec.

During his career, Abel has sold more than a million albums and DVDs.

== Discography ==
=== Singles ===
- Clin d'œil / Thaîs, 1980
- Mélodie d'Antan / Promenade au Carnaval, 1982
- Promedade dans les Îles / Bumble Boogie, 1984

=== Albums ===
- Enfin!, 1988
- Mélodies, 1990
- Noël au piano, 1991
- Instrumental Memories, 1992
- Pour le Plaisir – Vol. 1, 1994
- Pour le Plaisir – Vol. 2, 1996
- Instrumental Memories, – Vol. 2, 1997
- Richard Abel Live, 1999
- Inspiration classique, 2000
- Romance, 2002
- Hommage aux compositeurs Canadiens et québécois, 2004
- Elegancia, 2005
- Richard Abel Noël, 2007
- Elegancia Special PBS, 2009
- Instrumental Memories "The New Version", 2010
- Autour du Monde, 2014
- Hommage aux plus grands artistes de tous les temps, 2019

=== Compilations ===
- Richard Abel, Les grands succès, 1998
- L'Essentiel, 2003
- Richard Abel, Plus de 25 ans de musique, 2008
- Mes plus belles mélodies, 2016
- Für Sie, 2018
- Con el alma Latina, 2018
- Apposta per voi, 2018
- Sleep well my Angel Vol. 1, 2020
- On Wings of Dreams Vol. 2, 2020
- R. Abel Goes Classic Vol. 1, 2020
- R. Abel Goes Classic Vol. 2, 2020

=== DVDs ===
- Richard Abel Live, 1999
- Soirée Romantique avec Richard Abel, 2003
- Elegancia (Capitole de Québec) 2006
- Elegancia (USA-PBS) 2009

== Awards ==
Abel was nominated for a Juno award for best instrumental artist in 1996 and 1997 and for best instrumental album in 2002. Abel also has won five Felix Awards.

== Personal life ==
Abel lives in Sainte-Thérèse, north of Montreal.

== Citations ==
- It may not be good to suffer, but it is good to have suffered.
- Music is a balm for the wounds of the soul.
