= Liona Boyd =

Canadian classical guitarist (born 1949)

Liona Boyd OC OOnt
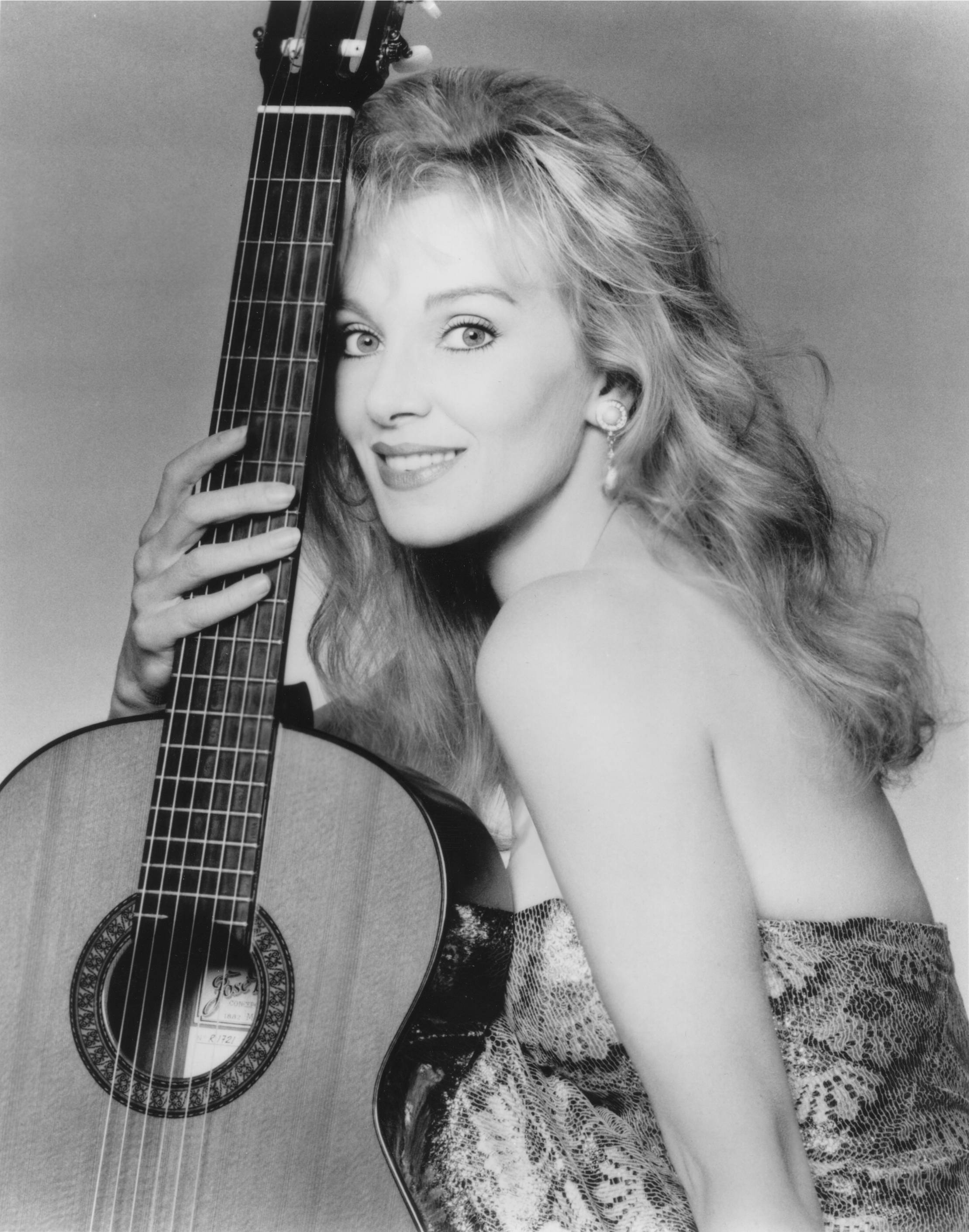
- Boyd in 1998

Background information
- Born: Liona Maria Carolynne Boyd; 11 July 1949 (age 77); London, England
- Education: University of Toronto
- Genres: Classical, new-age
- Occupation: Musician
- Instrument: Guitar
- Years active: 1962–present
- Labels: Boot, Sony, Columbia, RCA, Polygram, CBS Masterworks, Moston
- Website: www.lionaboyd.com

Liona Maria Carolynne Boyd, OC, OOnt (born 11 July 1949) is a Canadian classical guitarist often referred to as the 'First Lady of the Guitar'.

== Music career ==
=== Early years ===
Boyd was born in London and grew up in Toronto. Her father grew up in Bilbao, Spain, and her mother near Stoke-on-Trent, England. Her grandmother was from Linares, Spain, the birthplace of the "king of the classical guitar", Andrés Segovia. During her family's first of two ocean voyages to Canada she made her debut performance playing "Bluebells of Scotland" on a treble recorder in a talent show on the ship.

When she was thirteen, she was given her first guitar, a Christmas present which her parents had bought in Spain seven years earlier. She took lessons from Eli Kassner, Narciso Yepes, Alirio Díaz, Julian Bream, and Andrés Segovia.

Boyd received a Bachelor of Music degree from the University of Toronto in 1972, graduating with honours. After graduation she studied privately for two years with Alexandre Lagoya in Paris.

=== Performing ===
In 1975, she performed at Carnegie Hall in New York City. Andrés Segovia sent her a note that said "through your beauty and talent you will conquer the public, philharmonic or not." During the same year, she toured northern British Columbia and Yukon. She also toured as the opening act for Canadian folk singer Gordon Lightfoot.

=== Recordings ===
In 1974, Boyd released her debut album, The Guitar. It was produced by Eleanor Koldofsky and was released on Boot Records. The record was distributed internationally by London Records. In 1976, Boyd joined Society of Composers, Authors and Music Publishers of Canada, and established her own publishing company, Mid-Continental Music. In 1989, her album Christmas Dreams appeared on the RPM 100 Top Albums chart. To date she has three platinum and four gold albums in Canada.

Between 1978 and 1984 Boyd released nine albums internationally on the CBS Masterworks label. In 1981 she demanded that CBS withdraw the CX encoded version of her album Miniatures for Guitar because of perceived audio shortcomings, even though CBS Records group vice president Bob Jamieson claimed that CBS had the technical means to overcome such objections.

As of 2018, she has recorded 26 studio albums, made a live recording from Tokyo, created over 25 music videos, and produced three compilation recordings.

During her career, Boyd has recorded with Chet Atkins, Eric Clapton, Al Di Meola, Rik Emmett, David Gilmour, Alex Lifeson, Steve Morse, the Canadian Brass, André Gagnon, Yo Yo Ma, Frank Mills, Strunz & Farah, Roger Whittaker, Gheorghe Zamfir, Pavlo, Jesse Cook, and Olivia Newton-John.

=== Recordings ===
In 1995, Boyd contributed to the Canadian version of the Microsoft Windows 3.1 PC game "The Music Game".

== Personal life ==
In 1988, Stoddard Publishing of Toronto, Canada published Boyd's autobiography In My Own Key: My Life in Love and Music. In it she revealed her eight-year romance with former Canadian Prime Minister Pierre Trudeau. In 1992, Boyd moved to Beverly Hills, California, where she married John B. Simon, a real estate developer.

Following a diagnosis of musician's focal dystonia after the release of Camino Latino, Boyd was compelled to change how she plays guitar. She reinvented herself by developing her songwriting and singing skills and playing less demanding guitar arrangements.

After divorcing in 2004 she relocated to Miami and started a guitar duo with Srdjan Gjivoje. In 2007 she moved to New Canaan, Connecticut, to make a record with him called Liona Boyd Sings Songs of Love. They subsequently toured together. She released a new age album titled Seven Journeys which was co-written with her producer Peter Bond. In 2010, she lived in California once more. In 2011, she purchased a house in Palm Beach, Florida but made her home base in Toronto where she recorded 3 more albums produced by Peter Bond. She and accompanist Michael Savona toured Canada extensively. In 2016, Liona formed a new touring duo with Andrew Dolson.

In August 2017, Dundurn Press reissued Boyd's first memoir In My Own Key and published her second memoir, No Remedy for Love. In this book Boyd claims to have played a private concert for jurors at the murder trial of O. J. Simpson in the mid-1990s. This was at the request of judge Lance Ito who Boyd says was a big fan of her music.

In 2017, Liona filmed "A Winter Fantasy", a live Christmas special that was broadcast in December 2018 on several PBS stations including WNED-TV in Buffalo, New York.

In 2018, Blackstone Publishing released an audiobook of Liona reading her autobiography In My Own Key.

== Awards and honours ==
- Instrumental Artist of the Year, Juno Awards, five times
- Gallery of the Greats, Guitar Player Magazine
- Classical Guitar Musician of the Year, Guitar Player, five times
- Order of Canada, Member: 1982, Officer: 2021
- Order of Ontario, 1991
- Vanier Award, 1978
- Prix Esprit du Ciècle
- Diamond Jubilee Award, 2013
- JoAnn Falletta competition Lifetime Achievement, 2018
- National Guitar Museum Lifetime Achievement Award, 2019

== Discography ==
Title	Label	Year
The Guitar/Classical Guitar	Boot/London	1974
The Guitar Artistry of Liona Boyd	Boot/London	1975
Miniatures for Guitar	Boot/CBS Masterworks	1977
The First Lady of the Guitar	Columbia	1978
The First Nashville Guitar Quartet (with Chet Atkins)	RCA	1979
Liona Boyd with Andrew Davis and the English Chamber Orchestra	CBS Masterworks	1979
Spanish Fantasy	CBS Masterworks	1980
A Guitar for Christmas	CBS Masterworks	1981
The Best of Liona Boyd (compilation and new recordings)	CBS Masterworks	1982
Virtuoso	CBS Masterworks	1983
Liona Live in Tokyo	CBS Masterworks	1984
The Romantic Guitar of Liona Boyd (#92 CAN)	CBS Masterworks	1985
Persona (#75 CAN 5 non-consecutive weeks)	CBS Masterworks	1986
Encore (#55 CAN)	A & M	1988
Christmas Dreams (#71 CAN)	A & M	1989
Highlights (compilation)	A & M	1989
Paddle to the Sea	Oak Street	1990
Dancing on the Edge	Moston	1991
Classically Yours	Moston	1995
Whispers of Love	Moston	1999
The Spanish Album (compilation and new recordings)	Moston	1999
Passport to Serenity (compilation)	Moston	2000
Camino Latino	Moston	2002
Romanza (compilation and new recordings)	Moston	2005
Liona Boyd Sings Songs of Love	Moston/Universal	2009
Seven Journeys: Music for the Soul and Imagination (Liona Boyd and Peter Bond)	Moston/Universal	2009
The Return... To Canada with Love	Moston/Universal	2013
A Winter Fantasy	Moston/Universal	2015
The Relaxing Guitar of Liona Boyd (digital only compilation).	Moston/Universal	2016
No Remedy for Love	Moston/Universal	2017
Once Upon A Time	Moston/Universal	2023
