= André Gagnon =

Canadian composer and pianist (1936–2020)

André Gagnon CQ OC
- Born: 2 August 1936; Saint-Pacôme, Quebec
- Died: 3 December 2020 (aged 84) Montreal, Quebec
- Occupations: composer, conductor, arranger, actor
- Website: andregagnon.net

André Gagnon OC OQ (2 August 1936 – 3 December 2020) was a Canadian pianist, composer, conductor, arranger, and actor, known for his fusion of classical and pop styles, including compositions Neiges, Smash, Chevauchée, Surprise, Donna, and Mouvements in the disco and pop fields. Gagnon also composed for television, including La Souris Verte, Vivre en ce Pays, Format 60, Format 30,Techno-Flash, and Les Forges de Saint-Maurice as well as for theatre with such productions as La Poudre aux Yeux, Doña Rosita, Terre d'Aube, La Dame de Chez Maxim's, and Wouf-Wouf. Some of his most notable songs are "Pour les Amants", "Turluteries", and "Mes Quatre Saisons".

== Early life ==
Gagnon was born in Saint-Pacôme, Quebec, Canada. The youngest of nineteen children, Gagnon began composing at the age of six and according to the Canadian Encyclopedia, "He took theory lessons with Léon Destroismaisons in Ste. Anne-de-la-Pocatière from 1952-53 and studied at the Conservatoire de musique à Montréal with Germaine Malépart (piano), Clermont Pépin (composition), and Gilberte Martin (solfège) from 1957 to 1961."

== Career ==
According to Gagnon's official website, "In 1974, André Gagnon released Saga, his first album, composed solely of original instrumental pieces". In 1975, the album Neiges stayed on the American Billboard's Top 10 for twenty-four weeks and sold 700,000 copies worldwide. In May 1976, Gagnon did four concerts in Mexico and in September of the same year, Neiges was released in New York under the title Driven Snow. In 1977, Neiges won a Juno award for the most purchased album in Canada while Gagnon's album Le Saint-Laurent rapidly reached 100,000 sold copies. In 1978, André Gagnon was made an officer of the Order of Canada. In the fall of 1979, Gagnon received his first Félix, an award created by the Quebecois music industry in the instrumental category for the album Le Saint-Laurent. He also began to add film scores to his repertoire, among them the soundtracks to Running (1979), the John Huston film Phobia (1980), and The Hot Touch (1981), directed by Roger Vadim. Gagnon went on world tour in 1981 to the United States, Venezuela, Mexico, Greece, and Romania. During this year, he also composed original music for the film Tell Me That You Love Me, a production of Astral Films. In October, he recorded Impressions in the famous Abbey Road studio.

In February 1990, the opera Nelligan was released, for which Gagnon wrote the music. The opera was presented first at the Grand Theatre of Quebec and then the Place of the Arts of Montreal and finally at the National Centre of the Arts of Ottawa. Following the opera's Canadian release was the release of the studio-recorded double album, Nelligan.

In January 1992, Gagnon composed the music for the film The Pianist. In 1999, the album Juliette Pomerleau was released. In 2011, the album Les chemins ombragés was certified a gold album having sold 40,000 copies.

Gagnon also composed music for many artists, such as Diane Dufresne (Le 304), Renée Claude (Je suis une femme d'aujourd'hui, Ballade pour mes vieux jours) and Nicole Martin (Mannequin).

Gagnon died on 3 December 2020, at age 84. He had suffered from Lewy body disease.

== Awards and recognition ==
=== Juno awards ===
- 1978: Instrumental Artist of the Year
- 1995: Instrumental Artist of the Year

He has received Juno nominations in several other years.

=== Government honours ===
Gagnon was appointed an Officer of the Order of Canada in 1978 and an Officer of the National Order of Quebec in 2018.

== Discography ==
=== Albums ===
Year	Title
1964	André Gagnon – Piano et orchestre
1965	Léveillée-Gagnon
1966	Une voix, deux pianos
1968	Pour les amants
1969	Notre amour
1969	Mes quatre saisons
1971	Let It Be Me
1972	Les Turluteries
1972	Encore
1973	Projection / Les forges de St-Maurice
1973	Les grands succes d'André Gagnon
1974	Saga
1975	Neiges
1977	Le Saint-Laurent
1978	Movements
1981	Left Turn
1982	Les grands succès/Greatest Hits
1983	Impressions
1986	Comme dans un film
1986	Des dames de coeur
1990	Nelligan (with Michel Tremblay)
1992	Noël
1993	Les jours tranquilles
1993	Presque blue
1994	Romantique
1995	Piano
1996	Twilight Time
1996	Musique (Coffret de collection)
1997	André Gagnon au Centre Molson
1997	Éden
1997	La collection émergence
1999	Juliette Pomerleau
1999	Printemps
1999	Été
1999	Automne
1999	Hiver
2001	Histoires rêvées
2003	Piano solitude
2010	Les chemins ombragés
2011	Dans le silence de la nuit (Christmas album)
2016	Les voix intérieures

=== Singles ===
Year	Title
1968	"Pour les amants"
1969	"Chanson pour Petula" b/w "La fête"
1971	"Rainbow"
1975	"Wow" b/w "Ta samba"
1976	"Surprise" b/w "Douce image"
1977	"Donna" b/w "Holiday Feeling"
1978	"Smash" b/w "Rendez-vous"
1977	"Weekend"
1980	"A Ride to Ville Émard" b/w "Beautiful Days"
1981	"Left Turn" b/w "Two Days in the Country"
