= Margaret J. Osler =

Canadian historian and philosopher

Margaret Jo Osler
- Born: November 27, 1942
- Died: September 15, 2010 (aged 67); Calgary, Alberta, Canada
- Citizenship: United States, Canada
- Education: Swarthmore College; Indiana University
- Scientific career
- Fields: Historian (History of Science, Philosopher (Philosophy of Science, History of Philosophy)
- Workplaces: University of Calgary, Wake Forest University, Harvey Mudd College, Oregon State University
- Doctoral advisor: Richard S. Westfall

Margaret J. "Maggie" Osler (November 27, 1942 – September 15, 2010) was a historian and philosopher of early modern science and a professor of history at the University of Calgary.

== Biography ==
She was born into a Jewish family. Osler received a B.A. in philosophy from Swarthmore College in 1963, and M.A. (1966) and Ph.D. (1968) degrees from Indiana University in History and Philosophy of Science under the supervision of Richard S. Westfall. The title of her dissertation was John Locke and Some Philosophical Problems in the Science of Boyle and Newton. She held teaching appointments at Oregon State University, Harvey Mudd College, and Wake Forest University before coming to the University of Calgary in 1975. There, she rose through the ranks, being promoted to professor in 1995. In 1998, she was appointed adjunct professor in philosophy, and in 2002 adjunct professor of history at the University of Alberta.

Osler's work concentrated on the history and context of the Scientific Revolution and the relation of early modern science to religion. Her work includes writings on Locke, Galileo, Descartes, Boyle, Newton, and Gassendi.

She was active in a number of academic societies, especially the History of Science Society, for which she served as secretary from 2001 until her death. She was president of the Canadian Society for the History and Philosophy of Science from 1987 to 1990. Osler served as editor for the Journal of the History of Philosophy, and was on the editorial board of a number of other journals.

== Books ==
- Osler, Margaret J. (2010). Reconfiguring the World: Nature, God, and Human Understanding from the Middle Ages to Early Modern Europe. Baltimore: Johns Hopkins University Press. ISBN 978-0-8018-9656-9.
- Osler, Margaret J., ed. (2000). Rethinking the Scientific Revolution. Cambridge: Cambridge University Press. ISBN 978-0-521-66790-6.
- Osler, Margaret J (1994). Divine Will and the Mechanical Philosophy: Gassendi and Descartes on Contingency and Necessity in the Created World. Cambridge: Cambridge University Press. ISBN 978-0-521-46104-7.
- Osler, Margaret J., ed. (1991). Atoms, Pneuma, and Tranquillity: Epicurean and Stoic Themes in European Thought. Cambridge: Cambridge University Press. ISBN 978-0-521-40048-0.
- Osler, Margaret J.; Farber, Paul Lawrence, eds. (1985). Religion, Science, and Worldview: Essays in Honor of Richard S. Westfall. Cambridge: Cambridge University Press. ISBN 978-0-521-52493-3.
- Hanen, Marsha P.; Osler, Margaret J.; Weyant, Robert G., eds. (1980). Science, Pseudo-Science, and Society. Waterloo: Wilfrid Laurier University Press. ISBN 0-88920-100-5.

== Other works ==
- "The Intellectual Sources of Robert Boyle's Philosophy of Nature: Gassendi's Voluntarism and Boyle's Physico-Theological Project" (pages 178–198) in Philosophy, Science, and Religion in England, 1640-1700, Richard W. F. Kroll, Richard Ashcraft, Perez Zagorin, Cambridge University Press, 1991, ISBN 0-521-41095-9, ISBN 978-0-521-41095-3, 287 pages

Osler argues that Boyle drew on Gassendi's writings as he developed his Christianized corpuscular natural philosophy. She shows that their positions were almost identical--especially those regarding a voluntarist doctrine of God, nominalism, empiricism, and natural theology. Thus, she indicates that (contra James James) this pattern of ideas preceded Boyle's particular political and social situation.

— Science and Religion in the English Speaking World, 1600-1727 A Bibliographic Guide to the Secondary Literature

- "Certainty, Scepticism, and Scientific Optimism: The Roots of Eighteenth-Century Attitudes Toward Scientific Knowledge" (pp. 3–28) in Probability, Time, and Space in Eighteenth-century Literature, Paula R. Backscheider, Modern Language Association of America, AMS Press, 1979, ISBN 0-404-16046-8, ISBN 978-0-404-16046-3, 307 pages

Osler traces two different epistemological traditions which converged on the mechanical philosophy and which produced two contradictory attitudes toward scientific knowledge. One of the traditions is the probabilism rooted in the skeptical crisis connected to post-Reformation theological debates. The article is mainly post-1720 in its thrust, but much of it is devoted to the seventeenth-century "roots. "

— Science and Religion in the English Speaking World, 1600-1727 A Bibliographic Guide to the Secondary Literature

- "Descartes and Charleton on Nature and God" in J. Hist. Ideas Volume 40, 1979, pages 445–456.

Osler shows that empiricist and rationalist "theories of knowledge were rooted in the theological traditions from which the systems emerged." These traditions emphasized, respectively, God's will and God's intellect. Osler compares the epistemology of Walter Charleton (working within the first tradition) with that of Descartes (working within the second).

— Science and Religion in the English Speaking World, 1600-1727 A Bibliographic Guide to the Secondary Literature
