= John Arpin =

Canadian ragtime pianist (1936–2007)

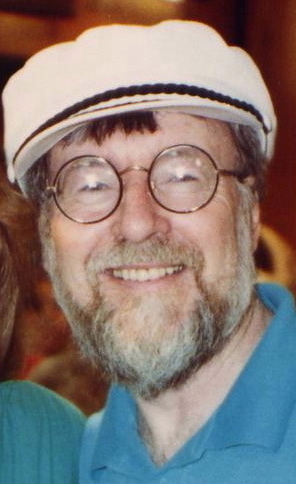
- John Arpin at the 1990 Scott Joplin Ragtime Festival in Sedalia, Missouri
- Born: 3 December 1936; Port McNicoll, Ontario, Canada
- Died: 8 November 2007 (aged 70); Toronto, Ontario, Canada
- Education: University of Toronto
- Occupations: Canadian composer, recording artist and entertainer, ragtime pianist.

John Francis Oscar Arpin (3 December 1936 – 8 November 2007) was a Canadian composer, recording artist and entertainer, best known for his work as a virtuoso ragtime pianist.

Born in Port McNicoll, Ontario Arpin studied piano at The Royal Conservatory of Music, earning his ARCT diploma in 1953. He also studied at the Faculty of Music, University of Toronto.

Arpin performed frequently and toured widely during his musical career, which spanned more than four decades. He continued to perform until shortly before his death. He died of cancer on 8 November 2007 in Toronto, Ontario.

== Recording career ==
Arpin recorded more than sixty albums, mostly of ragtime, but also played Broadway music, pop music, and classical music.

In 2002, he recorded seven CDs of piano solo music on the April Avenue record label. These albums consisted of favorite Broadway themes and familiar pop tunes.

== Performances ==
Arpin performed as a solo entertainer and with orchestras throughout the world. In Canada, he performed with Maureen Forrester and Peter Appleyard. He made several appearances at the Mariposa Folk Festival, the St. Louis Ragtime Festival, and the Scott Joplin Festival in Sedalia, Missouri. In the Toronto area, he performed regularly in bars, clubs, and hotel lounges, notably The King Edward Hotel, The Ports of Call, The Windsor Arms, Mr. Tony's, and Pearcy House.

== Awards ==
Arpin was nominated three times for Juno Awards, given to show excellence in Canadian music. In June 1998, he won the Scott Joplin Award from the Scott Joplin Foundation of Sedalia, Missouri.

== Critical acclaim ==
Ragtime great Eubie Blake pronounced John Arpin "the Chopin of Ragtime", while The New York Times labeled him "the Richter of Ragtime". High Fidelity magazine said of one of his albums: "This is the best recorded collection of piano rags that I know of and is, I suspect, the most authentically performed."

== Compositions ==
Notable among his own compositions are "Jogging Along" (a theme song for the acclaimed CBC radio program Morningside). He also composed the theme for TVOntario's children's shows, Polka Dot Door and Polka Dot Shorts and wrote the music for the shows. Arpin also composed the themes for several CTV network shows in the 1960s. His "Lyric Suite for Piano, Strings and Percussion" won first prize out of 450 entrants in the Yamaha Second International Original Concert in Tokyo. He also arranged music for several Canadian recording acts.

In 2005, he was commissioned by St. Michael's Choir School (Toronto) to compose and arrange a "medley" of Christmas tunes which he titled "Yuletide on the Cool Side". It was very warmly received in its premiere on a concert tour across Canada.
