= Vasyl Popadiuk =

Ukrainian musician

- Василь Попадюк
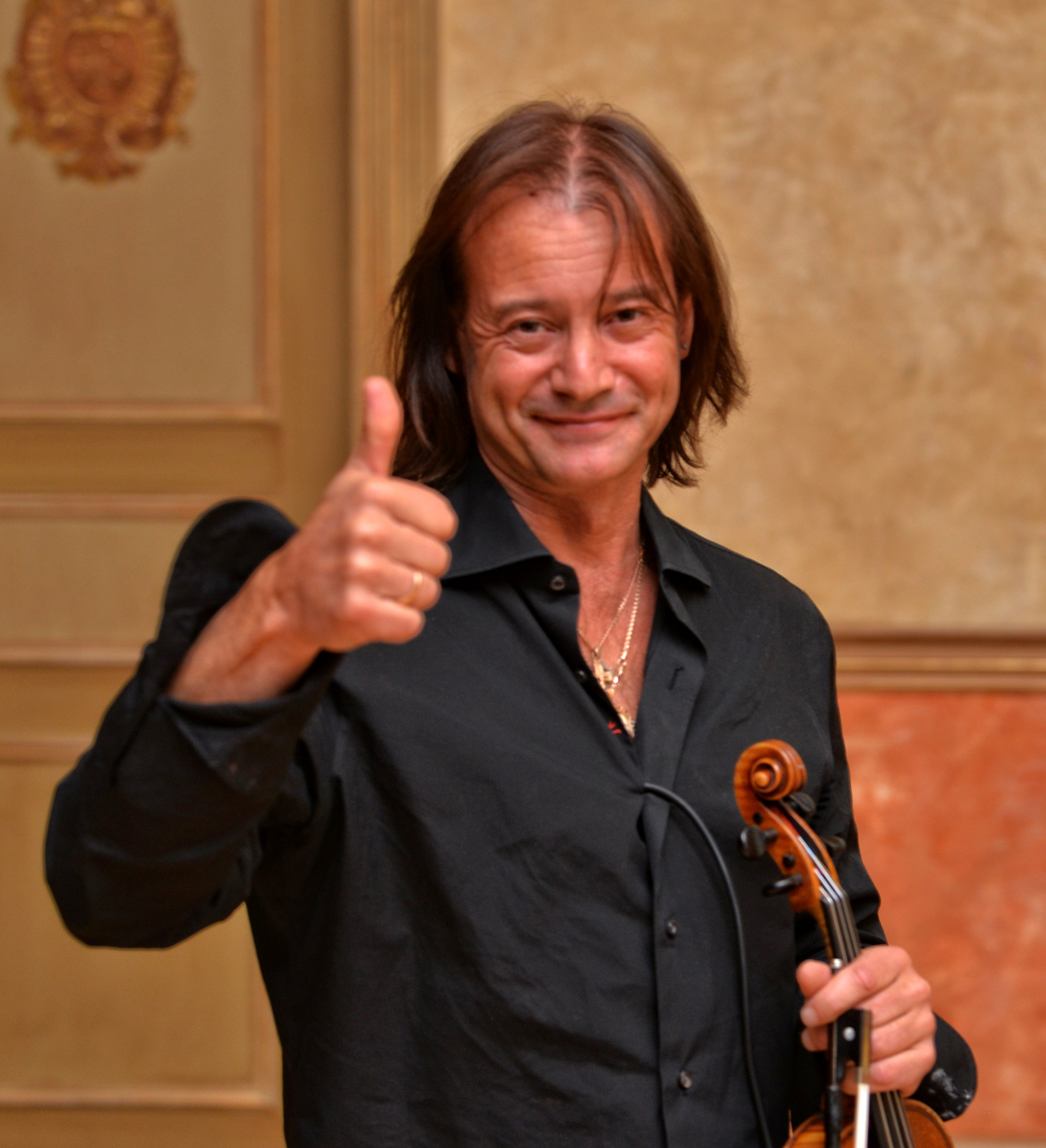
- Popadiuk in 2017
- Born: January 16, 1966 (age 60); Lviv, Ukrainian SSR, Soviet Union

Vasyl Vasylovych Popadyuk (Ukrainian: Василь Васильович Попадюк; born January 16, 1966) is a Ukrainian musician, known as the "Ukrainian Paganini", violinist, pianist, founder of the band "PapaDuke", with whom he travels the world, playing music in world music styles, Latino, gypsy, and jazz. He knows how to play 15 musical instruments, and each of the musicians in the band also plays various musical instruments. He is also a composer. He is an honored artist of Ukraine since 2009.

== Biography ==
He was born into a family of artists. His mother, Svitlana Popadiuk, is a choreographer, and his father, Vasyl Ivanovych Popadiuk (1940–1991), from the village of Myshyn, Kolomyia District, Ivano-Frankivsk region, was a famous flutist, a member of the Veryovka Choir, and directed the ensemble "Troyisti Muzyky".

Vasyl Popadiuk studied at the Kyiv specialized music school named after Mykola Lysenko from the age of seven he was trained in classical music. Then he entered the Tchaikovsky National Academy of Music of Ukraine, from where he moved to the correspondence department of the Lviv Academy of Music named after Lysenko.

He completed his military service in Kyiv in the song and dance ensemble, which constantly gave concerts for the liquidators of the Chernobyl accident. Later, doctors recommended Vasyl Popadyuk to change his place of residence in 1988 and he moved to work to Moscow. There, in the World Music Theater, under the direction of Vladimir Nazarov, he managed to play ten new national instruments of the world and learned the art of reincarnation. In 1993 he returned to Kyiv, where he played in the ensemble "Hopak", collaborated with the State Gypsy Theater "Romans".

Since 1997, he has lived and worked in Toronto and Ottawa. He is married to Solomiya Khmara, the daughter of Ukrainian politician and Soviet dissident Stepan Khmara, and has three daughters, Moryana, Sofiyka and Katrusya. The family speaks Ukrainian.

In 2003, he participated in the television show "Big Musical Canadian Dream", where he competed with 15 thousand other violinists. In the final, she performed a Hutsul fantasy and took second place.

In April 2022 he participated in a concert in Regina (Canada) at the Conexus Arts Centre to benefit the Luhansk Children's Hospital.

In May 2022, together with his band, Papaduke he gave a concert at the Zoetic Theater in Canada.

On January 27, 2023, in the municipal auditorium "Paco de Lucía" in Alcalá de Henares he gave a concert to raise funds dedicated to getting ambulances for Ukraine.
