= Zamfir =

Zamfir is both a Romanian given name and surname. Notable people with the name include:

== Surname ==
- Constantin Zamfir (1951–2025), Romanian footballer
- Cristina Zamfir (born 1989), Romanian handballer
- Gheorghe Zamfir (born 1941), Romanian pan-flute musician
- Mircea Zamfir (born 1985), Romanian gymnast
- Nicolae Zamfir (1944–2022), Romanian football manager
- Nicolae Zamfir (footballer, born 1967) (born 1967), Romanian footballer
- Nicolae Zamfir (wrestler) (born 1958), Romanian wrestler

== Given name ==
- Zamfir Arbore (1848–1933), Romanian activist
- Zamfir Dumitrescu (1946–2021), Romanian painter
- Zamfir Munteanu, politician

== See also ==
- Safir (disambiguation)
- Zamfirescu
- Zamfirești (disambiguation)
