= Trifecta (album) =

Studio album by Pavlo, Rik Emmett, Oscar Lopez
- Released: 2009
- Recorded: unknown
- Genres: New Flamenco, Latin jazz, World music
- Length: 44:18
- Label: P.R.O.
- Producers: Pavlo, Rik Emmett, Oscar Lopez

Trifecta is the debut album released by the guitarist Pavlo, Rik Emmett, Oscar Lopez. It originated with Pavlo’s long-standing inspiration by the famous guitar trio project of Paco de Lucía, Al Di Meola and John McLaughlin, Pavlo wanted to create a Canadian Guitar Trio. When many thought it would be too difficult to collaborate with other musicians that were famous within their own genres, Pavlo called on legendary guitarists, Oscar Lopez, and Hall of Famer, Rik Emmett (lead guitarist from rock group, Triumph).

This album was nominated for a Juno Award in 2010 for Instrumental Album of the Year.

== Track listing ==
No.	Title	Length
1.	"Melting Pot"	5:01
2.	"Redbird 250"	3:23
3.	"Moonlight On La Costanera"	4:38
4.	"Viola"	4:04
5.	"Trifecta"	4:36
6.	"Thousand Islands"	4:30
7.	"Dreamers"	4:38
8.	"Jumpin' Django"	2:07
9.	"Niko's Tiny Carousel"	3:06
10.	"(The Dance Of The) Three Jacks"	3:30
11.	"Fiesta"	4:10
Total length:		44:18

== Personnel ==
- Pavlo – Acoustic / Flamenco Guitar (Panned Stereo Left) & Electric Sitar Guitar
- Rik Emmett – Classical / Acoustic Guitar (Panned Stereo Middle) & Bass Guitar
- Oscar Lopez – Acoustic / Flamenco Guitar (Panned Stereo Right)
- Michael Shotton – Drums, Percussion, Keyboards, Programming
- Ian Lannen – Bodhran (Track 1 - "Melting Pot")
- Albert Steen – Mandolin (Track 4 - "Viola")
- Carlo Dibattista – Trumpet (Track 10 - "(The Dance Of The) Three Jacks")
- Rik Emmett – Harmony Vocals (Track 11 - "Fiesta")
- Oscar Lopez – Lead Vocals, Body Percussion / Palmas (Track 11 - "Fiesta")
- Pavlo – Body Percussion / Palmas (Track 11 - "Fiesta")

== Production ==
- Primary Producers – Pavlo, Rik Emmett, Oscar Lopez
- Co-Producer – Michael Shotton
- Recording Engineer – Michael Shotton
- Recording Location – The Underground (Burlington, Ontario, Canada)
- Mixing Engineer – Rick Andersen
- Mixing Location – The Underground (Burlington, Ontario, Canada)
- Mastering Engineers – Rick Andersen, Michael Shotton
- Audio Sequencing & Compilation – Michael Shotton, Rick Andersen
- Glass Mastered & Pressed At – Sony DADC, Toronto (SG42989)
- Art Direction & Design – Konstantine Arnokouros
- Photography – Andrew MacNaughtan
- Published By – Hejaz Entertainment, Rockit Sounds Publishing, Oscar Lopez (SOCAN)
- Copyright – (P) & (C) 2009 P.R.O.
