= Keshia Chanté discography =

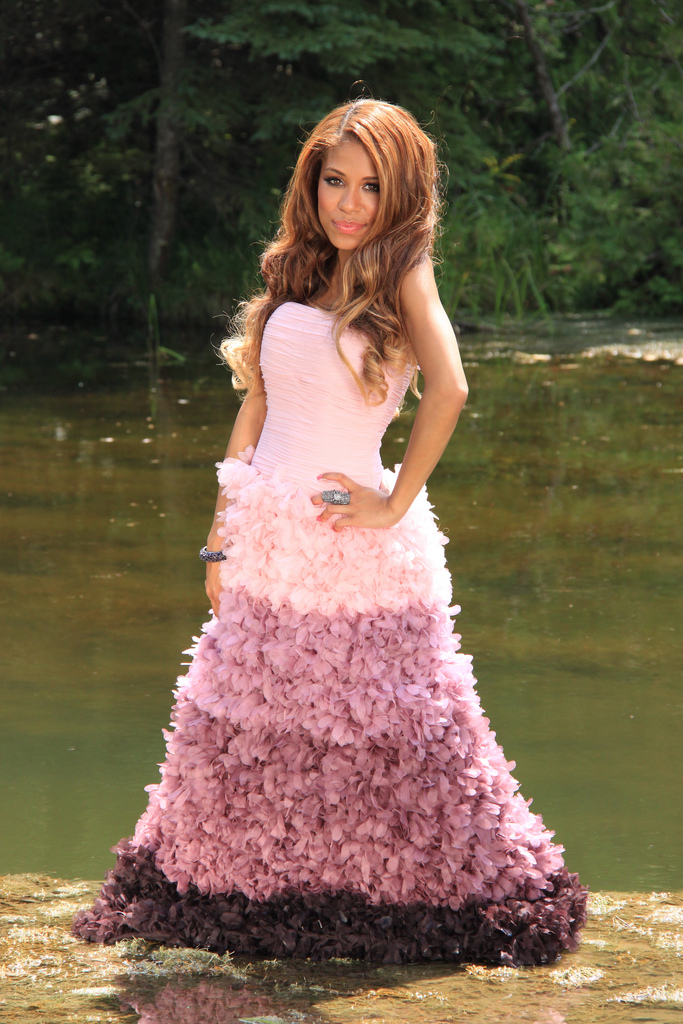
- Studio albums: 3
- Singles: 15
- Music videos: 11
- Top 10s: 5

The discography of Canadian singer Keshia Chanté consists of four studio albums, eight top ten singles, fifteen singles and ten music videos.

She has had eight Top Ten singles at radio with songs "Shook", "Unpredictable", "Bad Boy", "Does He Love Me?", "Been Gone", "2U", "Fallen" & "Table Dancer". Chanté has won many awards, including a Juno Award, "Best New Artist" at the Canadian Radio Awards and five Urban Music Awards, as well as "Video of the Year" and "Fans Choice".

After a three-year musical hiatus, in November 2010 Chante released 2 videos for 2 new singles "Table Dancer" and "Test Drive", both from her album Night & Day, which was released November 2011. Both singles were nominated for Juno Awards; R&B Recording of the Year for "Test Drive" and Dance Recording of the Year for "Table Dancer". The latter song also charted at number one on the Billboard chart in Japan, making it Chanté's first song to chart outside of Canada.

== Albums ==
=== Studio albums ===
+ List of studio albums, with selected chart positions, sales figures and certifications
Title	Album details	
Title	Album details	Certifications
Keshia Chanté	Released: June 22, 2004; Label: BMG; Formats: CD, digital download	MC: Gold
2U	Released: December 5, 2006; Label: Sony BMG; Formats: CD, digital download	
Night & Day	Released: November 8, 2011; Label: Universal Music; Formats: CD, digital download	
Unbound 02	Released: March 23, 2018; Label: Universal Music; Formats: CD, digital download	

== Singles ==
=== As lead artist ===
List of singles as main artist, with selected chart positions, sales figures and certifications
Title	Year	Peak chart positions	Album
Title	Year	CAN	Album
"Shook (The Answer)"	2003	—	Keshia Chanté
"Unpredictable"	2003	11	Keshia Chanté
"Bad Boy"	2004	—	Keshia Chanté
"Does He Love Me?" (featuring Foxy Brown)	2004	—	Keshia Chanté
"Let the Music Take You"	2004	—	Keshia Chanté
"Come Fly with Me"	2005	—	Keshia Chanté
"Ring the Alarm"	2006	—	2U
"Been Gone"	2006	—	2U
"2U"	2006	—	2U
"Fallen" (featuring Freeway)	2007	—	2U
"Table Dancer"	2010	44	Night & Day
"Set U Free"	2011	84	Night & Day
"Shooting Star"	2011	—	Night & Day
"Edit, Cut, & Delete U"	2011	—	Night & Day
"I Miss U"	2012	—	Night & Day
"The Valley"	2016	—	Unbound 02
"Lights Out"	2017	—	Unbound 02
"Rotation"	2017	—	Unbound 02
"Bittersweet"	2018	—	Unbound 02
