= MuchDance =

1997 compilation album

Compilation album by Various
- Released: 1997

Various chronology
MuchDance (1997)	MuchDance 1999 (1998)

MuchDance is a series of pop/dance albums featuring various artists compiled, mixed and released by the Canadian television station MuchMusic, starting in 1997. It continues a similar series released in association with Quality Records from 1990 to 1997 under the name Muchmusic Dance Mix.

In addition to the ordinary albums in the series, MuchMusic also released albums such as MuchDance 80s (2005) that included classics like Paula Abdul's "Straight Up." There has also been a volume of MuchDance 90s released, along with two #1 hits compilations.

In Quebec, the album were distributed under the name DansePlus until 2019; it is bases upon the former channel MusiquePlus.

In the United States, Quality Records released the set as Dance Mix USA from 1993 to 1998.

Much Dance 2020, Much Dance 2021, Much Dance 2022 are not mixed by DJs. Instead, these entries are regular compilation albums.

== History ==
Quality released the first Dance Mix album as Dance Mix '90. Two years later, Muchmusic Dance Mix '92 was released with the Muchmusic logo on the cover and a series of advertisements on the channel. The final album in this series, Dance Mix 1997, was released by Quality without Much Music branding. In the United States, Quality, through its co-owned US subsididary Critique/Radikal Records, used featured tracks from "Dance Mix '92" to release the first of eight "Dance Mix USA" compilations. These compilations proved to be popular with American fans as a result of endless television and print campaigns. The last "Dance Mix USA" set released in America was in 1998 through Radikal.

The album MuchDance 1997 was released in 1997. Starting in 1998, a new edition has since been released every year, with the title of the album reflecting the next year (thus why there is no MuchDance 1998, as the album released that year was released under the title of MuchDance 1999).

The latest album in the series, MuchDance 2022, was released on December 3, 2021.

== Albums ==
=== Dance Mix '90 ===
Dance Mix '90

Compilation album by Various
- Released: August 7, 1990
- Label: Quality Music

Various chronology
Dance Mix '90 (1990)	Dance Mix '91 (1991)

No.	Title	Artist	Length
1.	"The Look (Visible Mix)"	Roxette	2:58
2.	"Keep On Movin' (Club Mix)"	Soul II Soul	2:57
3.	"Don't Make Me Over (The KING-Dom Come Mix)"	Sybil Lynch	3:01
4.	"Girl You Know It's True"	Milli Vanilli	3:51
5.	"Ride on Time (Massive Mix)"	Black Box	4:12
6.	"Big Fun"	Inner City	1:23
7.	"What You Don't Know (Atomic Mix)"	Exposé	2:48
8.	"Fascinated (Club Mix)"	Company B	4:00
9.	"I Love to Bass (Bring the Noiz Dance Mix)"	Bardeux	3:38
10.	"She Wants to Dance with Me (Extended Remix)"	Rick Astley	2:54
11.	"I Want You"	Shana	2:34
12.	"This Time I Know It's for Real (Extended Version)"	Donna Summer	3:33
13.	"Kisses on the Wind (English 12" Mix)"	Neneh Cherry	3:37
14.	"Situation"	Yazoo	2:47
15.	"Little Respect (12" Vocal)"	Erasure	4:00
16.	"You Ain't Seen Nothin' Yet (12" Club Mix)"	Figures on a Beach	2:33
17.	"Strange Love (Maxi-Mix)"	Depeche Mode	3:17
18.	"Kiss Me"	Stephen Tin Tin Duffy	3:36

=== Dance Mix '91 ===
Dance Mix '91

Compilation album by Various
- Released: August 6, 1991
- Label: Quality Music

Various chronology
Dance Mix '90 (1990)	Dance Mix '91 (1991)	Much Dance Mix '92 (1992)

No.	Title	Artist	Length
1.	"Sadeness (Album Version)"	Enigma	4:17
2.	"Hippychick (No Ted Acid Mix)"	Soho	4:23
3.	"B.B.D. (I Thought It Was Me)? (Extended Version)"	Bell Biv Devoe	4:15
4.	"Rub You the Right Way (7" Single Mix)"	Johnny Gill	4:36
5.	"Ice Ice Baby (Clubmix)"	Vanilla Ice	4:45
6.	"Pray (7" Single Mix)"	MC Hammer	5:12
7.	"So Hard (Extended Dance Mix)"	Pet Shop Boys	4:41
8.	"Got a Love for You (Hurley's House Mix)"	Jomanda	6:57
9.	"Everybody Everybody (Le Freak Mix - 7" Edit)"	Black Box	4:00
10.	"Wiggle It (Radio Mix)"	2 In A Room	3:46
11.	"This Is the Right Time (Radio Version)"	Lisa Stansfield	4:05
12.	"Got to Get (Extended Mix)"	Rob'n'Raz (featuring Leila K)	3:10
13.	"Ooops Up (The Burn Rubber Mix)"	Snap!	4:42
14.	"The World Just Keeps On Turning (12" Club Mix)"	Candi & The Backbeat	4:49
15.	"The Power (Extended Mix)"	Power Jam (featuring Chill Rob G)	5:37

=== Dance Mix '92 ===
X-Tendamix Dance Mix '92

Compilation album by Various
- Released: August 4, 1992
- Label: Quality Music

Various chronology
Dance Mix '91 (1991)	X-Tendamix Dance Mix '92 (1992)	X-Tendamix Dance Mix '93 (1993)

No.	Title	Artist	Length
1.	"Set Adrift on Memory Bliss"	P.M. Dawn	4:07
2.	"Sensitivity (Extended Mix)"	Ralph Tresvant	4:45
3.	"O.P.P"	Naughty by Nature	4:06
4.	"Right Here, Right Now"	Jesus Jones	2:58
5.	"Unbelievable"	EMF	3:27
6.	"I'm Too Sexy"	Right Said Fred	2:49
7.	"Strike It Up"	Black Box	4:32
8.	"Good Vibrations"	Marky Mark and the Funky Bunch	4:24
9.	"(I Wanna Give You) Devotion"	Nomad	5:00
10.	"The Whistle Song"	Frankie Knuckles	4:06
11.	"Mary Had a Little Boy"	Snap!	4:32
12.	"Killer"	Adamski	4:46
13.	"Please Don't Go (Sunshine Mix)"	KWS	4:39
14.	"Nu Nu"	Lidell Townsell	4:29
15.	"Doin' the Do"	Betty Boo	3:20
16.	"Twilight Zone"	2 Unlimited	4:56
17.	"Get Ready for This"	2 Unlimited	4:43

=== Dance Mix '93 ===
X-Tendamix Dance Mix '93

Compilation album by Various
- Released: August 3, 1993
- Label: Quality Music

Various chronology
X-Tendamix Dance Mix '92 (1992)	X-Tendamix Dance Mix '93 (1993)	Much Dance Mix '94 (1994)

No.	Title	Artist	Length
1.	"We Are Family (We All Into Love - Ragga Club Mix)"	Unit 3	3:47
2.	"Humpin' Around"	Bobby Brown	4:32
3.	"Jump Around"	House Of Pain	3:09
4.	"Gonna Make You Sweat (Everybody Dance Now)"	C+C Music Factory	3:55
5.	"3 a.m. Eternal (Live at the S.S.L. Extended Mix)"	The KLF	4:48
6.	"Took My Love"	Bizarre Inc (featuring Angie Brown)	3:37
7.	"Move This"	Technotronic	5:02
8.	"Rhythm Is a Dancer (12" Mix)"	Snap!	4:53
9.	"Take Me In Your Arms"	Lil' Suzy	4:34
10.	"I Will Always Love You (Classic Mix)"	Sarah Washington	4:40
11.	"Whoomp! (There It Is)"	Tag Team	3:57
12.	"Tribal Dance"	2 Unlimited	4:18
13.	"No Limit"	2 Unlimited	3:41
14.	"It's My Life (Extended Radio Mix)"	Dr. Alban	4:47
15.	"Are You Ready to Fly (Kaleidoscope Mix)"	Rozalla	5:03
16.	"Living In Ecstacy (House Mix)"	BKS	5:18
17.	"People Everyday"	Arrested Development	4:02

- Sold 700,000 units by September, 1994.

=== Dance Mix '94 ===
Much Dance Mix '94

Compilation album by Various
- Released: August 2, 1994
- Label: Quality Music

Various chronology
Much Dance Mix '93 (1993)	Much Dance Mix '94 (1994)	Much Dance Mix '95 (1995)

No.	Title	Artist	Length
1.	"Return to Innocence"	Engima	3:58
2.	"More & More"	Captain Hollywood Project	3:42
3.	"I Like to Move It (Erick "More" Club Mix)"	Reel 2 Real (featuring The Mad Stuntman)	4:34
4.	"Love Sex Intelligence"	The Shamen	4:00
5.	"I'm Gonna Get You (Original Flavor Mix)"	Bizarre Inc	5:06
6.	"Give It Up"	The Goodmen	5:32
7.	"Shoop"	Salt 'N' Pepa	3:32
8.	"Informer"	Snow	3:57
9.	"Show Me Love (Stonebridge Club Mix)"	Robin S.	4:31
10.	"Finally"	Ce Ce Peniston	3:07
11.	"I'm in Love with You (Original Mix)"	BKS	3:00
12.	"The Real Thing (If I Can't Have You) (Original Dance Mix)"	Tony Di Bart	5:08
13.	"Feels Like Heaven (Extended to the Max Mix)"	Urban Cookie Collective	5:13
14.	"The Rhythm of the Night"	Corona	4:36
15.	"Get-A-Way (2AM Club Mix)"	MAXX	4:43
16.	"The Real Thing"	2 Unlimited	3:50

=== Dance Mix '95 ===
Much Dance Mix '95

Compilation album by Various
- Released: August 1, 1995
- Label: Quality Music

Various chronology
Much Dance Mix '94 (1994)	Much Dance Mix '95 (1995)	Much Dance Mix '96 (1996)

No.	Title	Artist	Length
1.	"Saturday Night (Nite Mix)"	Whigfield	4:27
2.	"Dreamer (Original Club Mix)"	Livin' Joy	4:23
3.	"Tell Me You Love Me (Frankfurt Ambient Mix)"	Carol Medina	5:25
4.	"You & I (Club Remix)"	J.K.	4:18
5.	"Take Control (Matrix Extended Mix)"	BKS	6:03
6.	"In My Dreams (Nightmare Mix)"	Darkness	4:59
7.	"Every Shade of Blue (Radio Version)"	Bananarama	3:49
8.	"Total Eclipse of the Heart (7" Edit)"	Nicki French	3:43
9.	"Close to You (Close to Ragga Remix)"	Fun Factory	4:41
10.	"Set You Free (Amsterdam Mix)"	N-Trance	4:18
11.	"This Is the Night (Club Mix)"	New System	4:13
12.	"Move It to the Rhythm (Radio Mix)"	Technotronic	3:15
13.	"1-2-3! (Train with Me) (Radio Mix)"	Playahitty	3:35
14.	"Macarena (Mar Fe Mix)"	Los del Mar	4:48
15.	"Spend the Day (Original 7")"	Urban Cookie Collective	4:03
16.	"Dreams (Will Come Alive)"	2 Brothers on the 4th Floor	4:10
17.	"What Is Love (7" Mix)"	Haddaway	3:51

=== Dance Mix '96 ===
Much Dance Mix '96

Compilation album by Various
- Released: August 6, 1996
- Label: Quality Music

Various chronology
Much Dance Mix '95 (1995)	Much Dance Mix '96 (1996)	Dance Mix '97 (1997)

1. Culture Beat – "Inside Out"
2. BKS – "Astroplane"
3. Planet Soul – "Feel The Music"
4. Gusto – "Disco's Revenge"
5. Cartouche – "Feel The Rain"
6. Fun Factory – "I Wanna B With U"
7. Wil Veloz – "Guantanamera"
8. Pizzaman – "Happiness"
9. Full Intention – "America (I Love America)"
10. Reel 2 Real – "Are You Ready For Some More?"
11. Shaggy – "Boombastic"
12. Coolio – "Too Hot"
13. Maria-Lisa – "You Make Me Feel"
14. Emjay – "In Your Arms"
15. Capital Sound – "Feel The Rhythm"
16. Virtualmismo – "Last Train To Universe"
17. Urban Cookie Collective – "Witness"

=== Dance Mix '97 ===
Dance Mix '97

Compilation album by Various
- Released: August 5, 1997
- Label: Quality Music

Various chronology
Much Dance Mix '96 (1996)	Dance Mix '97 (1997)	Much Dance 1998 (1997)

1. Spice Girls – "Say You'll Be There"
2. Backstreet Boys – "We've Got It Goin' On"
3. Byron Stingly – "Get Up"
4. Full Intention – "Shake Your Body(Down To The Ground)"
5. Ultra Naté – "Free"
6. Pulse (Featuring the voice of Antoinette Roberson) – "Shadows Of The Past"
7. The People Movers – "C Lime Woman"
8. Ebony(Featuring Sensi and Phoebe 1) – "If I Change My Mind" (Fyx Mix)
9. A Tribe Called Quest – "1nce Again"
10. Blue Boy – "Remember Me" (Sure is Pure 7" Edit)
11. Fruit De La Passion – "Tic Tic Tac"
12. Brainbug – "Nightmare"
13. Sash! – "Encore Une Fois"
14. Clueless – "Don't Speak"

=== MuchDance 1997 ===
MuchDance 1997

Compilation album by Various
- Released: November 11, 1997
- Label: Sony BMG Music

Various chronology
Dance Mix '98 (1997)	MuchDance 1997 (1997)	MuchDance 1999 (1998)

1. The Notorious B.I.G. – "Hypnotize"
2. LL Cool J – "Doin' It"
3. Wyclef Jean – "We Trying to Stay Alive"
4. Robyn – "Do You Know (What It Takes)"
5. Savage Garden – "I Want You"
6. Hanson – "MMMBop"
7. Puff Daddy featuring Faith Evans & 112 – "I'll Be Missing You"
8. Unique II – "Break My Stride"
9. Jet Fuel – "Hang On! Here We Go"
10. U2 – "Discothèque"
11. Diana King – "I Say a Little Prayer"
12. The Cardigans – "Love Fool"
13. Backstreet Boys – "Quit Playing Games (With My Heart)"
14. OMC – "How Bizarre"
15. Love Inc. – "Broken Bones"
16. DJ Company – "Rhythm Of Love"
17. KRS-One – "Step Into A World"

Note: Was certified 6× Platinum (600,000 units) in Canada on March 17, 1998.

=== MuchDance 1999 ===
MuchDance 1999

Compilation album by Various
- Released: November 10, 1998
- Label: Sony BMG Music

Various chronology
MuchDance 1997 (1997)	MuchDance 1999 (1998)	MuchDance 2000 (1999)

1. Backstreet Boys – "Everybody (Backstreet's Back)"
2. N-Trance – "Da Ya Think I'm Sexy? (Radio Edit)"
3. Ace of Base – "Cruel Summer"
4. 'N Sync – "Tearin' Up My Heart"
5. Celine Dion – "My Heart Will Go On (Tony Moran Mix)"
6. All Saints – "Never Ever (Booker T's Vocal Mix) Extended 12" Mix"
7. Ultra Naté – "Found a Cure (Full Intention Mix)"
8. Temperance featuring Lorraine Reid – "Hands of Time (Radio Mix)"
9. Destiny's Child featuring Wyclef Jean – "No, No, No Part 2"
10. Will Smith – "Just The Two Of Us"
11. Mase featuring Total – "What You Want"
12. R. Kelly featuring Keith Murray – "Home Alone (Radio Edit)"
13. Fatboy Slim – "The Rockafeller Skank"
14. Love Inc. – "You're a Superstar (City of Love Club Mix)"
15. Brian McKnight – "Anytime (Cibola Remix Edit)"
16. Swirl 360 – "Hey Now Now (Dance Pop Radio Edit)"
17. Savage Garden – "To the Moon and Back"

Note: Was certified 6× Platinum (600,000 units) in Canada on December 1, 1999.

=== MuchDance 2000 ===
MuchDance 2000

Compilation album by Various
- Released: November 9, 1999

Various chronology
MuchDance 1999 (1998)	MuchDance 2000 (1999)	MuchDance 2001 (2000)

1. Eminem – "My Name Is"
2. Jay-Z featuring Amil & Ja Rule – "Can I Get A..."
3. 702 – "Where My Girls At?"
4. Britney Spears – "...Baby One More Time"
5. Jennifer Lopez – "If You Had My Love"
6. Lauryn Hill – "Doo Wop (That Thing)"
7. BLACKstreet & Janet Jackson featuring Eve & Ja Rule – "Girlfriend/Boyfriend"
8. P. Diddy featuring Hurricane G – "P.E. 2000"
9. Len – "Steal My Sunshine"
10. Will Smith – "Miami"
11. TLC – "No Scrubs (Hi-Bias Dance Remix)"
12. Whitney Houston – "It's Not Right, But It's Okay (Thunderpuss Remix)"
13. Joée – "Arriba"
14. Ricky Martin – "Livin' La Vida Loca"
15. Vengaboys – "Boom, Boom, Boom, Boom!!"
16. The Boomtang Boys featuring Kim Esty – "Pictures"
17. Prozzäk – "Strange Disease"

Note: Was certified 7× Platinum (700,000 units) in Canada on October 10, 2000.

=== MuchDance 2001 ===
MuchDance 2001

Compilation album by Various
- Released: November 21, 2000

Various chronology
MuchDance 2000 (1999)	MuchDance 2001 (2000)	MuchDance 2002 (2001)

1. Destiny's Child – "Jumpin' Jumpin'"
2. Toni Braxton – "He Wasn't Man Enough"
3. 'N Sync – "It's Gonna Be Me"
4. S Club 7 – "S Club Party"
5. Pink – "There You Go"
6. Mariah Carey – "Heartbreaker (No Rap Version)"
7. Eminem – "The Real Slim Shady"
8. Sisqo – "Thong Song"
9. Enrique Iglesias – "Be With You"
10. Christina Aguilera – "I Turn To You (Thunderpuss Remix)"
11. Britney Spears – "Lucky (Jack D. Elliot Radio Mix)"
12. Vengaboys – "Shalala Lala"
13. Dr. Dre featuring Eminem – "Forgot About Dre"
14. Macy Gray – "I Try (Grand Style Remix)"
15. Rascalz featuring Barrington Levy & k-os – "Top Of The World"
16. Jet Fuel featuring Rob Base & DJ E-Z Rock – "Take This Party Higher"
17. Santana featuring The Product G&B – "Maria Maria (Wyclef Remix)"
18. soulDecision – "Ooh It's Kinda Crazy"
19. Backstreet Boys – "The One"
20. B4-4 – "Get Down"

Note: Was certified 7× Platinum (700,000 units) in Canada on October 22, 2001.

=== MuchDance 2002 ===
MuchDance 2002

Compilation album by Various
- Released: November 13, 2001

Various chronology
MuchDance 2001 (2000)	MuchDance 2002 (2001)	MuchDance 2003 (2002)

1. Destiny's Child – "Bootylicious"
2. Nelly featuring City Spud – "Ride Wit Me"
3. Jagged Edge featuring Nelly – "Where the Party At"
4. City High – "What Would You Do?"
5. Eve featuring Gwen Stefani – "Let Me Blow Ya Mind"
6. P. Diddy featuring Black Rob and Mark Curry – "Bad Boy For Life"
7. D12 – "Purple Hills"
8. Dido – "Thank You (Deep Dish Remix)"
9. O-Town – "All or Nothing"
10. Jamiroquai – "Little L"
11. Backstreet Boys featuring The Neptunes – "The Call" (Remix)
12. Jessica Simpson featuring Lil' Bow Wow – "Irresistible"
13. Sugar Jones – "How Much Longer"
14. Nelly Furtado – "Turn Off The Light"
15. Joe featuring Mystikal – "Stutter"
16. Jennifer Lopez – "Love Don't Cost A Thing"
17. 'N Sync – "Pop"

Note: Was certified 4× Platinum (400,000 units) in Canada on May 5, 2003.

=== MuchDance 2003 ===
MuchDance 2003

Compilation album by Various
- Released: November 26, 2002

Various chronology
MuchDance 2002 (2001)	MuchDance 2003 (2002)	MuchDance 2004 (2003)

1. Shakira – "Whenever, Wherever"
2. Nelly – "Hot In Herre"
3. Pink – "Don't Let Me Get Me (John Shanks Remix)"
4. Ashanti – "Foolish"
5. P. Diddy featuring Usher & Loon – "I Need a Girl (Part One)"
6. Jennifer Lopez featuring Nas – "I'm Gonna Be Alright (Track Masters Remix)"
7. 'N Sync featuring Nelly – "Girlfriend (The Neptunes Remix)"
8. Mario – "Just A Friend 2002"
9. Ja Rule featuring Ashanti – "Always On Time"
10. Rascalz – "Crazy World"
11. Glenn Lewis – "Don't You Forget It (Remix feat. Paul Cain and DJ Clue)"
12. Clipse featuring N.O.R.E., Birdman & Lil' Wayne – "Grindin'"
13. Swollen Members – "Bring It Home"
14. Moby – "We Are All Made Of Stars (Timo Maas Vocal Remix)"
15. Enrique Iglesias – "Escape (Giorgio Moroder & Gernando Garibay Club Mix)"
16. Destiny's Child – "Emotion (The Neptunes Remix)"
17. Artists For Warchild – "Keep The Beat"

Note: Was certified 2× Platinum (200,000 units) in Canada on February 18, 2004.

=== MuchDance 2004 ===
MuchDance 2004

Compilation album by Various
- Released: November 18, 2003

Various chronology
MuchDance 2003 (2002)	MuchDance 2004 (2003)	MuchDance 2005 (2004)

1. Beyoncé featuring Jay-Z – "Crazy In Love"
2. Justin Timberlake – "Rock Your Body"
3. 50 Cent – "In da Club"
4. Christina Aguilera – "Fighter"
5. Hilary Duff – "Why Not"
6. Kelly Clarkson – "Miss Independent"
7. Shawn Desman – "Spread My Wings"
8. Jennifer Lopez featuring LL Cool J – "All I Have"
9. Keshia Chanté – "Unpredictable"
10. R. Kelly – "Ignition (Remix)"
11. Ashanti – "Rock Wit U (Awww Baby)"
12. Lumidee – "Never Leave You (Uh Oooh, Uh Oooh)"
13. Nas – "I Can"
14. Joe Budden featuring Busta Rhymes – "Fire (Yes, Yes Y'all)"
15. Sean Paul – "Like Glue"
16. Swollen Members – "Watch This"
17. Artists For Warchild – "Life"

Note: Was certified 3× Platinum (300,000 units) in Canada on October 21, 2004.

=== MuchDance 2005 ===
MuchDance 2005

Compilation album by Various
- Released: November 30, 2004

Various chronology
MuchDance 2004 (2003)	MuchDance 2005 (2004)	MuchDance 2006 (2005)

1. The Black Eyed Peas – "Let's Get It Started"
2. Britney Spears – "Outrageous"
3. Beyoncé – "Naughty Girl"
4. Kanye West – "Jesus Walks"
5. Jay-Z – "Dirt off Your Shoulder"
6. D12 – "How Come"
7. OutKast – "Roses"
8. Hilary Duff & Haylie Duff – "Our Lips Are Sealed"
9. Ashlee Simpson – "Pieces Of Me"
10. Jennifer Lopez featuring R. Kelly – "Baby I Luv U!"
11. Christina Milian featuring Fabolous – "Dip It Low"
12. Keshia Chanté – "Bad Boy"
13. Mario Winans featuring P. Diddy & Enya – "I Don't Wanna Know"
14. Terror Squad – "Lean Back"
15. Lloyd Banks – "On Fire"
16. Nina Sky featuring Jabba – "Move Ya Body"
17. Jessica Simpson – "Take My Breath Away (Eddie Biaz remix)"
18. Fefe Dobson – "Truth Anthem"

Note: Was certified 2× Platinum (200,000 units) in Canada on March 29, 2005.

=== MuchDance 2006 ===
MuchDance 2006

Compilation album by Various
- Released: November 15, 2005

Various chronology
MuchDance 2005 (2004)	MuchDance 2006 (2005)	MuchDannce 2007 (2006)

1. The Black Eyed Peas – "Don't Phunk With My Heart"
2. Gwen Stefani – "Hollaback Girl"
3. The Pussycat Dolls featuring Busta Rhymes – "Don't Cha"
4. Ciara featuring Ludacris – "Oh"
5. Eminem – "Mockingbird"
6. Usher with Alicia Keys – "My Boo"
7. Destiny's Child – "Girl"
8. Ludacris featuring Bobby Valentino – "Pimpin' All Over the World"
9. The Game – "Dreams"
10. Lindsay Lohan – "Over"
11. Jesse McCartney featuring Fabolous – "She's No You" (Remix)
12. Natasha Bedingfield – "These Words"
13. Tony Yayo featuring 50 Cent – "So Seductive"
14. Will Smith – "Switch"
15. Shawn Desman – "Let's Go"
16. Jully Black featuring Demarco – "Sweat Of Your Brow"
17. Frankie J. – "How To Deal" (Luny Tunes Reggaeton Remix)
18. Keshia Chanté – "Ring The Alarm"

Note: Was certified 2× Platinum (200,000 units) in Canada on May 31, 2006.

=== MuchDance 2007 ===
MuchDance 2007

Compilation album by Various
- Released: November 7, 2006

Various chronology
MuchDance 2006 (2005)	MuchDance 2007 (2006)	MuchDance 2008 (2007)

1. Fergie – "London Bridge"
2. Chris Brown – "Yo (Excuse Me Miss) (South Rakkas Reggaeton Mix)"
3. Christina Aguilera – "Ain't No Other Man"
4. Nelly Furtado featuring Timbaland – "Promiscuous"
5. The Pussycat Dolls featuring Snoop Dogg – "Buttons"
6. The Black Eyed Peas – "Pump It"
7. Chamillionaire featuring Krayzie Bone – "Ridin'"
8. Busta Rhymes – "Touch It"
9. Pharrell featuring Gwen Stefani – "Can I Have It Like That"
10. Shakira featuring Wyclef Jean – "Hips Don't Lie"
11. Beyoncé – "Check On It"
12. Kelis featuring Too $hort – "Bossy"
13. Pink – "Stupid Girls"
14. Jessica Simpson – "A Public Affair"
15. Kelly Clarkson – "Walk Away"
16. Mobile – "Out Of My Head (Claude LeGouche Edit)"
17. Rihanna – "S.O.S. (Rescue Me)" (Nevin's Future - Retro Edit)"
18. Mylo – "Mars Needs Women"

=== MuchDance 2008 ===
MuchDance 2008

Compilation album by Various
- Released: November 20, 2007

Various chronology
MuchDance 2007 (2006)	MuchDance 2008 (2007)	MuchDance 2009 (2008)

1. Justin Timberlake – "LoveStoned / I Think She Knows"
2. Hilary Duff – "Stranger"
3. Nelly Furtado – "Do It"
4. Kat DeLuna featuring Elephant Man – "Whine Up"
5. will.i.am – "I Got It From My Mama"
6. Sean Kingston – "Beautiful Girls"
7. Gwen Stefani featuring Damian "Jr. Gong" Marley – "Now That You Got It"
8. Belly featuring Ginuwine – "Pressure"
9. Fergie featuring Sean Kingston – "Big Girls Don't Cry (Personal)" (Remix)
10. Timbaland featuring Nelly Furtado & Justin Timberlake – "Give It To Me"
11. T-Pain featuring Yung Joc – "Buy U A Drank (Shawty Snappin')"
12. Rihanna featuring Jay-Z – "Umbrella"
13. Kanye West – "Can't Tell Me Nothing"
14. 50 Cent – "Amusement Park"
15. Christina Aguilera – "Candyman"
16. Avril Lavigne featuring Lil' Mama – "Girlfriend" (Remix)
17. Tiga – "You Gonna Want Me"
18. Pink – "U + Ur Hand"

Note: Was certified Platinum (100,000 units) in Canada on July 27, 2009.

=== MuchDance 2009 ===
MuchDance 2009

Compilation album by Various
- Released: November 11, 2008

Various chronology
MuchDance 2008 (2007)	MuchDance 2009 (2008)	MuchDance 2010 (2009)

1. Rihanna – "Disturbia"
2. Lady Gaga featuring Colby O'Donis – "Just Dance (HCCR's Bambossa Remix)"
3. The Pussycat Dolls – "When I Grow Up (Ralphi Rosario Radio Remix)"
4. Ne-Yo – "Closer"
5. Chris Brown – "Forever"
6. Britney Spears – "Break The Ice"
7. Danny Fernandes featuring Belly – "Private Dancer"
8. Classified – "Hard To be Hip Hop"
9. Kanye West featuring Dwele – "Flashing Lights"
10. Girlicious – "Like Me"
11. Leona Lewis – "Bleeding Love"
12. Jordin Sparks featuring Chris Brown – "No Air (DJ Swerve Remix)"
13. Shiloh – "Operator (A Girl Like Me)"
14. Avril Lavigne – "The Best Damn Thing"
15. Metro Station – "Shake It"
16. Lil Wayne featuring Static Major – "Lollipop"
17. Usher featuring Young Jeezy – "Love In This Club (Reavers Remix)"

Note: Was certified 2× Platinum (160,000 units) in Canada on March 9, 2009.

=== MuchDance 2010 ===
MuchDance 2010

Compilation album by Various
- Released: November 10, 2009

Various chronology
MuchDance 2009 (2008)	MuchDance 2010 (2009)	MuchDance 2011 (2010)

1. The Black Eyed Peas – "I Gotta Feeling"
2. Sean Kingston – "Fire Burning"
3. Pitbull – "Hotel Room Service"
4. Cascada – "Evacuate The Dancefloor"
5. Classified – "Anybody Listening"
6. Kelly Clarkson – "I Do Not Hook Up (Bimbo Jones Remix)"
7. David Guetta featuring Kelly Rowland – "When Love Takes Over"
8. Jonas Brothers – "Paranoid (Soul Seekers Remix)"
9. Katy Perry – "Waking Up In Vegas (Manhattan Clique Remix)"
10. Britney Spears – "If U Seek Amy"
11. P!nk – "Funhouse"
12. Wale featuring Lady Gaga – "Chillin'"
13. Ciara featuring Justin Timberlake – "Love Sex Magic"
14. Lady Gaga – "Paparazzi"
15. Misstress Barbara featuring Sam Roberts – "I'm Running (Radio Mix)"
16. Stereos featuring J. Paris – "Throw Ya Hands Up"
17. Belly featuring Snoop Dogg – "Hot Girl"

Note: Was certified 2× Platinum (160,000 units) in Canada on March 31, 2010.

=== MuchDance 2011 ===
MuchDance 2011

Compilation album by Various
- Released: November 2, 2010

Various chronology
MuchDance 2010 (2009)	MuchDance 2011 (2010)	MuchDance 2012 (2011)

1. Usher featuring Pitbull – "DJ Got Us Fallin' In Love"
2. Katy Perry – "Teenage Dream (Vandalism Le Pop Mix)"
3. Enrique Iglesias featuring Pitbull – "I Like It"
4. Adam Lambert – "If I Had You"
5. Justin Bieber – "Somebody to Love"
6. Flo Rida featuring David Guetta – "Club Can't Handle Me"
7. Jay Sean featuring Nicki Minaj – "2012 (It Ain't the End)"
8. Far East Movement featuring The Cataracs and Dev – "Like A G6"
9. Ke$ha – "Your Love Is My Drug"
10. Taio Cruz – "Dynamite"
11. Lady Gaga – "Eh, Eh (Nothing Else I Can Say)"
12. Dragonette – "Easy (Buffet Libre Remix)"
13. Selena Gomez & the Scene – "Round and Round"
14. Mike Posner – "Cooler Than Me"
15. Fefe Dobson – "Ghost"
16. Nicki Minaj featuring will.i.am – "Check It Out"

=== MuchDance 2012 ===
MuchDance 2012

Compilation album by Various
- Released: November 8, 2011

Various chronology
MuchDance 2011 (2010)	MuchDance 2012 (2011)	MuchDance 2013 (2012)

1. LMFAO featuring Lauren Bennett and GoonRock – "Party Rock Anthem"
2. Pitbull – "Give Me Everything"
3. Britney Spears – "I Wanna Go"
4. David Guetta featuring Nicki Minaj and Flo Rida – "Where Them Girls At"
5. Maroon 5 featuring Christina Aguilera – "Moves Like Jagger"
6. Lady Gaga – "The Edge of Glory"
7. Cobra Starship featuring Sabi – "You Make Me Feel..."
8. The Black Eyed Peas – "Don't Stop the Party"
9. Foster the People – "Pumped Up Kicks (Gigamesh Remix)"
10. Beyoncé – "Run the World (Girls) (Billionaire Remix)"
11. Nicki Minaj – "Super Bass"
12. Kay – "My Name Is Kay"
13. Anjulie – "Brand New Chick"
14. Selena Gomez & The Scene – "Love You Like a Love Song"
15. Rihanna – "Cheers (Drink to That)"
16. Chris Brown – "She Ain't You"

Note: Was certified 2× Platinum (160,000 units) in Canada on February 27, 2013.

=== MuchDance 2013 ===
MuchDance 2013

Compilation album by Various
- Released: November 6, 2012

Various chronology
MuchDance 2012 (2011)	MuchDance 2013 (2012)	MuchDance 2014' (2013)

1. PSY – "Gangnam Style"
2. Nicki Minaj – "Pound the Alarm"
3. Katy Perry – "Wide Awake (Kaskade Radio Edit)"
4. David Guetta featuring Chris Brown and Lil Wayne – "I Can Only Imagine"
5. Pitbull – "Back in Time"
6. Usher – "Scream"
7. Chris Brown – "Don't Wake Me Up"
8. Ne-Yo – "Let Me Love You (Until You Learn to Love Yourself)"
9. Demi Lovato – "Give Your Heart a Break (The Alias Radio Edit)"
10. Nikki Williams – "Glowing"
11. Ellie Goulding – "Lights (Fernando Garibay Remix)"
12. P!nk – "Blow Me (One Last Kiss)"
13. Flo Rida – "Whistle"
14. Maroon 5 – "One More Night"
15. One Direction – "One Thing"
16. Drake featuring Lil Wayne – "The Motto"
17. Justin Bieber featuring Big Sean – "As Long As You Love Me"

Note: Was certified Platinum (80,000 units) in Canada on December 23, 2014.

=== MuchDance 2014 ===
MuchDance 2014

Compilation album by Various
- Released: November 5, 2013

Various chronology
MuchDance 2013 (2012)	MuchDance 2014 (2013)	MuchDance 2015 (2014)

1. Robin Thicke featuring Pharrell – "Blurred Lines (No Rap Version)"
2. Avicii – "Wake Me Up"
3. Miley Cyrus – "We Can't Stop"
4. Selena Gomez – "Come & Get It"
5. Justin Timberlake – "Mirrors"
6. Lady Gaga – "Applause"
7. Drake featuring Majid Jordan – "Hold On, We're Going Home"
8. Classified featuring David Myles – "Inner Ninja"
9. Bruno Mars – "Treasure"
10. Emblem3 – "Chloe (You're the One I Want)"
11. David Guetta featuring Ne-Yo and Akon – "Play Hard"
12. Lana Del Rey – "Summertime Sadness (Cedric Gervais Remix)"
13. Calvin Harris featuring Ayah Marar – "Thinking About You"
14. PRTY H3RO – "Life of the PRTY"
15. Bonnie McKee – "American Girl"
16. Ellie Goulding – "Burn"

Note: Was certified Platinum (80,000 units) in Canada on August 27, 2014.

=== MuchDance 2015 ===
MuchDance 2015

Compilation album by Various
- Released: November 4, 2014

Various chronology
MuchDance 2014 (2013)	MuchDance 2015 (2014)	MuchDance 2016 (2015)

1. Meghan Trainor – "All About That Bass"
2. Maroon 5 – "Maps"
3. Ariana Grande featuring Iggy Azalea – "Problem"
4. Iggy Azalea featuring Charli XCX – "Fancy"
5. Ed Sheeran – "Sing"
6. Nicki Minaj – "Anaconda"
7. Jessie J featuring Ariana Grande and Nicki Minaj – "Bang Bang"
8. Pitbull featuring John Ryan – "Fireball"
9. MAGIC! – "Rude (Zedd Remix)"
10. Sia – "Chandelier (Liam Keegan Radio Edit)"
11. Calvin Harris – "Summer"
12. Katy Perry – "Birthday (Cash Cash Radio Mix)"
13. Shawn Hook – "Million Ways (Hi Class Weapon Remix)"
14. Kiesza – "Hideaway"
15. Disclosure featuring Sam Smith – "Latch"
16. Pharrell Williams – "Happy"

Note: Was certified Platinum (80,000 units) in Canada on March 16, 2015.

=== MuchDance 2016 ===
MuchDance 2016

Compilation album by Various
- Released: November 13, 2015

Various chronology
MuchDance 2015 (2014)	MuchDance 2016 (2015)	MuchDance 2017 (2016)

1. Calvin Harris & Disciples – "How Deep Is Your Love"
2. Hailee Steinfeld – "Love Myself"
3. WALK THE MOON – "Shut Up and Dance"
4. R. City – "Locked Away (featuring. Adam Levine)"
5. Major Lazer & DJ Snake – "Lean On (featuring. MØ)"
6. Maroon 5 – "This Summer's Gonna Hurt Like a Motherfucker"
7. Fifth Harmony – "Worth It (featuring. Kid Ink)"
8. Rachel Platten – "Fight Song (Dave Aude Remix)"
9. Demi Lovato – "Cool For The Summer"
10. Pitbull – "Fun (featuring. Chris Brown)"
11. Ed Sheeran – "Photograph (Felix Jaehn Remix)"
12. X Ambassadors – "Renegades (Stash Konig Remix)"
13. Zedd – "Beautiful Now (featuring. Jon Bellion)"
14. David Guetta – "Hey Mama (featuring. Nicki Minaj, Bebe Rexha & Afrojack)"
15. Selena Gomez – "Good For You (featuring. A$AP Rocky)"
16. Silentó – "Watch Me (Whip / Nae Nae)"

=== MuchDance 2017 ===
MuchDance 2017

Compilation album by Various
- Released: November 11, 2016

Various chronology
MuchDance 2016 (2015)	MuchDance 2017 (2016)

1. Major Lazer featuring Justin Bieber & MØ – "Cold Water"
2. DJ Snake featuring Justin Bieber – "Let Me Love You"
3. Sia featuring Sean Paul – "Cheap Thrills"
4. P!nk – "Just Like Fire (Wideboys Remix)"
5. The Chainsmokers featuring Daya – "Don't Let Me Down"
6. Shawn Mendes – "Treat You Better"
7. Fifth Harmony featuring Ty Dolla $ign – "Work from Home"
8. Ariana Grande – "Into You"
9. Meghan Trainor – "Me Too"
10. Kungs & Cookin' on 3 Burners – "This Girl"
11. Ruth B – "Lost Boy (Cotone Remix)"
12. Charlie Puth featuring Selena Gomez – "We Don't Talk Anymore"
13. Tove Lo – "Cool Girl"
14. Tory Lanez – "LUV"
15. Alan Walker – "Faded"
16. Britney Spears featuring G-Eazy – "Make Me..."

=== MuchDance 2018 ===
MuchDance 2018

Compilation album by Various
- Released: November 17, 2017

Various chronology
MuchDance 2017 (2016)	MuchDance 2018 (2017)

1. P!nk – "What About Us"
2. Katy Perry – "Swish Swish"
3. Shawn Mendes – "There's Nothing Holdin' Me Back (NOTD Remix)"
4. Selena Gomez – "Fetish (Galantis Remix)"
5. Imagine Dragons – "Believer (Kaskade Remix)"
6. Khalid featuring Marshmello – "Silence (Tiestos Big Room Remix)"
7. French Montana – "Unforgettable"
8. Calvin Harris – "Feels"
9. J Balvin featuring Willy William – "Mi Gente"
10. Camila Cabello – "Havana"
11. Liam Payne – "Strip That Down"
12. Zedd featuring Liam Payne – "Get Low"
13. OneRepublic featuring SeeB – "Rich Love"
14. Khalid – "Young, Dumb & Broke"
15. Demi Lovato – "Sorry Not Sorry"
16. Kesha – "Praying (Frank Walker Remix)"

=== MuchDance 2019 ===
MuchDance 2019

Compilation album by Various
- Released: November 30, 2018

Various chronology
MuchDance 2018 (2017)	MuchDance 2019 (2018)

1. Ariana Grande – "No Tears Left To Cry"
2. Calvin Harris featuring Dua Lipa – "One Kiss"
3. Imagine Dragons – "Thunder"
4. The Weeknd featuring Kendrick Lamar – "Pray For Me"
5. The Chainsmokers – "Side Effects"
6. Bebe Rexha featuring Florida Georgia Line – "Meant To Be"
7. 5 Seconds of Summer – "Youngblood"
8. Loud Luxury – "Love No More"
9. Jonas Blue featuring Jack & Jack – "Rise"
10. Migos – "Stir Fry"
11. Martin Garrix featuring Khalid – "Ocean"
12. Tiesto featuring Dzeko, Preme, and Post Malone – "Jackie Chan"
13. Khalid featuring Normani – "Love Lies"
14. Clean Bandit featuring Demi Lovato – "Solo"
15. Dennis Lloyd – "Nevermind"
16. bülow – "Not a Love Song"
17. Tyler Shaw – "Cautious"

=== MuchDance 2020 ===
MuchDance 2020

Compilation album by Various
- Released: November 15, 2019

Various chronology
MuchDance 2019 (2018)	MuchDance 2020 (2019)

Unmixed Album

1. Lil Nas X featuring Billy Ray Cyrus – "Old Town Road"
2. Ariana Grande – "Break Up with Your Girlfriend, I'm Bored"
3. The Chainsmokers & Illenium featuring Lennon Stella – "Takeaway"
4. Jonas Brothers – "Sucker"
5. Loud Luxury & Bryce Vine – "I'm Not Alright"
6. Shawn Mendes – "If I Can't Have You"
7. Ellie Goulding, Diplo & Swae Lee – "Close to Me"
8. Y2K & bbno$ – "Lalala"
9. Sam Smith & Normani – "Dancing With a Stranger"
10. Khalid – "Talk"
11. Kygo & Whitney Houston – "Higher Love"
12. Regard – "Ride It"
13. Mabel – "Don't Call Me Up"
14. Martin Garrix featuring Macklemore and Patrick Stump – "Summer Days"
15. Mark Ronson featuring Camila Cabello – "Find U Again"
16. Famba – "Swear To God"

=== MuchDance 2021 ===
MuchDance 2021

Compilation album by Various
- Released: November 20, 2020

Various chronology
MuchDance 2020 (2019)	MuchDance 2021 (2020)	MuchDance 2022 (2021)

1. Lady Gaga featuring Ariana Grande – "Rain On Me"
2. Saint Jhn – "Roses (Imanbek Remix)"
3. Jawsh 685 featuring Jason Derulo – "Savage Love (Laxed - Siren Beat)"
4. Topic featuring A7S – "Breaking Me"
5. Katy Perry – "Daisies (Oliver Heldens Remix)"
6. Jonas Brothers featuring Karol G – "X"
7. Loud Luxury – "Cold Feet"
8. Lewis Capaldi – "Before You Go (Edessa Remix)"
9. Niall Horan featuring Diplo – "Nice to Meet Ya (Diplo Remix)"
10. Rosalía featuring Travis Scott – "TKN"
11. J. Balvin, Dua Lipa, Bad Bunny, and Tainy – "Un Día (One Day)"
12. Nea – "Some Say (Felix Jaehn Remix)"
13. 24kGoldn featuring Iann Dior – "Mood"
14. Surf Mesa and Topic featuring Emilee – "ILY (I Love You Baby) (Topic Remix)"
15. StaySolidRocky – "Party Girl"
16. Young T & Bugsey featuring Headie One – "Don't Rush"
17. Surfaces – "Sunday Best"
18. BENEE featuring Gus Dapperton – "Supalonely"

=== MuchDance 2022 ===
MuchDance 2022

Compilation album by Various
- Released: December 3, 2021

Various chronology
MuchDance 2021 (2020)	MuchDance 2022 (2021)

1. The Kid Laroi and Justin Bieber – "Stay"
2. Marshmello and Jonas Brothers - "Leave Before You Love Me"
3. Doja Cat - "Woman"
4. Justin Bieber feat. Daniel Caesar and Giveon - "Peaches"
5. Lil Nas X - "Thats What I Want"
6. Glass Animals - "Heat Waves"
7. Farruko - "Pepas"
8. Loud Luxury - "Holiday Hills"
9. Meduza feat. Dermot Kennedy - "Paradise"
10. Kane Brown x "Blackbear" - "Memory"
11. Tai Verdes - "A-O-K"
12. Chlöe - "Have Mercy"
13. Lost Frequencies, "Calum Scott - "Where Are You Now"
14. Young Bombs feat. JORDY - "Summer In Brooklyn"
15. Tyler Shaw - "When You're Home"

=== MuchDance #1's ===
MuchDance #1's

Compilation album by Various
- Released: December 12, 2006

Various chronology
MuchDance #1's (2006)	MuchDance #1's Volume 2 (2007)

1. Justin Timberlake featuring Clipse – "Like I Love You"
2. Kelis – "Milkshake"
3. The Black Eyed Peas – "My Humps"
4. Rihanna – "Pon De Replay"
5. Nelly – "Hot In Herre"
6. 50 Cent – "In Da Club"
7. Beyoncé featuring Jay-Z – "Crazy In Love"
8. Britney Spears – "Toxic"
9. Gwen Stefani – "What You Waiting For?"
10. The Killers – "Somebody Told Me"
11. Bodyrockers – "I Like The Way"
12. Pink – "Get The Party Started"
13. Kelly Clarkson – "Since U Been Gone"
14. Hilary Duff – "Come Clean"
15. Maroon 5 – "This Love"
16. Shaggy featuring RikRok – "It Wasn't Me"
17. Jagged Edge featuring Run – "Let's Get Married"
18. Outkast – "Hey Ya"

=== MuchDance #1's Volume 2 ===
MuchDance #1's

Compilation album by Various
- Released: December 18, 2007

Various chronology
MuchDance #1's (2006)	MuchDance #1's (2007)

1. Amerie – "1 Thing"
2. Chris Brown featuring Juelz Santana – "Run It!"
3. Sean Paul – "Get Busy"
4. Usher – "Caught Up"
5. Justin Timberlake featuring Timbaland – "SexyBack"
6. Daft Punk – "One More Time"
7. Ashlee Simpson – "Boyfriend"
8. Fergie featuring will.i.am – "Fergalicious"
9. Nelly Furtado – "Maneater" (Remix)
10. The Killers – "Mr. Brightside"
11. Mariah Carey – "Shake It Off"
12. k-os – "Crabbuckit"
13. Keshia Chanté – "2U"
14. 50 Cent featuring Olivia – "Candy Shop"
15. Snoop Dogg featuring Pharrell – "Drop It Like It's Hot"
16. Mary J. Blige – "Family Affair"
17. Mario – "Let Me Love You"
18. Ne-Yo – "So Sick"

=== MuchDance 90's ===
MuchDance 90's

Compilation album by Various
- Released: 2003

Various chronology
MuchDance 90's (2003)	MuchDance 80's (2004)

Disc 1:

1. Aqua – "Barbie Girl" (1997)
2. Real McCoy – "Another Night" (1994/1995)
3. Haddaway – "What Is Love" (1993)
4. MC Hammer- "U Can't Touch This" (1990)
5. C+C Music Factory – "Gonna Make You Sweat (Everybody Dance Now)" (1990/1991)
6. Spice Girls – "Wannabe" (1996/1997)
7. Ace of Base – "The Sign" (1993/1994)
8. SWV – "Right Here/Human Nature" (1993)
9. Snow – "Informer" (1992/1993)
10. Shaggy – "Oh Carolina" (1993)
11. Robin S. – "Show Me Love" (1990/1993)
12. Nightcrawlers – "Push The Feeling On (The Dub Of Doom)" (1992/1995)
13. Crystal Waters – "Gypsy Woman (She's Homeless)" (1991)
14. Faithless – "Insomnia (Armand's European Vacation Mix)" (1995)
15. Intonation featuring Joée – "(I Just) Died In Your Arms" (1993)

Disc 2:

1. Snap! – "Rhythm Is A Dancer" (1992)
2. Black Box – "Everybody Everybody" (1990)
3. Deee-Lite – "Groove Is In The Heart" (1990)
4. CeCe Peniston – "Finally" (1991/1992)
5. Vanilla Ice – "Ice Ice Baby" (1990)
6. Salt-N-Pepa – "Let's Talk About Sex" (1991)
7. Montell Jordan – "This Is How We Do It" (1995)
8. House of Pain – "Jump Around" (1992)
9. Ini Kamoze – "Here Comes The Hotstepper" (1994/1995)
10. Naughty by Nature – "Hip Hop Hooray" (1993)
11. DNA featuring Suzanne Vega – "Tom's Diner" (1990/1991)
12. The Movement – "Jump!" (1992)
13. Le Click – "Tonight Is The Night" (1995)
14. Culture Beat – "Mr. Vain" (1993)
15. Jam & Spoon – "Right in the Night (Fall in Love with Music)" (1996)

=== MuchDance 80's ===
MuchDance 80's

Compilation album by Various
- Released: November 30, 2004

Various chronology
MuchDance 90's (2003)	MuchDance 80's (2004)

Disc 1:

1. Wham! – "Wake Me Up Before You Go-Go" (1984)
2. Culture Club – "Karma Chameleon" (1983/1984)
3. Paula Abdul – "Straight Up" (1989)
4. New Kids On The Block – "You Got It (The Right Stuff)" (1989)
5. Bobby Brown – "My Prerogative" (1988/1989)
6. Grandmaster Flash & Melle Mel – "White Lines (Don't Do It)" (1987)
7. Rob Base & DJ E-Z Rock – "It Takes Two" (1988)
8. New Edition – "Cool It Now" (1984/1985)
9. Cameo – "Word Up" (1986)
10. M/A/R/R/S – "Pump Up The Volume" (1987)
11. Taylor Dayne – "Tell It To My Heart" (1987/1988)
12. Chaka Khan – "I Feel For You" (1984)
13. Jermaine Stewart – "We Don't Have To Take Our Clothes Off" (1986)
14. Sheila E. – "The Glamorous Life" (1984)
15. Debbie Gibson – "Only In My Dreams" (1987)

Disc 2:

1. Rick Astley – "Never Gonna Give You Up" (1987/1988)
2. Cyndi Lauper – "Girls Just Want To Have Fun" (1983/1984)
3. Dead Or Alive – "You Spin Me 'Round (Like A Record)" (1984/1985)
4. Salt-N-Pepa – "Push It" (1987/1988)
5. Aerosmith with Run-DMC – "Walk This Way" (1986)
6. DJ Jazzy Jeff & The Fresh Prince – "Parents Just Don't Understand" (1988)
7. Club Nouveau – "Lean On Me" (1987)
8. UB40 – "Red Red Wine" (1983)
9. Musical Youth – "Pass The Dutchie" (1982)
10. Jimmy Cliff – "Reggae Nights" (1983)
11. Bananarama – "Cruel Summer" (1983/1984)
12. Jody Watley – "Looking For A New Love" (1987)
13. Exposé – "Point Of No Return" (1987)
14. Rick James – "Give It To Me Baby" (1981)
15. Soul II Soul featuring Caron Wheeler – "Back To Life (However Do You Want Me)" (1989/1990)

Note: Was certified Gold (50,000 units) in Canada on June 13, 2005.

== See also ==
- Big Shiny Tunes
- MuchMusic: Outlaws & Heroes (album series)
