= Brampton Arts Walk of Fame =

Coordinates: 43°41′13.8″N 79°45′36.4″W

- Established: 2011
- Location: Rose Theatre Brampton
- Type: Civic hall of fame
- Public transit access: 1, 2, 501, 502
- Website: https://www1.brampton.ca/EN/Arts-Culture-Tourism/Cultural-Services/pages/arts-walk-of-fame.aspx

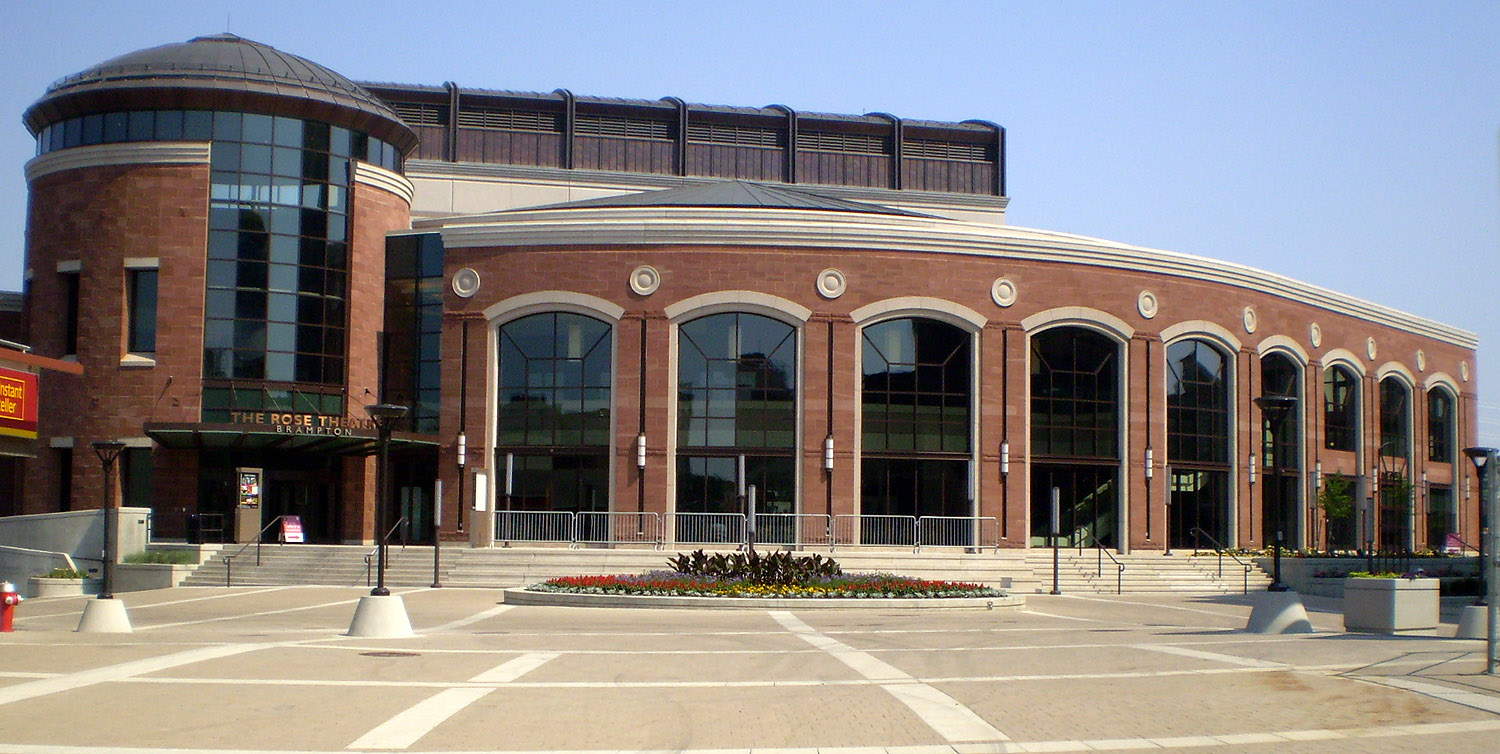
Rose Theatre Brampton, and Garden Square, which hosted the inaugural induction event.

The Brampton Arts Walk of Fame is an honours system located at the Rose Theatre Brampton, in Ontario, Canada. The first inductions took place in 2014, and include past and present residents of Brampton.

Launched in 2011 as the Brampton Walk of Fame, and later simply called Art Walk of Fame, initial inductees were guests to the city. These inductions have been depreciated beyond the initial event.

== Inductees ==
Since 2026, the inductees are:

	Name	Induction	Notes
	Rohinton Mistry	2014	Author
A man looks puzzled. You're not missing anything, this is a terrible picture of Mr. Peters.	Russell Peters	2014	Comedian, with a Brampton connection. He went to high school there.
	Scott Lale	2014	Theatre actor, writer, director
A man smiles widely to the camera.	Scott Thompson	2014	Comedian, Brampton-raised.
	Jack Reid	2014	Late artist
A young woman turns to look back at the camera.	Keshia Chanté	2014	Singer
A young man with matted hair.	Michael Cera	2014	Comedic actor
	Tanya Mullings	2015	
	Johnny Reid	2015	
An older man looks to the side.	Alan Thicke	2015	
	Gordon J. Smith	2015	
A woman sings into a microphone, her entire height shown.	Tara Oram	2015	
	Trey Anthony	2016	Playwright
A woman sings into the microphone.	Lee Aaron	2016	Rock vocalist
	Andy Donato	2016	Editorial cartoonist, artist
	Othalie Graham	2016	Opera singer
	Exco Levi	2016	Singer, songwriter
	William Perkins Bull	2017	Literary non-fiction
	Director X	2017	Director
	Rupi Kaur	2017	Poet
	Zarqa Nawaz	2017	Documentarian
	Ian Williams	2021	novelist, Giller Prize winner
	Denise Jones	2022	reggae producer
	Vinay Virmani	2024	
	The Carlton Showband	2024	
	Alessia Cara	2025	
	Ruth Ohi	2026	

A councillor has publicly asked for Sidhu Moose Wala's inclusion.

== History ==
=== Initial Walk plans ===
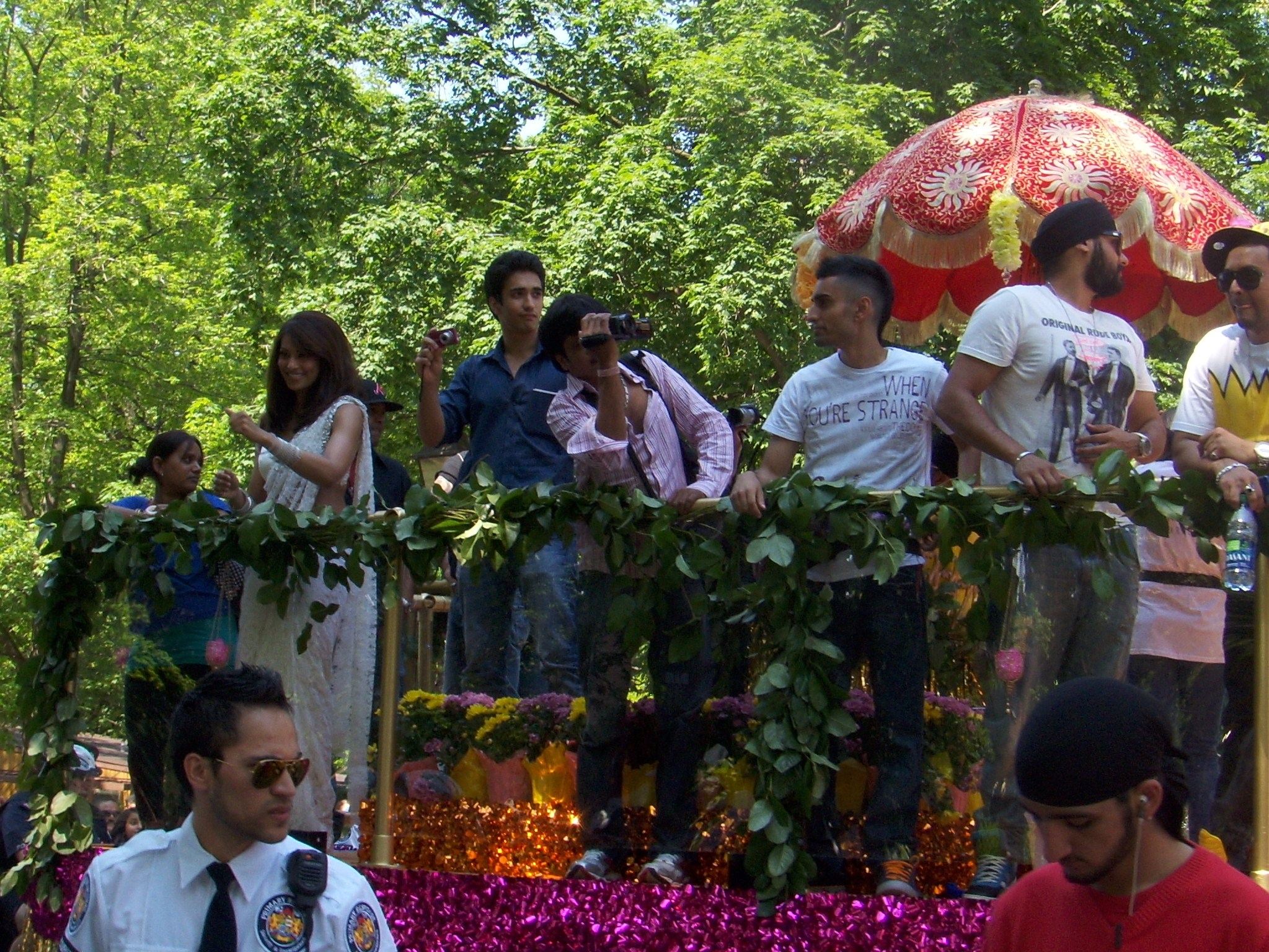
Bipasha Basu and RDB appear on the final float of the Flower City Parade, 2011, the day after the induction ceremony.

The walk was mentioned in an October 2008 planning document for the Brampton Arts Council, which suggested their executive director would be involved in establishing a criterion for inclusion, in co-operation with the Arts, Culture and Theatre Department of the City of Brampton (which manages the Rose Theatre). It suggested that city council approval would be needed. No city committee minutes or city council minutes posted on the City of Brampton website made any mention of the walk. A Brampton Guardian article listed the "honours Brampton citizens—both past and present—that have made significant contributions to the world of arts and entertainment." The article claims the walk was established in 2010.

The weekend before the IIFA Awards were presented in Toronto, Ontario, the City of Brampton hosted an event called "IIFA Buzz Brampton". Festivities included music, dance performances, a marketplace, and the retheming of the annual Flower City Parade. One event, announced shortly before the event and held June 17, was the creation of a walk of fame. Inductees would be Indian film star Bipasha Basu, and locally-residing musicians RDB and Nindy Kaur.

Publicity for the first induction claimed that it would be a private ceremony for VIPs only, the unveiling was public. Despite inducting two individuals and one group, the walk of fame is not yet "official" with the city, according to media reports. The ceremony was hosted by movie critic Mohit Rajhans of the neighbouring city of Mississauga, and actor, model, and activist Lisa Ray. While the unveiling ceremony was in the public square, most of the event was private.

In late 2011, the city was scheduled to induct Russell Peters as to become the first formal inductee to the Walk of Fame; nothing more was mentioned of that induction. (He has since been inducted into the actual Walk.)

==== Previous inductees ====
The following inductees were named during the Walk's first incarnation. They have never actually been placed on the Walk of Fame, or de-inducted.

	Name	Induction	Notes
	RDB and Nindy Kaur	2011-06-17 (Note: There is some doubt shed onto whether these inductees received full status on the walk. The Globe and Mail report on Basu's plaque unveiling says that RDB have "now been named the brand ambassadors for Brampton and received a plaque commemorating IIFA as well", (see Baluja, "Bollywood comes to Brampton to celebrate Indian diva", Globe and Mail) as opposed to other media reports which suggested they were full members of the Walk of Fame. (see "Artists get their fame", The Brampton Guardian.) The sample plaque shown during the ceremony specifically mentions IIFA Buzz Brampton, making it the same design as Basu's legacy plaque.)	Kaur and RDB co-founder Manj Ral are residents of Brampton. The British-Indian group RDB is said to blend Punjabi Bhangra and western music. Since the induction ceremony, RDB member Kuldeep died.
	Russell Peters	TBD (Note: As of January 2012, nothing further had been mentioned in The Brampton Guardian, the City's only mainstream media news source, or on the City of Brampton official website.)	Longtime resident of Brampton, who has a $20,000 scholarship at his former high school, is a high level donor to Brampton Civic Hospital, and is a 2011 inductee into Canada's Walk of Fame. In June 2011, it was announced that Peters would be inducted in the autumn of that year. He was to be the "first" inductee, despite Basu, Kaur, and RDB already having their own ceremonies.
	Raj Kapoor	TBD (Note: Only one media outlet reported this quote from Joseph, most only covered the planned street naming. It is not believed Asian Image has issued a correction to this report.)	The first Indian movie star to attain global popularity. The City previously announced a Raj Kapoor Crescent, in an unannounced location. During the June 8, 2011 Brampton City Council meeting, Mayor Susan Fennell noted that "the City is exploring how best to honour Mr. Kapoor"; a few days prior, Sabbas Joseph, director of IIFA owner Wizcraft had already announced the city was naming the street after Kapoor. The name was to express "the city's commitment to honouring the cinematic genius."
Basu, an adult woman poses on a red carpet.	Bipasha Basu	2011-06-17; Legacy plaque	Bipasha Basu was given a "legacy plaque" on the Brampton Walk of Fame on June 17, 2011. Basu had previously visited Canada, but had never been to Brampton before the induction. Reports prior to the unveiling suggested she was being included on the Walk of Fame as a full-level inductee. Most of the event coverage from out of town revolved around Basu; she was wearing AllSaints, when she walked the green carpet, and a white lace sari by Gaurav Gupta.

=== Interim discussion ===
The HACE Downtown Brampton Creative Economy Round Table, a committee of the City of Brampton, received correspondence in October 2012 from a Brampton resident which included mention of the Walk. In this December meeting, staff advised the committee that the corporation was working on developing a Walk, which would be discussed at a future Flower City Committee meeting. The Flower City Committee deemed that the walk "has existed for a long time", and would look into the status.

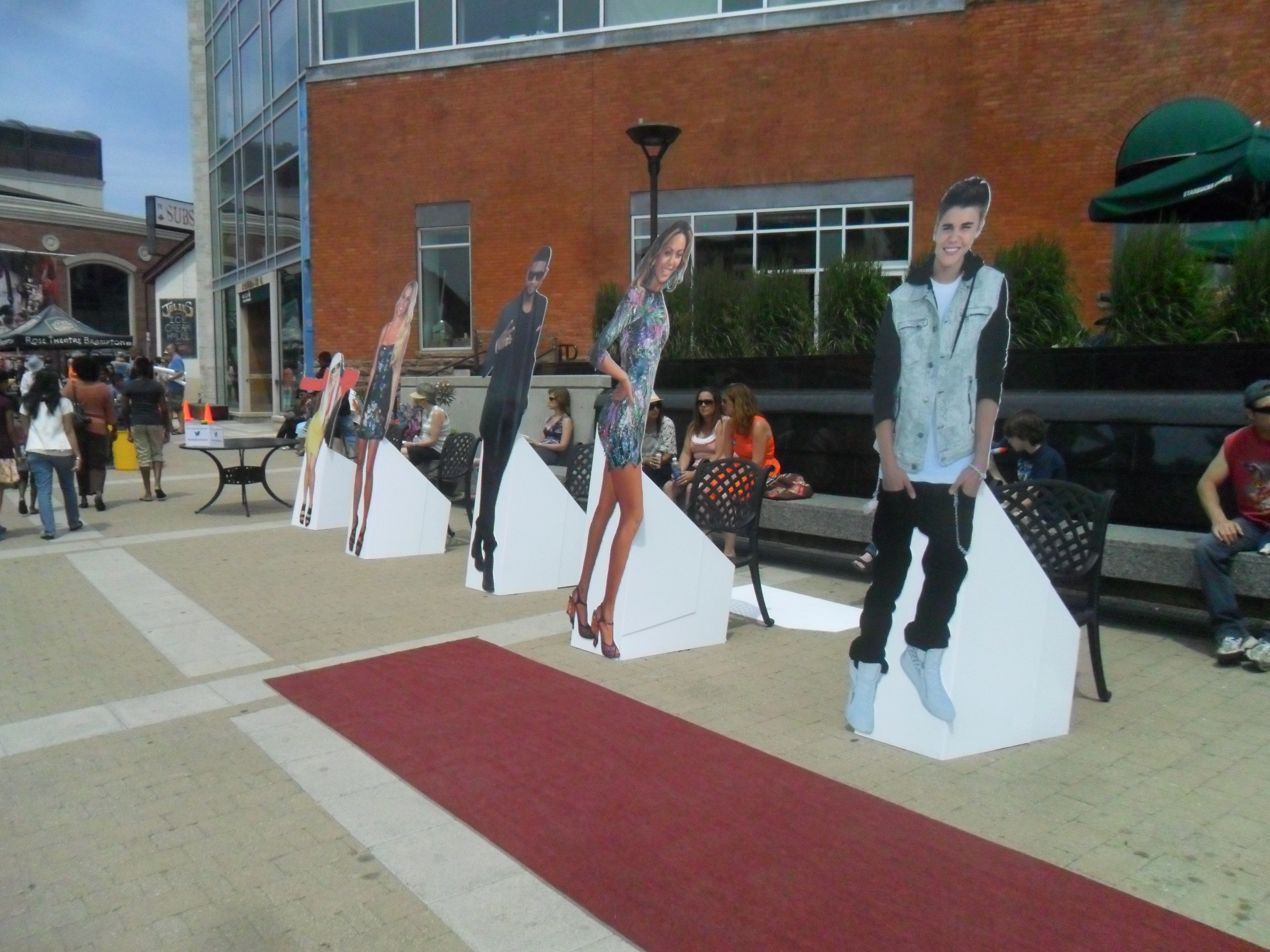
Standees at Celebrampton, 2013. The status of Lady Gaga, Usher, et al. in the Walk of Fame is unknown.

In 2013, Brampton Day (traditionally in September) was merged into the events held on the day of the Flower City Parade. Events included a "Walk of Fame", promising that you could "get your photo taken with your favourite star!" Larger-than-life cardboard cutouts of celebrities were posted along a red carpet. Celebrities were Lady Gaga, Britney Spears, Usher, Beyoncé, Justin Bieber, Christina Aguilera, Justin Timberlake, Katy Perry, and Adam Levine.

=== 2014 reboot ===
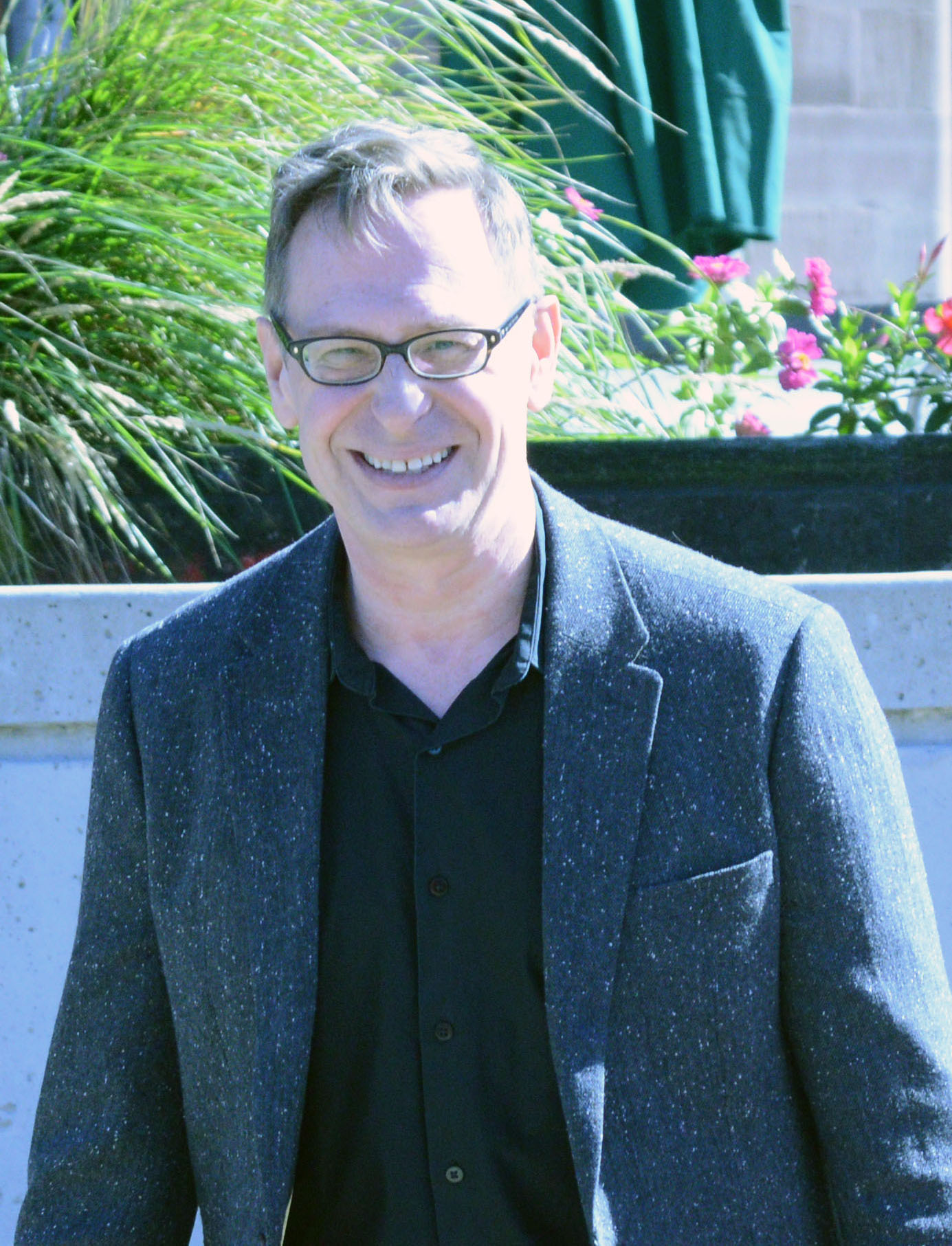
Thompson at the Brampton Arts Walk of Fame unveiling

A staff report was presented to the Committee of Council on September 18, dubbing the project the "Brampton Arts Walk of Fame"; the Committee of Council recommended acceptance, eligibility criteria, and the first inductees. The first event may be connected to an existing downtown event, "for financial and other reasons"; Councillor John Hutton suggested it would be unlikely to get the inductees to attend on a preset date. The Brampton Arts Council is on the Brampton Arts Walk of Fame Committee.

The established categories are performing arts, visual arts, media arts, literature, and creative arts. Inductees must have ten years in the arts and entertainment industry, and have been born in Brampton, a resident of Brampton, or an owner of a business in Brampton for a period of time.

The walk would be located in Garden Square at the Rose Theatre. Beginning in 2014, red granite plaques will be unveiled annually, featuring a star icon, award category, recipient's name, and the year of the award.

As of 2015, the City of Brampton considered selling sponsorship rights.

== Other civic honours ==
Other civic honours existed in Brampton before this "walk". The Brampton Sports Hall of Fame was created in 1979; when the Brampton Centre for Sports and Entertainment opened in 1999, it moved into the facility. In 2002 the City of Brampton Economic Development Office investigated the creation of a Brampton Business Walk of Fame. The council referred the concept to the Ambassador Committee "for consideration of a Virtual Walk of Fame." In 2005, the Brampton Indie Arts Festival included an induction ceremony for Canadian comedian Scott Thompson. Thompson is a member of comedy troupe The Kids in the Hall, which won the Rose d'Or and is on Canada's Walk of Fame. In 2011, the council was informed that the Flower City Strategy Committee was considering a Tree Hall of Fame.
