= Lonnie Szoke =

Canadian songwriter, producer (b. 1978)

- Born: February 9, 1978 (age 47); Brantford, Ontario, Canada
- Genres: R&B, Hip Hop, Pop
- Occupations: Record producer, songwriter
- Instruments: Piano, Guitar, Drums

Lonnie Szoke (born February 9, 1978) is a Canadian musician, songwriter and record producer, born and raised in Brantford, Ontario.

== Career ==
Szoke co-founded ILLFIRE Entertainment in 2003.

In 2004, he produced on Keshia Chanté's self-titled Juno Award-winning album. The single "Let The Music Take You" was nominated for R&B Song of the Year by the Urban Music Association of Canada. The album was certified gold in Canada in January 2005.

In 2006, he produced "Take Myself Away", the first single from reggae musician Sizzla's album Overstanding.

Szoke appeared on Degrassi Unscripted for his work with Drake, an actor/rapper from the Degrassi television series.

Other artists he has worked with include Beyoncé, Lil Wayne, Ne-Yo, Stargate, Keyshia Cole, 50 Cent, Simone Denny, Glenn Lewis, In Essence, Ray Robinson, Michie Mee, Ghetto Concept, Choclair, Toya Alexis, Belinda Brady, J-Logix, Mayhem Morearty, Hustlemann, Yonge C, Celtic Connection, Intonation, and Lina Fouro.
