= Night & Day (Keshia Chanté album) =

2011 studio album by Keshia Chanté

Studio album by Keshia Chanté
- Released: November 8, 2011
- Recorded: 2009–2011
- Genres: R&B, hip hop soul
- Length: 54:09
- Labels: tanjola, Universal Music Canada
- Producers: Mike Kiofos; Craig McConnell; Justin Forsley; Mark Cyrus; Alex Greggs; J-New; Rob Wells; Ryo Sukeimai; Anthony M Jones; Tommy Brown; Murray Daigle; Raynord Humphrey

Keshia Chanté chronology
2U (2006)	Night & Day (2011)	Unbound 01 (2017)

Singles from Night & Day
- 1. "Table Dancer" Released: October 12, 2010; 2. "Set U Free" Released: March 1, 2011; 3. "Shooting Star" Released: 2011; 4. "I Miss U" Released: May 24, 2012

Night & Day is the third studio album by Canadian recording artist Keshia Chanté. The album is her first release under Tanjola Brand management Inc and Universal Music Group. Recorrding sessions for the album began in 2007, a year after her 2006 release, 2U, under Sony Music Canada.

The album is a duo-album, with the 'Night' side (tracks 1–7) being dance-pop and the 'Day' side (tracks 8–14) being R&B. This is the first album that Keshia controlled the creative side of the album, writing 10 out of 14 songs and executive producing

== Background ==
Keshia's previous album 2U (2006) was a commercial success and received generally favorable reviews from most music critics. The album featured 4 singles—including the radio airplay Top 10 single "Been Gone". The album was failed to achieve the success as her debut album, "Keshia Chanté", which was certified Gold by the CRIA. After the release of the third single, Fallen, Chanté refused to finish promoting her album to its full potential because of "dirty label politics" infuriating her to ask to be released from her record label. After a few months, her wish was granted and she was released from Sony BMG Canada.

In 2007, after her departure from Sony BMG Canada, Chanté took a brief absence from the spotlight, wanting to learn more about the music business and being mentored by respected entertainment lawyers in Hollywood and Toronto. She later made the decision to move to Atlanta and West Hollywood, where she worked closely the camps of Ne-Yo, Missy Elliott and OutKast. She began honing her skill as a songwriter and her acting chops, starring as the lead actress in the TV series "Soul".

In September 2010, Chanté announced that she would release a 2 disc album titled "Night & Day" slated for a release in Spring 2011. One disc, titled 'Night' will be all Dance music and the other disc, titled 'Day' will be R&B, reminiscent of Chanté's first two albums. When looking for inspiration and the direction that she wanted for this album, she stated that wanted something with "no-genre", sing something that was real and to the heart. Keshia found inspiration from Brandy's Afrodisiac.

== Recording and music ==
In an interview with Sway Magazine, Keshia stated “I was travelling all over New York, Miami and L.A., working with different writers and producers,” she says. “At one point, I had 100 songs, but it still didn’t feel like it was happening for me. This is the third album and I had more substantial things to say. So I came back to Toronto, assembled some musicians and a couple of writers and just let it flow.” Keshia also stated that she had been in the studio with Ne-Yo and his camp of writers, as well as The Outsyders, who produced Britney Spears' "Womanizer", but feel she didn't find her own sound by working with them.

In 2009, a song leaked by the title 'I Hope You Cry'. The song generated hype, as it was rumored to be from the Aaliyah biopic, which was obviously false. The song was produced by Atlanta-based producer, J-New. Singer Tiffany Evans recorded the song as well, but the first recording was done by Chante, which was confirmed by her in 2011. In 2010, when asked if the song will make the album via Ustream, she answered "Yes", although plans may have changed. In 2010, another track entitled 'Dead To Me' was leaked. The track was written by JC Smith, Keshia Chante and Roz Bell. Smith described the song before it leaked, stating "…think Madonna’s ‘Frozen’ mixed with OneRepublic/Timbaland ‘Apologize’. Of course, those are just reference points...this song is definitely it's [sic?] own thing...as it should be.".

Chante began working with Canadian producers VicPark after experimenting in US with many other producers. Chante stated "I got into the studio with Vic Park and had a great time! We have crazy musical chemistry & I was able to find "my" sound. For the rest of the album, I did just that. Working with musicians and creating what I wanted as opposed to adding to music that already exists. The entire album process has been very organic." VicPark has credits on tracks such as "If U Say" and "Test Drive".

In 2010, during a Ustream session with the fans, Chante previewed and early version of "Table Dancer" and VicPark produced track, "Hang My Jersey Up". "Hang My Jersey Up" was named as the first single from the album, but was later switched for "Table Dancer". During a later session, she previewed "If U Say".

In September 2010, The singles for the album were confirmed as "Table Dancer" from the Night side of the album, and "Test Drive" from the single from the Day side of the album. "Test Drive" would later only be used for viral promotion.

== Promotion ==
She promoted the album all around across Canada.

In August 2012, Chanté signed a 3 album record deal in Japan, releasing her album Night & Day there in November of the same year. In November, Table Dancer landed on Japan's billboard chart; #6 on Hot 100, #3 on Digital & Airplay & #11 on regular chart. On the week of November 28, 2012, Chante's first single release "Table Dancer" became her first song ever to chart outside of Canada making her debut at #1 on the Billboard Charts in Japan.

== Singles ==
"Test Drive" was released as a promo single on October 12, 2010. On August 13, 2010, Chante shot the music video for the song. The song received minimal airplay and failed to chart on the Hot 100 or iTunes.

"Table Dancer" was released as the official first single. It officially impacted US radio on October 5, 2010. It peaked at number 44 in Canada, becoming Keshia's first song to do so. The video for the single was released November 25, 2010 via VEVO and the video climbed into the Top 5 on the MuchMusic Countdown.

Then it was announced that "Set U Free" featuring writing credits from Taio Cruz would serve as the album's second single. It entered the Canadian Hits Chart (Airplay) at #81 and climbed into the Canadian Top 40 (Airplay) within two weeks after charting. The song debuted on the Canadian Hot 100 at #92 and peaking at #84.

"Shooting Star" was confirmed to be the third single from the album. Keshia confirmed she was set to perform the track on MuchMusic on June 24, 2011.

"Edit, Cut, & Delete U" was as Chante's fourth single confirmed by a post on the Universal Music Canada website on Monday October 17, 2011.

"I Miss U" was the last released single off the album.

== Track listing ==
Songwriting credits and producers per album liner notes. Standard edition is housed in a jewel case and contains 14 tracks.

No.	Title	Writer(s)	Producer(s)	Length
1.	"Hotline"	Keshia Chanté; Angelo "Levi" Themelkos; Craig McConnell	Craig McConnell	3:43
2.	"Table Dancer"	Chanté; Jay Botalla; Adam Alexander; Alex Vujic	Alex Greggs	3:12
3.	"Set U Free"	Taio Cruz; Alex James; Mathias Wollo	Justin Forsley	4:29
4.	"Edit, Cut & Delete U"	Chanté; Candy Gloster; Mark Cyrus; Rupert Gayle	Justin Forsley	3:13
5.	"Victorious"	Chanté; Gloster	Mark Cyrus	3:35
6.	"I Hope U Cry"	Cotrell "Chase J" Qualls; Micah Clarke; Jamie Newman	J-New	3:59
7.	"Shooting Star"	Andrew Grange; Gloster	Rob Wells	3:40
8.	"Hang My Jersey Up" (featuring P. Reign)	Chanté; Themelkos	Mike Kiofos; Raynord Humphrey	4:23
9.	"Pillow Talk"	Chanté; Themelkos	Mike Kiofos; Tommy Lee Brown	5:27
10.	"I Miss U"	Chanté; Themelkos; Dan Talevski; Murray Daigle	Anthony M Jones	3:13
11.	"Hush"	McConnell; Chad Richardson; Johnny Wright; Ben Earle	Craig McConnell; Chad Richardson	3:32
12.	"Test Drive"	Chanté; Themelkos	Mike Kiofos	4:07
13.	"If U Say"	Chanté	Mike Kiofos	4:08
14.	"Ghost Love"	Chanté; Gloster; Cyrus; Hardbottle	Rob Wells	3:33
Total length:				54:09

Japan Edition Bonus Track of "Night & Day"
No.	Title	Writer(s)	Producer(s)	Length
15.	"I've Been Searchin'"	Chanté; Themelkos	Ryo Sukeimai; Murray Daigle	4:41

- Tracks 1 - 7 = Night Side
- Tracks 8 - 14 = Day Side

* Note: Track 15 is a Japan bonus track.
