= Unbound 01 =

EP by Keshia Chanté
- Released: March 24, 2017
- Label: Independent

Keshia Chanté chronology
Night & Day (2011)	Unbound 01 (2017)	Unbound 02 (2018)

Unbound 01 is the debut extended play (EP) by Canadian singer Keshia Chanté. It was released on March 24, 2017, independently.

The EP has garnered positive reviews upon its release from Apple Music, Noisey and AUX.

== Background ==
Chante was quoted by VICE saying the following about "RedLight", "Pain can lead people into different directions in life and different places at night" and paints "a picture into [her] world of escapism." Chante was quoted by Aux.tv about "Harmless", “What is perceived as harmless, generally is what hurts us the most. Like, ‘have another shot, it’s no big deal!’ or ‘He’s a good guy, what’s the worst that can happen?’ But ultimately, too much of anything can be harmful."

== Critical reception ==
Ebro Darden from Beats 1 Apple Music cited "Bryson Tiller" a song as an ode to Bryson Tiller as a gritty R&B song.

AUX said Unbound 01 ignites Chante's signature sound. When speaking of "Harmless", "The slow-burning piano chords, pounding percussion and sweeping atmospherics of “Harmless” hearken back to the crowning moments of late-1990s/early-2000s R&B, but the lurking synth bass and Chanté's soaring vocals lend the track a distinctly modern edge: think Teairra Marí in a zero-gravity chamber."

VICE 's NOISEY reviewed the EP calling it "considerably matured and more decidedly self-aware R&B". In particular, "RedLight"s maturity was compared to Beyonce, citing its new found maturity, saying "Chanté on "Redlight" sounds like someone who is very aware of the uncomfortable realities that emerge when you're in your 20s and beyond; weaving through the unpredictabilities and emotions that come with it. To that end, her sound and the mood she creates on the track is much darker. "Redlight" is the sonic equivalent of a cool, still night: beautiful but there is something eerie in its midst, hidden in the dark."
