= Shawn Desman (album) =

Studio album by Shawn Desman
- Released: October 30, 2002
- Recorded: 2001–2002
- Genre: Pop; R&B
- Length: 48:10
- Label: Sony BMG Music Entertainment
- Producer: Shawn Desman, Vince "Vinny Mac" Maria, Kuya Productions, Perry Alexander, Hugo Lira, Thomas Gustafsson, Ricciano Lumpkins, Ricci Nitoni, Chris Perry, Camara Alford

Shawn Desman chronology
Shawn Desman (2002)	Back for More (2005)

Singles from Shawn Desman
- 1. "Get Ready" Released: 2002; 2. "Shook" Released: 2002; 3. "Spread My Wings" Released: 2003

Shawn Desman is the self-titled debut studio album by Canadian singer Shawn Desman. The album debuted at number 38 in Canada and spawned three singles: "Get Ready", "Shook" and "Spread My Wings". It was also certified gold by Music Canada for selling over 50,000 units in that country.

== Track listing ==
No.	Title	Writer(s)	Producer(s)	Length
1.	"Intro"		Shawn Desman	1:08
2.	"Bow"	Jud Mahoney, Thomas Gustafsson, Hugo Lira, S. Desman	T. Gustafsson, H. Lira	3:14
3.	"Never Change Me"	T. Gustafsson, H. Lira	T. Gustafsson, H. Lira	3:21
4.	"Pocketbook (Interlude)"			0:15
5.	"Yoyo"	Camara Alford, S. Desman, T. Gustafsson, H. Lira	T. Gustafsson, H. Lira, S. Desman*	3:45
6.	"Shook"	C. Alford, S. Desman, Robert Gerongco, Samuel Gerongco	Kuya Productions, S. Desman	3:32
7.	"Back Up (Interlude)"		Perry Alexander, C. Alford, S. Desman	0:54
8.	"Get Ready"	Johann Camat, S. Desman, R. Gerongco, S. Gerongco	Kuya Productions	3:36
9.	"Spread My Wings"	Gary White, R. Lumpkins, Szhachilea Chunn	Ricciano Lumpkins	3:57
10.	"Couldn't Care Less"	Franciz & LePont	S. Desman, P. Alexander
11.	"Bubble Bath (Interlude)"		S. Desman, P. Alexander, C. Alford	0:41
12.	"Better Than Me"	N. Notini, Savan Kotecha, S. Desman	Nicci Notini	3:53
13.	"Baby Stay"	T. Gustafsson, H. Lira, Robert Zuddas	T. Gustafsson, H. Lira	3:41
14.	"Just About You"	S. Desman, N. Notini	S. Desman	3:51
15.	"Superman"	S. Desman, Adam Alexander, Chris Perry, Rupert Gayle	S. Desman, P. Alexander	4:31
16.	"Difference"	S. Desman, C. Perry, A. Alexander	S. Desman, P. Alexander	4:28

- (*) Denotes co-producer.

== Charts ==
Chart (2002)	Peak position
Canadian Albums Chart	38

== Certifications ==
Region	Certification	Certified units/sales
Canada (Music Canada)	Platinum	100,000^{‡}
^{‡} Sales+streaming figures based on certification alone.
