= Fresh (Shawn Desman album) =

Studio album by Shawn Desman
- Released: August 3, 2010
- Recorded: 2009–2010
- Genre: Dance-pop; R&B
- Length: 38:20
- Label: UOMO, Universal Music Canada
- Producer: Shawn Desman, Christopher Stewart, Leeyou & Danceey, Scott Storch, The Clutch, Stargate, Random

Shawn Desman chronology
Back for More (2005)	Fresh (2010)	Alive (2013)

Singles from Fresh
- 1. "Shiver" Released: February 23, 2010; 2. "Electric / Night Like This" Released: June 15, 2010; 3. "Moneyshot / Something Stupid" Released: 2011

Fresh is the third studio album by Canadian singer Shawn Desman that contains 11 songs. It was first released in Canada on August 3, 2010. The album was preceded by its Top 20-peaking lead single "Shiver" and the Platinum-certified dual singles "Electric" and "Night Like This".

== Track listing ==
1. "Fresh"
2. "Electric"
3. "Moneyshot"
4. "Quickie"
5. "Click"
6. "Trouble"
7. "Shiver"
8. "Night Like This"
9. "Impossible"
10. "Something Stupid"
11. "Dynamite"

== Chart performance ==
=== Album ===
Chart (2010)	Peak position
Canadian Albums (Billboard)	29

=== Singles ===
Year	Single	Peak chart positions	Certification
Year	Single	CAN	Certification
2010	"Shiver"	18	MC: Gold
2010	"Night Like This"	22	MC: Platinum
2010	"Electric"	23	MC: Platinum
2011	"Moneyshot"	—	
2011	"Something Stupid"	—	
"—" denotes a recording that did not chart.
