= Shiver (Shawn Desman song) =

Single by Shawn Desman

from the album Fresh
- Released: February 23, 2010
- Recorded: 2010
- Genre: Pop
- Length: 3:23
- Label: Sony BMG; UOMO
- Songwriters: Shawn Desman; Negin Djafari; Thomas Gustafsson; Hugo Lira; Ian-Paolo Lira
- Producers: Harry "Slick" Sommerdahl; Shawn Desman

Shawn Desman singles chronology
| "Man in Me" (2005) | "Shiver" (2010) | "Night Like This" (2010) |

Music video
- "Shiver" on YouTube

"Shiver" is a song recorded by Canadian recording artist Shawn Desman for his third studio album, Fresh (2010). It was released to digital retailers through the UOMO label on February 23, 2010 as the lead single from Fresh, and reached a peak position of number 18 on the Canadian Hot 100 for the week of May 15, 2010. "Shiver" is Desman's first single to be released in five years, since "Man in Me" in 2005.

To further promote the single, other versions of the single were released digitally: "Shiver (Dance Remix)" was released on May 18, 2010, "Shiver (UOMO Remix)" was released on May 25, 2010, and an EP containing two French adaptations of "Shiver", entitled "Shiver (French Mixes)", was released on June 1, 2010.

== Music video ==
The music video for "Shiver" was directed by RT! and shows Desman singing to his love interest while a group of black-clad male and female dancers perform an interpretive dance around him. It premiered on Vevo and iTunes on April 23, 2010. The video was covered by Dom Taino, who also covered "Oh Sherrie" by Steve Perry.

== Charts ==
| Chart (2010) | Peak position |
|---|---|
| Canada Hot 100 (Billboard) | 18 |
| Canada AC (Billboard) | 33 |
| Canada CHR/Top 40 (Billboard) | 16 |
| Canada Hot AC (Billboard) | 18 |

== Certifications and sales ==
| Region | Certification | Certified units/sales |
|---|---|---|
| Canada (Music Canada) | Gold | 40,000^{*} |
^{*} Sales figures based on certification alone.
