= Table Dancer =

Single by Keshia Chanté

from the album Night & Day
- B-side: "Test Drive"
- Released: October 12, 2010
- Recorded: 2010
- Genre: Electropop; dance-pop; R&B
- Length: 3:11
- Label: Tanjola; Universal Music Canada; Interscope; KCi
- Songwriters: Keshia Chanté; Adam Alexander; Jay Botalla; Alex Vujic; Josh Cohen; Alex Greggs
- Producer: Alex Greggs

Keshia Chanté singles chronology
"Fallen" (2007)	"Table Dancer" (2010)	"Set U Free" (2011)

Music video
- "Table Dancer" on YouTube VEVO (KeshiaChanté Channel)

"Table Dancer" is a song by Canadian recording artist Keshia Chanté from her third album Night & Day. "Table Dancer" was co-written by Keshia Chanté and produced by Alex Greggs. The song was released October 5, 2010 via Chanté's official website and later released on October 12 via iTunes Canada. "Table Dancer" features a dance pop production and lyrics that were inspired by women letting loose and table dancing for fun.

== Music video ==
An accompanying music video for the song was directed by RT!. It premiered November 24, 2010 via Vevo. The music video features Chanté as table dancer, along with others, entertaining an audience who are also dancing to the tunes. In the video, Chanté experiments with different looks, such as wearing a blonde wig. The choreography was by Luther Brown, who is known for his work on So You Think You Can Dance Canada. She endorses Pepsi in the music video.

== Chart performance ==
"Table Dancer" debuted at No. 78 on the Canadian Hot 100 and peaked at No. 44. The song is her first to debut on the chart since the chart's debut in June 2007. The song remained on the chart for 16 weeks. The music video reached the Top 10 on the MuchMusic Countdown. The song accumulated a radio audience of well over 5,000,000. It peaked at #22 on Mediabase's Top 40 Mainstream chart and is Chanté's greatest selling single to date. The song made the top 10 on Japan's Hot 100 chart, peaking at #9, making it Chanté's first single to chart outside of Canada. It also reached the top spot of Japan's Digital and Overseas Airplay chart.

=== Charts ===
Chart (2010–12)	Peak position
Canadian Hot 100	44
Japan (Japan Hot 100)	9
Japan Digital and Overseas Airplay (Billboard)	1
