= Set U Free (Keshia Chanté song) =

Single by Keshia Chanté

from the album Night & Day
- B-side: "If U Say"
- Released: March 1, 2011
- Recorded: 2010
- Genre: Pop/R&B
- Length: 4:47
- Label: Universal Music Canada
- Songwriters: Taio Cruz, M. Wallo, A. James
- Producer: Justin Forsley

Keshia Chanté singles chronology
"Table Dancer" (2010)	"Set U Free" (2011)

"Set U Free" is a song by Canadian recording artist Keshia Chanté. It was released as the first single from her third studio album, Night & Day. "Set U Free" was written by Taio Cruz, while being produced by Justin Forsley. After a demo version of the song performed by Taio Cruz was leaked, the finished version premiered on February 17, 2011, via Chante's official YouTube account. "Set U Free" features an 80's pop/R&B production which Chante describes as Janet Jackson inspired and lyrics that depict someone being teased by their muse while trying to seduce them.

== Background ==
"Set U Free" was written by Taio Cruz, M. Wallo and Alex James, while being produced by Justin Forsley. The song was first released on Swedish singer Danny Saucedo's album Set Your Body Free in 2008. Taio Cruz's version of the song leaked, under the title 'Set Your Body Free', February 16, 2011 followed by the releases of Chanté's the next day.

== Chart performance ==
The single unexpectedly was released digitally via iTunes on March 1, 2011. The song quickly jumped into the Top 200 Songs chart, already proving to become more successful than her previous single Table Dancer. The song was filed under Pop, whereas the Table Dancer single could be found under R&B/Soul. It entered the Canadian Hits Chart (Airplay) at #81 and climbed into the Canadian Top 40 (Airplay) within 2 weeks after charting. The song debuted on the Canadian Hot 100 at #92 and peaking at #84.

On February 17, 2011, the single became available for streaming on Keshia Chanté's official YouTube account. Before the release, Chanté tweeted "Good Morning tweethearts! Getting ready to hit the studio & finish another song for the album! New single "Set U Free" premieres today!! :)". She praised the track prior its release, describing it as a 'smash' and a dance track. Three days prior to the track's release, Chanté showcased the official cover art of the single via her Twitter.

== Charts ==
Chart (2011)	Peak position
Canadian Hot 100	84
