= Back for More (Shawn Desman album) =

Studio album by Shawn Desman
- Released: May 3, 2005
- Recorded: 2003–2004
- Genre: Crunk; hip hop
- Label: UOMO, Sony BMG Music Entertainment
- Producer: Shawn Desman & Christopher "Tricky" Stewart (exec.); Perry Alexander, Lil Jon, Rodney "Darkchild" Jerkins, Philipp Laney Stewart, Tha Cornaboyz, Thomas Gustafsson

Shawn Desman chronology
Shawn Desman (2002)	Back for More (2005)	Fresh (2010)

Back for More is the second studio album by Canadian singer Shawn Desman.

== Track listing ==
#	Song title	Producer(s)	Time
01	"Back for More"	Christopher "Tricky" Stewart	4:07
02	"Let's Go"	Shawn Desman & Perry Alexander	3:57
03	"Sexy"	Rodney "Darkchild" Jerkins	3:54
04	"Ooh"	Jonathan Smith	3:03
05	"Insomniac"	Tha Cornaboyz	4:16
06	"Hurt"	Christopher "Tricky" Stewart	3:20
07	"Red Hair"	Christopher "Tricky" Stewart	3:57
08	"She Ain't Coming Back"	Christopher "Tricky" Stewart	3:58
09	"Nobody"	Thomas Gustafsson	3:52
10	"What If"	Thomas Gustafsson	3:47
11	"Man In Me"	Christopher "Tricky" Stewart	3:16
12	"That's Love"	Christopher "Tricky" Stewart	4:00
13	"Butterflies"	Shawn Desman & Perry Alexander	4:53

== Singles ==
- "Sexy" (2003) B-Side "My Mind"
- "Let's Go" (2005)
- "Red Hair" (2005)
- "Man In Me"(2005)

== Certifications ==
Region	Certification	Certified units/sales
Canada (Music Canada)	Gold	50,000^{‡}
^{‡} Sales+streaming figures based on certification alone.
