= Joseph Gomes =

Joseph Gomes is a Canadian Citizen, immigrated from the country of Trinidad and Tobago.

Awards

Year	Award	Production	Sponsor	References
2003	Best Director - Musical	Evita	ACT-CO 2002-2003 Theatre Festival	Georgetown Globe Productions
2000	Best Director - Musical	West Side Story	ACT-CO Theatre Festival	Georgetown Globe Productions
1993	Arts Person of the Year		City of Brampton Arts	Arts Person of the Year
1990	Elaine Shimzu Award		Brampton Music Theatre	Elaine Shimizu Award

Theatrical History

Year	Production	Role	Company	Reviews
2009	Wizard of Oz	Director	Georgetown Globe Musical Productions Youth Company	Georgetown Independent & Free Press Review
2008	Sweeney Todd	"Signor Pirelli"		
	The King and I	"Lun Tha"		
	Anything Goes	"Bobby"		
1990	Jesus Christ Superstar	"Judas"	Brampton Musical Society	
1989	The Music Man	Director	Brampton Musical Society	
1985	Oliver!	"Mr. Bumble"	Brampton Musical Society	
1985	Cabaret	"MC"	Brampton Musical Society	
1982	The King and I	"The King"	Brampton Musical Society	
