= 2U (album) =

2006 album by Keshia Chanté

Studio album by Keshia Chanté
- Released: 5 December 2006
- Recorded: 2005–06
- Genre: R&B
- Labels: Epic; Sony Urban; Sony Canada
- Producers: Keshia Chanté (executive); Matrax; The Co-Stars; Danja; Rockwilder; Happy Perez; Tyrice Jones; Carvin & Ivan; The Narcotics; Adam Alexander; Rupert Gayle

Keshia Chanté chronology
Keshia Chanté (2004)	2U (2006)	Night & Day (2010)

2U is the second album by singer-songwriter Keshia Chanté, released by BMG in Canada in December 2006 and Japan. The album is two-time Juno Award nominated. Sony Urban/Epic Records released both "Summer Love" and "Been Gone" in the U.S. The video for the first single "Been Gone" was directed by Director X. Her second "2U" was shot in Miami in 2006. Her third single "Fallen" was released as two versions, respectively featuring Drake and Freeway.

Chanté was nominated for the 2007 Juno Award for R&B/Soul Recording of the Year for the single "Been Gone", and the 2008 Juno Award for R&B/Soul Recording of the Year for the single "2U".

== Track listing ==
2U — Standard edition
No.	Title	Writer(s)	Producer(s)	Length
1.	"Been Gone"	Frankie Storm; Keshia Chanté; Ashley Lewis; Shawn Johnson; Roy Warren	Matrax	3:36
2.	"Kiss"	Kristal Oliver; Ivan Barias; Calvin Haggins	Carvin & Ivan	4:02
3.	"Fallen"	Leslie Pridgen; Nastacia "Nazz" Kendall	Tyrice Jones	3:42
4.	"Beep Beep"	Janet Sewell; Andre Knight; Ian Heyward; Kijana Elcock	The Narcotics	2:44
5.	"2U"	Storm; Chanté; Lincoln Gilmore; Kae Williams Jr.	Matrax	3:19
6.	"Summer Love"	Storm; Balewa Muhammad; Cynthia Lissette; Patrick J. Que Smith; Vito Colapietro; Neely Dinkins Jr.	The Clutch; The Co-Stars	3:26
7.	"Be About Yours"	Yummy Bingham; Chanté; Rupert Gayle	Rockwilder	3:01
8.	"Little Things"	Adam Alexander; Chris Perry; Jermaine Scott	Adam Alexander; Rupert Gayle	3:27
9.	"Can't Believe"	Yummy Bingham	Rockwilder	2:13
10.	"Stomp"	Arama Brown; Muhammad; Smith; Colapietro; Dinkins Jr.	The Clutch; The Co-Stars	6:37
11.	"Too Much"	Candice Nelson; Ezekiel Lewis; Keri Hilson; Smith; Floyd Natheniel Hills	Danja	4:03
12.	"Sorry"	Storm; Chanté	Matrax	3:46
13.	"Cool on You"	Muhammad; Nelson; E. Lewis; Derek Bramble; Nathan Perez; Thabiso Nkhereanye	Happy Perez	3:42
14.	"Ring the Alarm" (Keshia Chanté Remix)	Oliver; Chanté; Clive Bright; Meesah Kuteyi; Rupert Gayle; Winston Riley	Matrax	3:13

Credits

- Mixed by Jean-Marie Horvat
- Mastered by Tom Coyne
- A&R – Anton Marchand
- Vocal Production: The Clutch (Tracks: 6, 10, 11, 13) in The HitFactory Miami, Mischke (Tracks: 1–5, 7, 9, 12, 14)

Notes

- "Been Gone" contains portions of Concerto No. 4 in F minor, Op. 8/4 "Winter" (Four Seasons) – Allegro non-molto
- "2U" contains a sample from the recording "Free Yourself" written by Kae Williams Jr. as recorded by Breakwater
- "Cool On You" contains replayed elements from the composition "Still in Love" written by Derek Bramble
- "Ring The Alarm (Keshia Chanté Remix)" contains replayed elements from the composition "Ring The Alarm" written by Winston Riley and Clive Bright

== Singles ==
- "Ring the Alarm"
- "Been Gone"
- "2U"
- "Fallen" featuring Freeway
- "Fallen" featuring Drake (remix)
