= Brampton Arts Council =

Coordinates: 43.689536°N 79.762974°W

The Brampton Arts Council was a charitable, multi-arts umbrella organization dedicated to the promotion and development of the arts in the city of Brampton in Ontario, Canada. It represented numerous artists and arts groups, the Brampton Arts Council encourages and recognizes excellence in the arts across the community. To fulfill its mandate, the Brampton Arts Council carries out activities in the following categories:

- education and development
- networking opportunities
- communications
- promotion and advocacy

The BAC annually recognizes a Brampton resident for their contribution to the arts.

== Arts Person of the Year ==
Brampton Arts Council Arts Person of the Year is a prize to honour the Brampton resident who exemplifies continued patronage to any sector of the arts: visual, dance, dramatic or musical.

=== Past winners ===
- 2014 - Mike Butterworth
- 2013 - Chuck Scott
- 2012 - Jade Jager Clark
- 2011 - David Rehner
- 2010 - Kelly McNeil
- 2009 - Glenn McFarlane
- 2008 - Dale O'Hara
- 2007 - Lynden Cowan
- 2006 - Maureen Adams
- 2005 - Alan & Sylvia Gibson
- 2004 - John Cutruzzola
- 2003 - Paulette Murphy
- 2002 - Marion Fralick-Bartlett
- 2001 - David & Catherine Harmsworth
- 2000 - Rhoda Begley
- 1999 - Conrad Mieschke
- 1998 - Peter Richards
- 1997 - Alan Heatley & John Setterfield
- 1996 - Jan Stapleton
- 1995 - Gail & Ken Watson
- 1994 - Andrew Dittgen
- 1993 - Joseph Gomes
- 1992 - Keith Moreau
- 1991 - Moira Lumley
- 1990 - L. Greta Capps
- 1989 - Jack Reid
