= Keshia Chanté (album) =

Studio album by Keshia Chanté
- Released: June 22, 2004
- Genres: R&B; soul; hip hop soul
- Length: 53:39
- Labels: ViK. Recordings; BMG Music Canada; UOMO Music Inc.
- Producers: Perry Alexander, Young Gavin, Kuya, Lonnie Szoke

Keshia Chanté chronology
Keshia Chanté (2004)	2U (2006)

Keshia Chanté is a self-titled debut studio album by Canadian singer Keshia Chanté, released by BMG Music Canada on June 22, 2004, and was certified gold. The album received positive reviews from critics and industry insiders, winning numerous awards, including a Juno Award for R&B/Soul Recording of the Year, making Chanté the youngest winner. The album garnered numerous awards and accolades.

== Singles ==
The album features the singles "Shook", "Unpredictable", "Bad Boy", "Does He Love Me?" ft. Foxy Brown and "Let The Music Take You". The album was certified gold.

Her debut single "Shook (The Answer)" was released in early 2003, when Chanté was only 14 years old. It won an Urban Music Award for Best Pop/R&B Single. The follow-up, "Unpredictable" went No. 3 on both radio & video charts;^{[9]} she released her first video, which hit No. 1 on YTV and the top ten on MuchMusic. In November 2003, the CD single of "Unpredictable" was certified gold. Because of that single, in 2003, she won the Canadian Radio Music Award for Best New Solo Artist. In early February 2004, Chanté's third single, "Bad Boy", was released. It was also successful, breaking the Top 10 on radio and sitting at No. 3 on MuchMusic for four weeks before later earning the No. 1 position on the chart. The video was directed by Director X.^{[10]} Later, in June 2004, Chanté topped the charts again (Top 5) with the release of her fourth single "Does He Love Me?" ft. Foxy Brown, which Chanté & Foxy Brown wrote and Young Gav (Foxy Brown's older brother) produced. The video was also directed by Director X and became No. 1 on MuchMusic for three weeks. The video also garnered her an Urban Music Video Award for Video of the Year. On June 22, 2004 Chanté released her self-titled debut album. On December 3, 2004, it was certified gold. It contained her previous singles, as well as her later to be released fifth single "Let the Music Take You", also penned by Chanté. In October 2004, at the Canadian Urban Music Awards Chanté swept all three of her nominations, winning awards for Best New Artist, Video of the Year (for "Bad Boy"), Fans' Choice Award and taking home the Rising Star of the Year award.^{[8]} In that same month, she also sang the national anthem at the Canadian Football League's Grey Cup championship game.^{[11]}

In December 2004, Chanté headlined a concert at Nathan Phillips Square in Toronto for New Year's Eve.^{[12]} In February 2005, Chanté won Chartattack Awards for Best Album and Sexiest Female. During the same month, she was also selected to represent Canada at Expo 2005 held in Japan. In July 2005, Chanté went on a cross-Canada mall and venue tour sponsored by Solo Mobile (Bell), EckoRed and SPC sponsored Chanté's tour across Canada which helped raise awareness for the phone counseling service Kids Help Phone. In September 2005, Chanté performed on tour with Destiny's Child throughout Canada during their Destiny Fulfilled... and Lovin' It tour, and is also included on their Live in Atlanta tour DVD. In October 2005, Chanté received four nominations at the Urban Music Awards.^{[13]}

== Critical reception ==
Professional ratings
Review scores
Source	Rating
Allmusic	3.5/5 stars

Tara Henley of The Georgia Straight noted that "Beneath the slickly produced, hip-hop--tinged, pop veneer of tracks like "Shook (The Answer)" lies an arresting voice, magnetic charisma, and driving ambition."

=== "Unpredictable" ===
"Unpredictable" features an interpolated melody from "A Dream" by DeBarge. Denise Sheppard from Amazon said "Unpredictable" was "a sugar-pop track that definitely appealed to her younger audience.'"

== Charts and certifications ==
"Unpredictable" went No. 1 on both radio & video charts, including MuchMusic & YTV's Hitlist.

"Bad Boy" and "Does He Love Me" went No. 1 on the MuchMusic video charts.

All five singles were Top 10 at radio.

"Does He Love Me" and "Bad Boy" won the SOCAN No.1 Award.

== Track listing ==
Keshia Chanté — Standard edition
No.	Title	Writer(s)	Producer(s)	Length
1.	"Intro"	Adam Alexander; Keshia Chanté; Chris Perry; Jermaine Scott	Perry Alexander	0:41
2.	"Does He Love Me" (featuring Foxy Brown)	Gavin Marchand; Chanté; Rupert Gayle; Meesah Kuteyi; Inga Marchand	Young Gavin; Ty Fife^{[a]}	3:39
3.	"Spinnin'"	A. Alexander; Shawn Desman; Gayle; Perry	Shawn Desman; P. Alexander	3:50
4.	"Unpredictable"	A. Alexander; Desman; Gayle; Perry; Etterlene Jordan	P. Alexander; Desman; Gayle^{[a]}	3:35
5.	"Bad Boy Interlude"	A. Alexander; Desman; Gayle; Perry	P. Alexander	1:20
6.	"Bad Boy"	A. Alexander; Perry; Gayle; Desman	P. Alexander; Gayle^{[a]}	3:44
7.	"Singles Night"	Mark Sheehan; Daniel O'Donoghue; Alex Greggs; Paul Brown	Alex G; Mark Sheehan; Daniel O'Donogue	3:53
8.	"Let the Music Take You"	Gayle; Lonnie Szoke; Chanté	Lonnie Szoke; Kenny Krush	3:59
9.	"Slackin' Producers Interlude"	Chanté; Perry	P. Alexander	0:27
10.	"Shook (The Answer)"	Desman; Camara Alford; Robert Gerongco; Samuel Greongco; Albert Johnson; Kejuan Muchita	P. Alexander; Alford	4:12
11.	"Tonight"	A. Alexander; Desman; Gayle; Perry	P. Alexander; Desman; Gayle	4:04
12.	"Together"	Samuel Gerongco; Robert Gerongco; Gayle; Chanté	Kuya	4:03
13.	"True Colours"	A. Alexander; Gayle; Perry	P. Alexander; Gayle	3:51
14.	"Little Things"	A. Alexander; Gayle; Perry	Alexander; Gayle	3:23
15.	"Come Fly with Me" (includes 16 seconds of silence at the end)	A. Alexander; Gayle; Perry	P. Alexander; Gayle	4:24
16.	"Bad Boy (Reggae Remix)" (featuring Shakari Nyte and Jelleestone)	A. Alexander; Perry; Gayle; Desman		4:41
Total length:				53:39

Sample credits

- "Unpredictable" contains an element of "A Dream" (1983) performed and written by Bunny DeBarge.
- "Shook (The Answer)" contains a sample from "Shook Ones (Part II)" (1995) performed by Mobb Deep, written by Prodigy and Havoc.

== Awards ==
Won

- Canadian Radio Award for Best New Solo Artist
- Urban Music Association of Canada Award for Best R&B Artist.
- Urban Music Award for Best New Artist
- Urban Music Award for Video of the Year for "Bad Boy"
- Urban Music Award for Fans Choice Award

== Singles ==
- "Shook (The Answer)" (2003)
- "Unpredictable" (2003)
- "Bad Boy" (2004)
- "Does He Love Me" (2004)
- "Let The Music Take U" (2005)

== Weekly charts ==
Chart (2004)	Peak position
Canadian Albums (Nielsen SoundScan)	12
Canadian R&B Albums (Nielsen SoundScan)	6

== Certifications ==
Certifications and sales for "Keshia Chanté"
Region	Certification	Certified units/sales
Canada (Music Canada)	Gold	50,000^{^}
^{^} Shipments figures based on certification alone.
