= Let's Go (Shawn Desman song) =

Single by Shawn Desman

from the album Back for More
- Released: 2005
- Recorded: 2005
- Genre: Dance-pop
- Length: 3:43
- Label: Sony BMG Music Entertainment
- Songwriter(s): Tebey, Vince Clarke, Chris Perry, Shawn Desman, Adam Alexander
- Producer(s): Shawn Desman, Perry Alexander

Shawn Desman singles chronology
"Sexy" (2003)	"Let's Go" (2005)	"Red Hair" (2005)

"Let's Go" is a song by Canadian singer Shawn Desman. It was released in 2005 as the second single from his album Back for More. The song heavily features a synthesizer phrase sampled from the 1982 hit "Don't Go" by British new wave duo Yazoo.

The song peaked at number 6 on the Canadian Singles Chart, another top 10 hit for Desman. The song's music video also gained heavy airplay on VH1.

== Music video ==
The music video features Desman dancing with back-up dancers in a room. The song also features some segments featuring Desman with a mixing board.

== Track listing ==
1. "Let's Go" (Original Mix) - 3:59
2. "Let's Go" (Uomo 98 Remix) - 3:53
3. "Let's Go" (Uomo 108 Remix) - 6:00
4. "Let's Go" (video)

== Chart performance ==
Chart (2005)	Peak position
Canada CHR/Pop Top 30 (Radio & Records)	3
Germany (GfK)	27
