= Been Gone =

Single by Keshia Chanté

from the album 2U
- Released: July 2006
- Recorded: 2005
- Genre: R&B, pop
- Length: 3:39
- Label: Sony Urban Music; Epic Records
- Songwriters: Keshia Chante, Frankie Storm, Ashley Lewis, Shawn Johnson, Roy Warren

Keshia Chanté singles chronology
"'Ring the Alarm'" (2005)	"Been Gone" (2006)	"'2U'" (2006)

"Been Gone" is the second single from Canadian R&B singer Keshia Chanté's second studio album 2U.The single was produced by Philadelphia-based production company The Matrax. The song features a sped-up section of Antonio Vivaldi's "Winter" which plays throughout most of the song. It peaked at 10 on the Canadian BDS Radio Airplay chart.

== Music video ==
The music video premiered on MuchMusic at 5:00pm (EST) on September 14, 2006 and is directed by Little X. The video was filmed at a high school in Ontario.
