= Jack Reid (artist) =

Canadian artist (died 2009)

- Born: Jack Reid; Toronto, Ontario, Canada
- Died: August 24, 2009 (aged 83–84); Orillia, Ontario, Canada
- Known for: Watercolourist

Jack Reid (died 2009) was a Canadian watercolour artist.

Born in Toronto, Reid was self-taught, beginning as a graphic artist until becoming a full-time painter in 1970. He taught workshops and demonstrations and toured worldwide began in 1971, teaching over 11,000 students by the 1990s.

Reid enjoyed a successful career over six decades, with some paintings entering Her Majesty Queen Elizabeth II's personal collection at Windsor Castle. In 1992, he was awarded the Commemorative Medal by the Canadian government for his contribution to Canadian art and was honoured Arts Person of the Year in his hometown of Brampton. He exhibited in London, England with the Royal Institute of Painters in Watercolours. He was a lifetime member of The Arts and Letters Club of Toronto, Visual Arts Brampton, and the Canadian Society of Painters in Water Colour.

He authored two books, Watercolour Basics: Let's Get Started and Painting Snow and Water. He produced an instructional CD-ROM and did a mini-series of painting demos, broadcast on Rogers Cable. In 2001, Jack was featured in the popular American magazine Watercolor Magic.

After 33 years of marriage, Reid's wife Maggie died in late 2002. Jack Reid died on August 24, 2009, in Orillia, Ontario, at the age of 84. Jack also was mourned by his companion Pat whom he shared 6 years of joy with.

In 2014, a star on Brampton's Walk of Fame was dedicated to Reid, and was received by nephew Robert McAffee, on his uncle's behalf.

== Workshops ==
Jack taught thousands of people through workshops in:

- New Brunswick: Steeves Mountain (2006)
- Ontario: Brampton (19??-current), Erieau (2006), Haliburton (2006), Mississauga (2000), Sarnia (2001)
- Saskatchewan: Saskatoon (2005, 2006)
- Alberta: Calgary (2006), Cochrane (2005)
- British Columbia: Agassis (2005), Comox (2005), Kamloops (2005), Qualicum (2006), Victoria & Tofino (2005), Whistler (2007)
- Scotland
- Ireland: Adare (2005), Dingle Peninsula (2005), Dublin (2005), Killarney (2005)
