= Shawn Desman =

Canadian singer and songwriter (born 1982)

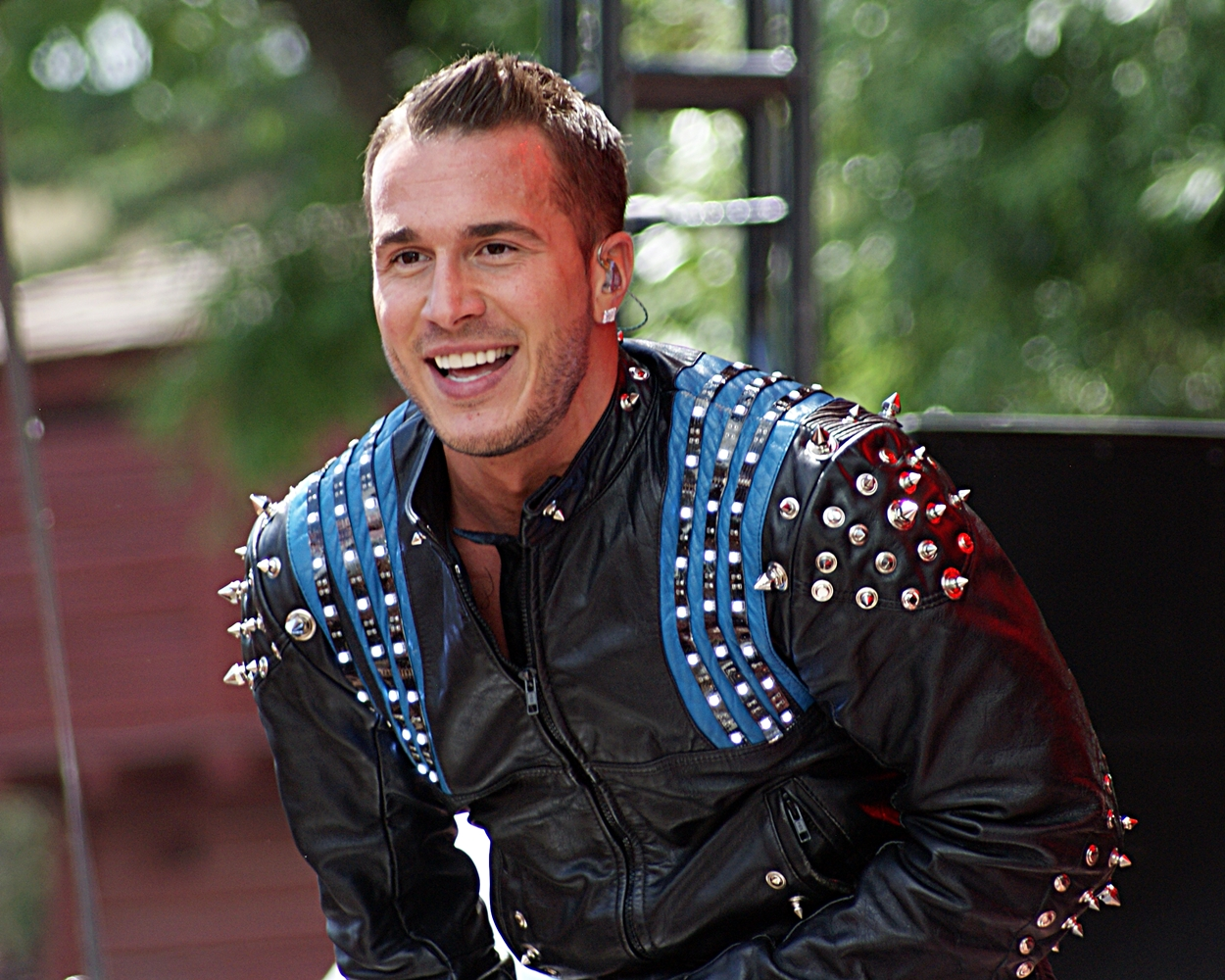
- Desman performing in 2011

Background information
- Born: Shawn Fernandes; January 12, 1982 (age 44); Mississauga, Ontario, Canada
- Occupations: Singer; songwriter; record producer; dancer; choreographer; actor
- Years active: 1991–present
- Website: shawndesman.com
- Musical career
- Genres: R&B; hip hop; dance; edm; electronica
- Instruments: Vocals
- Labels: Wax Records, Universal Music Canada, BMG Music Canada

Shawn Bosco Fernandes (born January 12, 1982), known by his stage name Shawn Desman, is a Canadian singer, songwriter, dancer, actor, and choreographer.

== Early life ==
Desman attended St. Francis of Assisi Elementary School in Toronto. After discovering his passion for performing, Desman's parents encouraged him to pursue a career in music. From age nine to 16, he made Portuguese albums and toured under his legal name, Shawn Fernandes. In 1998, Shawn was in The Boomtang Boys video for their song "Squeeze Toy" as a dancer.

== Career ==
=== 2002–2005: Debut album and Back for More ===
At 18, Desman was signed to BMG Music Canada and started recording an album, which was released in 2002. The self-titled breakthrough album featured three top ten singles ("Shook", "Spread My Wings" and "Get Ready") on the Canadian charts. The album went on to achieve gold certification in Canada. The single, "Spread My Wings", is a cover of the unreleased group Vega, featuring Chilli of TLC.

His follow-up album, Back for More garnered a Juno Award for the R&B/Soul Recording of the Year which featured the single "Let's Go". After the release of his second album, BMG dropped him from the label. He was then signed to Universal Music Canada.

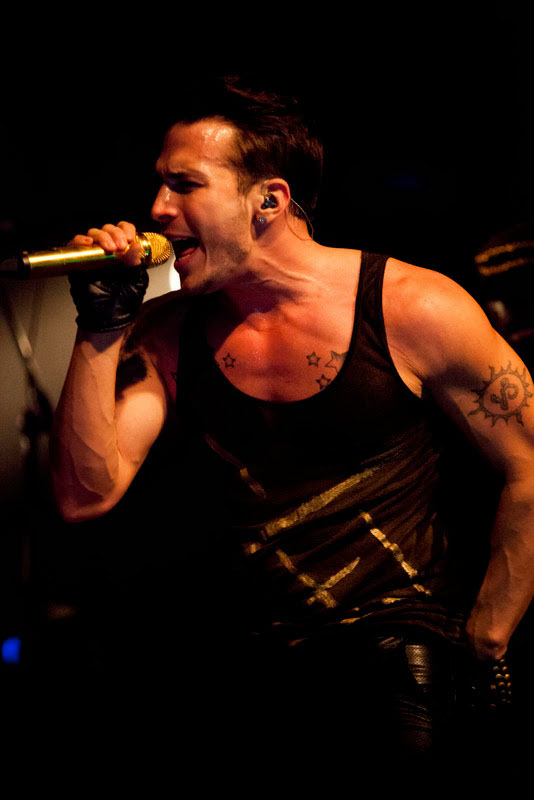
Desman performing at the Mod Club in Toronto, November 2013

=== 2010–2015: Fresh and Alive ===
His 2010 album Fresh garnered two gold singles, one platinum single, Video of the Year at the Much Music Video Awards, Canadian Dance/Pop Song of the year at the Stylus Awards, as well as SOCAN Number 1 Award for Electric/Night Like This.

Desman is also a producer and has worked with various artists producing hit singles for Nick Carter, Kreesha Turner, Keshia Chanté as well as contestants on YTV's The Next Star, where he produced the song "One More First Chance" for Brock Zanrosso in 2009 and "It Might Be You" for contestant Parker Schmidt in 2011.

In 2013, Desman released his fourth studio album, Alive, along with an accompanying short film of the same name. The album spawned two singles; "Nobody Does It Like You" and "Dum Da Dum". In 2015, he released the songs "Victoria" and "Obsession", and was dropped by Universal Music.

=== 2022–present: Resurgence ===
In July 2022, Desman performed at Drake's All Canadian North Stars concert at OVO Fest, featuring a dozen Canadian hip-hop and R&B artists. After the show, Drake approached him in the hallway outside of the green room, praising him for his performance and had encouraged him to continue making music. A few months later he had signed a new deal with Wax Records and released a new single called "Maniac", his first single since 2015's "Obsession". In January 2023, the single debuted at number 99 on the Canadian Hot 100, making it his first appearance on the chart in 10 years, it would then peak at number 71.

In 2023, he participated in an all-star recording of Serena Ryder's single "What I Wouldn't Do", which was released as a charity single to benefit Kids Help Phone's Feel Out Loud campaign for youth mental health. In November 2025, Desman collaborated with Canadian country singer Dallas Smith on the song "One Good Life".

== Personal life ==
Desman is of Portuguese and Italian descent. He has two younger brothers (one of them being fellow Canadian singer Danny Fernandes). He is also a cousin to another Canadian singer Tyler Medeiros.

In 2015, Desman's wife became ill, so he made the difficult decision to step away from his music career to focus on his family. He credits his appearance at Drake's 2022 OVO Fest concert celebrating a legacy of Canadian hip-hop and R&B musicians as one reason why he returned to making solo music. A conversation with Drake and response from the audience gave him the conviction to return to the recording studio.

== Accolades ==
- Eponymous was certified Gold by the Canadian Recording Industry Association.
- In 2006, won a Juno Award for "R&B/Soul Recording of the Year".
- In 2011, won "Video of the year" at the Much Music Video Awards for his video "Electric/Night Like This".
- In 2011, won Canadian Dance/Pop Single of the Year at the Stylus Awards.
- In 2011, won SOCAN No. 1 Award for Electric/Night Like This reaching No. 1.
- In 2013, Alive won Best Outstanding Short Film at Reel World Film Festival

== Discography ==
=== Studio albums ===
List of albums, with selected chart positions and certifications
Title	Album details	Peak	Certifications
Title	Album details	CAN	Certifications
Shawn Desman	Released: October 30, 2002; Label: UOMO, Sony BMG; Format: CD	38	MC: Platinum
Back for More	Released: May 3, 2005; Label: UOMO, Sony BMG; Format: CD, digital download	14	MC: Gold
Fresh	Released: August 3, 2010; Label: UOMO, Universal Canada; Format: CD, digital download	29	
Alive	Released: February 5, 2013; Label: UOMO, Universal Canada; Format: CD, digital download	—	
"—" denotes releases that did not chart.

=== Live albums ===
Title	Album details
Shawn Desman: Live from the Phoenix, Toronto	Released: June 14, 2024; Label: Wax; Format: CD, digital download, streaming

=== Singles ===
Year	Title	Peak chart positions						Certifications	Album
Year	Title	CAN	CAN AC	CAN CHR	CAN HAC	AUS	GER	Certifications	Album
1995	"Tu és Minha"	—	—	—	—	—	—		Portuguese albums
1999	"Don't Want to Lose You"	19	—	—	—	—	—		Portuguese albums
2002	"Get Ready"	1	—	—	—	37	—		Shawn Desman
2002	"Shook"	3	—	—	—	—	64	MC: Gold	Shawn Desman
2003	"Spread My Wings"	—	—	—	—	—	—		Shawn Desman
2003	"Sexy"	—	—	—	—	—	—		Back For More
2005	"Let's Go"	—	—	3	—	—	27		Back For More
2005	"Red Hair"	—	—	9	—	—	—		Back For More
2005	"Man in Me"	—	—	16	—	—	—		Back For More
2010	"Shiver"	18	33	16	18	—	—	MC: Gold	Fresh
2010	"Night Like This"	22	9	9	13	—	—	MC: Platinum	Fresh
2010	"Electric"	23	—	11	15	—	—	MC: Platinum	Fresh
2011	"Moneyshot" / "Something Stupid" (Note: "Moneyshot" and "Something Stupid" were released as a dual-single in 2011.)	—	—	—	—	—	—		Fresh
2012	"Nobody Does It Like You"	18	12	23	12	—	—	MC: Gold	Alive
2012	"Dum Da Dum"	32	14	14	21	—	—		Alive
2013	"Too Young to Care"	—	—	—	—	—	—		Alive
2013	"Stuck"	—	—	—	—	—	—		Alive
2015	"Victoria"	—	—	31	48	—	—		Non-album singles
2015	"Obsession"	—	—	24	—	—	—		Non-album singles
2022	"Maniac"	71	—	48	—	—	—		Non-album singles
2023	"Love Me with the Lights On"	—	—	—	—	—	—		Non-album singles
2024	"Beautiful Day"	—	—	—	—	—	—		Non-album singles
2024	"Heels on the Ground"	—	—	—	—	—	—		Non-album singles
2024	"Never Fall in Love Again"	—	—	—	—	—	—		Non-album singles
2025	"Body" (with Jamie Fine)	85	20	10	5	—	—		Non-album singles
2025	"Miami" (with Fito Blanko and Aiona Santana)	—	—	—	—	—	—		Non-album singles
2025	"One Good Life" (with Dallas Smith)	—	—	—	—	—	—		Non-album singles
"—" denotes releases that did not chart or were not released to that territory or format.

=== Features ===
- 2003: "Movie Star (Remix)" Rascalz feat. Shawn Desman
- 2006: "All Eyes on Me" Puppet feat. Shawn Desman
- 2010: "Feel It" Danny Fernandes feat. Shawn Desman

=== Collaborations ===
- 2009: "One More First Chance" (as producer for Brock Zanrosso on YTV's The Next Star)

== Filmography ==
- Get Over It (2001)
- Honey (2003)
- How She Move (2007)
- The Next Step (2015)
