= Urban Music Association of Canada =

Canadian non-profit focusing on music

The Urban Music Association of Canada (UMAC) is a Canadian non-profit organization focused on showcasing and expanding Canadian urban music established in 1996. UMAC offers a variety of service such as workshops, tours and also hosts the Canadian Urban Music Awards. Its president is Trevor Shelton.

== History ==
UMAC was established in 1996 to promote urban music in Canada. It has chosen an Artist of the Year every year since its establishment, a distinction that has been described as "prestigious" by MTV.

=== Canadian Urban Music Awards ===
The UMAC created its annual Canadian Urban Music Awards in 1998 "to garner more attention for the country's growing urban-music scene." In 2004, the awards covered 24 categories including soca, gospel, jazz and spoken word. The awards have also been known as Urban X-posure awards.

== See also ==
- Canadian hip hop
- Music of Canada
