= Keshia Chanté =

Canadian actress and musician (born 1988)

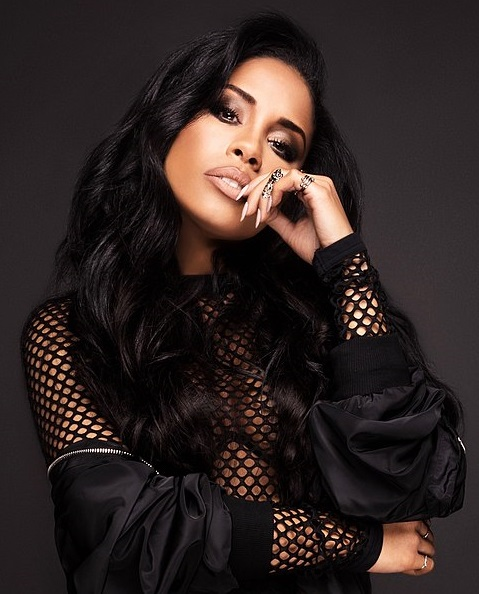
- Chanté in 2016

Background information
- Born: Keshia Chanté Harper; June 16, 1988 (age 38); Ottawa, Ontario, Canada
- Origin: Toronto, Ontario, Canada
- Genres: R&B; pop; hip hop; soul
- Occupations: Singer-songwriter; actress; television personality; businesswoman
- Years active: 2002–present
- Labels: Sony Music Canada; Universal Music Canada; Sony Urban Music
- Website: keshiachante.com

Keshia Chanté Harper (born June 16, 1988) is a Canadian singer-songwriter, television host, actress and entrepreneur.

She has served as a judge on the international music competition series The World's Best, hosted The Legacy Awards, been an on-air reporter and host for Entertainment Tonight Canada, and is listed as an International Voter for the Golden Globe Awards.

Chanté has appeared on, or hosted, several television programs including the BET Awards, Paramount's Peak of the Week, hosted BB Rewind, the official after show of season 22 of Big Brother on CBS, and Battle of the Blades. She has also participated in community and charitable initiatives, including hosting We Day and supporting campaigns focused on mental health awareness. In 2022, she founded the hair care brand KHAIR.

In 2014, she received a star on the Brampton Arts Walk of Fame for her contributions to Canadian entertainment.

== Early life ==
Keshia Chanté Harper was born and raised in Ottawa, Ontario, and spent summers with her grandparents in Hinesville, Georgia. Her father is of Afro-Trinidadian descent and her mother is of Portuguese descent.

She moved to the Greater Toronto Area as a teenager and graduated from Fletcher's Meadow Secondary School in 2006.

== Career ==
=== 2003–2012 ===
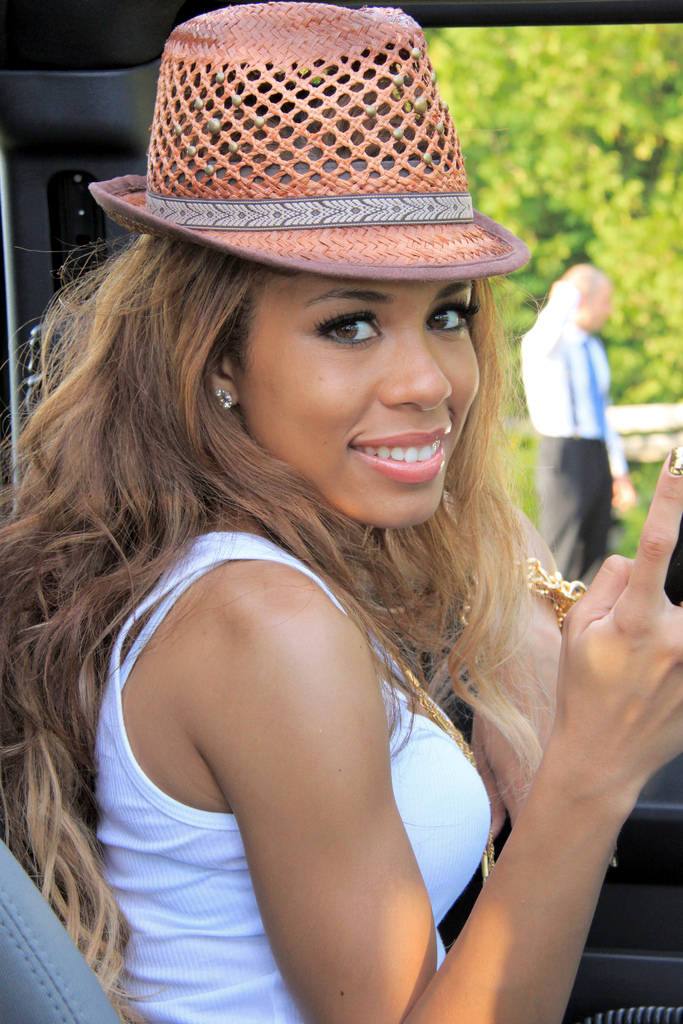
Keshia Chanté (2010)

In 2003, Chanté released the singles "Shook (The Answer)," and "Unpredictable", in response to Shawn Desman's "Shook". The video for her single "Bad Boy" was directed by Director X.

Her self‑titled debut album was released in 2004. In October 2004, at the Canadian Urban Music Awards, Chanté won Best New Artist, Video of the Year (for "Bad Boy"), and the Fan's Choice Award. That month she also performed the national anthem at the CFL's Grey Cup championship game.

Her second album, 2U, was released by Sony Music Canada in 2006, in Canada and Japan. That same year, her MTV special "The Diary of Keshia Chanté" aired in December.

Her third album, Night & Day, was released in 2011 by Universal Music Canada. Singles "Test Drive" and "Table Dancer" received Juno Award nominations (R&B/Soul Recording of the Year and Dance Recording of the Year, respectively). She performed on ET Canada's New Year's Eve show in Niagara Falls. In late 2012, "Table Dancer" reached the Billboard Japan charts, including Hot 100 and Digital & Airplay.

=== 2013–2015 ===
Chanté co‑hosted 106 & Park on BET alongside Bow Wow during 2013–2014, and appeared as an on‑air correspondent at BET events. In December 2014, she received a star on the Brampton Arts Walk of Fame.

=== 2016–2022 ===
BET premiered Chanté's song "The Valley" in November 2016. In March 2017, Noisey premiered "Red Light" and A.Side (AUX) premiered "Harmless", followed by the release of the EP Unbound 01 (2017) and Unbound 02 (2018). Unbound 01 received a Juno nomination in 2018.

In 2020, Chanté hosted Battle of the Blades with Ron MacLean on CBC Television. She also hosted BB Rewind, the official after show of season 22 of Big Brother.

=== 2023–present ===
In 2022, Chanté launched the hair care brand KHAIR. In April 2023, she was listed as an International Voter for the Golden Globe Awards. In April 2025, she appeared in the Lifetime film Fame: A Temptations Story alongside Keri Hilson.

In June 2025, Chanté participated in the 25th‑anniversary 106 & Park tribute segment at the BET Awards in Los Angeles.

== Musical style ==
Tara Henley of The Georgia Straight wrote that Chanté has "an arresting voice, magnetic charisma, and driving ambition." Denise Sheppard of Amazon.ca described Chanté as "a teen‑targeted pop phenom" whose "music has the one‑two punch of melodic hooks and the voice to back them up; a combination that can and will appeal to dance/pop music fans of any age."

=== Influences ===
Chanté has cited Beyoncé, Aaliyah, and Brandy among her childhood influences, as well as Tupac Shakur, with whom she shares a birthday.

== Public image ==
In Canada, Chanté has been described as a fashionista by national outlets, performing at Marchesa's first Toronto runway show and appearing at a Chanel event during the Toronto International Film Festival. She later served as a judge on Canada's Best Beauty Talent alongside Coco Rocha and Flare editor‑in‑chief Lisa Tant.

=== Endorsements ===
Chanté has endorsed brands such as CANON, Pepsi, Bacardi, Nestlé, Bell, Rogers, Stila Cosmetics, MAC Cosmetics, Ecko Red and Sony. In 2007, Chanté served as the face of Ontario Tourism and sang the theme song in their commercials. In November 2010, Chanté became the face of the Pepsi Refresh Project campaign.

== Personal life ==
Chanté began dating former National Hockey League goaltender Ray Emery in June 2010, who had starred as the love interest in her music video for "Test Drive", and the two became engaged in June 2016. But in 2017, Chanté announced via her Instagram account that she had called off the wedding.. She later sought a restraining order against Emery, who was arrested for allegedly uttering threats and assaulting her with a weapon.

Chanté divides her time between West Hollywood, California, and Toronto, Ontario.

== Philanthropy ==
Chanté has supported HIV/AIDS awareness and youth initiatives in Canada and abroad.

She has worked with World Vision in the Dominican Republic. She also participated in an AIDS awareness fundraiser with Alicia Keys in support of the Stephen Lewis Foundation.

In 2014, Chanté appeared in an NBC public service announcement for Mariska Hargitay's Joyful Heart Foundation alongside Eli Manning and Hilary Swank to raise awareness of domestic violence. She has hosted We Day events in Calgary and Ottawa and spoken about mental health awareness, including depression and anxiety.

== Discography ==
Studio albums

- Keshia Chanté (2004)
- 2U (2006)
- Night & Day (2011)
- Unbound 02 (2018)

EPs

- Unbound 01 (2017)

== Filmography ==
Year	Title	Role	Notes
2007	da Kink in My Hair	Dahlia	Episode: "Empty Bag Can't Stand Up"; 1 epiode
2009	Soul	Mahalia Brown	Lead role; 6 episodes
2011	Top Chef Canada	Judge	2 episodes
2012	Match Game	Guest star	5 episodes
2012	Sunshine Sketches of a Little Town	Vocalist	TV film
2012–2013	The Next Star	Judge	2 seasons; 24 episodes
2013–2015	106 & Park	Host	390 episodes
2014	BET Awards Pre-Show	Host	
2014	BET Awards	Presenter	
2014	BET Hip Hop Awards	Presenter	
2014	Bethenny	Herself	3 episodes
2014	106 & Park: New Year's Eve	Host	
2014	BET: Notarized	Host	TV special; Best 100 Videos of 2014
2015	Hockey Wives	Herself	5 episodes
2015	BET Awards Pre-Show	Host	
2015	106 & Party: New Year's Eve	Host	TV special
2015	BET: Notarized	Host	TV special; Best 100 Videos of 2015
2016	106 & Party: New Year's Eve	Host	TV special
2016	Chopped Canada	Guest star	1 episode
2018–present	ET Canada	Host	Hollywood correspondent; 300+ episodes
2019	The World's Best	International music judge	Season 1; 10 episodes
2020–present	Big Brother aftershow "BB Rewind"	Host	14 episodes
2021–2022	Peak of the Week (Paramount+)	Host	2 seasons; 20 episodes
2020–2021	Jann	Recurring guest star	
2020	Private Eyes	Recurring guest star	
2025	Fame: A Temptations Story	Roxy	Lifetime film

== Awards and nominations ==
=== 2003 ===
- Canadian Urban Music Award for Best R&B/Soul Single for "Shook (The Answer)" – Won
- Canadian Radio Music Award for "Best New Solo Artist" (Dance/Urban/Rhythmic) – Won
- Canadian Radio Music Award for "Best New Solo Artist" (CHR) – Won

=== 2004 ===
- Canadian Urban Music Award for Best New Artist – Won
- Canadian Urban Music Award for Video of the Year for "Bad Boy" – Won
- Canadian Urban Music Award for Fans’ Choice – Won
- Rising Star Award for Rising Star of the Year – Won
- MuchMusic Video Award for "Best R&B Video" for "Does He Love Me?" – Won

=== 2005 ===
- Juno Award for "R&B/Soul Recording of the Year" – Won
- Juno Award for "New Artist of the Year" – Nominee
- Canadian Urban Music Award for "Video of the Year" for "Does He Love Me?" – Won
- MuchMusic Video Award for "People's Choice: Favourite Canadian Artist" – Won
- MuchMusic Video Award for "Best Pop Video" for "Does He Love Me?" – Won

=== 2007 ===
- Juno Award for "R&B/Soul Recording of the Year" for "Been Gone" – Nominee

=== 2008 ===
- Juno Award for "R&B/Soul Recording of the Year" for "2U" – Nominee

=== 2011 ===
- Juno Award for "Dance Recording of the Year" for "Table Dancer" – Nominee
- Juno Award for "R&B/Soul Recording of the Year" for "Test Drive" – Nominee

=== 2018 ===
- Juno Award for "R&B/Soul Recording of the Year" for Unbound 01 (EP) – Nominee

=== 2022 ===
- Canadian Screen Award — Best Entertainment News Program or Series for ET Canada – Winner

=== 2023 ===
- Canadian Screen Award — Best Host, Web Program or Series for ET Canada Live – Winner

=== 2024 ===
- Canadian Screen Award — Best Host, Live Entertainment Special for The Legacy Awards – Nominee
- Canadian Screen Award — Best Host, Entertainment News Program for Entertainment Tonight Canada – Nominee

== See also ==
- List of Afro-Latinos
