= List of number-one singles in Canada =

Canadian singles charts were compiled by CHUM radio from 1957 to 1964, RPM from 1964 to 2000, and The Record from 1983 to 1996. Nielsen SoundScan compiled charts from 1996 to the present; Billboard's Canadian Hot 100, compiled from Nielsen SoundScan and Nielsen Broadcast Data Systems, has been published on a weekly basis since 2007.

== Preface ==
The following year-by-year, week-by-week lists are based on chart data by CHUM-AM (1957–1964), RPM (1964–2000), Nielsen SoundScan (2000–2007), and Billboard (2007–present).

For the CHUM Chart, chart positions are based on song requests from listeners and orders from record stores. Originally containing 50 positions, the number of chart positions was reduced to 30 until the chart's demise in 1986.

The RPM charts, at the magazine's inception, initially contained republished charts of major-market top-40 stations across Canada until July 1964, when it began compiling its own top singles charts based on retail sales reports by record stores and playlist submissions by radio stations across Canada. From September 1988 until its final publication in November 2000, the RPM top singles chart became an airplay-only chart; physical record sales were tracked in a separate retail chart from that time.

For the Nielsen Canadian Singles Chart, data is collected at point of sale of record stores participating in the SoundScan program since 1996. The Canadian Singles Chart is published weekly in Jam! Canoe magazine and Billboard (until 2006). In 2006, Nielsen created the Canada Digital Songs chart, tracking digital downloads from online retailers such as the iTunes Store; this chart replaced the previous Canadian Singles Chart published on Billboard in 2006.

For the Billboard Canadian Hot 100, chart data is compiled from cumulative airplay points, digital downloads, online streaming and physical single sales, tracked by Nielsen (present Luminate). The Canadian Hot 100 is released every Sunday of each week.

== Charts ==
=== CHUM Chart (1957–1964) ===
- 1957
- 1958
- 1959
- 1960
- 1961
- 1962
- 1963
- 1964

=== RPM (1964–2000) ===
==== Adult contemporary charts ====
- 1969
- 1970
- 1971
- 1972
- 1973
- 1974
- 1975
- 1976
- 1977
- 1978
- 1979
- 1980
- 1981
- 1982
- 1983
- 1984
- 1985
- 1986
- 1987
- 1988
- 1989
- 1990
- 1991
- 1992
- 1993
- 1994
- 1995
- 1996
- 1997
- 1998
- 1999
- 2000

==== Alternative rock charts ====
- 1995
- 1996
- 1997
- 1998
- 1999
- 2000

==== Country music charts ====
- 1964
- 1965
- 1966
- 1967
- 1968
- 1969
- 1970
- 1971
- 1972
- 1973
- 1974
- 1975
- 1976
- 1977
- 1978
- 1979
- 1980
- 1981
- 1982
- 1983
- 1984
- 1985
- 1986
- 1987
- 1988
- 1989
- 1990
- 1991
- 1992
- 1993
- 1994
- 1995
- 1996
- 1997
- 1998
- 1999
- 2000

==== Dance charts ====
- 1976
- 1977
- 1978
- 1979
- 1988
- 1989
- 1990
- 1991
- 1992
- 1993
- 1994
- 1995
- 1996
- 1997
- 1998
- 1999
- 2000

==== Top singles charts ====
- 1964
- 1965
- 1966
- 1967
- 1968
- 1969
- 1970
- 1971
- 1972
- 1973
- 1974
- 1975
- 1976
- 1977
- 1978
- 1979
- 1980
- 1981
- 1982
- 1983
- 1984
- 1985
- 1986
- 1987
- 1988
- 1989
- 1990
- 1991
- 1992
- 1993
- 1994
- 1995
- 1996
- 1997
- 1998
- 1999
- 2000

=== Billboard (2000–present) ===
==== Canada Country Airplay ====
- 2006
- 2007
- 2008
- 2009
- 2010
- 2011
- 2012
- 2013
- 2014
- 2015
- 2016
- 2017
- 2018
- 2019
- 2020
- 2021
- 2022
- 2023
- 2024

==== Canadian Singles Chart ====
- 2000
- 2001
- 2002
- 2003
- 2004
- 2005
- 2006
- 2007

==== Canadian Hot 100 ====
- 2007
- 2008
- 2009
- 2010
- 2011
- 2012
- 2013
- 2014
- 2015
- 2016
- 2017
- 2018
- 2019
- 2020
- 2021
- 2022
- 2023
- 2024
- 2025
- 2026

== See also ==
- The Top 100 Canadian Albums
- List of best-selling singles in Canada
- Canadian music charts
