= List of number-one albums of 1998 (Canada) =

These are the Canadian number-one albums of 1998. The charts were compiled and published by RPM every Monday.

Issue date	Album	Artist
January 5	Big Shiny Tunes 2	Various Artists
January 12	Big Shiny Tunes 2	Various Artists
January 19	Big Shiny Tunes 2	Various Artists
January 26	Big Shiny Tunes 2	Various Artists
February 2	Titanic: Music from the Motion Picture	James Horner
February 9	Titanic: Music from the Motion Picture	James Horner
February 16	Titanic: Music from the Motion Picture	James Horner
February 23	Titanic: Music from the Motion Picture	James Horner
March 2	Titanic: Music from the Motion Picture	James Horner
March 9	Titanic: Music from the Motion Picture	James Horner
March 16	Ray of Light	Madonna
March 23	Ray of Light	Madonna
March 30	Titanic: Music from the Motion Picture	James Horner
April 6	Titanic: Music from the Motion Picture	James Horner
April 13	Titanic: Music from the Motion Picture	James Horner
April 20	Titanic: Music from the Motion Picture	James Horner
April 27	Titanic: Music from the Motion Picture	James Horner
May 4	Hit Zone 4	Various Artists
May 11	Hit Zone 4	Various Artists
May 18	Hit Zone 4	Various Artists
May 25	Now! 3	Various Artists
June 1	Now! 3	Various Artists
June 8	Now! 3	Various Artists
June 15	Now! 3	Various Artists
June 22	Now! 3	Various Artists
June 29	Now! 3	Various Artists
July 6	Now! 3	Various Artists
July 13	Now! 3	Various Artists
July 20	Now! 3	Various Artists
July 27	Now! 3	Various Artists
August 3	Phantom Power	The Tragically Hip
August 10	Phantom Power	The Tragically Hip
August 17	Armageddon: The Album	Soundtrack
August 24	Armageddon: The Album	Soundtrack
August 31	Armageddon: The Album	Soundtrack
September 7	Follow the Leader	Korn
September 14	Armageddon: The Album	Soundtrack
September 21	Armageddon: The Album	Soundtrack
September 28	S'il Suffisait d'Aimer	Céline Dion
October 5	Mechanical Animals	Marilyn Manson
October 12	Mechanical Animals	Marilyn Manson
October 19	Dizzy Up the Girl	the Goo Goo Dolls
October 26	Dizzy Up the Girl	the Goo Goo Dolls
November 2	The Miseducation of Lauryn Hill	Lauryn Hill
November 9	Supposed Former Infatuation Junkie	Alanis Morissette
November 16	The Best of 1980-1990	U2
November 23	Supposed Former Infatuation Junkie	Alanis Morissette
November 30	Double Live	Garth Brooks
December 7	These Are Special Times	Céline Dion
December 14	Big Shiny Tunes 3	Various Artists
December 21	Big Shiny Tunes 3	Various Artists
December 28	Big Shiny Tunes 3	Various Artists

== See also ==
- List of Canadian number-one singles of 1998

== Sources ==
https://www.worldradiohistory.com/Archive-All-Music/RPM.htm
