= List of Canadian Hot 100 number-one singles of 2009 =

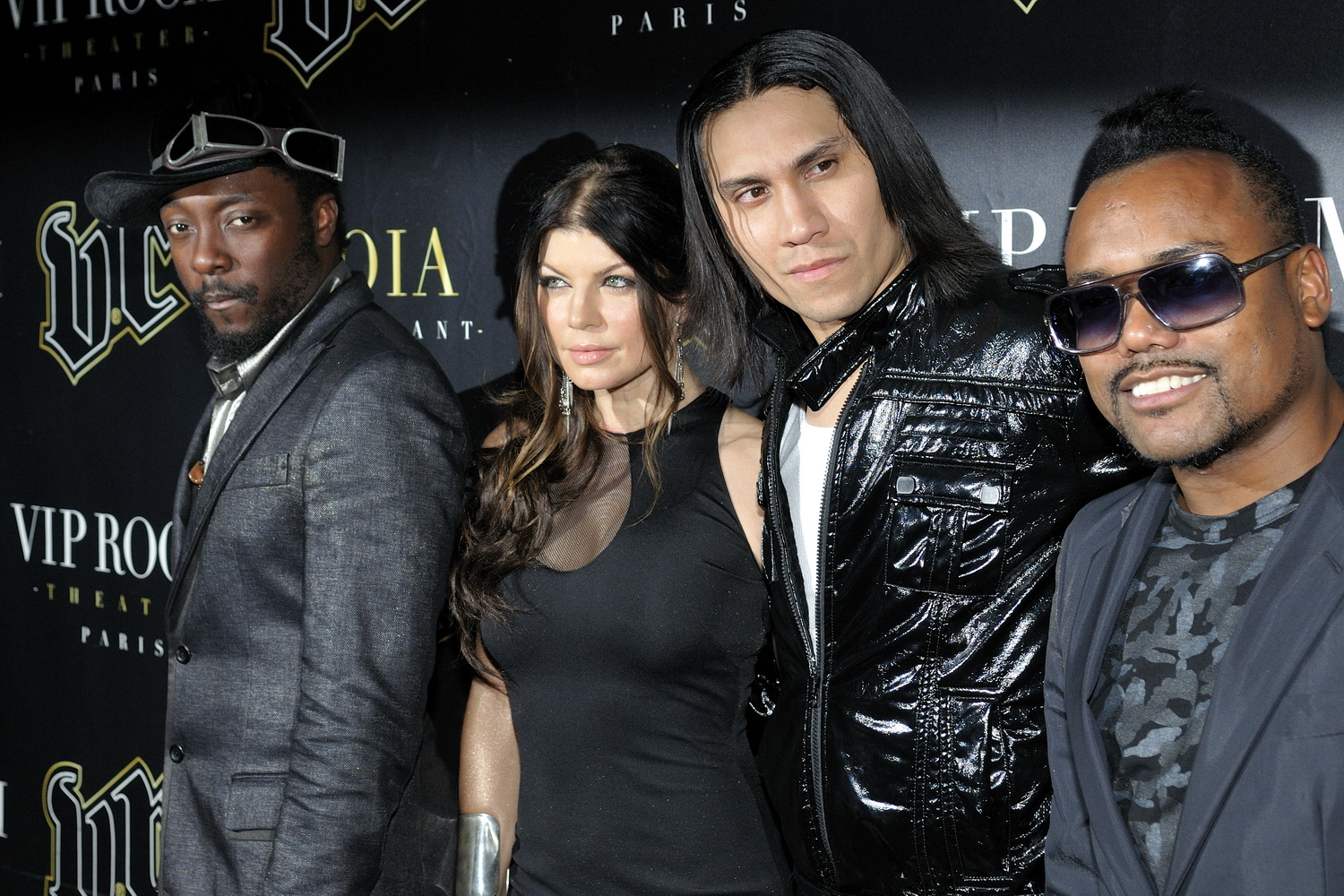
The Black Eyed Peas (pictured) topped the chart for 25 non-consecutive weeks with their singles "Boom Boom Pow" and "I Gotta Feeling", with the latter becoming the longest-running number-one single of the year.

The Canadian Hot 100 is a chart that ranks the best-performing singles of Canada. Published by Billboard magazine, its data are similar to Billboard's U.S.-based Hot 100 in that it compiles Nielsen SoundScan based collectively on each single's weekly physical and digital sales, as well as airplay. Canada's airplay chart is compiled with information collected from monitoring more than 100 stations that represent rock, country, adult contemporary and contemporary hit radio genres. The online version of the chart features the Canadian flag next to tracks that qualify as Canadian content.

In 2009, eight acts achieved their first Canadian Hot 100 number-one single either as a lead artist or a featured guest: Kelly Clarkson, Eminem, 50 Cent, Dr. Dre, the Black Eyed Peas, David Guetta, Akon and Kesha. The Black Eyed Peas and Lady Gaga were the only acts to earn two number-one singles in 2009, with the former topping the chart for 25 non-consecutive weeks with their singles "Boom Boom Pow" and "I Gotta Feeling".

In 2009, 9 singles topped the chart. Although 10 singles claimed the top spot in the 52 issues of the magazine, Lady Gaga's "Poker Face" began its peak position in late 2008, and is thus excluded. The Black Eyed Peas' "I Gotta Feeling" topped the Canadian Hot 100 for sixteen consecutive weeks, becoming the longest-running chart-topping single of 2009. Flo Rida's "Right Round" and the Black Eyed Peas' "Boom Boom Pow" tied for the second longest-running number-one single of the year, both with nine non-consecutive weeks. Britney Spears's "3" is noted for its jump from eighty six to first place on the Canadian Hot 100, the largest first place leap since the chart's establishment.

== Chart history ==
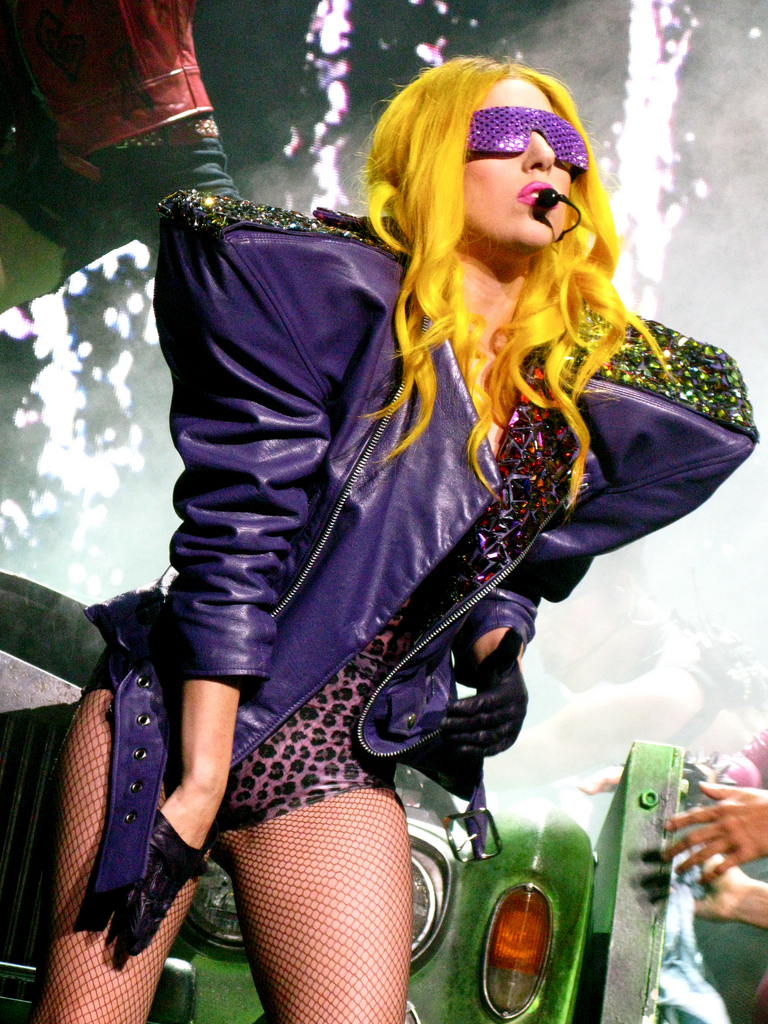
Lady Gaga (pictured) topped the chart for eight consecutive weeks from December 13, 2008 – January 31 with her single, "Poker Face". It returned to number one on February 14, making it as a number-one single for 9 non-consecutive weeks. "Bad Romance" also became number-one for 5 non-consecutive weeks.

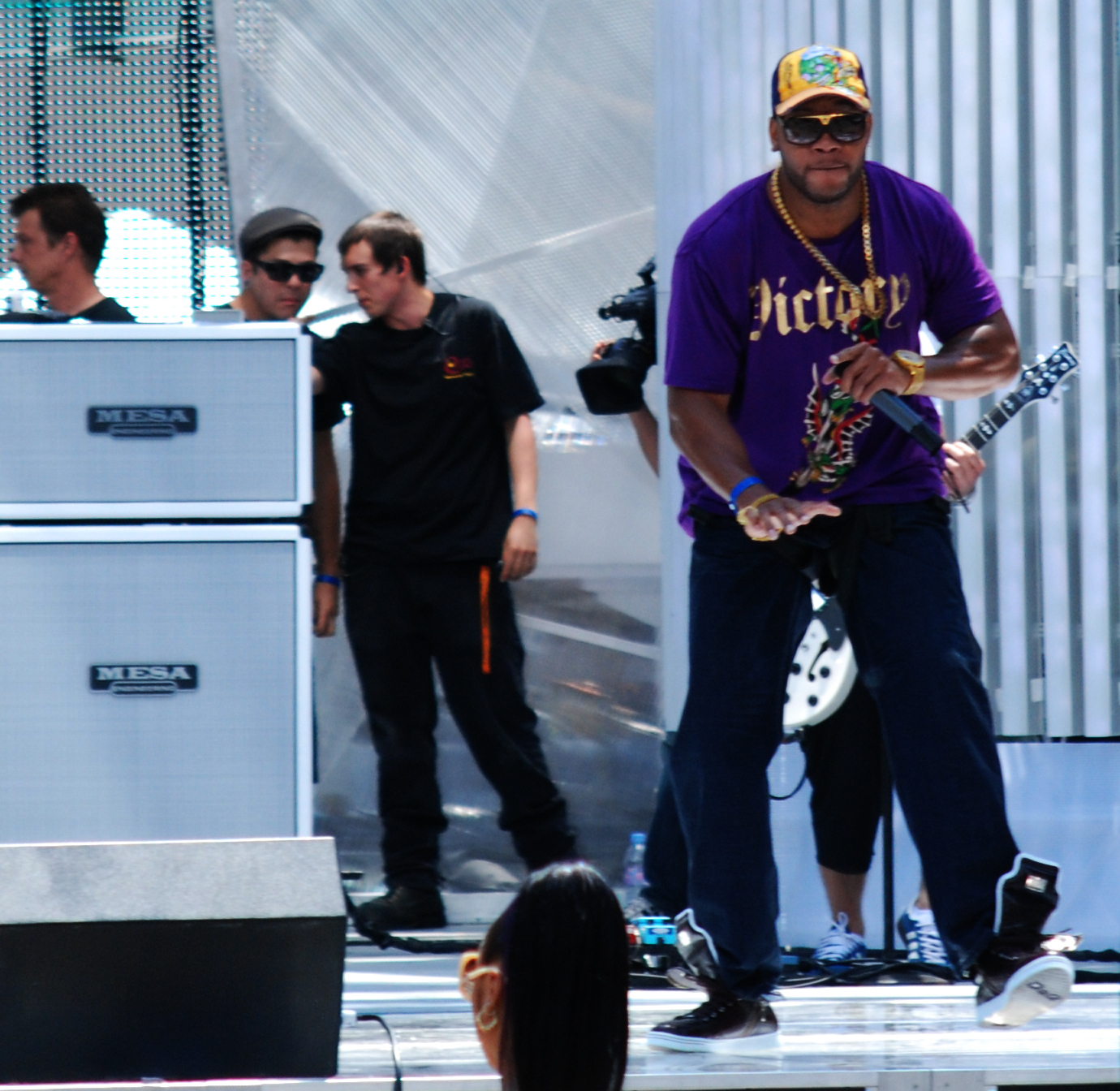
Flo Rida (pictured)'s "Right Round" is one of the longest running singles of 2009. It stood atop the chart for nine non-consecutive weeks, and was his second number one single in the Canadian Hot 100 after "Low" in early 2008.

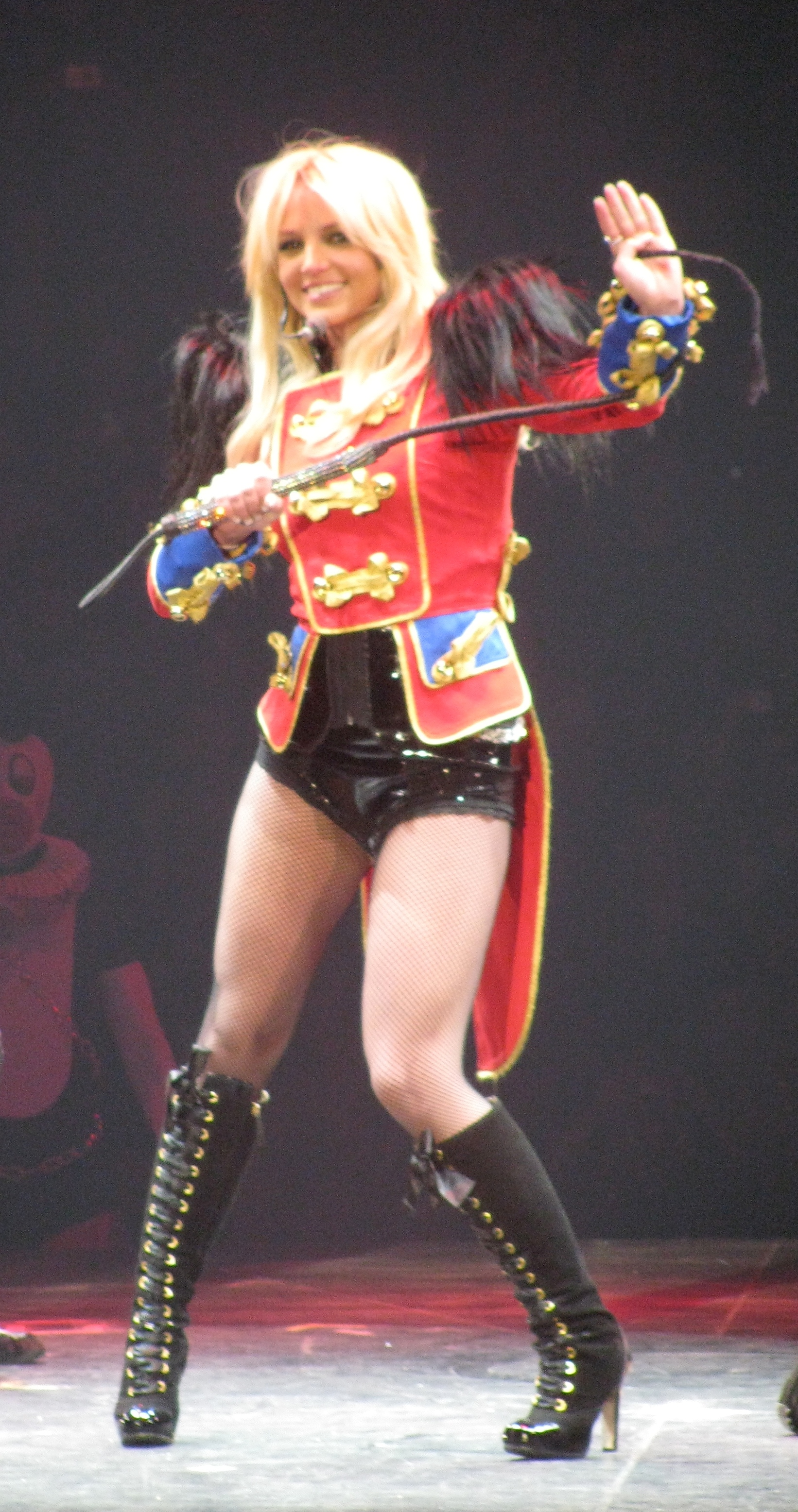
Britney Spears (pictured)'s "3" made the biggest upward movement to number one, jumping from #86 to #1.

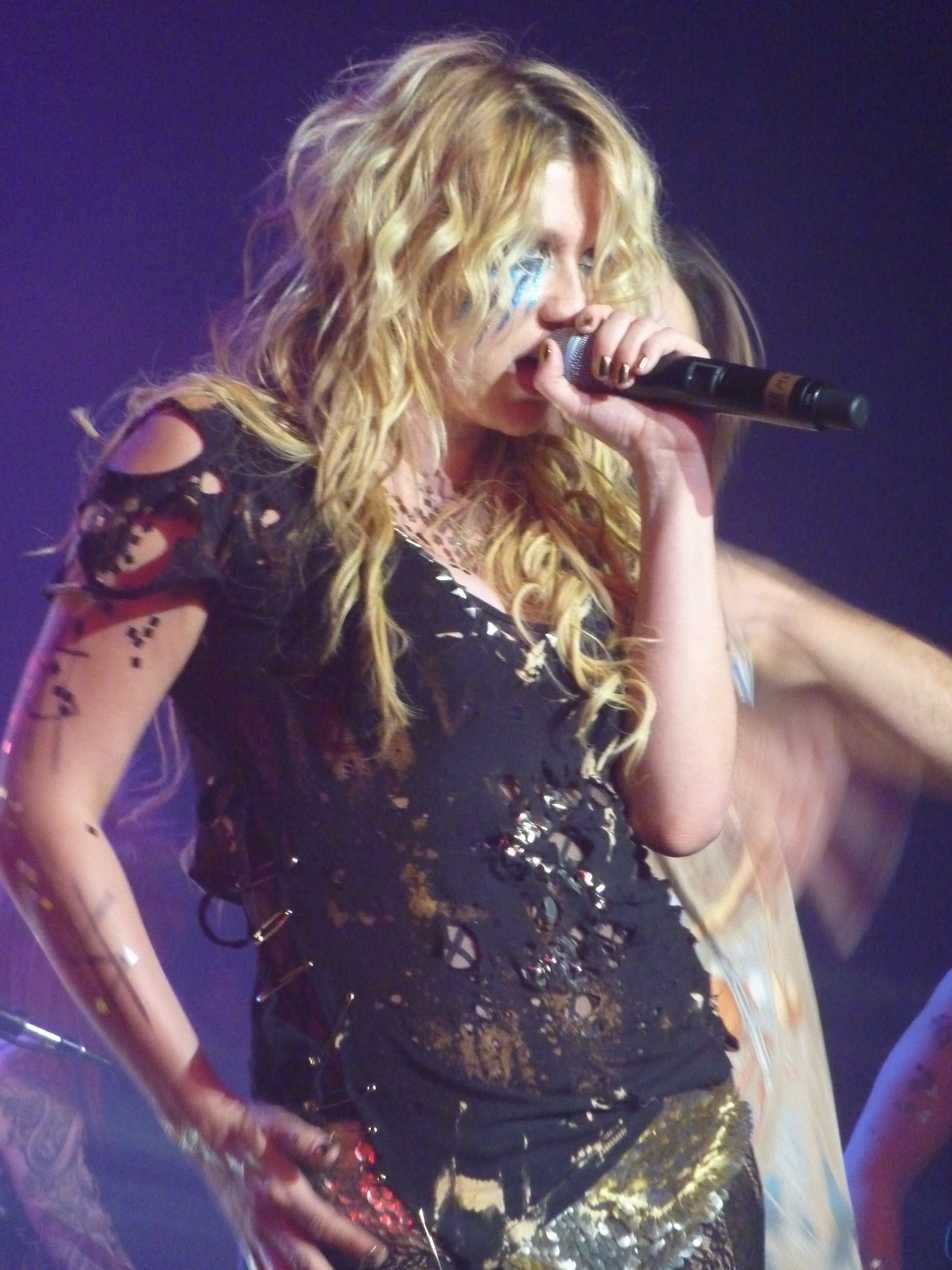
Kesha (pictured) earned her first number-one single with "Tik Tok".

Key
†	Indicates best-performing single of 2009

No.	Issue date	Song	Artist(s)	Ref.
22	January 3	"Poker Face"	Lady Gaga	
22	January 10	"Poker Face"	Lady Gaga	
22	January 17	"Poker Face"	Lady Gaga	
22	January 24	"Poker Face"	Lady Gaga	
22	January 31	"Poker Face"	Lady Gaga	
23	February 7	"My Life Would Suck Without You"	Kelly Clarkson	
re	February 14	"Poker Face"	Lady Gaga	
24	February 21	"Crack a Bottle"	Eminem, Dr. Dre and 50 Cent	
25	February 28	"Right Round"	Flo Rida	
25	March 7	"Right Round"	Flo Rida	
25	March 14	"Right Round"	Flo Rida	
25	March 21	"Right Round"	Flo Rida	
25	March 28	"Right Round"	Flo Rida	
25	April 4	"Right Round"	Flo Rida	
25	April 11	"Right Round"	Flo Rida	
26	April 18	"Boom Boom Pow"	The Black Eyed Peas	
re	April 25	"Right Round"	Flo Rida	
re	May 2	"Right Round"	Flo Rida	
re	May 9	"Boom Boom Pow"	The Black Eyed Peas	
re	May 16	"Boom Boom Pow"	The Black Eyed Peas	
re	May 23	"Boom Boom Pow"	The Black Eyed Peas	
re	May 30	"Boom Boom Pow"	The Black Eyed Peas	
re	June 6	"Boom Boom Pow"	The Black Eyed Peas	
re	June 13	"Boom Boom Pow"	The Black Eyed Peas	
re	June 20	"Boom Boom Pow"	The Black Eyed Peas	
re	June 27	"Boom Boom Pow"	The Black Eyed Peas	
27	July 4	"I Gotta Feeling" †	The Black Eyed Peas	
27	July 11	"I Gotta Feeling" †	The Black Eyed Peas	
27	July 18	"I Gotta Feeling" †	The Black Eyed Peas	
27	July 25	"I Gotta Feeling" †	The Black Eyed Peas	
27	August 1	"I Gotta Feeling" †	The Black Eyed Peas	
27	August 8	"I Gotta Feeling" †	The Black Eyed Peas	
27	August 15	"I Gotta Feeling" †	The Black Eyed Peas	
27	August 22	"I Gotta Feeling" †	The Black Eyed Peas	
27	August 29	"I Gotta Feeling" †	The Black Eyed Peas	
27	September 5	"I Gotta Feeling" †	The Black Eyed Peas	
27	September 12	"I Gotta Feeling" †	The Black Eyed Peas	
27	September 19	"I Gotta Feeling" †	The Black Eyed Peas	
27	September 26	"I Gotta Feeling" †	The Black Eyed Peas	
27	October 3	"I Gotta Feeling" †	The Black Eyed Peas	
27	October 10	"I Gotta Feeling" †	The Black Eyed Peas	
27	October 17	"I Gotta Feeling" †	The Black Eyed Peas	
28	October 24	"3"	Britney Spears	
29	October 31	"Sexy Chick"	David Guetta featuring Akon	
29	November 7	"Sexy Chick"	David Guetta featuring Akon	
30	November 14	"Bad Romance"	Lady Gaga	
31	November 21	"Tik Tok"	Kesha	
31	November 28	"Tik Tok"	Kesha	
re	December 5	"Bad Romance"	Lady Gaga	
re	December 12	"Bad Romance"	Lady Gaga	
re	December 19	"Bad Romance"	Lady Gaga	
re	December 26	"Bad Romance"	Lady Gaga	

== See also ==
- 2009 in music
- List of number-one singles in Canada
- List of number-one albums of 2009 (Canada)
