= List of number-one albums of 2009 (Canada) =

These are the Canadian number-one albums of 2009. The chart is compiled by Nielsen Soundscan and published by Jam! Canoe, issued every Sunday. The chart also appears in Billboard magazine as Top Canadian Albums.

Key
†	Indicates best-performing album of 2009

Issue date	Album	Artist
January 3	Dark Horse †	Nickelback
January 10	Circus	Britney Spears
January 17	Dark Horse †	Nickelback
January 24	The Fame	Lady Gaga
January 31	The Fame	Lady Gaga
February 7	Dark Horse †	Nickelback
February 14	Working on a Dream	Bruce Springsteen
February 21	Working on a Dream	Bruce Springsteen
February 28	It's Not Me, It's You	Lily Allen
March 7	Dark Horse †	Nickelback
March 14	Wrath	Lamb of God
March 21	No Line on the Horizon	U2
March 28	No Line on the Horizon	U2
April 4	No Line on the Horizon	U2
April 11	Fais-moi la Tendresse	Ginette Reno
April 18	Star Académie 2009	Various Artists
April 25	We Are the Same	The Tragically Hip
May 2	Hannah Montana: The Movie	Soundtrack
May 9	Hannah Montana: The Movie	Soundtrack
May 16	Mille Excuses Milady	Jean Leloup
May 23	Fais-moi la Tendresse	Ginette Reno
May 30	21st Century Breakdown	Green Day
June 6	Relapse	Eminem
June 13	Relapse	Eminem
June 20	Relapse	Eminem
June 27	The E.N.D.	The Black Eyed Peas
July 4	Lines, Vines and Trying Times	Jonas Brothers
July 11	The E.N.D.	Black Eyed Peas
July 18	The E.N.D.	Black Eyed Peas
July 25^{[A]}	Number Ones	Michael Jackson
August 1	Billy Talent III	Billy Talent
August 8	Billy Talent III	Billy Talent
August 15	The E.N.D.	Black Eyed Peas
August 22	The E.N.D.	Black Eyed Peas
August 29	The E.N.D.	Black Eyed Peas
September 5	The E.N.D.	Black Eyed Peas
September 12	The E.N.D.	Black Eyed Peas
September 19	I Look to You	Whitney Houston
September 26	The Blueprint 3	Jay-Z
October 3	The Resistance	Muse
October 10	Backspacer	Pearl Jam
October 17	Celebration	Madonna
October 24	Crazy Love	Michael Bublé
October 31	Crazy Love	Michael Bublé
November 7	Crazy Love	Michael Bublé
November 14	This Is It	Michael Jackson
November 21	This Is It	Michael Jackson
November 28	The Circle	Bon Jovi
December 5	My World	Justin Bieber
December 12	I Dreamed a Dream	Susan Boyle
December 19	I Dreamed a Dream	Susan Boyle
December 26	I Dreamed a Dream	Susan Boyle

Notes

- A Number Ones by Michael Jackson is considered a catalog album by Billboard. Therefore, the number one album of that week was The E.N.D by Black Eyed Peas on the Billboard Canadian Albums chart.

== See also ==
- List of Hot 100 number-one singles of 2009 (Canada)
