= Ringo (Lorne Greene song) =

Single by Lorne Greene

from the album Welcome to the Ponderosa
- B-side: "Bonanza"
- Released: October 1964
- Recorded: 1964
- Genre: Country
- Length: 3:34 (with spoken prologue); 3:14 (radio edit)
- Label: RCA Victor
- Songwriters: Don Robertson; Hal Blair

Lorne Greene singles chronology
"I'm the Same Ole Me" (1963)	"Ringo" (1964)	"The Man" (1965)

"Ringo" is a popular song written by Don Robertson and Hal Blair. It was a hit single for Canadian-born actor Lorne Greene in 1964. It reached number one on the U.S. Billboard Hot 100 on December 5, 1964, as well as garnering the same spot on the Easy Listening chart, where it retained the position for six weeks. The single also peaked at number 21 on the Hot Country Singles chart. In Canada, it hit number one on the RPM top singles chart on December 7, 1964. At the beginning of 1965 it peaked at #1 on The New Zealand Lever Hit parade.

The song's sole sung lyric is performed by a male chorus while the verses are a spoken-word, first-person account of a Western lawman and his friendship with a notorious gunfighter, known only as Ringo. Greene described the song as about "Johnny Ringo the outlaw", though the account in the song differs from Ringo's life. The song's spoken word format (with a chorus intoning the title of the song) had been used to great effect in 1961 for Jimmy Dean's hit single, "Big Bad John".

== Plot summary ==
The narrator finds a man named Ringo wounded in the back and lying face down in the desert. Finding he is still alive, he uses his knife to extract the bullet and save Ringo's life, nursing him until he is out of danger; Ringo recovers quickly and begins practicing with his gun, with an observation from the narrator that nobody else can draw as fast.

Soon afterward, the two part ways on a mountain crest. The narrator goes and becomes a lawman in the east while Ringo becomes a dangerous outlaw out west. The narrator believes that he will one day have to face Ringo and find out which one will best the other; his prediction becomes a reality when he learns that Ringo is holed up in his town. He goes to face Ringo only to be quickly disarmed, but Ringo spares him, remembering that he had saved his life. With the narrator now blocking his retreat, Ringo steps outside where he is quickly gunned down and killed, to the delight of the town. But years later, after retiring, the narrator places his now-tarnished star on Ringo's grave marker, which nobody can explain.

== Release ==
The "B" side of the disc contained a vocal version of the theme song of Greene's TV show Bonanza, with lyrics that were never used on the show. Like "Bonanza", "Ringo" began as a track on Greene's Welcome to the Ponderosa RCA Victor LP in late 1963. On the album each track was supplemented with an introduction to each song, separately tracked, though these introductions were left off of the single releases.

Greene said the song was written as a typical western ballad, in the vein of "El Paso" by Marty Robbins. Given his fame on "Bonanza", he had asked the two songwriters to come up with a song that fit in with his persona on that show. He also acknowledged that some teens who bought the record were probably expecting it to be about Beatles-drummer Ringo Starr (even though it was never about him) and believed that after listening to it, they would not be disappointed that the song was actually about a western outlaw.

Greene also noted that recording of the album featuring "Ringo" began before the Beatles became popular in the United States. "Ringo" debuted in Billboard in October 1964. At the same time a special promotional recording by Greene (possibly Canadian only) was sent to radio stations to promote the album, where he speaks about seven of the album's tracks, of which "Ringo" was the lead. On it, Greene talks about the probable confusion between his song character and The Beatles and the "wonderful drummer of theirs", assuring the listener that it is not about him. About this time the album had been upgraded to include a notation on the front jacket, FEATURING THE BIG HIT "RINGO".

== Other versions ==
Greene himself recorded a French-language version of "Ringo" with "Du Sable" ("Sand") on the flip side of the 45, released on the RCA Victor Canada International label #57-5623.

A German-language cover by Ferdy changes the meaning somewhat and alters the ending, but is otherwise fairly close to the English version. Like Greene's French-language edition, the single is also backed with a German version of Sand. Tapio Rautavaara also recorded a Finnish language version in the mid-1960s.

In the Sixties and Seventies in Italy a version in Italian language (with the title of "Gringo") became the soundtrack of the TV advertisements of a canned meat brand named MONTANA. In the same period the italian rockstar Adriano Celentano sung this hit as "Ringo" albeit with Italian language lyrics.

A completely sung version of the song was recorded by Riders in the Sky. Their version is a remake of the version done years earlier by the Sons of the Pioneers in which member Tommy Doss sang the lead.

== Parodies ==
In December 1964, the first parody of the song was issued: "Gringo", written by Marty Cooper and H. B. Barnum. Cooper himself would record it under the name "El Clod", a name he had used in 1962 to record a parody on the Challenge label for the song "Wolverton Mountain", which was called "Tijuana Border". This "Ringo" parody would be issued on Vee Jay Records.

Other parodies soon followed, including two by Frank Gallop with his 1966 hit single "The Ballad of Irving" on the Kapp label, which was quickly chased with a sequel, "The Son Of Irving" on the Musicor label (also in 1966). Another was released in the 1980s by Dutch comedian André van Duin (as "Bingo"); and then by Country Yossi and the Shteeble Hoppers (as "Shlomo"). Allan Sherman sang a parody on his special Allan Sherman's Funnyland on January 19, 1965, on which Lorne Greene also sang the original "Ringo." Voice actor Daws Butler recorded a parody called "Bingo, Ringo" where his character, Huckleberry Hound sings about meeting a man who seemed to resemble Ringo Starr, punctuated by energetic percussion.

The 2005 short film Ringo, which used the song along with public-domain footage of John Wayne and Roy Rogers, won the Short Film Award for animated film at the 2005 Seattle International Film Festival.

== Personnel ==
- Lorne Greene - vocals
- Hal Blaine - drums, percussion
- Tommy Tedesco, guitar
