= List of number-one singles of 2007 (Canada) =

From January 2007 to May 2007, the number-one singles in Canada were compiled by the American-based music sales tracking company Nielsen SoundScan. The Canadian Singles Chart, which tracked physical single sales, was compiled every Wednesday by Jam! Canoe and published on Thursdays. The Canadian Digital Song Sales chart, which tracked digital single sales, was compiled and published weekly by Billboard magazine. On March 31, 2007, Billboard created the Canadian Hot 100, a chart specifically designed for Canada and the first Hot 100 chart that Billboard created for a country outside the United States. The chart was made available for the first time via Billboard online services on June 7, 2007, and it served as the successor to the Canadian Digital Song Sales Chart.

== Canadian Singles Chart/Canadian Digital Song Sales: January 2007 – May 2007 ==
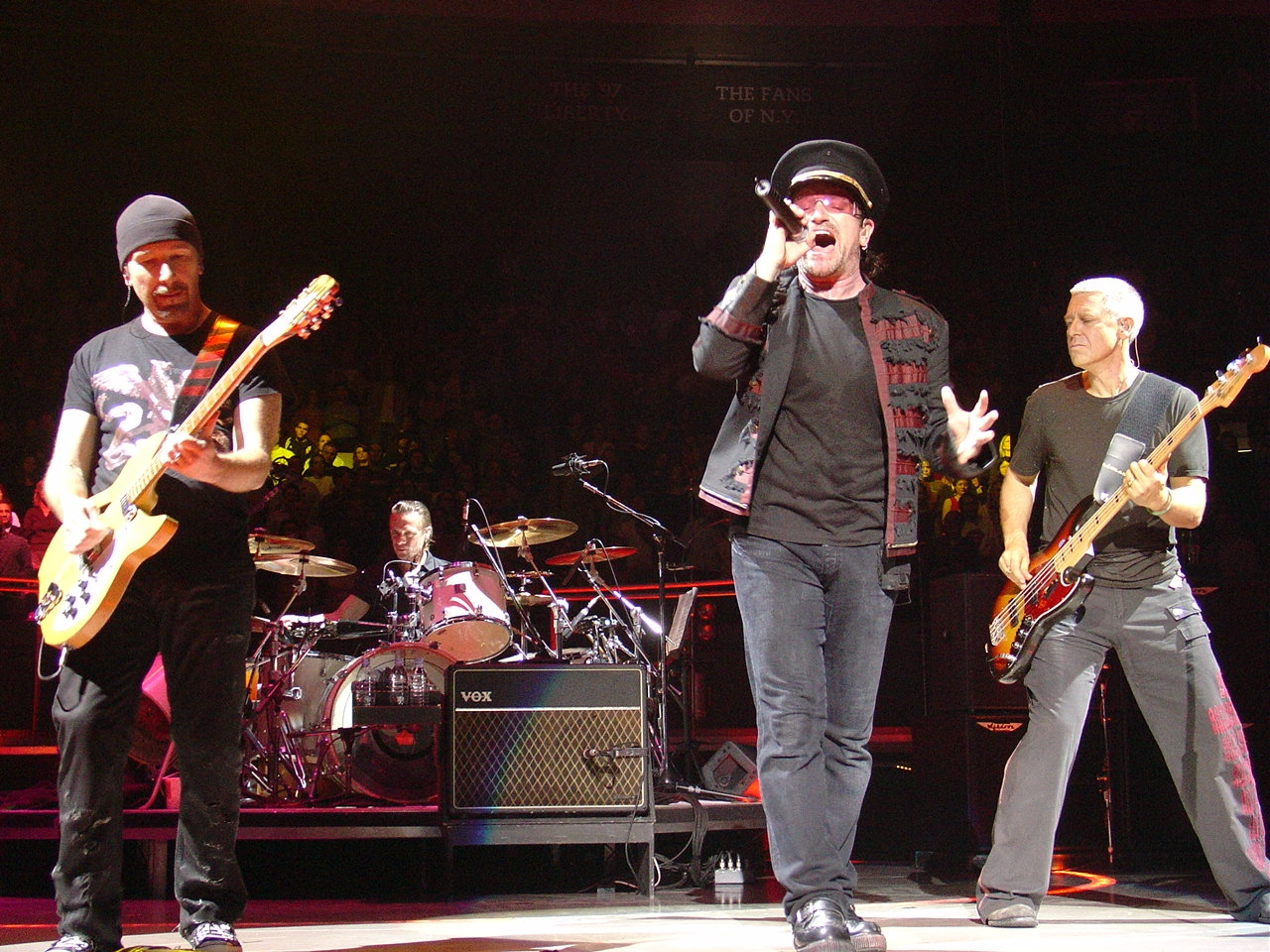
U2's "The Saints Are Coming" spent 3 weeks at number-one, where it was then replaced by the band's "Window in the Skies", which spent another 8 weeks at number-one.

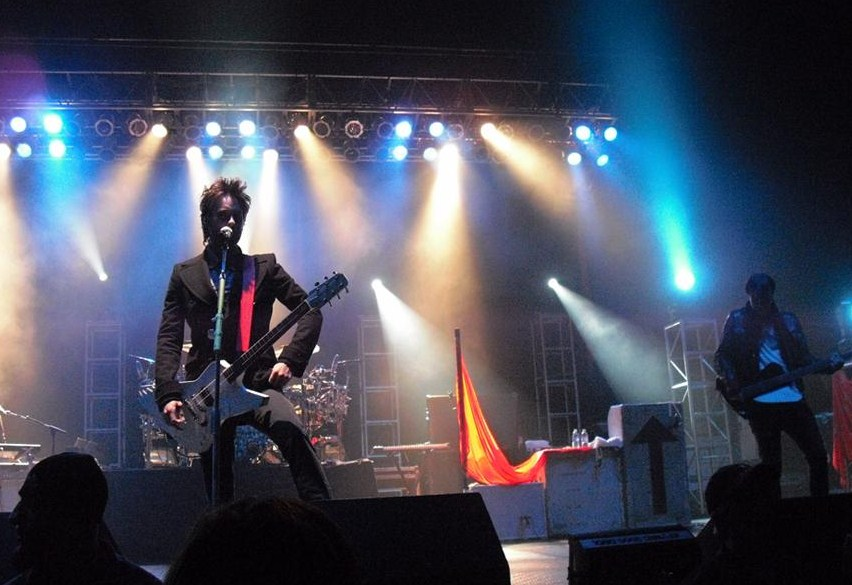
Thirty Seconds to Mars' "The Kill" reached number-one for two weeks in March.

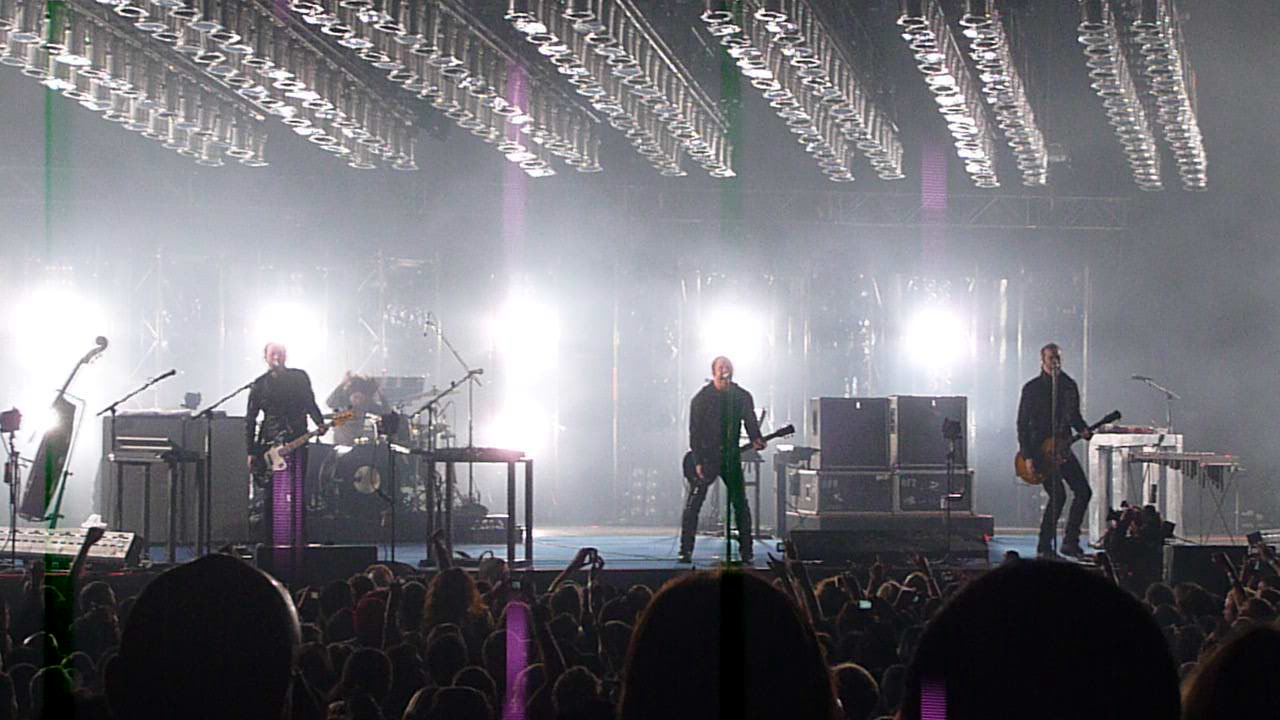
Nine Inch Nails' "Survivalism" was number-one for 5 weeks, before the Canadian Singles Chart was replaced with the Canadian Hot 100.

The following lists the number-one best-selling singles in Canada in 2007, both on the Canadian Singles Chart and on the Canadian Digital Song Sales chart. Only songs released as physical singles qualified to chart on the Canadian Singles Chart, while the Canadian Digital Song Sales chart only tracked the sale of digital singles. During this period, the physical singles market in Canada was very limited in both scope and availability, and in many cases, songs on the Canadian Singles Chart received little or no radio support. For tracks other than those by American Idol or Canadian Idol winners, sales on the Canadian Singles Chart were likely to be less than 1,000 per week, considerably lower than sales on the Canadian Digital Song Sales chart. These two charts were the only singles charts Canadians had until June 2007, when the Canadian Hot 100 was made available to the public, succeeding the Canadian Digital Song Sales Chart.

Note that Billboard publishes charts with an issue date approximately 7–10 days in advance.

=== Physical singles (Canadian Singles Chart) ===
| Issue date | Title | Artist |
|---|---|---|
| January 4 | "The Saints Are Coming" | U2 and Green Day |
| January 11 | "The Saints Are Coming" | U2 and Green Day |
| January 17 | "The Saints Are Coming" | U2 and Green Day |
| January 25 | "Window in the Skies" | U2 |
| February 1 | "Window in the Skies" | U2 |
| February 8 | "Window in the Skies" | U2 |
| February 15 | "Window in the Skies" | U2 |
| February 22 | "Window in the Skies" | U2 |
| March 1 | "Window in the Skies" | U2 |
| March 8 | "Window in the Skies" | U2 |
| March 15 | "Window in the Skies" | U2 |
| March 22 | "The Kill" | Thirty Seconds to Mars |
| March 29 | "The Kill" | Thirty Seconds to Mars |
| April 5 | "Don't Matter" | Akon |
| April 12 | "Don't Matter" | Akon |
| April 19 | "Don't Matter" | Akon |
| April 26 | "Brianstorm" | Arctic Monkeys |
| May 3 | "Survivalism" | Nine Inch Nails |
| May 10 | "Survivalism" | Nine Inch Nails |
| May 17 | "Survivalism" | Nine Inch Nails |
| May 24 | "Survivalism" | Nine Inch Nails |
| May 31 | "Survivalism" | Nine Inch Nails |

=== Digital singles (Canadian Digital Song Sales) ===
| Issue date | Title | Artist |
|---|---|---|
| January 6 | "Say It Right" | Nelly Furtado |
| January 13 | "How to Save a Life" | The Fray |
| January 20 | "How to Save a Life" | The Fray |
| January 27 | "How to Save a Life" | The Fray |
| February 3 (Note: The week of February 3rd is inferred due to limited availability of past Canadian Digital Song Sales charts.) | "How to Save a Life" | The Fray |
| February 10 | "This Ain't a Scene, It's an Arms Race" | Fall Out Boy |
| February 17 | "The Sweet Escape" | Gwen Stefani featuring Akon |
| February 24 | "The Sweet Escape" | Gwen Stefani featuring Akon |
| March 3 | "What Goes Around... Comes Around" | Justin Timberlake |
| March 10 | "What Goes Around... Comes Around" | Justin Timberlake |
| March 17 | "Girlfriend" | Avril Lavigne |
| March 24 | "Girlfriend" | Avril Lavigne |
| March 31 | "Girlfriend" | Avril Lavigne |
| April 7 | "Beautiful Liar" | Beyoncé & Shakira |
| April 14 | "Girlfriend" | Avril Lavigne |
| April 21 | "Girlfriend" | Avril Lavigne |
| April 28 | "Give It to Me" | Timbaland featuring Nelly Furtado & Justin Timberlake |
| May 5 | "Give It to Me" | Timbaland featuring Nelly Furtado & Justin Timberlake |
| May 12 | "Makes Me Wonder" | Maroon 5 |
| May 19 | "Makes Me Wonder" | Maroon 5 |
| May 26 | "Makes Me Wonder" | Maroon 5 |

== Canadian Hot 100: March 2007 – December 2007 ==
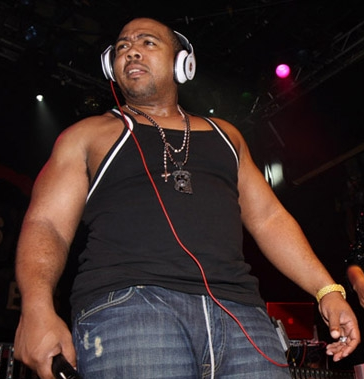
Timbaland (pictured) earned three number-one singles in 2007. "Apologize", which featured OneRepublic, topped the Canadian Hot 100 for the last nine weeks of 2007, becoming the longest-running number-one single of the year.

The Canadian Hot 100 was launched on the issue dated March 31, 2007 and was made available for the first time via Billboard online services on June 7, 2007. It served as the successor to the Canadian Digital Song Sales Chart. The Canadian Hot 100 emulates the formula that drives the US Billboard Hot 100, which has mingled sales and radio data since its launch in 1958. Along with SoundScan's digital sales data, the new chart is driven by BDS' Canada All-Format Airplay, with a panel of more than 100 radio stations. The comprehensive radio panel includes the country's leading top 40, rock, country and adult contemporary stations.

In 2007, eleven singles topped the Canadian Hot 100. Timbaland's "Apologize", featuring OneRepublic, was the longest-running chart-topping single of 2007; it was the number-one single for the last nine weeks of 2007, and the first four weeks in 2008. Rihanna's "Umbrella", featuring Jay-Z, stayed at number one for five straight weeks, while Avril Lavigne's "Girlfriend" and Maroon 5's "Makes Me Wonder" stayed at number one for four weeks. Timbaland was the only artist to have multiple number-one singles in 2007, and his singles were number-one for a combined 14 weeks.

Note that Billboard publishes charts with an issue date approximately 7–10 days in advance.

=== Chart history ===
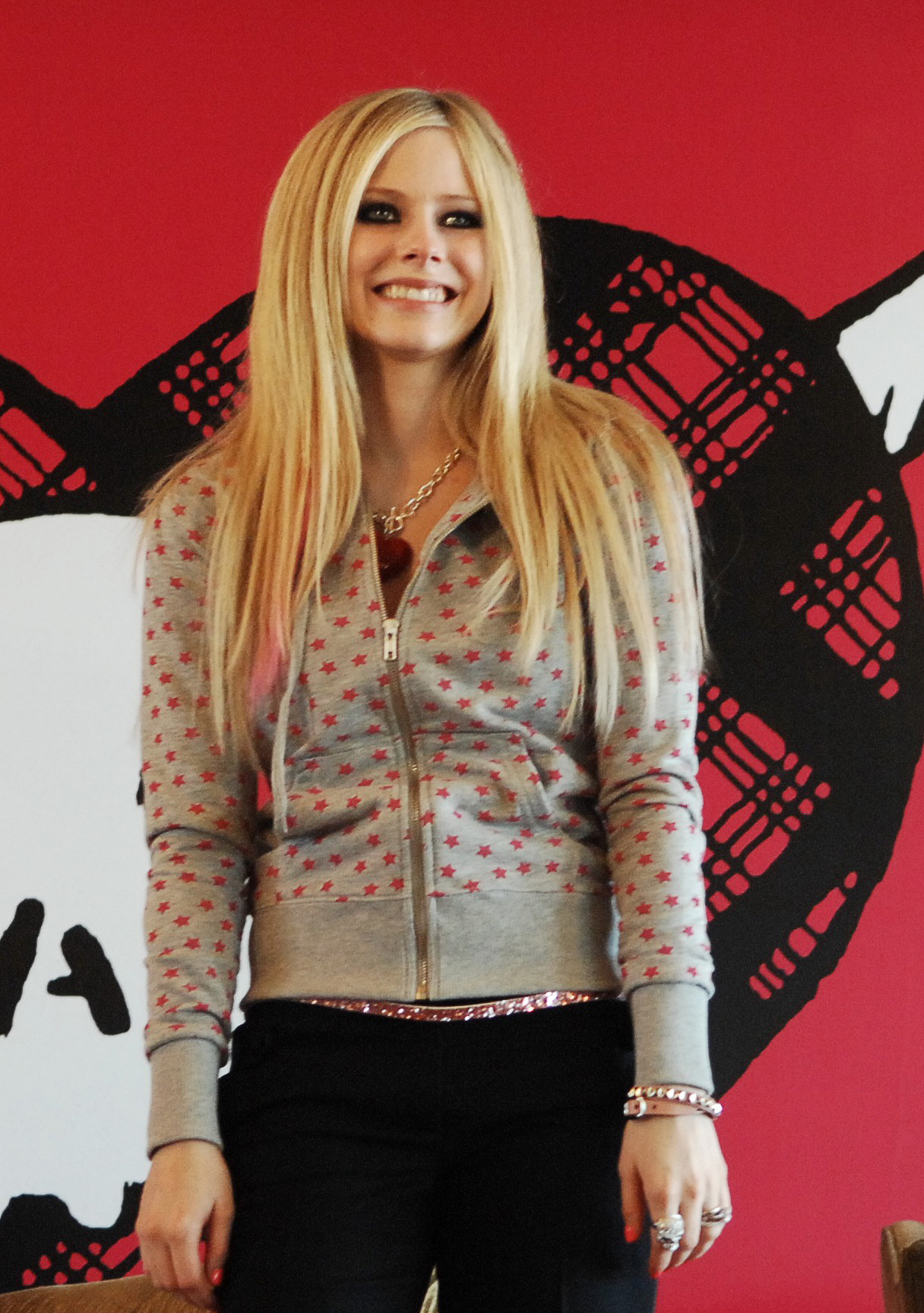
"Girlfriend" by Avril Lavigne (pictured) was the chart's first number-one single.

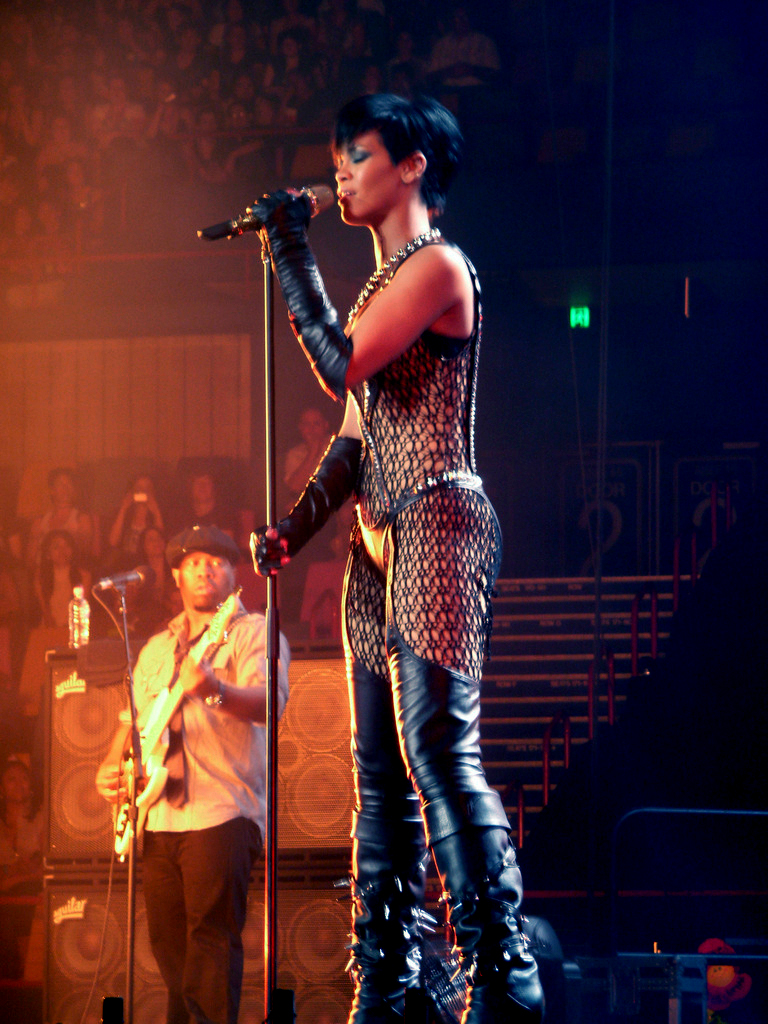
Rihanna (pictured)'s "Umbrella", which featured Jay-Z, topped the Canadian Hot 100 for five consecutive weeks.

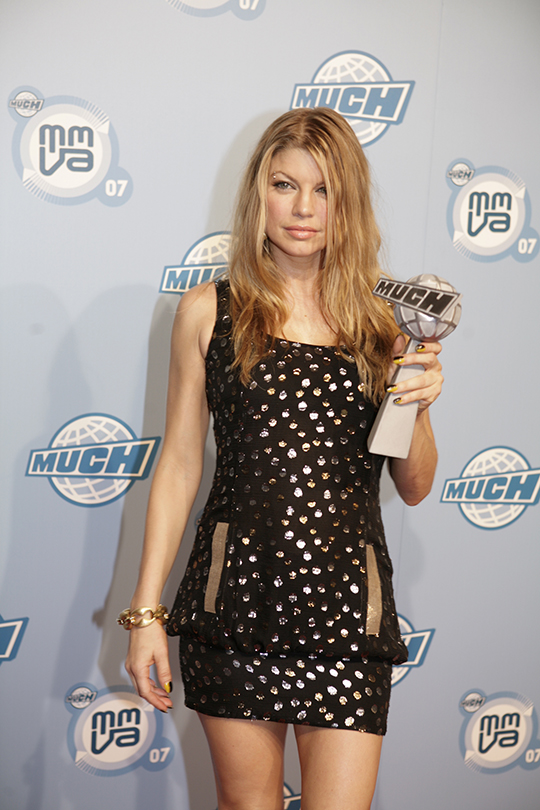
"Big Girls Don't Cry" by Fergie (pictured) stayed in the number-one spot for three consecutive weeks in July.

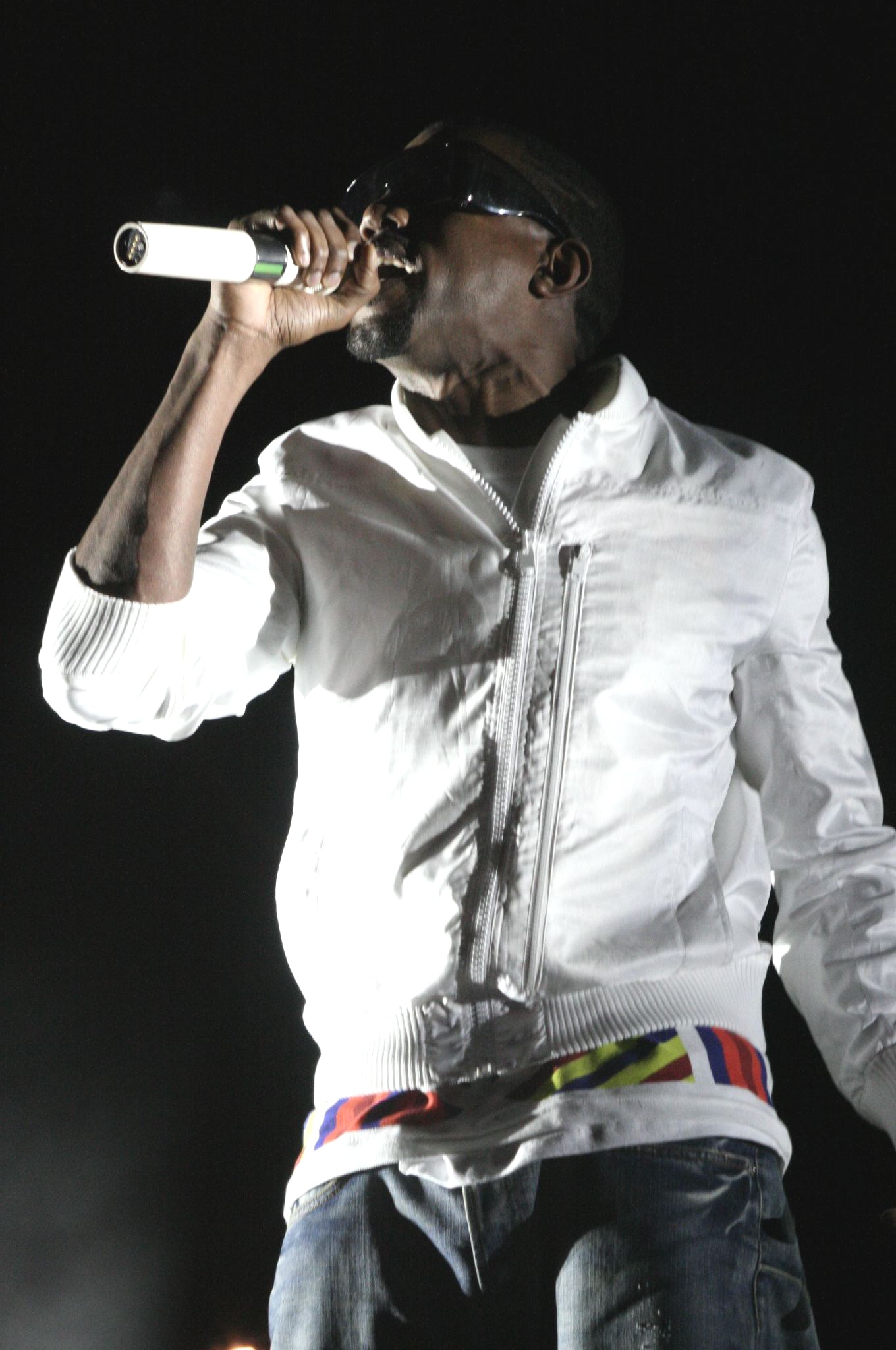
Kanye West (pictured)'s "Stronger" stayed in the number-one spot for 3 weeks, and on the chart for 40 weeks.

| No. | Issue date | Song | Artist(s) | Ref. |
|---|---|---|---|---|
| 1 | March 31 | "Girlfriend" | Avril Lavigne | |
| 1 | April 7 | "Girlfriend" | Avril Lavigne | |
| 1 | April 14 | "Girlfriend" | Avril Lavigne | |
| 1 | April 21 | "Girlfriend" | Avril Lavigne | |
| 2 | April 28 | "Give It to Me" | Timbaland featuring Nelly Furtado and Justin Timberlake | |
| 2 | May 5 | "Give It to Me" | Timbaland featuring Nelly Furtado and Justin Timberlake | |
| 3 | May 12 | "Makes Me Wonder" | Maroon 5 | |
| 3 | May 19 | "Makes Me Wonder" | Maroon 5 | |
| 3 | May 26 | "Makes Me Wonder" | Maroon 5 | |
| 3 | June 2 | "Makes Me Wonder" | Maroon 5 | |
| 4 | June 9 | "Umbrella" | Rihanna featuring Jay-Z | |
| 4 | June 16 | "Umbrella" | Rihanna featuring Jay-Z | |
| 4 | June 23 | "Umbrella" | Rihanna featuring Jay-Z | |
| 4 | June 30 | "Umbrella" | Rihanna featuring Jay-Z | |
| 4 | July 7 | "Umbrella" | Rihanna featuring Jay-Z | |
| 5 | July 14 | "Big Girls Don't Cry" | Fergie | |
| 5 | July 21 | "Big Girls Don't Cry" | Fergie | |
| 5 | July 28 | "Big Girls Don't Cry" | Fergie | |
| 6 | August 4 | "Hey There Delilah" | Plain White T's | |
| 7 | August 11 | "Beautiful Girls" | Sean Kingston | |
| 7 | August 18 | "Beautiful Girls" | Sean Kingston | |
| re | August 25 | "Hey There Delilah" | Plain White T's | |
| re | September 1 | "Hey There Delilah" | Plain White T's | |
| 8 | September 8 | "The Way I Are" | Timbaland featuring Keri Hilson | |
| 8 | September 15 | "The Way I Are" | Timbaland featuring Keri Hilson | |
| 8 | September 22 | "The Way I Are" | Timbaland featuring Keri Hilson | |
| 9 | September 29 | "Stronger" | Kanye West | |
| 9 | October 6 | "Stronger" | Kanye West | |
| 10 | October 13 | "Gimme More" | Britney Spears | |
| 10 | October 20 | "Gimme More" | Britney Spears | |
| re | October 27 | "Stronger" | Kanye West | |
| 11 | November 3 | "Apologize" | Timbaland featuring OneRepublic | |
| 11 | November 10 | "Apologize" | Timbaland featuring OneRepublic | |
| 11 | November 17 | "Apologize" | Timbaland featuring OneRepublic | |
| 11 | November 24 | "Apologize" | Timbaland featuring OneRepublic | |
| 11 | December 1 | "Apologize" | Timbaland featuring OneRepublic | |
| 11 | December 8 | "Apologize" | Timbaland featuring OneRepublic | |
| 11 | December 15 | "Apologize" | Timbaland featuring OneRepublic | |
| 11 | December 22 | "Apologize" | Timbaland featuring OneRepublic | |
| 11 | December 29 | "Apologize" | Timbaland featuring OneRepublic | |

== See also ==
- 2007 in music
- List of number-one singles in Canada
