= List of number-one singles of 1967 (Canada) =

This is a list of the weekly Canadian RPM magazine (Note: The magazine's weekly record charts were digitized by the AV Trust. The collection is archived by Library and Archives Canada here. The PDF text search does not work unless you have additional software installed. You must view each entry on the chart for a match.) number one Top Singles chart of 1967. (Note: A collection of all the .pdf files cited is available here.) (Note: † On 21 March 1966, the chart became the RPM 100, as expanded to the top 100 singles.)

== Number-one singles ==
†	Indicates best-performing single of 1967.

Volume:Issue	Issue Date(s)	Song	Artist
6:19	2 January	"I'm a Believer"	The Monkees
6:20	14 January	"Snoopy vs. the Red Baron"	The Royal Guardsmen
6:21	21 January	"Snoopy vs. the Red Baron"	The Royal Guardsmen
6:22	28 January	"Snoopy vs. the Red Baron"	The Royal Guardsmen
6:23	4 February	"Georgy Girl"	The Seekers
6:24	11 February	"Georgy Girl"	The Seekers
6:25	18 February	"Kind of a Drag"	The Buckinghams
6:26	25 February	"Kind of a Drag"	The Buckinghams
7:1	4 March	"Gimme Some Lovin'"	Spencer Davis Group
7:2	11 March	"Love Is Here and Now You're Gone"	The Supremes
7:3	18 March	"Baby I Need Your Lovin'"	Johnny Rivers
7:4	25 March	"Penny Lane"	The Beatles
7:5	1 April	"A Little Bit Me, A Little Bit You"	The Monkees
7:6	8 April	"A Little Bit Me, A Little Bit You"	The Monkees
7:7	15 April	"A Little Bit Me, A Little Bit You"	The Monkees
7:8	22 April	"Canada"	Young Canada Singers
7:9	29 April	"Canada"	Young Canada Singers
7:10	6 May	"Somethin' Stupid"	Nancy Sinatra & Frank Sinatra
7:11	13 May	"I'm a Man"	Spencer Davis Group
7:12	20 May	"Happy Jack"	The Who
7:13	27 May	"I Got Rhythm"	The Happenings
7:14	3 June	"Groovin'"	Young Rascals
7:15	10 June	"Creeque Alley"	The Mamas & the Papas
7:16	17 June	"Somebody to Love"	Jefferson Airplane
7:17	24 June	"She'd Rather Be with Me"	The Turtles
7:18	1 July	"She'd Rather Be with Me"	The Turtles
7:19	8 July	"Little Bit O' Soul"	Music Explosion
7:20	15 July	"Windy"	The Association
7:21	22 July	"Up, Up and Away"	The 5th Dimension
7:22	29 July	"White Rabbit"	Jefferson Airplane
7:23	5 August	"White Rabbit"	Jefferson Airplane
7:24	12 August	"A Whiter Shade of Pale"	Procol Harum
7:25	19 August	"Pleasant Valley Sunday"	The Monkees
7:26	26 August	"All You Need Is Love"	The Beatles
8:1	2 September	"A Girl Like You"	Young Rascals
8.2	9 September	"All You Need Is Love"	The Beatles
8:3	16 September	"Ode to Billie Joe"	Bobbie Gentry
8:4	23 September	"San Franciscan Nights"	Eric Burdon
8:5	30 September	"The Letter" †	The Box Tops
8:6	7 October	"To Sir With Love"/"The Boat That I Row"	Lulu
8:7	14 October	"I Had a Dream"	Paul Revere & the Raiders
8:8	21 October	"Never My Love"	The Association
8:9	28 October	"How Can I Be Sure"	Young Rascals
8:10	4 November	"People Are Strange"	The Doors
8:11	11 November	"Your Precious Love"	Marvin Gaye & Tammi Terrell
8:12	18 November	"The Rain, The Park & Other Things"	The Cowsills
8:13	25 November	"The Rain, The Park & Other Things"	The Cowsills
8:14	2 December	"Please Love Me Forever"	Bobby Vinton
8:15	9 December	"Lazy Day"	Spanky and Our Gang
8:16	16 December	"Daydream Believer"	The Monkees
8:17	23 December	"Hello, Goodbye"	The Beatles
8:18	30 December	"Hello, Goodbye"	The Beatles

== See also ==
- 1967 in music
- List of Billboard Hot 100 number ones of 1967 (United States)
- List of Cashbox Top 100 number-one singles of 1967
