= List of RPM number-one adult contemporary singles of 1996 =

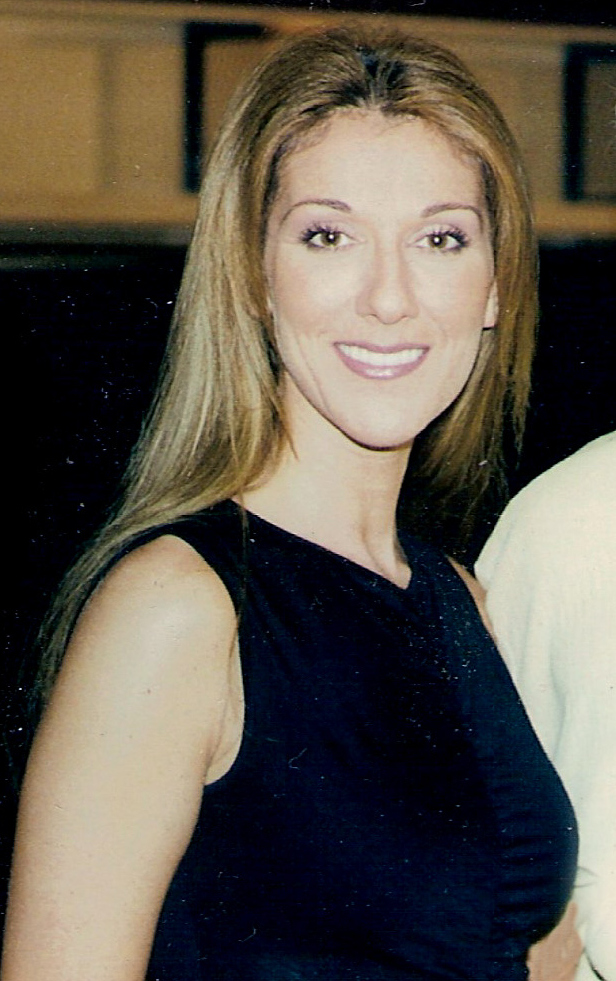
Celine Dion spent a total of 11 non-consecutive weeks at number one with "Because You Loved Me", the best-performing adult contemporary single in Canada in 1996.

RPM was a Canadian music industry magazine that published the best-performing singles charts in Canada from 1964 to 2000. In 1996, RPM published a chart for top-performing singles played in adult contemporary radio stations in Canada. The chart, entitled Adult Contemporary Tracks, undergone numerous name changes throughout its existence, becoming Adult Contemporary in August 1984. In April 1992, it became Adult Contemporary Tracks, reflecting its increased inclusion of radio-only singles, and the chart maintained that naming until the magazine ceased publication in November 2000. In 1996, eighteen individual songs topped the chart, which contained 60 positions and is compiled based on a song's cumulative adult contemporary radio airplay points.

In RPM's first issue for 1996, the first adult contemporary number-one was Whitney Houston's "Exhale (Shoop Shoop)", continuing from where it left off in 1995, until it was knocked off the top of the chart by Madonna's "You'll See", which was number one for five weeks. It was then followed by Mariah Carey's "One Sweet Day" (with Boyz II Men), which topped the chart for two weeks in February; it would later be replaced at number one by Hootie & the Blowfish's "Time", itself replaced later by "Jesus to a Child" by George Michael. Carey would have also a second number-one adult contemporary single with "Always Be My Baby", which spent two non-consecutive weeks. The final single of 1996 was "Mouth" by Merril Bainbridge, which reached number one by the third week of December, when the magazine's year-end charts were published.

The best-performing single of the year was "Because You Loved Me" by Celine Dion, which spent a total of eleven non-consecutive weeks at number one, including seven consecutive weeks when its weeks-long number-one run on the chart was broken by Mariah Carey's "Always Be My Baby" the week of May 20. Dion would also have a second number-one later in 1996, when "It's All Coming Back to Me Now" reached number one the week of September 23 for a total of five non-consecutive weeks. The only other artists to have more than one Canadian number-one adult contemporary single include George Michael and Mariah Carey, having two each. Besides Dion, two other Canadian artists, Jann Arden and Bryan Adams, have at least one number-one on the chart, both having one single each.

Key
† Indicates best-performing adult contemporary single of 1996

== Chart history ==
Chart history
Issue date	Title	Artist(s)	Ref.
January 1 (Note: Due to a two-week break in publication for the 1995/1996 Christmas and New Year period, the week of January 1 is inferred.)	"Exhale (Shoop Shoop)"	Whitney Houston	
January 8	"Exhale (Shoop Shoop)"	Whitney Houston	
January 15	"You'll See"	Madonna	
January 22	"You'll See"	Madonna	
January 29	"You'll See"	Madonna	
February 5	"You'll See"	Madonna	
February 12	"You'll See"	Madonna	
February 19	"One Sweet Day"	Mariah Carey and Boyz II Men	
February 26	"One Sweet Day"	Mariah Carey and Boyz II Men	
March 4	"Time"	Hootie & the Blowfish	
March 11	"Jesus to a Child"	George Michael	
March 18	"Missing"	Everything but the Girl	
March 25	"Missing"	Everything but the Girl	
April 1	"Because You Loved Me"	Celine Dion	
April 8	"Because You Loved Me"	Celine Dion	
April 15	"Because You Loved Me"	Celine Dion	
April 22	"Because You Loved Me"	Celine Dion	
April 29	"Because You Loved Me"	Celine Dion	
May 6	"Because You Loved Me"	Celine Dion	
May 13	"Because You Loved Me"	Celine Dion	
May 20	"Always Be My Baby"	Mariah Carey	
May 27	"Because You Loved Me"	Celine Dion	
June 3	"Because You Loved Me"	Celine Dion	
June 10	"Because You Loved Me"	Celine Dion	
June 17	"Always Be My Baby"	Mariah Carey	
June 24	"Fastlove"	George Michael	
July 1	"Fastlove"	George Michael	
July 8	"Give Me One Reason"	Tracy Chapman	
July 15	"Give Me One Reason"	Tracy Chapman	
July 22	"Let It Flow"	Toni Braxton	
July 29	"Change the World"	Eric Clapton	
August 5	"Change the World"	Eric Clapton	
August 12	"Because You Loved Me"	Celine Dion	
August 19	"Looking for It"	Jann Arden	
August 26	"Give Me One Reason"	Tracy Chapman	
September 2	"Give Me One Reason"	Tracy Chapman	
September 9	"I Love You Always Forever"	Donna Lewis	
September 16	"I Love You Always Forever"	Donna Lewis	
September 23	"It's All Coming Back to Me Now"	Celine Dion	
September 30	"It's All Coming Back to Me Now"	Celine Dion	
October 7	"It's All Coming Back to Me Now"	Celine Dion	
October 14	"Change the World"	Eric Clapton	
October 21	"I Love You Always Forever"	Donna Lewis	
October 28	"I Love You Always Forever"	Donna Lewis	
November 4	"It's All Coming Back to Me Now"	Celine Dion	
November 11	"It's All Coming Back to Me Now"	Celine Dion	
November 18	"Let's Make a Night to Remember"	Bryan Adams	
November 25	"Let's Make a Night to Remember"	Bryan Adams	
December 2	"When You Love a Woman"	Journey	
December 9	"When You Love a Woman"	Journey	
December 16	"Mouth"	Merril Bainbridge	
December 23 (Note: Due to a two-week break in publication for the 1996/1997 Christmas and New Year period, the weeks of December 23 and 30 are inferred.)	"Mouth"	Merril Bainbridge	
December 30	"Mouth"	Merril Bainbridge	
