= List of number-one singles of 1962 (Canada) =

The following is a list of the CHUM Chart number-one singles of 1962.

Issue date	Song	Artist	Reference
January 1	"The Twist"	Chubby Checker	
January 8	"The Twist"	Chubby Checker	
January 15	"The Twist"	Chubby Checker	
January 22	"The Twist"	Chubby Checker	
January 29	"The Twist"	Chubby Checker	
February 5	"The Twist"	Chubby Checker	
February 12	"My Boomerang Won't Come Back"	Charlie Drake	
February 19	"Duke of Earl"	Gene Chandler	
February 26	"Duke of Earl"	Gene Chandler	
March 5	"Duke of Earl"	Gene Chandler	
March 12	"Johnny Angel"	Shelley Fabares	
March 19	"Johnny Angel"	Shelley Fabares	
March 26	"Johnny Angel"	Shelley Fabares	
April 2	"Good Luck Charm" / "Anything That's Part of You"	Elvis Presley	
April 9	"Shout! Shout! (Knock Yourself Out)"	Ernie Maresca	
April 16	"Shout! Shout! (Knock Yourself Out)"	Ernie Maresca	
April 23	"Shout! Shout! (Knock Yourself Out)"	Ernie Maresca	
April 30	"Soldier Boy"	The Shirelles	
May 7	"Soldier Boy"	The Shirelles	
May 14	"Soldier Boy"	The Shirelles	
May 21	"Wolverton Mountain"	Claude King	
May 28	"Wolverton Mountain"	Claude King	
June 4	"Wolverton Mountain"	Claude King	
June 11	"I Can't Stop Loving You"	Ray Charles	
June 18	"I Can't Stop Loving You"	Ray Charles	
June 25	"Roses Are Red"	Bobby Vinton	
July 2	"Roses Are Red"	Bobby Vinton	
July 9	"Roses Are Red"	Bobby Vinton	
July 16	"Sealed with a Kiss"	Brian Hyland	
July 23	"Girls, Girls, Girls"	Eddie Hodges	
July 30	"Breaking Up Is Hard to Do"	Neil Sedaka	
August 6	"Breaking Up Is Hard to Do"	Neil Sedaka	
August 13	"The Loco-Motion"	Little Eva	
August 20	"The Loco-Motion"	Little Eva	
August 27	"Sheila"	Tommy Roe	
September 3	"Sherry"	The Four Seasons	
September 10	"Sherry"	The Four Seasons	
September 17	"Sherry"	The Four Seasons	
September 24	"Sherry"	The Four Seasons	
October 1	"Sherry"	The Four Seasons	
October 8	"Monster Mash"	Bobby Pickett	
October 15	"Monster Mash"	Bobby Pickett	
October 22	"He's a Rebel"	The Crystals	
October 29	"He's a Rebel"	The Crystals	
November 5	"Return to Sender"	Elvis Presley	
November 12	"Return to Sender"	Elvis Presley	
November 19	"Big Girls Don't Cry"	The Four Seasons	
November 26	"Big Girls Don't Cry"	The Four Seasons	
December 3	"Telstar"	The Tornados	
December 10	"Telstar"	The Tornados	
December 17	"From a Jack to a King"	Ned Miller	
December 24	"From a Jack to a King"	Ned Miller	
December 31	"From a Jack to a King"	Ned Miller	

== See also ==
- 1962 in music
