= List of number-one singles of 1958 (Canada) =

The following is a list of the CHUM Chart number-one singles of 1958.

Issue date	Song	Artist	Reference
January 6	"At the Hop"	Danny & the Juniors	
January 13	"Sail Along Silvery Moon"	Billy Vaughn	
January 20	"Sail Along Silvery Moon"	Billy Vaughn	
January 27	"Sail Along Silvery Moon"	Billy Vaughn	
February 3	"I Beg of You" / "Don't"	Elvis Presley	
February 10	"Get a Job"	The Silhouettes	
February 17	"I Beg of You" / "Don't"	Elvis Presley	
February 24	"Maybe"	The Chantels	
March 3	"Maybe"	The Chantels	
March 10	"Sweet Little Sixteen"	Chuck Berry	
March 17	"Sweet Little Sixteen"	Chuck Berry	
March 24	"Tequila"	The Champs	
March 31	"Lollipop"	The Chordettes	
April 7	"Who's Sorry Now?"	Connie Francis	
April 14	"Who's Sorry Now?"	Connie Francis	
April 21	"Wear My Ring Around Your Neck"	Elvis Presley	
April 28	"Witch Doctor"	David Seville	
May 5	"All I Have to Do Is Dream"	The Everly Brothers	
May 12	"All I Have to Do Is Dream"	The Everly Brothers	
May 19	"All I Have to Do Is Dream"	The Everly Brothers	
May 26	"All I Have to Do Is Dream"	The Everly Brothers	
June 2	"All I Have to Do Is Dream"	The Everly Brothers	
June 9	"Do You Want to Dance"	Bobby Freeman	
June 16	"The Purple People Eater"	Sheb Wooley	
June 23	"The Purple People Eater"	Sheb Wooley	
June 30	"The Purple People Eater"	Sheb Wooley	
July 7	"Hard Headed Woman"	Elvis Presley	
July 14	"Hard Headed Woman"	Elvis Presley	
July 21	"Hard Headed Woman"	Elvis Presley	
July 28	"Poor Little Fool"	Ricky Nelson	
August 4	"Poor Little Fool"	Ricky Nelson	
August 11	"Poor Little Fool"	Ricky Nelson	
August 18	"My True Love"	Jack Scott	
August 25	"Bird Dog" / "Devoted to You"	The Everly Brothers	
September 1	"Bird Dog" / "Devoted to You"	The Everly Brothers	
September 8	"Bird Dog" / "Devoted to You"	The Everly Brothers	
September 15	"Susie Darlin'"	Robin Luke	
September 22	"Susie Darlin'"	Robin Luke	
September 29	"It's All in the Game"	Tommy Edwards	
October 6	"It's All in the Game"	Tommy Edwards	
October 13	"It's All in the Game"	Tommy Edwards	
October 20	"It's Only Make Believe"	Conway Twitty	
November 3	"Tom Dooley"	The Kingston Trio	
November 10	"Tom Dooley"	The Kingston Trio	
November 17	"I Got Stung" / "One Night"	Elvis Presley	
November 24	"I Got Stung" / "One Night"	Elvis Presley	
December 1	"To Know Him Is to Love Him"	The Teddy Bears	
December 8	"To Know Him Is to Love Him"	The Teddy Bears	
December 15	"The Chipmunk Song"	The Chipmunks	
December 22	"The Chipmunk Song"	The Chipmunks	
December 29	"The Chipmunk Song"	The Chipmunks	
