= List of RPM number-one adult contemporary singles of 1984 =

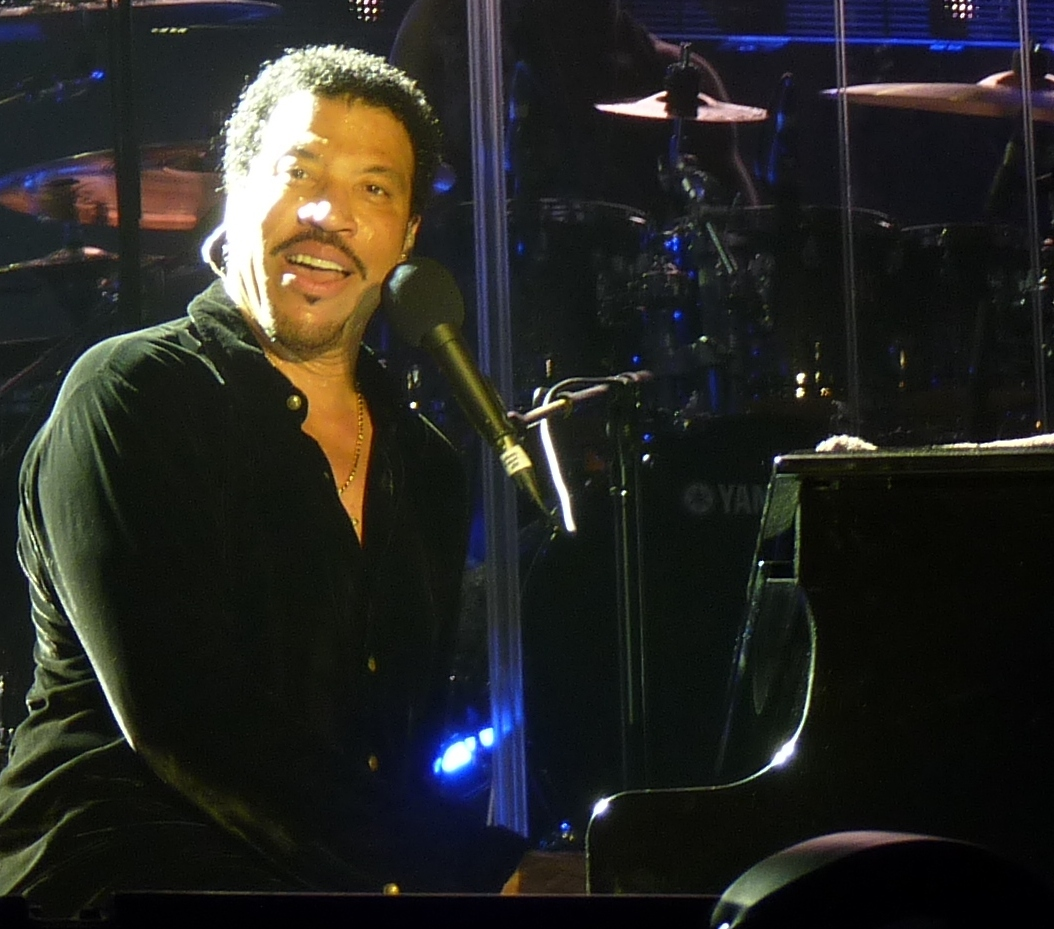
Lionel Richie (pictured in 2011) had four number-one singles and spent a total of seven weeks at number one in the Canadian adult contemporary chart in 1984.

In 1984, RPM magazine published a chart for top-performing singles in the adult contemporary category in Canada. The chart, entitled Contemporary Adult in the beginning of 1984, has undergone numerous name changes throughout its existence and has become Adult Contemporary from August 1984 until the magazine's final publication in November 2000. In 1984, thirty-seven individual songs topped the chart, which contained 30 positions and is based on record sales and adult contemporary radio station playlist submissions.

== Chart history ==
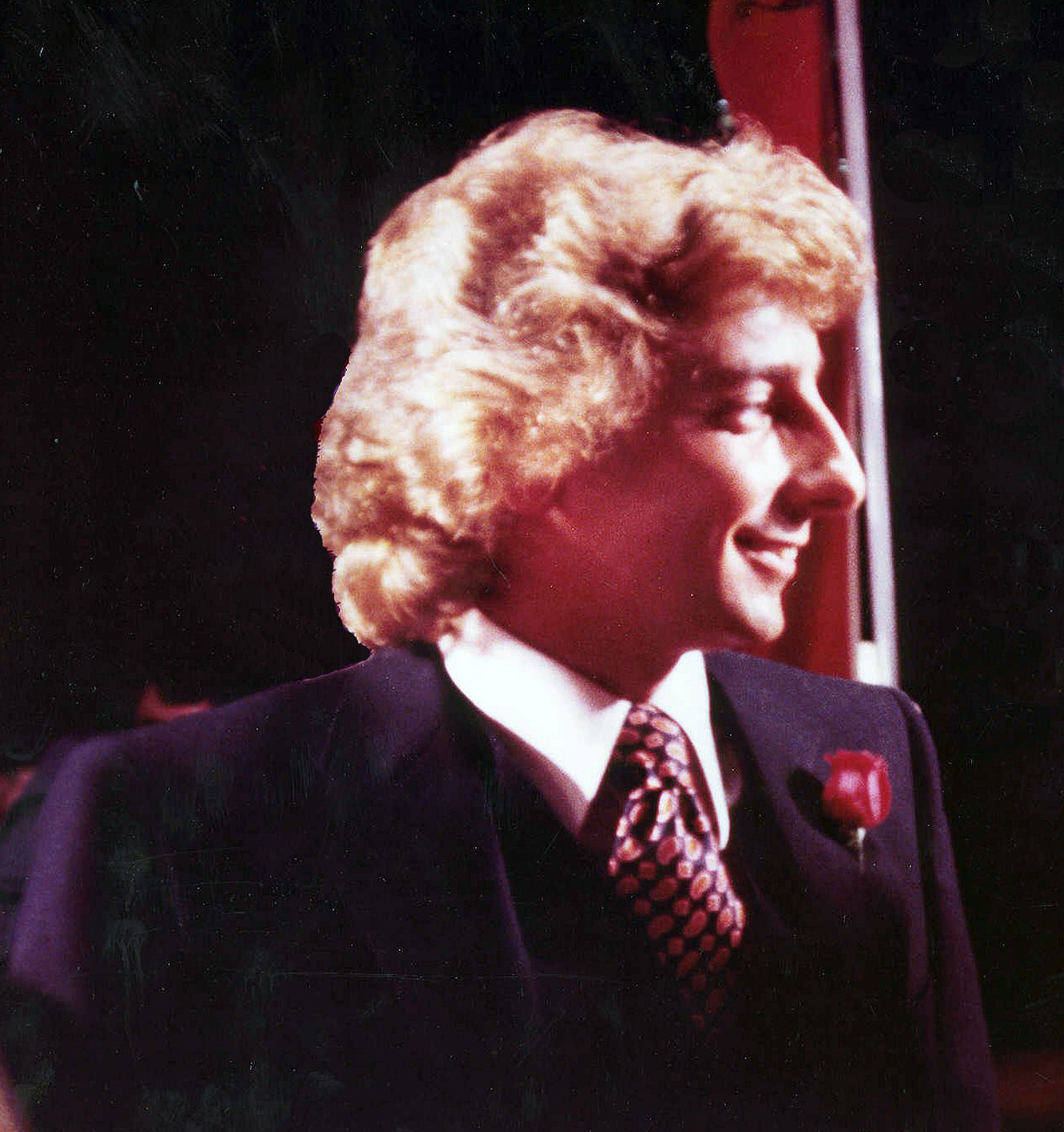
Barry Manilow reached number one for two non-consecutive weeks with his cover of Meat Loaf's "Read 'Em and Weep".

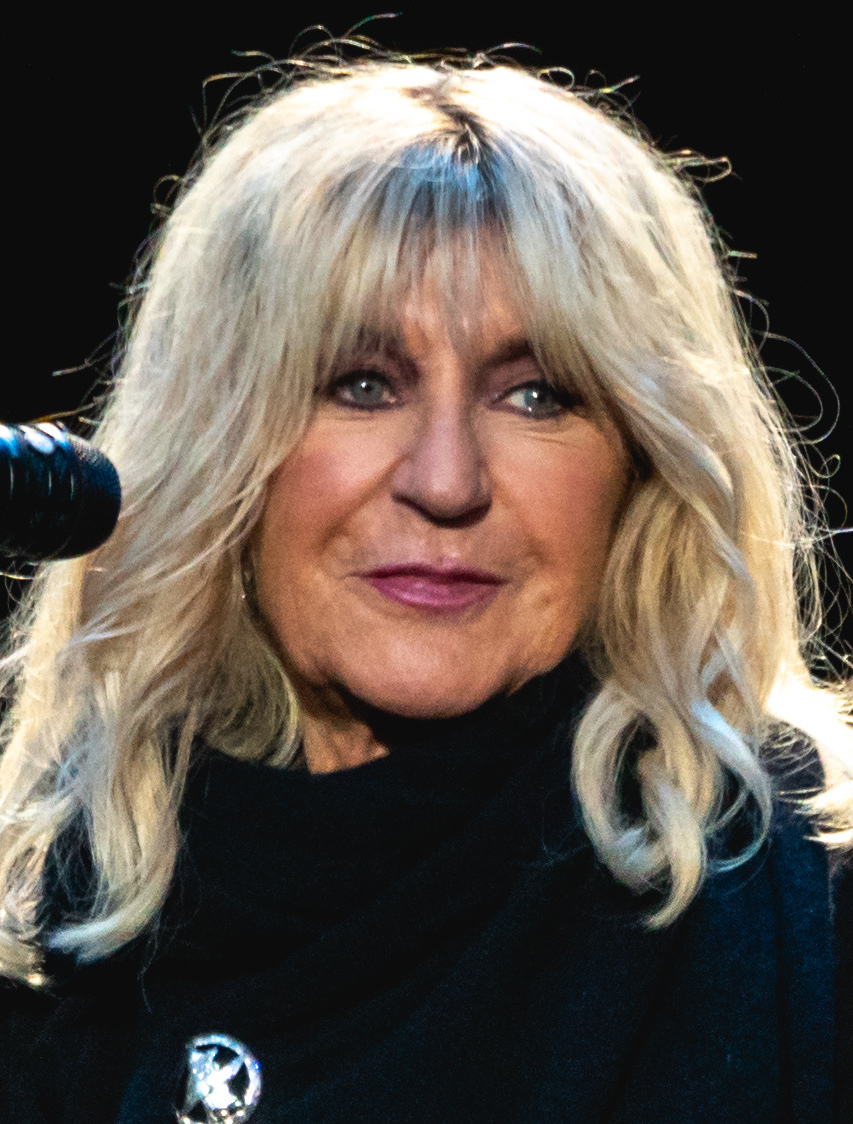
Christine McVie of Fleetwood Mac reached number one for two non-consecutive weeks with her solo hit "Got a Hold on Me".

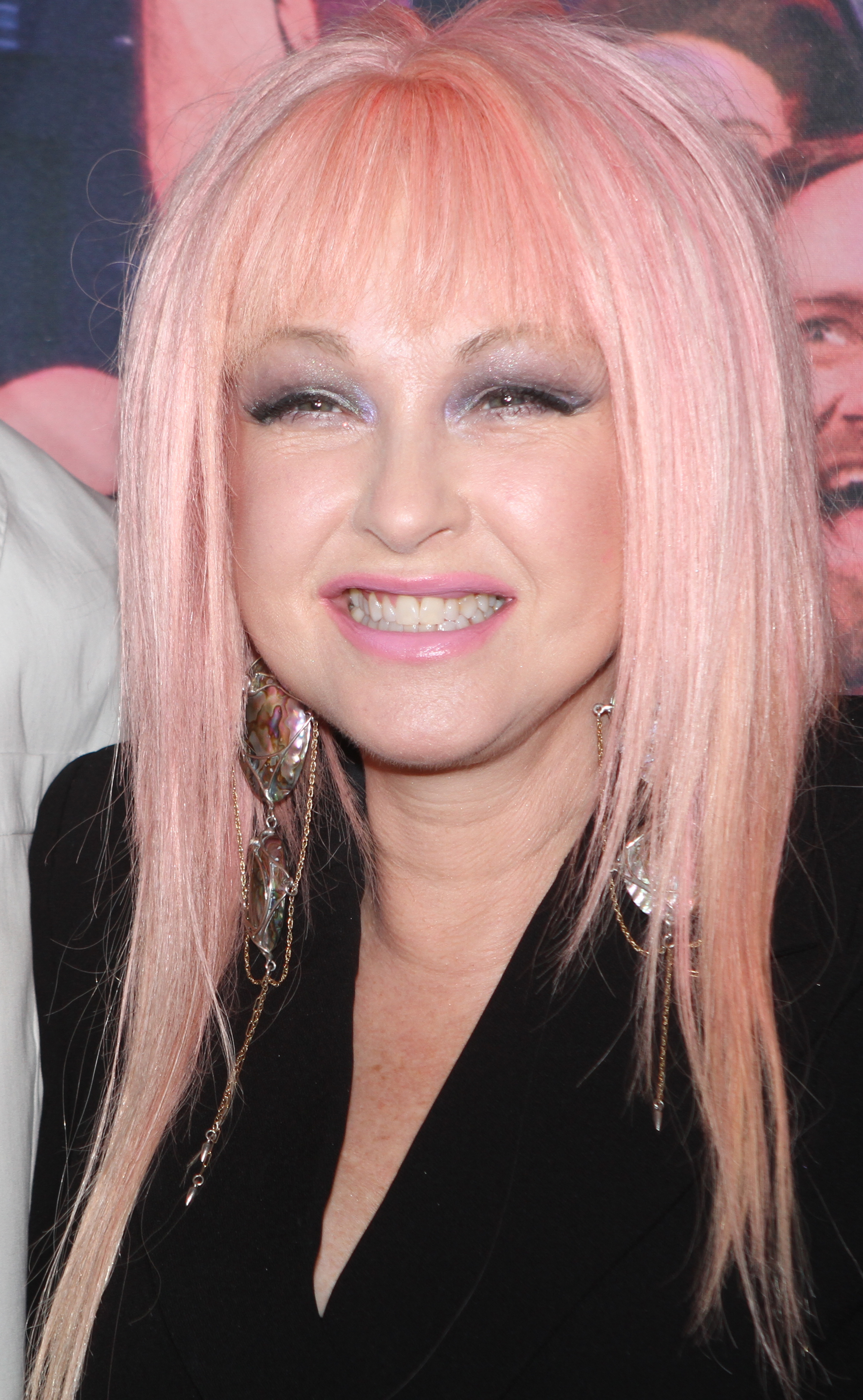
Cyndi Lauper had two Canadian AC chart number-ones in 1984 with "Time After Time" and "All Through the Night".

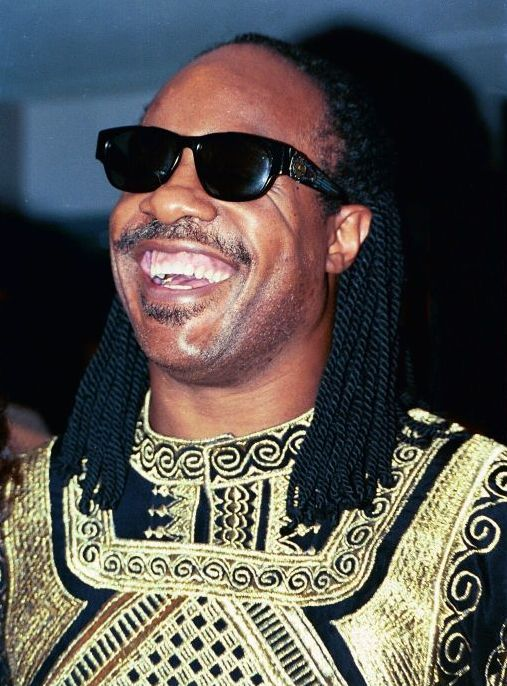
American singer Stevie Wonder spent three weeks at number one in the chart with "I Just Called to Say I Love You".

Chart history
Issue date	Title	Artist(s)	Ref.
January 7 (Note: Due to a week's break in publication for the 1983/1984 New Year period, the week of January 7 is inferred.)	"What's New"	Linda Ronstadt	
January 14	"Read 'Em and Weep"	Barry Manilow	
January 21	"Running with the Night"	Lionel Richie	
January 28	"Read 'Em and Weep"	Barry Manilow	
February 4	"I Guess That's Why They Call It the Blues"	Elton John	
February 11	"Almost Over You"	Sheena Easton	
February 18	"Think of Laura"	Christopher Cross	
February 25	"An Innocent Man"	Billy Joel	
March 3	"Take a Chance"	Olivia Newton-John and John Travolta	
March 10	"Joanna"	Kool & the Gang	
March 17	"This Woman"	Kenny Rogers	
March 24	"This Woman"	Kenny Rogers	
March 31	"Got a Hold on Me"	Christine McVie	
April 7	"You're Looking Like Love To Me"	Peabo Bryson and Roberta Flack	
April 14	"I've Got a Crush on You"	Linda Ronstadt	
April 21	"Got a Hold on Me"	Christine McVie	
April 28	"Hello"	Lionel Richie	
May 5	"Hello"	Lionel Richie	
May 12	"To All the Girls I've Loved Before"	Julio Iglesias and Willie Nelson	
May 19	"Against All Odds (Take a Look at Me Now)"	Phil Collins	
May 26	"The Longest Time"	Billy Joel	
June 2	"Don't Answer Me"	The Alan Parsons Project	
June 9	"Time After Time"	Cyndi Lauper	
June 16	"Let's Hear It for the Boy"	Deniece Williams	
June 23	"Believe in Me"	Dan Fogelberg	
June 30	"Jump (For My Love)"	The Pointer Sisters	
July 7	"Jump (For My Love)"	The Pointer Sisters	
July 14	"Just Another Woman in Love"	Anne Murray	
July 21	"Self Control"	Laura Branigan	
July 28	"If Ever You're in My Arms Again"	Peabo Bryson	
August 4 (Note: Due to a three-week break in publication for the chart's relaunch as Adult Contemporary, August 4, 11 and 18 are inferred.)	"If Ever You're in My Arms Again"	Peabo Bryson	
August 11	"If Ever You're in My Arms Again"	Peabo Bryson	
August 18	"If Ever You're in My Arms Again"	Peabo Bryson	
August 25	"Stuck on You"	Lionel Richie	
September 1	"Stuck on You"	Lionel Richie	
September 8	"Sad Songs (Say So Much)"	Elton John	
September 15	"All of You"	Julio Iglesias and Diana Ross	
September 22	"All of You"	Julio Iglesias and Diana Ross	
September 29	"Leave a Tender Moment Alone"	Billy Joel	
October 6	"I Just Called to Say I Love You"	Stevie Wonder	
October 13	"I Just Called to Say I Love You"	Stevie Wonder	
October 20	"I Just Called to Say I Love You"	Stevie Wonder	
October 27	"Drive"	The Cars	
November 3	"Hard Habit to Break"	Chicago	
November 10	"Nobody Loves Me Like You Do"	Anne Murray and Dave Loggins	
November 17	"What About Me?"	Kenny Rogers	
November 24	"What About Me?"	Kenny Rogers	
December 1	"Penny Lover"	Lionel Richie	
December 8	"Penny Lover"	Lionel Richie	
December 15	"Wake Me Up Before You Go-Go"	Wham!	
December 22	"All Through the Night"	Cyndi Lauper	
December 29 (Note: Due to a week's break in publication for the 1984 Christmas period, the week of December 29 is inferred.)	"All Through the Night"	Cyndi Lauper	
