= List of number-one singles of 2002 (Canada) =

The following lists the number one best-selling singles in Canada in 2002 which was published in Billboard magazine under the Hits of the World section. Only songs released as physical singles qualified for this chart during this time. During this period, the singles market in Canada was very limited in both scope and availability, and in many cases, these songs received little or no radio support. For tracks other than those by American Idol or Canadian Idol winners, sales were likely to be less than 1,000 per week. Nevertheless, this was the only singles chart Canadians had until June 2007, when the Canadian Hot 100 was released to the public. It also lists other big hits in the sales chart.

Note that Billboard publishes charts with an issue date approximately 7–10 days in advance.

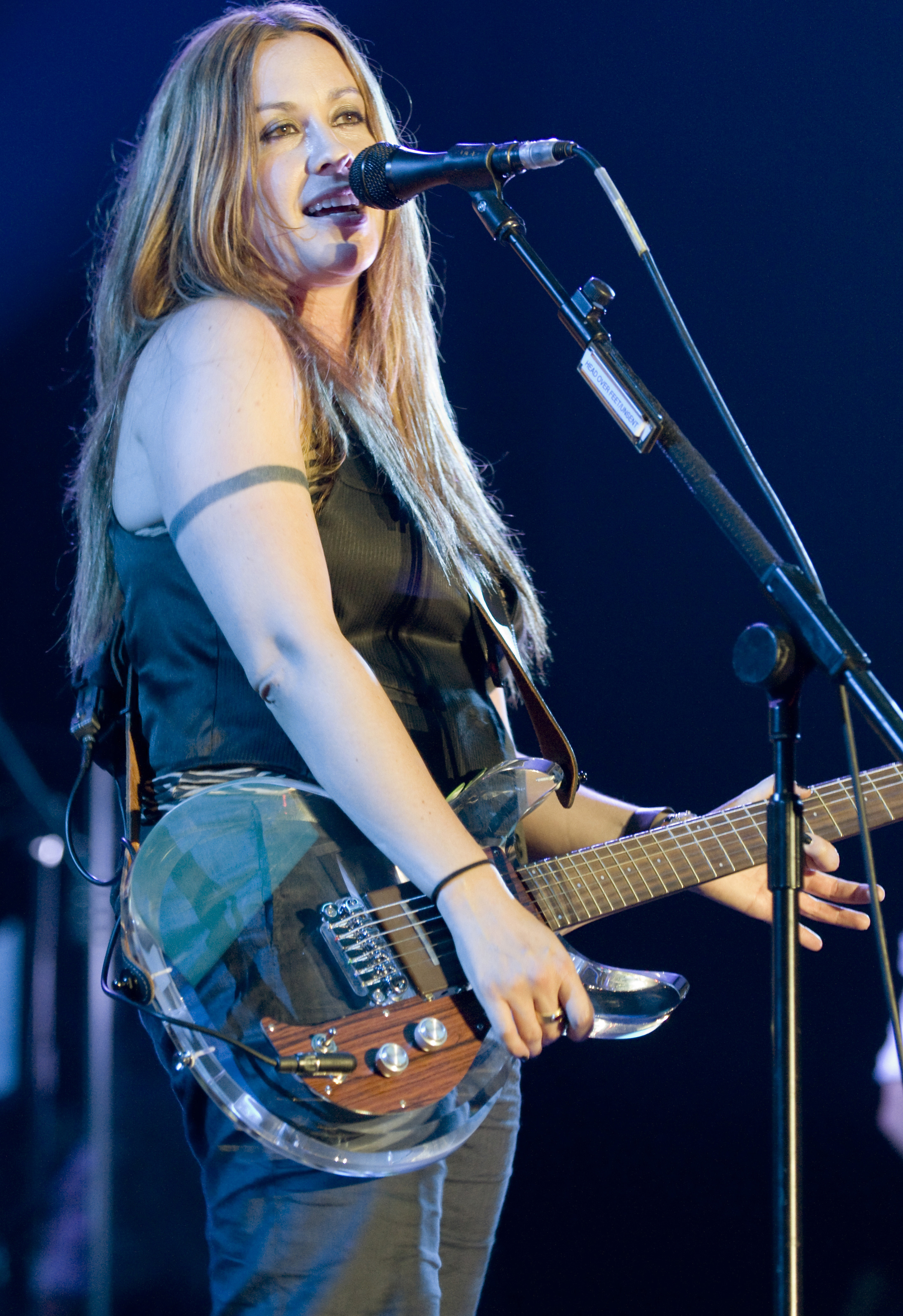
In 2002, Canadian musician Alanis Morissette released "Hands Clean" and achieved her first number-one hit since "Thank U" in 1998.

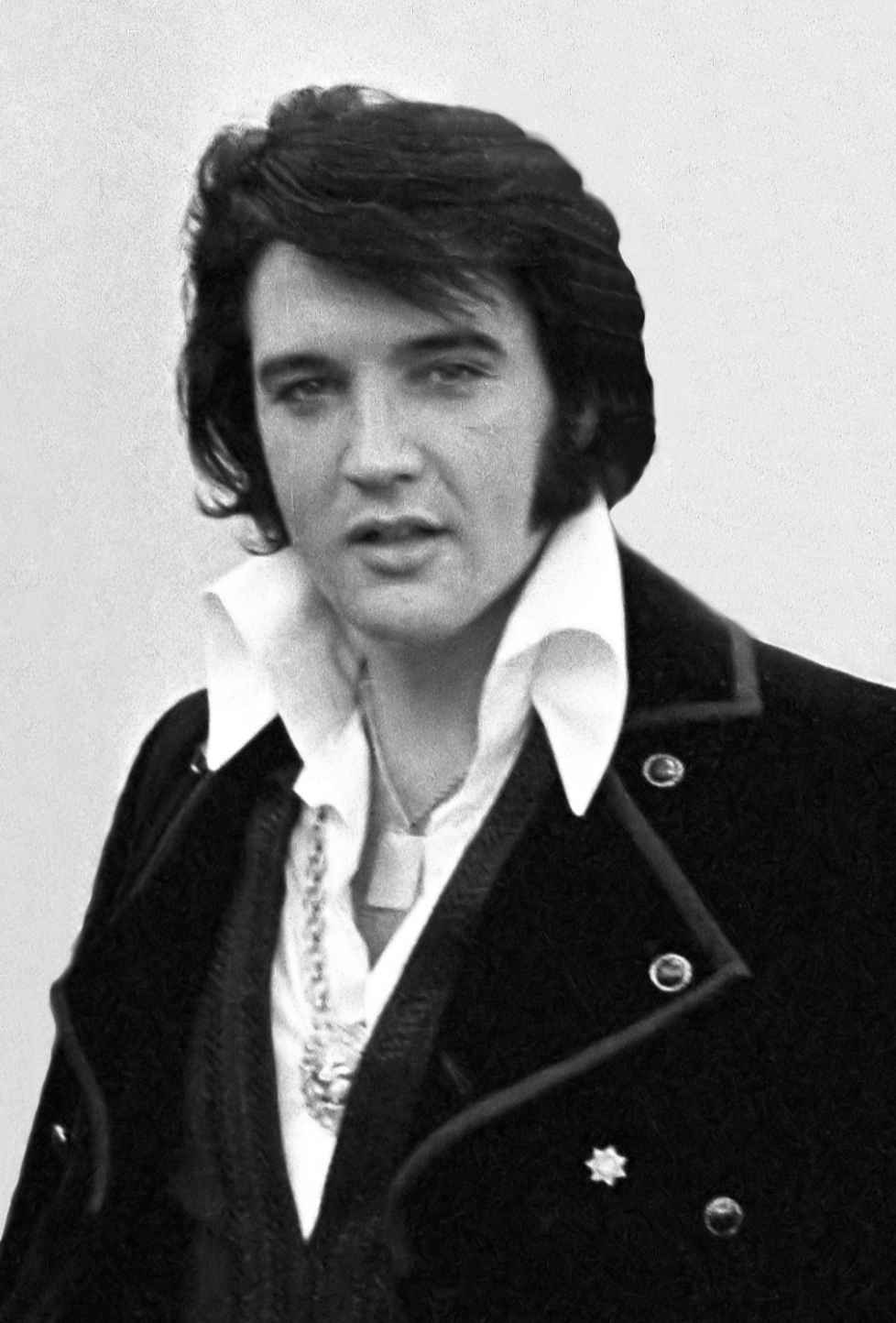
Elvis Presley and JXL had the longest number one with "A Little Less Conversation", topping the chart in July and staying there for 10 weeks.

== Chart history ==
Issue date	Song	Artist(s)	Ref.
January 5	"I Won't Be Home for Christmas"	Blink-182	
January 12	"I Won't Be Home for Christmas"	Blink-182	
January 19	"Candle in the Wind 1997" / "Something About the Way You Look Tonight"	Elton John	
January 26	"Only Time"	Enya	
February 2	"My Sweet Lord"	George Harrison	
February 9	"My Sweet Lord"	George Harrison	
February 16	"My Sweet Lord"	George Harrison	
February 23	"My Sweet Lord"	George Harrison	
March 2	"Hands Clean"	Alanis Morissette	
March 9	"Hands Clean"	Alanis Morissette	
March 16	"Hands Clean"	Alanis Morissette	
March 23	"Canadian Man: Hockey"	Paul Brandt	
March 30	"Canadian Man: Hockey"	Paul Brandt	
April 6	"Movin' On"	Boomtang	
April 13	"Movin' On"	Boomtang	
April 20	"Movin' On"	Boomtang	
April 27	"Girlfriend"	'N Sync featuring Nelly	
May 4	"The Hindu Times"	Oasis	
May 11	"The Hindu Times"	Oasis	
May 18	"Hero"	Chad Kroeger featuring Josey Scott	
May 25	"Hero"	Chad Kroeger featuring Josey Scott	
June 1	"Hero"	Chad Kroeger featuring Josey Scott	
June 8	"Hero"	Chad Kroeger featuring Josey Scott	
June 15	"Hero"	Chad Kroeger featuring Josey Scott	
June 22	"Hot in Herre"	Nelly	
June 29	"Hot in Herre"	Nelly	
July 6	"Hot in Herre"	Nelly	
July 13	"A Little Less Conversation"	Elvis Presley vs. JXL	
July 20	"A Little Less Conversation"	Elvis Presley vs. JXL	
July 27	"A Little Less Conversation"	Elvis Presley vs. JXL	
August 3	"A Little Less Conversation"	Elvis Presley vs. JXL	
August 10	"A Little Less Conversation"	Elvis Presley vs. JXL	
August 17	"A Little Less Conversation"	Elvis Presley vs. JXL	
August 24	"A Little Less Conversation"	Elvis Presley vs. JXL	
August 31	"A Little Less Conversation"	Elvis Presley vs. JXL	
September 7	"A Little Less Conversation"	Elvis Presley vs. JXL	
September 14	"A Little Less Conversation"	Elvis Presley vs. JXL	
September 21	"Everyday"	Bon Jovi	
September 28	"Get Ready"	Shawn Desman	
October 5	"A Moment Like This"	Kelly Clarkson	
October 12	"A Moment Like This"	Kelly Clarkson	
October 19	"A Moment Like This"	Kelly Clarkson	
October 26	"A Moment Like This"	Kelly Clarkson	
November 2	"A Moment Like This"	Kelly Clarkson	
November 9	"Electrical Storm" (import)	U2	
November 16	"Electrical Storm" (import)	U2	
November 23	"Die Another Day"	Madonna	
November 30	"Die Another Day"	Madonna	
December 7	"Die Another Day"	Madonna	
December 14	"Die Another Day"	Madonna	
December 21	"Die Another Day"	Madonna	
December 28	"Die Another Day"	Madonna	
