= List of number-one singles of 1964 (Canada) =

This is a list of the weekly Canadian number one singles of 1964. Prior to June 1964, the primary national pop chart was the CHUM Chart, from Top 40 radio station CHUM in Toronto, Ontario; in June, the new magazine RPM was launched as a national record chart compiling results from individual stations across Canada including CHUM.

== CHUM Chart ==
Issue date	Single	Artist	Reference
6 January	"Louie Louie"	The Kingsmen	
13 January	"Louie Louie"	The Kingsmen	
20 January	"She Loves You"	The Beatles	
27 January	"She Loves You"	The Beatles	
3 February	"She Loves You"	The Beatles	
10 February	"I Want to Hold Your Hand" / "I Saw Her Standing There"	The Beatles	
17 February	"I Want to Hold Your Hand" / "I Saw Her Standing There"	The Beatles	
24 February	"I Want to Hold Your Hand" / "I Saw Her Standing There"	The Beatles	
2 March	"I Want to Hold Your Hand" / "I Saw Her Standing There"	The Beatles	
9 March	"I Want to Hold Your Hand" / "I Saw Her Standing There"	The Beatles	
16 March	"I Want to Hold Your Hand" / "I Saw Her Standing There"	The Beatles	
23 March	"All My Loving" / "This Boy"	The Beatles	
30 March	"All My Loving" / "This Boy"	The Beatles	
6 April	"All My Loving" / "This Boy"	The Beatles	
13 April	"All My Loving" / "This Boy"	The Beatles	
20 April	"All My Loving" / "This Boy"	The Beatles	
27 April	"Bits and Pieces"	The Dave Clark Five	
4 May	"Bits and Pieces"	The Dave Clark Five	
11 May	"Bits and Pieces"	The Dave Clark Five	
18 May	"Bits and Pieces"	The Dave Clark Five	
25 May	"I'm the One"	Gerry and the Pacemakers	
1 June	"I'm the One"	Gerry and the Pacemakers	
8 June	"A World Without Love"	Peter and Gordon	
15 June	"A World Without Love"	Peter and Gordon	
22 June	"A World Without Love"	Peter and Gordon	

== RPM ==
Issue dates	Single	Artist	Reference
22 June	"Chapel of Love"	The Dixie Cups	
29 June	"I Get Around"	The Beach Boys	
6 July	"Memphis"	Johnny Rivers	
13 July	"Rag Doll"	The Four Seasons	
20 July	"Rag Doll"	The Four Seasons	
27 July	"Rag Doll"	The Four Seasons	
4 August	"Rag Doll"	The Four Seasons	
11 August	"The Little Old Lady (from Pasadena)"	Jan and Dean	
17 August	"A Hard Day's Night"	The Beatles	
1 September	"Where Did Our Love Go"	The Supremes	
8 September	"The House of the Rising Sun"	The Animals	
14 September	"Bread and Butter"	The Newbeats	
21 September	"Save It for Me"	The Four Seasons	
28 September	"Oh, Pretty Woman"	Roy Orbison	
5 October	"Do Wah Diddy Diddy"	Manfred Mann	
12 October	"Do Wah Diddy Diddy"	Manfred Mann	
19 October	"When I Grow Up (To Be a Man)"	The Beach Boys	
26 October	"When I Grow Up (To Be a Man)"	The Beach Boys	
2 November	"Have I the Right?"	The Honeycombs	
9 November	"Have I the Right?"	The Honeycombs	
16 November	"Ain't That Lovin' You, Baby"	Elvis Presley	
23 November	"Ain't That Lovin' You, Baby"	Elvis Presley	
30 November	"Come a Little Bit Closer"	Jay and the Americans	
7 December	"Ringo"	Lorne Greene	
14 December	"Mr. Lonely"	Bobby Vinton	
21 December	"(There's) Always Something There to Remind Me"	Sandie Shaw	
28 December	"I Feel Fine"	The Beatles	

== See also ==
- 1964 in Canadian music
