= List of number-one singles of 1961 (Canada) =

The following is a list of the CHUM Chart number-one singles of 1961.

Issue date	Song	Artist	Reference
January 2	"Wonderland by Night"	Bert Kaempfert	
January 9	"Wonderland by Night"	Bert Kaempfert	
January 16	"Wonderland by Night"	Bert Kaempfert	
January 23	"Calendar Girl"	Neil Sedaka	
January 30	"Calendar Girl"	Neil Sedaka	
February 6	"Calendar Girl"	Neil Sedaka	
February 13	"A Scottish Soldier"	Andy Stewart	
February 20	"A Scottish Soldier"	Andy Stewart	
February 27	"A Scottish Soldier"	Andy Stewart	
March 6	"Donald Where's Your Troosers?"	Andy Stewart	
March 13	"Apache"	Jørgen Ingmann	
March 20	"Apache"	Jørgen Ingmann	
March 27	"Surrender"	Elvis Presley	
April 3	"Blue Moon"	The Marcels	
April 10	"Blue Moon"	The Marcels	
April 17	"Runaway"	Del Shannon	
April 24	"Runaway"	Del Shannon	
May 1	"Runaway"	Del Shannon	
May 8	"Runaway"	Del Shannon	
May 15	"Hello Mary Lou" / "Travelin' Man"	Ricky Nelson	
May 22	"Hello Mary Lou" / "Travelin' Man"	Ricky Nelson	
May 29	"Running Scared"	Roy Orbison	
June 5	"Hello Mary Lou" / "Travelin' Man"	Ricky Nelson	
June 12	"Hello Mary Lou" / "Travelin' Man"	Ricky Nelson	
June 19	"Moody River"	Pat Boone	
June 26	"Moody River"	Pat Boone	
July 3	"Quarter to Three"	U.S Bonds	
July 10	"Hats Off to Larry"	Del Shannon	
July 17	"I'm Gonna Knock on Your Door"	Eddie Hodges	
July 24	"I'm Gonna Knock on Your Door"	Eddie Hodges	
July 31	"I'm Gonna Knock on Your Door"	Eddie Hodges	
August 7	"I'm Gonna Knock on Your Door"	Eddie Hodges	
August 14	"Who Put the Bomp (in the Bomp, Bomp, Bomp)"	Barry Mann	
August 21	"Who Put the Bomp (in the Bomp, Bomp, Bomp)"	Barry Mann	
August 28	"Who Put the Bomp (in the Bomp, Bomp, Bomp)"	Barry Mann	
September 4	"Johnny Willow"	Fred Darian	
September 11	"(Marie's the Name) His Latest Flame"	Elvis Presley	
September 18	"Take Good Care of My Baby"	Bobby Vee	
September 25	"Take Good Care of My Baby"	Bobby Vee	
October 2	"Take Good Care of My Baby"	Bobby Vee	
October 9	"Big Bad John"	Jimmy Dean	
October 16	"You're the Reason"	Bobby Edwards	
October 23	"You're the Reason"	Bobby Edwards	
October 30	"Runaround Sue"	Dion	
November 6	"Runaround Sue"	Dion	
November 13	"Runaround Sue"	Dion	
November 20	"Walk On By"	Leroy Van Dyke	
November 27	"Walk On By"	Leroy Van Dyke	
December 4	"Goodbye Cruel World"	James Darren	
December 11	"The Lion Sleeps Tonight"	The Tokens	
December 18	"The Lion Sleeps Tonight"	The Tokens	
December 25	"The Lion Sleeps Tonight"	The Tokens	

== See also ==
- 1961 in music
