= List of number-one singles of 1998 (Canada) =

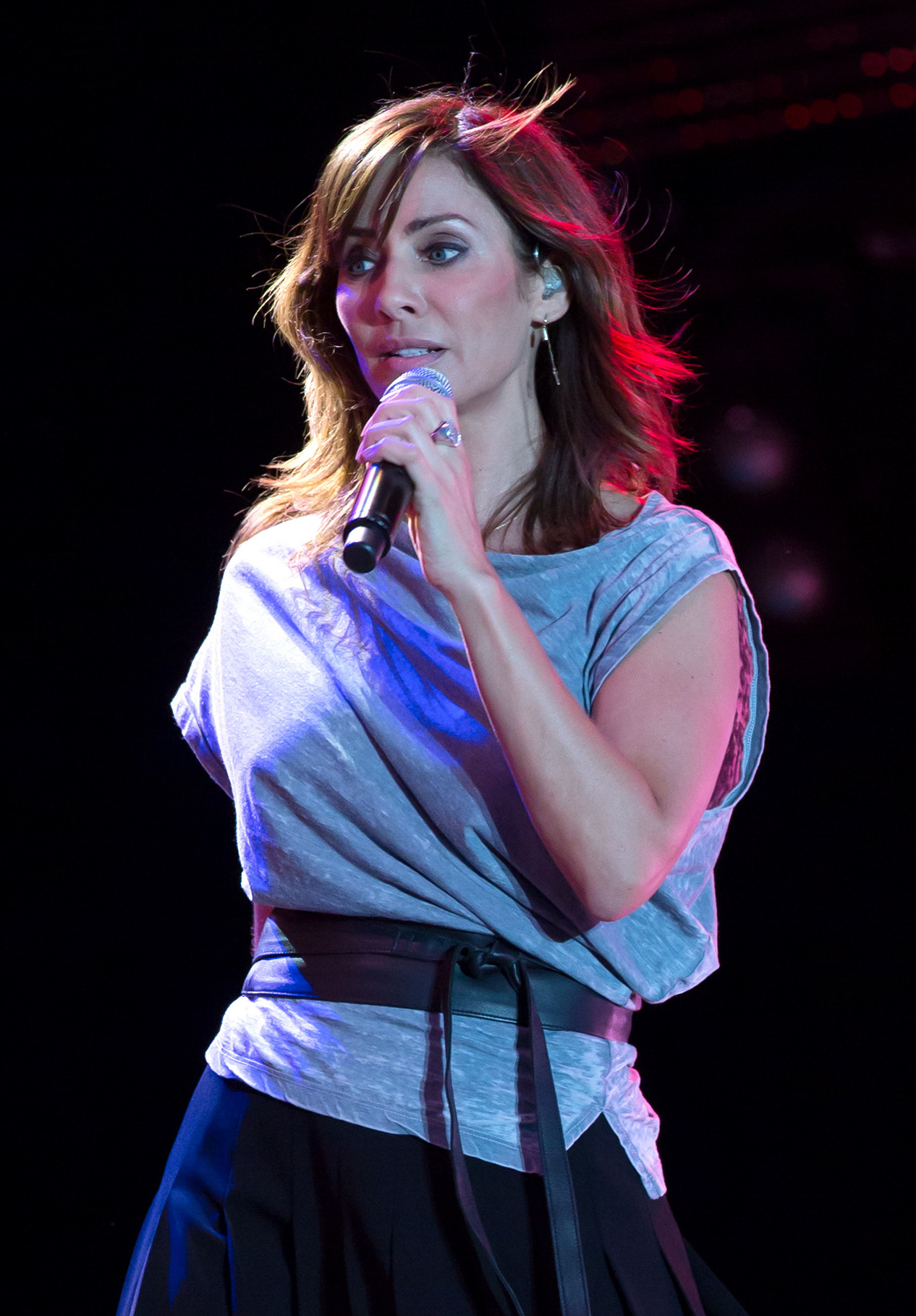
Australian singer Natalie Imbruglia spent 12 weeks at number one with "Torn", Canada's best-performing single of 1998.

RPM was a Canadian magazine that published the best-performing singles of Canada from 1964 to 2000. In 1998, fifteen songs peaked at number one on the magazine's chart. Chumbawamba's "Tubthumping" was the first chart-topper of the year while Canadian musician Alanis Morissette stayed at number one into 1999 with "Thank U". Seven musical acts attained their first Canadian number one this year: Matchbox Twenty, Natalie Imbruglia, Fastball, Goo Goo Dolls, Brandy, Monica, and Jennifer Paige. Two artists reached number one with more than one single: Bryan Adams and Goo Goo Dolls.

The most successful song of the year, as well as the longest-running number-one hit, was "Torn" by Australian singer Natalie Imbruglia, which spent 12 nonconsecutive weeks at number one from April to July, interrupted on the week of 15 June by Fastball's "The Way". Two other songs also interrupted a single's reign at number one: "3 AM" by Matchbox Twenty kept Bryan Adams' "Back to You" off number one for two weeks, and "Iris" by Goo Goo Dolls lost the number-one position on the issue of 17 August to Brandy and Monica's "The Boy Is Mine".

Three Canadian artists reached number one during 1998: Bryan Adams, Celine Dion, and Alanis Morissette. Dion topped the chart for six weeks with "My Heart Will Go On". Besides "Torn" and "My Heart Will Go On", five songs stayed at the summit for at least three weeks: "Back to You" by Bryan Adams, "Iris" by Goo Goo Dolls, "Crush" by Jennifer Paige, "Sweetest Thing" by U2, and "Thank U" by Alanis Morissette. Goo Goo Dolls' "Slide" became only the third single to debut at number one on the RPM Singles Chart, not counting the magazine's first issue.

Key
† Indicates best-performing single of 1998

== Chart history ==
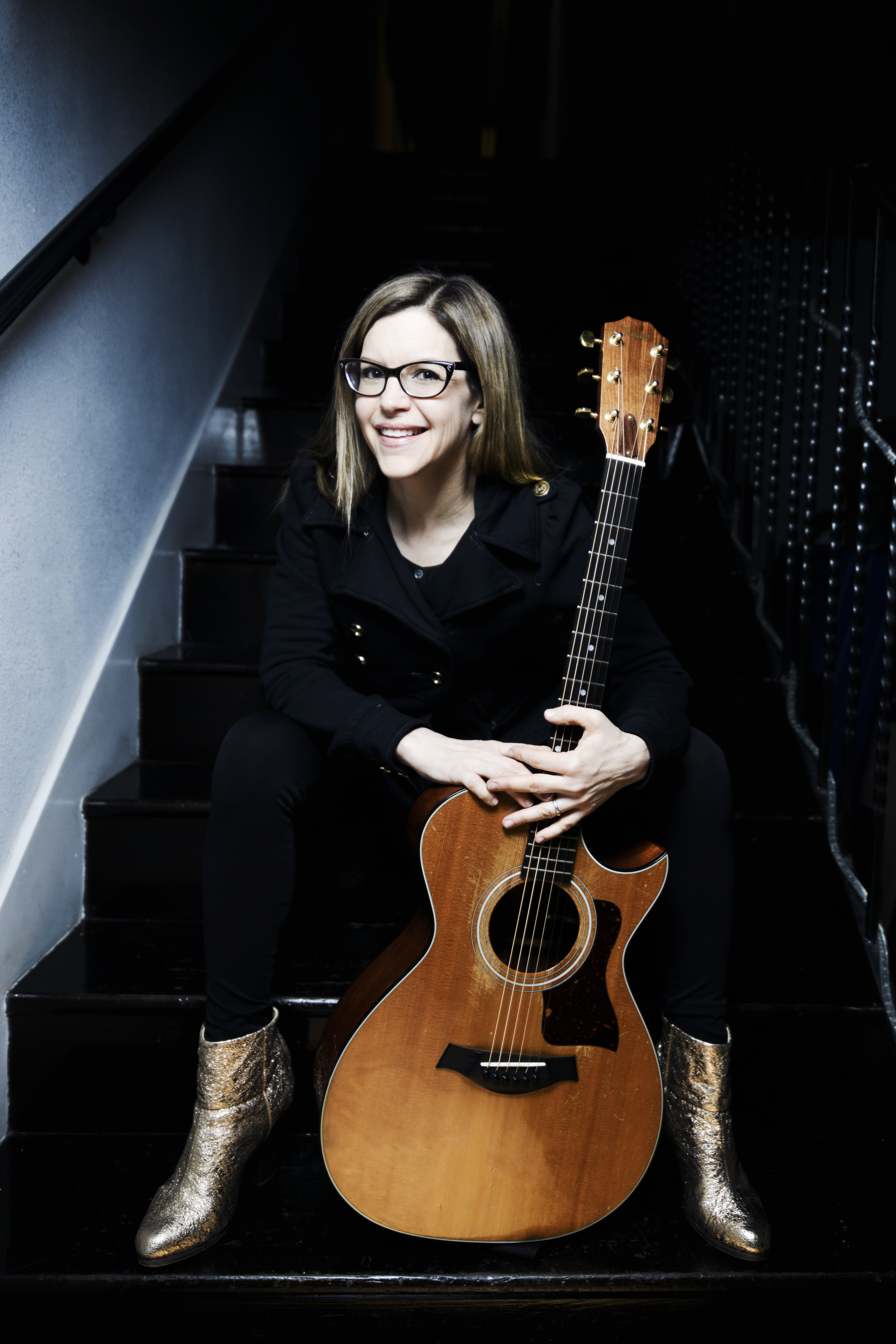
Lisa Loeb's "I Do" became her second Canadian number-one hit.

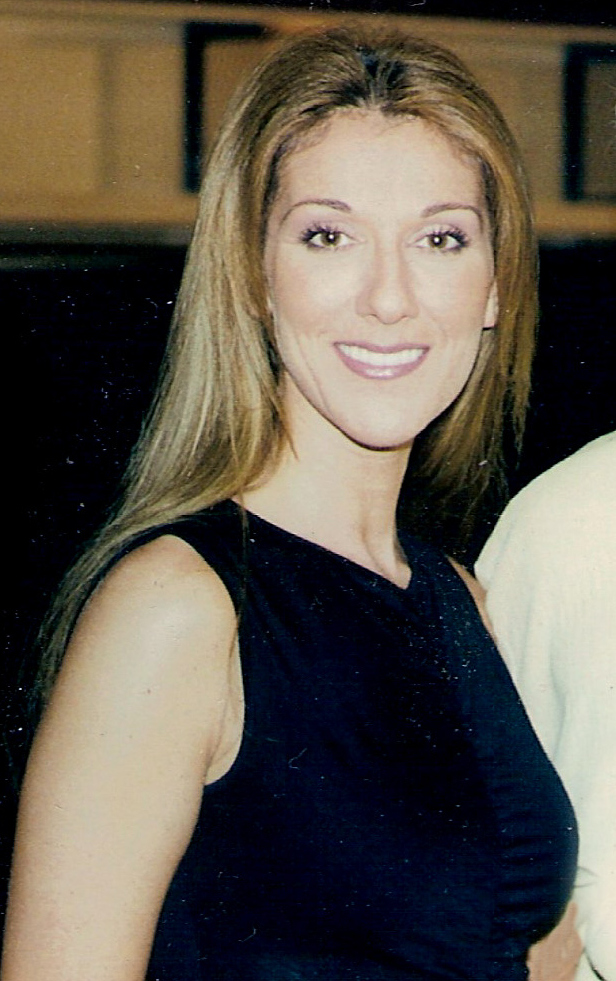
Celine Dion remained at number one in her native country for six weeks with her theme from the 1997 film Titanic, "My Heart Will Go On".

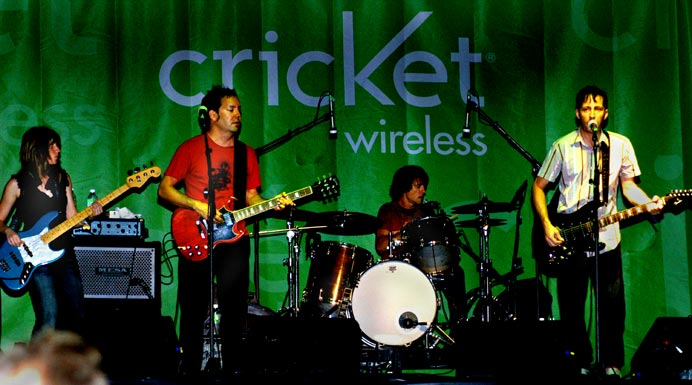
"The Way" by Fastball rose to number one in mid-June for a single issue.

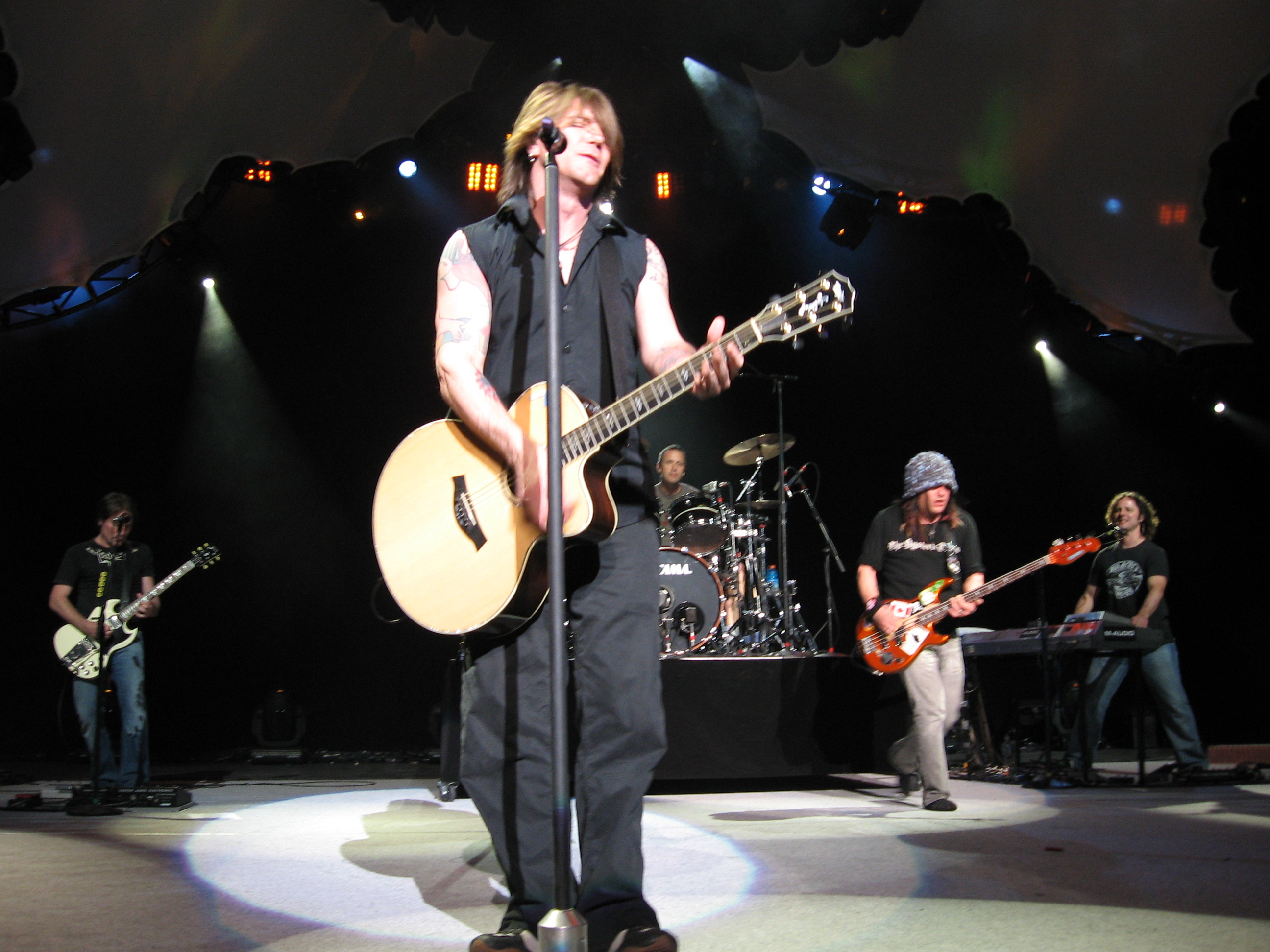
American rock band Goo Goo Dolls released two number-one singles in 1998: "Iris" and "Slide", giving the band 10 weeks at number one.

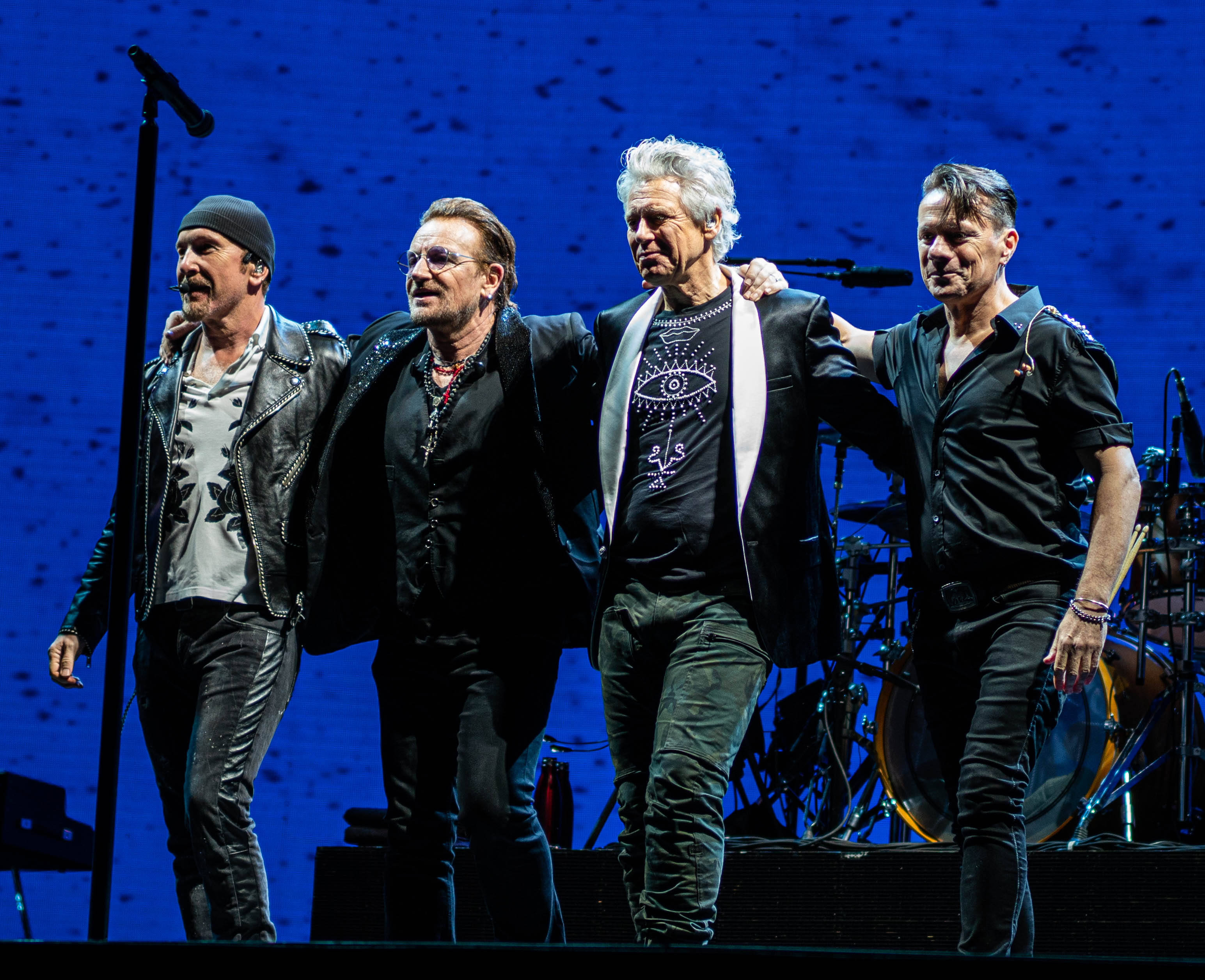
U2 achieved their seventh Canadian number-one hit in 1998 with "Sweetest Thing", a three-week chart-topper.

Issue date	Song	Artist	Reference
5 January (Note: Due to a three-week break in publication over the 1997/1998 Christmas/New Year period, the week of 5 January is inferred.)	"Tubthumping"	Chumbawamba	
12 January	"I Do"	Lisa Loeb	
19 January	"Back to You"	Bryan Adams	
26 January	"3 AM"	Matchbox Twenty	
2 February	"3 AM"	Matchbox Twenty	
9 February	"Back to You"	Bryan Adams	
16 February	"Back to You"	Bryan Adams	
23 February	"Truly Madly Deeply"	Savage Garden	
2 March	"My Heart Will Go On"	Celine Dion	
9 March	"My Heart Will Go On"	Celine Dion	
16 March	"My Heart Will Go On"	Celine Dion	
23 March	"My Heart Will Go On"	Celine Dion	
30 March	"My Heart Will Go On"	Celine Dion	
6 April	"My Heart Will Go On"	Celine Dion	
13 April	"Torn"†	Natalie Imbruglia	
20 April	"Torn"†	Natalie Imbruglia	
27 April	"Torn"†	Natalie Imbruglia	
4 May	"Torn"†	Natalie Imbruglia	
11 May	"Torn"†	Natalie Imbruglia	
18 May	"Torn"†	Natalie Imbruglia	
25 May	"Torn"†	Natalie Imbruglia	
1 June	"Torn"†	Natalie Imbruglia	
8 June	"Torn"†	Natalie Imbruglia	
15 June	"The Way"	Fastball	
22 June	"Torn"†	Natalie Imbruglia	
29 June	"Torn"†	Natalie Imbruglia	
6 July	"Torn"†	Natalie Imbruglia	
13 July	"Iris"	Goo Goo Dolls	
20 July	"Iris"	Goo Goo Dolls	
27 July	"Iris"	Goo Goo Dolls	
3 August	"Iris"	Goo Goo Dolls	
10 August	"Iris"	Goo Goo Dolls	
17 August	"The Boy Is Mine"	Brandy and Monica	
24 August	"Iris"	Goo Goo Dolls	
31 August	"Iris"	Goo Goo Dolls	
7 September	"Iris"	Goo Goo Dolls	
14 September	"Crush"	Jennifer Paige	
21 September	"Crush"	Jennifer Paige	
28 September	"Crush"	Jennifer Paige	
5 October	"Crush"	Jennifer Paige	
12 October	"Crush"	Jennifer Paige	
19 October	"Slide"	Goo Goo Dolls	
26 October	"Slide"	Goo Goo Dolls	
2 November	"On a Day Like Today"	Bryan Adams	
9 November	"Sweetest Thing"	U2	
16 November	"Sweetest Thing"	U2	
23 November	"Sweetest Thing"	U2	
30 November	"Thank U"	Alanis Morissette	
7 December	"Thank U"	Alanis Morissette	
14 December	"Thank U"	Alanis Morissette	
21 December (Note: Due to a three-week break in publication over the 1998/1999 Christmas/New Year period, the weeks of 21 December and 28 December are inferred.)	"Thank U"	Alanis Morissette	
28 December	"Thank U"	Alanis Morissette	

== See also ==
- 1998 in music
- List of Billboard Hot 100 number ones of 1998 (United States)
- List of number-one singles from the 1990s (New Zealand)
