= List of UK Country Albums Chart number ones of 2018 =

These are the Official Charts Company's UK Country Albums Chart number ones of 2018. The chart week runs from Friday to Thursday with the chart-date given as the following Thursday. Chart positions are based the multi-metric consumption of country music in the United Kingdom, blending traditional album sales, track equivalent albums, and streaming equivalent albums. The chart contains 20 positions.

In the iteration of the chart dated 5 January, From A Room: Volume 2 by Chris Stapleton spent its third non-consecutive week at number one, but was then displaced by Glen Campbell's final album Adiós, which returned for its twenty fourth week in the top spot following his death in August 2017. Later in the year, Sings for the King, a compilation of previously unreleased demos recorded by Campbell for Elvis Presley spent three weeks at the chart peak, giving Campbell two number one albums in 2018. In March, Kelsea Ballerini's second album Unapologetically finally reached number one, nineteen weeks after debuting on the chart, and held the top spot for three weeks, before being replaced by Kacey Musgraves' critically acclaimed Golden Hour, which also spent three weeks at number one and returned to the peak twice later in the year. Accidentally on Purpose, the third studio album by British duo The Shires, was released in April and spent a leading fifteen weeks at number one, including fourteen consecutive weeks. It was ultimately displaced by Talk of This Town, the debut album by Irish singer-songwriter Catherine McGrath, which held the top spot for four weeks. Carrie Underwood's Cry Pretty also spent four consecutive weeks at number one. Other artists who spent multiple weeks at the top of the chart include The Wandering Hearts, Clare Bowen, Pistol Annies, and Ashton Lane. The final number one of the year was Musgraves' Golden Hour.

== Chart history ==
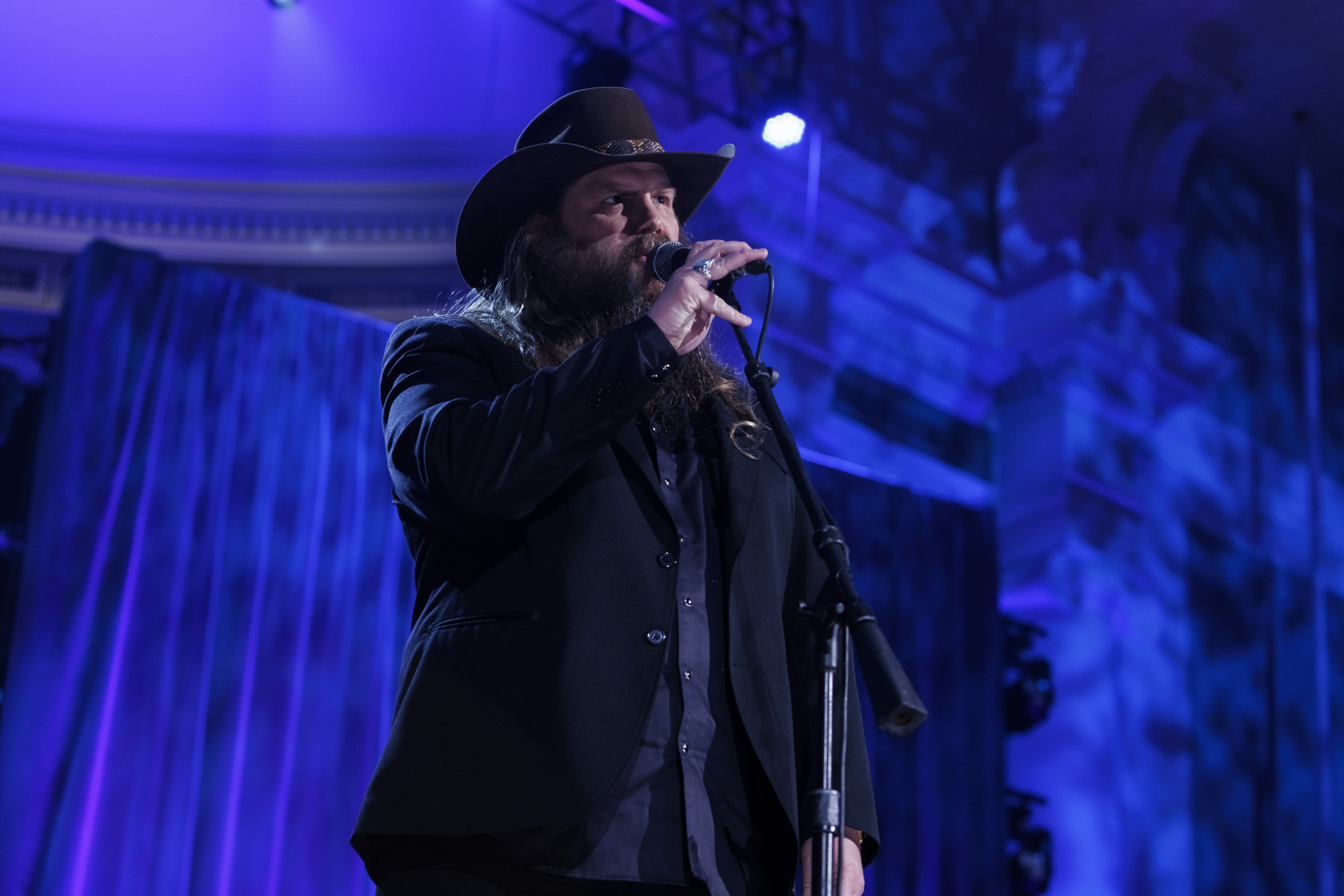
From A Room: Volume 2 by Chris Stapleton was number one for four weeks.

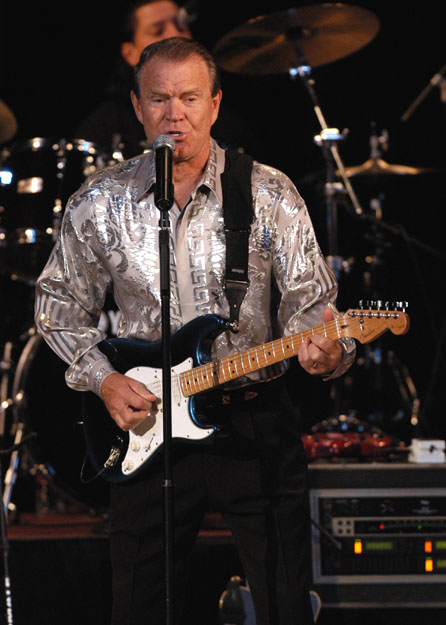
Glen Campbell reached number one with two albums in 2018: Adiós his final album, and Sings for the King, a posthumous compilation.

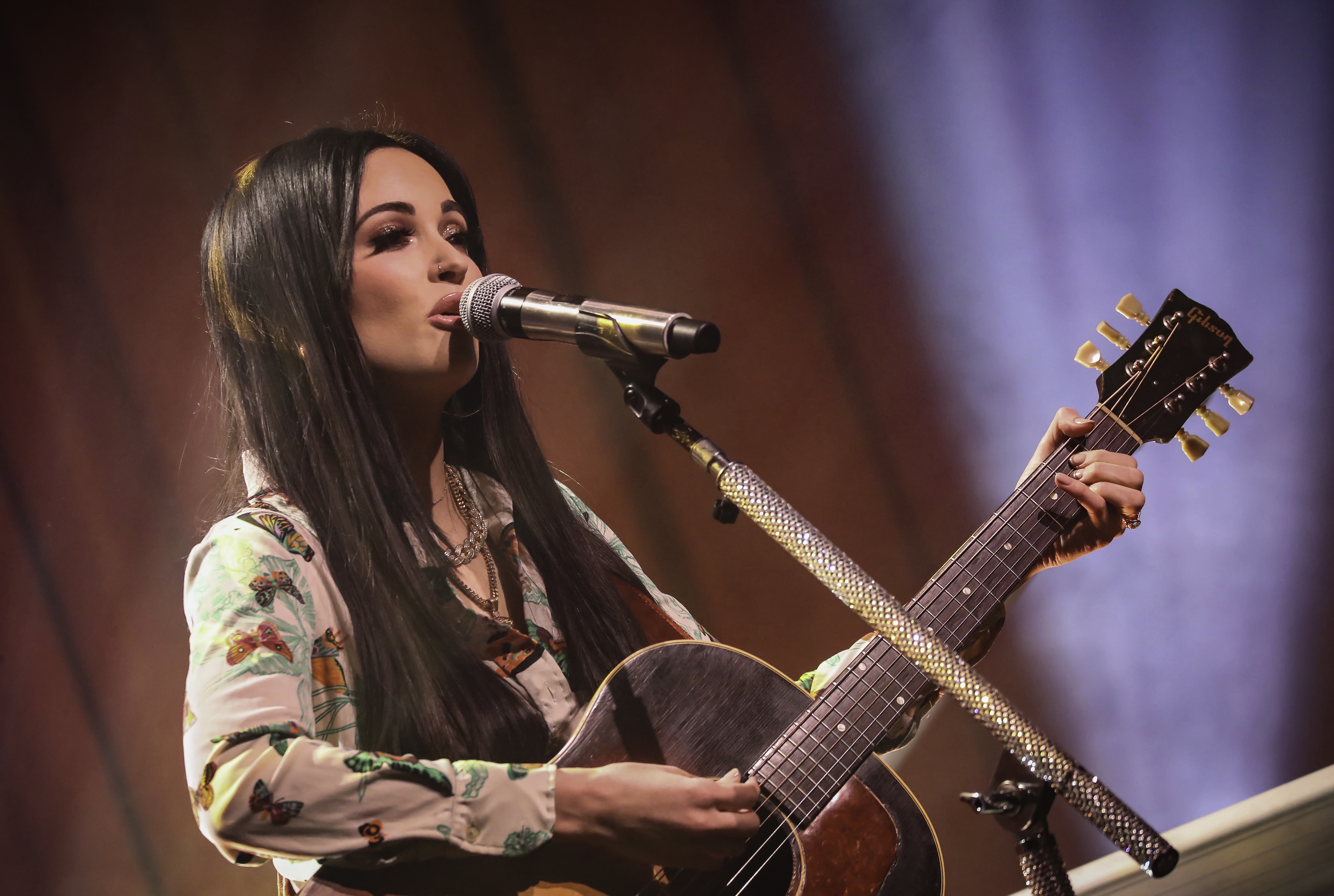
Golden Hour by Kacey Musgraves spent five weeks in the top spot.

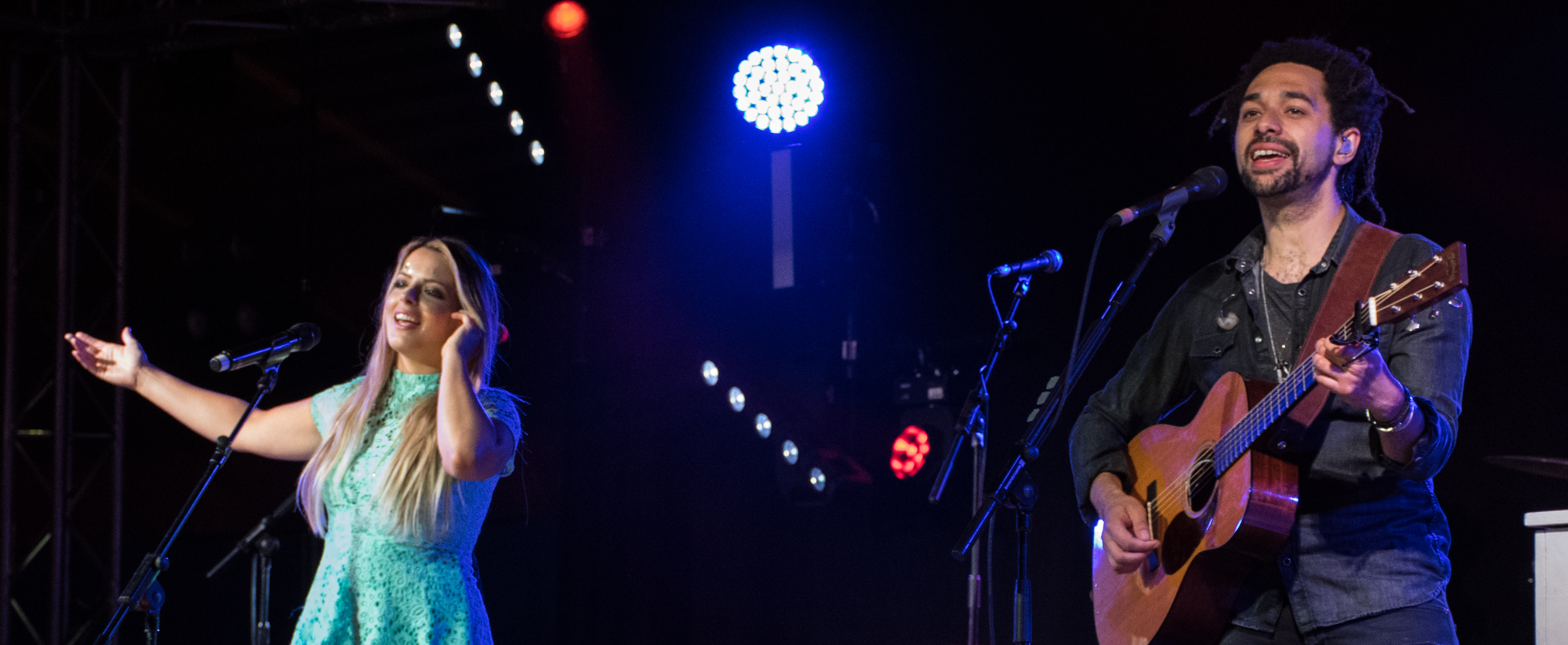
The Shires spent a leading fifteen weeks at number one with their third album Accidentally on Purpose.

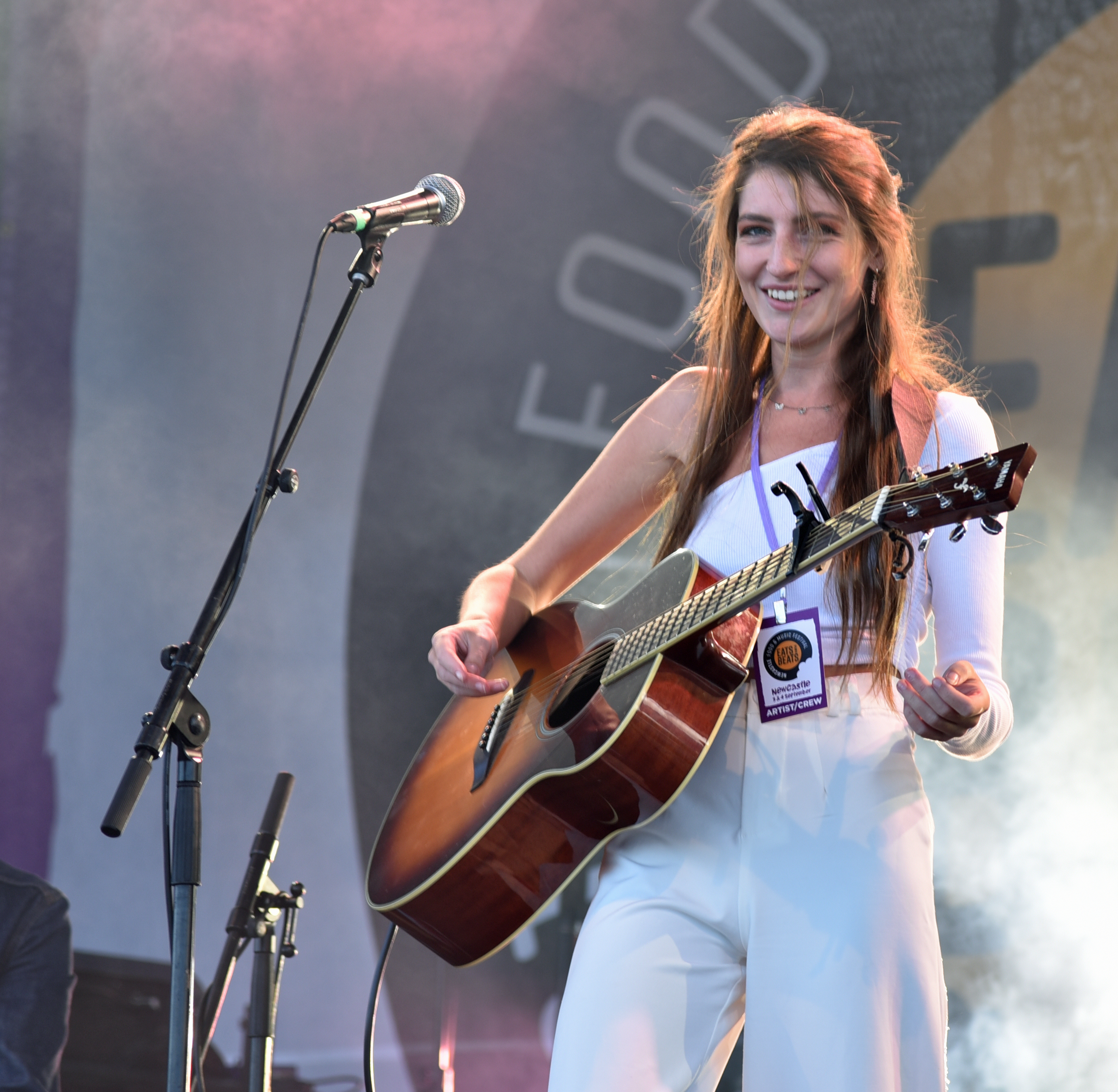
Catherine McGrath spent four consecutive weeks at number one with her debut album Talk of This Town.

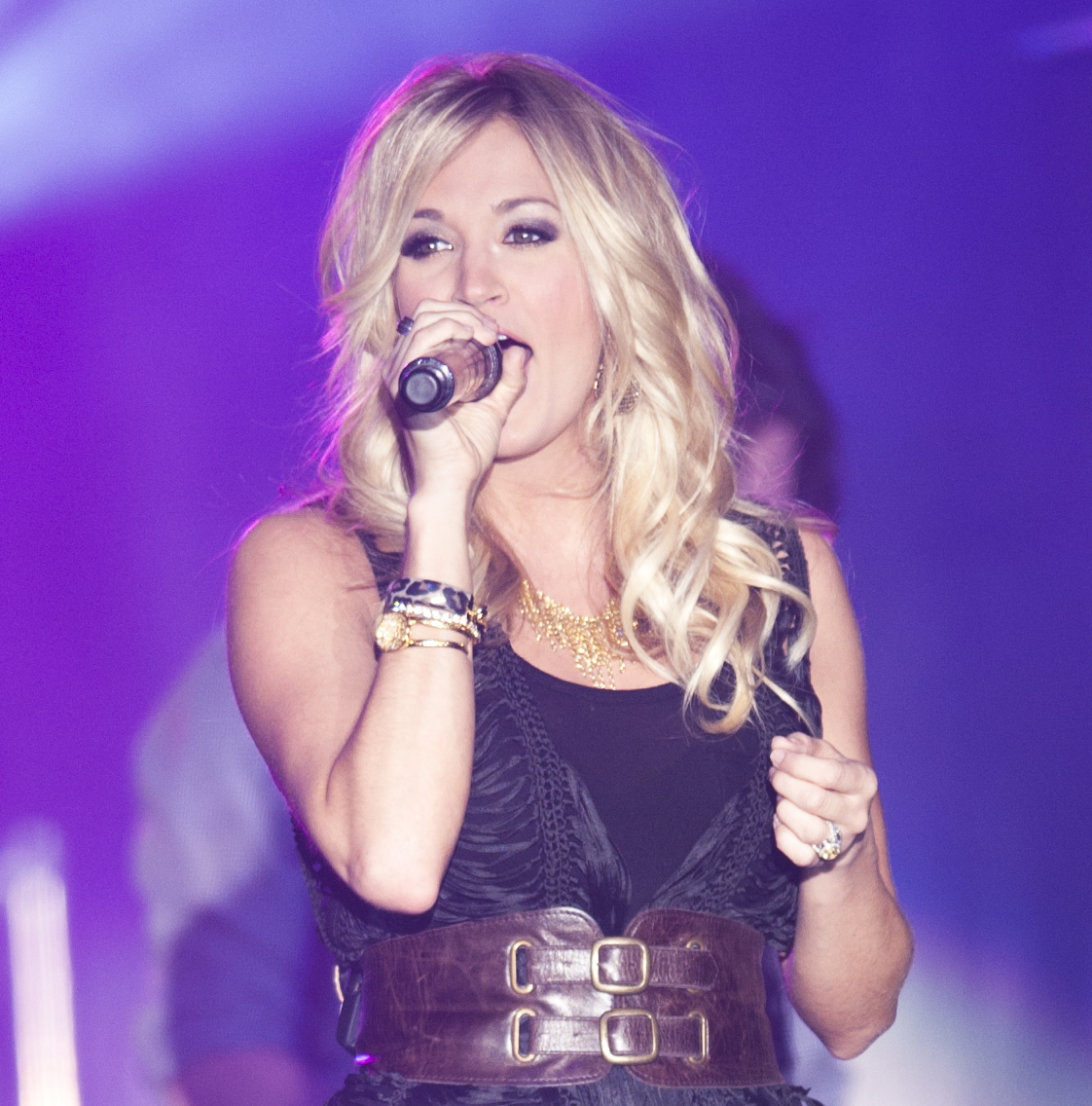
Carrie Underwood's Cry Pretty held the top spot for four weeks, and became her fourth UK number one album.

Issue date	Album	Artist(s)	Record label	Ref.
5 January	From A Room: Volume 2	Chris Stapleton	Mercury Nashville	
12 January	Adiós	Glen Campbell	UMC	
19 January	Adiós	Glen Campbell	UMC	
26 January	From A Room: Volume 2	Chris Stapleton	Mercury Nashville	
2 February	From A Room: Volume 2	Chris Stapleton	Mercury Nashville	
9 February	From A Room: Volume 2	Chris Stapleton	Mercury Nashville	
16 February	Wild Silence	The Wandering Hearts	Decca	
23 February	Wild Silence	The Wandering Hearts	Decca	
2 March	Wild Silence	The Wandering Hearts	Decca	
9 March	I'll Make the Most of My Sins	Robert Vincent	At the Helm	
16 March	Unapologetically	Kelsea Ballerini	Sony	
23 March	Unapologetically	Kelsea Ballerini	Sony	
30 March	Unapologetically	Kelsea Ballerini	Sony	
6 April	Golden Hour	Kacey Musgraves	Mercury Nashville	
13 April	Golden Hour	Kacey Musgraves	Mercury Nashville	
20 April	Golden Hour	Kacey Musgraves	Mercury Nashville	
27 April	Accidentally on Purpose	The Shires	Decca	
4 May	Accidentally on Purpose	The Shires	Decca	
11 May	Accidentally on Purpose	The Shires	Decca	
18 May	Accidentally on Purpose	The Shires	Decca	
25 May	Accidentally on Purpose	The Shires	Decca	
1 June	Accidentally on Purpose	The Shires	Decca	
8 June	Accidentally on Purpose	The Shires	Decca	
15 June	Accidentally on Purpose	The Shires	Decca	
22 June	Accidentally on Purpose	The Shires	Decca	
29 June	Accidentally on Purpose	The Shires	Decca	
6 July	Accidentally on Purpose	The Shires	Decca	
13 July	Accidentally on Purpose	The Shires	Decca	
20 July	Accidentally on Purpose	The Shires	Decca	
27 July	Accidentally on Purpose	The Shires	Decca	
3 August	Talk of This Town	Catherine McGrath	Warner Bros.	
10 August	Talk of This Town	Catherine McGrath	Warner Bros.	
17 August	Talk of This Town	Catherine McGrath	Warner Bros.	
24 August	Talk of This Town	Catherine McGrath	Warner Bros.	
31 August	Accidentally on Purpose	The Shires	Decca	
7 September	Clare Bowen	Clare Bowen	BMG	
14 September	Clare Bowen	Clare Bowen	BMG	
21 September	Cry Pretty	Carrie Underwood	EMI	
28 September	Cry Pretty	Carrie Underwood	EMI	
5 October	Cry Pretty	Carrie Underwood	EMI	
12 October	Cry Pretty	Carrie Underwood	EMI	
19 October	Desperate Man	Eric Church	Spinefarm	
26 October	Born for the Road	Nathan Carter	Sharpe Music	
2 November	Golden Hour	Kacey Musgraves	Mercury Nashville	
9 November	Interstate Gospel	Pistol Annies	Sony	
16 November	Interstate Gospel	Pistol Annies	Sony	
23 November	Sings for the King	Glen Campbell	UMC	
30 November	Sings for the King	Glen Campbell	UMC	
7 December	Sings for the King	Glen Campbell	UMC	
14 December	The In-Between	Ashton Lane	OC	
21 December	The In-Between	Ashton Lane	OC	
28 December	Golden Hour	Kacey Musgraves	Mercury Nashville	

== Most weeks at number one ==
Weeks at number one	Artist
15	The Shires
5	Glen Campbell
5	Kacey Musgraves
4	Carrie Underwood
4	Catherine McGrath
4	Chris Stapleton
3	Kelsea Ballerini
3	The Wandering Hearts
2	Ashton Lane
2	Clare Bowen
2	Pistol Annies

== See also ==
- List of UK Albums Chart number ones of 2018
- List of UK Dance Singles Chart number ones of 2018
- List of UK Album Downloads Chart number ones of 2018
- List of UK Independent Albums Chart number ones of 2018
- List of UK R&B Albums Chart number ones of 2018
- List of UK Rock & Metal Albums Chart number ones of 2018
- List of UK Compilation Chart number ones of the 2010s
