= List of UK Dance Singles Chart number ones of 2018 =

The UK Dance Singles Chart is a weekly music chart compiled in the United Kingdom by the Official Charts Company (OCC) from sales of songs in the dance music genre (house, drum and bass, dubstep, etc.) in record stores and digital downloads. The chart week runs from Friday to Thursday with the chart-date given as the following Thursday.

This is a list of the songs which were number one on the UK Dance Singles Chart during 2018.

== Chart history ==
Key
†	Best-performing dance single of the year

Chart date (week ending)	Song	Artist(s)	References
4 January	"Silence"	Marshmello featuring Khalid	
11 January	"Silence"	Marshmello featuring Khalid	
18 January	"17"	MK	
25 January	"17"	MK	
1 February	"Breathe"	Jax Jones featuring Ina Wroldsen	
8 February	"Breathe"	Jax Jones featuring Ina Wroldsen	
15 February	"Breathe"	Jax Jones featuring Ina Wroldsen	
22 February	"Breathe"	Jax Jones featuring Ina Wroldsen	
1 March	"Breathe"	Jax Jones featuring Ina Wroldsen	
8 March	"Breathe"	Jax Jones featuring Ina Wroldsen	
15 March	"Breathe"	Jax Jones featuring Ina Wroldsen	
22 March	"Breathe"	Jax Jones featuring Ina Wroldsen	
29 March	"Lullaby"	Sigala and Paloma Faith	
5 April	"Lullaby"	Sigala and Paloma Faith	
12 April	"Lullaby"	Sigala and Paloma Faith	
19 April	"One Kiss" †	Calvin Harris and Dua Lipa	
26 April ^{[a]}	"One Kiss" †	Calvin Harris and Dua Lipa	
3 May ^{[a]}	"One Kiss" †	Calvin Harris and Dua Lipa	
10 May ^{[a]}	"One Kiss" †	Calvin Harris and Dua Lipa	
17 May ^{[a]}	"One Kiss" †	Calvin Harris and Dua Lipa	
24 May ^{[a]}	"One Kiss" †	Calvin Harris and Dua Lipa	
31 May ^{[a]}	"One Kiss" †	Calvin Harris and Dua Lipa	
7 June ^{[a]}	"One Kiss" †	Calvin Harris and Dua Lipa	
14 June ^{[a]}	"One Kiss" †	Calvin Harris and Dua Lipa	
21 June	"One Kiss" †	Calvin Harris and Dua Lipa	
28 June	"One Kiss" †	Calvin Harris and Dua Lipa	
5 July	"One Kiss" †	Calvin Harris and Dua Lipa	
12 July	"One Kiss" †	Calvin Harris and Dua Lipa	
19 July	"One Kiss" †	Calvin Harris and Dua Lipa	
26 July	"One Kiss" †	Calvin Harris and Dua Lipa	
2 August	"One Kiss" †	Calvin Harris and Dua Lipa	
9 August	"One Kiss" †	Calvin Harris and Dua Lipa	
16 August	"One Kiss" †	Calvin Harris and Dua Lipa	
23 August	"Body"	Loud Luxury featuring Brando	
30 August	"Promises"	Calvin Harris and Sam Smith	
6 September	"Promises"	Calvin Harris and Sam Smith	
13 September ^{[a]}	"Promises"	Calvin Harris and Sam Smith	
20 September ^{[a]}	"Promises"	Calvin Harris and Sam Smith	
27 September ^{[a]}	"Promises"	Calvin Harris and Sam Smith	
4 October ^{[a]}	"Promises"	Calvin Harris and Sam Smith	
11 October ^{[a]}	"Promises"	Calvin Harris and Sam Smith	
18 October	"Promises"	Calvin Harris and Sam Smith	
25 October ^{[a]}	"Promises"	Calvin Harris and Sam Smith	
1 November	"Promises"	Calvin Harris and Sam Smith	
8 November	"Promises"	Calvin Harris and Sam Smith	
15 November	"Promises"	Calvin Harris and Sam Smith	
22 November	"Promises"	Calvin Harris and Sam Smith	
29 November	"Promises"	Calvin Harris and Sam Smith	
6 December	"Promises"	Calvin Harris and Sam Smith	
13 December	"Promises"	Calvin Harris and Sam Smith	
20 December	"Promises"	Calvin Harris and Sam Smith	
27 December	"Promises"	Calvin Harris and Sam Smith	

- ^{a} – the single was simultaneously number-one on the singles chart.

== Number-one artists ==
Position	Artist	Weeks at number one
1	Calvin Harris	36
2	Jax Jones	8
3	Sigala	3
4	Marshmello	2
4	MK	2
5	Loud Luxury	1

== See also ==
- List of number-one singles of 2018 (UK)
- List of UK Dance Albums Chart number ones of 2018
- List of UK R&B Singles Chart number ones of 2018
- List of UK Rock & Metal Singles Chart number ones of 2018
- List of UK Independent Singles Chart number ones of 2018
