= List of UK Independent Singles Chart number ones of 2018 =

These are the Official Charts Company's UK Independent Singles Chart number-one singles of 2018.

== Chart history ==
Chart date (week ending)	Song	Artist(s)	Record label	References
4 January	"Blinded by Your Grace, Pt. 2"	Stormzy featuring MNEK	Merky	
11 January	"Blinded by Your Grace, Pt. 2"	Stormzy featuring MNEK	Merky	
18 January	"Blinded by Your Grace, Pt. 2"	Stormzy featuring MNEK	Merky	
25 January	"Blinded by Your Grace, Pt. 2"	Stormzy featuring MNEK	Merky	
1 February	"No Words"	Dave and MoStack	Dave	
8 February	"No Words"	Dave and MoStack	Dave	
15 February	"No Words"	Dave and MoStack	Dave	
22 February	"No Words"	Dave and MoStack	Dave	
1 March	"No Words"	Dave and MoStack	Dave	
8 March	"Blinded by Your Grace, Pt. 2"	Stormzy featuring MNEK	Merky	
15 March	"Sad!"	XXXTentacion	Caroline	
22 March	"Sad!"	XXXTentacion	Caroline	
29 March	"Sad!"	XXXTentacion	Caroline	
5 April	"Freaky Friday"	Lil Dicky featuring Chris Brown	Dirty Burd	
12 April ^{[a]}	"Freaky Friday"	Lil Dicky featuring Chris Brown	Dirty Burd	
19 April	"Freaky Friday"	Lil Dicky featuring Chris Brown	Dirty Burd	
26 April	"Freaky Friday"	Lil Dicky featuring Chris Brown	Dirty Burd	
3 May	"Freaky Friday"	Lil Dicky featuring Chris Brown	Dirty Burd	
10 May	"Freaky Friday"	Lil Dicky featuring Chris Brown	Dirty Burd	
17 May	"Freaky Friday"	Lil Dicky featuring Chris Brown	Dirty Burd	
24 May	"Freaky Friday"	Lil Dicky featuring Chris Brown	Dirty Burd	
31 May	"Freaky Friday"	Lil Dicky featuring Chris Brown	Dirty Burd	
7 June	"Freaky Friday"	Lil Dicky featuring Chris Brown	Dirty Burd	
14 June	"Freaky Friday"	Lil Dicky featuring Chris Brown	Dirty Burd	
21 June	"Freaky Friday"	Lil Dicky featuring Chris Brown	Dirty Burd	
28 June	"Sad!"	XXXTentacion	Caroline	
5 July	"Sad!"	XXXTentacion	Caroline	
12 July	"Sad!"	XXXTentacion	Caroline	
19 July	"Sad!"	XXXTentacion	Caroline	
26 July	"Taste"	Tyga featuring Offset	Last Kings	
2 August	"Taste"	Tyga featuring Offset	Last Kings	
9 August	"Taste"	Tyga featuring Offset	Last Kings	
16 August	"Taste"	Tyga featuring Offset	Last Kings	
23 August	"Taste"	Tyga featuring Offset	Last Kings	
30 August	"Taste"	Tyga featuring Offset	Last Kings	
6 September	"Taste"	Tyga featuring Offset	Last Kings	
13 September	"Taste"	Tyga featuring Offset	Last Kings	
20 September	"Taste"	Tyga featuring Offset	Last Kings	
27 September	"Taste"	Tyga featuring Offset	Last Kings	
4 October	"Taste"	Tyga featuring Offset	Last Kings	
11 October	"Taste"	Tyga featuring Offset	Last Kings	
18 October	"Taste"	Tyga featuring Offset	Last Kings	
25 October	"Lost Without You"	Freya Ridings	Good Soldier	
1 November	"Lost Without You"	Freya Ridings	Good Soldier	
8 November	"Lost Without You"	Freya Ridings	Good Soldier	
15 November	"Lost Without You"	Freya Ridings	Good Soldier	
22 November	"Lost Without You"	Freya Ridings	Good Soldier	
29 November	"Lost Without You"	Freya Ridings	Good Soldier	
6 December	"Lost Without You"	Freya Ridings	Good Soldier	
13 December	"Kika"	6ix9ine featuring Tory Lanez	Ten Thousand Projects	
20 December	"Lost Without You"	Freya Ridings	Good Soldier	
27 December ^{[a]}	"We Built This City"	LadBaby	FrtyFve	

== Notes ==
- ^{a} – The single was simultaneously number-one on the singles chart.
- "Kika" was not a single but the official charts still allowed it on the chart.

== Number-one Indie artists ==
Position	Artist	Weeks at number one
1	Tyga	13
2	Lil Dicky	12
3	Freya Ridings	8
4	XXXTentacion	7
5	Dave	5
5	MoStack	5
5	Stormzy	5
6	LadBaby	1
6	6ix9ine	1
6	Tory Lanez (as featuring)	1

== See also ==
- List of UK Dance Singles Chart number ones of 2018
- List of UK R&B Singles Chart number ones of 2018
- List of UK Rock & Metal Singles Chart number ones of 2018
- List of UK Independent Albums Chart number ones of 2018
