= List of UK Dance Albums Chart number ones of 2018 =

These are the Official Charts Company's UK Dance Albums Chart number ones of 2018. The chart week runs from Friday to Thursday with the chart-date given as the following Thursday.

== Chart history ==
Issue date	Album	Artist(s)	Record label	Ref.
4 January	Ibiza Classics	Pete Tong, The Heritage Orchestra & Jules Buckley	U.M.C.	
11 January	Ibiza Classics	Pete Tong, The Heritage Orchestra & Jules Buckley	U.M.C.	
18 January	Ibiza Classics	Pete Tong, The Heritage Orchestra & Jules Buckley	U.M.C.	
25 January	Running Trax 2018	Various Artists	Ministry of Sound	
1 February	The Workout Mix 2018	Various Artists	UMOD	
8 February	Funky House Classics	Various Artists	Ministry of Sound	
15 February	Funky House Classics	Various Artists	Ministry of Sound	
22 February	The Workout Mix 2018	Various Artists	UMOD	
1 March	Sleeping Is Cheating Vol. 2	Various Artists	Ministry of Sound	
8 March	Ibiza Classics	Pete Tong, The Heritage Orchestra & Jules Buckley	U.M.C.	
15 March	Everything Was Beautiful, and Nothing Hurt	Moby	Little Idiot	
22 March	Ibiza Classics	Pete Tong, The Heritage Orchestra & Jules Buckley	U.M.C.	
29 March	Ibiza Classics	Pete Tong, The Heritage Orchestra & Jules Buckley	U.M.C.	
5 April	100% Clubland X-Treme	Various Artists	UMOD	
12 April	100% Clubland X-Treme	Various Artists	UMOD	
19 April	100% Clubland X-Treme	Various Artists	UMOD	
26 April	100% Clubland X-Treme	Various Artists	UMOD	
3 May	True	Avicii	Postiva/PMRD	
10 May	100% Clubland X-Treme	Various Artists	UMOD	
17 May	Singularity	Jon Hopkins	Domino	
24 May	Ibiza Opening Party 2018	Various Artists	Absinth Beats	
31 May	Dave Pearce Trance Anthems	Various Artists	New State	
7 June	Marbella Collection 2018	Various Artists	Ministry of Sound	
14 June	Marbella Collection 2018	Various Artists	Ministry of Sound	
21 June	Best of Ibiza 2018	Various Artists	CR2	
28 June	I Love Ibiza	Various Artists	Ministry of Sound	
5 July	I Love Ibiza	Various Artists	Ministry of Sound	
12 July	I Love Ibiza	Various Artists	Ministry of Sound	
19 July	Love Island - The Pool Party	Various Artists	Ministry of Sound	
26 July	Love Island - The Pool Party	Various Artists	Ministry of Sound	
2 August	Love Island - The Pool Party	Various Artists	Ministry of Sound	
9 August	Lost In Trance	Various Artists	UMOD	
16 August	Lost In Trance	Various Artists	UMOD	
23 August	Lost In Trance	Various Artists	UMOD	
30 August	Lost In Trance	Various Artists	UMOD	
6 September	Lost In Trance	Various Artists	UMOD	
13 September	Lost In Trance	Various Artists	UMOD	
20 September	Lost In Trance	Various Artists	UMOD	
27 September	Monsters Exist	Orbital	ACP	
4 October	Lost In Trance	Various Artists	UMOD	
11 October	Brighter Days	Sigala	Ministry of Sound	
18 October	Dark all Day	Gunship	Horsie In the Hedge	
25 October	Club MTV Dance Anthems	Various Artists	UMOD	
1 November	Club MTV Dance Anthems	Various Artists	UMOD	
8 November	Pure Bassline Anthems	Various Artists	New State	
15 November	No Tourists	The Prodigy	BMG	
22 November	No Tourists	The Prodigy	BMG	
29 November	Equinoxe Infinity	Jean-Michel Jarre	RCA	
6 December	Throwback 90's Dance	Various Artists	Ministry of Sound	
13 December	Trance Nation - Ministry of Sound	Various Artists	Ministry of Sound	
20 December	Trance Nation - Ministry of Sound	Various Artists	Ministry of Sound	
27 December	Trance Nation - Ministry of Sound	Various Artists	Ministry of Sound	

== See also ==
- List of UK Albums Chart number ones of 2018
- List of UK Dance Singles Chart number ones of 2018
- List of UK Album Downloads Chart number ones of 2018
- List of UK Independent Albums Chart number ones of 2018
- List of UK R&B Albums Chart number ones of 2018
- List of UK Rock & Metal Albums Chart number ones of 2018
- List of UK Compilation Chart number ones of the 2010s
