= Drew Barrymore (disambiguation) =

Drew Barrymore (born 1975) is an American actress, producer, talk show host, author, and businesswoman.

Drew Barrymore may also refer to:

- "Drew Barrymore" (Bryce Vine song), 2017
- "Drew Barrymore" (SZA song), 2017

== See also ==
- John Drew Barrymore (1932–2004), American film actor and father of Drew Barrymore
- Georgiana Drew (1856–1893; also known as Georgie Drew Barrymore), American stage actress, comedian, and member of the Barrymore-Drew acting family
