= I'm Not Alright =

I'm Not Alright may refer to:

- I'm Not Alright (Sanctus Real song)
- I'm Not Alright (Loud Luxury and Bryce Vine song)
