= List of UK Independent Albums Chart number ones of 2018 =

These are the Official Charts Company's UK Independent Albums Chart number ones of 2018.

== Chart history ==
Key
†	Best-selling indie album of the year

Issue date	Album	Artist(s)	Record label	Ref.
5 January	Who Built the Moon?	Noel Gallagher	Sour Mash	
12 January	Who Built the Moon?	Noel Gallagher	Sour Mash	
19 January	The Gold Collection	Leo Sayer	Crimson	
26 January	Lost on the Road to Eternity	Magnum	Steamhammer	
2 February	Black Coffee	Beth Hart & Joe Bonamassa	Provogue	
9 February	Walk Between Worlds	Simple Minds	BMG	
16 February	Beautiful People Will Ruin Your Life	The Wombats	The Wombats	
23 February	A Deeper Cut	The Temperance Movement	Earache	
2 March	Gang Signs & Prayer	Stormzy	Merky	
9 March	Love Is a Basic Need	Embrace	Cooking Vinyl	
16 March	Violence	Editors	Pias	
23 March	In Your Own Sweet Time	The Fratellis	Cooking Vinyl	
30 March	Over and Out	Rick Parfitt	Ear Music	
6 April	We the Collective	Levellers	On the Fiddle	
13 April	Golden	Kylie Minogue	BMG	
20 April	Golden	Kylie Minogue	BMG	
27 April	Golden	Kylie Minogue	BMG	
4 May	Golden	Kylie Minogue	BMG	
11 May	Singularity	Jon Hopkins	Domino	
18 May	Tranquility Base Hotel & Casino †	Arctic Monkeys	Domino	
25 May	Tranquility Base Hotel & Casino †	Arctic Monkeys	Domino	
1 June	Tranquility Base Hotel & Casino †	Arctic Monkeys	Domino	
8 June	God's Favorite Customer	Father John Misty	Bella Union	
15 June	Lost & Found	Jorja Smith	Famm	
22 June	Call the Comet	Johnny Marr	New Voodoo	
29 June	Cruising With	Jane McDonald	Channel 5	
6 July	Cruising With	Jane McDonald	Channel 5	
13 July	Cruising With	Jane McDonald	Channel 5	
20 July	Beautiful Life	Rick Astley	BMG	
27 July	Beautiful Life	Rick Astley	BMG	
3 August	Testament	All Saints	AS	
10 August	Living in Extraordinary Times	James	BMG	
17 August	Move Through the Dawn	The Coral	Ignition	
24 August	Under My Skin	Gabrielle	BMG	
31 August	Marauder	Interpol	Matador	
7 September	Joy as an Act of Resistance	Idles	Partisan	
14 September	And Nothing Hurt	Spiritualized	Bella Union	
21 September	My Mind Makes Noises	Pale Waves	Dirty Hit	
28 September	Chris	Christine and the Queens	Because Music	
5 October	Gold	Chas & Dave	Crimson	
12 October	VI	You Me at Six	Underdog	
19 October	Love Is Magic	John Grant	Bella Union	
26 October	Natural Rebel	Richard Ashcroft	BMG	
2 November	Life	Boy George and Culture Club	BMG	
9 November	No Tourists	The Prodigy	BMG	
16 November	In Harmony	Aled Jones & Russell Watson	BMG	
23 November	In Harmony	Aled Jones & Russell Watson	BMG	
30 November	In Harmony	Aled Jones & Russell Watson	BMG	
7 December	In Harmony	Aled Jones & Russell Watson	BMG	
14 December	In Harmony	Aled Jones & Russell Watson	BMG	
21 December	In Harmony	Aled Jones & Russell Watson	BMG	
28 December	In Harmony	Aled Jones & Russell Watson	BMG	

== See also ==
- List of UK Rock & Metal Albums Chart number ones of 2018
- List of UK Album Downloads Chart number ones of 2018
- List of UK Dance Albums Chart number ones of 2018
- List of UK R&B Albums Chart number ones of 2018
- List of UK Independent Singles Chart number ones of 2018
