= FRVR (disambiguation) =

FRVR may refer to:

- Fox River Valley Railroad, a company that operated from 1988 to 1993
- Frvrfriday, a musician
- FRVR, an album by Two-9
