= La La Land (Bryce Vine song) =

Single by Bryce Vine featuring YG

from the album Carnival
- Released: February 28, 2019
- Length: 2:57
- Label: Sire
- Songwriter(s): Bryce Vine; JP Clark; Michael Onufrak; Keenon Jackson; Simon Rosen; Nolan Lambroza
- Producer(s): Simon Says; Sir Nolan

Bryce Vine singles chronology
"Drew Barrymore" (2018)	"La La Land" (2019)	"I'm Not Alright" (2019)

YG singles chronology
"Make It Drop" (2019)	"La La Land" (2019)	"Stop Snitchin" (2019)

Music video
- "La La Land" on YouTube

"La La Land" is a song by American rapper and singer Bryce Vine featuring American rapper YG, released through Sire Records on February 28, 2019, as the second single from Vine's debut album Carnival. It debuted at number 92 on the US Billboard Hot 100 in June 2019.

== Charts ==
Chart (2019)	Peak position
US Billboard Hot 100	75
US Pop Airplay (Billboard)	18
US Rhythmic (Billboard)	17
US Rolling Stone Top 100	59

== Certifications ==
Region	Certification	Certified units/sales
Canada (Music Canada)	3× Platinum	240,000^{‡}
New Zealand (RMNZ)	Platinum	30,000^{‡}
United States (RIAA)	Platinum	1,000,000^{‡}
^{‡} Sales+streaming figures based on certification alone.
