= Bryce Vine =

American rapper and singer (born 1988)

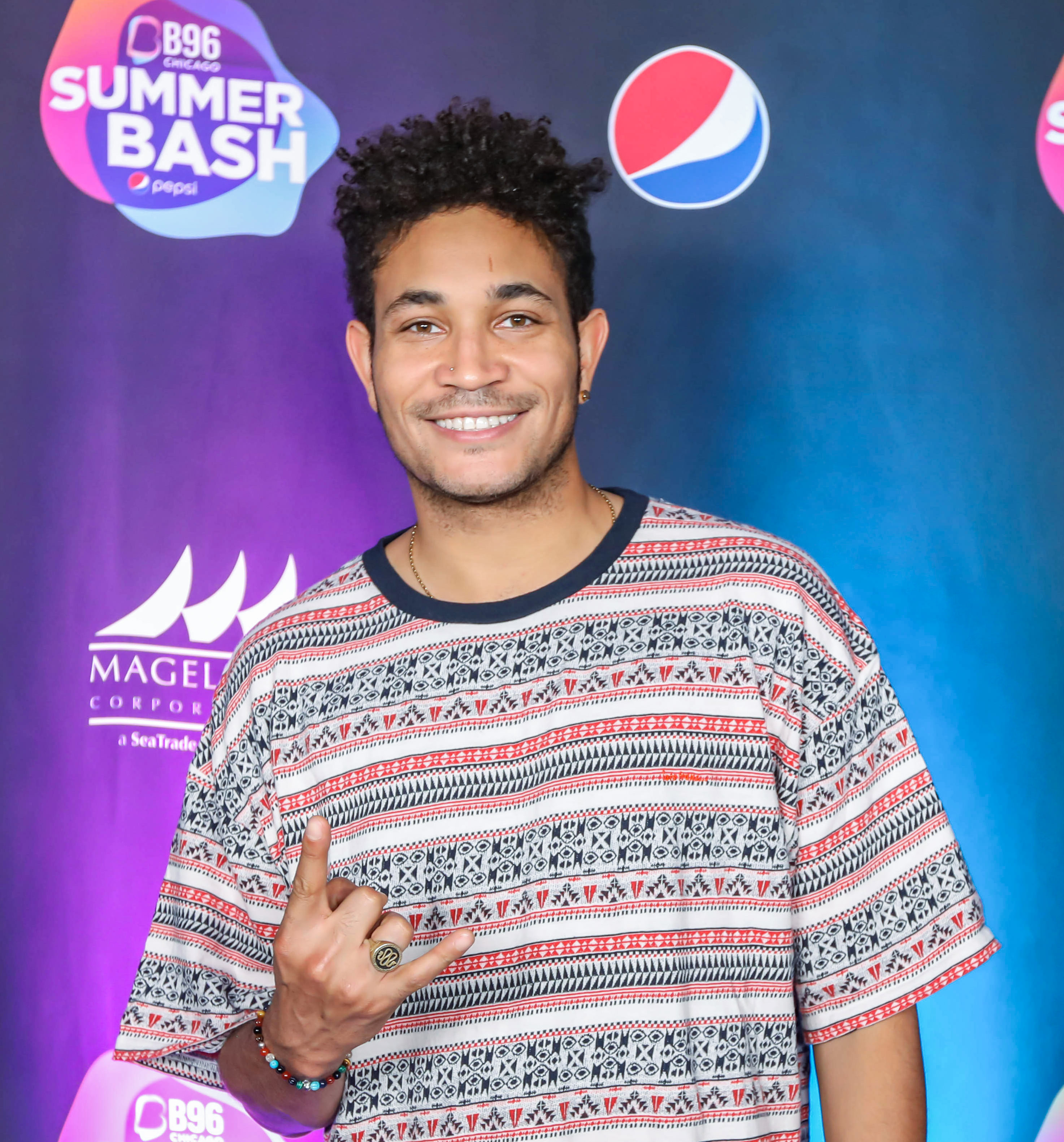
- Vine pictured at the B96 Pepsi Summer Bash 2019
- Born: Bryce Christopher Ross-Johnson; June 16, 1988 (age 38); New York City, New York, U.S.
- Occupations: Rapper; singer; songwriter
- Years active: 2010–present
- Television: The Glee Project
- Mother: Tracey Ross
- Musical career
- Genres: Hip hop; pop; alternative rock
- Instruments: Vocals; sampler; synthesizer
- Labels: Kiva House Lambroza; Sire Records; Warner; BAMBOO .45
- Website: brycevine.com

Bryce Christopher Ross-Johnson (born June 16, 1988), known professionally as Bryce Vine, is an American rapper and singer. He ventured into a career of music in 2011 when he auditioned for The Glee Project. A year later, he signed with record label Kiva House Lambroza and released an EP titled Lazy Fair. Two years later, Night Circus, another EP, was released. His debut album, Carnival, was released on July 26, 2019, featuring the tracks "Drew Barrymore" and "La La Land", his first two songs to chart on the US Billboard Hot 100.

== Early life ==
Bryce Ross-Johnson was born on June 16, 1988, in New York City, New York, to Tracey Ross and Brad Johnson. When Ross-Johnson was one, his mother moved them both to Los Angeles, California, so she could pursue a career as an actress. Eleven years later, she got a part on the hit soap opera Passions, which allowed Ross-Johnson to spend the majority of his youth in Westlake Village. When his father introduced him to '90s R&B, he convinced his mother to buy him a guitar at the age of 13. He taught himself how to play the guitar.

== Career ==
A friend of Ross-Johnson's mother suggested that he send an audition tape to the Oxygen series, The Glee Project, a reality series that served as an audition for the Fox show, Glee. He became one of the twelve finalists, but was the first contestant to be eliminated from the show. He later stated that he was thankful, saying it "was not the right place for me."

After The Glee Project, Ross-Johnson left Berklee College of Music. It was at Berklee that he adopted his stage name, choosing Vine because it was short for vinyl. After meeting his now producer, Nolan Lambroza, Ross-Johnson signed to Lambroza's label Kiva House Lambroza. On April 22, 2014, Ross-Johnson released his debut EP, Lazy Fair (a play on the French phrase "laissez-faire," this also being the name of a boat owned by his parents) which spawned two minor online hits, "Sour Patch Kids" and "Guilty Pleasure."

Another EP, Night Circus, was released on March 21, 2016, and in 2017, Ross-Johnson released the single, "Drew Barrymore." The song peaked at 46 on the US Billboard Hot 100. He released his debut album, Carnival, on July 26, 2019. "La La Land," the second single from the album, peaked at 75 on the Billboard Hot 100.

== Influences ==
Ross-Johnson is heavily influenced by Third Eye Blind, saying that they write the type of music he aspires to write - "intelligent and honest lyrics with an infectious chorus." Another heavy influence is rapper J. Cole. He says that he '"likes the storyteller aspect of him, as well as having a loud and clear message for listeners. Yet, he never takes himself too seriously."

== Discography ==
=== Studio albums ===
Title	Details	Peak chart positions
Title	Details	US
Carnival	Released: July 26, 2019; Label: Sire/Warner Records; Format: CD, digital download, streaming	99
Motel California	Released: May 2, 2025; Label: BAMBOO .45; Formal: Digital download, streaming	—
"—" denotes a recording that did not chart or was not released.

=== Extended plays ===
Title	Details
Lazy Fair	Released: April 22, 2014 (rereleased June 1, 2018); Label: Sire/Warner Records; Format: CD, digital download
Lazier Fair: Acoustic	Released: October 23, 2015; Label: Kiva House Lambroza; Format: CD, digital download
Night Circus	Released: March 21, 2016; Label: Kiva House Lambroza; Format: Digital download
Mixed Feelings	Released: May 14, 2021; Label: Sire; Format: Digital download
Problems	Released: August 21, 2020; Label: Sire; Format: Digital download
Serotonin	Released: March 10, 2023; Label: Sire; Format: Digital download

=== Singles ===
==== As lead artist ====
Title	Year	Peak chart positions				Certifications	Album
Title	Year	US	US Rhy.	US Pop	CAN	Certifications	Album
"Take Me Home"	2013	—	—	—	—		Lazy Fair
"Where the Wild Things Are"	2013	—	—	—	—		Lazy Fair
"Sour Patch Kids"	2014	—	—	—	—	RIAA: Platinum	Lazy Fair
"Thug Song"	2015	—	—	—	—		Non-album singles
"Sunflower Seeds"	2016	—	—	—	—		Non-album singles
"The Fall"	2016	—	—	—	—		Non-album singles
"Bella" (featuring Emma Zander)	2017	—	—	—	—		Non-album singles
"Drew Barrymore"	2018	46	16	16	89	RIAA: 2× Platinum; MC: Platinum	Carnival
"La La Land" (featuring YG)	2019	75	17	18	—	RIAA: Platinum; MC: Gold	Carnival
"I'm Not Alright" (with Loud Luxury)	2019	—	—	35	13	RIAA: Gold; ARIA: Gold; MC: 4× Platinum	Carnival
"Baby Girl" (solo or featuring Jeremih)	2020	—	—	29	—		Non-album single
"Problems" (featuring Grady)	2020	—	—	—	—		Problems
"Life Goes On"	2020	—	—	—	—		Problems
"Stay" (with Cheat Codes)	2020	—	—	—	—		Hellraisers, Pt. 1
"Care at All	2021	—	—	—	—		Non-album singles
"Do Si Do" (with Shaylen and KyleYouMadeThat)	2021	—	—	—	—		Non-album singles
"Miss You a Little" (featuring Lovelytheband)	2021	—	—	—	—		Non-album singles
"The Holiday"	2021	—	—	—	—		Non-album singles
"Empty Bottles" (featuring Mod Sun)	2021	—	—	—	—		Non-album singles
"American Dream"	2022	—	—	—	—		Non-album singles
"Y Can't We B Friends"	2022	—	—	—	—		Non-album singles
"Nobody"	2022	—	—	—	—		Non-album singles
"Moonrock"	2022	—	—	—	—		Non-album singles
"Help" (featuring Pheelz)	2022	—	—	—	—		Serotonin
"Gold Rush"	2023	—	—	—	—		Serotonin
"The Kids Aren't Alright"	2023	—	—	—	—		Serotonin (Deluxe)
"Margot Robbie"	2023	—	—	—	—		Non-album single
"Fix This" (with Olivia Lunny)	2023	—	—	39	—		Heartbreak on Repeat
"Run with the Sun"" (with Frank Walker and Vavo)	2026	—	—	—	—		Oasis
"—" denotes a recording that did not chart or was not released.

==== As featured artist ====
Title	Year	Album
"Coming Home" (G-Eazy featuring Bryce Vine)	2010	Big
"Cool Off" (Zak Downtown featuring Bryce Vine)	2016	Non-album singles
"Juice" (The Johnsons featuring Bryce Vine)	2016	Non-album singles
"Dollars" (Crankdat featuring Bryce Vine)	2017	Non-album singles
"Control" (Feder featuring Bryce Vine and Dan Caplen)	2018	Non-album singles
"All Hype" (Steve Aoki featuring Bryce Vine)	2022	Hiroquest: Genesis
"I Know" (Train featuring Bryce Vine and Tenille Townes)	2023	Non-album single
"Pockets Full Of Sand" (The Elovaters featuring Bryce Vine)	2026	Non-album single
