= Anders (singer) =

Canadian singer (born 1995)

- Born: Anders Ly; July 14, 1995 (age 31); Mississauga, Ontario, Canada
- Origin: Toronto, Ontario, Canada
- Genres: R&B; hip hop; trap
- Occupations: Singer; rapper; songwriter
- Years active: 2016–present
- Label: Independent

Anders Ly (born July 14, 1995), known mononymously as Anders (stylized as anders), is a Canadian singer, rapper and songwriter. Anders is a two-time Juno Award–nominated artist. He is best known for his debut EP, 669 (2017), and second EP, Twos (2018), both featuring production from Canadian Grammy-nominated music producers FrancisGotHeat and Luca “905LUCA” Polizzi, as well as for his hit single collaboration with Canadian DJ duo Loud Luxury titled "Love No More," which peaked at number 44 on the Billboard Canadian Hot 100 chart and spent 20 weeks there. Anders released his latest single collaboration with Toronto-based music producer Dimi, “Not Impressed,” on May 5, 2023.

== Early life ==
Anders Ly was born on July 14, 1995, in Mississauga, Ontario, to parents of Chinese-Vietnamese descent. He attended Rick Hansen Secondary School.

== Career ==
Anders released his first song "Choosy" on October 6, 2016, produced by fellow Canadian record producer S.L.M.N. His debut EP 669 was released on May 25, 2017, featuring the singles "You for You" and "Diamonds". Anders released his second EP Twos, an eight-track project on March 6, 2018, it featured the hit single "Bad Guy." For his EP "Twos", Anders collaborated with Canadian record producers FrancisGotHeat and Luca “905LUCA” Polizzi, as well as S.L.M.N., Jordon Manswell and Bizness Boi.

Following his EP "Twos" Anders released the single "Bad Habits" on March 29, 2019, the single "Bossy" on July 29, 2019, and the single "My Side of the Bed" on October 7, 2019. Anders also dropped the song "Nauseous" exclusively on SoundCloud on October 2, 2019. Anders then collaborated with American rapper Rich The Kid for the single "Sticky Situation" released on October 17, 2019, and produced by FrancisGotHeat.

On December 11, 2020, Anders released the single "Don't Play", which was produced by fellow Canadian record producers WondaGurl, Jenius and London Cyr. Then on January 21, 2021, anders released his third EP "Chaos"; a six-track project, including previously released singles "On Me", and "Bad Habits". On March 26, 2021, Anders released "What I Like", featuring Canadian singer and rapper FRVRFRIDAY and 6ixBuzz. On July 29, 2021, Anders released his second EP Honest a nine-track project. Anders once again collaborated with record producers FrancisGotHeat and Luca “905LUCA” Polizzi; as well as S.L.M.N., Jenius, Mark Raggio, Rhys, and Emerson Brooks.

Anders has had strategic partnerships with brands in Canada such as Nike, Rémy Martin, BMW, Adidas, McDonald's Canada and the Get Fresh Company.

== Concerts ==
=== 2018 ===
Anders held his first-ever concert in his hometown of Toronto at the Phoenix Concert Theatre on May 22, 2018. The concert was originally to be held at the Mod Club Theatre but was moved after tickets quickly sold out due to demand. Anders has had many other performances in Toronto in 2018. On November 30, 2018, Anders appeared as a surprise guest at 88rising's joint "88 Degrees and Rising" tour at Toronto venue RBC Echo Beach. He also performed "Love No More" with Loud Luxury on December 2, 2018, at the 2018 iHeartRadio Jingle Ball in Toronto. Anders ended the year headlining the 2019 New Year's Eve (NYE) event at Celebration Square in Mississauga, Ontario on December 31, 2018.

=== 2019 ===
Anders performed at the Juno Award side stage 2019 in London, Ontario, alongside Canadian artists Killy and 88Glam on March 16, 2019. Anders was then featured on Ones to Watch and performed at the Northside Sessions inside The Lounge at Live Nation in Toronto, ON on May 8, 2019.

Anders performed at the NXNE music and gaming festival in Toronto on June 16, 2019. On July 6, 2019, Anders performed at "FVDED In The Park" in Surrey, British Columbia and on August 4, 2019, Anders performed at the Osheaga Festival in Montreal, Quebec.

On November 20, 2019, Anders performed a free concert for the displaced students and staff of York Memorial Collegiate Institute at Scarlett Heights Entrepreneurial Academy.

== Discography ==
=== Extended plays ===
List of extended plays, with selected details and tracks
Title	Details	Tracks
669	Released: May 25, 2017; Label: Self-released; Format: Digital download	With or Without You; Diamonds; You for You; December (feat. Luca); The Days; Notice (Interlude); On My Way
Twos	Released: March 6, 2018; Label: Self-released; Format: CD, LP, Digital download	Bad Guy; Press It Up; Take It Back; I Don't Want Your Love; Undone; Changes; Why; Rain
Chaos	Released: January 21, 2021; Label: Self Released; Format: Digital download	Don't Play; Pray for the Day; Woah; Baewatch; On Me; Bad Habits
Honest	Released: July 29, 2021; Label: Self Released; Format: Digital download	Free Myself; Lies; Floor 21; Honest; Curious with SLMN and Kvn Rose; Faithful; Save Your Emotions; Late to the Party; All I Know

=== Singles ===
Title	Year
"Choosy"	2016
"The Days"	2016
"Re-Up"	2016
"Don't Call"	2017
"The Wall"	2017
"Why"	2017
"Attached"	2017
"Problems" (featuring Emerson Brooks)	2018
"Bad Guy"	2018
"Bad Habits"	2019
"Nauseous"	2019
"Bossy"	2019
"My Side of the Bed"	2019
"Sticky Situation" (with FrancisGotHeat featuring Rich The Kid)	2019
"On Me"	2020
"Late To The Party"	2021
"What I Like" (with 6ixBuzz featuring FRVRFRIDAY)	2021

=== Charted singles ===
Title	Year	Peak chart positions										Certifications	Album
Title	Year	CAN	AUS	AUT	DEN	NLD	NZ	SWE	SWI	UK	US Dance	Certifications	Album
"Love No More" (with Loud Luxury)	2018	44	89	—	—	—	— (Note: "Love No More" did not enter the NZ Top 40 Singles Chart, but peaked at number 27 on the NZ Hot Singles Chart.)	— (Note: "Love No More" did not enter the Swedish Singellista Chart, but peaked at number six on the Swedish Heatseeker Chart.)	—	98	23	MC: 2× Platinum; ARIA: Gold	Non-album single

=== As featured artist ===
Title	Year
"Ride or Die" (Lil Berete feat. anders)	2020
"Hallucinate" (Emerson Brooks feat. anders)	2020
"What About Me" (S.L.M.N. with Emerson & anders)	2020
"Love in the Winter" (S.L.M.N. feat. Anders)	2020
"Made it Happen" (Road Runner feat. anders)	2021
"Mine Now" (Kevin Rolly feat. anders)	2021
"When You’re Lonely" (DIMI feat. anders)	2021
"They Ain’t You" (11:11 feat. anders)	2021
"Midnight Remix" (Roderick Porter feat. anders)	2022
"Hunnids" (AR Paisley & anders)	2022

=== Music videos ===
Anders has released ten music videos over the years collaborating with many top Canadian music video directors. On October 11, 2017, Anders released the music video to his song "Diamonds." The video was directed by Elliot Clancy-Osberg. After the music video of "Diamonds," Anders released the "You For You" music video directed by Karena Evans on November 28, 2017. His most viewed video to date is "Love No More", which features DJ duo Loud Luxury, released by Armada Music on September 4, 2018. The video for "Love No More" has over a millions of views. Anders and Elliot Clancy-Osberg collaborated again for the music video for the single "Sticky Situation" ft Rich the Kid. Anders released the music video "My Side of the Bed" shot entirely on a Samsung Galaxy Note 10+ on October 21, 2019.

Title	Director	Year	Ref.
"Diamonds"	Elliot Clancy-Osberg	2017	
"You for You"	Karena Evans	2017	
"Bad Guy"	Zac Facts	2018	
“Love No More” with Loud Luxury	Christopher Evans	2018	
"My Side of the Bed"	Justin Abernathy	2019	
"Sticky Situation" (with FrancisGotHeat featuring Rich The Kid)	Elliot Clancy-Osberg	2019	
"On Me"	Marcus Letts	2020	
"Don't Play"	Christo Anesti and Gerrard Joseph	2020	
"Late to the Party"	Christo Anesti and Gerrard Joseph	2021	
"What I Like" (featuring FRVRFRIDAY and 6ixBuzz)	Orazio	2021	

=== Other music videos as featured artist ===
Title	Producer(s)	Year	Ref.
"Ride or Die" (Lil Berete featuring Anders)	King Bee Productions	2020	
"When You’re Lonely" (DIMI featuring Anders)	The.97 Collective	2021	
"They Ain’t You" (Visualizer) (11:11 featuring Anders)	Raydar LLC	2021	
"Hunnids" (AR Paisley & Anders)	Dash & Omarij88	2022	

== Awards and nominations ==
Year	Awards	Category	Nominee / work	Result
2019	Juno Award	R&B/Soul Recording of the Year	Twos	Nominated
2020	SOCAN Award	Dance Music Award	Love No More	Won
2022	Juno Award	Rap Single of the Year	What I like ft. FRVRFRIDAY	Nominated
