= Love No More =

Single by Loud Luxury and Anders
- Released: August 31, 2018
- Length: 2:48
- Label: Armada
- Songwriters: Andrew Fedyk; Joseph Depace; Anders Ly; Luca Polizzi
- Producers: Loud Luxury; Luca

Loud Luxury singles chronology
"Sex Like Me" (2018)	"Love No More" (2018)	"I'm Not Alright" (2019)

Anders singles chronology
"Problems" (2018)	"Love No More" (2018)	"Bad Habits" (2019)

Music video
- "Love No More" on YouTube

"Love No More" is a song by Canadian DJ duo Loud Luxury and Canadian singer Anders. It was released as a single on August 31, 2018, by Armada Music. It was certified triple platinum in Canada by Music Canada and gold in Australia by the ARIA.

== Background ==
Digital Journal described the song as "upbeat and infectious" and having "killer bass and catchy synths, which make it pure ear candy". It received over one million streams in two days. Loud Luxury stated about the song "We are so excited about that. We have been watching the streams the entire day. It is so addicting." Broadway World called it a "a pop-laden punch mixed in with deep house booms", while Radio ZET described it as having "deadly bass and lots of contagious rhythms." Loud Luxury told Billboard that the song "feels like the perfect way to pick up the story where we left off."

== Music video ==
The official music video for the song was released on September 4, 2018. It was directed by Christopher Evans and is noted by Digital Journal to having a "carefree vibe". The video received over 4 million views on YouTube (as of October 2022).

== Charts ==
=== Weekly charts ===
Chart (2018)	Peak position
Australia (ARIA)	89
Canada (Canadian Hot 100)	44
UK Singles (OCC)	98
US Hot Dance/Electronic Songs (Billboard)	23

=== Year-end charts ===
Chart (2018)	Position
US Hot Dance/Electronic Songs (Billboard)	84

== Certifications ==
Region	Certification	Certified units/sales
Australia (ARIA)	Gold	35,000^{‡}
Canada (Music Canada)	3× Platinum	240,000^{‡}
New Zealand (RMNZ)	Gold	15,000^{‡}
^{‡} Sales+streaming figures based on certification alone.
