= I'm Not Alright (Loud Luxury and Bryce Vine song) =

2019 song

Single by Loud Luxury and Bryce Vine

from the album Carnival
- Released: July 12, 2019
- Length: 3:05
- Label: Armada; Sire Records
- Songwriter(s): Andrew John Fedyk; Bryce Christopher Ross-Johnson; Diederik Van Elsas; James Alan Ghaleb; Joseph Julian Depace; JP Clark; Marlon Lamont McClain; Parrish Warrington; Rami Yacoub
- Producer(s): Loud Luxury; Trackside

Loud Luxury singles chronology
"Love No More" (2018)	"I'm Not Alright" (2019)	"Cold Feet" (2020)

Bryce Vine singles chronology
"La La Land" (2018)	"I'm Not Alright" (2019)	"Baby Girl" (2020)

Music video
- "I'm Not Alright" on YouTube

" I'm Not Alright" is a song by Canadian duo Loud Luxury and American rapper and singer Bryce Vine. It was released on July 12, 2019 from Bryce Vine's album Carnival.

== Background ==
“I’m Not Alright” is the brainchild of Loud Luxury’s chance encounter with Bryce Vine in Los Angeles. Loud Luxury said: “We met Vine at a party…through a friend when we got back from our fall tour,” “The next day, he came over and showed us an idea he had that was just a guitar and chorus. During our winter tour we worked across North America in hotel rooms, studios, and even an Uber with our headphones to finish writing the song.”

== Music video ==
The music video was released on October 15, 2019, directed by Miles & AJ and filmed in Los Angeles. Filled with liquor, good looking guests and epic beats, shooting the visual, and Vine said: “The Loud Luxury boys have become some of my favorite people to hang with and it all started with this song,” he says. “We shot the entire video in one night and didn’t finish until 5am, but it never felt like work.”

== Live performance ==
On September 26, 2019, Loud Luxury and Vine performed the song on The Late Late Show.

== Charts ==
=== Weekly charts ===
Chart (2019–2020)	Peak position
Belgium (Ultratip Bubbling Under Flanders)	4
Belgium (Ultratip Bubbling Under Wallonia)	41
Canada (Canadian Hot 100)	13
Canada AC (Billboard)	31
Canada CHR/Top 40 (Billboard)	5
Canada Hot AC (Billboard)	4
Sweden Heatseeker (Sverigetopplistan)	15
US Hot Dance/Electronic Songs (Billboard)	12
US Mainstream Top 40 (Billboard)	35

=== Year-end charts ===
Chart (2019)	Position
Canada (Canadian Hot 100)	55
US Hot Dance/Electronic Songs (Billboard)	54
Chart (2020)	Position
US Hot Dance/Electronic Songs (Billboard)	56

== Certifications ==
Region	Certification	Certified units/sales
Australia (ARIA)	Gold	35,000^{‡}
Canada (Music Canada)	5× Platinum	400,000^{‡}
New Zealand (RMNZ)	Gold	15,000^{‡}
United States (RIAA)	Gold	500,000^{‡}
^{‡} Sales+streaming figures based on certification alone.
