= Drew Barrymore (Bryce Vine song) =

Single by Bryce Vine

from the album Carnival
- Released: December 1, 2017
- Length: 3:12; 4:08 (Crankdat remix); 3:37 (w/ Wale)
- Songwriters: Bryce Christopher Ross-Johnson; JP Clark; Julia Michaels; Nolan Lambroza
- Producers: Bryce Vine; Sir Nolan

Bryce Vine singles chronology
"Bella" (2017)	"Drew Barrymore" (2017)	"La La Land" (2019)

Music video
- "Drew Barrymore" on YouTube

"Drew Barrymore" is a song by American rapper and singer Bryce Vine. Through a virtual appearance on one of The Kelly Clarkson Show's first episodes, Drew Barrymore herself told Bryce that she was a fan of both him and Kelly.

== Background ==
Bryce says he chose Drew as the ideal metaphor after seeing her in The Wedding Singer. He said that Drew is "kind of Hollywood royalty, but she's kind of a badass, but she's kind of sweet".

=== Music video ===
The music video for the song was released in 2018 and featured actress Christian Serratos.

== Charts ==
=== Weekly charts ===
Chart (2018)	Peak position
Canada (Canadian Hot 100)	89
US Billboard Hot 100	46
US Mainstream Top 40 (Billboard)	16
US Rhythmic (Billboard)	16

=== Year-end charts ===
Chart (2018)	Position
US Mainstream Top 40 (Billboard)	49

== Certifications ==
Region	Certification	Certified units/sales
Canada (Music Canada)	2× Platinum	160,000^{‡}
New Zealand (RMNZ)	Gold	15,000^{‡}
United States (RIAA)	2× Platinum	2,000,000^{‡}
^{‡} Sales+streaming figures based on certification alone.
