= Frvrfriday =

Rwandan-Canadian musician

- Also known as: FRVRFRIDAY
- Born: Tommy Ruhingubugi; Rwanda
- Origin: Canadian
- Genres: Hip hop; R&B
- Occupations: Singer; rapper; record producer; songwriter
- Years active: 2017–present

Frvrfriday (stylized in all caps) is the stage name of Tommy Ruhingubugi, a Rwandan-Canadian singer, rapper and record producer. He is best known for his 2020 single "Window Shopping" which featured American rapper Lil Baby and "What I Like" featuring Anders which earned him a nomination for Rap Single of the Year at the Juno Awards of 2022.

== Early life ==
Tommy was born in Rwanda. When he was aged two, he moved to Montreal, Canada growing up with his parents. He made his first beat with his family computer at the age of 14.

== Career ==
Tommy released his debut single "Got It" in 2017. The same year, he released 2 EPs, "More Than You Know" and "Offline". After releasing couple singles, the following year his 3rd 6 tracked Extended play, "WHOISFRIDAY", was released. Since then he has released multiple singles including "Nana" which was later sampled in Pop Smoke, Dababy and Lil Baby "For The Night". In July, he announced that his long-awaited "Cruise Control" EP is set to release July 21st which will include songs "Said & Done" and "Summer's Up".

== Critical reception ==
In April 2020, Complex called "Nana" a laid-back banger and was listed as number 4 in 10 best Canadian songs of the month.
