= Brando (singer) =

American singer and songwriter

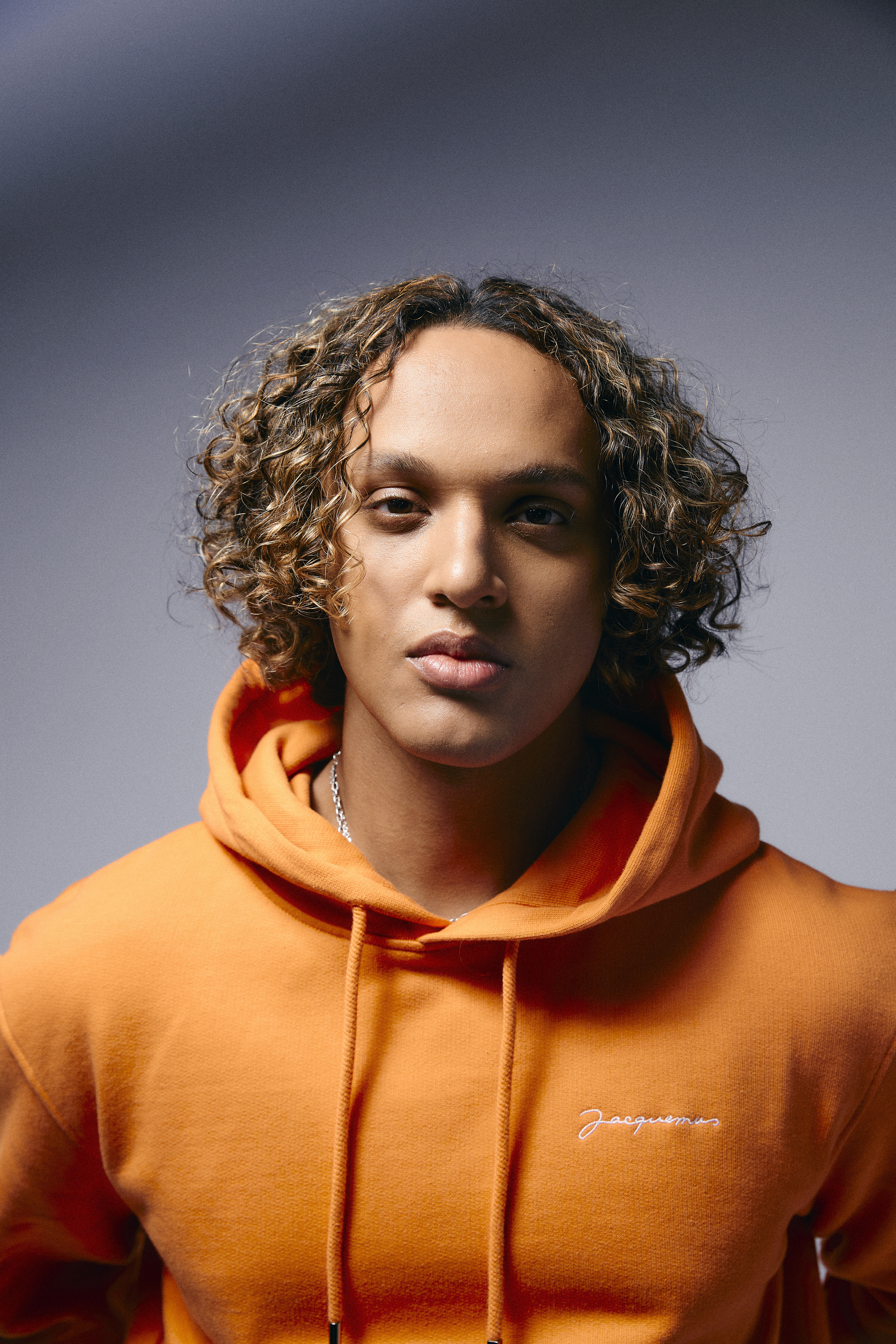
- Brando in Los Angeles

Background information
- Born: Marlon Lamont McClain II; Los Angeles, California, U.S.
- Occupations: Singer; songwriter
- Instrument: Vocals
- Years active: 2017–present
- Label: Armada

Marlon Lamont McClain II, known professionally as Brando, is an American singer and songwriter from Los Angeles, California. He is best known for the song "Body" with Loud Luxury.

== Early life and career ==
Brando is the son of singer-songwriter Marlon McClain, best known as a member of Dazz Band and Pleasure.

In 2017, Brando was featured on the multi-platinum-certified song "Body" with Loud Luxury, who discussed the collaboration by stating that they were originally in Los Angeles and had moved there two years before. In an interview they mentioned how Brando was the recommended singer. After going to a show Brando was performing at, they saw his performance and noticed "he was doing his own project with somebody else." They later collaborated for the song "Body".

== Career ==
Brando began writing songs at age 12 and emerged in the EDM scene with his breakout vocal on Loud Luxury's "Body" (2017).

Following the global success of "Body", Brando signed with Armada Music and pursued a solo career blending R&B, pop, and electronic styles. His 2020 solo hit "Look into My Eyes" topped Australian radio for 10 weeks and was certified gold by ARIA.

In interviews, Brando emphasizes melody and emotional storytelling, drawing inspiration from his musical upbringing and studio improvisation. He prefers handling his own social media and prioritizes wellness and authenticity in his creative process.

Recent releases include "Crash" and "R U DOWN?" by Loud Luxury, "The Heat" by Alok featuring Jazzy, and other DJ collaborations with Imanbek, Matoma, Don Diablo and more.

Brando also has millions of streams across his solo releases, and is continuing to release new music as an artist in addition to writing for others.

== Discography ==
=== Albums / extended plays ===
Title	Year	Format	Notable tracks
Slip N Slide	2021	EP	"Close to You"; "Yes or No"; "All Night"
Shut Up & Dance	2024	Album	"Too Close"; "Luv"; "Mine"; "Last Kiss"
We Do This	2024	EP	"We Do This"; "Burn It Down"; "Do Me Like That"; "Suburbia"

=== Singles as lead artist ===
Title	Year	Chart peak (AUS)	Certifications	Album / EP
"Drop Top"	2019	—	—	Non‑album single
"Look Into My Eyes"	2020	24	ARIA Gold; 2× Platinum	Slip N Slide
"Close to You"	2021	—	—	Slip N Slide
"Yes or No"	2021	—	—	Slip N Slide
"All Night"	2021	—	—	Slip N Slide
"Party's Over" (with Andrelli & AVIAN GREYS)	2022	—	—	Non-album singles
"Fake" (with Imanbek & Crazy Donkey feat. Paradigm)	2023	—	—	Non-album singles
"Wasted Love" (with DubDogz & Crazy Donkey)	2023	—	—	Non-album singles
"Burn It Down"	2023	—	—	We Do This
"Do Me Like That"	2023	—	—	We Do This
"Too Close"	2023	—	—	Shut Up & Dance
"Luv"	2023	—	—	Shut Up & Dance
"Mine"	2024	—	—	Shut Up & Dance
"Last Kiss"	2024	—	—	Shut Up & Dance
"Shut Up & Dance"	2024	—	—	Shut Up & Dance
"Suburbia" (with PICKUPLINES & Travie McCoy)	2024	—	—	We Do This
"We Do This"	2024	—	—	We Do This
"Holding On to Us" (with LMNT 115)	2025	—	—	Non-album single

=== Singles as featured artist ===
Title	Year	Artist(s)	Chart peak (AUS)	Certifications	Release
"Body"	2017	Loud Luxury featuring Brando	7	ARIA 7× Platinum; BPI 3× Platinum; MC Diamond; RIAA Platinum	Non‑album singles
"Out of My League"	—	Kiesza featuring Brando	—	—	Non‑album singles
"The Bender"	—	Matoma featuring Brando	—	—	Non‑album singles
