= Loud Luxury =

Canadian DJ duo

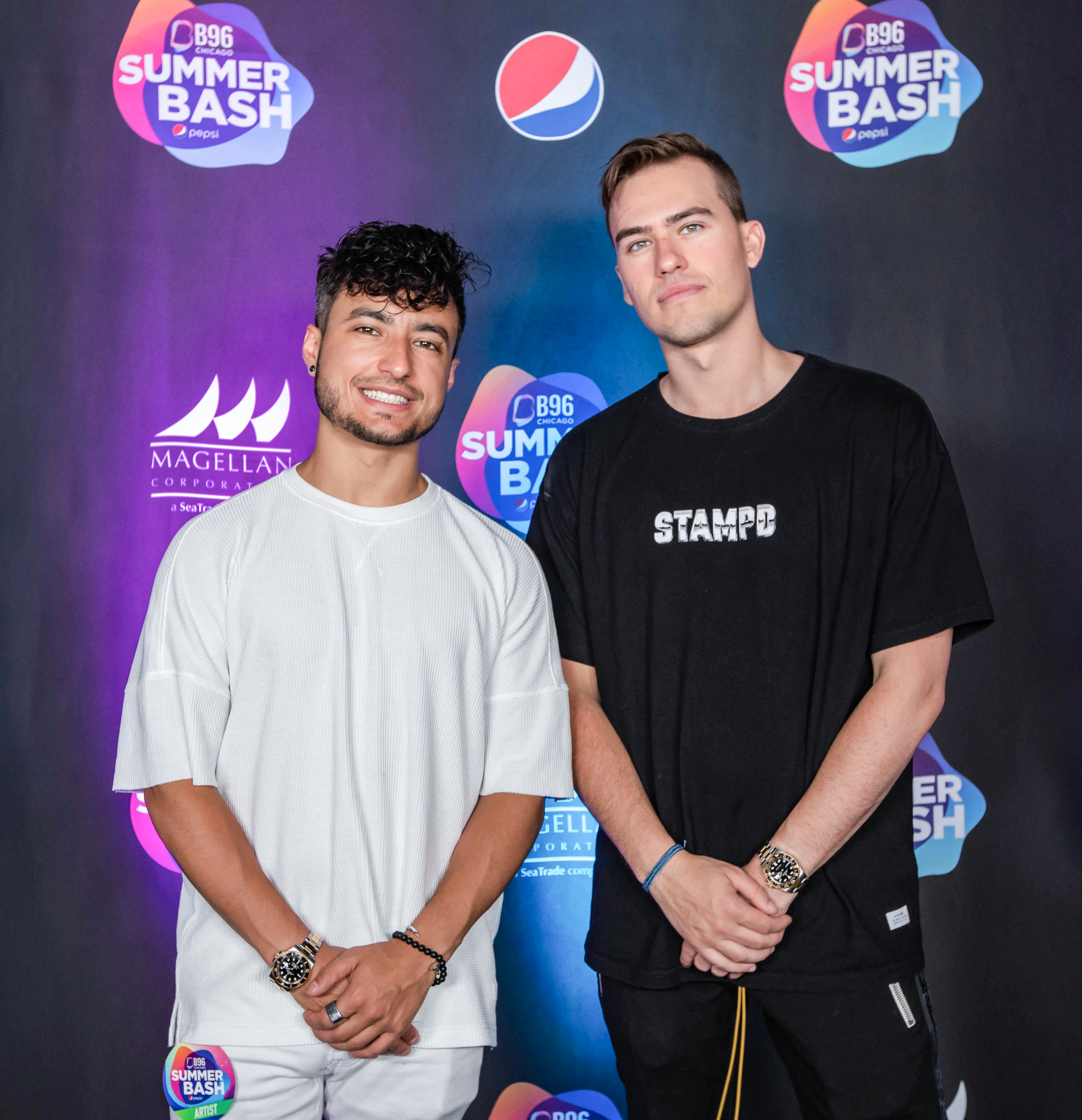
- Loud Luxury at the B96 Pepsi SummerBash 2019

Background information
- Origin: London, Ontario, Canada
- Genres: Deep house; future house
- Years active: 2012–present
- Labels: Armada; AFTR:HRS; Xploded Music; All Around the World; Republic Records
- Members: Andrew Fedyk; Joe De Pace

Loud Luxury are a Canadian music production and DJ duo consisting of Andrew Fedyk and Joe De Pace. They are currently based in Los Angeles, California. They gained recognition following their 2017 release "Body" and their remix of the Martin Garrix and Dua Lipa single "Scared to Be Lonely".

== History ==
The duo were formed when Fedyk and De Pace, who met at University of Western Ontario, collaborated. Going to a Porter Robinson concert, they became inspired with the way Robinson had connected with the crowd. In December 2016, they released the song "See It Again".

In 2017, they remixed Martin Garrix and Dua Lipa's song "Scared to Be Lonely", which was included on the remix EP. They released an original single titled "Body" through Armin van Buuren's record label Armada Music. The song, which features vocalist Brando, debuted on the Billboard Hot Dance/Electronic Songs chart at number 49, selling 20,000 downloads and gaining over 40,000,000 streams. On February 17, 2017, Loud Luxury collaborated with fellow Canadian deep house musician Ryan Shepherd to release a cover of Craig David's "Fill Me In" (initially retitled "Something to Say") on Tiesto's record label AFTR:HRS.

In 2018, Loud Luxury received a nomination in the Independent Music Video category at the 9th Hollywood Music in Media Awards for "Show Me" featuring Canadian rock trio Nikki's Wives.

At the Juno Awards of 2019, they won the Juno Award for Dance Recording of the Year for "Body". They were also nominated in the categories of Juno Fan Choice, Breakthrough Group of the Year, and Single of the Year (also for "Body").

In 2019, Loud Luxury performed at EDC Las Vegas and Lollapalooza in Chicago.

At the Juno Awards of 2020, they won the Juno Award for Group of the Year. They were also nominated once again for Juno Fan Choice and for Dance Recording of the Year for "I'm Not Alright" (with Bryce Vine). Since then, they have received six additional nominations.

On the September 2, 2023 Billboard Dance/Mix Show Airplay chart, "If Only I" (with Two Friends and Bebe Rexha) became Loud Luxury's first #1 song on this chart. It was #1 for two weeks.

On the March 29, 2025 Billboard Dance/Mix Show Airplay chart, "Crash" became their second #1, also for two weeks.

In a post on Tik Tok on June 24, 2025, Loud Luxury announced they had signed with Republic Records/Casablanca Recordings, which was followed by the release of their debut single for the label, "R U Down?". It reached #1 on the September 20, 2025 Billboard Dance/Mix Show Airplay chart.

Loud Luxury reached #1 on the Billboard Dance/Mix Show Airplay chart with "Love You for Life." (with Emily Roberts) on March 7, 2026.

== Discography ==
=== Extended plays ===
Title	Details	Peak chart positions	Certifications
Title	Details	CAN	Certifications
Nights Like This	Released: March 27, 2020; Label: Armada Music; Formats: Digital download, streaming	55	MC: Gold
Holiday Hills	Released: August 13, 2021; Label: Armada Music; Formats: Digital download, streaming	96	

=== Singles ===
Title	Year	Peak chart positions										Certifications	Album
Title	Year	CAN	AUS	AUT	DEN	NLD	NZ	SWE	SWI	UK	US	Certifications	Album
"All for You" (featuring Kaleena Zanders)	2015	—	—	—	—	—	—	—	—	—	—		Non-album single
"Going Under" (with Borgeous)	2016	—	—	—	—	—	—	—	—	—	—		13
"Fill Me In" (with Ryan Shepherd)	2017	—	—	—	—	—	—	—	—	—	—	MC: Gold	Non-album singles
"Show Me" (featuring Nikki's Wives)	2017	—	—	—	—	—	—	—	—	—	—		Non-album singles
"Body" (featuring Brando)	2017	3	7	7	5	19	10	49	15	4	80	MC: Diamond; ARIA: 7× Platinum; BPI: 3× Platinum; GLF: Gold; IFPI DEN: 3× Platinum; RIAA: Platinum; RMNZ: 7× Platinum	Non-album singles
"Sex Like Me" (featuring Dyson)	2018	—	—	—	—	—	—	—	—	—	—		Non-album singles
"Love No More" (with Anders)	2018	44	89	—	—	—	— (Note: "Love No More" did not enter the NZ Top 40 Singles Chart, but peaked at number 27 on the NZ Hot Singles Chart.)	— (Note: "Love No More" did not enter the Swedish Singellista Chart, but peaked at number six on the Swedish Heatseeker Chart.)	—	98	—	MC: 3× Platinum; ARIA: Gold; RMNZ: Gold	Non-album singles
"I'm Not Alright" (with Bryce Vine)	2019	13	—	—	—	—	—	— (Note: "I'm Not Alright" did not enter the Swedish Singellista Chart, but peaked at number 15 on the Swedish Heatseeker Chart.)	—	—	—	MC: 5× Platinum; ARIA: Gold; RIAA: Gold; RMNZ: Gold	Carnival
"Cold Feet"	2020	41	—	—	—	—	—	—	—	—	—	MC: 2× Platinum	Nights Like This
"Nights Like This" (with Cid)	2020	—	—	—	—	—	—	—	—	—	—	MC: Gold	Nights Like This
"Gummy" (featuring Brando)	2020	—	—	—	—	—	—	—	—	—	—	MC: Gold	Nights Like This
"Aftertaste" (featuring Morgan St. Jean)	2020	40	—	—	—	—	—	—	—	—	—	MC: 2× Platinum	Nights Like This
"Like Gold" (with Frank Walker featuring Stephen Puth)	2020	41	—	—	—	—	—	—	—	—	—	MC: 2× Platinum	Non-album singles
"Amnesia" (with Ship Wrek featuring Gashi)	2021	97	—	—	—	—	—	—	—	—	—	MC: Gold	Non-album singles
"Turning Me Up (Hadal Ahbek)" (with Issam Alnajjar and Ali Gatie)	2021	47	—	—	—	—	—	—	—	—	—	MC: Gold	Baree?
"Red Handed" (with Thutmose)	2021	80	—	—	—	—	—	—	—	—	—	MC: Gold	Holiday Hills
"Wasted" (featuring Wav3pop)	2021	99	—	—	—	—	—	—	—	—	—		Holiday Hills
"Safe with Me" (featuring Drew Love)	2021	—	—	—	—	—	—	—	—	—	—		Holiday Hills
"Mistakes" (with Cat Dealers)	2021	—	—	—	—	—	—	—	—	—	—		Holiday Hills
"Lemons" (featuring Tyler Mann)	2021	—	—	—	—	—	—	—	—	—	—		Holiday Hills
"These Nights" (featuring Kiddo)	2022	40	—	—	—	—	—	—	—	—	—	MC: Gold	Non-album singles
"Afterparty" (with Hook N Sling)	2022	—	—	—	—	—	—	—	—	—	—		Non-album singles
"Next to You" (with Dvbbs featuring Kane Brown)	2023	34	—	—	—	—	—	—	—	—	—	MC: Platinum	Non-album singles
"If Only I" (with Two Friends featuring Bebe Rexha)	2023	46	—	—	—	—	— (Note: "If Only I" did not enter the NZ Top 40 Singles Chart, but peaked at number 38 on the NZ Hot Singles Chart.)	—	—	—	—	MC: Platinum	Non-album singles
"Young & Foolish" (featuring charlieonnafriday)	2023	—	—	—	—	—	—	—	—	—	—		Non-album singles
"Cool Like That" (featuring Bobby Shmurda)	2024	—	—	—	—	—	—	—	—	—	—		Non-album singles
"Crash"	2025	91	—	—	—	—	—	—	—	—	—		Non-album singles
"R U Down?"	2025	—	—	—	—	—	—	—	—	—	—		Non-album singles
"Uh Oh!" (with Natalie Jane)	2025	76	—	—	—	—	—	—	—	—	—		Non-album singles
"Love You for Life." (with Emily Roberts)	2025	—	—	—	—	—	—	—	—	—	—		Non-album singles
"Out Late." (with SadBoi)	2026	—	—	—	—	—	—	—	—	—	—		Non-album singles
"—" denotes a recording that did not chart or was not released.

== Awards and nominations ==
Awards	Year	Category	Nominee / work	Result
Juno Awards	2019	Breakthrough Group of the Year	Loud Luxury	Nominated
Juno Awards	2019	Fan Choice Award	Loud Luxury	Nominated
Juno Awards	2019	Single of the Year	"Body"	Nominated
Juno Awards	2019	Dance Recording of the Year	"Body"	Won
Juno Awards	2020	Group of the Year	Loud Luxury	Won
Juno Awards	2020	Fan Choice Award	Loud Luxury	Nominated
Juno Awards	2020	Dance Recording of the Year	"I'm Not Alright"	Nominated
Juno Awards	2021	Group of the Year	Loud Luxury	Nominated
Juno Awards	2022	Fan Choice Award	Loud Luxury	Nominated
Juno Awards	2022	Group of the Year	Loud Luxury	Nominated
Juno Awards	2023	Dance Recording of the Year	"These Nights"	Nominated
Juno Awards	2024	Group of the Year	Loud Luxury	Nominated
Juno Awards	2024	Dance Recording of the Year	"Next to You"	Nominated
