= List of UK R&B Singles Chart number ones of 2018 =

The logo of the Official Charts Company, responsible for compiling all of the official music charts in the United Kingdom, including the R&B singles chart.

The UK R&B Singles Chart is a weekly chart that ranks the 40 biggest-selling singles and albums that are classified in the R&B genre in the United Kingdom. The chart is compiled by the Official Charts Company, and is based on both physical, and digital sales.

The following are the songs which have topped the UK R&B Singles Chart in 2018.

== Number-one singles ==
| Chart date (week ending) | Song | Artist(s) | Record label | References |
|---|---|---|---|---|
| 4 January ^{[b]} | "River" | Eminem featuring Ed Sheeran | Interscope | |
| 11 January ^{[b]} | "River" | Eminem featuring Ed Sheeran | Interscope | |
| 18 January ^{[b]} | "River" | Eminem featuring Ed Sheeran | Interscope | |
| 25 January ^{[a]} | "River" | Eminem featuring Ed Sheeran | Interscope | |
| 1 February ^{[a]} | "God's Plan" | Drake | Cash Money/Republic | |
| 8 February ^{[a]} | "God's Plan" | Drake | Cash Money/Republic | |
| 15 February ^{[a]} | "God's Plan" | Drake | Cash Money/Republic | |
| 22 February ^{[a]} | "God's Plan" | Drake | Cash Money/Republic | |
| 1 March ^{[a]} | "God's Plan" | Drake | Cash Money/Republic | |
| 8 March ^{[a]} | "God's Plan" | Drake | Cash Money/Republic | |
| 15 March ^{[a]} | "God's Plan" | Drake | Cash Money/Republic | |
| 22 March ^{[a]} | "God's Plan" | Drake | Cash Money/Republic | |
| 29 March ^{[a]} | "God's Plan" | Drake | Cash Money/Republic | |
| 5 April | "God's Plan" | Drake | Cash Money/Republic | |
| 12 April | "God's Plan" | Drake | Cash Money/Republic | |
| 19 April ^{[a]} | "Nice for What" | Drake | Cash Money/Republic | |
| 26 April | "Nice for What" | Drake | Cash Money/Republic | |
| 3 May | "Nice for What" | Drake | Cash Money/Republic | |
| 10 May | "Nice for What" | Drake | Cash Money/Republic | |
| 17 May | "Nice for What" | Drake | Cash Money/Republic | |
| 24 May | "Nice for What" | Drake | Cash Money/Republic | |
| 31 May | "Nice for What" | Drake | Cash Money/Republic | |
| 7 June | "Nice for What" | Drake | Cash Money/Republic | |
| 14 June | "Nice for What" | Drake | Cash Money/Republic | |
| 21 June | "Nice for What" | Drake | Cash Money/Republic | |
| 28 June | "Better Now" | Post Malone | Republic | |
| 5 July | "Sad!" | XXXTentacion | Caroline | |
| 12 July ^{[b]} | "Don't Matter to Me" | Drake featuring Michael Jackson | Cash Money/Republic | |
| 19 July ^{[b]} | "In My Feelings" | Drake | Cash Money/Republic | |
| 26 July ^{[a]} ^{[b]} | "In My Feelings" | Drake | Cash Money/Republic | |
| 2 August ^{[a]} ^{[b]} | "In My Feelings" | Drake | Cash Money/Republic | |
| 9 August ^{[a]} ^{[b]} | "In My Feelings" | Drake | Cash Money/Republic | |
| 16 August ^{[a]} ^{[b]} | "In My Feelings" | Drake | Cash Money/Republic | |
| 23 August | "In My Feelings" | Drake | Cash Money/Republic | |
| 30 August | "In My Feelings" | Drake | Cash Money/Republic | |
| 6 September | "In My Feelings" | Drake | Cash Money/Republic | |
| 13 September ^{[b]} | "The Ringer" | Eminem | Interscope | |
| 20 September | "I Love It" | Kanye West and Lil Pump | Def Jam | |
| 27 September | "I Love It" | Kanye West and Lil Pump | Def Jam | |
| 4 October | "I Love It" | Kanye West and Lil Pump | Def Jam | |
| 11 October | "I Love It" | Kanye West and Lil Pump | Def Jam | |
| 18 October ^{[a]} | "Funky Friday" | Dave and Fredo | Dave/Neighbourhood | |
| 25 October | "Funky Friday" | Dave and Fredo | Dave/Neighbourhood | |
| 1 November | "Funky Friday" | Dave and Fredo | Dave/Neighbourhood | |
| 8 November | "Funky Friday" | Dave and Fredo | Dave/Neighbourhood | |
| 15 November | "Funky Friday" | Dave and Fredo | Dave/Neighbourhood | |
| 22 November | "Funky Friday" | Dave and Fredo | Dave/Neighbourhood | |
| 29 November | "Funky Friday" | Dave and Fredo | Dave/Neighbourhood | |
| 6 December | "Funky Friday" | Dave and Fredo | Dave/Neighbourhood | |
| 13 December | "Kika" | 6ix9ine featuring Tory Lanez | Ten Thousand Projects | |
| 20 December | "Sunflower" | Post Malone featuring Swae Lee | Republic | |
| 27 December | "Sunflower" | Post Malone featuring Swae Lee | Republic | |

== Notes ==
- ^{a} - The single was simultaneously number one on the UK Singles Chart.
- ^{b} - The artist was simultaneously number one on the R&B Albums Chart.

== See also ==
- List of UK Singles Chart number ones of 2018
- List of UK R&B Albums Chart number ones of 2018
- List of UK Dance Singles Chart number ones of 2018
