= Body (Loud Luxury song) =

2017 single by Loud Luxury

Single by Loud Luxury featuring Brando
- Released: October 27, 2017
- Genre: House; dance; folktronica
- Length: 2:43
- Label: Armada; All Around the World
- Songwriters: Cassio Lopes; Marlon McClain; Joseph de Pace; Andrew Fedyk; Nick Henriques
- Producer: Loud Luxury

Loud Luxury singles chronology
"Show Me" (2017)	"Body" (2017)	"Sex Like Me" (2018)

Brando singles chronology
"Body" (2017)	"In Time" (2018)

Music video
- "Body" on YouTube

"Body" is a song by Canadian duo Loud Luxury featuring American singer Brando, released as a single on October 27, 2017, through Armada Music and All Around the World Productions. It was the duo's breakthrough hit and reached the top five in Canada, Denmark, Ireland and the UK, as well as the top 10 in Australia, Austria, Germany and New Zealand.

At the Juno Awards of 2019, the song won the Juno Award for Dance Recording of the Year, and was a shortlisted nominee for Single of the Year.

The song reached one billion streams in late March 2023 on streaming platform Spotify.

== Background and composition ==
While attending a different act's showcase in Hollywood, Loud Luxury noticed Brando, who was part of the opening band. They emailed him and his manager, and eventually were presented with a hip hop demo Brando had been working on called "Body On My", which they called "silly" with a "DJ Mustard, strip-club anthem vibe". They still enjoyed Brando's vocals, so reworked the track, speeding it up and layering "emotional chords" underneath the vocal track. References in the lyrics to riding and dining in "the six" refer to a nickname for Toronto.

== Music video ==
The official lyric video was filmed in Los Angeles and stars model and wellness coach Chelcie May.

== Live performances ==
On March 17, 2019, Loud Luxury performed the song along with the Western University Marching Band as part of the Juno Awards opening.

== Charts ==
=== Weekly charts ===
Chart (2017–2019)	Peak position
Australia (ARIA)	7
Austria (Ö3 Austria Top 40)	7
Belarus Airplay (Eurofest)	16
Belgium (Ultratop 50 Flanders)	29
Belgium (Ultratop 50 Wallonia)	21
Canada (Canadian Hot 100)	3
Czech Republic Airplay (ČNS IFPI)	40
Czech Republic Singles Digital (ČNS IFPI)	15
Denmark (Tracklisten)	5
France (SNEP)	132
France Airplay (SNEP)	47
Germany (GfK)	7
Hungary (Dance Top 40)	31
Hungary (Rádiós Top 40)	1
Hungary (Single Top 40)	16
Hungary (Stream Top 40)	22
Ireland (IRMA)	4
Netherlands (Single Top 100)	19
New Zealand (Recorded Music NZ)	10
Norway (VG-lista)	36
Poland Airplay (ZPAV)	2
Slovakia Airplay (ČNS IFPI)	10
Slovakia Singles Digital (ČNS IFPI)	16
Slovenia (SloTop50)	5
Sweden (Sverigetopplistan)	49
Switzerland (Schweizer Hitparade)	15
UK Singles (Official Charts)	4
UK Dance (Official Charts)	1
US Billboard Hot 100	80
US Dance Club Songs (Billboard)	41
US Hot Dance/Electronic Songs (Billboard)	7
US Mainstream Top 40 (Billboard)	21

=== Year-end charts ===
Chart (2018)	Position
Australia (ARIA)	40
Austria (Ö3 Austria Top 40)	15
Belgium (Ultratop Flanders)	86
Canada (Canadian Hot 100)	5
Denmark (Tracklisten)	21
Germany (Official German Charts)	20
Iceland (Plötutíóindi)	42
Ireland (IRMA)	14
Netherlands (Dutch Top 40)	72
Netherlands (Single Top 100)	89
New Zealand (Recorded Music NZ)	47
Poland (ZPAV)	15
Switzerland (Schweizer Hitparade)	38
UK Singles (Official Charts Company)	33
US Hot Dance/Electronic Songs (Billboard)	19
Chart (2019)	Position
Australia (ARIA)	33
Austria (Ö3 Austria Top 40)	62
Canada (Canadian Hot 100)	88
CIS (Tophit)	178
Denmark (Tracklisten)	54
Germany (Official German Charts)	69
Hungary (Dance Top 40)	89
Hungary (Rádiós Top 40)	3
Ireland (IRMA)	47
New Zealand (Recorded Music NZ)	31
Poland (ZPAV)	72
Russia Airplay (Tophit)	161
Slovenia (SloTop50)	20
Switzerland (Schweizer Hitparade)	50
UK Singles (Official Charts Company)	65
US Hot Dance/Electronic Songs (Billboard)	17
Chart (2020)	Position
Hungary (Rádiós Top 40)	39

== Certifications ==
Region	Certification	Certified units/sales
Australia (ARIA)	7× Platinum	490,000^{‡}
Belgium (BRMA)	Gold	20,000^{‡}
Canada (Music Canada)	Diamond	800,000^{‡}
Denmark (IFPI Danmark)	3× Platinum	270,000^{‡}
France (SNEP)	Gold	100,000^{‡}
Germany (BVMI)	2× Platinum	800,000^{‡}
Italy (FIMI)	Platinum	50,000^{‡}
New Zealand (RMNZ)	7× Platinum	210,000^{‡}
Norway (IFPI Norway)	Platinum	60,000^{‡}
Spain (Promusicae)	Platinum	60,000^{‡}
United Kingdom (BPI)	3× Platinum	1,800,000^{‡}
United States (RIAA)	Platinum	1,000,000^{‡}
Streaming
Sweden (GLF)	Gold	4,000,000^{†}
^{‡} Sales+streaming figures based on certification alone.^{†} Streaming-only figures based on certification alone.
