= List of UK Rock & Metal Singles Chart number ones of 2018 =

The UK Rock & Metal Singles Chart is a record chart which ranks the best-selling rock and heavy metal songs in the United Kingdom. Compiled and published by the Official Charts Company, the data is based on each track's weekly physical sales, digital downloads and streams. In 2018 to date, six singles have topped the 25 published charts. The first number one of the year was "Christmas Time (Don't Let the Bells End)" by The Darkness. "Bohemian Rhapsody" by Queen was the most successful single of the year, spending 15 weeks at number one. "Don't Stop Me Now" by Queen has spent five weeks of the year to date at number one. "Can't Stop" by Red Hot Chili Peppers spent four weeks of the year at number one, while "Sweet Child o' Mine" was also number one for four weeks.

Bring Me the Horizon spent three weeks at number one with "Mantra", the longest run at number one for any new release in 2018.

== Chart history ==
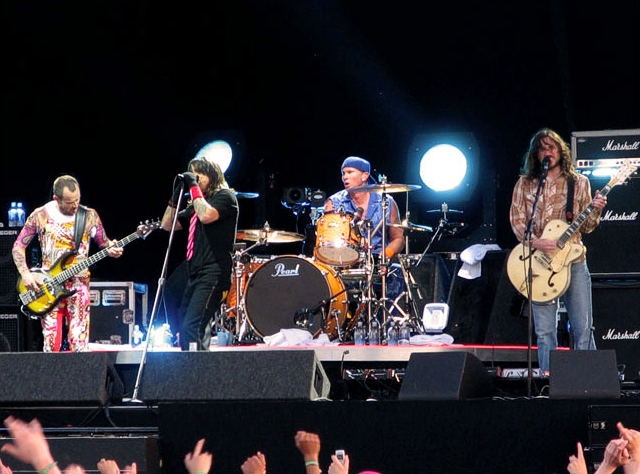
"Can't Stop" by Red Hot Chili Peppers spent four weeks at number one.

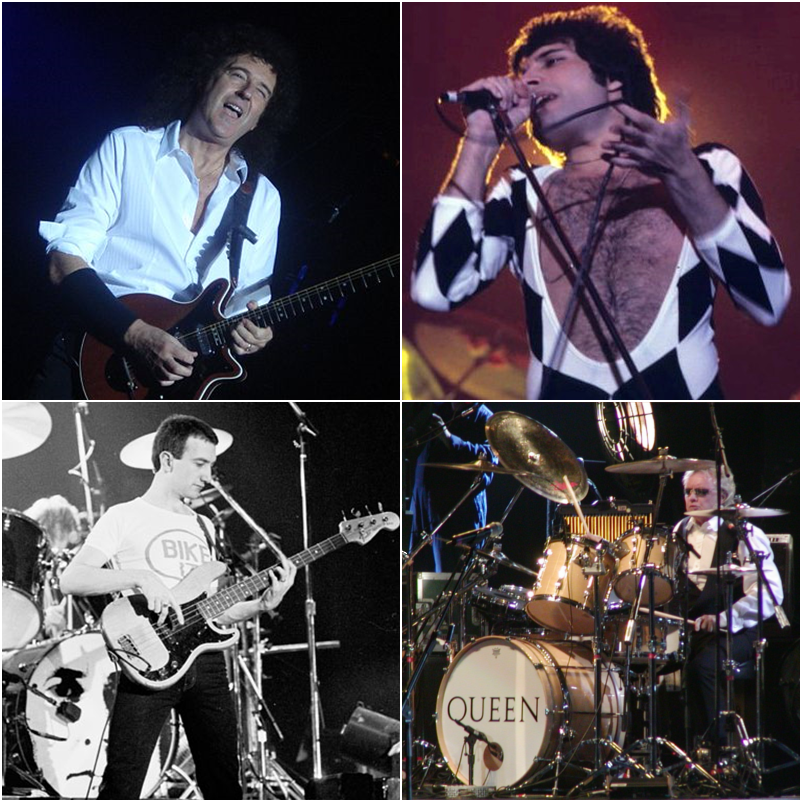
Queen's "Don't Stop Me Now" spent seven weeks of the year at number one.

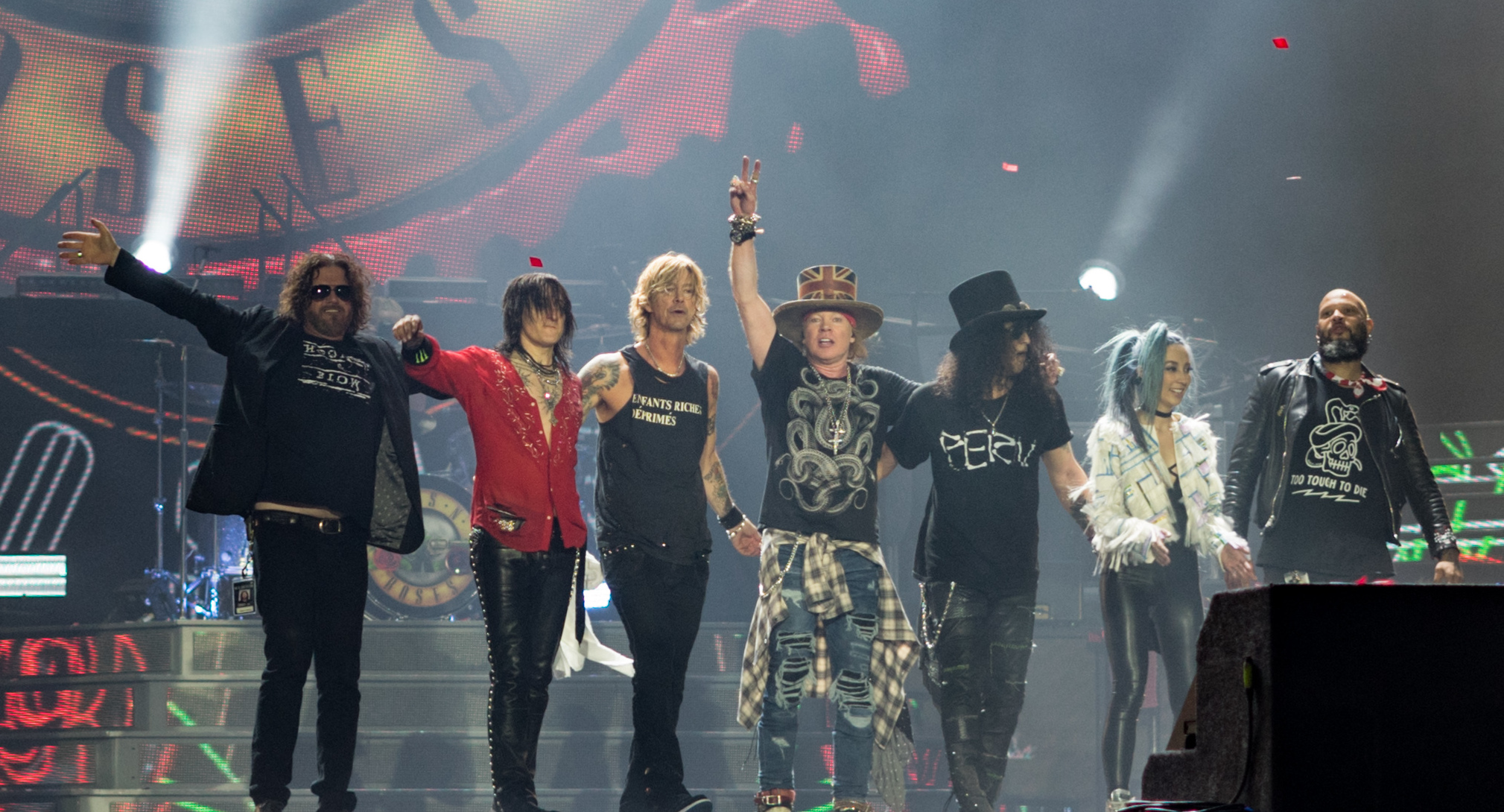
"Sweet Child o' Mine" by American hard rock band Guns N' Roses was number one for four weeks in 2018.

Issue date	Single	Artist(s)	Record label(s)	Ref.
4 January	"Christmas Time (Don't Let the Bells End)"	The Darkness	Must Destroy	
11 January	"Don't Stop Me Now"	Queen	Island	
18 January	"Can't Stop"	Red Hot Chili Peppers	Warner Bros.	
25 January	"Iris"	Goo Goo Dolls	Warner Bros.	
1 February	"Can't Stop"	Red Hot Chili Peppers	Warner Bros.	
8 February	"Can't Stop"	Red Hot Chili Peppers	Warner Bros.	
15 February	"Can't Stop"	Red Hot Chili Peppers	Warner Bros.	
22 February	"Iris"	Goo Goo Dolls	Warner Bros.	
1 March	"Thought Contagion"	Muse	Warner Bros.	
8 March	"Iris"	Goo Goo Dolls	Warner Bros.	
15 March	"Iris"	Goo Goo Dolls	Warner Bros.	
22 March	"Iris"	Goo Goo Dolls	Warner Bros.	
29 March	"Iris"	Goo Goo Dolls	Warner Bros.	
5 April	"Iris"	Goo Goo Dolls	Warner Bros.	
12 April	"Iris"	Goo Goo Dolls	Warner Bros.	
19 April	"Iris"	Goo Goo Dolls	Warner Bros.	
26 April	"Iris"	Goo Goo Dolls	Warner Bros.	
3 May	"Iris"	Goo Goo Dolls	Warner Bros.	
10 May	"Iris"	Goo Goo Dolls	Warner Bros.	
17 May	"Sweet Child o' Mine"	Guns N' Roses	Geffen	
24 May	"Don't Stop Me Now"	Queen	Island	
31 May	"Don't Stop Me Now"	Queen	Island	
7 June	"Don't Stop Me Now"	Queen	Island	
14 June	"Iris"	Goo Goo Dolls	Warner Bros.	
21 June	"Sweet Child o' Mine"	Guns N' Roses	Geffen	
28 June	"Don’t Stop Me Now"	Queen	Island	
5 July	"Sweet Child o' Mine"	Guns N' Roses	Geffen	
12 July	"Sweet Child o' Mine"	Guns N' Roses	Geffen	
19 July	"American Idiot"	Green Day	Warner Bros.	
26 July	"American Idiot"	Green Day	Warner Bros.	
2 August	"Livin' on a Prayer"	Bon Jovi	Mercury	
9 August	"Bohemian Rhapsody"	Queen	Island	
16 August	"Don't Stop Me Now"	Queen	Island	
23 August	"Don't Stop Me Now"	Queen	Island	
30 August	"Mantra"	Bring Me the Horizon	RCA	
6 September	"Mantra"	Bring Me the Horizon	RCA	
13 September	"Mantra"	Bring Me the Horizon	RCA	
20 September	"Bohemian Rhapsody"	Queen	Island	
27 September	"Bohemian Rhapsody"	Queen	Island	
4 October	"Bohemian Rhapsody"	Queen	Island	
11 October	"Bohemian Rhapsody"	Queen	Island	
18 October	"Bohemian Rhapsody"	Queen	Island	
25 October	"Bohemian Rhapsody"	Queen	Island	
1 November	"Bohemian Rhapsody"	Queen	Island	
8 November	"Bohemian Rhapsody"	Queen	Island	
15 November	"Bohemian Rhapsody"	Queen	Island	
22 November	"Bohemian Rhapsody"	Queen	Island	
29 November	"Bohemian Rhapsody"	Queen	Island	
6 December	"Bohemian Rhapsody"	Queen	Island	
13 December	"Bohemian Rhapsody"	Queen	Island	
20 December	"Bohemian Rhapsody"	Queen	Island	
27 December	"Christmas Time (Don't Let the Bells End)"	The Darkness	Must Destroy	

== See also ==
- List of UK Rock & Metal Albums Chart number ones of 2018
