= List of UK Rock & Metal Albums Chart number ones of 2018 =

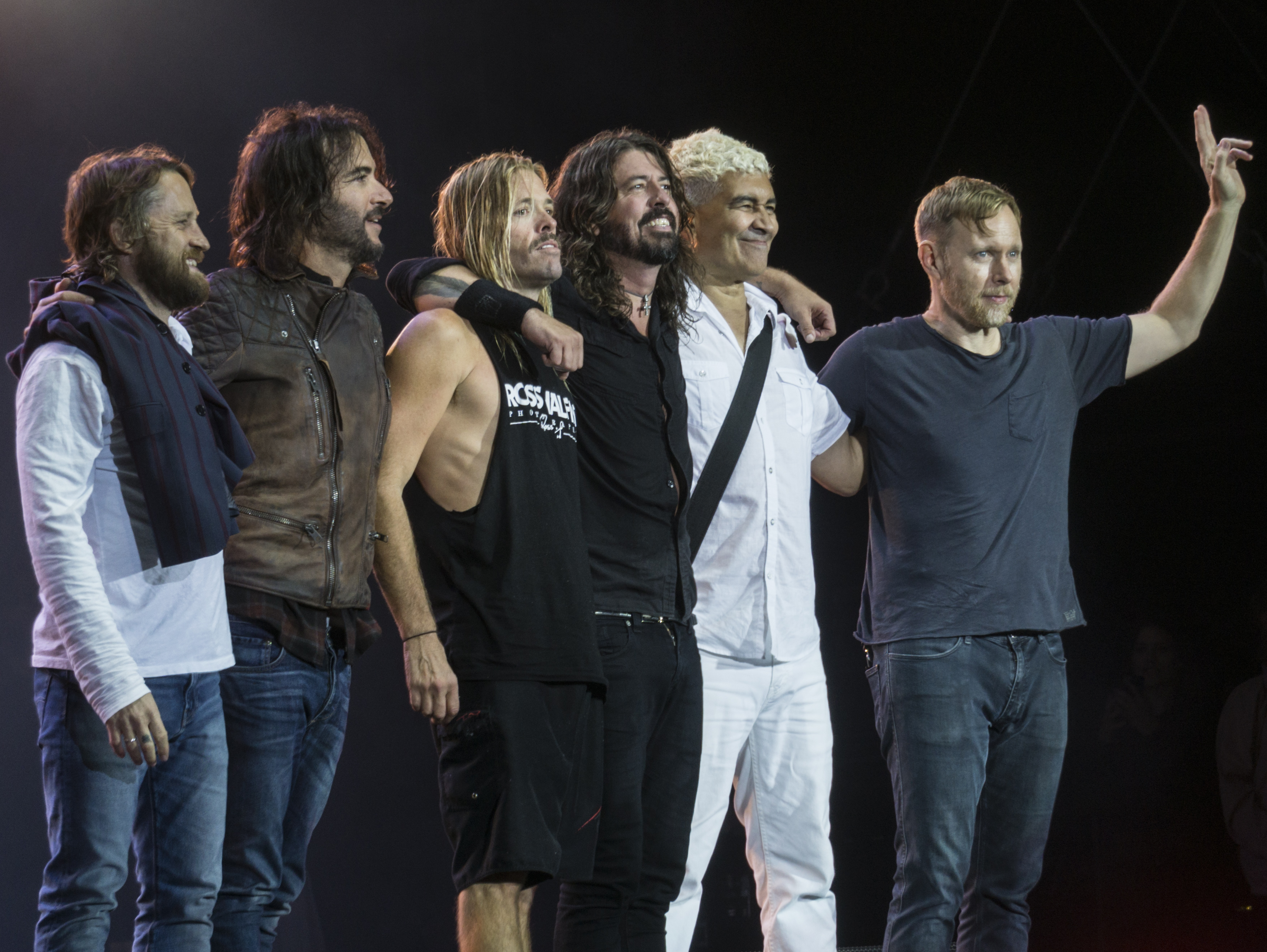
Concrete and Gold by Foo Fighters is the most successful album of 2018 to date, having spent the first three weeks of the year at number one.

The UK Rock & Metal Albums Chart is a record chart which ranks the best-selling rock and heavy metal albums in the United Kingdom. Compiled and published by the Official Charts Company, the data is based on each album's weekly physical sales, digital downloads and streams. In 2018 to date, 20 albums have topped the 25 published charts. The first (and to date most successful) number one of the year was Concrete and Gold, the ninth studio album by American alternative rock band Foo Fighters, which spent the first three weeks of the year atop the chart.

== Chart history ==
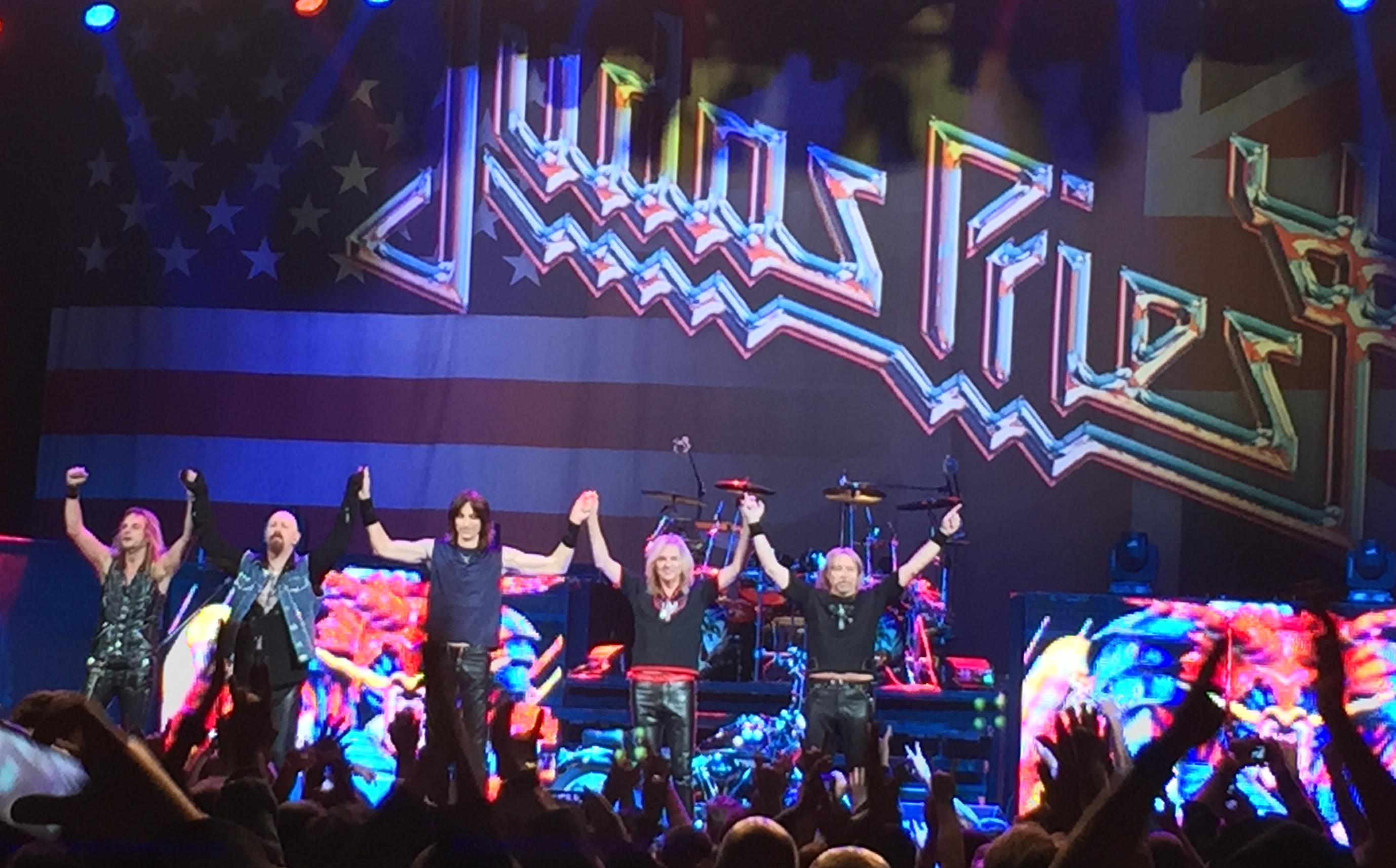
Heavy metal band Judas Priest spent three weeks at number one with their 18th studio album Firepower.

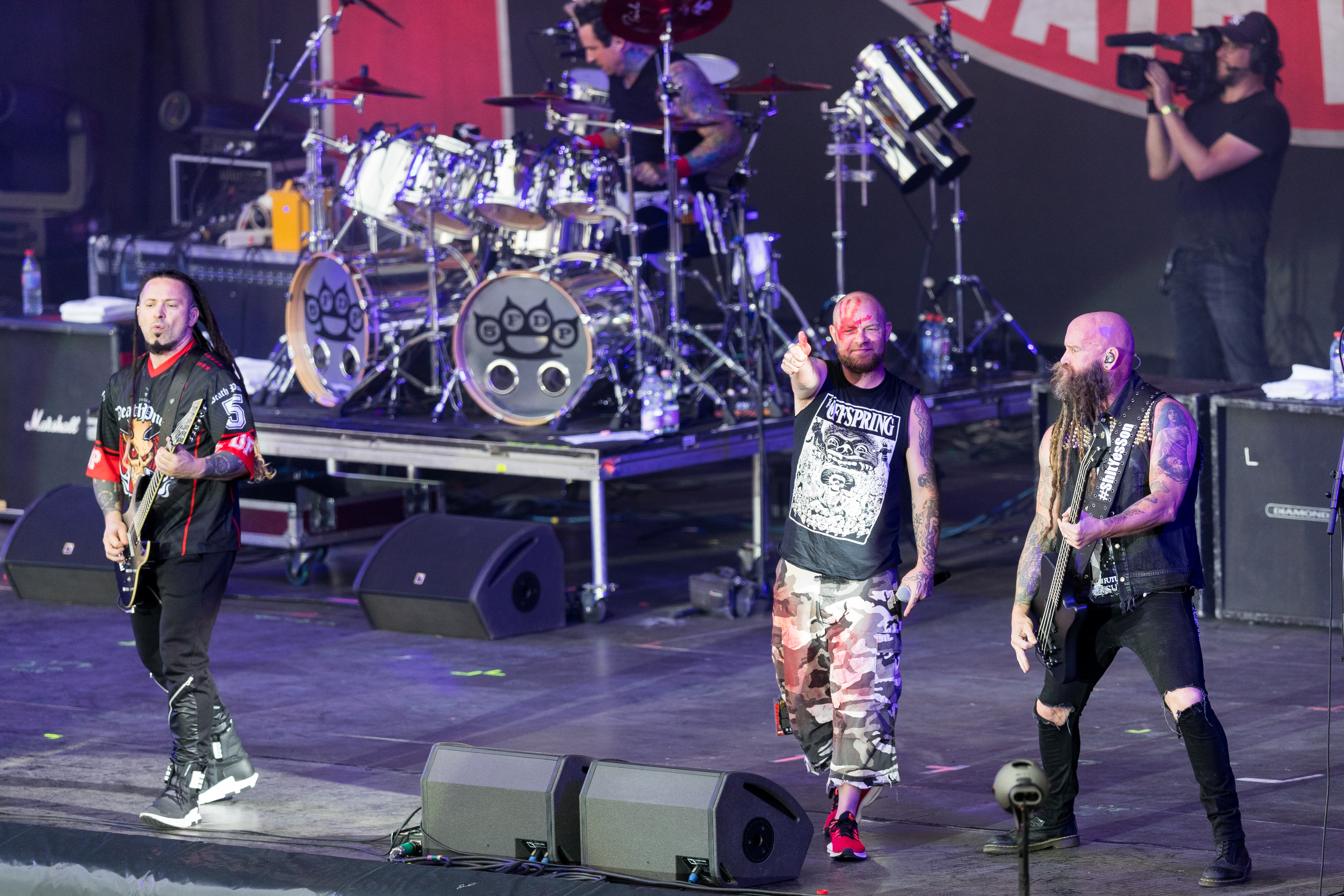
And Justice for None by Five Finger Death Punch has spent two weeks of the year to date at number one.

Issue date	Album	Artist(s)	Record label(s)	Ref.
4 January	Concrete and Gold	Foo Fighters	Columbia	
11 January	Concrete and Gold	Foo Fighters	Columbia	
18 January	Concrete and Gold	Foo Fighters	Columbia	
25 January	Vale	Black Veil Brides	Republic	
1 February	Mania	Fall Out Boy	Def Jam	
8 February	Catharsis	Machine Head	Nuclear Blast	
15 February	Technology	Don Broco	SharpTone	
22 February	Nevermind	Nirvana	Geffen	
1 March	A Deeper Cut	The Temperance Movement	Earache	
8 March	Deadwing	Porcupine Tree	Kscope	
15 March	All Nerve	The Breeders	4AD	
22 March	Firepower	Judas Priest	Columbia	
29 March	Firepower	Judas Priest	Columbia	
5 April	How the West Was Won	Led Zeppelin	Rhino	
12 April	Firepower	Judas Priest	Columbia	
19 April	Find a Light	Blackberry Smoke	Earache	
26 April	The $5.98 E.P. - Garage Days Re-Revisited	Metallica	UMC/Virgin	
3 May	Family Tree	Black Stone Cherry	Mascot	
10 May	Big Tings	Skindred	Napalm	
17 May	Attention Attention	Shinedown	Atlantic	
24 May	Disobey	Bad Wolves	Eleven Seven	
31 May	And Justice for None	Five Finger Death Punch	Eleven Seven	
7 June	And Justice for None	Five Finger Death Punch	Eleven Seven	
14 June	Prequelle	Ghost	Spinefarm	
21 June	A Dying Machine	Tremonti	Napalm	
28 June	Live at Hammersmith	The Darkness	Cooking Vinyl	
5 July	Bad Witch	Nine Inch Nails	Null Corporation	
12 July	Appetite for Destruction	Guns N' Roses	Polydor	
19 July	Appetite for Destruction	Guns N' Roses	Polydor	
26 July	Dare	The Hunna	Null Corporation	
2 August	Appetite for Destruction	Guns N' Roses	Polydor	
9 August	Vicious	Halestorm	Atlantic	
16 August	Vicious	Halestorm	Atlantic	
23 August	Full Nelson	Massive Wagons	Earache	
30 August	Smote reverser	Oh Sees	Castleface	
6 September	Rainier Fog	Alice in Chains	BMG	
13 September	Dissolution	The Pineapple Thief	Kscope	
20 September	Book of Bad Decisions	Clutch	Weather Maker	
27 September	Generation Rx	Good Charlotte	BMG	
4 October	Living the Dream	Slash featuring Myles Kennedy & the Conspirators	Roadrunner	
11 October	Living the Dream	Slash featuring Myles Kennedy & the Conspirators	Roadrunner	
18 October	Vaxis – Act I: The Unheavenly Creatures	Coheed & Cambria	Roadrunner	
25 October	Living the Dream	Slash featuring Myles Kennedy & the Conspirators	Roadrunner	
1 November	Evolution	Disturbed	Reprise	
8 November	Anthem of the Peaceful Army	Greta Van Fleet	EMI	
15 November	...And Justice For All	Metallica	UMC	
22 November	Holy Hell	Architects	Epitaph	
29 November	The Number of the Beast	Iron Maiden	Rhino	
6 December	Clutching at Straws	Marillion	Parlophone	
13 December	Nevermind	Nirvana	Geffen	
20 December	The Dark Side of the Moon	Pink Floyd	Rhino	
27 December	The Dark Side of the Moon	Pink Floyd	Rhino	

== See also ==
- List of UK Rock & Metal Singles Chart number ones of 2018
