= List of UK R&B Albums Chart number ones of 2018 =

The logo of the Official Charts Company, responsible for compiling all of the official music charts in the United Kingdom, including the R&B albums chart.

The UK R&B Albums Chart is a weekly chart, first introduced in October 1994, that ranks the 40 biggest-selling albums that are classified in the R&B genre in the United Kingdom. The chart is compiled by the Official Charts Company, and is based on sales of CDs, downloads, vinyl and other formats over the previous seven days.

The following are the number-one albums of 2018.

== Number-one albums ==
Issue date	Album	Artist(s)	Record label	Ref.
5 January ^{[b]}	Revival	Eminem	Interscope	
12 January ^{[b]}	Revival	Eminem	Interscope	
19 January	Trevor Nelson : Slow Jamz	Various Artists	UMOD	
26 January	Trevor Nelson : Slow Jamz	Various Artists	UMOD	
2 February	The Time Is Now	Craig David	Speakerbox	
9 February	Revival	Eminem	Interscope	
16 February	Diamond in the Dirt	Mist	Sickmade	
23 February	Gang Signs & Prayer	Stormzy	Merky	
2 March	Gang Signs & Prayer	Stormzy	Merky	
9 March	90's Baby	Various Artists	Ministry of Sound	
16 March	Cocoa Sugar	Young Fathers	Ninja Tune	
23 March	?	XXXTentacion	Bad Vibes Forever	
30 March	Sex & Cigarettes	Toni Braxton	Def Jam	
6 April	My Dear Melancholy,	The Weeknd	Republic	
13 April	Geography	Tom Misch	Beyond the Groove	
20 April	My Dear Melancholy,	The Weeknd	Republic	
27 April	KOD	J. Cole	Interscope	
4 May	Beerbongs & Bentleys	Post Malone	Republic	
11 May	Heaven Before All Hell Breaks Loose	Plan B	679	
18 May	Beerbongs & Bentleys	Post Malone	Republic	
25 May	Good Thing	Leon Bridges	Columbia	
1 June	Beerbongs & Bentleys	Post Malone	Republic	
8 June	Ye	Kanye West	Def Jam	
15 June	Lost & Found	Jorja Smith	Famm	
22 June	Everything Is Love	The Carters	RCA/Roc Nation	
29 June	Everything Is Love	The Carters	RCA/Roc Nation	
6 July ^{[a]} ^{[b]}	Scorpion	Drake	Cash Money/Republic	
13 July ^{[a]} ^{[b]}	Scorpion	Drake	Cash Money/Republic	
20 July ^{[a]} ^{[b]}	Scorpion	Drake	Cash Money/Republic	
27 July ^{[b]}	Scorpion	Drake	Cash Money/Republic	
3 August ^{[b]}	Scorpion	Drake	Cash Money/Republic	
10 August ^{[b]}	Scorpion	Drake	Cash Money/Republic	
17 August	Queen	Nicki Minaj	Cash Money/Republic	
24 August	B. Inspired	Bugzy Malone	BSomebody	
31 August	Rap Allstars	Various Artists	UMOD	
7 September ^{[a]} ^{[b]}	Kamikaze	Eminem	Interscope	
14 September ^{[a]}	Kamikaze	Eminem	Interscope	
21 September ^{[a]}	Kamikaze	Eminem	Interscope	
28 September	Piano and a Microphone 1983	Prince	Rhino	
5 October	Kamikaze	Eminem	Interscope	
12 October	Kamikaze	Eminem	Interscope	
19 October	Kamikaze	Eminem	Interscope	
26 October	Kamikaze	Eminem	Interscope	
2 November	Kamikaze	Eminem	Interscope	
9 November	Kamikaze	Eminem	Interscope	
16 November	Kamikaze	Eminem	Interscope	
23 November	Caution	Mariah Carey	Epic	
30 November	Kamikaze	Eminem	Interscope	
7 December	Kamikaze	Eminem	Interscope	
14 December	Kamikaze	Eminem	Interscope	
21 December	Kamikaze	Eminem	Interscope	
28 December	Kamikaze	Eminem	Interscope	

== Notes ==
- ^{a} - The album was simultaneously number-one on the UK Albums Chart.
- ^{b} - The artist was simultaneously number-one on the R&B Singles Chart.

== See also ==
- List of UK Albums Chart number ones of the 2010s
- List of UK R&B Singles Chart number ones of 2018
