= Juno Award for Dance Recording of the Year =

Music award category

The Juno Award for "Dance Recording of the Year" has been awarded since 1990, as recognition each year for the best dance music recording by an artist from Canada. Due to the relatively single-oriented nature of the dance genre, the award is most commonly presented for an individual single or a remix, although it may also be presented for a full album.

At the Juno Awards of 2021, it was announced that a new category for Underground Dance Single of the Year will be created alongside the existing category, and presented for the first time at the Juno Awards of 2022.

== Winners ==
=== Best Dance Recording (1990 – 2002) ===
Year	Winner	Song	Nominees	Ref.
1990	Kon Kan	"I Beg Your Pardon (I Never Promised You a Rose Garden)"	Jam Jam Jam, "Yada Yada"; Maestro Fresh-Wes, "Let Your Backbone Slide"; Candi, "Missing You"; Candi, "Under Your Spell"	
1991	Jane Child	"Don't Wanna Fall In Love (Knife Feel Good Mix)"	Candi & The Backbeat, "The World Keeps on Turning"; Celine Dion, "Unison"; John James, "I Wanna Know"; Kon Kan, Puss 'n Boots (These Boots are Made for Walkin')	
1992	Bootsauce	"Everyone's a Winner (Chocolate Movement Mix)"	Candi & The Backbeat, "Good Together (Wicked Mix)"; Love & Sas, "I Don't Need Yo Kiss (The 12 Inch Mix)"; Debbie Johnson, "I'll Respect You (Club Mix)"; Alanis, "Too Hot (Hott Shot Mix)"	
1993	Celine Dion	"Love Can Move Mountains (Club Mix)"	Banned in the UK, "C'mon and Get My Love (House Techno Remix)"; Love & Sas, "Don't Stop Now (Prohibition Club Mix)"; Lisa Lougheed, "Love Vibe (Love Vibe Club Mix)"; Lisa Lougheed, "World Love (Lisa Love House Mix)"	
1994	Red Light featuring David Gordon	"Thankful (Raw Club Mix)"	Oval Emotion, "Don't Make Me Wait"; BKS, "I'm in Love with You"; West End Girls, "R U Sexin' Me"; Lisa Lougheed, "Won't Give Up My Music"	
1995	Capital Sound	"Higher Love (Club Mix)"	Jann Arden, "Could I Be Your Girl"; Capital Sound, "In the Night"; Temperance, "Music Is My Life"; West End Girls, "Pure (You're Touching Me)"	
1996	Camille	"A Deeper Shade of Love (Extended Mix)"	JLM, "Come Into My Life (Extended Mix)"; Shauna Davis, "Get Away (Stonebridge and Nick Nice Club Mix)"; Temperance, "Never Let You Go (Tempered Club Mix)"; BKS, "Take Control (Matrix Airplay Edit)"	
1997	BKS	"Astroplane (City of Love Mix)"	Laya, "All My Dreams (Don't Ever Leave) (Extended Skywalkers Mix)"; Temperance, "Forever Young (Tempered Club Mix)"; Paul Jacobs, "Happy Days"; Emjay, "In Your Arms"	
1998	Delerium	"Euphoria (Rabbit in the Moon Mix)"	Ivan, "The Spell"; Joee, "Angel (Angelic Radio Mix)"; Paul Jacobs, "Move Ya Feet"; Temperance, "Universal Dream (Telluric Club Mix)"	
1999	Love Inc.	"Broken Bones"	Temperance, Hands of Time; Jacynthe, I Got What It Takes; The Boomtang Boys, Popcorn; Shauna Davis, Try My Love	
2000	Delerium	"Silence"	Joee, Arriba; Temperance, Dancing in the Key of Love; Emjay, Over and Over, Steve Austin, The Rush Won't Stop	
2001	Love Inc.	"Into the Night"	Max Graham, Airtight; Temperance, If You Don't Know; Sarina Paris, Look at Us; Big Bass featuring Michelle Narine, What You Do	
2002	Hatiras	"Spaced Invader"	Deborah Cox, "Absolutely Not"; Delerium, "Innocente"; The Underdog Project, "It Doesn't Matter"; Elissa, "The Light"	

=== Dance Recording of the Year (2003 - Present) ===
Year	Winner	Album	Nominees	Ref.
2003	The Sound Bluntz	"Billie Jean"	Boomtang, Wet; Grand Menage, Tribalmania; MC Mario, "Freak the Funk"; Original 3 featuring Corey Hart, "Sunglasses At Night 2002"	
2004	The Sound Bluntz	"Something About You"	Audrey, "I Know"; Delerium, Chimera; MC Mario, "All That I Like"; Original 3, "Give You Love"	
2005	Widelife with Simone Denny	"All Things (Just Keep Getting Better)"	Aluna, "All of My Life"; DJ's Rule, "Feel Love"; Original 3, "Ghetto Love (Extended Original Version)"; Hatiras, "Money Shot"	
2006	Hatiras & Macca featuring Shawna B	"Spanish Fly"	Skunk, "Hot Box Da", M1, "Robopop"; Boza, "She’s Looking Good"; Ray Charles vs Dio, "Walkin & Talkin"	
2007	Tiga	Sexor	Danny D, "Airbreak"; Taras, "Lift Off"; The Sound Bluntz, "(Maybe You'll Get) Lucky"; Champion, The Remix Album	
2008	Deadmau5	"All U Ever Want"	Melleefresh vs. Deadmau5, After Hours; Nick Fiorucci, Every Time You Move; Chromeo, Fancy Footwork; Hatiras, Poppin’ Beats	
2009	Deadmau5	Random Album Title	James Doman, "Everything’s Gonna Be Alright"; Hatiras and MC Flipside, "Get Blahsted"; Deadmau5 vs. Kaskade, "Move For Me"; House Music United, "Yes We Can"	
2010	Deadmau5	For Lack of a Better Name	Misstress Barbara, I'm No Human; Doman and Gooding with Dru and Lincoln, "Runnin"; Carmen and Camille, "Shine 4U"; Thunderheist, Thunderheist	
2011	Deadmau5	"Sofi Needs a Ladder"	Chromeo, Business Casual; Dragonette, Fixin to Thrill; Mia Martina and Edward Maya, "Stereo Love"; Keshia Chanté, "Table Dancer"	
2012	Martin Solveig and Dragonette	"Hello"	Anjulie, "Brand New Chick"; Deadmau5, "Aural Psynapse"; Duck Sauce, "Barbra Streisand"; Mia Martina, Devotion	
2013	Anjulie	"You and I"	Felix Cartal, "Don’t Turn on the Lights" (featuring Polina); Vita Chambers, "Fix You"; André, "We Dance"; Dragonette, Bodyparts	
2014	Armin van Buuren and Trevor Guthrie	"This Is What It Feels Like"	deadmau5, > album title goes here <; DVBBS & Borgeous, "Tsunami"; Jacynthe, "Locked Down"; Mia Martina, "Heartbreaker"	
2015	Kiesza	Sound of a Woman	Adventure Club, Calling All Heroes; Chromeo, White Women; Glenn Morrison, "Goodbye"; Trevor Guthrie, "Soundwave"	
2016	Keys N Krates	Save Me	A-Trak, "We All Fall Down" feat. Jamie Lidell; Autoerotique & Max Styler, "Badman (Torro Torro Remix)"; Borgeous & Lights, "Zero Gravity"; Sleepy Tom & Diplo, "Be Right There"	
2017	Bit Funk	Off The Ground	Adventure Club, "Limitless" feat. Delaney Jane; Zeds Dead, Northern Lights; Shaun Frank, "Let You Get Away" feat. Ashe; Jacques Greene, "You Can't Deny"	
2018	Nick Fiorucci feat. Laurell	"Closer"	DVBBS feat. Gia Koko and CMC$, "Not Going Home"; Felix Cartal, "Get What You Give"; KAPRI, "Deeper"; Sultan & Shepard (featuring Nadia Ali and IRO), "Almost Home"	
2019	Loud Luxury	"Body"	Azari, "Gotasoul"; Dzeko and Tiësto, "Jackie Chan" feat. Preme and Post Malone; Jacques Greene, "Avatar Beach"; Keys N Krates, "Cura"	
2020	Felix Cartal and Lights	"Love Me"	Loud Luxury and Bryce Vine, "I'm Not Alright"; Ralph, "Gravity"; Sultan & Shepard feat. Showtek, "We Found Love"; Frank Walker feat. Astrid S, "Only When It Rains"	
2021	Kaytranada	Bubba	Felix Cartal and Sophie Simmons, MINE; Rezz X Grabbitz, Someone Else; So Sus, Voices; Frank Walker, Dancing in the Dark	
2022	Kaytranada	"Caution"	Ceréna, "see"; DVBBS, "Sleep"; Karl Wolf, "Get Away (Radio Edit)"; Rezz and deadmau5, "Hypnocurrency"	
2023	Rêve	"Ctrl + Alt + Del"	Bob Moses feat. Kasablanca, "Afterglow"; Grimes, "Shinigami Eyes"; Loud Luxury feat. Kiddo, "These Nights"; Rezz, "Spiral"	
2024	Felix Cartal and Karen Harding	"Need Your Love"	Dom Dolla and Nelly Furtado, "Eat Your Man"; DVBBS, Jeremih and Sk8, "Crew Thang"; Loud Luxury and DVBBS feat. Kane Brown, "Next to You"; Frank Walker feat. Ella Henderson, "I Go Dancing"	
2025	Interplanetary Criminal feat. SadBoi	"No Time"	DijahSB, "Uh Huh"; Rezz, Virtual Riot feat. One True God, "Give in to you"; So Sus, "Call Me When"; Wawa, "Foul Taste"	
2026	Debby Friday	Bet on Me	A-Trak, Loving You; Anna Sofia, Do What I Want; Felix Cartal, I, Sabotage; Chyl, Dominate	
