= List of RPM number-one dance singles of 1998 =

These are the RPM magazine Dance number-one hits of 1998.

== Chart history ==
Issue date	Song	Artist	Reference(s)
January 12	"Feel So Good" (featuring Kelly Price)	Mase	
January 19	"Feel So Good" (featuring Kelly Price)	Mase	
January 26	"Angel"	Joée	
February 2	"Gettin' Jiggy wit It"	Will Smith	
February 9	"Broken Bones"	Love Inc.	
February 16	"Broken Bones"	Love Inc.	
February 23	"Together Again"	Janet Jackson	
March 2	"Gettin' Jiggy wit It"	Will Smith	
March 9	"Broken Bones"	Love Inc.	
March 16	"Beachball"	Nalin & Kane	
March 23	"Beachball"	Nalin & Kane	
March 30	"Beachball"	Nalin & Kane	
April 6	"Beachball"	Nalin & Kane	
April 13	"Ecuador"	Sash!	
April 20	"Ecuador"	Sash!	
April 27	"Lift Me Up"	Red 5	
May 4	"Ecuador"	Sash!	
May 11	"Ecuador"	Sash!	
May 18	"I Know Where It's At"	All Saints	
May 25	"I Know Where It's At"	All Saints	
June 1	"No No No"	Destiny's Child	
June 8	"On the Run"	De Bos	
June 15	"Too Close"	Next	
June 22	"Too Close"	Next	
June 29	"Too Close"	Next	
July 6	"Stay"	Sash!	
July 13	"Stay"	Sash!	
July 20	"Stay"	Sash!	
July 27	"The Boy Is Mine"	Brandy & Monica	
August 3	"The Boy Is Mine"	Brandy & Monica	
August 10	"You're a Superstar"	Love Inc.	
August 17	"You're a Superstar"	Love Inc.	
August 24	"You're a Superstar"	Love Inc.	
August 31	"You're a Superstar"	Love Inc.	
September 7	"You're a Superstar"	Love Inc.	
September 14	"Hands of Time"	Temperance	
September 21	"Feel It"	The Tamperer featuring Maya	
September 28	"Top of the World" (featuring Mase)	Brandy	
October 5	"Top of the World" (featuring Mase)	Brandy	
October 12	"God is a DJ"	Faithless	
October 19	"God is a DJ"	Faithless	
October 26	"If You Could Read My Mind"	Stars on 54	
November 2	"If You Could Read My Mind"	Stars on 54	
November 9	"If You Could Read My Mind"	Stars on 54	
November 16	"If You Could Read My Mind"	Stars on 54	
November 23	"If You Could Read My Mind"	Stars on 54	
November 30	"Wanna Get Up"	2 Unlimited	
December 7	"Wanna Get Up"	2 Unlimited	
December 14	"Homeless"	Love Inc.	

== See also ==
- 1998 in Canadian music
- List of RPM number-one dance singles chart (Canada)
