= List of RPM number-one dance singles of 2000 =

These are the RPM magazine Dance number one hits of 2000. The chart ceased publication in November 2000 and the final published chart was November 6, 2000.

== Chart history ==
Issue date	Song	Artist	Reference(s)
January 10	"Sun Is Shining"	Bob Marley vs. Funkstar De Luxe	
January 17	"Better Off Alone"	Alice DeeJay	
January 24	"Get Get Down"	Paul Johnson	
January 31	"Better Off Alone"	Alice DeeJay	
February 7	"Sun Is Shining"	Bob Marley vs. Funkstar De Luxe	
February 14	"Sun Is Shining"	Bob Marley vs. Funkstar De Luxe	
February 21	"Get Get Down"	Paul Johnson	
February 28	"Better Off Alone"	Alice DeeJay	
March 6	"Don't Call Me Baby"	Madison Avenue	
March 13	"Move Your Body"	Eiffel 65	
March 20	"Don't Call Me Baby"	Madison Avenue	
March 27	"Don't Call Me Baby"	Madison Avenue	
April 3	"Don't Call Me Baby"	Madison Avenue	
April 10	"Fly Away (Bye Bye)"	Eyes Cream	
April 17	"Fly Away (Bye Bye)"	Eyes Cream	
April 24	"Fly Away (Bye Bye)"	Eyes Cream	
May 1	"Fly Away (Bye Bye)"	Eyes Cream	
May 8	"Fly Away (Bye Bye)"	Eyes Cream	
May 15	"My Feeling"	Junior Jack	
May 22	"My Feeling"	Junior Jack	
May 29	"My Feeling"	Junior Jack	
June 5	"My Feeling"	Junior Jack	
June 12	"My Feeling"	Junior Jack	
June 19	"My Feeling"	Junior Jack	
June 26	"He Wasn't Man Enough"	Toni Braxton	
July 3	"My Feeling"	Junior Jack	
July 10	"He Wasn't Man Enough"	Toni Braxton	
July 17	"He Wasn't Man Enough"	Toni Braxton	
July 24	"You See the Trouble with Me"	Black Legend	
July 31	"You See the Trouble with Me"	Black Legend	
August 7	"You See the Trouble with Me"	Black Legend	
August 14	"You See the Trouble with Me"	Black Legend	
August 21	"I Got This Feeling"	Baby Bumps	
August 28	"I Got This Feeling"	Baby Bumps	
September 4	"I Got This Feeling"	Baby Bumps	
September 11	"Kernkraft 400"	Zombie Nation	
September 18	"Kernkraft 400"	Zombie Nation	
September 25	"Kernkraft 400"	Zombie Nation	
October 2	"Kernkraft 400"	Zombie Nation	
October 9	"Here Comes the Sunshine"	Love Inc.	
October 16	"Here Comes the Sunshine"	Love Inc.	

== See also ==
- List of RPM number-one dance singles chart (Canada)
