= List of RPM number-one dance singles of 1994 =

These are the RPM magazine Dance number one hits of 1994.

== Chart history ==
Issue date	Song	Artist	Reference(s)
January 10	"Dreams"	Gabrielle	
January 17	"Give It Up"	The Goodmen	
January 24	"Got to Get It"	Culture Beat	
January 31	"Life"	Haddaway	
February 7	"Life"	Haddaway	
February 14	"Life"	Haddaway	
February 21	"I Love Music"	Rozalla	
February 28	"I Love Music"	Rozalla	
March 7	"I Love Music"	Rozalla	
March 14	"Been a Long Time"	The Fog	
March 21	"Another Night"	M.C. Sar & The Real McCoy	
March 28	"Another Night"	M.C. Sar & The Real McCoy	
April 4	"Another Night"	M.C. Sar & The Real McCoy	
April 11	"The Sign"	Ace of Base	
April 18	"The Sign"	Ace of Base	
April 25	"What's Up"	Minnesota	
May 2	"I Like to Move It"	Reel 2 Real	
May 9	"I Like to Move It"	Reel 2 Real	
May 16	"I Like to Move It"	Reel 2 Real	
May 23	"Joy"	Staxx of Joy	
May 30	"Joy"	Staxx of Joy	
June 6	"I Like to Move It"	Reel 2 Real	
June 13	"Hey Everybody"	DJ Company	
June 20	"Hey Everybody"	DJ Company	
June 27	"Moving on Up"	M People	
July 4	"Moving on Up"	M People	
July 11	"Moving on Up"	M People	
July 18	"Moving on Up"	M People	
July 25	"Moving on Up"	M People	
August 1	"Moving on Up"	M People	
August 8	"The Color of My Dreams"	B.G., the Prince of Rap	
August 15	"The Color of My Dreams"	B.G., the Prince of Rap	
August 22	"The Color of My Dreams"	B.G., the Prince of Rap	
August 29	"The Color of My Dreams"	B.G., the Prince of Rap	
September 5	"Tree Frog"	Hope	
September 12	"Right in the Night"	Jam & Spoon	
September 19	"Running Up That Hill"	Elastic Band	
September 26	"Go On Move"	Reel 2 Real	
October 3	"Do You Wanna Get Funky"	C+C Music Factory	
October 10	"Do You Wanna Get Funky"	C+C Music Factory	
October 17	"Do You Wanna Get Funky"	C+C Music Factory	
October 24	"Do You Wanna Get Funky"	C+C Music Factory	
October 31	"Sweet Dreams"	La Bouche	
November 7	"Sweet Dreams"	La Bouche	
November 14	"Saturday Night"	Whigfield	
November 21	"Saturday Night"	Whigfield	
November 28	"Eighteen Strings"	Tinman	
December 5	"Eighteen Strings"	Tinman	
December 12	"Close to You"	Fun Factory	
December 19	"Close to You"	Fun Factory	

== See also ==
- List of RPM number-one dance singles chart (Canada)
