= List of RPM number-one dance singles of 1996 =

These are the RPM magazine Dance number one hits of 1996.

== Chart history ==
| Issue date | Song | Artist | Reference(s) |
|---|---|---|---|
| January 8 | "Magic Carpet Ride" | Mighty Dub Katz | |
| January 15 | "Everybody Be Somebody" | Ruffneck | |
| January 22 | "El Tiburón" | Proyecto Uno | |
| January 29 | "Beautiful Life" | Ace of Base | |
| February 5 | "Missing" | Everything but the Girl | |
| February 12 | "Missing" | Everything but the Girl | |
| February 19 | "Missing" | Everything but the Girl | |
| February 26 | "Sexual Healing" | Max-A-Million | |
| March 4 | "Sexual Healing" | Max-A-Million | |
| March 11 | "Love is Paradise" | First Base | |
| March 18 | "Love is Paradise" | First Base | |
| March 25 | "California Love" | 2 Pac | |
| April 1 | "California Love" | 2 Pac | |
| April 8 | "California Love" | 2 Pac | |
| April 15 | "Feels So Good" | Lina Santiago | |
| April 22 | "My Radio" | J.K. | |
| April 29 | "Disco's Revenge" | Gusto | |
| May 6 | "Disco's Revenge" | Gusto | |
| May 13 | "Crying in the Rain" | Culture Beat | |
| May 20 | "Give Me Luv" | Alcatraz | |
| May 27 | "Killing Me Softly" | The Fugees | |
| June 3 | "Killing Me Softly" | The Fugees | |
| June 10 | "Killing Me Softly" | The Fugees | |
| June 17 | "Killing Me Softly" | The Fugees | |
| June 24 | "Children" | Robert Miles | |
| July 1 | "Children" | Robert Miles | |
| July 8 | "Children" | Robert Miles | |
| July 15 | "Children" | Robert Miles | |
| July 22 | "Children" | Robert Miles | |
| July 29 | "Wrong" | Everything but the Girl | |
| August 5 | "I'll Be Alright" | MTS | |
| August 12 | "I'll Be Alright" | MTS | |
| August 19 | "I'll Be Alright" | MTS | |
| August 26 | "One More Try" | Kristine W | |
| September 2 | "One More Try" | Kristine W | |
| September 9 | "Where Do You Go" | No Mercy | |
| September 16 | "That Girl" | Maxi Priest | |
| September 23 | "You're Makin' Me High" | Toni Braxton | |
| September 30 | "Sunshine" | Umboza | |
| October 7 | "Hit Me Off" | New Edition | |
| October 14 | "Hit Me Off" | New Edition | |
| October 21 | "Hit Me Off" | New Edition | |
| October 28 | "Keep Pushin'" | Boris Dlugosch | |
| November 4 | "Keep Pushin'" | Boris Dlugosch | |
| November 11 | "Keep Pushin'" | Boris Dlugosch | |
| November 18 | "No Diggity" (featuring Dr. Dre & Queen Pen) | Blackstreet | |
| November 25 | "The Funk Phenomena" | Armand Van Helden | |
| December 2 | "The Funk Phenomena" | Armand Van Helden | |
| December 9 | "The Funk Phenomena" | Armand Van Helden | |
| December 16 | "Fired Up!" | Funky Green Dogs | |

== See also ==
- List of RPM number-one dance singles chart (Canada)
