= List of RPM number-one dance singles of 1997 =

These are the RPM magazine Dance number one hits of 1997.

== Chart history ==
Issue date	Song	Artist	Reference(s)
January 13	"Jellyhead"	Crush	
January 20	"Jellyhead"	Crush	
January 27	"Jellyhead"	Crush	
February 3	"Jellyhead"	Crush	
February 10	"Wannabe"	Spice Girls	
February 17	"Wannabe"	Spice Girls	
February 24	"Wannabe"	Spice Girls	
March 3	"Return of the Mack"	Mark Morrison	
March 10	"Return of the Mack"	Mark Morrison	
March 17	"Return of the Mack"	Mark Morrison	
March 24	"Return of the Mack"	Mark Morrison	
March 31	"Discothèque"	U2	
April 7	"Discothèque"	U2	
April 14	"Insomnia"	Faithless	
April 21	"Insomnia"	Faithless	
April 28	"Insomnia"	Faithless	
May 5	"Insomnia"	Faithless	
May 12	"Hypnotize"	The Notorious B.I.G.	
May 19	"Hypnotize"	The Notorious B.I.G.	
May 26	"Hypnotize"	The Notorious B.I.G.	
June 2	"Da Funk"	Daft Punk	
June 9	"One More Time"	Real McCoy	
June 16	"Da' Dip"	Freak Nasty	
June 23	"Da' Dip"	Freak Nasty	
June 30	"Call Me"	Le Click	
July 7	"Call Me"	Le Click	
July 14	"Call Me"	Le Click	
July 21	"Around the World"	Daft Punk	
July 28	"Around the World"	Daft Punk	
August 4	"I'll Be Missing You" (featuring Faith Evans & 112)	Puff Daddy	
August 11	"I'll Be Missing You" (featuring Faith Evans & 112)	Puff Daddy	
August 18	"Around the World"	Daft Punk	
August 25	"Men in Black"	Will Smith	
September 1	"Can You Keep a Secret"	First Base	
September 8	"Do You Know (What It Takes)"	Robyn	
September 15	"I'll Be Missing You" (featuring Faith Evans & 112)	Puff Daddy	
September 22	"Mo Money Mo Problems"	The Notorious B.I.G.	
September 29	"Barbie Girl"	Aqua	
October 6	"Barbie Girl"	Aqua	
October 13	"Barbie Girl"	Aqua	
October 20	"Honey (Remix)"	Mariah Carey	
October 27	"Get Ready to Bounce"	Brooklyn Bounce	
November 3	"Honey (Remix)"	Mariah Carey	
November 10	"Got 'til It's Gone"	Janet Jackson	
November 17	"Got 'til It's Gone"	Janet Jackson	
November 24	"You Make Me Wanna..."	Usher	
December 1	"Feel So Good"	Mase	
December 8	"Feel So Good"	Mase	
December 15	"Phenomenon"	LL Cool J	

== See also ==
- 1997 in Canadian music
- List of RPM number-one dance singles chart (Canada)
