= Simone Denny =

Canadian singer and songwriter

- Born: Simone Andrea Denny
- Occupation: Singer
- Website: www.simonedenny.com

Simone Andrea Denny is a Canadian singer and songwriter. She is best known as a vocalist with the dance music groups, BKS, Love Inc. and Widelife, appearing most prominently on the hit dance singles "Broken Bones", "You're a Superstar", and "All Things (Just Keep Getting Better)".

== Background ==
Born and raised in Toronto, her parents are of Guyanese heritage. She discovered her passion for music while competing in a talent show in grade six, later training as an opera singer but choosing instead to pursue pop music. She quickly developed a following in local bands, landed the role of Mama in the Canadian production of Mama, I Want to Sing! opposite Deborah Cox, and performed as a backing vocalist for artists such as Maestro Fresh Wes and Devon.

After meeting DJ Chris Sheppard, she contributed as a guest vocalist to several songs by his band BKS, as well as the songs "Tonight It's Party Time" and "I Can't Take the Heartbreak" by Barry Harris and Rachid Wehbi's group Outta Control (a.k.a. Killer Bunnies).

== Love Inc. ==
In 1997, Sheppard and Brad Daymond formed Love Inc., in which Denny was a full member. They released their self-titled debut album in 1998; the album spawned the chart hits "Broken Bones" and "You're a Superstar", with the former song winning the Juno Award for Dance Recording of the Year at the Juno Awards of 1999, and became the first dance music album by Canadian artists ever to receive platinum certification for Canadian sales.

Despite the band's initial success, the 2000 followup album Into the Night was more poorly received, performing poorly on the charts and containing only one noteworthy hit single, although the band did again win the Juno for Dance Recording of the Year at the Juno Awards of 2001, and critics praised Denny's vocals as the best thing about an otherwise weak album. In this era, Sheppard was also beginning to develop a reputation for egotism: in early 2001, Denny had to back out of a previously-unannounced surprise appearance as a special guest who would perform several live songs at one of Sheppard's DJ shows at a dance club in Regina, Saskatchewan. The club cancelled the show outright since it considered Denny to be the real star of the event, but Sheppard tried to use legal threats to force the club to pay him anyway.

The band did not release any further recordings, and broke up after Into the Night, with Denny attributing the breakup to Sheppard mistreating her because he felt like he was the true creative force behind the band even though Denny was generally considered its star. Denny later noted that she had remained on friendlier terms with Daymond right up until his death in 2018.

== Widelife and solo career ==
Denny then began collaborating with Widelife, performing on that band's singles "I Don't Want You" and "All Things (Just Keep Getting Better)", the latter of which was best known as the theme song to the original version of Queer Eye.

In 2005, she released "Cliché", the first single on which she was directly credited as a solo performer. She subsequently appeared as a featured vocalist on several other dance singles before finally releasing her own full-length debut album, The Stereo Dynamite Sessions, Vol. 1, in 2015.

In 2020, Denny appeared on CBC Television's New Year's Eve special, performing "You're a Superstar" with Tyler Shaw. She has also continued to perform live shows, notably as part of an Electric Circus reunion bill of dance acts from the 1990s and 2000s.

In 2024, she released a country rendition of "You're a Superstar".

== Discography ==
Studio albums

| Title | Details | Peak chart positions | Certifications |
| Title | Details | CAN | Certifications |
|---|---|---|---|
| Love Inc. | Release date: 1998; Label: BMG Music Canada; Formats: CD | 33 | MC: Platinum |
| Into the Night | Release date: August 29, 2000; Label: BMG Music Canada; Formats: CD | 46 | |
| The Stereo Dynamite Sessions, Vol. 1 | Release date: 2015; Label: Stereo Dynamite/Universal Music; Formats: CD | — | |

Singles

| Year | Single | Peak chart positions | | | | | | Album |
| Year | Single | CAN | CAN Dance | AUS | NED | UK | US Dance | Album |
| 1997 | "Broken Bones" | 23 | 1 | 52 | — | 8 | — | Love Inc. |
| 1998 | "You're a Superstar" | 13 | 1 | 57 | 23 | 7 | 22 | Love Inc. |
| 1998 | "Homeless" | 21 | 1 | — | — | — | — | Love Inc. |
| 1999 | "Who Do U Love" | 18 | 1 | — | — | — | — | Love Inc. |
| 2000 | "Come On (It's Only Love)" | — | — | — | — | — | — | Into the Night |
| 2000 | "Here Comes the Sunshine" | 14 | 1 | — | — | — | — | Into the Night |
| 2000 | "Into the Night" | — | — | — | — | 39 | — | Into the Night |
| 2015 | "Cliché" | — | — | — | — | — | — | |
| 2024 | "Superstar (Country Version)" | — | — | — | — | — | — | |
"—" denotes releases that did not chart
