= Rhythm of Love =

Rhythm of Love may refer to:

== Albums ==
- Rhythm of Love (Anita Baker album) or its title song (1994)
- Rhythm of Love (Kylie Minogue album) or its title song (1990)
- Rhythm of Love, a 1997 album by DJ Company or its title song

== Songs ==
- "Rhythm of Love" (DJ Company song) (1994)
- "Rhythm of Love" (Alyona Lanskaya song) (2012)
- "Rhythm of Love" (Plain White T's song) (2010)
- "Rhythm of Love" (Scorpions song) (1988)
- "Rhythm of Love" (Yes song) (1987)
- "Rhythm of Love", a 2014 song by Danity Kane from DK3
- "Rhythm of Love", a 1990 song by Krokus from Stampede
