= List of RPM number-one dance singles of 1995 =

These are the RPM magazine Dance number one hits of 1995.

== Chart history ==
Issue date	Song	Artist	Reference(s)
January 16	"Can You Feel It"	Reel 2 Real	
January 23	"Here Comes the Hotstepper"	Ini Kamoze	
January 30	"La La La Hey Hey"	The Outhere Brothers	
February 6	"Everybody on the Floor (Pump It)"	Tokyo Ghetto Pussy	
February 13	"Everybody on the Floor (Pump It)"	Tokyo Ghetto Pussy	
February 20	"Everybody on the Floor (Pump It)"	Tokyo Ghetto Pussy	
February 27	"Everybody on the Floor (Pump It)"	Tokyo Ghetto Pussy	
March 6	"Everybody on the Floor (Pump It)"	Tokyo Ghetto Pussy	
March 13	"Cotton-Eyed Joe"	Rednex	
March 20	"You & I"	J.K.	
March 27	"Touch the Sky"	Cartouche	
April 3	"Touch the Sky"	Cartouche	
April 10	"Touch the Sky"	Cartouche	
April 17	"Touch the Sky"	Cartouche	
April 24	"Touch the Sky"	Cartouche	
May 1	"Touch the Sky"	Cartouche	
May 8	"Love Is All Around"	DJ BoBo	
May 15	"Love Is All Around"	DJ BoBo	
May 22	"Headbone Connected"	Daisy Dee	
May 29	"Headbone Connected"	Daisy Dee	
June 5	"This Is How We Do It"	Montell Jordan	
June 12	"This Is How We Do It"	Montell Jordan	
June 19	"Baby Baby"	Corona	
June 26	"Baby Baby"	Corona	
July 3	"Baby Baby"	Corona	
July 10	"In My Dreams"	Darkness	
July 17	"In My Dreams"	Darkness	
July 24	"Boom Boom Boom"	The Outhere Brothers	
July 31	"Boom Boom Boom"	The Outhere Brothers	
August 7	"Total Eclipse of the Heart"	Nicki French	
August 14	"Total Eclipse of the Heart"	Nicki French	
August 21	"Be My Lover"	La Bouche	
August 28	"Scatman (Ski Ba Bop Ba Dop Bop)"	Scatman John	
September 4	"Scatman (Ski Ba Bop Ba Dop Bop)"	Scatman John	
September 11	"Scatman (Ski Ba Bop Ba Dop Bop)"	Scatman John	
September 18	"Scatman (Ski Ba Bop Ba Dop Bop)"	Scatman John	
September 25	"Fat Boy"	Max-A-Million	
October 2	"Fat Boy"	Max-A-Million	
October 9	"I Dream of You Tonight"	Taboo	
October 16	"Right Type of Mood"	Herbie	
October 23	"Right Type of Mood"	Herbie	
October 30	"Right Type of Mood"	Herbie	
November 6	"Fantasy"	Mariah Carey	
November 13	"Fantasy"	Mariah Carey	
November 20	"I Believe"	Happy Clappers	
November 27	"Stayin' Alive"	N-Trance	
December 4	"Stayin' Alive"	N-Trance	
December 11	"Stayin' Alive"	N-Trance	
December 18	"Stayin' Alive"	N-Trance	

== See also ==
- 1995 in Canadian music
- List of RPM number-one dance singles chart (Canada)
