= List of RPM number-one dance singles of 1999 =

These are the RPM magazine Dance number one hits of 1999.

== Chart history ==
Issue date	Song	Artist	Reference(s)
January 25	"Believe"	Cher	
February 1	"Believe"	Cher	
February 8	"Believe"	Cher	
February 15	"Home Alone" (featuring Keith Murray)	R. Kelly	
February 22	"Believe"	Cher	
March 1	"Home Alone" (featuring Keith Murray)	R. Kelly	
March 8	"Believe"	Cher	
March 15	"All Night Long"	Faith Evans	
March 22	"No Scrubs"	TLC	
March 29	"All Night Long"	Faith Evans	
April 5	"No Scrubs"	TLC	
April 12	"No Scrubs"	TLC	
April 19	"No Scrubs"	TLC	
April 26	"No Scrubs"	TLC	
May 3	"No Scrubs"	TLC	
May 10	"No Scrubs"	TLC	
May 17	"Girlfriend/Boyfriend" (featuring Janet Jackson, Ja Rule & Eve)	Blackstreet	
May 24	"We Like to Party	Vengaboys	
May 31	"Skin"	Charlotte	
June 7	"No Scrubs"	TLC	
June 14	"Livin' la Vida Loca"	Ricky Martin	
June 21	"Livin' la Vida Loca"	Ricky Martin	
June 28	"Skin"	Charlotte	
July 5	"Who Do U Love"	Love Inc.	
July 12	"U Don't Know Me" (featuring Duane Harden)	Armand Van Helden	
July 19	"Can't Get Enough"	Soulsearcher	
July 26	"Flowerz" (featuring Roland Clark)	Armand Van Helden	
August 2	"Boom, Boom, Boom, Boom"	Vengaboys	
August 9	"If You Had My Love"	Jennifer Lopez	
August 16	"Can't Get Enough"	Soulsearcher	
August 23	"Jamboree"	Naughty by Nature	
August 30	"If You Had My Love"	Jennifer Lopez	
September 6	Jamboree	Naughty by Nature	
September 13	Jamboree	Naughty by Nature	
September 20	Jamboree	Naughty by Nature	
September 27	"Bills, Bills, Bills"	Destiny's Child	
October 4	"Jamboree"	Naughty by Nature	
October 11	"Mambo #5"	Lou Bega	
October 18	"Mambo #5"	Lou Bega	
October 25	"Mambo #5"	Lou Bega	
November 1	"Mambo #5"	Lou Bega	
November 8	"Mambo #5"	Lou Bega	
November 15	"Blue (Da Ba Dee)"	Eiffel 65	
November 22	"Blue (Da Ba Dee)"	Eiffel 65	
November 29	"Blue (Da Ba Dee)"	Eiffel 65	
December 6	"September 99"	Earth, Wind & Fire	
December 13	"Sun Is Shining"	Bob Marley vs. Funkstar De Luxe	
December 20	"Waiting for Tonight"	Jennifer Lopez	

== See also ==
- 1999 in music
- List of RPM number-one dance singles chart (Canada)
