= Stereo Martini =

Canadian musical duo

Stereo Martini is a Canadian electronic remixing and production duo composed of Gerard Briz (a.k.a. Gerardo Brizuela) and Alonso Mendez (aka Alonso Mendizabal)

They are based out of Toronto, Ontario, Canada, and have remixed or produced electronic and house music under the name Stereo Martini since 2008.

== Personal life ==
Brizuela is a trained musician who attended Humber College Jazz Program in the 1990s and later became an Audio Engineer at Trebas Institute. He was also part owner and lead songwriter/composer/arranger of Dominicanada in the 1990s. Canada's leading Latin band at the time. Signed to a distribution deal with MRP Records distributed by EMI and Sunrise Records, Dominicanada released several albums and traveled across Canada and USA on many promotional tours. He also attended Earl Haig Secondary School/Claude Watson program for the performing arts as a music major.

Alonso Mendez is a local DJ born in Lima, Peru and came to Canada in January 1988. He went to Father Michael Goetz with a focus in the performing arts then studied at Humber College of Applied Arts and Technology. He was accepted into the arts program with scholarship at both York University and University of Toronto in the acting and performing arts program, but ultimately balanced his performing arts talents with marketing and business studies at Humber College instead. He has worked as a DJ in Toronto and around the world since 1999 after working as an artist and marketing consultant for Universal Music Group Canada. With Gerard Briz, he has created popular remixes of R&B and dance hits with Jully Black, Matt Dusk, La India, America Olivo, Sak Noel, Jes Brieden, Davidson Ospina, Oscar P, Maurice Joshua, Sasha Alazy, Lidell Townsell, Sound Bluntz, Lil' Pete, Cory Bradshaw, Tony Bishop, Emjay, Marcos Pearson, Jesse Reyez, and many more...

== Career ==
Upon Brizuela's last Latin release of his own band called Tumbao Inc in 2005, Alonso and Gerard met through a mutual friend and discovered their similarities in music taste and styles, love for house music and electronic influences into traditional songwriting for, pop and contemporary Latin.

They have worked with the following artists: Canadian jazz crooner Matt Dusk (Feels Good Remix 2011) - Worldwide release on October 11, 2011, on Mas+ Label / EMPO Records

La India ("I Can't Get No Sleep" 2009 remixes, which charted at number 3 on the billboard hot 100 Dance tracks in October 2009)

Had a 2009 hit “Deja-Vu” with Actor/Musician/Songwriter America Olivo, best known as a member of the former Latino-American Pop/R&B group Soluna, lead actor as Camero in Bitch Slap the movie, and played the villainess, Arachne, in the Broadway hit Spider-Man: Turn Off the Dark the Musical, Friday the 13th.

The Sound Bluntz - Juno Award Winners Cory Bradshaw and Lil' Pete - On the track "Lucky (Maybe You'll get)" featuring singer Cheyne Coates of Madison Avenue fame.

Storm Newtown, Actor, Singer, and personal trainer (featured in the Canadian production of Dirty Dancing in Toronto in 2010 and personal trainer to the Kardashian sisters in Los Angeles); Emjay, popular singer in the 1990s of French-Canadian heritage whose hit "Flying to The Moon" has been remade by Stereo Martini for a 2012 release; Tony Bishop, also a popular Canadian singer from the 1990s known for his "house" version of George Michael’s Father Figure, released under Captain Records in 1992.
