= First base (disambiguation) =

First base is the position played by a first baseman in baseball.

First base may also refer to:

- Kissing, in baseball metaphors for sex
- First Base (group), a 1990s German Eurodance group
- First Base (album), a 1972 album by the English rock band Babe Ruth
