= List of RPM number-one dance singles of 1989 =

These are the RPM magazine Dance number-one hits of 1989.

== Chart history ==
Issue date	Song	Artist	Reference(s)
January 14	"The Only Way Is Up"	Yazz and the Plastic Population	
January 21	"Big Fun"	Inner City	
January 28	"Under Your Spell"	Candi & The Backbeat	
February 4	"Wild Thing"	Tone Loc	
February 6	"Wild Thing"	Tone Loc	
February 13	"Wild Thing"	Tone Loc	
February 20	"Wild Thing"	Tone Loc	
February 27	"Good Life"	Inner City	
March 6	"Straight Up"	Paula Abdul	
March 13	"Straight Up"	Paula Abdul	
March 20	"Straight Up"	Paula Abdul	
March 27	"She Drives Me Crazy"	Fine Young Cannibals	
April 3	"She Drives Me Crazy"	Fine Young Cannibals	
April 10	"She Drives Me Crazy"	Fine Young Cannibals	
April 17	"Like a Prayer"	Madonna	
April 24	"Funky Cold Medina"	Tone Lōc	
May 1	"Funky Cold Medina"	Tone Lōc	
May 8	"Funky Cold Medina"	Tone Lōc	
May 15	"Buffalo Stance"	Neneh Cherry	
May 22	"Buffalo Stance"	Neneh Cherry	
May 29	"Buffalo Stance"	Neneh Cherry	
June 5	"Every Little Step"	Bobby Brown	
June 12	"Every Little Step"	Bobby Brown	
June 19	"This Time I Know It's for Real	Donna Summer	
June 26	"This Time I Know It's for Real	Donna Summer	
July 3	"Baby Don't Forget My Number"	Milli Vanilli	
July 10	"Express Yourself"	Madonna	
July 17	"Express Yourself"	Madonna	
July 24	"Keep On Movin'"	Soul II Soul	
July 31	"What You Don't Know"	Exposé	
August 7	"On Our Own"	Bobby Brown	
August 14	"On Our Own"	Bobby Brown	
August 21	"I Like It"	Dino	
August 28	"I Like It"	Dino	
September 4	"Cold Hearted"	Paula Abdul	
September 11	"Cold Hearted"	Paula Abdul	
September 18	"Cold Hearted"	Paula Abdul	
September 25	"Bust a Move"	Young MC	
October 2	"Bust a Move"	Young MC	
October 9	"Back to Life (However Do You Want Me)"	Soul II Soul	
October 16	"Back to Life (However Do You Want Me)"	Soul II Soul	
October 23	"Back to Life (However Do You Want Me)"	Soul II Soul	
October 30	"Miss You Much"	Janet Jackson	
November 11	"Miss You Much"	Janet Jackson	
November 18	"Bust a Move"	Young MC	
November 24	"Pump Up the Jam	Technotronic	
December 2	"Pump Up the Jam	Technotronic	
December 9	"Pump Up the Jam	Technotronic	
December 16	"Pump Up the Jam	Technotronic	
December 23	"Pump Up the Jam	Technotronic	

== See also ==
- List of RPM number-one dance singles chart (Canada)
