= Sarina Paris (album) =

Studio album by Sarina Paris
- Released: May 22, 2001
- Recorded: 1999–2000
- Genres: Eurodance; bubblegum pop; italo dance
- Length: 47:36
- Labels: Playland; Priority

Singles from Sarina Paris
- 1. "Look at Us" Released: 1999; 2. "Just About Enough" Released: 2001

Sarina Paris is the self-titled debut studio album by Canadian singer Sarina Paris, which was released on May 22, 2001. As of 2024, this is Paris' only studio album to date, reaching number 167 on the Billboard 200 in the United States. Additionally, Paris was nominated for a Juno Award in 2001, for "Look at Us, in the category of Best Dance Recording.

== Critical reception ==
Professional ratings
Review scores
Source	Rating
AllMusic	1.5/5 stars

Sarina Paris received mixed reviews from music critics. The Orlando Sentinel commented on the album's quantity of "catchy tunes bound to get you dancing." However, The Washington Post, while suggesting that Paris is capable of more, wrote that the album provided evidence that, for the time being, Paris is "another mindless slave to pop fashion." USA Today also gave the album an unfavorable review, calling it forgettable and "cloying", despite "some moderately catchy tunes".

Most reviewers commented on the instrumental arrangements, including Liana Jonas of AllMusic, who wrote, "The thin music and arrangements on the 13 tracks are simply monotonous", in a generally negative review, although she praised the album's single "Look at Us", remarked somewhat favorably about the album's song, "True Love", and stated that Paris had some promising musical potential.

Billboard wrote that she is "well-poised to please fans of Eiffel 65, Sonique, and Aqua."

== Track listing ==
No.	Title	Length
1.	"Look at Us"	3:29
2.	"You"	3:53
3.	"So I Wait"	3:02
4.	"Just About Enough"	3:45
5.	"Love in Return"	3:08
6.	"True Colors" (cover of Cyndi Lauper's song)	3:28
7.	"Angel"	3:26
8.	"Dreamin' of You"	3:15
9.	"The Single Life"	3:33
10.	"True Love"	3:19
11.	"Romeo's Dead"	3:15
12.	"All in the Way"	3:51
13.	"I Love You" (Bonus Track)	6:20
Total length:		47:36
