= List of RPM number-one dance singles of 1978 =

These are the RPM magazine Dance number one hits of 1978.

== Number ones of 1978 ==
Issue date	Song	Artist	Reference(s)
January 1 - February 17	No charts or not archived	No charts or not archived	
February 18	Supernature (all cuts)	Cerrone	
February 25	Supernature (all cuts)	Cerrone	
March 4	Supernature (all cuts)	Cerrone	
March 11	Supernature (all cuts)	Cerrone	
March 18	Supernature (all cuts)	Cerrone	
March 25	Voyage (all cuts)	Voyage	
April 11	"(Theme Song From) Which Way Is Up?"	Stargard	
April 15	If My Friends Could See Me Now (all cuts)	Linda Clifford	
April 22	If My Friends Could See Me Now (all cuts)	Linda Clifford	
April 29	If My Friends Could See Me Now (all cuts)	Linda Clifford	
May 6	If My Friends Could See Me Now (all cuts)	Linda Clifford	
May 13	Unknown	Unknown	
May 20	If My Friends Could See Me Now (all cuts)	Linda Clifford	
May 27	If My Friends Could See Me Now (all cuts)	Linda Clifford	
June 3	If My Friends Could See Me Now (all cuts)	Linda Clifford	
June 10	If My Friends Could See Me Now (all cuts)	Linda Clifford	
June 17	"Dance All Over the World"	T.C. James & Fist-O-Funk	
June 24	Copacabana	Barry Manilow	
July 1	Boogie Oogie Oogie	A Taste of Honey	
July 2 - July 28	Unknown	Unknown	
July 29	"Boogie Oogie Oogie"	A Taste of Honey	
August 5	"Boogie Oogie Oogie"	A Taste of Honey	
August 12	"Boogie Oogie Oogie"	A Taste of Honey	
August 19	Unknown	Unknown	
August 26	"Hot Shot"	Karen Young	
August 27 - September 15	Unknown	Unknown	
September 16	"Keep on Jumpin'"	Musique	
September 23	"Keep on Jumpin'"	Musique	
September 30 - October 7	Unknown	Unknown	
October 14	"MacArthur Park"	Donna Summer	
October 21	"MacArthur Park"	Donna Summer	
October 28	"Let's Start the Dance"	Bohannon	
November 4	"Let's Start the Dance"	Bohannon	
November 11	"Let's Start the Dance"	Bohannon	
November 18	"Let's Start the Dance"	Bohannon	
November 25	"Le Freak"	Chic	
December 2	"Le Freak"	Chic	
December 9	"Le Freak"	Chic	
December 16	"Le Freak"	Chic	
December 23	"Le Freak"	Chic	
December 30	"Le Freak"	Chic	

== See also ==
- List of RPM number-one dance singles chart (Canada)
