= List of RPM number-one dance singles of 1992 =

These are the RPM magazine Dance number one hits of 1992.

== Chart history ==
Issue date	Song	Artist	Reference(s)
January 18	"Black or White"	Michael Jackson	
January 25	"Black or White"	Michael Jackson	
February 1	"Black or White"	Michael Jackson	
February 8	"I'm Too Sexy	Right Said Fred	
February 15	"I'm Too Sexy	Right Said Fred	
February 22	"Pride (In the Name of Love)"	Clivillés + Cole	
February 29	"Pride (In the Name of Love)"	Clivillés + Cole	
March 7	"I'm Too Sexy"	Right Said Fred	
March 14	"Justified & Ancient (Stand by The JAMs)" (featuring Tammy Wynette)	The KLF	
March 21	"We Got a Love Thang"	CeCe Peniston	
March 28	"We Got a Love Thang"	CeCe Peniston	
April 4	"Remember the Time"	Michael Jackson	
April 11	"Remember the Time"	Michael Jackson	
April 18	"Justified & Ancient (Stand by the JAMs)" (featuring Tammy Wynette)	The KLF	
April 25	"Hold On"	Clubland	
May 2	"Hold On"	Clubland	
May 9	"Jump"	Kris Kross	
May 16	"Jump"	Kris Kross	
May 23	"Jump"	Kris Kross	
May 30	"Jump"	Kris Kross	
June 6	"Jump"	Kris Kross	
June 13	"Jump"	Kris Kross	
June 20	"Jump"	Kris Kross	
June 27	"Jump"	Kris Kross	
July 4	"Twilight Zone"	2 Unlimited	
July 11	"Twilight Zone"	2 Unlimited	
July 18	"Set Me Free"	Clubland	
July 25	"Set Me Free"	Clubland	
August 1	"Keep On Walkin'"	CeCe Peniston	
August 8	"Set Me Free"	Clubland	
August 15	"Set Me Free"	Clubland	
August 22	"Warm It Up"	Kris Kross	
August 29	"Too Funky"	George Michael	
September 5	"Rhythm Is a Dancer"	Snap!	
September 12	"Rhythm Is a Dancer"	Snap!	
September 19	"Rhythm Is a Dancer"	Snap!	
September 26	"Rhythm Is a Dancer"	Snap!	
October 3	"Rhythm Is a Dancer"	Snap!	
October 10	"Rhythm Is a Dancer"	Snap!	
October 17	"Rhythm Is a Dancer"	Snap!	
October 24	"Rhythm Is a Dancer"	Snap!	
October 31	"Rhythm Is a Dancer"	Snap!	
November 7	"The Magic Friend"	2 Unlimited	
November 14	"The Magic Friend"	2 Unlimited	
November 21	"People Everyday"	Arrested Development	
November 28	"The Magic Friend"	2 Unlimited	
December 5	"Jump!"	The Movement	
December 12	"Jump!"	The Movement	
December 19	"Jump!"	The Movement	
December 26	"Understand This Groove"	Sound Factory	

== See also ==
- 1992 in Canadian music
- List of RPM number-one dance singles chart (Canada)
