= List of RPM number-one dance singles of 1979 =

These are the RPM magazine Dance number one hits of 1979.

== Chart History ==
Issue date	Song	Artist	Reference(s)
January 13	"Le Freak"	Chic	
January 20	"Le Freak"	Chic	
January 27	"Contact"	Edwin Starr	
February 3	"Rasputin"	Boney M	
February 10-April 14	Unknown	Unknown	
April 21	"Knock on Wood"	Amii Stewart	
April 28-May 5	Unknown	Unknown	
May 12	"Heart of Glass"	Blondie	
May 19	"Reunited"	Peaches & Herb	
May 26-June 9	Unknown	Unknown	
June 16	"Hot Stuff"	Donna Summer	
June 23	"Hot Stuff"	Donna Summer	
June 30	"Hot Stuff"	Donna Summer	
July 7	"We Are Family"	Sister Sledge	
July 14	"We Are Family"	Sister Sledge	
July 21	"We Are Family"	Sister Sledge	
July 28	"Ring My Bell"	Anita Ward	
August 4	"Ring My Bell"	Anita Ward	
August 11	"Bad Girls"	Donna Summer	
August 18	"Bad Girls"	Donna Summer	
August 25	"Born to Be Alive"	Patrick Hernandez	
September 1	"Born to Be Alive"	Patrick Hernandez	
September 8	"Good Times"	Chic	
September 15	"Good Times"	Chic	
September 22	"I Was Made For Lovin' You"	KISS	
September 29	"I Was Made For Lovin' You"	KISS	
October 6	"I Was Made For Lovin' You"	KISS	
October 13	"Lead Me On"	Maxine Nightingale	
October 20	"Lead Me On"	Maxine Nightingale	
October 27	"Pop Muzik"	M	
November 3	"Pop Muzik"	M	
November 10	"Rise"	Herb Alpert	
November 17	"Lead Me On"	Maxine Nightingale	
November 24	"Lead Me On"	Maxine Nightingale	
December 1	"Don't Stop Till You Get Enough"	Michael Jackson	
December 8	"Don't Stop Till You Get Enough"	Michael Jackson	
December 15	"Don't Stop Till You Get Enough"	Michael Jackson	
December 22	"No More Tears (Enough Is Enough)"	Barbra Streisand and Donna Summer	
December 30	"No More Tears (Enough Is Enough)"	Barbra Streisand and Donna Summer	

== See also ==
- 1979 in Canadian music
- List of RPM number-one dance singles chart (Canada)
