= List of RPM number-one dance singles of 1990 =

These are the RPM magazine Dance number-one hits of 1990.

== Chart history ==
Issue date	Song	Artist	Reference(s)
January 20	"Two to Make It Right"	Seduction	
January 27	"Get Busy"	Mr. Lee	
February 3	"Let Your Backbone Slide"	Maestro Fresh-Wes	
February 10	"Let Your Backbone Slide"	Maestro Fresh-Wes	
February 17	"Let Your Backbone Slide"	Maestro Fresh-Wes	
February 24	"Get Up! (Before the Night Is Over)"	Technotronic	
March 3	"Opposites Attract"	Paula Abdul	
March 10	"Opposites Attract"	Paula Abdul	
March 17	"Get Up! (Before the Night Is Over)"	Technotronic	
March 24	"Escapade"	Janet Jackson	
March 31	"Escapade"	Janet Jackson	
April 7	"All Around the World"	Lisa Stansfield	
April 14	"Touch Me"	49ers	
April 21	"Touch Me"	49ers	
April 28	"Touch Me"	49ers	
May 5	"Touch Me"	49ers	
May 12	"Touch Me"	49ers	
May 19	"Vogue"	Madonna	
May 26	"Vogue"	Madonna	
June 2	"Vogue"	Madonna	
June 9	"Vogue"	Madonna	
June 16	"Vogue"	Madonna	
June 23	"Vogue"	Madonna	
June 30	"U Can't Touch This"	MC Hammer	
July 7	"The Power"	Snap!	
July 14	"The Power"	Snap!	
July 21	"The Power"	Snap!	
July 28	"The Power"	Snap!	
August 4	"U Can't Touch This"	MC Hammer	
August 11	"U Can't Touch This"	MC Hammer	
August 18	"Everybody Everybody"	Black Box	
August 25	"Everybody Everybody"	Black Box	
September 1	"Everybody Everybody"	Black Box	
September 8	"Everybody Everybody"	Black Box	
September 15	"Dirty Cash (Money Talks)"	The Adventures of Stevie V	
September 22	"Groove Is in the Heart"	Deee-Lite	
September 29	"Oops Up"	Snap!	
October 6	"Oops Up"	Snap!	
October 13	"Close to You"	Maxi Priest	
October 20	"Close to You"	Maxi Priest	
October 27	"Oops Up"	Snap!	
November 3	"Groove Is in the Heart"	Deee-Lite	
November 10	"Groove Is in the Heart"	Deee-Lite	
November 17	"Ice Ice Baby"	Vanilla Ice	
November 24	"Ice Ice Baby"	Vanilla Ice	
December 1	"Ice Ice Baby"	Vanilla Ice	
December 8	"Wiggle It"	2 in a Room	
December 15	"Wiggle It"	2 in a Room	
December 22	"Wiggle It"	2 in a Room	

== See also ==
- List of RPM number-one dance singles chart (Canada)
