= List of RPM number-one dance singles of 1988 =

These are the RPM magazine dance number-one hits of 1988. No chart was published from January 1980 until September 3, 1988.

== Chart history ==
Issue date	Song	Artist	Reference(s)
September 3	"I Don't Wanna Go on with You Like That"	Elton John	
September 10	"Theme from S-Express"	S'Express	
September 17	"Heart"	Pet Shop Boys	
September 24	"Supersonic"	J. J. Fad	
October 1	"Chains of Love"	Erasure	
October 8	"The Loco-Motion"	Kylie Minogue	
October 15	"The Loco-Motion"	Kylie Minogue	
October 22	"The Loco-Motion"	Kylie Minogue	
October 29	"Strokin'"	Clarence Carter	
November 5	"Strokin'"	Clarence Carter	
November 12	"You Came"	Kim Wilde	
November 19	"Wild, Wild West"	The Escape Club	
November 26	"Wild, Wild West"	The Escape Club	
December 3	"Wild, Wild West"	The Escape Club	
December 10	"Big Fun"	Inner City	
December 17	"Big Fun"	Inner City	
December 24	"Big Fun"	Inner City	

== See also ==
- List of number-one dance hits (Canada)
