= Kidstreet (band) =

Canadian electronica band

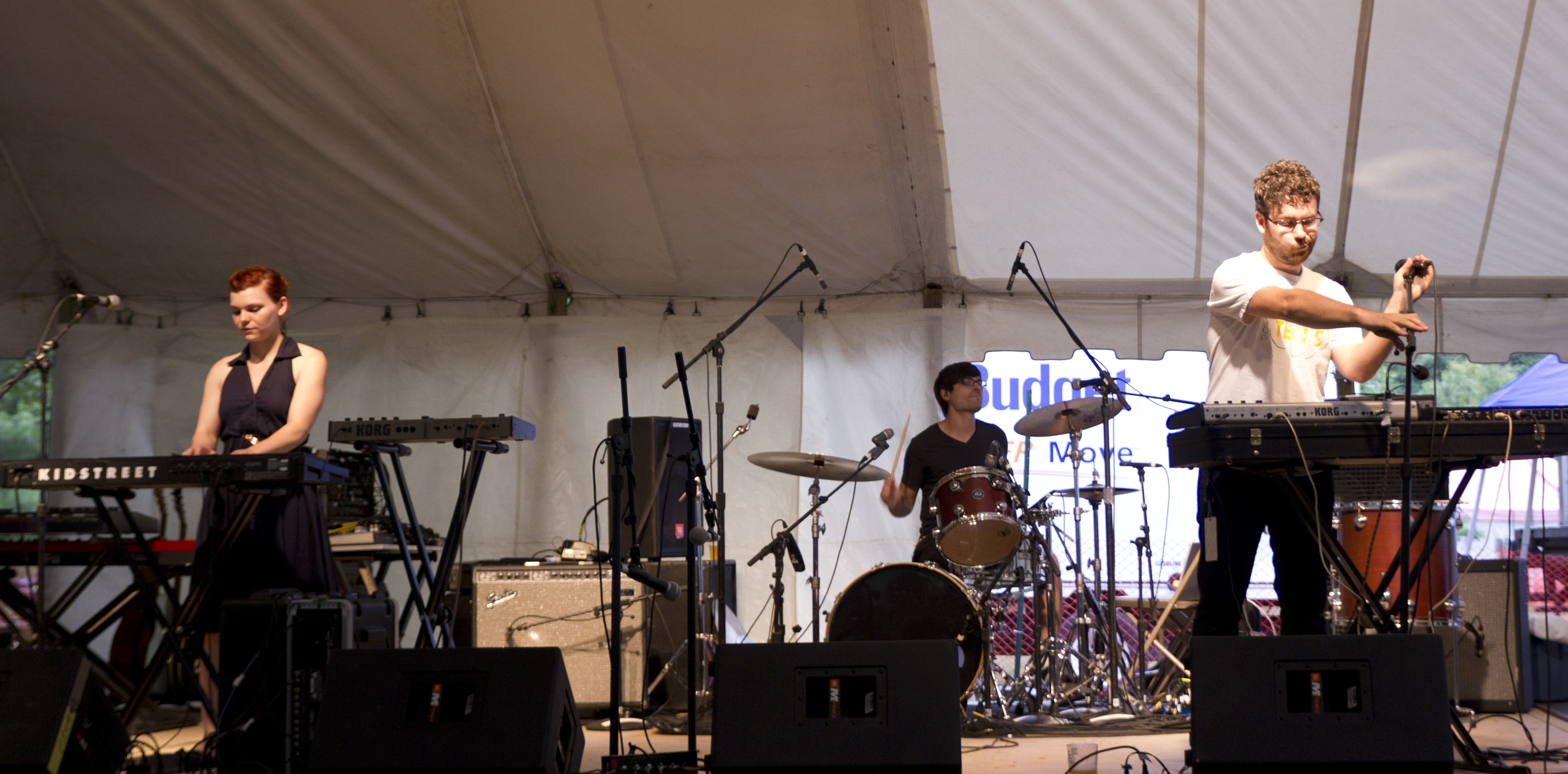
- Kidstreet performing at the 2011 Hillside Festival

Background information
- Origin: Waterloo, Ontario, Canada
- Genres: Electronica
- Years active: 2007–present
- Labels: Nettwerk
- Members: Karl Snyder; Cliff Snyder; Edna Snyder
- Website: myspace.com/kidstreet

Kidstreet is a Canadian electronica trio formed in 2007 in Waterloo, Ontario, Canada. The band is composed of two brothers and one sister: Karl Snyder on drums, Cliff Snyder on synth and guitar, and younger sister Edna Snyder on piano and vocals. The trio have a unique form of synth-pop.

The band signed with Nettwerk in 2010. Kidstreet have since signed a major licensing deal with Ford. The staccato piano from their song (simply titled "Song") backs the car-maker's latest television spot as well as Apple's MacBook Pro with retina display television spot.

Onstage, the band blends electronic elements with live drums, vocals, guitar and synths. They have toured with fellow Canadian artists Dragonette, Mother Mother, Thunderheist, and Rich Aucoin as well as international artists Girl Talk and Health. They performed at the 2011 Canadian Music Week.

== Discography ==
- 2011: X EP
- 2011: "Birthday Boy" Single
- 2011: "Never Coming Back" Single
- 2011: Fuh Yeah
- 2012: "Song" Single [This song was first used in Ford's 2009 commercials, followed by most of their 2011 commercials. In 2012, Apple also took this song for their MacBook Pro commercial video.]
