= Chris Sheppard =

Canadian former DJ and musician (born c. 1963)

- Born: 1962 or 1963 (age 62–63); Etobicoke, Ontario
- Origin: Canada
- Genres: Eurodance; electronic; techno
- Occupations: DJ; remixer; club promoter; producer
- Instruments: Keyboards; turntables
- Years active: 1980s–2000s

Chris Sheppard (born c. 1963), also known as DJ Dogwhistle, is a Canadian DJ, record producer and musician.

One of the leading figures in the Canadian dance music scene in the 1980s and 1990s, he was active as both a club and radio DJ.

From the 1990s into the 2000s, he hosted a syndicated dance music radio show that was broadcast nationally in Canada and released several remix albums. As a musician he formed the Juno Award-winning dance groups BKS and Love Inc.

== Early life ==
Sheppard lived in the Toronto suburb of Mississauga in his youth and attended Alderwood Collegiate Institute in Etobicoke. He studied radio and television arts at Ryerson Polytechnical Institute.

== Career ==
Sheppard's music career started in the punk and alternative rock scenes, working with and remixing music for such artists as Skinny Puppy, Ministry, Jesus Jones, The Cult, The Clash and New Order. Starting in the 1980s, he worked as a DJ and host of several warehouse parties and raves in the Toronto area. By the mid-1980s he was deejaying at Toronto dance clubs such as The Edge, The Domino Club and The Copa, eventually becoming a featured DJ at RPM. In 1985, while working at The Copa, CFNY program director David Marsden heard Sheppard's work and hired him as the host of a Saturday night alternative dance music show called Club 102. The radio show later expanded to a live broadcast from various Toronto nightclubs on Friday nights.

Sheppard became part-owner of the punk and alternative rock nightclub Bovine Sex Club in 1991. The following year, Sheppard resigned from CFNY during the station's restructuring and subsequently deejayed for Greater Toronto Area dance music stations Energy 108 and Z103.5. His dance music radio program, Pirate Radio, later renamed Groove Station, went into syndication and was broadcast from stations across Canada. During this time, Sheppard released several compilation albums of dance music via his own record label, Pirate Records & Music. His compilation album series included Pirate Radio Sessions, Destination Dance Floor, Groove Station and Club Cutz. In the 1990s he would at times perform at clubs under the name DJ Dogwhistle and released two compilation albums as Dogwhistle Soundsystem. He adopted the Dogwhistle alias due to a contractual conflict.

Sheppard formed the techno group BKS whose first album was released in 1992. The group's single "Astroplane (City of Love Mix)" won the 1997 Juno Award for Best Dance Recording and the video for the single won them the 1996 MuchMusic award for Best Dance Video.

Sheppard formed Love Inc. in 1997, along with vocalist Simone Denny and fellow producer/remixer Brad Daymond. Love Inc. won the Juno Award for Best Dance Recording for "Broken Bones" and in 2001 for "Into the Night".

Sheppard stopped releasing music in the 2000s and his last reported public appearance was on a 2014 episode of the Humble & Fred podcast.

== Discography ==
- Techno Trip (1992)
- Sheppard's Revenge (1992)
- Still Trippin (1992)
- Trip to the Moon (1993)
- Have a Nice Trip (1993)
- Pirate Radio Sessions Vol. 1: The Underground Collection (1994)
- Pirate Radio Sessions Vol. 2: Club Culture (1994)
- The Life and Time of an After Hours DJ (1995, as Dogwhistle)
- Pirate Radio Sessions Vol. 3 (1995)
- Pirate Radio Sessions Vol 4: The Best of 1995 (1995)
- Destination Dance Floor (1995)
- Pirate Radio Sessions Vol. 5 (1996)
- 2 Hi 4 Humans (1996, as Dogwhistle)
- Destination Dance Floor 2 (1996)
- Pirate Radio Sessions Vol. 6 (1996)
- Destination Dance Floor 3 (1997)
- Kwikmix 2938 (1998, as Dogwhistle)
- Groove Station 4 (1998)
- Club Cutz 101 (1998)
- Club Cutz 201 (1999)
- Groove Station 5 (1999)
- Club Cutz 303 (2000)
- Groove Station 6 (2000)
- Club Cutz 404 (2001)
- Euphoria: Hard House & Progressive Anthems (2001)
- Club Cutz 505 (2001)
- Club Cutz 606 (2002)
- Euphoria 2: Deep, Dark & Underground (2002)
- Loud Ass Mother Fucker (2006)
