= Hatiras =

Canadian electronic musician and DJ

George Hatiras is a Canadian electronic musician and DJ. He is most noted as a two-time Juno Award winner for Dance Recording of the Year, winning at the Juno Awards of 2002 for "Spaced Invader" and at the Juno Awards of 2006 for "Spanish Fly".
