= Broken Bones (song) =

1998 single by Love Inc.

- Canadian CD single artwork

Single by Love Inc.

from the album Love Inc.
- Released: 1997
- Length: 4:02
- Label: Vik.
- Songwriters: Chris Sheppard; Brad Daymond
- Producers: Chris Sheppard; Brad Daymond

Love Inc. singles chronology
"Broken Bones" (1997)	"You're a Superstar" (1998)

"Broken Bones" is a song by Canadian Eurodance group Love Inc., featuring vocals by Simone Denny. The lyrics discuss selling drugs. The song was released in 1997 as the band's debut single, serving as the lead single from their first album, Love Inc.

"Broken Bones" was one of the most played songs on Canadian radio in 1998, reaching the top spot on the RPM Dance chart, No. 6 on the Canadian Singles Chart, and No. 23 on the RPM 100 Hit Tracks chart. The song's video helped the act win a Best Video and Best Dance Video award at the 1998 MuchMusic Video Awards. and the song itself would give the act a Juno Award for Best Dance Recording at the Juno Awards of 1999. Outside Canada, the song reached No. 52 on Australia's ARIA Singles Chart in July 1999 and No. 8 on the UK Singles Chart in May 2003.

== Track listings ==
CD maxi – Canada (1997)

1. "Broken Bones" (City of Love – Radio Mix) – 4:02
2. "Broken Bones" (City of Love – Club Mix) – 6:34
3. "Broken Bones" (RipRock N' Booty's Magical Mystery Detour Mix - 12-inch Riprock 'n' Alex G remix) – 8:41
4. "Broken Bones" (I Used to Sell You Things You Could Only Find on a Dancefloor – Remix) – 5:35
5. "Broken Bones" (Groove Station – Radio Mix)

12-inch promo – United States (1998)

1. "Broken Bones" (City of Love – Radio Mix by Peter Ries) – 4:02
2. "Broken Bones" (City of Love – Club Mix by Peter Ries) – 6:34
3. "Broken Bones" (RipRock N' Booty's Magical Mystery Detour Mix – 12-inch Riprock 'n' Alex G remix) – 8:41
4. "Broken Bones" (I Used to Sell You Things You Could Only Find on a Dancefloor – Remix by Florian Richter) – 5:35

== Charts ==
=== Weekly charts ===
Chart (1998–1999)	Peak position
Australia (ARIA)	52
Canada (Nielsen SoundScan)	6
Canada Top Singles (RPM)	23
Canada Dance/Urban (RPM)	1

Chart (2003)	Peak position
Europe (Eurochart Hot 100)	34
Ireland (IRMA)	26
Ireland Dance (IRMA)	3
Scottish Singles Sales (Official Charts)	4
UK Singles (Official Charts)	8
UK Dance (Official Charts)	4

=== Year-end charts ===
Chart (1998)	Position
Canada Top Singles (RPM)	44
Canada Dance (RPM)	5

Chart (2003)	Position
UK Singles (OCC)	182

== Certifications ==
Region	Certification	Certified units/sales
Canada (Music Canada)	Gold	40,000^{‡}
^{‡} Sales+streaming figures based on certification alone.
