= So Sus =

Canadian electronic music producer

Tanatswa Pfende, known professionally as So Sus, is a Canadian electronic music producer from Vancouver, British Columbia, whose 2019 EP Voices was a Juno Award nominee for Dance Recording of the Year at the Juno Awards of 2021.

Their song "Not Me" was featured on Monstercat's Compound 2021 compilation, a collaboration with Canadian record label Westwood Recordings.

== Discography ==
=== Extended plays ===
Title	Information
Genesis (with Hex Cougar and Pauline Herr featuring Sejo)	Released: 11 June 2021; Label: Alter/Ego; Formats: Digital download

=== Singles ===
Title	Year	Album	Label
"East Bridge" (with Hex Cougar and Pauline Herr featuring Sejo)	2021	Genesis	Alter/Ego
"Not Me" (with Maazel featuring Madalen Duke)	2021	Monstercat Compound 2021	Monstercat; Westwood Recordings
