= Emjay =

- Birth name: Marie-Josée Riel
- Born: December 9, 1974 (age 50)
- Origin: Ottawa, Ontario, Canada
- Genres: Eurodance
- Occupation: Singer-songwriter
- Years active: 1987–2006, 2018–present
- Labels: Numuzik Inc., Tycoon Records

Marie-Josée Riel also known as Emjay (born December 9, 1974) is a Canadian eurodance musician.

== Musical career ==
After fronting a local Ottawa band for several years, she recorded a solo project in 1994 and signed a recording contract. She released several singles and one album in her career.

In 2000, she received a Juno Award nomination for Best Dance Recording, for her single "Over and Over".

In July 2018, Emjay announced she would be releasing a new single. It would be her first original release in nearly 20 years. She continues to perform occasionally in Toronto, Ottawa and Montreal nightclubs.

== Discography ==
=== Studio albums ===
Title and album details	
In Your Arms: Released: 1995; Label: PolyTel; Formats: CD, cassette	Track list: 1. "Sound of My Heartbeat" (5:26); 2. "In Your Arms" (4:30); 3. "Flying to the Moon" (5:23); 4. "Bring Me" (6:17); 5. "Summertime" (6:13); 6. "So Far Away" (3:52); 7. "Be My Man" (4:35); 8. "Fascinated" (5:00); 9. "You Say Love" (5:12); 10. "Every Night" (4:39); 11. "Falling in Love" (5:11); 12. "Sing It" (4:06); 13. "Point of No Return" (4:40); 14. "Fascinated (Underground Mix)" (remix by DJ Andre and DJ Renzo) (6:06)

=== Singles ===
Year	Title	Chart Positions	Album
Year	Title	CAN Dance	Album
1994	"Sound of My Heartbeat"	14	In Your Arms
1995	"Fascinated"	10	In Your Arms
1995	"Flying to the Moon"	4	In Your Arms
1995	"In Your Arms"	—	In Your Arms
1996	"Point of No Return"	—	In Your Arms
1996	"Be My Man"	—	In Your Arms
1997	"We All Need Love"	—	Singles Only
1998	"Let It Go"	—	Singles Only
1999	"Over and Over"	—	Singles Only
1999	"Love Will Keep Us Together"	—	Singles Only
1999	"Is This For Real"	—	Singles Only
2019	"Living My Life" (with ABA/Z Project)		Singles Only
2020	"As Above So Below" (with Phoenix Lord & Saggian)		Singles Only
2020	"You Keep Me Hanging On"		Singles Only
"—" denotes releases that did not chart
