= The Sound Bluntz =

The Sound Bluntz were a Canadian dance music duo, consisting of producers Cory Bradshaw and Peter Pantzoures. They are most noted as two-time winners of the Juno Award for Dance Recording of the Year, winning at the Juno Awards of 2003 for their cover of Michael Jackson's "Billie Jean" and at the Juno Awards of 2004 for "Something About You".

They were also nominated, but did not win, at the Juno Awards of 2007 for "(Maybe You'll Get) Lucky".
