= Chyl =

Chinese-Canadian electronic musician

- Chyl in 2025

Background information
- Education: Columbia University
- Genre: Electronic music
- Occupation: Musician

Chyl is a Chinese-Canadian electronic musician. She was nominated for a Juno Award in the category Dance Recording of the Year for the album Dominate.
