= List of number-one dance hits (Canada) =

This is a list of number-one dance hits as recorded by RPM magazine's Top 30 Dance chart — a weekly national survey of popular songs in Canada dance clubs.

Below are links to lists showing the songs that have topped the chart. Dates shown represent "week-ending" Billboard issue dates. Note that no chart was published from January 1980 until September 3, 1988.

== 1970s ==
- 1976
- 1977
- 1978
- 1979

== 1980s ==
- 1988
- 1989

== 1990s ==
- 1990
- 1991
- 1992
- 1993
- 1994
- 1995
- 1996
- 1997
- 1998
- 1999

== 2000s ==
- 2000
