= You're a Superstar =

1998 single by Love Inc.

Single by Love Inc.

from the album Love Inc.
- Released: June 1998
- Length: 3:26
- Label: Vik.; BMG
- Songwriters: Vincent De Giorgio; Chris Sheppard; Brad Daymond
- Producers: Love Inc.; Peter Ries

Love Inc. singles chronology
"Broken Bones" (1998)	"You're a Superstar" (1998)	"Homeless" (1999)

"You're a Superstar" is a song by Canadian Eurodance group Love Inc. It was released in June 1998 as the second single from the album Love Inc., after "Broken Bones". "You're a Superstar" was Love Inc.'s biggest hit, peaking at number 13 on the Canadian RPM 100 Hit Tracks chart and number one on the RPM Dance Chart. It also peaked at number eight in Spain and number 23 in the Netherlands.

In the United Kingdom, the song was a commercial failure during its original release in 2000, but two years later, it was re-released and peaked at number seven for four weeks in December 2002 and January 2003. In Scotland, the song reached number two in early January 2003. Its success in the UK allowed the song to receive a platinum certification from the British Phonographic Industry (BPI) in 2024 for sales and streams exceeding 600,000.

In 2020, the song was used as a lipsync number in the first season finale episode of Canada's Drag Race, which was won by Priyanka. In the same year, Love Inc.'s Simone Denny appeared on CBC Television's annual New Year's Eve special, performing the song as part of Tyler Shaw's set.

In 2024, Denny as a solo artist released a country music cover of the song and an accompanying music video, both titled "Superstar".

== Music videos ==
The video, premiered on June 15, 1998, features group members Chris Sheppard and Brad Daymond arriving in a military-type vehicle (an ambulance-bodied Land Rover 101 Forward Control) and breaking into a top secret laboratory to rescue white rabbits used as test subjects with Simone Denny singing to the viewer, with a rabbit suit wearer carting rabbit cages labeled Elvis, Marilyn, Zsa Zsa and Jimi out of the facility and into the truck. The video ends with the rabbit suit wearer on top of the truck being driven away holding up two sparklers.

The country cover features Simone driving in a yellow 1973 Mustang convertible at Wasaga Beach in Simcoe County, Ontario.

== Track listings ==
Canadian maxi-CD single (1998)

1. "You're a Superstar" (City of Love radio mix) – 4:00
2. "You're a Superstar" (City of Love club mix) – 5:46
3. "You're a Superstar" (The Dogwhistle Soundsystem) – 7:05
4. "You're a Superstar" (Mono Inc. Love club edit) – 5:39

US CD single (1998)

1. "You're a Superstar" (radio mix) – 4:00
2. "You're a Superstar" (City of Love club mix) – 5:46
3. "You're a Superstar" (Ether Dub) – 7:33
4. "You're a Superstar" (Scotty Marz vocal mix) – 6:41
5. "You're a Superstar" (Scotty Marz Supa Dub) – 6:52

Spanish 12-inch vinyl (1999)

A1. "You're a Superstar" (Giorgio's Mix) – 5:30
A2. "You're a Superstar" (Miami Playa Mix) – 7:03
B1. "You're a Superstar" (5:30 A.M. Remix) – 7:23
B2. "Broken Bones" (Ruff Driverz vocal mix) – 6:48

UK CD single (2000)

1. "You're a Superstar" (original version)
2. "You're a Superstar" (Xenomania radio mix)
3. "You're a Superstar" (Wayne 6 Luvs Petra Mix)

UK CD single (2002)

1. "You're a Superstar" (radio edit) – 3:23
2. "You're a Superstar" (City of Love Mix) – 5:46
3. "You're a Superstar" (Pez Tellett Remix) – 4:51
4. "You're a Superstar" (Rezonance Q Remix) – 5:57

Australian maxi-CD single (2003)

1. "You're a Superstar" (radio edit '03) – 3:23
2. "You're a Superstar" (City of Love Mix) – 5:46
3. "You're a Superstar" (Pez Tellett Remix) – 4:51
4. "You're a Superstar" (Rezonance Q Remix) – 5:57
5. "You're a Superstar" (Wayne G Heaven Anthem Mix) – 9:37

== Charts ==
=== Weekly charts ===
Chart (1998–2000)	Peak position
Canada (Nielsen SoundScan)	19
Canada Top Singles (RPM)	13
Canada Adult Contemporary (RPM)	48
Canada Dance/Urban (RPM)	1
Ireland (IRMA)	33
Spain (AFYVE)	8
UK Singles (Official Charts)	91
US Dance Club Play (Billboard)	22
US Maxi-Singles Sales (Billboard)	47

Chart (2002–2003)	Peak position
Australia (ARIA)	57
Belgium (Ultratip Bubbling Under Flanders)	11
Europe (Eurochart Hot 100)	11
Ireland (IRMA)	10
Ireland Dance (IRMA)	1
Netherlands (Dutch Top 40)	23
Netherlands (Single Top 100)	48
Romania (Romanian Top 100)	54
Scottish Singles Sales (Official Charts)	2
UK Singles (Official Charts)	7
UK Dance (Official Charts)	2

=== Year-end charts ===
Chart (1998)	Position
Canada Top Singles (RPM)	46
Canada Dance (RPM)	3

Chart (2002)	Position
UK Singles (OCC)	145

Chart (2003)	Position
Ireland (IRMA)	65
UK Singles (OCC)	78

== Certifications ==
Region	Certification	Certified units/sales
Canada (Music Canada)	Gold	40,000^{‡}
United Kingdom (BPI)	Platinum	600,000^{‡}
^{‡} Sales+streaming figures based on certification alone.

== Release history ==
Region	Date	Format(s)	Label(s)	Ref.
Canada	June 1998	Maxi-CD	Vik.; BMG	
United States	1998	CD	Vik.; Logic; BMG	
United States	1999	Promo CD	Vik.; Logic; BMG	
United Kingdom	July 10, 2000	CD; cassette	Logic	
United Kingdom (re-release)	December 16, 2002	12-inch vinyl; CD	NuLife	
Australia (re-release)	February 24, 2003	CD	NuLife	
