= Look at Us (Sarina Paris song) =

2003 single by Sting

Single by Sarina Paris

from the album Sarina Paris
- Released: 1999
- Recorded: 1999
- Studio: CX (Milan, Italy)
- Genre: Dance-pop
- Length: 3:28
- Label: HQ; EMI; CX
- Songwriters: Charlie Marchino; Rosaria Parisi
- Producer: Charlie Marchino

Sarina Paris singles chronology
"Mystery Man" (1995)	"Look at Us" (1999)	"Just About Enough" (2000)

Audio
- "Look at Us" on YouTube

"Look at Us" is a song by Canadian singer Sarina Paris, written by Charlie Marchino and Rosaria Parisi and produced by Marchino. Recorded and released in 1999, "Look at Us" was later included on Paris's debut album, Sarina Paris, in 2001. Despite initially being unnoticed outside dance clubs, the song began to pick up radio airplay in 2000 and 2001 and eventually charted in several countries, including Australia, Canada, and the United States. The track was nominated for Best Dance Recording at the 2001 Juno Awards.

== Background and release ==
Sarina Paris first came to attention in dance clubs with her 1995 single "Mystery Man", but mainstream success failed to follow. In 1999, while performing in Italy, A&R executive Nico Spinosa recruited Paris and signed her to a record deal, allowing her to record "Look at Us". Following its European release the same year, it became a club hit in Europe and the United States. In July 2000, the song was serviced to US radio, but it failed to make an impact. However, when the music director of San Francisco's KYLD radio station, "Jazzy" Jim Archer, began to air the song in September, the 18–25 female demographic began requesting the song frequently, allowing the song to spread to other stations. The song was subsequently re-serviced to US contemporary hit radio on 12 February 2001.

By May 2001, 116 stations nationwide had playlisted the track. As a result, Paris recorded her self-titled debut album, which she finished in January 2001. In addition, Priority Records sent out promotional copies of Paris's next single, "Just About Enough", to dance clubs and mix-show DJs and sent Paris on tour. "Look at Us" was issued as a maxi-CD single in the US in March 2001 and was included as the opening track on Sarina Paris, which was released on 22 May 2001. In Australia, a CD single containing various remixes of "Look at Us" was issued on 8 July 2001. A music video was filmed to promote the single and was aired on MTV, MTV2, and Disney Channel. Paris also performed the song during the NBA All-Star weekend pre-game in February 2001 to a positive response.

== Reception ==
Critically, Liana Jonas of AllMusic called Paris's vocal performance "innocent and flavored with an electronica sensibility" but noted that the song's lyrics could easily be pasted over every other track on Sarina Paris. In 2001, the song was nominated for a Juno Award for Best Dance Recording at the 2001 ceremony, losing to Love Inc.'s "Into the Night". Commercially, "Look at Us" became a hit in several countries. In Canada, it reached number 19 on the RPM 100 Hit Tracks chart in July 2000. In the United States, it peaked at number 59 on the Billboard Hot 100, number 29 on the Top 40 Tracks chart, and number eight on the Maxi-Singles Sales chart. On the Rhythmic Top 40, the song peaked at number 23 and was the 72nd-most-successful track on rhythmic radio in 2001. According to Billboard, "Look at Us" was the 43rd-highest-selling physical single of the US the same year. On Australia's ARIA Singles Chart, the song debuted at number 39, its peak, on the week dated 22 July 2001 and spent five weeks within the top 50.

== Track listings ==
European CD single

1. "Look at Us" (radio edit) – 3:28
2. "Look at Us" (extended version) – 5:20

European maxi-CD single and Italian 12-inch single

1. "Look at Us" (extended version) – 5:20
2. "Look at Us" (radio edit) – 3:28
3. "Look at Us" (A Little Bit Faster version) – 4:32
4. "Look at Us" (A Little Bit Faster edit) – 3:20

US maxi-CD single

1. "Look at Us" (original radio edit) – 3:28
2. "Look at Us" (Beam & Yanou radio edit) – 3:38
3. "Look at Us" (Beam & Yanou club mix) – 5:43
4. "Look at Us" (Almighty remix) – 7:22
5. "Look at Us" (Chris "The Greek" Club Anthem) – 8:03

Australian CD single

1. "Look at Us" (radio edit) – 3:20
2. "Look at Us" (Beam & Yanou club mix) – 5:42
3. "Look at Us" (Almighty remix) – 7:22
4. "Look at Us" (Chris "The Greek" Club Anthem) – 8:23

== Credits and personnel ==
Credits are lifted from the Sarina Paris album booklet.

Studios

- Recorded and mixed at CX Studios (Milan, Italy) with MOTU digital audio equipment
- Mastered at Master Cutting Room (New York City)

Personnel

- Charlie Marchino – writing, production
- Rosaria Parisi – writing
- Andrea Negrinelli – recording, mixing
- Paolo Gozzetti – mixing
- Rick Essig – mastering

== Charts ==
=== Weekly charts ===
Chart (2000–2001)	Peak position
Australia (ARIA)	39
Canada Top Singles (RPM)	19
US Billboard Hot 100	59
US Maxi-Singles Sales (Billboard)	8
US Rhythmic Top 40 (Billboard)	23
US Top 40 Tracks (Billboard)	29

=== Year-end charts ===
Chart (2001)	Position
US Rhythmic Top 40 (Billboard)	72

== Release history ==
Region	Date	Format(s)	Label(s)	Ref.
Europe	1999	CD	HQ; EMI; CX	
United States	July 2000	Top 40; rhythm radio	Priority; Playland	
United States	12 February 2001	Top 40 radio (re-release)	Priority; Playland	
United States	March 2001	Maxi-CD	Priority; Playland	
Australia	9 July 2001	CD	EMI; Dance Factory	
