= Hey Everybody (DJ Company song) =

"Hey Everybody (Out of Control)"

Single by DJ Company

from the album The Album
- Released: 14 February 1994
- Genre: Eurodance
- Label: Epic Records, Dance Pool, Jam!
- Songwriters: Louis Lasky, Paul Strand, Stefan Benz
- Producers: Louis Lasky, Paul Strand, Stefan Benz

DJ Company singles chronology
"Hey Everybody (Out of Control)" (1994)	"Rhythm of Love" (1994)

"Hey Everybody (Out of Control)" is the debut single by German Eurodance project DJ Company. It was released under the record label Dance Pool in 1994, and charted at number 1 on the Canadian Dance chart for 3 weeks. It was released as a CD maxi-single and on Dance Pool Vol. 3 (a Canadian compilation). A remix CD was released the same year. The single features January Ordu as the lead vocalist, along with dancers/rappers Brian Thomas and Michael Fielder.

== Charts ==
Chart (1994)	Peak position
Canada (RPM Dance)	1
