= Eyes Cream =

Alter ego of Italian DJ Agostino Carollo

- Origin: Italy
- Genres: House
- Years active: 1999-present
- Labels: EMI / Everness
- Members: Agostino Carollo and Francesco Carollo
- Website: http://www.agocarollo.com

Eyes Cream is an alter ego of Italian dance music DJ/producer/composer/singer Agostino Carollo. In 2000 he hit number-one on the Hot Dance Music/Club Play chart with "Fly Away (Bye Bye)." This song was entirely written, produced, performed and sung by himself. The official videoclip was shot in Milano (Italy) and also featured his brother Francesco. He hit the dance chart Top 10 again in 2002 with "Open Up Your Mind," which peaked at number 10, featuring the vocals of Stephanie Haley.

== Discography ==
=== Singles ===
Year	Single	Peak chart positions				Album
Year	Single	CAN Dance	FRA	UK	U.S. Dance	Album
1999	"Fly Away (Bye Bye)"	1	67	53	1	Singles only
1999	"Magdalena"	—	—	—	—	Singles only
2002	"Open Up Your Mind"	—	—	—	10	Singles only
"—" denotes releases that did not chart

== See also ==
- List of number-one dance hits (United States)
- List of artists who reached number one on the US Dance chart
