= Rhythm of Love (DJ Company song) =

Single by DJ Company

from the album The Album
- Released: 27 September 1994
- Genre: Eurodance
- Length: 3:46
- Label: Sony, Crave Records, Dance Pool, Jam!
- Songwriter(s): Louis Lasky, Paul Strand, Stefan Benz
- Producer(s): Louis Lasky, Paul Strand, Stefan Benz

DJ Company singles chronology
"Hey Everybody" (1994)	"Rhythm of Love" (1994)	"Fly Away" (1994)

"Rhythm of Love" is a song by German Eurodance group DJ Company, released in 1994. Vocals were provided by January Ordu and rappers Brian Thomas and Michael Fielder. The song appeared on the compilation Euro Dance Pool. In 1997, a new version of "Rhythm of Love" was created with more vocals and no rapping. It was released in the U.S. and reached No. 53 on the Billboard Hot 100 and No. 8 on the Dance Maxi Single Sales chart.

== Charts ==
Chart (1994)	Peak position
Canada Dance (RPM)	1

Chart (1997)	Peak position
US Billboard Hot 100	53
US Billboard Hot Dance Music/Maxi-Singles Sales	8
