= Sarina Paris =

Canadian singer (born 1973)

- Born: December 22, 1973 (age 52)
- Origin: Toronto, Canada
- Genre: Eurodance
- Occupation: Singer
- Instrument: Vocals
- Years active: 1995–2005, 2011–present
- Labels: Capitol, Priority, Sony Music Italy

Sarina Paris (born December 22, 1973) is a Canadian singer, best known for her international dance-club hits "Look at Us" (1999) and "Just About Enough" (2000).

== Early life ==
Born on December 22, 1973, Paris is of Italian descent and grew up in Toronto in a working-class family who were originally from Italy. She began singing in preschool in school plays and church choir. She moved back to Italy in 1996 after her mother died to get in touch with her ancestral roots.

== Career ==
=== 1990s ===
In 1995, Paris' debut song "Mystery Man" was released in Canada. In 1996 during Italian singing contests, she was discovered by Italian manager/producer Vince Tempera (Kill Bill) who invited her to work alongside some of the most respected and talented producers and musicians from La Scala Milano. Maestro Tempera invited Sarina to collaborate in music festivals across Italy where Sarina sang songs from soundtracks backed by twelve-piece orchestra. Sarina later met musician and band leader Walter Muto who invited her to join his band 'Rock for fun', an educational band covering the history of rock music where Sarina sang in the 'women in rock' segment and toured Italy and Spain.

Sarina also become a member of the Gam Gam Project alongside dance producers Max Monti and Mauro Pilato in Rimini, Italy where she toured Northern Italy with the GamGam children.

A year later she moved to Milan where she worked as a receptionist at a CX music publishing and production where she was discovered by Charlie Marchino and Nico Spinosa of EMI's Italian division, and began her career as an international recording artist.

=== 2000s ===
Her initial single, "Look at Us", charted on the Billboard Hot 100 in 2001, but did not reach the Top 40. The song did make it onto the Rhythmic Top 40. It also became a dance-club hit internationally. As a result of the success, she was signed to the U.S. label Priority Records.

In 2001, she released her debut album, Sarina Paris, composed of songs she co-wrote, with the exception of a cover version of Cyndi Lauper's "True Colors". In an interview, she said the album was "nothing too intellectual—just music to make you happy and to make you feel good" and that "I wanted to make an album that kids could listen to with their parents. Songs that were clubby for mom, but weren't x-rated so the kids could play and dance along with." She received feedback from her 14-year-old niece as she wrote and recorded. Indeed, the record label's target demographic was noted to be 12- to 25-year-old women. The single "Just About Enough" was released as a club-exclusive single. She released another dance track, "This Is My Life", found exclusively on a Canadian dance compilation Euro Mix 5 through SPG Records. In 2000 "Do You Love Somebody" was released exclusively on the compilation Dancemania x7 in Japan under Toshiba/EMI record label.

In 2002, the song "Look at Us (Daddy DJ Mix)" was featured in DDRMAX2 Dance Dance Revolution 7thMix for the Japanese arcade and PlayStation 2. In 2005, the song was featured in Dance Dance Revolution Extreme 2 for the North American PlayStation 2.

Paris toured with La Toya Jackson in Hawaii in May 2004. For the rest of the 2000s, her music career had been mostly on hold, although she released a new song, "You Are My Valentine", available only on EuroBeats Vol. 3.

=== Currently ===
On May 27, 2011, nearly marking the tenth anniversary of "Look at Us", Paris released the single "Sophisticated". Paris would release three new singles in 2019, "Angel Inside", "Believe in Love" and "Where Are You Now".

Sarina continues to write songs for TV programs in Italy and film and continues to sing with jazz bands. She continues to write and produce electronic music.

== Discography ==
=== Studio albums ===
- Sarina Paris (2001)

=== Singles ===
List of singles, with selected chart positions
Title	Year	Peak chart positions			Album
Title	Year	CAN	AUS	US	Album
"Mystery Man"	1995	—	—	—	Non-album single
"Look at Us"	1999	23	39	59	Sarina Paris
"Just About Enough"	2000	—	—	—	Sarina Paris
"You Are My Valentine"	2003	—	—	—	Non-album singles
"Sophisticated"	2011	—	—	—	Non-album singles
"Angel Inside"	2019	—	—	—	Non-album singles
"Believe in Love"	2019	—	—	—	Non-album singles
"Where Are You Now"	2019	—	—	—	Non-album singles
