= Thunderheist (album) =

Album by Thunderheist

Studio album by Thunderheist
- Released: March 31, 2009
- Genre: Hip hop, ghettotech
- Length: 46:51
- Label: Big Dada

Professional ratings
Aggregate scores
Source	Rating
Metacritic	64/100
Review scores
Source	Rating
AllMusic	2.5/5 stars
NME	3.5/5 stars
Pitchfork	4.4/10
PopMatters	7/10 stars
Slant Magazine	3/5 stars
Spin	favorable

Thunderheist is the only studio album from Canadian electro hop duo of the same name. It was released in North America on March 31, 2009.

== Critical reception ==
At Metacritic, which assigns a weighted average score out of 100 to reviews from mainstream critics, the album received an average score of 64% based on 11 reviews, indicating "generally favorable reviews".

== Track listing ==
No.	Title	Length
1.	"Sweet 16"	3:46
2.	"Nothing 2 Step 2"	4:00
3.	"Jerk It"	3:51
4.	"LBG (Little Booty Girl)"	4:24
5.	"Bubblegum"	3:56
6.	"Slow Roll"	3:16
7.	"Space Cowboy"	4:29
8.	"The Party After"	3:29
9.	"Freddie"	4:22
10.	"Do the Right Thing"	3:06
11.	"Red Whine"	2:20
12.	"Cruise Low"	3:12
13.	"Anthem"	2:31

== Personnel ==
- Isis Salam – vocals
- Grahm Zilla – synths, programming
