= Taboo (group) =

Eurodance group formed in Germany

- Origin: Germany
- Genres: Eurodance
- Years active: 1995
- Labels: Dance Pool
- Past members: Nico Dee-Brunetti; Piero Brunetti

Taboo was a Eurodance group formed in Germany. It was created by producers Nico Dee-Brunetti and Piero Brunetti. They released one single, "I Dream of You Tonight (Bab Ba Ba Bab)". It peaked at number 92 on the German Singles Chart and reached number-one on the RPM Dance Chart in Canada.

== Discography ==
=== Singles ===
Year	Single	Peak chart positions		Album
Year	Single	CAN Dance	GER	Album
1995	"I Dream of You Tonight (Bab Ba Ba Bab)"	1	92	Single only
"—" denotes releases that did not chart
