= Joée =

Canadian dance musician

- Born: Joey DeSimone; 1973 (age 52–53); Toronto, Ontario, Canada
- Genres: Dance
- Occupations: Singer, songwriter
- Years active: 1995–2002

Joée (born Joey DeSimone) is a Canadian dance musician who enjoyed success in the late 1990s.

== Musical career ==
Joée scored several hits on the Canadian Singles Chart, including "Angel" and "If I Could", along with "Do You Right" in 1998 and "Arriba" in 1999. He released his debut album Truth in 1998, and was nominated for a Juno Award in 2000 for Best Dance Recording. With John Marmora, Joée received a 2001 SOCAN award for best dance music.

A follow-up self-titled album was released in 2002 on Erotico Music (distributed by Universal Music Canada).

== Discography ==
=== Studio albums ===
Title	Details	Peak chart positions
Title	Details	CAN
Intonation feat. Joée – Just a Taste...	Release date: 1995; Label: Quality Music; Formats: CD	—
Truth	Release date: June 1998; Label: Popular Records; Formats: CD	56
Joée	Release date: 2002; Label: Erotico Music; Formats: CD	—
A Decade of Dance	Release date: 2004; Label: SPG Music; Formats: CD	—
"—" denotes releases that did not chart

=== Singles ===
Year	Title	Peak chart positions			Album
Year	Title	CAN	AUS	US	Album
1995	"(I Just) Died In Your Arms" (with Intonation)	—	—	86	Just a Taste... (with Intonation)
1997	"Holdin' On"	—	—	—	Truth
1997	"Angel"	6	—	—	Truth
1998	"If I Could"	15	—	—	Truth
1999	"Do You Right"	27	—	—	Truth
1999	"Arriba"	6	92	—	Truth
2000	"I Don't Believe You"	5	—	—	Single only
2002	"Does That Make You Happy?"	—	—	—	Joée
2002	"Sunshine"	—	—	—	Joée
"—" denotes releases that did not chart
