= First Base (group) =

German Eurodance group

- First Base with their crew (1997)

Background information
- Origin: Frankfurt am Main, Germany
- Genre: Eurodance
- Years active: 1995–1999
- Labels: Beam, BMG Canada
- Past members: Kristina Safrany; Michael Williams; Michael Gleim

First Base was a German Eurodance group formed in 1995. It was created by producer Michael Gleim a.k.a. DJ Wondermike and featured vocalist Kristina "Tina" Safrany a.k.a. Viktoria and rapper Michael Williams a.k.a. MC Flash. They released three singles, "Love is Paradise", "Can You Keep a Secret", and "Follow Me". The group was highly successful in Canada, with their first two singles reaching number-one on the Canadian RPM Dance Chart and the latter peaking at number 6.

Kristina "Tina" Safrany died in Germany on 26 September 2026, at the age of 54.

== Discography ==
=== Singles ===
Year	Single	Peak chart positions		Album
Year	Single	CAN	CAN Dance	Album
1995	"Love is Paradise"		1	Single only
1996	"Can You Keep a Secret"	51	1	Single only
1999	"Follow Me"		6	Single only
"—" denotes releases that did not chart
