= BKS (band) =

Canadian techno group

- Origin: Canada
- Genres: Techno, Eurodance
- Years active: 1990–1997
- Past members: Chris Sheppard; Hennie Bekker; Greg Kavanagh

BKS was a Canadian techno group created by radio DJ Chris Sheppard, with Hennie Bekker and Greg Kavanagh (BKS = Bekker, Kavanagh, Sheppard). They were best known for collaborating with hockey personality Don Cherry to create the song "Rock Em Sock Em Techno".

== History ==
BKS recorded three albums of contemporary techno. Their debut album, For Those About to Rave... We Salute You, was released in 1992. The album sold 9,000 copies by January 1993. In 1993, BKS worked with Don Cherry on the song "Rock Em Sock Em Techno". The resulting video was named by MuchMusic as the worst video of 1993; however, the video sold in excess of 550,000 copies.

Also in 1993, the group released the single "Dreamcatcher", which was a hit on the Canadian Dance chart. The song's music video was nominated for a MuchMusic Video Award for "Best Dance Music Video". The group's other hits included "Take Control" and "The Square Dance Song" (a collaboration with Ashley MacIsaac). Their singles "I'm in Love with You" and "Living in Ecstasy", were both club and radio mix show hits. Their single "Astroplane" won a Juno Award in 1996. BKS songs were included on DJ and MuchMusic promoted CD compilations, including Pirate Radio Volume 5.

BKS disbanded in 1997.

== Discography ==
=== Studio albums ===
Title	Details	Peak chart positions
Title	Details	CAN
For Those About to Rave... We Salute You	Release date: August 24, 1992; Label: Quality Records; Formats: CD	—
Dreamcatcher	Release date: September 1, 1993; Label: Quality Records; Formats: CD	—
Astroplane	Release date: June 20, 1996; Label: Quality Records; Formats: CD	—
"—" denotes releases that did not chart

=== Singles ===
Year	Song	Peak positions			Album
Year	Song	CAN	CAN Dance	US Dance	Album
1992	"Living in Ecstasy"	—	—	24	For Those About to Rave... We Salute You
1992	"Talkin' bout Love"	—	—	—	For Those About to Rave... We Salute You
1993	"Dreamcatcher / I'm in Love with You"	—	4	—	Dreamcatcher
1995	"Take Control"	—	7	—	Astroplane
1995	"The Square Dance Song" (featuring Ashley MacIsaac)	—	18	—	Astroplane
1996	"Astroplane"	33	7	—	Astroplane
1997	"4 Your Love"	—	2	—	Astroplane
"—" denotes a release that did not chart.

== See also ==
- Love Inc.
