= Thunderheist =

Canadian electronic music duo

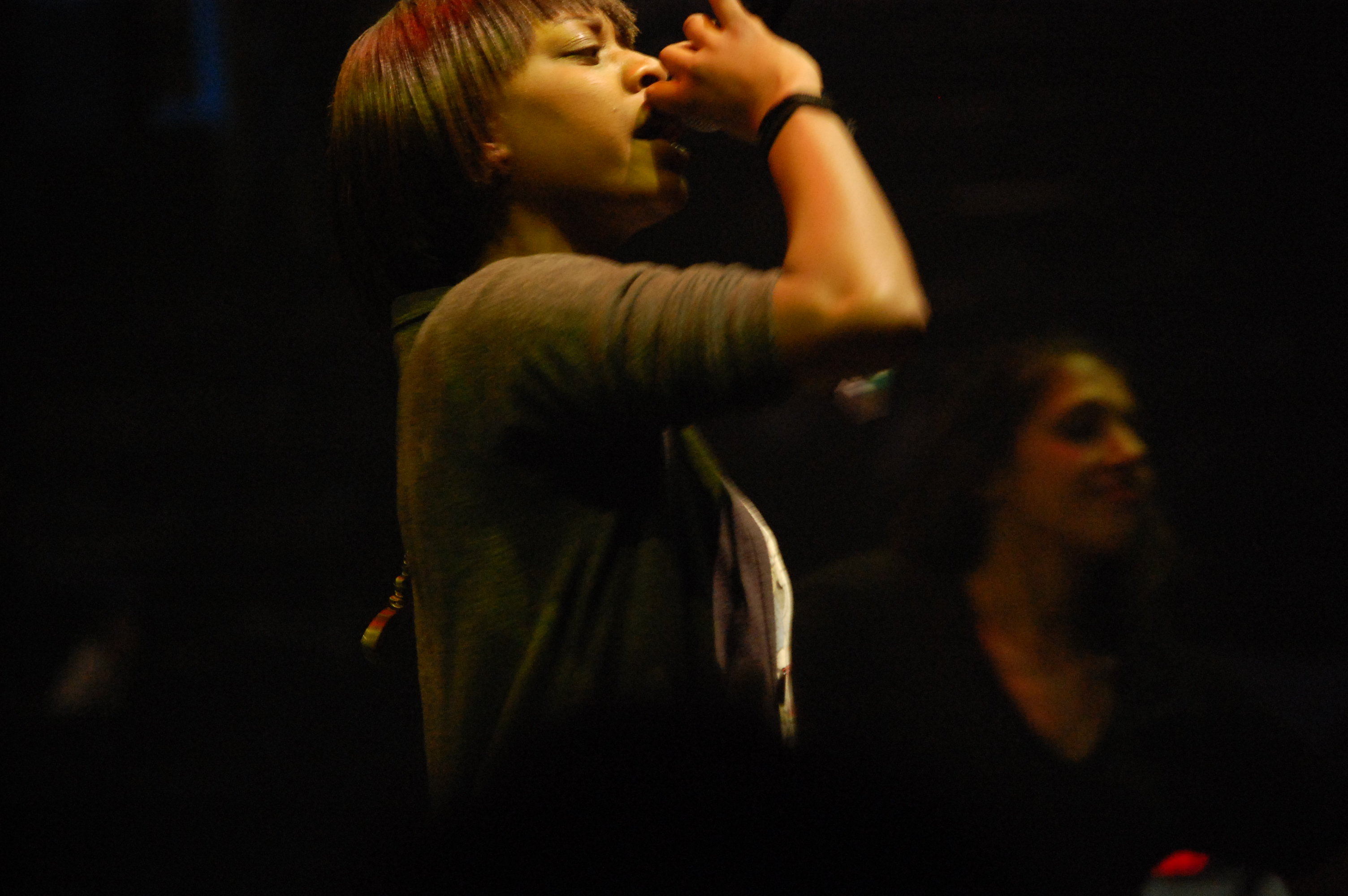
- Thunderheist performing in 2009

Background information
- Origin: Toronto, Montreal
- Genres: Electropop, Dance, Ghettotech
- Instruments: Turntables, Electronic instrumentation/programming
- Years active: 2005–2010
- Labels: Big Dada
- Members: Omolola Isis Salam; Graham Bertie

Thunderheist was an electronic music duo from Toronto, Ontario and Montreal, Quebec in Canada. Thunderheist was made up of producer Graham Bertie (Grahmzilla) and Omolola Isis Salam (Isis). The two began collaborating before they had ever met in person, sending MP3 files to each other over the Internet.

They were signed to and released one album on Big Dada. Thunderheist was founded in 2005 by Graham as an anonymous dance music side-project to his more hip-hop leanings as Metrix. They became a duo in August 2006 when Graham inadvertently sent Omolola a remix he was working on for a Spank Rock remix competition and she recorded a rap over it. They've received moderate popularity for their track "Jerk It" featured in the 2008 film The Wrestler. Thunderheist was selected as the X3 Artist of the month by Aux.tv, CBC Radio 3 and Exclaim! Magazine for April 2009. Their self-titled full-length was released March 31, 2009. They were nominated for a 2010 Juno Award in the Dance Recording of the Year category.

In 2010, Thunderheist confirmed on their website that they had gone their separate ways.

== Discography ==
=== Albums ===
- Thunderheist (March 31, 2009)

=== Singles ===
- "Bubblegum" (October 2007)
- "Jerk It" (July 2008)
- "Sweet 16" (2009)
- "Nothing 2 Step 2" (2009)
- "LBG (Little Booty Girl)" (November 2009)
