= DJ Company =

German Eurodance group

- Origin: Berlin, Germany
- Genre: Eurodance
- Years active: 1993–1998
- Past members: Brian Thomas; January Ordu; Michael Fielder

DJ Company was a German Eurodance and dance-pop trio consisting of Paul Strand, Stefan Benz and Louis Lasky.

== Musical career ==
DJ Company had one chart hit in the United States, "Rhythm of Love", which spent 19 weeks on the Billboard Hot 100, peaking at number 53 in 1997. Their version of Alphaville's "Forever Young" also received modest airplay that year. DJ Company's debut album, Rhythm of Love, sold modestly.

Their works have appeared on many compilations since 1994. "Hey Everybody" was featured on Dance Pool Vol. 3 (1994), Mr Music Hits 6/94 (1994), The House of Trance (1994), Larry Präsentiert: Musketier Hits 94 (1994), Dance Now! (1994), and Supersonic Megadance Vol 1 (1995). "Rhythm of Love" was featured on Dance Now! Vol. 8 (1994), Shark Attack Five (1994), Deep Magic Dance 30 (1994), Euro Dance Pool (1995), Dancin Floor (1995), If You Love Dance (1996), All Stars Dance Hits 97 (1997), Utopia (1997), Welcome To The Epidrome (1998), and Dance Now! 9 (1998). "Cybersex-Lovegame" was featured on Dance Now! 11 (1995) and Dancemania 9 (1998).

== Ordu's death ==
Former member January Ordu died on June 26, 2026 at age 55. Although the exact cause of her death was not publicly disclosed by her family, her death was widely mourned by the Berlin music community, where her current group, Free Spiritz, was based.

== Discography ==
=== Studio albums ===
Year	Album details
The Album	Release date: November, 1995; Label: Dance Pool, Jam! (Canada)
Rhythm of Love	Release date: September 30, 1997; Label: Sony (US)

=== Singles ===
Year	Single	Peak chart positions	
Year	Single	CAN Dance	U.S.
1994	"Hey Everybody"	1	—
1994	"Rhythm of Love"	1	—
1995	"Fly Away"	—	—
1995	"Cybersex-Lovegame"	—	—
1995	"Holiday in the Land of Love"	—	—
1997	"Rhythm of Love" (re-release)	—	53
1997	"Forever Young"	—	—
"—" denotes releases that did not chart

== Other singles ==
=== As Arena ===
- 1994 - Fly Away
