= Love Inc. (group) =

Canadian dance music band

- Origin: Toronto, Ontario, Canada
- Genres: House, Eurodance
- Years active: 1997–2000, 2002–2003
- Label: VIK/RCA
- Past members: Chris Sheppard; Brad Daymond; Simone Denny

Love Inc. were a Canadian Eurodance music group from Toronto, Ontario. The group was formed by DJ/remixer/producers Chris Sheppard and Brad Daymond, with Simone Denny on vocals.

== Musical career ==
Sheppard and Denny previously worked together in dance outfit BKS.

The group scored its first major hit on the Canadian pop chart with "Broken Bones", which won Best Video at the 1998 MuchMusic Video Awards. "Broken Bones" peaked at number 6 (Canadian Airplay) and #23 (Top 100 singles) in 1998. The group performed it during the halftime show at the 86th Grey Cup.

It was followed that same year by "You're a Superstar". "You're a Superstar" also became the band's only hit in the United States, where it peaked at number 22 on the Billboard Hot Dance Music/Club Play chart in 1999. The singles "Who Do You Love" and "Homeless" followed in 1999.

In 1999, Daymond left the group to pursue a remix and production career with Alex Greggs as "Riprock & Alex G". After Love Inc.'s self-titled album was released, Sheppard and Denny continued as a duo and in 2000 released Into the Night, which included the title tracks, "Come On (It's Only Love)" and "Here Comes the Sunshine". It would also be their last album. Five singles in total reached the # 1 position on the Canadian Dance Charts published by the now-defunct publications The Record and RPM Magazine.

The group's debut album remains the only dance album created domestically in Canada to achieve platinum certification (sales over 100,000 units).

Love Inc. were also aided by Frankfurt-based pop dance innovator Peter Ries, who co-produced both albums with the band. Other participants included composer Vincent DeGiorgio and Germany's Doug Laurent and award-winning songwriter/artist Dan Hill.

A few years after their break up, they would achieve success overseas when "You're a Superstar" and "Broken Bones" became hits in the UK and Ireland. "You're a Superstar" spent four weeks at number 7 in the UK Singles Chart in December 2002, and "Broken Bones" reached number 8 in May 2003. "Do Ya (Feel The Love)", co-written with Ms. Denny, was also featured on the initial Queer As Folk soundtrack, released on RCA Victor worldwide. You're a Superstar was featured on the Christmas special series finale of The Office as music in the background.

In 2003, Denny provided the vocals for Widelife's track "All Things (Just Keep Getting Better)", the theme from Queer Eye For The Straight Guy.

In 2013, Denny returned to performing with a touring version of Love Inc., this time billing themselves as "Love Inc. Featuring Simone Denny," performing the band's songs at nightclubs across Canada.

Brad Daymond (born Bradley Daymond Ralph on February 22, 1970, in Mississauga, Ontario, Canada) died on August 3, 2018, from complications after a cardiac arrest he had suffered three months earlier, at the age of 48.

An unrelated band of the same name released a single called "Love is the Message" in 1991, which in February of that year charted for three weeks, peaking at number 59 on the UK Singles Chart.

== Legacy ==
- "Broken Bones" would be used as a sampled track on Canadian rapper Belly's 2011 single "Purple Drugs," using the main lyrics from "Broken Bones" ("...Take a ride on a purple airplane, honey I don't know when I'll be back again") as the basis for the song.

== Discography ==
=== Studio albums ===
Title	Details	Peak chart positions	Certifications
Title	Details	CAN	Certifications
Love Inc.	Release date: 1998; Label: BMG Music Canada; Formats: CD	33	MC: Platinum
Into the Night	Release date: August 29, 2000; Label: BMG Music Canada; Formats: CD	46	

=== Singles ===
Year	Single	Peak chart positions						Certifications	Album
Year	Single	CAN	CAN Dance	AUS	NED	UK	US Dance	Certifications	Album
1997	"Broken Bones"	23	1	52	—	8	—	MC: Gold	Love Inc.
1998	"You're a Superstar"	13	1	57	23	7	22	MC: Gold; BPI: Platinum	Love Inc.
1998	"Homeless"	21	1	—	—	—	—		Love Inc.
1999	"Who Do U Love"	18	1	—	—	—	—		Love Inc.
2000	"Come On (It's Only Love)"	—	—	—	—	—	—		Into the Night
2000	"Here Comes the Sunshine"	14 (Note: "Here Comes the Sunshine" reached number 14 when RPM ceased publication in November 2000.)	1	—	—	—	—		Into the Night
2000	"Into the Night"	—	—	—	—	39	—		Into the Night
"—" denotes releases that did not chart
