= Canadian dance chart =

1976 chart over top 30 Disco Playlist

The Canadian dance chart was first known to be published on November 13, 1976, by RPM magazine under the name Top 30 Disco Playlist. The song which held the number-one spot on this first chart was "Keep It Comin' Love / I'm Your Boogie Man" by KC and the Sunshine Band. No chart was published from January 1980 until September 3, 1988. The final archived chart was under the name Top 30 Dance and was published on October 16, 2000, three weeks before the magazine ceased publication. The song which held the number-one spot on the final archived chart was "Here Comes the Sunshine" by Love Inc.

== See also ==
- List of number-one dance hits (Canada)
