= Juno Awards of 1989 =

Canadian music awards ceremony

- Date: 12 March 1989
- Venue: O'Keefe Centre, Toronto, Ontario
- Hosted by: André-Philippe Gagnon

Television/radio coverage
- Network: CBC

The Juno Awards of 1989, representing Canadian music industry achievements of the previous year, were awarded on 12 March 1989 in Toronto at a ceremony in the O'Keefe Centre. André-Philippe Gagnon was the host for the ceremonies, which were broadcast on CBC Television.

Blue Rodeo won in three of its five nominations: Best Group, Best Single and Best Video. k.d. lang and Robbie Robertson were also notable winners in 1989.

The previous Juno Awards ceremonies were conducted on 2 November 1987. There was no awards event in 1988 due to a decision to restore the Juno scheduling to the earlier portion of each year. The awards had been conducted early each year from its 1970 inception until 1984.

== Nominees and winners ==
=== Canadian Entertainer of the Year ===
(This award was chosen by a national poll rather than by Juno organisers CARAS.)

Winner: Glass Tiger

Other Nominees:

- Bryan Adams
- Barney Bentall and the Legendary Hearts
- Blue Rodeo
- Tom Cochrane & Red Rider
- Bruce Cockburn
- Leonard Cohen
- Colin James
- k.d. lang
- Robbie Robertson

=== Best Female Vocalist ===
Winner: Céline Dion

Other Nominees:

- Johanne Blouin
- k.d. lang
- Rita MacNeil
- Anne Murray

=== Best Male Vocalist ===
Winner: Robbie Robertson

Other Nominees:

- Bruce Cockburn
- Leonard Cohen
- David Wilcox
- Neil Young

=== Most Promising Female Vocalist of the Year ===
Winner: Sass Jordan

Other Nominees:

- Candi
- Patti Jannetta
- Lisa Lougheed
- Michelle Wright

=== Most Promising Male Vocalist of the Year ===
Winner: Colin James

Other Nominees:

- Art Bergmann
- Michael Breen
- Andrew Cash
- Jeff Healey

=== Best Group ===
Winner: Blue Rodeo

Other Nominees:

- Glass Tiger
- Honeymoon Suite
- Rush
- Tom Cochrane & Red Rider

=== Most Promising Group of the Year ===
Winner: Barney Bentall and the Legendary Hearts

Other Nominees:

- 54-40
- The Jitters
- The Northern Pikes
- The Pursuit of Happiness

=== Composer of the Year ===
Winner: Tom Cochrane

Other Nominees:

- Jim Cuddy and Greg Keelor
- David Foster
- Rita MacNeil
- Jim Vallance

=== Country Female Vocalist of the Year ===
Winner: k.d. lang

Other Nominees:

- Carroll Baker
- Sherry Kean
- Anne Murray
- Michelle Wright

=== Country Male Vocalist of the Year ===
Winner: Murray McLauchlan

Other Nominees:

- George Fox
- Matt Minglewood
- Patrick Norman
- Ian Tyson

=== Instrumental Artist of the Year ===
Winner: David Foster

Other Nominees:

- Canadian Brass
- Manteca
- Frank Mills
- Zamfir

=== International Entertainer of the Year ===
Winner: U2

Other Nominees:

- Crowded House
- INXS
- Michael Jackson
- George Michael

=== Producer of the Year ===
Winner: Daniel Lanois and Robbie Robertson, "Showdown at Big Sky" & "Somewhere Down the Crazy River" from Robbie Robertson by Robbie Robertson

Other Nominees:

- Bruce Fairbairn, "The Movie" from Permanent Vacation by Aerosmith & "Stick to Your Guns" from New Jersey by Bon Jovi
- David Foster, "Winter Games" from The Symphony Sessions by David Foster
- Jonathan Goldsmith and Kerry Crawford, "Purple Haze" & "Sempre Nel Mio Cuore" from Shaking the Pumpkin by Hugh Marsh
- Jim Vallance, "Diamond Sun" from Diamond Sun by Glass Tiger

=== Recording Engineer of the Year ===
Winner: Mike Fraser, "Calling America" & "Different Drummer" from Victory Day by Tom Cochrane&Red Rider

Other Nominees:

- Pat Glover, "Paradiso" by Skywalk
- Noel Golden and Ed Stone, "Never Say Never" from Surveillance by Triumph & "Dance Desire" from Don't Just Stand There by Haywire
- Paul Northfield, "Diamond Sun" & "I'm Still Searching" from Diamond Sun by Glass Tiger
- Bob Rock, "Bad Medicine" from New Jersey by Bon Jovi

=== Canadian Music Hall of Fame ===
Winner: The Band

=== Walt Grealis Special Achievement Award ===
Winner: Sam Sniderman

=== Lifetime Achievement Award ===
Winner: Pierre Juneau

== Nominated and winning albums ==
=== Album of the Year ===
Winner: Robbie Robertson - Robbie Robertson

Other Nominees:

- Diamond Sun - Glass Tiger
- Outskirts - Blue Rodeo
- Racing After Midnight - Honeymoon Suite
- Reason to Believe - Rita MacNeil

=== Best Children's Album ===
Winner (tied): Fred Penner's Place - Fred Penner and Lullaby Berceuse - Connie Kaldor and Carmen Campagne

Other Nominees:

- Diamond and Dragons - Charlotte Diamond
- Qu'il y ait toujours le soleil - Charlotte Diamond
- Mr Bach Comes to Call - Susan Hammond
- Le loup de nord - Matt Maxwell
- The Orchestra - Toronto Philharmonic Orchestra

=== Best Classical Album: Solo or Chamber Ensemble ===
Winner: Schubert: Arpeggione Sonata - Ofra Harnoy

Other Nominees:

- Beethoven: Music for Cello and Piano - Desmond Hoebig and Andrew Tunis
- Chopin: Piano Works - Jon Kimura Parker
- Masters of the German Baroque - Tafelmusik Baroque Soloists
- Mozart: Piano Pieces - Jane Coop
- Wagner, Francaix, Dvorak - Canadian Chamber Ensemble and Raffi Armenian

=== Best Classical Album (Large Ensemble) ===
Winner: Bartók: Concerto for Orchestra, Music for Strings, Percussion and Celesta - Montreal Symphony Orchestra, Charles Dutoit conductor

Other Nominees:

- Berlioz: Harold in Italy, Rob Roy and Corsaire Overtures - Montreal Symphony Orchestra, Charles Dutoit conductor
- Fauro: Requiem - Montreal Symphony Orchestra, Charles Dutoit conductor
- Handel: Messiah - Toronto Symphony Orchestra, Andrew Davis conductor
- Mussorgsky: Pictures at an Exhibition, Night on Bare Mountain - Montreal Symphony Orchestra, Charles Dutoit conductor

=== Best Album Graphics ===
Winner: Hugh Syme, Levity by Ian Thomas

Other Nominees:

- Taras Chornowol, Beyond Benghazi by Paul Cram Orchestra
- J. Don Blair, Celebration by various artists
- Thomas Balint, Vertigo Tango by The Spoons
- James O'Mara, Walking Through Walls by Body Electric

=== International Album of the Year ===
Winner: Dirty Dancing soundtrack - various artists

Other Nominees:

- Bad - Michael Jackson
- Cocktail - Various Artists
- Faith - George Michael
- Hysteria - Def Leppard

=== Best Jazz Album ===
Winner: Looking Up - The Hugh Fraser Quintet

Other Nominees:

- Beyond Benghazi - Paul Cram Orchestra
- Contredanse - Karen Young and Michael Donato
- In Dew Time - Jane Bunnett
- Jean Beaudet Quartet - Jean Beaudet Quartet

=== Best Roots & Traditional Album ===
Winner: The Return of the Formerly Brothers - Amos Garrett, Doug Sahm and Gene Taylor

Other Nominees:

- Bop 'Til I Drop - Downchild Blues Band
- King Biscuit Boy aka Richard Newell - King Biscuit Boy
- Labour Day - Spirit of the West
- Swinging on a Star - Murray McLauchlan

== Nominated and winning releases ==
=== Single of the Year ===
Winner: "Try" - Blue Rodeo

Other Nominees:

- "Diamond Sun" - Glass Tiger
- "When a Man Loves a Woman" - Luba
- "Pop Goes the World" - Men Without Hats
- "Hands Up (Give Me Your Heart)" - Sway

=== Best Classical Composition ===
Winner: Songs of Paradise - Alexina Louie

- Concerto for Harpsichord and Eight Wind Instruments - R. Murray Schafer
- River of Fire - Brian Cherney
- Siddartha - Claude Vivier
- Symphonie No 3 - Jacques Hétu

=== International Single of the Year ===
Winner: "Pump Up the Volume" - MARRS

Other Nominees:

- "Faith" - George Michael
- "A Groovy Kind of Love" - Phil Collins
- "I Think We're Alone Now" - Tiffany
- "The Locomotion" - Kylie Minogue

=== Best R&B/Soul Recording of the Year ===
Winner: Angel - Erroll Starr

Other Nominees:

- Crying For Love - Lorraine Scott
- Dancing Under a Latin Moon - Candi
- Private Property - Liberty Silver
- Secret Love - Debbie Johnson and Demo Cates

=== Best Reggae/Calypso Recording ===
Winner: Conditions Critical - Lillian Allen

Other Nominees:

- Give Peace a Chance - Errol Blackwood
- I Like Calypso - Elsworth James
- Shadrock - Chester Miller
- War on Drugs - Devon Haughton

=== Best Video ===
Winner: Michael Buckley, "Try" - Blue Rodeo

Other Nominees:

- Ron Berti, "Wait for Me" - The Northern Pikes
- James O'Mara and Kate Ryan, "Our Little Secret" - Art Bergmann
- Donald Robertson, "Ingrid and the Footman" - Jane Siberry
- Jean-Marc Pisapia, "Ordinary People" - The Box
