= Juno Awards of 1993 =

Canadian music awards ceremony

- Date: 21 March 1993
- Venue: O'Keefe Centre, Toronto, Ontario
- Hosted by: Celine Dion

Television/radio coverage
- Network: CBC

The Juno Awards of 1993, representing Canadian music industry achievements of the previous year, were awarded on 21 March 1993 in Toronto at a ceremony in the O'Keefe Centre. Celine Dion was the host for the ceremonies, which were broadcast on CBC Television at 8 pm Toronto time. This year, all performers at the ceremonies would be Canadians, in contrast to some ceremonies in previous years.

Nominations were announced 9 February 1993. Celine Dion received 7 nominations, tying the record set by Bryan Adams at the 1992 awards. Bryan Adams and Tom Cochrane were prominent male nominees this year.

== Nominees and winners ==
=== Canadian Entertainer of the Year ===
This award was chosen by a national poll rather than by Juno organisers CARAS.

Winner: The Tragically Hip

Other Nominees:

- Bryan Adams
- Barenaked Ladies
- Tom Cochrane
- Celine Dion

=== Best Female Vocalist ===
Winner: Celine Dion

Other Nominees:

- Sass Jordan
- k.d. lang
- Rita MacNeil
- Michelle Wright

=== Best Male Vocalist ===
Presented by Sebastian Bach.

Winner: Leonard Cohen

Other Nominees:

- Corey Hart
- Francis Martin
- Kim Mitchell
- Neil Young

=== Most Promising Female Vocalist ===
Winner: Julie Masse

Other Nominees:

- Lisa Brokop
- Sue Foley
- Sofia Shinas
- Priscilla Wright

=== Most Promising Male Vocalist ===
Winner: John Bottomley

Other Nominees:

- Devon
- Steve Fox
- John McDermott
- Don Neilson

=== Group of the Year ===
Winner: Barenaked Ladies

Other Nominees:

- 54-40
- Blue Rodeo
- Les B.B.
- The Tragically Hip

=== Most Promising Group ===
Winner: Skydiggers

Other Nominees:

- Lost and Profound
- Pure
- Slik Toxik
- Sven Gali

=== Songwriter of the Year ===
Winner: k.d. lang and Ben Mink

Other Nominees:

- Bryan Adams
- Joan Besen
- Tom Cochrane
- Neil Young

=== Best Country Female Vocalist ===
Winner: Michelle Wright

Other Nominees:

- Lisa Brokop
- Patricia Conroy
- Susan Graham
- Sylvia Tyson

=== Best Country Male Vocalist ===
Winner: Gary Fjellgaard

Other Nominees:

- Larry Mercey
- Don Neilson
- Tom Russell
- Tim Taylor

=== Best Country Group or Duo ===
Winner: Tracey Prescott & Lonesome Daddy

Other Nominees:

- Country Hearts
- Gary Fjellgaard and Linda Kidder
- Rock 'N Horse Band
- Straight Clean & Simple

=== Best Instrumental Artist ===
Winner: Ofra Harnoy

Other Nominees:

- John Arpin
- Exchange (Steve Sexton and Gerald O'Brien)
- Manteca
- Skywalk

=== International Entertainer of the Year ===
Winner: U2

Other Nominees:

- Garth Brooks
- Genesis
- Red Hot Chili Peppers
- Bruce Springsteen

=== Best Producer ===
Winner: k.d. lang and Ben Mink with co-producer Greg Penny, "Constant Craving" and "The Mind Of Love"

Other Nominees:

- Leonard Cohen with co-producer Leanne Ungar, "Closing Time" by Leonard Cohen
- Bob Rock, "Bed of Roses" by Bon Jovi
- David Tyson, "Song Instead of a Kiss" and "Tumbleweed" by Alannah Myles
- Gino and Joe Vannelli, "Living Inside Myself" and "I Just Wanna Stop" by Gino Vannelli

=== Best Recording Engineer ===
Winner: Jeff Wolpert and John Whynot, "The Lady of Shallott" and The Visit by Loreena McKennitt

Other Nominees:

- Kevin Doyle, "He Would be Sixteen" by Michelle Wright and "A Woman's Intuition" by Priscilla Wright
- Greg Penny and Marc Ramaer, k.d. lang's "Constant Craving" and "The Mind of Love"
- Phil Sheridan, Rob McConnell & The Boss Brass's "Strike Up the Band" and "Very Early"

=== Canadian Music Hall of Fame ===
Winner: Anne Murray

=== Walt Grealis Special Achievement Award ===
Winner: Brian Robertson

== Nominated and winning albums ==
=== Album of the Year ===
Winner: Ingénue, k.d. lang

Other Nominees:

- Celine Dion, Celine Dion
- Fully Completely, The Tragically Hip
- Gordon, Barenaked Ladies
- Lost Together, Blue Rodeo

=== Best Children's Album ===
Winner: Waves Of Wonder, Jack Grunsky

Other Nominees:

- Daydreams and Lullabies, Classical Kids, producer Susan Hammond
- If the Shoe Fits, Norman Foote
- Reves Multicolores, Carmen Campagne
- Something's Fishy at Camp Wiganishie, Al Simmons

=== Best Classical Album (Solo or Chamber Ensemble) ===
Winner: Beethoven: Piano Sonatas, Louis Lortie

Other Nominees:

- Brahms, Piano Music Vol. 2, Antonín Kubálek
- Lieder on Poems of Heinrich Heine, Kevin McMillian and Michael McMahon
- Schumann: Liederkreise, Catherine Robbin and Michael McMahon
- Songs of Hugo Wolf, Daniel Lichti and Arlene Shrut

=== Best Classical Album (Large Ensemble) ===
Winner: Handel: Excerpts From Floridante, Tafelmusik, with Alan Curtis, Catherine Robbin, Linda Maguire, Nancy Argenta, Ingrid Attrot, Mel Braun, leader Jeanne Lamon

Other Nominees:

- Haydn: Sumphonies Nos. 44, 51 and 52, Tafelmusik with Bruno Wolf, leader Jeanne Lamon
- Prokofiev: Alexander Novsky and Lieutenant Kike, Montreal Symphony Orchestra, conductor Charles Dutoit
- Schumann and Chopin: Piano Concertos, Louis Lortie, the Philharmonia with Neeme Järvi
- Tchaikovsky: Swan Lake, Montreal Symphony Orchestra, conductor Charles Dutoit

=== Best Album Design ===
Winner: Rebecca Baird and Kenny Baird, Lost Together by Blue Rodeo

Other Nominees:

- Rodney Bowes, Blame it on my Youth by Holly Cole Trio
- Brian McPhee and Tammie Lynn Presnal, Restless by Skydiggers
- John W. Stewart, Bull by Bootsauce
- Hugh Syme, Dear Dear by 54-40

=== Best Selling Album (Foreign or Domestic) ===
Winner: Waking Up the Neighbours, Bryan Adams

Other Nominees:

- Achtung Baby, U2
- Mad Mad World, Tom Cochrane
- Nevermind, Nirvana
- Some Gave All, Billy Ray Cyrus

=== Best Jazz Album ===
Winner: My Ideal, P.J. Perry

Other Nominees:

- Brassy and Sassy, Rob McConnell and The Boss Brass
- Last Call at the Blue Note, Oscar Peterson Trio
- Rectangle Man, John Stetch
- Time & Tide, Mike Murley

=== Best Selling Francophone Album ===
Winner: Dion Chante Plamondon, Celine Dion

Other Nominees:

- A contre-jour, Julie Masse
- Aux portes du matin, Richard Séguin
- Quand on se donne, Francis Martin

Note: Heading West, an album by Mitsou, was also nominated, but its nomination was rescinded when Juno officials declared it had less than four-fifths of French lyrical content to qualify as a francophone album.

=== Hard Rock Album of the Year ===
Winner: Doin' the Nasty, Slik Toxik

Other Nominees:

- Angel Rat, Voivod
- Edge of Excess, Triumph
- Method to the Madness, Killer Dwarfs
- Sven Gali, Sven Gali

=== Best Roots & Traditional Album ===
Winner: Jusqu'aux p'tites heures, La Bottine Souriante

Other Nominees:

- Clawhammer Your Way to the Top, Daniel Koulack
- I Was Just Thinking That, Jackson Delta
- Moonlight Dancers, Bill Bourne and Alan MacLeod
- Where the Old Friends Meet, Ken Whiteley, Jackie Washington and Mose Scarlett

== Nominated and winning releases ==
=== Single of the Year ===
Winner: "Beauty and the Beast", Céline Dion and Peabo Bryson

Other Nominees:

- "Enid", Barenaked Ladies
- "If You Asked Me To", Celine Dion
- "Song Instead of a Kiss", Alannah Myles
- "Thought I'd Died and Gone to Heaven", Bryan Adams

=== Best Classical Composition ===
Winner: "Concerto For Flute and Orchestra", R. Murray Schafer

Other Nominees:

- "The Darkly Splendid Earth: The Lonely Traveller", R. Murray Schafer
- "Kopernikus", Claude Vivier
- "Music to St cecilia for Organ and Strings", Jean Coulthard
- "Poulenc, Thesus", R. Murray Schafer

=== Best Selling Single (Foreign or Domestic) ===
Winner: "Achy Breaky Heart", Billy Ray Cyrus

Other Nominees:

- "Black or White", Michael Jackson
- "Jump", Kris Kross
- "Justified & Ancient", The KLF
- "Please Don't Go", KWS

=== Best Rap Recording ===
Winner: "Keep It Slammin'", Devon

Other Nominees:

- "Check the O.R.", Organized Rhyme
- "The Jungle Man", The Maximum Definitive
- Maestro Zone, Maestro Fresh-Wes
- Really Livin', Ragga Muffin Rascals

=== Best R&B/Soul Recording ===
Winner: Once In A Lifetime, Love & Sas

Other Nominees:

- "Don't Look Any Further", The Nylons
- "If That was a Dream", Lorraine Scott
- "Infatuated", Vivienne Williams
- "Power to the People", Debbie Johnson

=== Best World Beat Recording ===
Winner: Spirits Of Havana, Jane Bunnett

Other Nominees:

- All Over the World, Sattalites
- Invisible Minority, Salvador Ferreras
- Listen to the World, Kaleefah
- The Prodigal Son, Show-Do-Man

=== Best Dance Recording ===
Winner: "Love Can Move Mountains (Club Mix)", Celine Dion

Other Nominees:

- "C'mon and Get My Love (House Techno Remix)", Banned in the UK
- "Don't Stop Now (Prohibition Club Mix)", Love & Sas
- "Love Vibe (Love Vibe Club Mix)", Lisa Lougheed
- "World Love (Lisa Love House Mix)", Lisa Lougheed

=== Best Video ===
Winner: Curtis Wehrfritz, "Closing Time" by Leonard Cohen

Other Nominees:

- Lyne Charlebois, "Bohemia" by Mae Moore
- Peter Henderson, "Locked in the Trunk of a Car" by The Tragically Hip
- Curtis Wehrfritz, "No Regrets" by Tom Cochrane
- Curtis Wehrfritz, "She La" by 54-40
