= Juno Awards of 1986 =

Canadian music awards ceremony

- Date: 10 November 1986
- Venue: Harbour Castle Hilton Hotel, Toronto, Ontario
- Hosted by: Howie Mandel

Television/radio coverage
- Network: CBC

The Juno Awards of 1986, representing Canadian music industry achievements of the previous year, were awarded on 10 November 1986 in Toronto at a ceremony hosted by Howie Mandel at the Harbour Castle Hilton Hotel. CBC Television broadcast the ceremonies nationally. The ceremony was watched by 2 million viewers.

Labour problems at the Canadian Broadcasting Corporation overshadowed plans for the awards broadcast. NABET complained about CBC plans to hire two American technical workers to assist with a special effect during the broadcast. NABET was renegotiating a labour contract with CBC and felt that Canadians should have been hired instead.

Meanwhile, CBC workers with the CUPE stopped work on 7 November. This strike was temporary, but interrupted the work of some Juno stage hands who were members of that union. weekend. CUPE's workers returned to work on the day of the Junos broadcast, as this particular union action was not planned to continue past the weekend.

1600 public tickets were made available, but all were sold late September, approximately one month after the $170 CAD tickets were offered for sale.

Gordon Lightfoot entered Canadian Music Hall of Fame, and was introduced at the ceremonies by Bob Dylan who made a surprise appearance.

== Nominees and winners ==
=== Female Vocalist of the Year ===
Winner: Luba

Other nominees:

- Carroll Baker
- Anne Murray
- Martine St. Clair
- Jane Siberry

=== Male Vocalist of the Year ===
Winner: Bryan Adams

Other nominees:

- Bruce Cockburn
- Kim Mitchell
- Gino Vannelli
- Neil Young

=== Most Promising Female Vocalist of the Year ===
Winner: Kim Richardson

Other nominees:

- Chantal Condor
- Siobhan Crawley
- Francesca Gagnon
- Sheree Jeacocke

=== Most Promising Male Vocalist of the Year ===
Winner: Billy Newton-Davis

Other nominees:

- Doug Cameron
- Michel Lemieux
- Stan Meissner
- Scott Merritt

=== Group of the Year ===
Winner: Honeymoon Suite

Other nominees:

- Loverboy
- Platinum Blonde
- Rush
- Triumph

=== Most Promising Group of the Year ===
Winner: Glass Tiger

Other nominees:

- Cats Can Fly
- Chalk Circle
- Eye Eye
- One to One

=== Composer of the Year ===
Winner: Jim Vallance

Other nominees:

- Bryan Adams
- David Foster
- Corey Hart
- Luba

=== Country Female Vocalist of the Year ===
Winner: Anne Murray

Other nominees:

- Carroll Baker
- Marie Bottrell
- Kelita
- Anne Lord

=== Country Male Vocalist of the Year ===
Winner: Murray McLauchlan

Other nominees:

- Eddie Eastman
- Gilles Godard
- [[Matt Minglewood
- Frank Trainor

=== Country Group or Duo of the Year ===
Winner: Prairie Oyster

Other nominees:

- Carroll Baker and Eddie Eastman
- C-Weed Band
- The Family Brown
- The Mercey Brothers

=== Instrumental Artist of the Year ===
Winner: David Foster

Other nominees:

- Liona Boyd
- Canadian Brass
- Moe Koffman
- Zamfir

=== Producer of the Year ===
Winner: David Foster, St. Elmo's Fire Soundtrack by various artists

Other nominees:

- Terry Brown, Just in Time to Be Late by Eye Eye
- Graeme Coleman, The Bohemians by Skywalk
- Leslie Howe, Forward Your Emotions by One to One
- David Tyson, The Lines are Open by The Arrows and The Key by Erroll Starr

=== Recording Engineer of the Year ===
Winner: Joe and Gino Vannelli, Black Cars by Gino Vannelli

Other nominees:

- Patrick Glover, "The Bohemians" by Skywalk
- Leslie Howe, "Forward Your Emotions" by One to One
- Mike Jones and Paul Northfield, "Don't Forget Me" and "Thin Red Line" by Glass Tiger
- Anton Kwiatkowski, "Holst: The Planets" by Toronto Symphony Orchestra, Andrew Davis conductor

=== Canadian Music Hall of Fame ===
Winner: Gordon Lightfoot

=== Walt Grealis Special Achievement Award ===
Winner: Jack Richardson

== Nominated and winning albums ==
=== Album of the Year ===
Winner: The Thin Red Line, Glass Tiger

Other nominees:

- Alien Shores, Platinum Blonde
- Lovin' Every Minute of It, Loverboy
- Power Windows, Rush
- The Big Prize, Honeymoon Suite

=== Best Album Graphics ===
Winner: Hugh Syme and Dimo Safari, Power Windows by Rush

Other nominees:

- Heather Brown, Dean Motter, Deborah Samuel, Between the Earth & Sky by Luba
- Heather Brown, Hugh Syme, Peter Shelly, Robot Man and Friends by Peter Shelly
- Mark Gane, Martha Johnson, Dimo Safari, The World Is a Ball by M + M
- Allen Shechtman, Melosphere by Helmut Lipsky

=== Best Children's Album ===
Winner: 10 Carrot Diamond, Charlotte Diamond

Other nominees:

- A House For Me, Fred Penner
- Come on In, Eric Nagler
- Lots More Junior Jug Band, Chris Whiteley and Ken Whiteley
- Songs + Games For Toddlers, Bob McGrath and Katharine Smithrim

=== Best Classical Album of the Year - Solo or Chamber Ensemble ===
Winner: Stolen Gems, James Campbell (clarinet)

Other nominees:

- Au Verd Boys/To The Greenwood, New World Consort
- La Chanson Francaise, Songs of Medieval & Renaissance France, The Toronto Consort
- Louis Lortie Plays Maurice Ravel, Louis Lortie
- Vickers, Jon Vickers (tenor)

=== Best Classical Album of the Year - Large Ensemble or Soloist(s) With Large Ensemble Accompaniment ===
Winner: Holst: The Planets, Toronto Symphony Orchestra, Andrew Davis - Conductor]]

Other nominees:

- Franck: Symphony in D Minor & Berlioz: King Lear, Vancouver Symphony Orchestra, Kazuyoshi Akiyama conductor
- Great Verdi Arias, Edmonton Symphony Orchestra, Uri Mayer conductor, Louis Quilico baritone
- Schubert: Symphony No. 8 & Strauss: Metamorphosen, National Arts Centre Orchestra, Franco Mannino conductor
- Suppe: Overtures, Montreal Symphony Orchestra, Charles Dutoit conductor

=== International Album of the Year ===
Winner: Brothers in Arms, Dire Straits

Other nominees:

- Afterburner, ZZ Top
- Heart, Heart
- Miami Vice soundtrack, various artists
- Scarecrow, John (Cougar) Mellencamp

=== Best Jazz Album ===
Winner: Lights of Burgundy, Oliver Jones

Other nominees:

- Atras De Porta, Rob McConnell and the Boss Brass
- Boss Brass & Woods, Rob McConnell and the Boss Brass featuring Phil Woods
- Doomsday Machine, Denny Christianson Big Band
- The Rob McConnell Sextet Old Friends/New Music, The Rob McConnell Sextet

== Nominated and winning releases ==
=== Best Selling Single ===
Winner: "Don't Forget Me (When I'm Gone)", Glass Tiger

Other nominees:

- "Crying Over You", Platinum Blonde
- "Diana", Bryan Adams
- "Everything in My Heart", Corey Hart
- "L'Amour est dans tes yeux", Martine St. Clair

=== International Single of the Year ===
Winner: "Live Is Life", Opus

Other nominees:

- "Cherish", Kool & the Gang
- "Nikita", Elton John
- "Rock Me Amadeus", Falco
- "Say You, Say Me", Lionel Richie

=== Best R&B/Soul Recording of the Year ===
Winner: "Love is a Contact Sport", Billy Newton-Davis

Other nominees:

- "All in the Way", Liberty Silver
- "I Found a Love", Glen Ricketts
- "The Key", Erroll Starr
- "Right Here Is Where You Belong", Kenny Hamilton

=== Best Reggae/Calypso Recording ===
Winner: Revolutionary Tea Party, Lillian Allen

Other nominees:

- Free South Africa, Jayson
- Moonlight Lover, Ras Lee
- Night Rider, Messenjah
- No One Can Love Me Like You Do, George Banton

=== Best Video ===
Winner: Greg Masuak, "How Many (Rivers To Cross)" by Luba

Other nominees:

- Rob Quartly, "Cosmetics" by Gowan
- Rob Quartly, "Don't Forget Me (When I'm Gone)" by Glass Tiger
- Rob Quartly, "Harmony" by Ian Thomas
- Lorraine Segato, "Sexual Intelligence" by The Parachute Club
