= Juno Awards of 1987 =

Canadian music awards ceremony

- Date: 2 November 1987
- Venue: O'Keefe Centre, Toronto, Ontario
- Hosted by: Howie Mandel

Television/radio coverage
- Network: CBC

The Juno Awards of 1987, representing Canadian music industry achievements of the previous year, were awarded on 2 November 1987 in Toronto at a ceremony in the O'Keefe Centre. Howie Mandel was the host for the ceremonies, which were broadcast on CBC Television.

This was the last year the Juno presentations were held in the latter part of the calendar year. CARAS, which was responsible for the awards, chose to revert to an early-year scheduling, therefore no Junos were awarded 1988 but were rescheduled to March 1989.

== Nominees and winners ==
=== Canadian Entertainer of the Year ===
Winner: Bryan Adams

Other Nominees:

- Tom Cochrane & Red Rider
- Bruce Cockburn
- Glass Tiger
- Gowan
- Corey Hart
- k.d. lang
- Anne Murray
- Rock & Hyde
- The Nylons

=== Female Vocalist of the Year ===
Winner: Luba (Capitol)

Other Nominees:

- Lee Aaron (Attic)
- Véronique Béliveau (A&M)
- k.d. lang (WEA)
- Anne Murray (Capitol)

=== Male Vocalist of the Year ===
Winner: Bryan Adams (A&M)

Other Nominees:

- Corey Hart (Aquarius)
- Gowan (CBS)
- Kim Mitchell (Alert)
- Gino Vannelli (PolyGram)

=== Most Promising Female Vocalist of the Year ===
Winner: Rita MacNeil

Other Nominees:

- Heather Bishop (Mother of Pearl)
- Celine Dion (CBS)
- Debbie Johnson
- Nancy Martinez (WEA)

=== Most Promising Male Vocalist of the Year ===
Winner: Tim Feehan

Other Nominees:

- David Gibson (A&M)
- Mark Korven (Duke Street)
- Daniel Lavoie (Capitol)
- Christopher Ward (Attic)

=== Group of the Year ===
Winner: Tom Cochrane & Red Rider (Capitol)

Other Nominees:

- The Box (Alert)
- The Parachute Club (Current/BMG)
- Rock & Hyde (Capitol)
- Triumph (MCA)

=== Most Promising Group of the Year ===
Winner: Frozen Ghost

Other Nominees:

- Eight Seconds (PolyGram)
- Haywire (Attic)
- Nuance (ISBA)
- The Partland Brothers (Capitol)

=== Composer of the Year ===
Winner: Jim Vallance

Other Nominees:

- Bryan Adams
- Tom Cochrane
- David Foster
- Bob Rock & Paul Hyde
- Eddie Schwartz

=== Country Female Vocalist of the Year ===
Winner: k.d. lang (WEA)

Other Nominees:

- Carroll Baker (Tembo)
- Kelita (BMG)
- Anne Murray (Capitol)
- Sylvia Tyson (Stony Plain)

=== Country Male Vocalist of the Year ===
Winner: Ian Tyson (Stony Plain)

Other Nominees:

- Terry Carisse (Savannah)
- Terry Christenson (BMG)
- Gary Fjellgaard (Savannah)
- Ronnie Prophet (BMG)

=== Country Group or Duo of the Year ===
Winner: Prairie Oyster (Stony Plain)

Other Nominees:

- Double Eagle (Book Shop Records)
- The Good Brothers (Savannah)
- Anita Perras & Tim Taylor (Savannah)
- Stoker Brothers (BMG)

=== Instrumental Artist of the Year ===
Winner: David Foster (WEA)

Other Nominees:

- Liona Boyd (CBS)
- Canadian Brass (CBS)
- Hagood Hardy (Duke Street)
- Frank Mills (Capitol)

=== Producer of the Year ===
Winner: Daniel Lanois, So – Peter Gabriel (WEA)

Other Nominees:

- Bryan Adams (Co-producer Bob Clearmountain), "Heat of the Night" – Bryan Adams (A&M)
- Terry Brown (Co-producer Cutting Crew), Broadcast – Cutting Crew (Virgin)
- Bruce Fairbairn, "You Give Love a Bad Name" – Bon Jovi & "Livin' on a Prayer" – Bon Jovi (PolyGram)
- Daniel Lanois (Co-producer Brian Eno), The Joshua Tree – U2 (Island)
- Gino Vannelli / Joe Vannelli / Ross Vannelli, Big Dreamers Never Sleep – Gino Vannelli (PolyGram)
- Chris Wardman, Mending Wall – Chalk Circle (Duke St.)

=== Recording Engineer of the Year ===
Winner: Gino Vannelli and Joe Vannelli, "Wild Horses" & "Young Lover" by Gino Vannelli

Other Nominees:

- Peter Lee, "Soul on Ice" & "Heart of Darkness" from No Heroes by Manteca
- John Naslen, "Purple Haze" & "How the Violin" from Shaking the Pumpkin by Hugh Marsh and "Waiting for a Miracle" & "Stolen Land" from Waiting for a Miracle: Singles 1970–1987 by Bruce Cockburn
- Bob Rock, "Wanted Dead or Alive" & "Livin' on a Prayer" from Slippery When Wet by Bon Jovi
- Phil Sheridan, "Ellington" from Mel Tormé / Rob McConnell & The Boss Brass by Rob McConnell & The Boss Brass

=== Canadian Music Hall of Fame ===
Winner: The Guess Who

=== Walt Grealis Special Achievement Award ===
Winner: Bruce Allen

== Nominated and winning albums ==
=== Album of the Year ===
Winner: Shakin' Like a Human Being – Kim Mitchell (Alert)

Other Nominees:

- Between the Earth & Sky – Luba (Capitol)
- Fields of Fire – Corey Hart (Aquarius)
- Great Dirty World – Gowan (CBS)
- Into the Fire – Bryan Adams (A&M)

=== Best Album Graphics ===
Winner: Jamie Bennett and Shari Spier, Small Victories by The Parachute Club

Other Nominees:

- Erika Gagnon, Fields of Fire by Corey Hart
- Dale Heslip and Deborah Samuel, Frozen Ghost by Frozen Ghost
- Dale Heslip and Deborah Samuel, Mending Wall by Chalk Circle
- Bart Schoales, Waiting for a Miracle: Singles 1970–1987 by Bruce Cockburn

=== Best Jazz Album ===
Winner: If You Could See Me Now – The Oscar Peterson Four (A&M)

Other Nominees:

- Cafe Alto – Dave Turner (CBC Ent.)
- Speak Low, Swing Hard – Oliver Jones Trio (Justin Time)
- Streetniks – The Shuffle Demons (Stubby)
- Trio Jon Ballantyne – Jon Ballantyne (CBC Ent.)

=== Best Classical Album of the Year ===
Winner: Schubert, Quintet in C – The Orford String Quartet, Ofra Harnoy (cello) (Fanfare)

Other Nominees:

- Avison/Scarlatti, Concerti Grossi – Tafelmusik Baroque Orchestra (CBC Ent.)
- Great Russian Piano Music – Anton Kuerti (piano) (Fanfare)
- Impact – Beverley Johnston (percussion), James Campbell (clarinet) (Centre-discs)
- Presenting Joaquin Valdepenas – Joaquin Valdepenas (clarinet), Patricia Parr (piano) (CBC Ent.)

=== Best Classical Album of the Year – Large Ensemble or Soloist(s) With Large Ensemble Accompaniment ===
Winner: Holst: The Planets – Montreal Symphony Orchestra, Charles Dutoit (conductor) (PolyGram)

Other Nominees:

- Beethoven, Piano Concertos – Toronto Symphony, Anton Kuerti (piano) (CBC Ent.)
- Berlioz: Romeo et Juliette – Montreal Symphony Orchestra, Charles Dutoit (conductor) (PolyGram)
- Stravinsky, The Firebird – Montreal Symphony Orchestra, Charles Dutoit (conductor) (PolyGram)
- Tchaikovsky: 1812 Overture, Capriccio Italien, March Slave, Nutcracker Suite – Montreal Symphony Orchestra, Charles Dutoit, (conductor) (PolyGram)

=== Best Children's Album ===
Winner: Drums! – Bill Usher (Kids')

Other Nominees:

- Bananas in His Eyebrows – Roberta Lynne Stones (Banana)
- Diamond in the Rough – Charlotte Diamond (Hug Bug)
- Family Album – Rick & Judy (Mariposa)
- Family Pie – Kim & Jerry Brodey (Kids')

=== International Album of the Year ===
Winner: True Blue – Madonna

Other Nominees:

- Revenge – Eurythmics
- Slippery When Wet – Bon Jovi
- The Joshua Tree – U2
- Top Gun Soundtrack – Various artists

== Nominated and winning releases ==
=== Single of the year ===
Winner: "Someday" – Glass Tiger (Capitol)

Other Nominees:

- "Can't Help Falling in Love" – Corey Hart (Aquarius)
- "Heat of the Night" – Bryan Adams (A&M)
- "Patio Lanterns" – Kim Mitchell (Alert)
- "Vivre dans la nuit" – Nuance (ISBA)

=== International Single of the Year ===
Winner: "Venus" – Bananarama

Other Nominees:

- "Papa Don't Preach" by Madonna
- "Rumors" by Timex Social Club
- "The Lady in Red" by Chris de Burgh
- "Touch Me (I Want Your Body)" by Samantha Fox

=== Best Classical Composition ===
Winners:

- Atayoskewin – Malcolm Forsyth (composer), Edmonton Symphony Orchestra, Uri Mayer (conductor), (CBC Ent.)
- Pages of Solitary Delights – Donald Steven (composer), Maureen Forrester with the McGill Symphony Orchestra, Richard Hoenich (conductor), (McGill University Records)

Other Nominees:

- Cadenzas – Impact, Alexina Louie (composer) (Centrediscs)
- Overture to a Fairy Tale – Canadian & Russian Overtures, Oskar Morawetz (composer) (CBC Ent.)
- Scherzo For String Orchestra – Entre Amis, Andre Prevost (composer) (CBC Ent.)

=== Best R&B/Soul Recording of the Year ===
Winner: Peek-A-Boo – Kim Richardson (A&M)

Other Nominees:

- Big City – Glen Ricketts (Seraff)
- Dream Girl – George Olliver (Slott)
- For The Love of Money – Erroll Starr (A&M)
- Here And Now – Tchukon (Aquarius)

=== Best Reggae/Calypso Recording ===
Winner: Mean While – Leroy Sibbles (Attic)

Other Nominees:

- Chant, Chant – Errol Blackwood (Jahmaker)
- Crazy – Messenjah (Version)
- Empty Promises – Adrian Miller (Bridge)
- Live Via Sattalites – Sattalites (Axe)

=== Best Video ===
Winner: Ron Berti, "Love Is Fire" – The Parachute Club (Current/BMG)

Other Nominees:

- Ron Berti, "Waiting for a Miracle" – Bruce Cockburn (True North)
- Mark Gane & Martha Johnson, "Only You" – M+M (Current/BMG)
- Nelu Ghiran, "I'm an Adult Now" – The Pursuit of Happiness (Swell)
- Stephen Surjik, "Should I See" – Frozen Ghost (WEA)
- Rob Quartly, "Easy to Tame" – Kim Mitchell (Alert)
