= Juno Awards of 1990 =

Canadian music awards ceremony

- Date: 18 March 1990
- Venue: O'Keefe Centre, Toronto, Ontario
- Hosted by: Rick Moranis

Television/radio coverage
- Network: CBC

The Juno Awards of 1990, representing Canadian music industry achievements of the previous year, were awarded on 18 March 1990 in Toronto at a ceremony in the O'Keefe Centre. Rick Moranis was the host for the ceremonies, which were broadcast on CBC Television.

Singer-songwriter Alannah Myles won in three Juno categories on the strength of her internationally successful debut album.

Specialty television service YTV would broadcast a repeat of the televised awards ceremony one week later, according to a five-year agreement announced before the 1990 Juno Awards.

== Nominees and winners ==
=== Canadian Entertainer of the Year ===
This award was chosen by a national poll rather than by Juno organisers CARAS.

Winner: The Jeff Healey Band

Other Nominees:

- Blue Rodeo
- Tom Cochrane
- k.d. lang
- Kim Mitchell

=== Best Female Vocalist ===
Winner: Rita MacNeil

Other Nominees:

- Lee Aaron
- Sass Jordan
- Anne Murray
- Candy Pennella

=== Best Male Vocalist ===
Winner: Kim Mitchell

Other Nominees:

- Bruce Cockburn
- George Fox
- David Wilcox
- Neil Young

=== Most Promising Female Vocalist ===
Winner: Alannah Myles

Other Nominees:

- Annette Ducharme
- Mitsou
- Mary Margaret O'Hara
- Anita Perras

=== Most Promising Male Vocalist ===
Winner: Daniel Lanois

Other Nominees:

- Neil Harnett
- Ray Lyell
- Roch Voisine
- Rufus Wainwright

=== Group of the Year ===
Winner: Blue Rodeo

Other Nominees:

- Tom Cochrane and Red Rider
- Cowboy Junkies
- The Jeff Healey Band
- Rush

=== Most Promising Group ===
Winner: The Tragically Hip

Other Nominees:

- Brighton Rock
- Indio
- Paradox
- Sons of Freedom

=== Best Composer ===
Winner: David Tyson and Christopher Ward (for Alannah Myles)

Other Nominees:

- Greg Keelor and Jim Cuddy
- Luba
- Eddie Schwartz
- Jim Vallance

=== Best Country Female Vocalist ===
Winner: k.d. lang

Other Nominees:

- Carroll Baker
- Rita MacNeil
- Anne Murray
- Lori Yates

=== Best Country Male Vocalist ===
Winner: George Fox

Other Nominees:

- Gary Fjellgaard
- Handsome Ned
- Ian Tyson
- Jesse Winchester

=== Best Country Group or Duo ===
Winner: The Family Brown

Other Nominees:

- Alibi
- Great Western Orchestra
- Silver and Degazio
- Stoker Brothers

=== Best Instrumental Artist ===
Winner: Manteca

Other Nominees:

- Liona Boyd
- Canadian Brass
- Frank Mills
- Tafelmusik Baroque Chamber Orchestra

=== International Entertainer of the Year ===
Winner: Melissa Etheridge

Other Nominees:

- Crowded House
- Steve Earle
- Rod Stewart
- Randy Travis

=== Best Producer ===
Winner: Bruce Fairbairn, Pump by Aerosmith

Other Nominees:

- Daniel Lanois, Acadie by Daniel Lanois
- Bob Rock, Dr. Feelgood by Mötley Crüe & Blue Murder by Blue Murder
- Neil Peart, Geddy Lee and Alex Lifeson (with Co-producer Rupert Hine), "Force Ten" from Hold Your Fire & "Presto" from Presto by Rush
- David Tyson, Alannah Myles by Alannah Myles

=== Best Recording Engineer ===
Winner: Kevin Doyle, Alannah Myles by Alannah Myles

Other Nominees:

- Jean Claude Beaudoin, Tell Somebody by Sass Jordan
- Lenny DeRose, Bodyrock by Lee Aaron & she by Dalbello
- John Naslen, Big Circumstance by Bruce Cockburn
- Rick Starks, Perfect Foot by Manteca
- Michael Phillip Wojewoda, As the Crow Flies by Chalk Circle

=== Hall of Fame Award ===
Winner: Maureen Forrester

=== Walt Grealis Special Achievement Award ===
Winner: Rush

== Nominated and winning albums ==
=== Album of the Year ===
Winner: Alannah Myles, Alannah Myles

Other Nominees:

- Now the Bells Ring, Rita MacNeil
- Rita, Rita MacNeil
- See the Light, The Jeff Healey Band
- Victory Day, Tom Cochrane and Red Rider

=== Best Children's Album ===
Winner: Beethoven Lives Upstairs, Susan Hammond and Barbara Nichol

Other Nominees:

- The Boy Who Wanted to Talk to Whales, Robert Minden Ensemble
- Footeprints, Norman Foote
- Improvise with Eric Nagler, Eric Nagler
- The People on My Street, Bob King

=== Best Classical Album (Solo or Chamber Ensemble) ===
Winner: 20th Century Original Piano Transcriptions, Louis Lortie

Other Nominees:

- Beethoven: The Complete Quartets, The Orford String Quartet
- Corelli: Concerti Grossi, Tafelmusik Baroque Orchestra
- Gabrieli and Monteverdi: Antiphonal Music, Canadian Brass
- Kevin McMillan, baritone Kevin McMillan

=== Best Classical Album (Large Ensemble) ===
Winner: Boccherini: Cello Concertos and Symphonies, Tafelmusik Baroque Orchestra

Other Nominees:

- Fête à la Français, Montreal Symphony Orchestra, conductor Charles Dutoit
- Gershwin: Rhapsody in Blue, An American in Paris, Montreal Symphony Orchestra, conductor Charles Dutoit, piano Louis Lortie
- Haydn Symphonies No. 1 and 5, National Arts Centre Orchestra, conductor Gabriel Chmura
- Prokofiev: Symphonies Nos. 1 and 5, Montreal Symphony Orchestra, conductor Charles Dutoit

=== Best Album Design ===
Winner: Hugh Syme, Presto by Rush

Other Nominees:

- Jamie Bennett and Nuala Byles, Perfect Foot by Manteca
- Robert LeBeuf and J.W. Stewart, The Adventures of Women & Men Without Hate in the 21st Century by Men Without Hats
- Mary Margaret O'Hara, Miss America by Mary Margaret O'Hara
- Hugh Syme, Rockland by Kim Mitchell

=== International Album of the Year ===
Winner: Girl You Know It's True, Milli Vanilli (disqualified)

Other Nominees:

- Forever Your Girl, Paula Abdul
- The Raw & the Cooked, Fine Young Cannibals
- Hangin' Tough, New Kids on the Block
- Traveling Wilburys Vol. 1, Traveling Wilburys

=== Best Jazz Album ===
Winner: Skydance, Jon Ballantyne Trio featuring Joe Henderson

Other Nominees:

- Friday the 14th, Bernie Senesky
- Off Centre, Time Warp
- Pas de Probleme, The Hugh Fraser Quintet
- Something's Here, The Edmonton Jazz Ensemble

=== Best Roots & Traditional Album ===
Winner: Je Voudrais Changer D'Chapeau, La Bottine Souriante

Other Nominees:

- Humor Me, Jesse Winchester
- I Make My Home in Shoes, Amos Garrett
- Jubilation II, Montreal Jubilation Gospel Choir
- You Were on My Mind, Sylvia Tyson

== Nominated and winning releases ==
=== Single of the Year ===
Winner: "Black Velvet", Alannah Myles

Other Nominees:

- "All the Things I Wasn't", The Grapes of Wrath
- "Love Is", Alannah Myles
- "Rock n Roll Duty", Kim Mitchell
- "Under Your Spell", Candi

=== Best Classical Composition ===
Winner: Concerto For Harp and Chamber Orchestra, Oskar Morawetz

Other Nominees:

- Introduction and Three Folk Songs, Jean Coulthard
- Sonata No. 1, Pat Carrabré
- The Sons of Jacob, Sid Robinovitch
- Third Chamber Concerto, Gary Kulesha

=== International Single of the Year ===
Winner: "Swing The Mood", Jive Bunny and the Mastermixers

Other Nominees:

- "Hangin' Tough", New Kids on the Block
- "Like a Prayer", Madonna
- "She Drives Me Crazy", Fine Young Cannibals
- "Straight Up", Paula Abdul

=== Best R&B/Soul Recording ===
Winner: Spellbound, Billy Newton-Davis

Other Nominees:

- Your Love, George Banton
- Mega Love, Debbie Johnson
- Another Love in Your Life, Jay W. McGee
- Never Be Lonely, Lorraine Scott

=== Best Reggae/Calypso Recording ===
Winner: Too Late To Turn Back Now, Sattalites

Other Nominees:

- Chuckie Prophesy, Clifton Joseph
- Soca Band, Elsworth James
- South Africa is a Disgrace, Leroy Sibbles
- Tribute to Ben Johnson, Elsworth James

=== Best Dance Recording ===
Winner: "I Beg Your Pardon (I Never Promised You a Rose Garden)", Kon Kan

Other Nominees:

- "Yada Yada", Jam Jam Jam
- "Let Your Backbone Slide", Maestro Fresh-Wes
- "Missing You", Candi
- "Under Your Spell", Candi

=== Best Video ===
Winner: Cosimo Cavallaro, "Boomtown" by Andrew Cash

Other Nominees:

- Don Allan, "Watcha Do to My Body" by Lee Aaron
- Chris Hooper, Kevin Kane, Robert Longevall, "All the Things I Wasn't" by The Grapes of Wrath
- Greg Masuak, "Giving Away a Miracle" by Luba
- Kari Skogland, "Waterline" by Spoons
