= Juno Award for R&B/Soul Recording of the Year =

Canadian award for the best rhythm and blues/soul album

The Juno Award for "R&B/Soul Recording of the Year" was awarded from 1985 to 2020, as recognition each year for the best rhythm and blues/soul album in Canada. Beginning with the Juno Awards of 2021, it was split into two new categories for Contemporary R&B/Soul Recording of the Year and Traditional R&B/Soul Recording of the Year.

== Winners ==
=== Best R&B/Soul Recording (1985 - 2002) ===
Year	Winner(s)	Recording	Nominees	Ref.
1985	Liberty Silver	Lost Somewhere Inside Your Love	Demo Cates, "Memories of Moments"; Yvonne Moore, "Hit and Run Lover"; Wayne St. John, "Two Can Play"; Something Extra, "Mega Mix"	
1986	Billy Newton-Davis	Love is a Contact Sport	Kenny Hamilton, "Right Here Is Where You Belong"; Glen Ricketts, "I Found a Love"; Liberty Silver, "All in the Way"; Erroll Starr, "The Key"	
1987	Kim Richardson	Peek-A-Boo	George Olliver, Dream Girl; Glen Ricketts, Big City; Erroll Starr, For The Love of Money; Tchukon, Here and Now	
1988	No Juno Awards this year			
1989	Erroll Starr	Angel	Candi, Dancing Under a Latin Moon; Debbie Johnson and Demo Cates, Secret Love; Lorraine Scott, Crying for Love; Liberty Silver, Private Property	
1990	Billy Newton-Davis	Spellbound	George Banton, Your Love; Debbie Johnson, Mega Love; Jay W. McGee, Another Love in Your Life; Lorraine Scott, Never Be Lonely	
1991	Simply Majestic feat. B-Kool	Dance To The Music (Work Your Body)	Dance Appeal, Can't Repress the Cause; MCJ and Cool G, So Listen; Michie Mee and L.A. Luv, Jamaican Funk; Spunkadelic, Take Me Like I Am	
1992	Love & Sas	Call My Name	Debbie Johnson, Let Me Go; Lorraine Scott, All Talk; Simply Majestic, Destiny; Helen Sharpe, Got 2 Have Your Love	
1993	Love & Sas	Once in a Lifetime	Debbie Johnson, "Power to the People"; The Nylons, "Don't Look Any Further"; Lorraine Scott, "If That Was a Dream"; Vivienne Williams, "Infatuated"	
1994	Rupert Gayle	The Time Is Right (I'll Be There For You)	John James, "Mothers of Hope"; MCJ and Cool G, "Love Me Right"; Carol Medina, "And the Song Goes"; George St. Kitts, "All I Need"	
1995	Bass Is Base	First Impression for the Bottom Jigglers	The Earthtones, "Key to My Heart"; Gentlemen X, "Smooth & Soft"; Carol Medina, "I Had a Dream"; The Nylons, "Love T.K.O."	
1996	Deborah Cox	Deborah Cox	Bass is Base, Memories of the SoulShack Survivors; jacksoul, Absolute; The Philosopher Kings, The Philosopher Kings; Charlene Smith, Feel the Good Times	
1997	Carlos Morgan	Feelin' Alright	The Earthtones, Blindfolded and Ready; Gavin Hope, Can I Get Close; The McAuley Boys, In Another Lifetime; George St. Kitts, Never Stop	
1998	Deborah Cox	"Things Just Ain't the Same"	Camille Douglas, "Don't Leave Me Hangin"; Glenn Lewis, "The Thing to Do"; The Philosopher Kings, Famous, Rich and Beautiful; Unique, "How May I Do You"	
1999	Deborah Cox	One Wish	Jully Black feat. Saukrates, Rally'n; Kirsten Farkollie, I Need Some Time; Glenn Lewis, Bout Your Love; Tamia, Tamia	
2000	2Rude feat. Snow, Smooth tha Hustler, Latoya and Miranda	Thinkin' About You	Blacklisted feat. ORA, Taj and Deslisha Thomas, Tha Crab Theory; Michael Clarke, All My Love; Nodeja, Nodeja; Ivana Santilli, Brown	
2001	jacksoul	Sleepless	Baby Blue Soundcrew feat. Glenn Lewis, "Only Be In Love"; D-Cru, "I Will Be Waiting"; The Philosopher Kings, "If I Ever Lose This Heaven"; Tamia, A Nu Day	
2002	Glenn Lewis	Don't You Forget It	Baby Blue Soundcrew feat. Jully Black and Baby Cham, "The Day Before"; Chin Injeti, "Day Dreaming"; Jamie Sparks, "Unforgettable"; Sugar Jones, "Never Leave Hurt Alone"	

=== R&B/Soul Recording of the Year (2003 - Present) ===
Year	Winner(s)	Recording	Nominees	Ref.
2003	Remy Shand	The Way I Feel	Jully Black, You Changed; Shawn Desman, Get Ready; Carl Henry, RNB; Glenn Lewis, World Outside My Window	
2004	In Essence	The Master Plan	Big Black Lincoln, Pimpin' Life; Glenn Lewis feat. Kardinal Offishall, Back for More; Tamia, Officially Missing You; X-Quisite, X-Quisite	
2005	Keshia Chanté	Keshia Chanté	Gary Beals, Gary Beals; jacksoul, Resurrected; Ray Robinson, What It Is; Tamia, More	
2006	Shawn Desman	Back for More	Jully Black, This Is Me; Divine Brown, Divine Brown; Cory Lee, "The Naughty Song"; Massari, Massari	
2007	jacksoul	mySOUL	Deesha, "Life Less Ordinary"; George, "Believe"; Karl Wolf, "Face Behind The Face"; Keshia Chanté, "Been Gone"	
2008	Jully Black	Revival	Corneille, The Birth of Cornelius; Ebrahim, Goldrush; Keshia Chanté, 2U; God Made Me Funky, We Can All Be Free	
2009	Divine Brown	The Love Chronicles	Deborah Cox, The Promise; Elise Estrada, Elise Estrada; Zaki Ibrahim, Money; Ivana Santilli, TONY	
2010	jacksoul	"Lonesome Highway"	Jully Black, The Black Book; Jarvis Church, The Long Way Home; Danny Fernandes, Intro; Melanie Fiona, The Bridge	
2011	Quanteisha	"Stars"	Keshia Chanté, "Test Drive"; Raghav feat. Kardinal Offishall, "So Much", Solitair feat. Kardinal Offishall, "Come True"; Karl Wolf, Nightlife	
2012	Melanie Fiona	"Gone and Never Coming Back"	Jully Black feat. Kardinal Offishall, "Set it Off"; JRDN, IAMJRDN; Robin Thicke feat. Lil Wayne, "Pretty Lil' Heart"; Karl Wolf feat. Kardinal Offishall, "Ghetto Love"	
2013	The Weeknd	Trilogy	Jully Black, "Fugitive"; Shawn Desman, "Nobody Does It Like You"; Melanie Fiona, "Change the Record"; Kreesha Turner, Tropic Electric	
2014	JRDN featuring Kardinal Offishall	"Can't Choose"	Joanna Borromeo, "Kaleidoscope"; Kim Davis, "There's Only One"; Melanie Durrant, "Gone"; The Weeknd, "Kiss Land"	
2015	The Weeknd	"Often"	Melanie Durrant, "Four Seasons"; jacksoul, "Got to Have It"; JRDN, JRDN; Ben Stevenson, Dirty Laundry	
2016	The Weeknd	Beauty Behind the Madness	Alessia Cara, Four Pink Walls; Dru, "Déjà Vu"; Patrick Lehman, Butchy's Son; August Rigo, The Fall Out	
2017	The Weeknd	Starboy	Daniel Caesar, Pilgrim's Paradise; Tanika Charles, Soul Run; dvsn, Sept. 5; PARTYNEXTDOOR, PARTYNEXTDOOR 3	
2018	Daniel Caesar	Freudian	Jahkoy, Foreign Water; Jessie Reyez, Kiddo; Jhyve, Human; Keshia Chanté, Unbound 01	
2019	Jessie Reyez	Being Human in Public	Anders, Twos; Black Atlass, Pain & Pleasure; Charlotte Day Wilson, Stone Woman; The Weeknd, My Dear Melancholy,	
2020	Jessie Reyez, Tory Lanez and Tainy	"Feel It Too"	Amaal, "Black Dove"; Daniel Caesar, "Case Study 01"; Tanika Charles, "The Gumption"; Tory Lanez, Chixtape 5	
