= Tchukon =

Canadian band

- Origin: Montreal, Quebec, Canada
- Genres: Funk, R&B
- Years active: 1978–1990
- Label: Aquarius Records
- Past members: Warren "Slim" Williams; Kat Dyson; Harold Fisher; Ingrid Stitt; Eric Roberts

Tchukon was a Canadian funk and R&B band, active from 1978 to 1990. Best known for winning CBC Television's 1985 music competition Rock Wars and being named Best Vocal Group in the 1986 edition of Star Search, the band ultimately released just one Juno Award-nominated album before dissolving.

== Background ==
The band consisted of singer and keyboardist Warren "Slim" Williams, singer and guitarist Kat Dyson, bassist Harold Fisher, saxophonist Ingrid Stitt and drummer Eric Roberts, and was formed in 1978 after Williams, Dyson and Roberts all moved to Montreal, Quebec, from their original home in Norfolk, Virginia. In Montreal, they added Fisher, also an American immigrant, and Stitt, the band's only Canadian-born member. The band took its name from a Russian language word for the point at which the physical world and the cosmic world merge.

In their early years, the band regularly performed both in Montreal and on tour, recorded the single "Plastic People" b/w "Love's Gonna Get You", and recorded and performed as a backing band for acts such as Louise Portal, Michel Pagliaro, Boule Noire, Freddie James, and Véronique Béliveau. Dyson was also simultaneously a performer with the Montreal Jubilation Gospel Choir.

== Rock Wars and Star Search ==
In 1985, they competed on Rock Wars, winning the competition over finalists Eye Eye, HB Concept and Peter Mann and the Lonely. Their prize included CA$100,000 and a half-hour CBC Television special, which they then submitted as their demo for the 1986 Star Search. They were named Best Vocal Group in the latter competition, winning a prize of US$100,000. They were the first Canadian-based act ever to win a Star Search category.

Their Star Search win sparked interest from record labels, and the band ultimately signed with Aquarius Records.

The band garnered a Félix Award nomination as Anglophone Artist of the Year at the 1986 awards.

During this era, the band was managed for several years by athlete and broadcaster Sylvia Sweeney.

== Album ==
They used their prize money from Rock Wars and Star Search to begin the process of writing and recording their first album. The resulting album, Here and Now, recorded at Le Studio in Morin-Heights, was released in June 1987, and garnered a Juno Award nomination for Best R&B/Soul Album at the Juno Awards of 1987.

== Breakup ==
The band had begun recording songs for its second album when the project was put on a brief hiatus so that several members, including Dyson, could perform in Donald K. Tarlton's production of Dream of a Lifetime, a musical about the life of Marvin Gaye. This, and the various other projects in which the band members were involved, significantly impacted the band's creative momentum; while they never officially announced a breakup, the second album was never completed or released.

Williams went on to produce an album for Louise Robey, recorded the solo album Pony and took an acting role in André Forcier's film An Imaginary Tale (Une histoire inventée). In 1993, he won a Gemini Award for his work composing the score for Sweeney's television documentary film In the Key of Oscar.

Dyson went on to success as a session musician, joining Prince's band The New Power Generation before going on to perform and tour with Donny and Marie, Cyndi Lauper, Pink, Seal, George Clinton, Phoebe Snow, and Big Mama Thornton.

Stitt went on to become a music teacher at Burnaby North Secondary in Burnaby, British Columbia.

The band reunited for a one-off concert performance in Montreal in 2013.
