= Juno Awards of 1985 =

Canadian music awards ceremony

- Date: 4 November 1985
- Venue: Harbour Castle Hilton Hotel, Toronto, Ontario
- Hosted by: Andrea Martin, Martin Short

Television/radio coverage
- Network: CBC

The Juno Awards of 1985, representing Canadian music industry achievements of the previous year, were awarded on 4 November 1985 in Toronto. The ceremony was hosted by Andrea Martin and Martin Short at the Harbour Castle Hilton Hotel.

New categories for R&B/Soul and Reggae/Calypso were introduced this year. Nominations in secondary categories (children's, video, producer, recording engineer, classical and jazz) were announced 27 September 1985.

The ceremonies were broadcast nationally on CBC Television from 7pm Eastern Time. These included performances by Liberty Silver, Kim Mitchell and a duet of Tina Turner and Bryan Adams. Prime Minister Brian Mulroney was also in attendance.

Earlier in 1985, most major Canadian music artists joined each other to create the benefit single "Tears Are Not Enough". It was not represented among the year's Juno nominations although it demonstrated strength in the Canadian music industry.

This marked the first year that a black female was awarded a Juno: Liberty Silver.

== Nominees and winners ==
=== Female Vocalist of the Year ===
Winner: Luba

Other nominees:

- Lee Aaron
- Dalbello
- Anne Murray
- Carole Pope

=== Male Vocalist of the Year ===
Winner: Bryan Adams

Other nominees:

- Bruce Cockburn
- Gowan
- Corey Hart
- Kim Mitchell

=== Most Promising Female Vocalist of the Year ===
Winner: k.d. lang

Other nominees:

- Connie Kaldor
- Belinda Metz
- Liberty Silver
- Vanity

=== Most Promising Male Vocalist of the Year ===
Award presented by: Kim Mitchell and Véronique Béliveau

Winner: Paul Janz

Other nominees:

- Claude Dubois
- Daniel Lavoie
- Johnnie Lovesin
- Johnny MacLeod

=== Group of the Year ===
Winner: The Parachute Club

Other nominees:

- Helix
- Honeymoon Suite
- Strange Advance
- Triumph

=== Most Promising Group of the Year ===
Winner: Idle Eyes

Other nominees:

- The Arrows
- The Box
- Images in Vogue
- Rational Youth

=== Composer of the Year ===
Winner: Bryan Adams and Jim Vallance

Other nominees:

- David Foster
- Corey Hart
- Luba
- Eddie Schwartz

=== Country Female Vocalist of the Year ===
Winner: Anne Murray

Other nominees:

- Carroll Baker
- Marie Bottrell
- Anne Lord
- Laura Vinson

=== Country Male Vocalist of the Year ===
Winner: Murray McLauchlan

Other nominees:

- Terry Carisse
- Ronnie Hawkins
- Terry Sumsion
- Valdy

=== Country Group or Duo of the Year ===
Winner: The Family Brown

Other nominees:

- C-Weed Band
- Kelita Haverland and Gilles Godard
- Midnite Rodeo Band
- Anita Perras and Tim Taylor

=== Instrumental Artist of the Year ===
Winner: Canadian Brass

Other nominees:

- Hagood Hardy
- Frank Mills
- The Spitfire Band
- Zamfir

=== Producer of the Year ===
Winner: David Foster, Chicago 17 by Chicago

Other nominees:

- Bryan Adams, Reckless by Bryan Adams
- Terry Brown, New Regime by New Regime
- Peter Cardinali, The Bear Walks by Hugh Marsh
- Declan O'Doherty, Idle Eyes by Idle Eyes
- Gino Vannelli, Black Cars by Gino Vannelli

=== Recording Engineer of the Year ===
Winner: Hayward Parrott, Underworld by The Front

Other nominees:

- Kevin Doyle, Claim to Fame by Robert Armes
- Kevin Doyle, Smalltown Girl by Target
- Gary Gray, The Bear Walks by Hugh Marsh
- Anton Kwiatkowski, Serenade in Harmony by Elmer Iseler Singers

=== Canadian Music Hall of Fame ===
Winner: Wilf Carter

=== Walt Grealis Special Achievement Award ===
Winner: A. Hugh Joseph

== Nominated and winning albums ==
=== Album of the Year ===
Winner: Reckless, Bryan Adams

Other nominees:

- Boy in the Box, Corey Hart
- Honeymoon Suite, Honeymoon Suite
- Strange Animal, Gowan
- Walkin' the Razor's Edge, Helix

=== Best Album Graphics ===
Winner: Rob MacIntyre and Dimo Safari, Strange Animal by Gowan

Other nominees:

- Heather Brown, Secrets and Sins by Luba
- Heather Brown and Deborah Samuel, 2WO by Strange Advance
- Dean Motter, Metal for Breakfast by various artists
- James O'Mara, Idle Eyes by Idle Eyes
- Deborah Samuel, At the Feet of the Moon by The Parachute Club

=== Best Children's Album ===
Winner: Murmel Murmel Munsch, Robert Munsch

Other nominees:

- The Magic Singing Animal Farm, Brad McDonald, Frank Daller, David Waldon
- Music Builders VI, The Music Builders Chorus
- Snyder the Spider, Paul Hann
- Today's Special, Today's Special
- Wee Rockers, Wee Rockers

=== Best Classical Album of the Year - Solo or Chamber Ensemble ===
Winner: W.A. Mozart-String Quartets, The Orford String Quartet

Other nominees:

- Beethoven Violin and Piano Sonatas, Steven Staryk and John Parry
- Great French Organ Works, Mireille Lagace
- Pachelbel Cannon and Other Digital Delights, Andrew Davis and the Toronto Chamber Orchestra
- Mezzo Soprano, Catherine Robbin

=== Best Classical Album of the Year - Large Ensemble or Soloist(s) With Large Ensemble Accompaniment ===
Winner: Ravel: Ma Mere L'oye/Pavane Pour un Infante Debunte/Tombeau de Couperin And Valses Nobles et Sentimentales, l'Orchestre symphonique de Montreal, Charles Dutoit conductor

Other nominees:

- Berlioz: Symphonie Fantastique, l'Orchestre Symphonique de Montreal, Charles Dutoit conductor
- The Brandenburg Concertos, CBC Vancouver Orchestra, Mario Bernardi conductor
- Serenade in Harmony, Elmer Iseler
- Stravinsky: Le Sacre du Printemps, l'Orchestre Symphonique de Montreal, Charles Dutoit conductor

=== International Album of the Year ===
Winner: Born in the U.S.A., Bruce Springsteen

Other nominees:

- Like a Virgin, Madonna
- Make It Big, Wham!
- Private Dancer, Tina Turner
- Purple Rain, Prince

=== Best Jazz Album ===
Winner: A Beautiful Friendship, Don Thompson

Other nominees:

- Avenue B, The Bill King Quintet
- Free For Now, The Oliver Whitehead Quintet
- MacPherson, Fraser MacPherson
- The Many Moods of Oliver Jones, Oliver Jones

== Nominated and winning releases ==
=== Best Selling Single ===
Winner: "Never Surrender", Corey Hart

Other nominees:

- "A Criminal Mind", Gowan
- "Black Cars", Gino Vannelli
- "Let It Go", Luba
- "Run to You", Bryan Adams

=== International Single of the Year ===
Winner: "I Want to Know What Love Is", Foreigner

Other nominees:

- "Careless Whisper", Wham!
- "I Just Called to Say I Love You", Stevie Wonder
- "Shout", Tears for Fears
- "Wake Me Up Before You Go-Go", Wham!

=== Best R&B/Soul Recording of the Year ===
Winner: "Lost Somewhere Inside Your Love", Liberty Silver

Other nominees:

- "Hit and Run Lover", Yvonne Moore
- "Mega Mix", Something Extra
- "Memories of Moments", Demo Cates
- "Two Can Play", Wayne St. John

=== Best Reggae/Calypso Recording ===
Winner: "Heaven Must Have Sent You", Liberty Silver and Otis Gayle

Other nominees:

- Camboulay Dub, Mojah
- Trade Winds '84, Trade Winds
- Sattalites, Sattalites
- Higher Love, Syren

=== Best Video ===
Winner: Rob Quartly, "A Criminal Mind" by Gowan

Other nominees:

- Robert Bouvier, "Go For Soda" by Kim Mitchell
- Rob Quartly, "Never Surrender" by Corey Hart
- Rob Quartly, "You're a Strange Animal" by Gowan
- Deborah Samuel and Lorraine Segato, "At the Feet of the Moon" by The Parachute Club
