= Jonathan Roy =

Canadian pop singer and songwriter (born 1989)

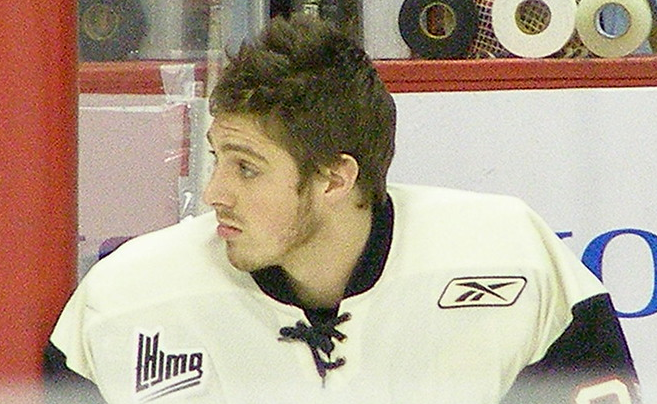
- Roy with the Quebec Remparts in 2009

Background information
- Born: March 15, 1989 (age 37); Pointe-Claire, Quebec, Canada
- Genres: Pop
- Occupation: Musician
- Years active: 2009–present
- Label: Siena
- Website: jonathanroyofficial.com

Jonathan Piuze-Roy (born March 15, 1989) is a Canadian pop singer, songwriter, and former ice hockey goaltender. He is the son of Hockey Hall of Fame goaltender Patrick Roy. Initially pursuing a hockey career in junior leagues, Roy switched paths in favour of music in 2007 after his father encouraged him away from hockey. He has released three albums, and his major-label debut, Mr. Optimist Blues, was released in 2017, which includes several songs written by 1980s pop star Corey Hart.

== Early life ==
Roy's father is famed Montreal Canadiens goaltender Patrick Roy. He moved with his family from Montreal to Colorado when he was six years old, due to his father being traded. Roy was influenced by his mother's frequent piano playing for the family as he was growing up. He wrote poetry from the age of 13 or 14, and began putting his poems to music around age 16. At age 17, Roy played hockey for the Quebec Remparts, with his father coaching the team at the time. Although he enjoyed goaltending, he dreamed of a music career, and was listening to the Backstreet Boys, John Mayer, and Ray LaMontagne. At 18, when his father told him that his future would not be in hockey and that he needed to plan an education, Roy told his father that he wanted to be a musician and songwriter. In 2009 Roy was charged with assault following an incident during a hockey brawl where he skated the length of the ice and attacked the opposing goaltender, punching him several times.

== Music career ==
Roy's album What I've Become came out in 2009. His second album, Found My Way, came out in 2010. He released his French-language debut album, La route, in 2011. The title track of a duet with Natasha St-Pier.

Roy had a role in the 2012 revival of the musical Don Juan.

In 2012, his father helped him set up a meeting with 1980s pop singer Corey Hart, who runs Siena Records, an affiliate of Warner Music. Hart offered to sign him to his label after Roy performed a Teddy Thompson song for him at Hart's home in Nassau, Bahamas. Roy and Hart released a cover of the Chris Rea song, "Driving Home for Christmas", in 2016.

In 2017, Roy released the album Mr. Optimist Blues. Hart executive-produced the album and wrote three of its songs. The Montreal Gazette's music critic characterizes the style as "easygoing 21st-century pop with a little light reggae thrown in for good measure. Think Ed Sheeran meets Paolo Nutini and then slap on Bob Marley’s greatest hits." Roy is based in Toronto.

He frequently collaborates with Kim Richardson as a duet or backing vocalist.

In 2023, he participated in an all-star recording of Serena Ryder's single, "What I Wouldn't Do", the proceeds being donated to Kids Help Phone's Feel Out Loud campaign for youth mental health.

== Discography ==
=== Albums ===
- What I've Become (2009) – No. 18 Canada
- Found My Way (2010)
- La route (2011)
- Mr. Optimist Blues (2017) – No. 3 Canada
- My Lullaby (2021) – No. 99 Canada
- Life Distortions (2023)
- Symphony of Doubts, Part 1 (2024)
