= Juno Award for International Album of the Year =

Category of Canadian music award

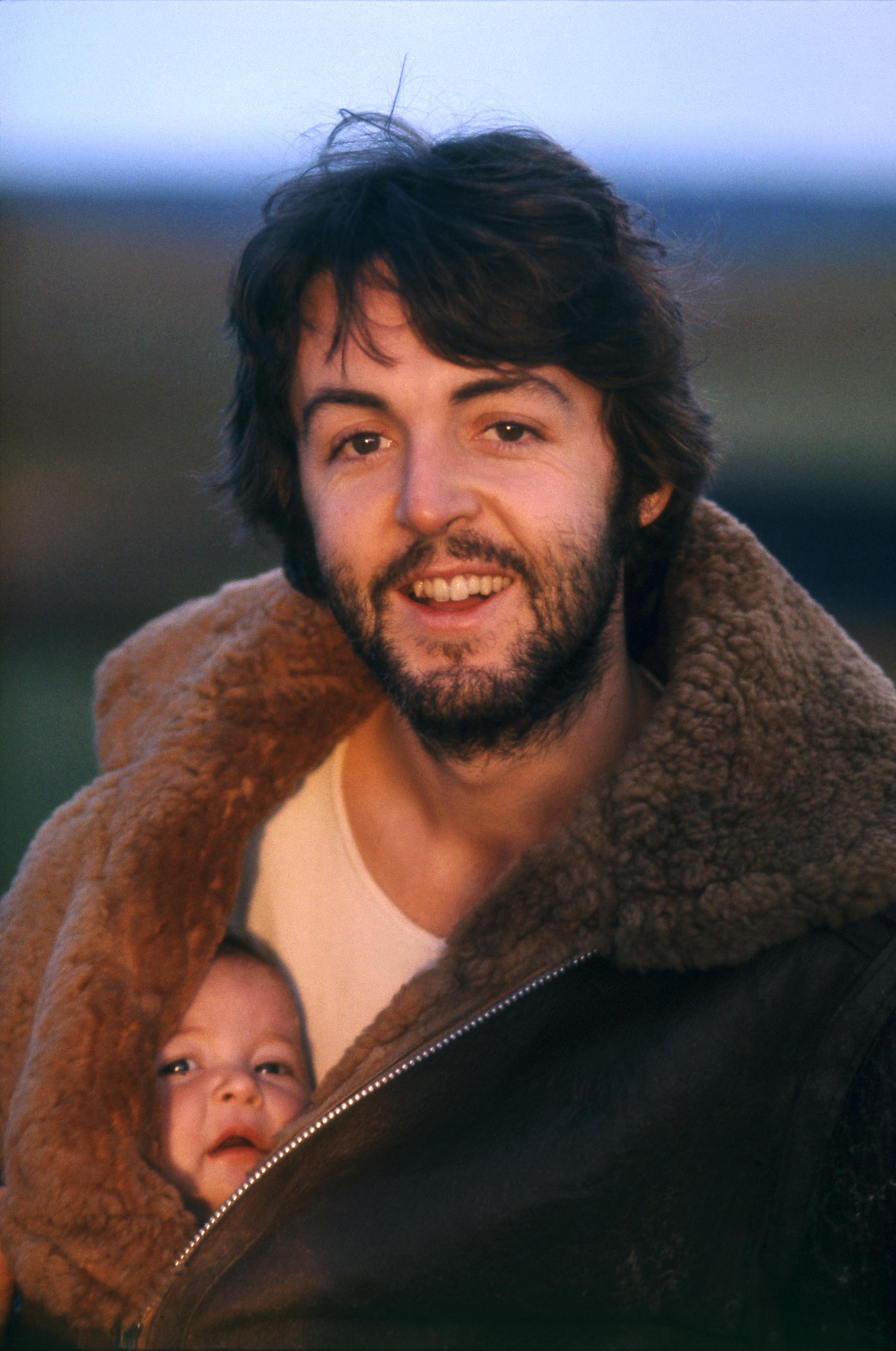
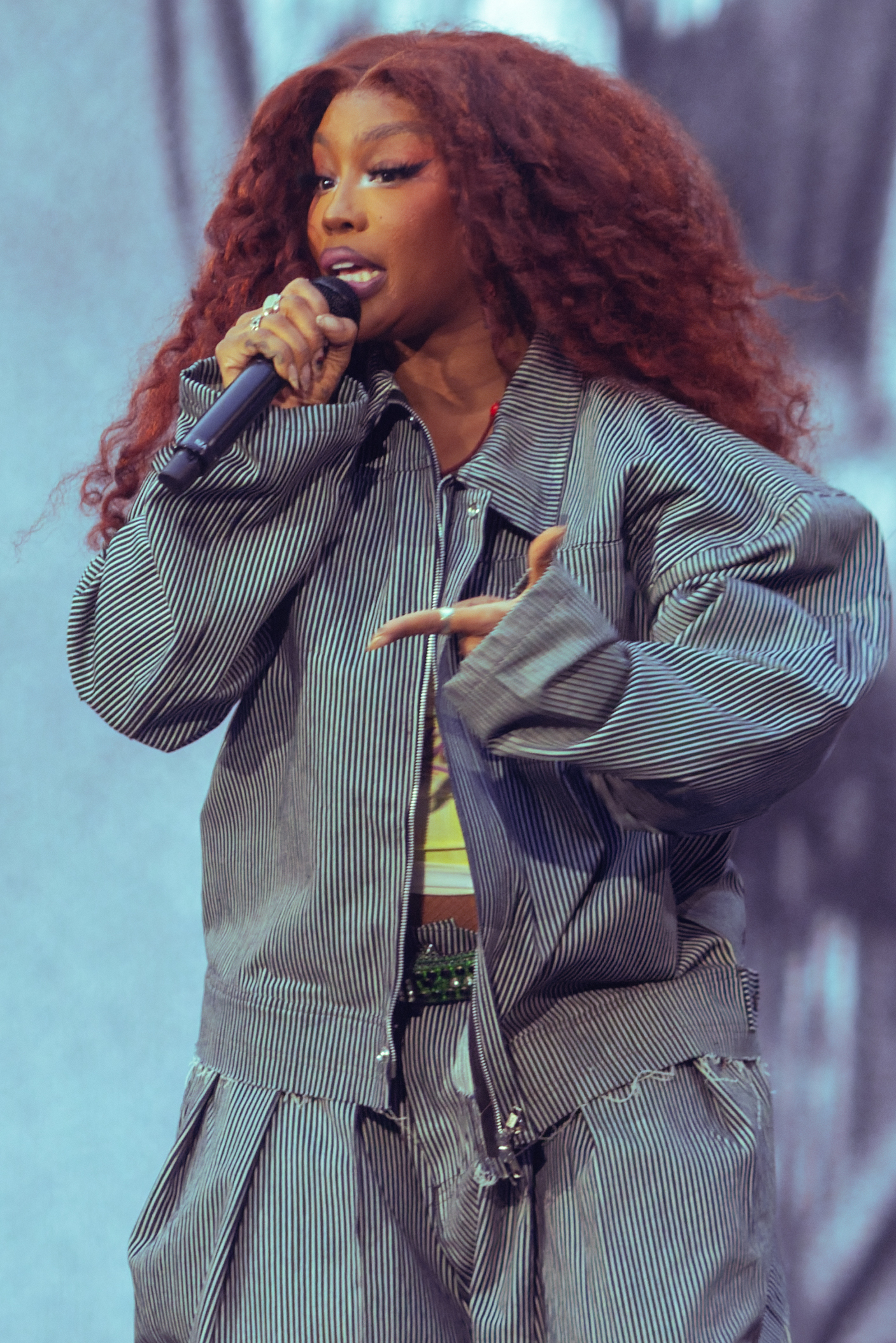
The first and so far last winners Paul McCartney (left) in 1975 and SZA (right) in 2024.

The Juno Award for International Album of the Year was an annual award given to non-Canadian albums from 1975 to 2024. It was previously known as Best Selling Album (Foreign or Domestic) (1993–2002), Best Selling Album by a Foreign Artist (1992), International Album of the Year (1981–1991) and Best Selling International Album (1975–1980). This caused the rules to change slightly over the years, allowing Canadians singers Céline Dion (1995, 1997 and 1999) and Bryan Adams (1993) to win the prize. More recently, nominees were based on sales and therefore did not necessarily represent the year's "best" international records, but ultimate winner was still determined by the CARAS board of directors.

In September 2024, the Juno Awards committee announced that several categories would be placed on hiatus. The decision led to controversy and was reverted in some fields, but the final verdict for International Album of the Year remains unclear. Coldplay is the most awarded foreign act, winning thrice. Eminem, Adele and Harry Styles follow with two victories each.

== Winners ==
=== Best Selling International Album (1975–1980) ===
- 1975 - Paul McCartney and Wings, Band on the Run
  - Various Artists, American Graffiti
  - Elton John, Goodbye Yellow Brick Road
  - John Denver, John Denver's Greatest Hits
- 1976 - Elton John, Greatest Hits
  - Paul McCartney and Wings, Venus and Mars
  - Pink Floyd Wish You Were Here
  - Cat Stevens, Greatest Hits
  - Freddy Fender, Before the Next Teardrop Falls
- 1977 - Peter Frampton, Frampton Comes Alive!
  - Charley Pride, The Best of Charley Pride Vol. 3
  - Paul McCartney and Wings, Wings over America
  - Chicago, Chicago IX: Chicago's Greatest Hits
  - Nazareth, Greatest Hits
- 1978 - Fleetwood Mac, Rumours
  - Stevie Wonder, Songs in the Key of Life
  - Boston, Boston
  - Elvis Presley, Elvis: A Collector's Edition
  - Barbra Streisand, A Star Is Born
- 1979 - Bee Gees, Saturday Night Fever
  - Rod Stewart, Foot Loose & Fancy Free
  - Various Artists, Grease
  - Meat Loaf, Bat Out of Hell
  - Fleetwood Mac, Rumours
- 1980 - Supertramp, Breakfast in America
  - Rod Stewart, Blondes Have More Fun
  - The Knack, Get the Knack
  - Boney M., Nightflight to Venus
  - Bee Gees, Spirits Having Flown

=== International Album of the Year (1981–1991) ===
- 1981 - Pink Floyd, The Wall
  - Bob Seger, Against the Wind
  - Kenny Rogers, Greatest Hits
  - Queen, The Game
- 1982 - John Lennon & Yoko Ono, Double Fantasy
  - Pat Benatar, Crimes of Passion
  - Barbra Streisand, Guilty
  - REO Speedwagon, Hi Infidelity
  - Stars on 45, Stars on Long Play
- 1983 - Men at Work, Business as Usual
  - Foreigner, 4
  - The J. Geils Band, Freeze Frame
  - Royal Philharmonic Orchestra, Hooked on Classics
  - Olivia Newton-John, Physical
- 1984 - The Police, Synchronicity
  - Lionel Richie, Can't Slow Down
  - Culture Club, Colour by Numbers
  - ZZ Top, Eliminator
  - David Bowie, Let's Dance
- 1985 - Bruce Springsteen, Born in the U.S.A.
  - Madonna, Like a Virgin
  - Wham!, Make It Big
  - Tina Turner, Private Dancer
  - Prince, Purple Rain
- 1986 - Dire Straits, Brothers in Arms
  - ZZ Top, Afterburner
  - Heart, Heart
  - Various Artists, Miami Vice
  - John Cougar Mellencamp, Scarecrow
- 1987 - Madonna, True Blue
  - Eurythmics, Revenge
  - Bon Jovi, Slippery When Wet
  - U2, The Joshua Tree
  - Various Artists, Top Gun
- 1989 - Various Artists, Dirty Dancing
  - Michael Jackson, Bad
  - Various Artists, Cocktail
  - George Michael, Faith
  - Def Leppard, Hysteria
- 1990 - Milli Vanilli, Girl You Know It's True (Disqualified)
  - Paula Abdul, Forever Your Girl
  - Fine Young Cannibals, The Raw & the Cooked
  - New Kids on the Block, Hangin' Tough
  - Traveling Wilburys, Traveling Wilburys Vol. 1
- 1991 - MC Hammer, Please Hammer, Don't Hurt 'Em
  - AC/DC, The Razors Edge
  - Phil Collins, ...But Seriously
  - New Kids on the Block, Step by Step
  - Sinéad O'Connor, I Do Not Want What I Haven't Got

=== Best Selling Album by a Foreign Artist (1992) ===
- 1992 - Vanilla Ice, To the Extreme
  - C+C Music Factory, Gonna Make You Sweat
  - Metallica, Metallica
  - Michael Bolton, Time, Love & Tenderness
  - AC/DC, The Razors Edge

=== Best Selling Album (Foreign or Domestic) (1993–2002) ===
- 1993 - Bryan Adams, Waking Up the Neighbours
  - U2, Achtung Baby
  - Tom Cochrane, Mad Mad World
  - Nirvana, Nevermind
  - Billy Ray Cyrus, Some Gave All
- 1994 - Whitney Houston, The Bodyguard
  - Meat Loaf, Bat Out of Hell II: Back into Hell
  - The Tragically Hip, Fully Completely
  - Aerosmith, Get a Grip
  - Bon Jovi, Keep the Faith
- 1995 - Celine Dion, The Colour of My Love
  - Counting Crows, August and Everything After
  - The Tragically Hip, Day For Night
  - Ace of Base, The Sign
  - Pearl Jam, Vs.
- 1996 - The Cranberries, No Need to Argue
  - Celine Dion, D'eux
  - Various Artists, Dangerous Minds
  - Eagles, Hell Freezes Over
  - Shania Twain, The Woman in Me
- 1997 - Celine Dion, Falling into You
  - The Smashing Pumpkins, Mellon Collie and the Infinite Sadness
  - Mariah Carey, Daydream
  - Fugees, The Score
  - Oasis, (What's the Story) Morning Glory?
- 1998 - Spice Girls, Spice
  - Aqua, Aquarium
  - Backstreet Boys, Backstreet Boys
  - Backstreet Boys, Backstreet's Back
  - Our Lady Peace, Clumsy
- 1999 - Celine Dion, Let's Talk About Love
  - Shania Twain, Come On Over
  - Madonna, Ray of Light
  - Spice Girls, Spiceworld
  - James Horner, Titanic
- 2000 - Backstreet Boys, Millennium
  - The Offspring, Americana
  - Britney Spears, ...Baby One More Time
  - Ricky Martin, Ricky Martin
  - Celine Dion, These Are Special Times
- 2001 - Eminem, The Marshall Mathers LP
  - Enrique Iglesias, Enrique
  - Creed, Human Clay
  - NSYNC, No Strings Attached
  - Britney Spears, Oops!... I Did It Again
- 2002 - Shaggy, Hot Shot
  - U2, All That You Can't Leave Behind
  - Backstreet Boys, Black & Blue
  - Limp Bizkit, Chocolate Starfish and the Hot Dog Flavored Water
  - Destiny's Child, Survivor

=== International Album of the Year (2003–2024) ===
==== 2000s ====
- 2003 - Eminem, The Eminem Show
  - Creed, Weathered
  - Enrique Iglesias, Escape
  - Nelly, Nellyville
  - Shakira, Laundry Service
- 2004 - 50 Cent, Get Rich or Die Tryin'
  - Christina Aguilera, Stripped
  - Hilary Duff, Metamorphosis
  - Evanescence, Fallen
  - Rod Stewart, It Had to Be You: The Great American Songbook
- 2005 - Green Day, American Idiot
  - Usher, Confessions
  - Eminem, Encore
  - Norah Jones, Feels Like Home
  - U2, How to Dismantle an Atomic Bomb
- 2006 - The Black Eyed Peas, Monkey Business and Coldplay, X&Y (Tie)
  - Kelly Clarkson, Breakaway
  - Gwen Stefani, Love. Angel. Music. Baby.
  - 50 Cent, The Massacre
- 2007 - Dixie Chicks, Taking the Long Way
  - Il Divo, Ancora
  - Madonna, Confessions on a Dance Floor
  - Justin Timberlake, FutureSex/LoveSounds
  - Red Hot Chili Peppers, Stadium Arcadium
- 2008 - Rihanna, Good Girl Gone Bad
  - Fergie, The Dutchess
  - Bon Jovi, Lost Highway
  - Josh Groban, Noël
  - Timbaland, Shock Value
- 2009 - Coldplay, Viva la Vida or Death and All His Friends
  - AC/DC, Black Ice
  - Guns N' Roses, Chinese Democracy
  - Metallica, Death Magnetic
  - Jack Johnson, Sleep Through the Static

==== 2010s ====
- 2010 - Kings of Leon, Only by the Night
  - Britney Spears, Circus
  - The Black Eyed Peas, The E.N.D
  - Taylor Swift, Fearless
  - Susan Boyle, I Dreamed a Dream
- 2011 - Katy Perry, Teenage Dream
  - Kesha, Animal
  - Lady Antebellum, Need You Now
  - Eminem, Recovery
  - Taylor Swift, Speak Now
- 2012 - Adele, 21
  - Coldplay, Mylo Xyloto
  - Lady Gaga, Born This Way
  - LMFAO, Sorry for Party Rocking
  - Rihanna, Loud
- 2013 - Mumford & Sons, Babel
  - Maroon 5, Overexposed
  - One Direction, Up All Night
  - Rod Stewart, Merry Christmas, Baby
  - Taylor Swift, Red
- 2014 - Bruno Mars, Unorthodox Jukebox
  - Eminem, The Marshall Mathers LP 2
  - Imagine Dragons, Night Visions
  - One Direction, Take Me Home
  - Pink, The Truth About Love
- 2015 - Sam Smith, In the Lonely Hour
  - Katy Perry, Prism
  - Lorde, Pure Heroine
  - One Direction, Midnight Memories
  - Taylor Swift, 1989
- 2016 - Adele, 25
  - One Direction, Four
  - Hozier, Hozier
  - Meghan Trainor, Title
  - Vance Joy, Dream Your Life Away
- 2017 - Coldplay, A Head Full of Dreams
  - Rihanna, Anti
  - Sia, This Is Acting
  - One Direction, Made in the A.M.
  - Ariana Grande, Dangerous Woman
- 2018 - Kendrick Lamar, Damn
  - Bruno Mars, 24K Magic
  - Ed Sheeran, ÷
  - Post Malone, Stoney
  - Taylor Swift, Reputation
- 2019 - Post Malone, Beerbongs & Bentleys
  - Camila Cabello, Camila
  - Cardi B, Invasion of Privacy
  - Maroon 5, Red Pill Blues
  - Travis Scott, Astroworld

==== 2020s ====
- 2020 - Billie Eilish, When We All Fall Asleep, Where Do We Go?
  - Ariana Grande, Thank U, Next
  - Khalid, Free Spirit
  - Post Malone, Hollywood's Bleeding
  - Ed Sheeran, No.6 Collaborations Project
- 2021 - Harry Styles, Fine Line
  - Luke Combs, What You See Is What You Get
  - Eminem, Music to Be Murdered By
  - Pop Smoke, Shoot for the Stars, Aim for the Moon
  - Taylor Swift, Folklore
- 2022 - Olivia Rodrigo, Sour
  - Adele, 30
  - Doja Cat, Planet Her
  - The Kid Laroi, F*ck Love 3: Over You
  - Taylor Swift, Evermore
- 2023 - Harry Styles, Harry's House
  - Ed Sheeran, =
  - Lil Nas X, Montero
  - Taylor Swift, Red (Taylor's Version)
  - Taylor Swift, Midnights
- 2024 - SZA, SOS
  - Luke Combs, Gettin' Old
  - Metro Boomin, Heroes & Villains
  - Taylor Swift, 1989 (Taylor's Version)
  - Morgan Wallen, One Thing at a Time
