= Juno Award for Album Artwork of the Year =

Canadian music award

- Description: Recognition for the best album art for a music recording in Canada
- Country: Canada
- Presented by: Canadian Academy of Recording Arts and Sciences (CARAS)

The Juno Award for "Album Artwork of the Year" has been awarded since 1975, as recognition each year for the best album art for a music recording in Canada. The Award was subtitled as "Presented in honour of Andrew MacNaughtan" after MacNaughtan's death in early 2012. The award was previously known as "Best Album Graphics", "Best Album Design", "Album Design of the Year", "CD/DVD Artwork Design of the Year", and "Recording Package of the Year".

== Winners ==
=== Best Album Graphics (1975–1989) ===
- 1975 - Bart Schoales, Night Vision (Bruce Cockburn)
- 1976 - Bart Schoales, Joy Will Find a Way (Bruce Cockburn)
- 1977 - Michael Bowness, Ian Tamblyn (self-titled)
- 1978 - Dave Anderson, Short Turn (self-titled)
- 1979 - Alan Gee/Greg Lawson, Madcats (self-titled)
- 1980 - Rodney Bowes, Cigarettes (Battered Wives)
- 1981 - Jeanette Hanna, We Deliver (Downchild Blues Band)
- 1982 - Hugh Syme/Deborah Samuel, Moving Pictures (Rush)
- 1983 - Dean Motter, Metal on Metal (Anvil)
- 1984 - Dean Motter/Jeff Jackson/Deborah Samuel, Seamless (The Nylons)
- 1985 - Rob MacIntyre/Dimo Safari, Strange Animal (Gowan)
- 1986 - Hugh Syme/Dimo Safari, Power Windows (Rush)
- 1987 - Jamie Bennett/Shari Spier, Small Victories] (The Parachute Club)
- 1989 - Hugh Syme, Levity (Ian Thomas)

=== Best Album Design (1990–2002) ===
- 1990 - Hugh Syme, Presto (Rush)
- 1991 - Robert Lebeuf, Sue Medley (self-titled)
- 1992 - Hugh Syme, Roll The Bones (Rush)
- 1993 - Rebecca Baird/Kenny Baird, Lost Together (Blue Rodeo)
- 1994 - Marty Dolan, Faithlift (Spirit of the West)
- 1995 - Andrew MacNaughtan/Our Lady Peace, Naveed (Our Lady Peace)
- 1996 - Tom Wilson/Alex Wittholz, Birthday Boy
- 1997 - John Rummen/Crystal Heald, Decadence - Ten Years of Various Nettwerk
- 1998 - John Rummen/Crystal Heald/Stephen Chung/Andrew MacNaughtan/Justin Zivojinovich, Songs of a Circling Spirit (Tom Cochrane)
- 1999 - Andrew McLachlan/Rob Baker/Brock Ostrom/Bernard Clark/David Ajax, Phantom Power (The Tragically Hip)
- 2000 - Michael Wrycraft (Creative Director), Radio Fusebox by Andy Stochansky
- 2001 - Stuart Chatwood (Creative Director), Antoine Moonen (Graphic Artist), James St. Laurent/Margaret Malandruccolo/Nick Sarros (Photographers), Tangents: The Tea Party Collection (The Tea Party)
- 2002 - Sebastien Toupin (Art Director), Sebastien Toupin, Benoit St-Jean, Michel Valois (Designers), Martin Tremblay (Photographer), Disparu (La Chicane)

=== Album Design of the Year (2003–2004) ===
- 2003 - Steve Goode (Director/Designer), Margaret Malandruccolo/Nelson Garcia (Illustrator/Photographer), exit (k-os)
- 2004 - Garnet Armstrong/Susan Michalek (Director/Designer); Andrew MacNaughtan (Photographer), Love Is the Only Soldier (Jann Arden)

=== CD/DVD Artwork Design of the Year (2005–2009) ===
- 2005 - Vincent Marcone (Director/Designer/Illustrator), It Dreams (Jakalope)
- 2006 - Garnet Armstrong, Rob Baker, Susan Michalek, Will Ruocco, Hipeponymous (The Tragically Hip)
- 2007 - Seripop (Directors/Designers/Illustrators), The Looks (MSTRKRFT)
- 2008 - Tracy Maurice and Francois Miron, Neon Bible (Arcade Fire)
- 2009 - Anouk Pennel and Stéphane Poirer, En concert dans la forêt des mal-aimés avec l’Orchestre Métropolitain du Grand Montréal (Pierre Lapointe)

=== Recording Package of the Year (2010–2017) ===
- 2010 - Martin Bernard (Art Director), Stéphane Cocke (Photographer), Thomas Csano (Designer/Illustrator): Beats on Canvas (Beats on Canvas)
- 2011 - Justin Peroff, Charles Spearin, Robyn Kotyk & Joe McKay (Art Directors/Designers), Jimmy Collins & Elisabeth Chicoine (Photographers): Forgiveness Rock Record (vinyl box set) (Broken Social Scene)
- 2012 - Jeff Harrison (Designer), Kim Ridgewell (Illustrator): Rest of the Story (Chris Tarry)
- 2013 - Justin Broadbent (Art Director/Designer/Photographer): Synthetica (Metric)
- 2014 - Robyn Kotyk (Art Director/Designer/Illustrator), Petra Cuschieri, Justin Peroff (Designers): Arts & Crafts: 2003–2013 (Arts & Crafts Various Artists)
- 2015 - Roberta Hansen (Art Director/Designer/Illustrator), Mike Latschislaw (Photographer): Pilgrimage (Steve Bell)
- 2016 - Clyde Henry Productions (Chris Lavis and Maciek Szczerbowski) (Art Directors/Designers/Illustrators/Photographers), Constellation: Ian Ilavsky (Designer): Lost Voices (Esmerine)
- 2017 - Jonathan Shedletzky (Art Director), Isis Essery (Designer), Jeff Lemire (Illustrator): Secret Path (Gord Downie)

=== Album Artwork of the year (2018-present) ===
- 2018 - Marianne Collins, Ian Ilavsky and Steve Farmer — Stubborn Persistent Illusions (Do Make Say Think)
- 2019 - Mike Milosh (art director, designer, illustrator and photographer) — Rhye, Blood
- 2020 - Chad Moldenhauer (art director), Ian Clarke (designer), Warren Clark and Lance Inkwell (illustrators) - Kristofer Maddigan, Selections from Cuphead
- 2021 - Julien Hébert (art director), David Beauchemin (designer), Florence Obrecht (illustrator) and Marc-Étienne Mongrain (photographer) — Klô Pelgag, Notre-Dame-des-Sept-Douleurs
- 2022 - Mykaël Nelson, Nicolas Lemieux, Albert Zablit — Montreal Symphony Orchestra conducted by Simon Leclerc, Histoires sans paroles: Harmonium symphonique
- 2023 - Ian Ilavsky (art director and designer), Maciek Szczerbowski (illustrator) — Everything Was Forever Until It Was No More, Esmerine
- 2024 - Nicolas Lemieux, Mykaël Nelson, Albert Zablit — Montreal Symphony Orchestra, Riopelle symphonique
- 2025 - Keenan Gregory — Altruistic, Royal Tusk
- 2026 - Kevin Moore and Kyle Joinson — Tsunami Sea, Spiritbox
