= Siobhan Crawley =

Canadian pop singer

- Genres: pop
- Occupation: Singer
- Instrument: Vocals
- Years active: 1980s
- Label: Freedom Records Inc.

Siobhan Crawley is a Canadian pop singer, who received a Juno Award nomination for Most Promising Female Vocalist at the Juno Awards of 1986.

Crawley initially worked as a model before recording and releasing her debut album Somewhere in Between in 1983. In 1985, she released three new singles, "Closer", "You're in Love Again" and "The Best Way", which all received airplay on radio stations in Toronto and resulted in her Juno Award nomination. In 1987, she appeared as a guest vocalist on the album Acappella Christmas by the a cappella vocal group The Mistletones. Her second and final solo album, Without Warning, followed in 1988.
