= Demo Cates =

American-Canadian musician

Demetrius (Demo) Cates is an American-Canadian musician. He is most noted as a two-time Juno Award nominee for R&B/Soul Recording of the Year, receiving nominations at the Juno Awards of 1985 for "Memories of Moments" and at the Juno Awards of 1989 for "Secret Love", a duet with Debbie Johnson.

Cates began his musical career in Detroit, Michigan as a member of the soul/funk band The Fabulous Counts. After that band recorded part of its 1971 album What's Up Front That Counts in Toronto, Ontario, Cates opted to stay in the city, performing as a session musician for Lenny Breau and Wayne St. John.

In 1981 he collaborated with Bobby Boyer and Jay W. McGee on Rap the Night Away, which has been credited as the first known full-length Canadian hip hop album. He recorded a number of soul, rhythm and blues and jazz singles, and was a regular performer in Toronto jazz clubs.

Although principally a saxophonist, Cates has also performed as a jazz and R&B vocalist. He has also had occasional supporting or guest roles as an actor, including in the television series Forever Knight, Goosebumps and The Jane Show, and the films Blues Brothers 2000 and A Raisin in the Sun.
