= Juno Award for International Entertainer of the Year =

Canadian music award

The Juno Award for "International Entertainer of the Year" was awarded from 1989 - 1993, as recognition for the best international musicians, from a Canadian perspective.

== Winners ==
Year	Recipient	Nominee
International Entertainer of the Year (1989~1991)
1989	U2	Crowded House; INXS; Michael Jackson; George Michael
1990	Melissa Etheridge	Crowded House; Steve Earle; Rod Stewart; Randy Travis
1991	The Rolling Stones	Aerosmith; Phil Collins; Madonna; Sinéad O'Connor
Foreign Entertainer of the Year (1992~1992)
1992	Garth Brooks	Michael Bolton; Phil Collins; MC Hammer; Rod Stewart
International Entertainer of the Year (1993~1993)
1993	U2	Garth Brooks; Genesis; Red Hot Chili Peppers; Bruce Springsteen
