= Straight Clean & Simple =

- Origin: Canada
- Genres: Country
- Years active: 1990-1995
- Labels: Hillcrest
- Past members: Larry Lee Vannatta; Marina Vannatta; Ted J. Lloyd; Bob Macgillivray; Darcy Watmough; Larry McIntosh; Tim Burles; Glenn Baker

Straight Clean & Simple was a Canadian country music group. They were nominated for Best Country Group or Duo at the Juno Awards in 1992 and 1993. Their 1994 single "Hillbilly Jane" reached the Top 20 of the RPM Country Tracks chart.

== Discography ==
=== Albums ===
Year	Album	Label
1990	Second to None	Hillcrest
1992	Iron Lady	Hillcrest
1995	Dead Horse Lake	Hillcrest

=== Singles ===
Year	Single	CAN Country	Album
1990	"Don't Worry About Me"	58	Iron Lady
1990	"Every Goodbye Means Hello"	43	Iron Lady
1992	"What You Get-Is What You See"	58	Iron Lady
1993	"Country Junkie"	65	Dead Horse Lake
1994	"Raised on Country"	60	Dead Horse Lake
1994	"Hillbilly Jane"	15	Dead Horse Lake
1995	"Midnight Special"	61	Dead Horse Lake
1995	"Til the River Runs Dry"	30	Dead Horse Lake
