= Jay W. McGee =

American singer (1950–2021)

James Wesley McGee (January 23, 1950 – January 8, 2021) was an American-Canadian musician. He was most noted for several early rap singles released under the stage name Mr. Q, including "Ladies Delight", the first known Canadian hip hop single.

== Background ==
A native of Fayetteville, North Carolina, McGee moved to Flint, Michigan, in 1968 to work at the General Motors plant. After visiting Toronto, Ontario, several times, he moved to the city in 1974. In Toronto, he began to work as a musician, performing with bands such as Giant Step, Salongo and Crack of Dawn over the course of his career.

== Mr. Q ==
In 1979, George Lewis of Monica’s Productions (later to become Scorpio Records) hired McGee to rap on "Ladies Delight", a response track to The Sugarhill Gang's "Rapper's Delight". Released just a few weeks after "Rapper's Delight", the song was based around a rerecording of the hook from Cameo's contemporaneous single "I Just Want to Be". He recorded a number of other rap/hip hop songs over the next few months as Mr. Q, including "DJ Style", "Rapping Time", "Party, Party" and "Party Rapp"; "Party Rapp" included lyrics about the 1979 Mississauga train derailment, the first explicit indication in any of the Mr. Q singles that they were actually written and performed by Canadians. "DJ Style" was included in the 2006 hip hop compilation album Big Apple Rappin'.

He was also featured on Rap the Night Away, a 1981 album by Bobby Boyer and Demo Cates which has been credited as the first full-length Canadian hip hop album.

== Solo career ==
He released the solo album Over & Over in 1982 under his own name. The album featured the single "When We Party (Uptown, Downtown)", which was popular in dance clubs but did not become a charting breakthrough hit as McGee could not afford to undertake a major tour. His single "Another Love in Your Life", from his 1988 album Survivor, received a Juno Award nomination for Best R&B Soul Recording at the Juno Awards of 1990. In 1991, he was invited to sing "O Canada" at a Toronto Blue Jays game.

Throughout his career, McGee also worked as an educational assistant and Black history teacher at Park Public School in the Regent Park neighbourhood of Toronto.

In 1999, McGee moved back to Flint, where he worked as a church choir director and gospel music performer. In 2016 he recorded a song, "Don't Drink the Water", about the Flint water crisis. He released his seventh and final album, Smooth Cruising, in 2020, soon before his death in January 2021.

McGee died from complications of COVID-19 in Flint on January 8, 2021, at the age of 70.

== Discography ==
=== Albums ===
- Rap the Night Away (1981, with Bobby Boyer and Demo Cates)
- Over & Over (1982)
- Survivor (1988)
- I Hear Foot Steps (1998)
- No Walls (2001)
- Good Feeling (2015)
- Smooth Cruising (2020)

=== Singles ===
- "Ladies Delight" (1979, as Mr. Q)
- "DJ Style" (1979, as Mr. Q)
- "Rapping Time" (1979, as Mr. Q)
- "Party, Party" (1979, as Mr. Q)
- "Party Rapp" (1979, as Mr. Q)
- "Turn Me On" b/w "Your Love" (1980)
- "She's Got the Papers But You Got the Key" (1981, with Sattalites)
- "One Draw" (1981, with Sattalites)
- "When We Party" (1982)
- "Crack Attack" b/w "Destiny" (1986, with Jo Perri)
- "21st Century Dreamer" (1986)
- "I'm a Survivor" b/w "Blame It on the Moonlight" (1988 )
- "My Baby Loves Me" b/w "If the Love Fits" (1988)
- "Another Love in Your Life" b/w "Let's Do It Again" (1988)
- "Good Feeling" (2015)
- "Let's Fall in Love" (2015)
- "Perfection" b/w "Love in Motion" (2017)
