= Nuance (Canadian band) =

- Origin: Gatineau, Quebec, Canada
- Genres: pop rock
- Years active: 1975–aft. 1988
- Past members: Sandra Dorion; Denis Lalonde; Mario Dubé; Mario Laniel; Daniel King

Nuance was a Canadian rock band from Gatineau, Quebec, best known for their hit single "Vivre dans la nuit".

== History ==
Formed in 1975 by guitarist Denis Lalonde, keyboardist Mario Dubé, bassist Mario Laniel, and drummer Daniel King, the band began achieving wider success after singer Sandra Dorion joined in 1983. They had their first significant hit with "Amour sans romance" in 1985, and "Vivre dans la nuit", their most successful single, was its followup. Both singles were featured on the album Vivre dans la nuit (1986).

The band received two Juno Award nominations at the Juno Awards of 1987, for Most Promising Group and Single of the Year for "Vivre dans la nuit". They also won two Prix Félix in the same era, for Discovery of the Year in 1986 and Best-Selling Single of the Year for "Vivre dans la nuit" in 1987.

They followed up with À suivre, an album of covers of Quebec pop and rock classics by Offenbach, Beau Dommage, Robert Charlebois, Michel Pagliaro, and Serge Fiori in 1987. The album was credited to Nuance & Sandra. Their third and final album, Journal intime, was released in 1988.

Following the band's breakup, Luc Plamondon solicited Dorion to appear in a production of Starmania, and Cirque du Soleil invited her to sing the theme song for Alegría, although she refused both offers. She released her debut solo album, Telle quelle, in 2011.
