= Don Neilson =

- Origin: Toronto, Ontario, Canada
- Genres: Country
- Occupation: Singer-songwriter
- Instrument(s): Vocals, guitar
- Years active: 1992–1997
- Labels: Epic

Don Neilson is a Canadian country music artist best known for three studio albums released through Epic Records in the 1990s. He charted twelve singles on the Canadian country music charts, of which the highest was "You're My Hometown", peaking at #9 in 1993. Neilson was nominated for two Juno Awards in 1993 for Most Promising Male Vocalist and Best Country Male Vocalist, and again for the latter in 1996.

== Discography ==
=== Albums ===
Year	Title
1992	The Other Side of You
1994	Based on a True Story
1996	…Or Is It Just Me?

=== Singles ===
Year	Title	CAN Country	Album
1992	"Still in the Game"	10	The Other Side of You
1992	"The Other Side of You"	22	The Other Side of You
1993	"You're My Hometown"	9	The Other Side of You
1993	"Let Me Be the One"		The Other Side of You
1994	"Country in the City"	10	Based on a True Story
1994	"Tell Me the Lie"	15	Based on a True Story
1995	"Rusted Hinges"	46	Based on a True Story
1995	"Easy to Say"	37	Based on a True Story
1995	"World to Me"	60	Based on a True Story
1996	"Love That I Deserve"	29	Based on a True Story
1996	"Sadie's Kitchen"	23	…Or Is It Just Me?
1997	"Home of the Brave"	60	…Or Is It Just Me?
1997	"High and Outside"	66	…Or Is It Just Me?
1997	"In My Day"		…Or Is It Just Me?
