= Juno Award for Breakthrough Group of the Year =

Juno Awards

The Juno Award for Breakthrough Group of the Year is presented by the Canadian Academy of Recording Arts and Sciences to the best new musical group in Canada. The award has been given annually since 1974, and was previously called Most Promising Group of the Year (1974–1993), Best New Group (1994–2002), and New Group of the Year (2003–2012). The award was customarily presented by the Minister of Canadian Heritage.

The award was discontinued following the Juno Awards of 2024. At the following Juno Awards of 2025, it was merged with the sibling category for Breakthrough Artist of the Year into a single category for Breakthrough Artist or Group of the Year.

== Recipients ==
=== Most Promising Group of the Year (1974–1993) ===
Year	Winner	Nominees	Refs.
1974	Bachman-Turner Overdrive	Bearfoot; Chester; Scrubbaloe Caine; Wednesday	
1975	Rush	Beau Dommage; Greaseball Boogie Band; Mahogany Rush; Ville Émard Blues Band	
1976	Myles & Lenny	Aut'Chose; Bond; Heart; Maneige	
1977	THP Orchestra	Garfield; Moxy; Sweeney Todd; Trooper	
1978	Hometown Band	Black Light Orchestra; Jackson Hawke; Max Webster; Prism	
1979	Doucette	Max Webster; Streetheart; Teaze; Zon	
1980	Streetheart	FM; The Minglewood Band; Teaze; The Raes	
1981	Powder Blues	Loverboy; Martha & the Muffins; Red Rider; Toronto	
1982	Saga	Goddo; Martha & the Muffins; Red Rider; The Kings	
1983	Payola$	Doug & the Slugs; Headpins; Spoons; Strange Advance	
1984	The Parachute Club	Honeymoon Suite; Men Without Hats; Platinum Blonde; The Nylons	
1985	Idle Eyes	Images in Vogue; Rational Youth; The Arrows; The Box	
1986	Glass Tiger	Cats Can Fly; Chalk Circle; Eye Eye; One to One	
1987	Frozen Ghost	Eight Seconds; Haywire; Nuance; The Partland Brothers	
No award ceremony was held in 1988
1989	Barney Bentall & The Legendary Hearts	54-40; The Jitters; The Northern Pikes; The Pursuit of Happiness	
1990	The Tragically Hip	Brighton Rock; Indio; Paradox; Sons of Freedom	
1991	Leslie Spit Treeo	Bootsauce; Crash Vegas; National Velvet; Spirit of the West	
1992	Infidels	The Rankin Family; West End Girls; World on Edge; Young Saints	
1993	Skydiggers	Lost & Profound; Pure; Slik Toxik; Sven Gali	

=== Best New Group (1994–2002) ===
Year	Winner	Nominees	Refs.
1994	The Waltons	Moxy Früvous; Junkhouse; Sloan; The Odds; The Tea Party	
1995	Moist	Big Sugar; Farmer's Daughter; The Gandharvas; Wild Strawberries	
1996	Philosopher Kings	Hemingway Corner; Rainbow Butt Monkeys; Rymes with Orange; Sandbox	
1997	The Killjoys	Limblifter; Pluto; Starkicker; Victor	
1998	Leahy	Bran Van 3000; Matthew Good Band; The Age of Electric; Wide Mouth Mason	
1999	Johnny Favourite Swing Orchestra	Love Inc.; New Meanies; The Moffatts; The Wilkinsons	
2000	Sky	Gob; Len; Prozzäk; Serial Joe	
2001	Nickelback	b4-4; Kittie; Sum 41; Templar	
2002	Default	Joydrop; Smoother; Sugar Jones; Wave	

=== New Group of the Year (2003–2012) ===
Year	Winner	Nominees	Refs.
2003	Theory of a Deadman	Bet.e & Stef; Crush; One Ton; Simple Plan	
2004	Billy Talent	Lillix; The Dears; The Trews; Three Days Grace	
2005	Alexisonfire	Death From Above; The Marble Index; The Waking Eyes; Thornley	
2006	Bedouin Soundclash	Boys Night Out; Hedley; Pocket Dwellers; Silverstein	
2007	Mobile	Evans Blue; Idle Sons; Jets Overhead; Stabilo	
2008	Wintersleep	Dragonette; Faber Drive; illScarlett; State of Shock	
2009	The Stills	Beast; Cancer Bats; Crystal Castles; Plants and Animals	
2010	Arkells	Down With Webster; Stereos; Ten Second Epic; The New Cities	
2011	Said the Whale	Die Mannequin; Hollerado; Misteur Valaire; My Darkest Days	
2012	The Sheepdogs	Braids; Hey Rosetta!; Mother Mother; The Rural Alberta Advantage	

=== Breakthrough Group of the Year (2013–2024) ===
Year	Winner	Nominees	Refs.
2013	Monster Truck	Hey Ocean!; The Pack A.D.; Walk Off the Earth; Yukon Blonde	
2014	A Tribe Called Red	Autumn Hill; Born Ruffians; Courage My Love; July Talk	
2015	Magic!	Adventure Club; Alvvays; USS; Zeds Dead	
2016	Dear Rouge	The Elwins; Half Moon Run; Milk & Bone; Young Empires	
2017	The Dirty Nil	Bleeker; Cold Creek County; Bob Moses; The Zolas	
2018	The Beaches	James Barker Band; The Dead South; The Franklin Electric; The Jerry Cans	
2019	The Washboard Union	88Glam; Dizzy; Elijah Woods x Jamie Fine; Loud Luxury	
2020	Neon Dreams	The Blue Stones; Hunter Brothers; Palaye Royale; Valley	
2021	Crown Lands	2Frères; Manila Grey; Peach Pit; Young Bombs	
2022	Monowhales	Black Pistol Fire; Cleopatrick; Ocie Elliott; Spiritbox	
2023	Banx & Ranx	Harm & Ease; Rare Americans; Tommy Lefroy; Wild Rivers	
2024	New West	Busty and the Bass; Crash Adams; Good Kid; Men I Trust	
