= Juno Award for Best Selling Single =

Canadian music award

The Juno Award for Best Selling Single was awarded during 1975–1993 for the best selling single in Canada. It was also known as Best Selling International Single and as International Single of the Year.

Not to be confused with the Juno Award for Single of the Year.

== Winners ==
=== Best Selling International Single (1975–1980) ===
- 1975 – Paper Lace, "The Night Chicago Died"
  - Paul McCartney & Wings, "Band on the Run"
  - Ray Stevens, "The Streak"
  - Charlie Rich, "The Most Beautiful Girl"
  - George McCrae, "Rock Your Baby"
- 1976 – The Captain and Tennille, "Love Will Keep Us Together"
  - Carol Douglas. "Doctor's Orders"
  - Dickie Goodman, "Mr. Jaws"
  - KC and the Sunshine Band, "That's the Way (I Like It)"
  - Shirley & Company, "Shame, Shame, Shame"
- 1977 – Tina Charles, "I Love to Love (But My Baby Loves to Dance)"
  - Bay City Rollers, "Saturday Night"
  - Rick Dees, "Disco Duck"
  - KC and the Sunshine Band, "That's the Way (I Like It)"
  - Walter Murphy, "A Fifth of Beethoven"
- 1978 – Leo Sayer, "When I Need You"
  - Debby Boone, "You Light Up My Life"
  - Donna Summer, "I Feel Love"
  - Elvis Presley, "My Way"
  - Meco, "Star Wars Theme"
- 1979 – John Travolta & Olivia Newton-John, "You're the One That I Want"
  - Bee Gees, "Night Fever"
  - Bee Gees, "Stayin' Alive"
  - Frankie Valli, "Grease"
  - A Taste of Honey, "Boogie Oogie Oogie"
- 1980 – Blondie, "Heart of Glass"
  - Patrick Hernandez, "Born to Be Alive"
  - Rod Stewart, "Da Ya Think I'm Sexy?"
  - Chic, "Le Freak"
  - Village People, "Y.M.C.A."

=== International Single of the Year (1981–1991) ===
- 1981 – Pink Floyd, "Another Brick in the Wall"
  - Queen, "Another One Bites the Dust"
  - Lipps Inc., "Funkytown"
  - Billy Joel, "It's Still Rock and Roll to Me"
  - The Sugarhill Gang, "Rapper's Delight"
- 1982 – Kim Carnes, "Bette Davis Eyes"
  - Kool & the Gang, "Celebration"
  - Diana Ross & Lionel Richie, "Endless Love"
  - Stars on 45, "Stars on 45" (Medley: "Venus" / "Sugar, Sugar" / "No Reply" / "I'll Be Back" / "Drive My Car" / "Do You Want to Know a Secret" / "We Can Work It Out" / "I Should Have Known Better" / "Nowhere Man" / "You're Going to Lose That Girl" / "Stars on 45".)
  - Blondie, "The Tide Is High"
- 1983 – Survivor, "Eye of the Tiger"
  - Steve Miller Band, "Abracadabra"
  - Trio, "Da Da Da"
  - Joan Jett and the Blackhearts, "I Love Rock 'n' Roll"
  - Olivia Newton-John, "Physical"
- 1984 – Michael Jackson, "Billie Jean"
  - The Police, "Every Breath You Take"
  - Kenny Rogers & Dolly Parton, "Islands in the Stream"
  - David Bowie, "Let's Dance"
  - Cyndi Lauper, "Girls Just Want to Have Fun"
- 1985 – Foreigner, "I Want to Know What Love Is"
  - Wham!, "Careless Whisper"
  - Stevie Wonder, "I Just Called to Say I Love You"
  - Tears for Fears, "Shout"
  - Wham!, "Wake Me Up Before You Go-Go"
- 1986 – Opus, "Live Is Life"
  - Kool & the Gang, "Cherish"
  - Elton John, "Nikita"
  - Falco, "Rock Me Amadeus"
  - Lionel Richie, "Say You, Say Me"
- 1987 – Bananarama, "Venus"
  - Madonna, "Papa Don't Preach"
  - Timex Social Club, "Rumours"
  - Chris de Burgh, "The Lady in Red"
  - Samantha Fox, "Touch Me (I Want Your Body)"
- 1989 – MARRS, "Pump Up the Volume"
  - George Michael, "Faith"
  - Phil Collins, "A Groovy Kind of Love"
  - Tiffany, "I Think We're Alone Now"
  - Kylie Minogue, "The Locomotion"
- 1990 – Jive Bunny and the Mastermixers, "Swing the Mood"
  - New Kids on the Block, "Hangin' Tough"
  - Madonna, "Like a Prayer"
  - Fine Young Cannibals, "She Drives Me Crazy"
  - Paula Abdul, "Straight Up"
- 1991 – Madonna, "Vogue"
  - Soul II Soul, "Back to Life (However Do You Want Me)"
  - Kaoma, "Lambada"
  - New Kids on the Block, "Step by Step"
  - Poison, "Unskinny Bop"

=== Best Selling Single by a Foreign Artist (1992) ===
- 1992 – Extreme, "More Than Words"
  - Michael Jackson, "Black or White"
  - Metallica, "Enter Sandman"
  - Roxette, "Joyride"
  - EMF, "Unbelievable"

=== Best Selling Single (Foreign or Domestic) (1993) ===
- 1993 – Billy Ray Cyrus, "Achy Breaky Heart"
  - Michael Jackson, "Black or White"
  - Kris Kross, "Jump"
  - The KLF, "Justified & Ancient"
  - KWS, "Please Don't Go"
