= Kim Richardson =

Canadian actor and singer (born 1965)

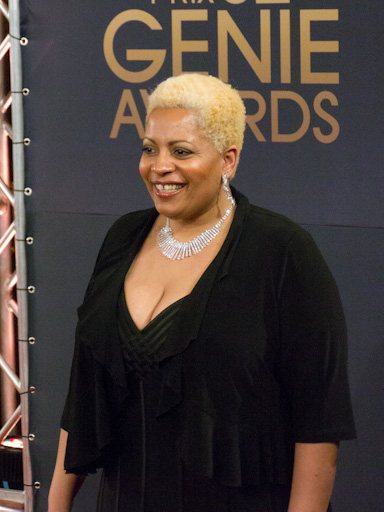
- Kim Richardson, March 2012

Background information
- Born: 22 December 1965 (age 60)
- Origin: Richmond Hill, Ontario, Canada
- Genres: R&B, soul, jazz, gospel, blues, dance-pop, musical theatre
- Occupations: Singer
- Years active: 1980s–present
- Website: www.kimrichardson.com

Kim Richardson (born 22 December 1965) is a Canadian singer and actress, who won two Juno Awards as a solo recording artist in the 1980s.

In 2017, she participated in over 150 shows, mostly in the province of Quebec.

== Early life and education ==
Richardson was born in Richmond Hill, Ontario, the daughter of singer and actress Jackie Richardson, the niece of blues and jazz singer Betty Richardson and the cousin of Polka Dot Door host Gairey Richardson.

== Career ==
Richardson began performing professionally in the early 1980s, both as a solo blues, jazz and R&B vocalist and with the family musical group The Richardsons.

Her first recording, the dance-pop single "He's My Lover", was released in 1985, and she won the award for Most Promising Female Vocalist at the Juno Awards of 1986. Her second single, "Peek-a-Boo" was released the following year and won the award for Best R&B/Soul Recording at the Juno Awards of 1987. The song was also named best single, and Richardson best female artist, at the 1987 Black Music Awards of Canada.

Her third single, "I Want It", followed in 1987. In the same year she participated in the recording of a Christmas charity single, "A Christmas Wish", with a lineup of Toronto-area performers that also included Billy Newton-Davis, Erroll Starr, Frozen Ghost, Prairie Oyster, Messenjah, The Pursuit of Happiness, Salome Bey, Zappacosta, Arlene Duncan and Lorraine Scott.

She subsequently moved to Montreal, Quebec, performing with the Montreal Jubilation Gospel Choir and Jim Hillman and the Merlin Factor. The latter band won a Juno Award for Best Contemporary Jazz Album at the Juno Awards of 1995.

She continued to perform in Montreal as a jazz singer, as a performer in musical theatre productions, in continued collaborations with her mother and as a backing vocalist for other musicians. Her first full-length album, Kaleidoscope, was released in 2006, and her second, Mes amours, followed in 2011. She participated in the recording of the soundtrack to the 2011 film Funkytown.

She has also collaborated frequently with singer-songwriter Jonathan Roy.
