= Debbie Johnson (singer) =

- Genres: R&B; Soul; Funk; Pop
- Occupation: Singer
- Years active: 1970s–1990s
- Label: Marigold Records
- Award: 6-time Juno Award nominee

Debbie Johnson is a Canadian former rhythm and blues singer, most noted as a six-time Juno Award nominee between 1987 and 1993.

She was first active in music as a child performer in the 1970s with The Johnson Family, a pop music group led by her parents, Ed and Angela Johnson, after they moved to Canada from Trinidad and Tobago. In the early 1980s she performed with the funk band Sweet Ecstasy. She signed to Rich Dodson's Marigold Records label in the latter half of the 1980s, releasing her debut single "Mama Said Why" in 1987. She was a Juno nominee for Most Promising Female Vocalist at the Juno Awards of 1987.

Her debut album, Just Like Magic, was released in 1988. At the Juno Awards of 1989 she received a Juno nomination for R&B/Soul Recording for the album's single "Secret Love", a duet with Demo Cates.

She followed up in 1989 with the album Touch the Sky, receiving another nomination at the Juno Awards of 1990 for the album's single "Mega Love".

Her third album, So Excited, was released in 1991, and garnered Juno nominations at the Juno Awards of 1992 for the singles "Let Me Go" and "I'll Respect You", and the Juno Awards of 1993 for "Power to the People".

== Awards ==
Award	Date of ceremony	Category	Work	Result	Ref.
Juno Awards	1987	Most Promising Female Vocalist		Nominated	
Juno Awards	1989	Best R&B/Soul Recording	"Secret Love" (with Demo Cates)	Nominated	
Juno Awards	1990	Best R&B/Soul Recording	"Mega Love"	Nominated	
Juno Awards	1992	Best R&B/Soul Recording	"Let Me Go"	Nominated	
Juno Awards	1992	Best Dance Recording	"I'll Respect You (Club Mix)"	Nominated	
Juno Awards	1993	Best R&B/Soul Recording	"Power to the People"	Nominated	
