= Juno Award for Entertainer of the Year =

Canadian music award

This is a list of the Canadian musical artists named Entertainer of the Year at the Juno Awards in those years in which this award or its nearest equivalent was awarded.

The award was created for the 1987 ceremony. The Canadian Academy of Recording Arts and Sciences created a list of 150 artists, from which members of the entertainment media selected 10 nominees, with the winner decided by a public vote. It was discontinued after 1996 and was replaced with a commercially sponsored Rock Album of the Year category.

== Winners ==
=== Canadian Entertainer of the Year (1987) ===
- 1987 – Bryan Adams

=== Canadian Entertainer of the Year (1989–1994) ===
- 1989 – Glass Tiger
- 1990 – The Jeff Healey Band
- 1991 – The Tragically Hip
- 1992 – Bryan Adams
- 1993 – The Tragically Hip
- 1994 – The Rankin Family

=== Entertainer of the Year (1995) ===
- 1995 – The Tragically Hip

=== Levi's Entertainer of the Year (1996) ===
- 1996 – Shania Twain
