= Véronique Béliveau =

Canadian actress and singer

- Born: Nicole Monique; January 24, 1955 (age 70); Montreal, Quebec, Canada
- Genres: Pop, rock
- Occupations: Singer, actress
- Years active: 1977-1989
- Labels: RCA, A&M

Véronique Béliveau (born January 24, 1955), originally Nicole Monique, is a Canadian actress and pop/rock singer who was nominated for a 1987 Juno Award for Female Vocalist of the Year. Her first full-length album was Prends-moi comme je suis in 1977. Her first English language album was Borderline in 1987, which was released under the single name Veronique. In 1985, she was one of a group of Canadian singers to make "Tears Are Not Enough" to raise funds to fight famine in Ethiopia. One of her high-profile performances was in the opening Gala for Expo 86.

Though mainly known as a singer, she was also an actress, appearing in the 1976 film Let's Talk About Love (Parlez-nous d'amour). Béliveau also appeared in a number of TV commercials for Simpsons.

== Discography ==
=== Albums ===
- 1977 Prends-moi comme je suis (RCA)
- 1980 Veronique Beliveau (RCA)
- 1983 Transit (A & M)
- 1985 Cover Girl Cache Ton Coeur (A & M)

Under the name Veronique (no last name)

- 1987 Borderline ( A & M)
- 1989 Veronique

=== Singles ===
- 1977 "Nous Partirons En Univers" (RCA)
- 1980 "Aimer" (RCA) Quebec #1
- 1983 "Je Suis Fidele" (A & M) Quebec #1
- 1983 "C'est Un Reveur" ( A& M) Quebec #1
- 1983 "That Boy" (A & M)
- 1984 "Please" (A & M)
- 1984 "Le Rock" (A & M)
- 1985 "Cover Girl(Cache Ton Coeur)" (A & M) Quebec #1
- 1985 "Je Suis Comme Je Suis" (A & M)
- 1985 "Toute La Nuit" (A & M)

Under the name Veronique (no last name)

- 1986 "Make A Move On Me" ( A & M) Canada #44
- 1987 "I Can't Help It" (A & M) Canada #85
- 1987 "Love You Like A Fire" (A & M)
- 1988 "Borderline" (A & M)
- 1989 "Jerusalem (A & M)" (duet with Marc Gabriel)
- 1989 "House of Love" (A & M) Canada #90
- 1990 "I'm Gonna Make You Love Me" (A & M)

=== Video clips ===
- 1985 Tears Are Not Enough (full-length documentary)
- 1986 Make A Move On Me
- 1987 I Can't Help It
- 1989 House Of Love

=== Other ===
With Northern Lights

- 1985 "Tears Are Not Enough"

== Footnotes ==
=== References ===
- "Béliveau, Véronique". The Canadian Encyclopedia. Historica Foundation of Canada.
- Veronique Beliveau at Allmusic.
