= Liberty Silver =

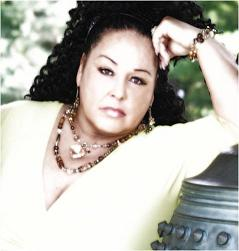
- Liberty Silver

Background information
- Born: Detroit, Michigan, U.S.
- Genres: R&B, Jazz, Reggae, Pop, Gospel, Rock
- Occupation: Singer
- Instrument: Vocals
- Website: rammitrecords.com/team/liberty-silver/

Liberty Silver (born 1961/1962) is a Canadian singer, based in Toronto, Ontario. Her music draws inspiration from genres including R&B, Jazz, Pop, Gospel, Reggae to Rock.

== Early life ==
Liberty Silver was born to a Jamaican-Irish mother and a Hawaiian father, who met while competing at the Commonwealth Games. Soon after birth, Silver was adopted into a household in Ontario, Canada. She grew up in cities in Ontario, including Kingston and Peterborough. She later discovered through Ontario adoption records that she has a biological brother who plays for an Ottawa-based band.

At 12 years old, Silver performed with a Toronto reggae band, The Wild Bunch, as an opening act for Bob Marley’s show at the Madison Square Garden in New York.

== Career ==
As the first Black woman to receive a Juno Award, Liberty Silver is known for paving the way for future generations of Black female artists in the Canadian music industry. She won two 1985 Juno Awards, one for Best R&B/Soul Recording of the Year ("Lost Somewhere Inside Your Love") and the other for Best Reggae/Calypso Recording ("Heaven Must Have Sent You" with Otis Gayle). She has been nominated for a Juno Award a total of five times, from 1985 to 1989.

At 12 years old, she performed in a reggae band as an opening act in New York City for Bob Marley at Madison Square Garden. In 2000, Silver hosted the TV series Centre Stage Chronicles, directed by Sylvia Sweeney and Aeyliya Husain, with guests including Martha Chaves and Carol Welsman.

As a member of supergroup Northern Lights, she appeared on the platinum-selling 1985 African charity ensemble single "Tears Are Not Enough", singing a duet with Mike Reno of Loverboy. Other artists on the track include Bryan Adams, Anne Murray, Gordon Lightfoot, and Joni Mitchell.

Silver competed as a vocalist on Star Search, winning the competition several weeks in a row. In 2016, she sang Amazing Grace at the funeral of former Toronto mayor Rob Ford. Other figures Silver performed for include U.S. President Barack Obama, Celine Dion, Desmond Tutu, and former President of the Soviet Union Mikhail Gorbachev.

Silver has appeared in music festivals including Niagara Jazz Festival, The Beaches International Jazz Festival, Antigua Jazz Festival, Ottawa Jazz Festival, Jamaican Air Canada Jazz Festival, Barbados Jazz Festival, Toronto Funk + Soul Festival to TRIUS Jazz Festival. She appeared as a musical guest on The Super Dave Osborne Show

=== Albums ===
- Live! In Session - Liberty Silver With The Bill King Quartet (1994)
- At Last (2005)
- A Timeless Christmas (2010)
- Groove Symphony (2010)
- Private Property (2012)

Liberty Silver with The Bill King Quartet (Details)
''Liberty Silver With The Bill King Quartet – Live! In Session''
- Type: Cassette album
- Released: 1994
- Record label: Radioland Jazz
Notes

| No. | Title | Length |
|---|---|---|
| 1. | "Ornithology" | 2:24 |
| 2. | "On a Clear Day" | 3:45 |
| 3. | "'Tain't Nobody's Business If I Do" | 4:48 |
| 4. | "'Round Midnight" | 4:37 |
| 5. | "May I Come In" | 4:17 |
| 6. | "Just One of Those Things" | 3:06 |
| 7. | "Crazy He Calls Me" | 4:13 |
| 8. | "Don't Cry Baby" | 3:01 |
| 9. | "Late Late Show" | 3:49 |
| 10. | "Fool That I Am" | 4:32 |
| 11. | "Fine and Mellow" | 7:50 |
| 12. | "I Was Lost, I Was Drifting" | 2:44 |

At Last (Details)
''At Last''
- Type: album
- Released: 2005
- Record label: Thunder Dome Sounds
Notes

| No. | Title | Length |
|---|---|---|
| 1. | "Your Sweet Love" | 3:56 |
| 2. | "You're the Only One for Me" | 4:22 |
| 3. | "Rain, Rain" | 4:22 |
| 4. | "Don't Ask My Neighbour" | 3:37 |
| 5. | "Jazz in the Eyes of God" | 4:33 |
| 6. | "My Funny Valentine" | 5:24 |
| 7. | "All in My Head" | 4:15 |
| 8. | "At Last" | 4:27 |
| 9. | "Living Without Your Love" | 4:27 |
| 10. | "Show Me the Way to Love" | 4:32 |
| 11. | "Alabama Blu" | 2:48 |

A Timeless Christmas (Details)
''A Timeless Christmas''
- Type: album
- Released: 2010
- Record label: Famous Records Corp.
Notes

| No. | Title | Length |
|---|---|---|
| 1. | "Let It Snow" | 4:14 |
| 2. | "Silent Night" | 4:04 |
| 3. | "Jingle Bells" | 3:52 |
| 4. | "Silver Bells" | 3:55 |
| 5. | "The Christmas Song" | 3:51 |
| 6. | "Winter Wonderland" | 4:22 |
| 7. | "Joy To The World" | 3:07 |
| 8. | "Frosty The Snowman" | 2:20 |
| 9. | "God Rest Ye Merry Gentlemen" | 3:32 |
| 10. | "Little Drummer Boy" | 3:43 |
| 11. | "O' Little Town of Bethlehem" | 2:32 |

Groove Symphony (Details)
''Groove Symphony''
- Type: Album
- Released: 2010
Note

| No. | Title | Length |
|---|---|---|
| 1. | "Who Will Save The World" | 4:32 |
| 2. | "All in my Mind" | 4:15 |
| 3. | "So Sexy" | 1:35 |
| 4. | "Money can't buy U Love" | 3:24 |
| 5. | "I got Angels" | 2:44 |
| 6. | "You're the Only One" | 4:22 |
| 7. | "Don't Ask My Neighbour" | 3:37 |
| 8. | "At Last" | 4:26 |

Private Property (Details)
''Private Property''
- Type: album
- Released: January 22, 2012
- Record label: WHATTAGUY MUSIC
Notes

| No. | Title | Length |
|---|---|---|
| 1. | "I Do Love You" | 3:58 |
| 2. | "Private Property" | 4:21 |
| 3. | "Let It Begin Tonight" | 4:23 |
| 4. | "Oh No" | 3:46 |
| 5. | "On My Way" | 3:39 |
| 6. | "Baby It's You" | 2:45 |
| 7. | "Can't Get Over You" | 4:39 |
| 8. | "It's You" | 3:47 |
| 9. | "Crazy Love For You" | 4.44 |
| 10. | "I Knew It Was You" | 3:54 |

=== Singles & EPs ===
- Rapture Rapp (1980)
- I Need Lovin (1980)
- Tide is High (1980)
- Magic (1981)
- The Sweetest Thing To Me (1983)
- Baby It's You (1988)
- Let It Begin Tonight (1988)
- My Desire (2016)
- Falling Again (2016)
