= Catherine Robbin =

Canadian mezzo-soprano

Catherine Robbin OC (born in Toronto, September 28, 1950) is a Canadian mezzo-soprano. She was elected an Officer of the Order of Canada in 2011.

Born in Toronto, Robbin studied at The Royal Conservatory of Music, and had private lessons in Paris and London. Much of her work has been in the field of early music; she has often sung and recorded with John Eliot Gardiner and the Monteverdi Choir, and has worked with Christopher Hogwood and the Academy of Ancient Music. She has performed roles in numerous Handel operas, including Medoro in Orlando, the title roles in Giulio Cesare and Floridante, and Eduige in Rodelinda; she has also sung Annio in La clemenza di Tito and Dido in Dido and Aeneas. In concert she has sung the Alto Rhapsody of Brahms, the Sea Pictures of Edward Elgar, and songs and cycles of Hector Berlioz and Gustav Mahler. Her final concert was in May 2003 at the Glenn Gould Studio. She taught voice at York University from 2000 to 2018.
