= Erroll Starr =

Canadian rhythm and blues singer

- Born: Jamaica
- Genres: Rhythm and Blues, Reggae, and Country
- Occupation: Musician
- Labels: A&M Records (1986–87), Asoma Records (1994)

Erroll Starr Francis is a Canadian rhythm and blues singer. He is most noted for winning the Juno Award for R&B/Soul Recording of the Year in 1989 for his single "Angel".

== Early life ==
Originally from Jamaica, Starr's family emigrated to the United Kingdom when he was two years old, after which they moved to Canada and settled in the Kitchener-Waterloo area. Starr began his musical journey when his father bought him his first guitar. He then began playing as a guitarist in his father's band. As a teenager, he obtained special permission from the LCBO to play as a minor in bars and clubs. His father was a reggae musician with the band People's Choice.

== Musical career ==
Starr built his early music career in Toronto, where concurrently with performing as an R&B singer he was also the front man of the rock band Harbinger.

He released the singles "Holding Out for You", "The Key" and "For the Love of Money" in 1986 and 1987, before releasing his debut album Temple of Love on A&M Records in 1987. In 1987, he also participated in the recording of a Christmas charity single, "A Christmas Wish", with a lineup of Toronto-area performers that also included Billy Newton-Davis, Kim Richardson, Frozen Ghost, Prairie Oyster, Messenjah, The Pursuit of Happiness, Salome Bey, Zappacosta, Arlene Duncan and Lorraine Scott.

He received his first Juno Award nomination in 1986 for "The Key", which was his highest charting single peaking at #57 in RPM Weekly, and his second in 1987 for "For the Love of Money". He also won the award for Best Male Artist at the Black Music Association of Canada awards in 1987. However, he was one of a number of Black Canadian musicians who faced heavy resistance from Canadian radio programmers in this era, and A&M did not renew his contract for another album.

In the early 1990s he moved to Hamilton, working as a record producer and recording music for film, television and commercials. During this era he formed a country music duo, North Starr, with colleague Mike Northcott, and released his second album, From the Inside Out, on the independent label Asoma Records in 1994.

He has continued to perform occasional live appearances at public events.

In 2024, Starr told his story in the Digital Sabbath Film Company short film, Temple of Love: The Errol Starr Story

Starr had also joined the Canadian rock group TRIBZ in 2021, which released its self-titled independently released album in 2024 followed by two singles, "Long Black Cadillac" and "Save The World" in 2025.

== Personal life ==
In the early 2000s, he and his family moved to Killaloe, where they built an environmentally sustainable off-the-grid home in the Earthship style.

His niece, Tasha Schumann, is a rapper who performs under the stage name Tasha the Amazon.
