= Candi & The Backbeat =

Canadian pop band

- Origin: North York (Toronto), Ontario, Canada
- Genres: Pop; Dance
- Years active: 1988-1991
- Label: I.R.S.
- Past members: Candita "Candi" Pennella; Nino (Big Papa) Milazzo; Paul (Baldy) Russo; Rich Imbrogno

Candi & The Backbeat (initially named Candi) was a Canadian pop band fronted by lead vocalist Candita "Candi" Pennella. Band members included Nino (Big Papa) Milazzo (bass and background vocals), Paul (Baldy) Russo (drums and percussion), and Rich Imbrogno (keyboards). The band is best known among U.S. audiences for the freestyle classic "Dancing Under a Latin Moon", a major dance hit which also made number 68 on the Billboard Hot 100 in 1988. Candi & the Backbeat also recorded a Spanish language version of "Dancing Under a Latin Moon" entitled "Luna Latina tú y yo".

== History ==
Originally an Italian wedding band, Candi released their debut self-titled album Candi in 1988 on the I.R.S. Records label. Their self-titled debut included "Dancing Under a Latin Moon" and "Under Your Spell." The latter was nominated for Single of the Year at the 1990 Juno Awards. "Under Your Spell" and "Missing You" were both nominated for Best Dance Recording at the same award show. The last single from the album "Love Makes No Promises" became Candi's highest charting single in Canada, peaking at #9 on the RPM Top Singles chart. The song was written by the band's producer, David Shaw, who also wrote "Missing You" and co-wrote "Friends Forever". Pennella was also nominated for Female Vocalist of the Year, losing to Rita MacNeil. Pennella was nominated for the same award the following year, losing to Celine Dion.

The band, renamed Candi & The Backbeat, released the album World Keeps on Turning in 1990. The title track from the album was nominated for the Best Dance Recording at the 1991 Juno Awards.

After promotion of this album, they decided not to continue with the project. Candi ended up marrying her drummer, and currently teaches high school in the Toronto area.

== Discography ==
=== Studio albums ===
- Candi (1988)
- World Keeps on Turning (1990)

=== Singles ===
| Year | Single | Peak positions | | | Album |
| Year | Single | CAN | CAN Dance | US Dance | Album |
|---|---|---|---|---|---|
| 1988 | "Dancing Under a Latin Moon" | 24 | 8 | 46 | Candi |
| 1988 | "Under Your Spell" | 21 | 1 | 39 | Candi |
| 1989 | "Missing You" | 18 | 9 | — | Candi |
| 1989 | "Love Makes No Promises" | 9 | — | — | Candi |
| 1990 | "The World Just Keeps on Turning" | 15 | 7 | — | World Keeps on Turning |
| 1991 | "Friends Forever" | 36 | — | 38 | World Keeps on Turning |
| 1991 | "Good Together" | 31 | 5 | — | World Keeps on Turning |
"—" denotes a single that did not chart or was not released
