= Skywalk (band) =

Skywalk was a Jazz Fusion band based out of Vancouver, British Columbia. The band was formed in 1979 by Graeme Coleman (keyboards) and Rene Worst (bass), with Tom Keenlyside (tenor and soprano saxophones, flute), Ihor Kukurudza (guitar), Jim McGillveray (percussion), and Lou Hoover (drums).

They opened for Oscar Peterson at the 1980 Montreaux/Detroit International Jazz Festival. This performance was recorded and released as their initial album Skywalk Live In Detroit (RCI 520), which received air play on Radio Canada International. This is the only recorded performance of the band with Hoover still playing drums.

By 1980, Kukurudza had been replaced by Harris Van Berkel, and Hoover by Kat Hendrikse. Silent Witness (Skywalk Records 001) was released in 1982 initially on their own label, Skywalk Records, and was picked up and released in the U.S. by Zebra Records in 1983 (ZEB-5680), where it achieved #12 on Billboard's jazz/contemporary charts. Subsequent releases include The Bohemians (ZEB-5715) in 1985, Paradiso (ZEB-42204) in 1987, and Larger Than Life (Mesa/BlueMoon R279173; also on Rhino/WEA) in 1992.
