= Manteca (band) =

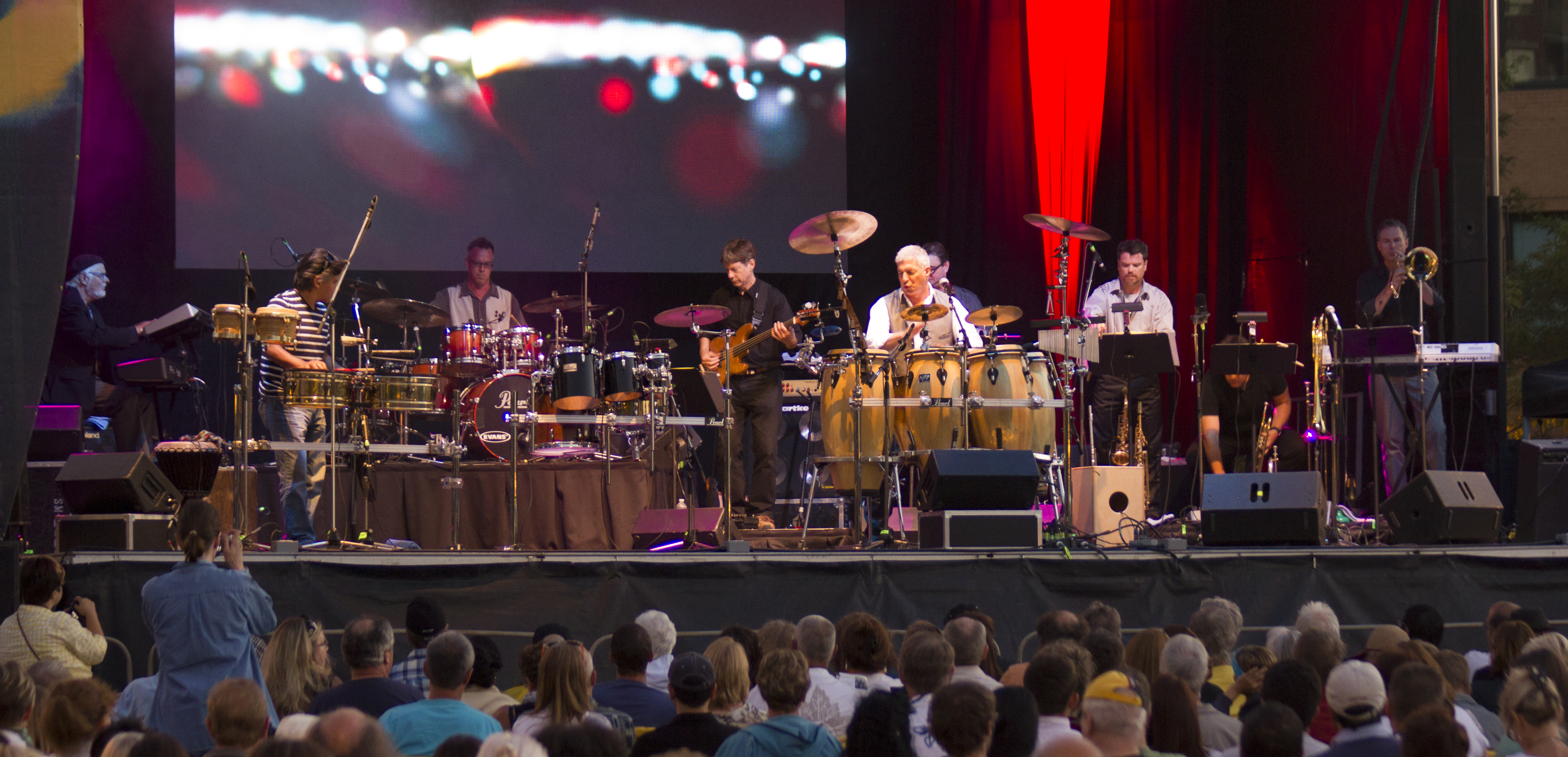
- Manteca performing at a festival in July 2012

Background information
- Genres: Jazz
- Years active: 1979–present
- Members: Matt Zimbel; Henry Heillig
- Website: manteca-music.com

Manteca is a Canadian jazz fusion band that toured during the 1980s and 1990s. It was formed by percussionist Matt Zimbel and bassist Henry Heillig in 1979.

Their repertoire consisted of pieces composed by keyboardist Aaron Davis and Rick Tait, and, after he replaced Davis on keyboards in 1992, Gordon Sheard. In addition to having horn sections and Latin and African percussion, they included synthesizers, creating music in a "pan-fusion" style, essentially jazz improvisation drawing from salsa, samba, funk and tribal influences.

The band began playing in Toronto in 1979, and by 1987 were touring annually in Canada. Their US debut was at the Concord Jazz Festival in 1989, and they played at the North Sea, Pori and Stockholm jazz festivals in 1990.

They received a Juno award in 1989 for Instrumental Artist of the Year.

After a hiatus, Manteca released a new album, Onward in 2007, and resumed touring. Onward included some different instruments, such as EWI (Electronic Wind Instrument) and penny whistle. Guest composers for this album are Gord Sheard and Doug Wilde.

Other members of the band have included keyboardist Aaron Davis, saxophonist John Johnson, Gordon Sheard, Wayne Baker, Herb Koffman, Rick Tait, Steve McDade, Kirk MacDonald, Ralph Bowen, Gary Boigon, Phil Dwyer, Earl Leader, Norman Jones, Art Avalos, Mike Sloski, David James, and Charlie Cooley.

== Discography ==
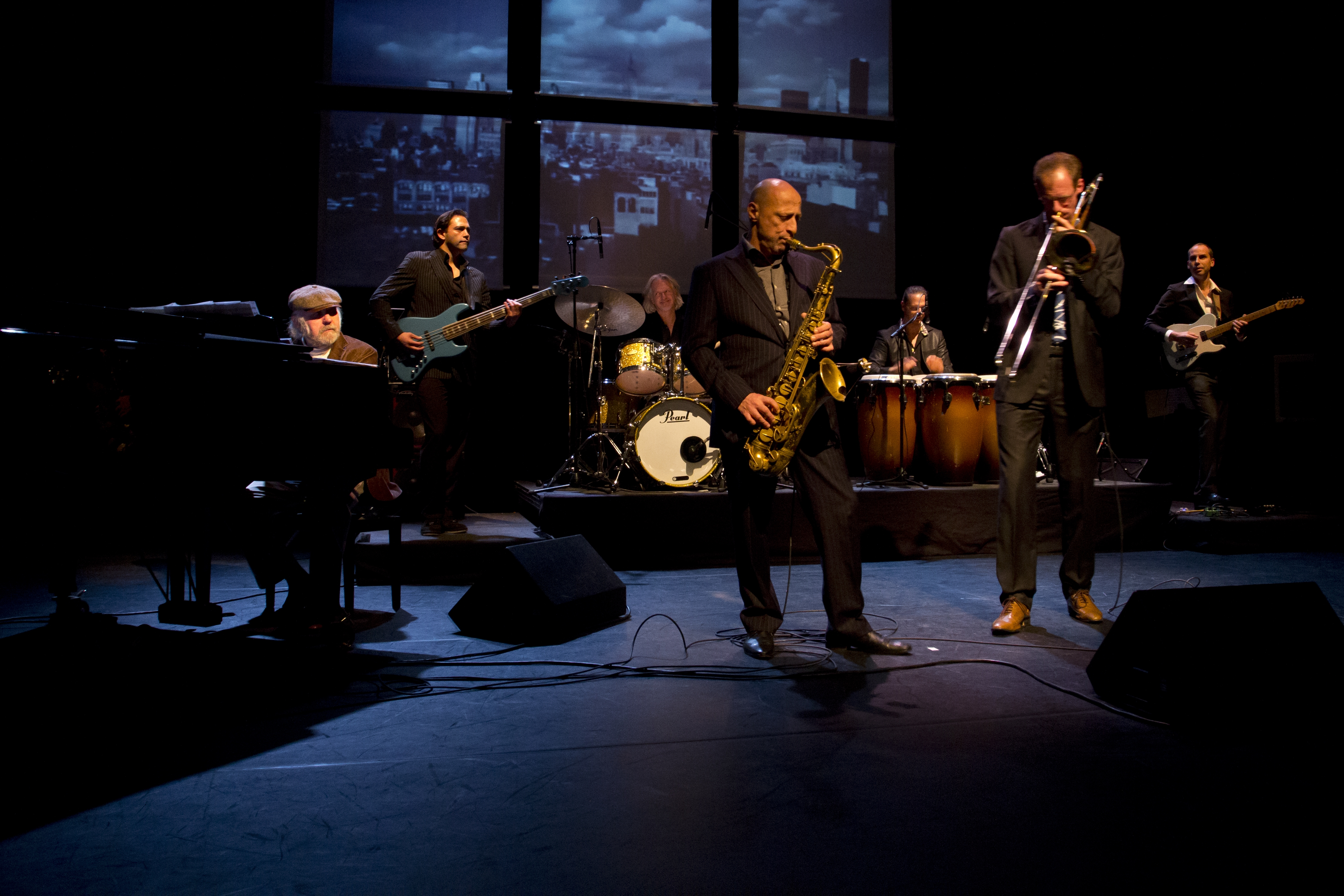
Manteca in 2013.

- 1980 - Manteca
- 1984 - Strength in Numbers
- 1986 - No Heroes
- 1987 - Fire Me Up
- 1989 - Perfect Foot
- 1990 - Extra, Extra
- 1992 - Later is Now!
- 1996 - No Net
- 2007 - Onward
- 2008 - Fun Fun - A Night in Montreal
- 2013 - Monday Night at the Mensa Disco
- 2016 - Twelfth of Never
- 2020 - Augmented Indifference
- 2023 - The Offspring Project
