= Kumbaya Festival =

Former Canadian music and arts festival

- Genre: diverse genres
- Locations: Toronto, Ontario, Canada
- Years active: 1993-1996
- Founders: Molly Johnson
- Website: Kumbaya Foundation

The Kumbaya Festival was an annual Canadian music and arts festival in the 1990s. It was organized by Molly Johnson as a benefit for Canadian charities and groups doing work around HIV and AIDS.

The festival was broadcast live on MuchMusic each year, with the broadcast including a toll-free number which home viewers could call to make additional donations. Compilation CDs of performances from the festival were also subsequently released to raise additional funds. The festival raised over $1 million during its years of activity.

Each annual festival consisted primarily of musical performers, although each also featured numerous writers reading literary pieces, as well as actors, media personalities, HIV/AIDS activists and other Canadian public figures speaking on the importance of the HIV/AIDS issue.

Although the Kumbaya Foundation, the organization which staged the festival, is still active in Canadian and international HIV/AIDS fundraising as of 2014, the festival itself has not been staged since 1996. Johnson has, however, expressed an interest in reviving the festival.

== Performers and speakers ==
The lists of participants can be found at the Kumbaya Foundation website.

=== 1993 ===
- Lee Aaron
- Lillian Allen
- Randy Bachman
- Ralph Benmergui
- Blue Rodeo
- Meryn Cadell
- June Callwood
- Andrew Cash
- Tom Cochrane
- John Cody
- Holly Cole Trio
- Cowboy Junkies
- Crash Vegas
- Devon and the Metro Squad
- Eric Dow
- Shirley Eikhard
- Rik Emmett
- Phillip Ethier
- 54-40
- Joel Feeney
- Marlene Freise
- Peter Gzowski
- Infidels
- Rebecca Jenkins
- Clifton Joseph
- King Cobb Steelie
- Kristy Knight
- Leslie Spit Treeo
- Alex Lifeson
- Lost Dakotas
- Lisa Lougheed
- The Lowest of the Low
- Maureen McCall
- Murray McLauchlan
- Mae Moore
- Moxy Früvous
- Mary Margaret O'Hara
- David Ramsden
- Lorraine Segato
- David Sereda
- Sandra Shamas
- Chris Sheppard and BKS
- Shingoose
- Jane Siberry
- Skydiggers
- Dale Smith
- Tarzan Dan
- Tim Thorney
- The Tragically Hip
- Skot Turner
- Cassandra Vasik
- Joey Vendetta
- The Waltons
- Youth Outreach Mass Choir

=== 1994 ===
- Lee Aaron
- Accidentally Cool
- Lillian Allen
- Jann Arden
- Chantel Aston
- BKS
- Randy Bachman
- Barenaked Ladies
- Micah Barnes
- Jaymz Bee
- Ralph Benmergui
- Barney Bentall
- Moe Berg
- Big Sugar
- Blue Rodeo
- Sara Botsford
- Meryn Cadell
- June Callwood
- Stuart Cameron
- Change of Heart
- Tom Cochrane
- John Cody
- Holly Cole
- Simone Denny
- Devon and the Metro Squad
- Dream Warriors
- Pye Dubois
- Erica Ehm
- Rik Emmett
- 54-40
- Joel Feeney
- Fifth Column
- Andy Frost
- Lawrence Gowan
- Danny Greenspoon
- Peter Gzowski
- hHead
- Tomson Highway
- Rebecca Jenkins
- C. David Johnson
- Kit Johnson
- Taborah Johnson
- Jughead
- Leslie Spit Treeo
- Alex Lifeson
- Lost Dakotas
- Ashley MacIsaac
- Peter Mansbridge
- Shannon Maracle
- Cindy Matthews
- Michelle McAdorey
- Kevin McDonald
- Murray McLauchlan
- Kim Mitchell,
- Moist
- Moxy Früvous
- Billy Newton-Davis
- Mary Margaret O'Hara
- Prairie Oyster
- Punjabi by Nature
- David Ramsden
- The Rankin Family,
- Jimmy Rankin
- Lisa Rendall
- Kathryn Rose
- Lorraine Segato
- Shadowy Men on a Shadowy Planet
- Sandra Shamas
- Jay Sharp
- Jane Siberry
- Kurt Swinghammer
- Chris Tait
- Randy Taylor
- Tim Thorney
- Cassandra Vasik
- Don Waboose
- The Waltons
- The Watchmen
- Vivienne Williams
- Shelley Wright
- Lori Yates

=== 1995 ===
- Armed and Hammered
- Margaret Atwood
- Barenaked Ladies
- Micah Barnes
- Jaymz Bee
- Ralph Benmergui
- Salome Bey
- Bitch Diva
- Blue Rodeo
- The Boomers
- Bootsauce
- Meryn Cadell
- June Callwood
- Change of Heart
- Holly Cole
- Les Colocs
- Crash Vegas
- France D'Amour
- Jennifer Dean
- Dream Warriors
- Shirley Eikhard
- The Fabulous Freaks
- Joel Feeney
- Furnaceface
- Doug Gilmour
- Peter Gzowski
- Jeff Healey
- Orin Isaacs
- Jingle Dancers
- Gordie Johnson
- Clifton Joseph
- Junkhouse
- The Killjoys
- Andy Kim
- George Koller
- Daniel Lanois
- Leslie Spit Treeo
- Alex Lifeson
- Lost Dakotas
- Ashley MacIsaac
- Cindy Matthews
- Maximum Fine
- Sarah McLachlan
- Melleny Melody
- Michie Mee
- Derek Miller
- Moxy Früvous
- Billy Newton-Davis
- No Mans Land
- Odds
- Robert Priest
- Carole Pope
- The Pursuit of Happiness
- The Rainbow Choir
- David Ramsden
- Ellen Reid
- Kathryn Rose
- Lorraine Segato
- Skaface
- Skydiggers
- Slowburn
- Bob Snider
- Spirit of the West
- Ian Thomas
- The Toronto Tabla Ensemble
- Cassandra Vasik
- Wild Strawberries
- Vivienne Williams
- Lori Yates

=== 1996 ===
- Angel
- Jann Arden
- Erin Benjamin
- Barney Bentall
- Barstool Prophets
- Bass Is Base
- Beautiful Joe
- Blackie and the Rodeo Kings
- Captain Tractor
- Tom Cochrane
- Bruce Cockburn
- Jim Cuddy
- Devon Martin
- Annette Ducharme
- Duotang
- Earthtones
- Joel Feeney
- Danielle French
- Lennie Gallant
- Jeff Healey
- Hunnytruck
- Marc Jordan
- Junkhouse
- Leslie Spit Treeo
- Kevin McDonald
- Murray McLauchlan
- Merlin
- Pamela Morgan
- The Paperboys
- Punchbuggy
- Jimmy Rankin
- Salmonblaster
- Sianspheric
- Amy Sky
- Kinnie Starr
- Kim Stockwood
- Sunfish
- The Super Friendz
- Tariq
- Leslie Taylor
- Tristan Psionic
- Umoja
- Universal Honey
- Keith Nakonechny & Jason Plumb of The Waltons
- Wild Strawberries
- Tom Wilson
