= Up to You (EP) =

EP by Blue Peter
- Released: 1982
- Genre: New wave
- Label: Ready Records ER025
- Producer: Kevin Doyle, Chris Wardman

Blue Peter chronology
Radio Silence (1980)	Up to You (1982)	Falling (1983)

Up to You was an EP by the Toronto-based new wave band Blue Peter. Released in 1982, it included the single "Chinese Graffiti", which garnered the band their biggest radio exposure to date, winning a CASBY Award (then known as the "U-Knows") for Single of the Year. In the past, "Chinese Graffiti" had been released as a single by the band on their own short-lived independent record label, AWOL Records, in 1981. The EP ranked 29th on CFNY's Top 82 Albums of 1982, and its success led to the following year's album, Falling being produced by Steve Nye.

== Personnel ==
Blue Peter:

- Mike Bambrick - drums
- Paul Humphrey - vocals
- Ric Joudrey - bass
- Chris Wardman - guitars

Additional personnel:

- Malcolm Burn - keyboards on "Chinese Graffiti"
- Sherry Kean (credited as "Sherry Huffman") - backing vocals on "Chinese Graffiti"
- Glenn Gould, whose recordings had been produced by Blue Peter producer Kevin Doyle, was credited as having sourced the orchestral sample used on "Guilty Secret".

== Track listing ==
All songs on the album were written by Chris Wardman:
Side A
1. "Up to You" - 2:57
2. "Chinese Graffiti" - 3:39
3. "Guilty Secret" - 3:48
Side B
4. "Around You" - 3:49
5. "The World Stops Here" - 3:26
6. "Up to U" (instrumental) - 3:22

== Re-issue ==
In 2007, Up to You was re-issued by Universal Music Canada on compact disc, combined with Version, a 1983 EP of remixes from Falling, and other previously unreleased bonus tracks and demos, as Burning Bridges.
