= Falling (Blue Peter album) =

Studio album by Blue Peter
- Released: 1983
- Genre: New wave
- Length: 42:05
- Label: Ready Records LR034
- Producer: Steve Nye

Blue Peter chronology
Up to You (1982)	Falling (1983)

Falling was the second full-length album by the Toronto-based new wave band Blue Peter. Coming on the heels of Up To You, their successful 1982 EP, Steve Nye was selected to produce their next album, which included the hit song, "Don't Walk Past". Nye's production emphasized keyboards over guitars, and drew comparisons with his work with Roxy Music and Japan.

== Reception ==
Professional ratings
Review scores
Source	Rating
Allmusic	4.5/5 stars

Released in the spring of 1983 on Ready Records, Falling peaked nationally at 64 (where it stayed for three weeks) on the Canadian Albums Chart, and was ranked 25th on Toronto radio station CFNY's Top 83 of 1983 chart. The biggest single from Falling was "Don't Walk Past", known for its jangly guitar riff, and CFNY ranked the song at 92 in its Best 102 of the Decade in January 1990. The video for "Don't Walk Past", directed by Rob Quartly, was inspired by the then-recent film Blade Runner and became the first from a Canadian indie label to get played on MTV in the United States. The video also won awards including "Best Video of 1983" from the Canadian Film and Television Association, and was ranked at 85 on MuchMusic's Top Videos of The Century list.

== Personnel ==
Blue Peter:

- Paul Humphrey - vocals
- Ric Joudrey - bass
- Jason Sniderman - keyboards, percussion, programming
- Owen Tennyson - drums
- Chris Wardman - guitars, keyboards, programming

Additional personnel:

- Leslie Howitt - backing vocals on "Don't Walk Past"
- Matt Zimball - congas on "Unchained Heart"

== Track listing ==
All songs written by Chris Wardman, except where noted:

Side 1:
1. "Falling" (4:30)
2. "Don't Walk Past" (4:27)
3. "Red Filters" (4:05)
4. "All Your Time" (4:32)
5. "Unchained Heart" (4:00) (Sniderman)

Side 2:
6. "Head Over Heels" (3:57)
7. "Pendulum" (4:02)
8. "Burning Bridges" (3:55)
9. "Right Stuff" (3:55) (Wardman, Joudrey and Kevin Doyle)
10. "Newsreel" (4:42)

== Re-issue ==
In 2007, Falling was re-issued by Universal Music Canada, combined with Vertigo, a collection of previously unreleased material. The additional eight songs were recorded as demos in 1984, and, in some cases, completed with additional parts added in 1996 by Humphrey and Joudrey. The Vertigo tracks were produced by Blue Peter and Kevin Doyle. Songs were written by Chris Wardman, except where noted:

Additional tracks
11. "Water Off the Moon" (4:54)
12. "Night Duty" (4:33) (Wardman, Sniderman)
13. "Throw It Down" (4:33)
14. "Lap of Luxury" (4:45)
15. "Equalizer" (4:26) (Wardman, Sniderman)
16. "Vertigo" (4:35)
17. "Steal Away" (3:33) (Wardman, Sniderman)
18. "Into the Parade" (4:45) (Wardman, Sniderman)
