= Radio Silence (Blue Peter album) =

Studio album by Blue Peter
- Released: 1980
- Genre: New wave
- Label: Ready Records RR009
- Producer: Jasper, Blue Peter

Blue Peter chronology
Test Patterns for Living (7") (1979)	Radio Silence (1980)	Up to You (7") (1982)

Professional ratings
Review scores
Source	Rating
Allmusic	4/5 stars

Radio Silence is the first full-length album by the Toronto-based new wave band Blue Peter. Released in 1980, it contained the moderately successful single "Video Verite", as well as the eponymous single "Radio Silence", known for its simple "dying keyboard" riff. The album ranked 60th in CFNY's Top 80 Albums of 1980.

The original LP release credits production to Jasper and Blue Peter. The CD issue from 2007 credits the producers as Kevin Doyle, Chris Wardman and Jasper.

== Personnel ==
- Mike Bambrick - drums
- Paul Humphrey - vocals, keyboards
- Geoff McOuat - bass
- Chris Wardman - guitar

Additional personnel:

- Ray Parker - piano on Take Me to War

== Track listing ==
All songs on the album were written by Chris Wardman, except where noted:

1. "Video Verite" - 3:54
2. "Where's My Angel" - 3:24 (Humphrey)
3. "Attraction" - 2:57
4. "Hesitate" - 3:36
5. "Shellshocked" - 4:01
6. "Radio Silence" - 4:31
7. "Neon Girls" - 3:43
8. "A.W.O.L." - 3:16
9. "I Walk Alone" - 3:48
10. "Take Me to War" - 5:18

== Re-issue ==
In 2007, Radio Silence was re-issued by Universal Music Canada on compact disc, combined with Test Patterns for Living (originally released as a seven-inch by Ready Records in 1979). In addition, the re-issue also includes two bonus tracks, a single edit of "Video Verite" and a live concert recording of 'Take Me to War", recorded in 1983 in Montreal.

The band lineup for the Test Patterns for Living tracks included Paul Humphrey on vocals and keyboards, Chris Wardman on guitar, Geoff McOuat on bass, and Ron Tomlinson on drums. The band lineup for the live version of Take Me to War was the final incarnation of Blue Peter, featuring Humphrey, Wardman, Jason Sniderman on keyboards, Ric Joudrey on bass and Owen Tennyson on drums.
