= Test Patterns for Living =

Test Patterns For Living

EP by Blue Peter
- Released: 1979
- Genre: New wave
- Label: Ready Records RR005
- Producer: Angus MacKay, Andrew Crosby

Blue Peter chronology
Test Patterns For Living (1979)	Radio Silence (1980)

Test Patterns for Living was the first release, an EP, by the Toronto-based new wave band Blue Peter. Released in 1979, it included the single "Factory Living", which helped the band get their first radio airplay on CFNY. The song "Same Old Place", later appeared on the compilation album, The Best of Ready Volume 1 :: 20th Century Masters – The Millennium Collection, and in 2009 was included on the soundtrack for the vampire/rock and roll movie Suck; the latter event led to Blue Peter performing in 2009 at the Toronto International Film Festival at Yonge-Dundas Square (now Sankofa Square) in Toronto, for the film's premiere.

== Personnel ==
- Paul Humphrey – vocals, keyboards
- Geoff McOuat – bass
- Ron Tomlinson – drums
- Chris Wardman – guitar

== Track listing ==
All songs on the album were written by Chris Wardman, unless otherwise noted:

Side A

1. "Same Old Place" – 3:08
2. "Out with the Boys" – 3:03 (Humphrey)
3. "Living in the Eighties" – 2:17
4. "Time and Money" – 2:10

Side B

1. "Do the Robot" – 3:29
2. "Cloak and Dagger" – 3:45
3. "Factory Living" – 2:48

== Re-issue ==
In 2007, Test Patterns for Living was re-issued by Universal Music Canada on compact disc, combined with Radio Silence, Blue Peter's first full-length album, from 1980. Test Patterns for Living appeared as bonus tracks on the Radio Silence re-issue in the same order as on the original release.
