= Poetreason: The Songs of Bob Snider =

Compilation album by Various Artists
- Released: 1996
- Recorded: 1994
- Genre: Folk
- Producer: Bob Snider

Various Artists chronology
Caterwaul & Doggerel (1995)	Poetreason: The Songs of Bob Snider (1996)	Words and Pictures (1997)

Poetreason: The Songs of Bob Snider is an album released in 1996, featuring various Canadian artists performing the songs of Bob Snider. The album was recorded at a live tribute concert to Snider in 1994.

== Track listing ==
1. Bob Snider, "Talk To Me Babe"
2. Jughead, "Arch Support Blues"
3. The Corndogs, "Sittin' in the Kitchen"
4. Johnny Trash, "Dark Corners"
5. Scott Dibble and Watertown, "(I'm Looking For) A Love to Call My Own"
6. Kyp Harness, "Sitting in a Doorway"
7. Kevin McDonald and Dave Foley, "Give Me A C"
8. U.I.C., "I'm a Cowboy Now"
9. Kevin McDonald, "Song for Bob Snider"
10. Lost Dakotas, "You"
11. Leslie Spit Treeo, "Ancient Eyes"
12. Scott B. Sympathy, "Song for Cupid"
13. Moxy Früvous, "Ash Hash"
14. Dave Bookman, "Parkette"
15. Meryn Cadell and Veda Hille, "Blues I Get"
16. Groovy Religion, "Old Nova Scotian"
17. Change of Heart, "Coffee Break Blues"
18. Al Miller Band, "Anna Marie"
19. Bob Snider, "Only Crazy People"
20. hHead, "They Oughtta Bottle Friday Night"
