= Breeding Ground =

Canadian alternative rock band

- Jonathan Strayer (bass, left) and John Shirreff (vocals, right)

Background information
- Origin: Toronto, Ontario, Canada
- Genres: Alternative rock, post-punk
- Years active: 1981–1990
- Labels: Mannequin Records, Fringe Product
- Members: John Shirreff (vocals); Hugh Gladish (guitar, keys); Jonathan Strayer (bass guitar)
- Past members: Ken Jones (drummer); Jonathan Davies (drummer, production); Kevin Hunter (drummer); Gary Quinn (bass guitar, slide guitar); Chris Wardman (additional guitars, production); Molly Johnson (guest vocals, live shows); Jason Sniderman (piano); Tad Winklarz (saxophone)

Breeding Ground were a Canadian alternative rock band in the 1980s, based out of Toronto, Ontario, Canada. Lead singer John Shirreff and guitarist Hugh Gladish were the only consistent members of the band, and they founded the group in 1981 with original bassist Jonathan Strayer.

== History ==
=== Formation ===
Breeding Ground played over 40 shows on the Queen Street West circuit before they released their first eponymous debut EP, Breeding Ground, on Mannequin Records, recorded at Montclair Sound in November 1982, a 4-song self titled EP. This was produced by Paul Tozer, their live audio technician, who worked with them on their first two EPs.

Within a month of its release they were asked to open up for Bauhaus on December 4, 1982, at Larry's Hideaway in Toronto. Comparisons to Joy Division and the British cold-wave invasion were quick to surface after this release. They were managed by longtime friend David Hart (who also masterminded and operated the stage lighting) during this era. Breeding Ground also played at Lee's Palace in Toronto in 1986.

The 12" EP "Reunion/Slaughter" [1983] was their second 12" single. Jonathan Davies, the drummer for local band Kinetic Ideals, expressed an interest in assisting with production, and 3 months before the release replaced Jones in the live line-up. This EP was recorded at Quest Studio, Oshawa, and released in October 1983. "Reunion/Slaughter" was playlisted on Toronto radio station CFNY.

Davies was later replaced by Kevin Hunter, who would stay with the band until their break-up in 1990. Late in 1986, Strayer left and the rest of the band put things on hold.

=== Studio albums ===
Three years after releasing "Reunion/Slaughter", the band returned to the studio in the late winter of 1985 to record their third release, with label Fringe Product. This album, Tales of Adventure, was released April 25, 1986, and spawned the hits "This Time Tomorrow" and "Happy Now I Know" featuring Molly Johnson. Videos were produced for these songs, both directed and produced by Jonathan Strayer's younger brother Colin Strayer; the video for "This Time Tomorrow" was shot on January 28, 1986. However, a year later, bassist Strayer had left, leading to a brief hiatus in which they disbanded, until reforming with Gary Quinn on bass leading to the follow-up recording, Obscurity & Flair. Chris Wardman joined soon after the release of Obscurity & Flair as an additional guitarist. Gary Quinn wrote the lyrics for, and played slide guitar on the track "Live Like Fear".

=== Local and national success ===
They were invited to open for touring acts such as The Stranglers at The Concert Hall in April 1983 and Echo and the Bunnymen as well as Let's Active on the Ontario portion of their tour in March 1984.

With the release of Tales of Adventure the band started to receive even more national radio airplay, and the two music videos were getting regular rotation on Canadian television music channel MuchMusic. Breeding Ground made it to the number one spot on the college and university music charts, a first for an independent Canadian act. In 1989, four years after releasing Tales of Adventure, the band went to the studio for the last time, with the line-up of Shirreff, Gladish, Quinn and Hunter, with a mixture of song-writing including Chris Wardman, before he officially joined the live line-up. Obscurity & Flair produced the hit "Ceremony of Love", once again featuring Johnson. A third video was shot for this song, produced by Mark Mowad, but received minimal exposure on MuchMusic because it was so dark, literally. Keyboardist Tad Winklarz from Chalk Circle added saxophone on the track "Bells Descend".

Gladish and Shirreff made a decision to end the second phase of the band in March 1990.

== Discography ==
In nine years of existence, Breeding Ground released 2 LPs, 2 EPs, one greatest-hits CD and 3 music videos.

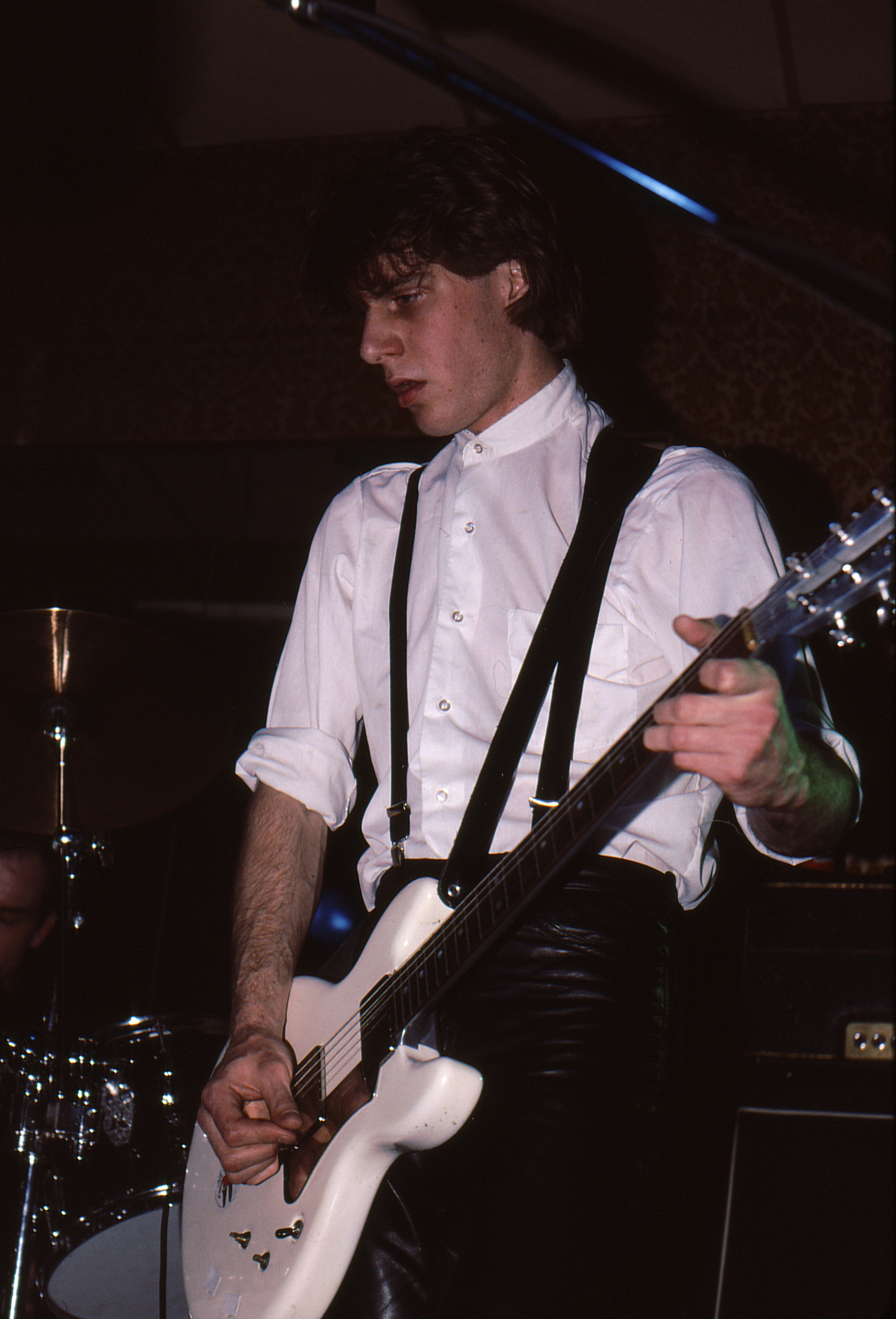
Hugh Gladish (guitars) on April 25th, 1982

Obscurity & Flair, second LP

Release date	Title	Label	Notes
1982	Breeding Ground 12" EP	Mannequin Records	Eponymous debut; helps put their name on the map and gets them more shows at clubs around town. Features original drummer Ken Jones. Got some college radio airplay.
1983	Reunion/Slaughter 12" EP	Fringe Product	Single release for upcoming album Tales of Adventure; this EP was included in the second pressing of Tales of Adventure. Assistant production by Jonathan Davies, who replaced Ken Jones in 1983.
1986	Tales of Adventure	Fringe Product	First full-length album. Was generally well-received and cemented their place in the Toronto club scene. Produced by Chris Wardman of another local Toronto band, Blue Peter. Molly Johnson sang on the record—with her help, the record made it onto spot No. 60 CFNY Radio's best 86 Albums of 1986. Epic Epic (from Tales of Adventure)
1989	Obscurity & Flair	Fringe Product	Second full-length album, and the first to feature Gary Quinn on bass and slide guitar.
1994	Revisited	Fringe Product	Greatest-hits CD. Was released post-breakup. This Time Tomorrow This Time Tomorrow (from Revisited)
