= Hell's Kitchen (Leslie Spit Treeo album) =

Studio album by Leslie Spit Treeo
- Released: 1994
- Producer: Joe Hardy

Leslie Spit Treeo chronology
Book of Rejection (1992)	Hell's Kitchen (1994)	Chocolate Chip Cookies (album) (1996)

Hell's Kitchen was the third album by Canadian folk rock group Leslie Spit Treeo, released in 1994.

With original member Jack Nicholsen having left the group after 1992's Book of Rejection, the band now consisted of the duo of Laura Hubert and Pat Langner. Accordingly, since the band were no longer a "treeo", the album's original release was credited to The Spits, although the album was subsequently reissued under the band's original name.

Nicholsen did, however, appear on one album track, the lead single "Dirt on Me", as a guest musician. Other guests included Jason Sniderman, John Alcorn, Lori Yates, David Ramsden and Cindy Matthews, who later married Nicholsen.

The song "Since We Danced Outside" was written for the film Dance Me Outside, in which the band appeared performing the song in concert.

The album was produced by Joe Hardy.

== Track listing ==
All songs written by Hubert/Langner, except "Juke Box Lady" by Tomson Highway.

1. Tag
2. Just Want the Proof
3. Give You Gave
4. Dirt on Me
5. Since We Danced Outside (dedicated in liner notes as "for Harry Tucker")
6. Runaway Whoop Dee Doo (dedicated in liner notes as "in memory of Kurt and all the others")
7. Always Get What I Want
8. Moment of the River
9. Apathy
10. Big Guns
11. Juke Box Lady
12. You Don't Have to Mention It Again
13. On Our Own Tonight
14. Holdin' on Today
15. Tag Finale
