= Fluke (album) =

Studio album by Rusty
- Released: July 11, 1995
- Recorded: Presence Studio
- Genre: Alternative rock, post-grunge, punk rock
- Length: 37:00
- Label: Handsome Boy, BMG Music
- Producer: Chris Wardman

Rusty chronology
Wake Me (1994)	Fluke (1995)	Sophomoric (1997)

Singles from Fluke
- 1. "Wake Me" Released: 1995; 2. "Groovy Dead" Released: 1995; 3. "Misogyny" Released: 1995; 4. "California" Released: 1996

Fluke is the debut full-length studio album by Canadian alternative rock band Rusty, released in 1995. The album features the singles "Wake Me", "Groovy Dead", "Misogyny", and "California".

== Overview ==
Fluke was recorded in five days at Presence Studio in Toronto. The album was produced by Chris Wardman, who also played acoustic guitar on the tracks "Groovy Dead" and "California". Drums on the tracks "Punk", "Wake Me", "KD Lang", "Misogyny", and "Billy Boy" were credited to the band's original drummer Bob Vespaziani. His replacement, Mitch Perkins, played drums on the remainder of the tracks.

== Award nominations ==
Fluke was nominated for "Favourite New Release" at the 1995 CASBY Awards. It was nominated for "Best Alternative Album" at the 1996 Juno Awards.

== In popular culture ==
- The song "Misogyny" was featured in the 1996 films Hustler White and The Boys Club.
- The song "Punk" was included on the soundtrack to the 1996 comedy film Black Sheep. The song is featured in the film during the scene in which David Spade and Chris Farley's characters headbang to the song in their car.
- The song "Wake Me" was featured in the 1996 film Joe's So Mean to Josephine.

== Track listing ==
All tracks written by Scott McCullough, Ken MacNeil, Jim Moore, and Mitch Perkins.

1. "Groovy Dead" - 3:43
2. "Punk" - 1:54
3. "Wake Me" - 4:09
4. "Warning" - 3:38
5. "KD Lang" - 3:16
6. "California" - 4:26
7. "Misogyny" - 5:36
8. "Billy Boy" - 3:56
9. "Tar Water" - 1:47
10. "Ceiling" - 4:31
