= This Mourning =

Single by Chalk Circle

from the album Mending Wall
- Released: 1987
- Recorded: 1986–1987
- Genre: Rock
- Length: 3:33
- Label: Duke Street
- Songwriter(s): Chalk Circle, Chris Tait
- Producer(s): Chris Wardman

Chalk Circle singles chronology
"Me, Myself and I" (1986)	"This Mourning" (1987)	"20th Century Boy" (1987)

"This Mourning" is the lead single from Canadian band Chalk Circle's first full-length album, Mending Wall. It was released on Duke Street Records in 1987.

The song itself deals with the nuclear threat of annihilation that was very much part of everyday life in the 1980s.

The 12" features two non-album b-sides that were later re-released on the CD issue of The Great Lake EP in 1988.

== Track listings ==
=== 7": Duke Street (Canada) ===
1. "This Mourning"
2. "Village"

=== 12": Duke Street (Canada) ===
1. "This Mourning" (Extended Mix)
2. "Come with Me"
3. "Believe in Something"
- The two B-sides were also included on the re-release of The Great Lake.
