= The Apostate (album) =

Studio album by Art Bergmann
- Released: 2016
- Genre: Alternative rock
- Label: Weewerk
- Producer: Lorrie Matheson

Art Bergmann chronology
Songs for the Underclass (2014)	The Apostate (2016)	Remember Her Name (2017)

The Apostate is the eighth studio album by Art Bergmann, released in 2016 on weewerk records. It is his first new full-length album since 1998's Design Flaw. The digital release date was April 8, 2016 and the CD / LP release date was May 13, 2016.

The album was funded in part by a crowdfunding campaign on PledgeMusic. Musician Craig Northey also publicized the campaign by releasing a cover of Bergmann's 1991 single "Faithlessly Yours".

== Track listing ==
No.	Title	Length
1.	"Atheist Prayer"	5:19
2.	"Mirage (The Apostate)"	4:57
3.	"Cassandra"	5:15
4.	"The Greatest Story Never Told"	5:46
5.	"Live It Up"	4:02
6.	"A Town Called Mean"	4:09
7.	"Pioneers"	9:31
8.	"The Legend of Bobby Bird"	4:52

== Personnel ==
- Art Bergmann – electric and acoustic guitars, vocals
- Paul Rigby – steel, acoustic, baritone and electric guitars, mandolin, e-bow
- Lorrie Matheson – acoustic and electric guitars, mellotron, organ, pianorgan, chopsticks
- Jason Sniderman – piano, wurlitzer, mellotron
- Ian Grant – drums, percussion
- Peter Clarke – bass
- Foon Yap – violin
- Mike Little – accordion
- Natasha Sayer – vocals
- Emily Triggs – vocals
- Nikki Valentine – vocals
