= What Fresh Hell Is This? =

What Fresh Hell is This?

Studio album by Art Bergmann
- Released: 1995
- Genre: Alternative rock
- Label: Epic
- Producer: Chris Wardman

Art Bergmann chronology
Art Bergmann (1991)	What Fresh Hell is This? (1995)	Design Flaw (1998)

What Fresh Hell is This? is the fourth studio album by Art Bergmann, released in 1995 on Epic Records. The album gets its name from a quotation by American wit Dorothy Parker.

The album was written primarily while Bergmann was in rehab, recovering from his prior battles with drug addiction.

In its year end poll of its newspapers' music critics, Southam Newspapers named the album as one of the ten best albums of 1995, with London Free Press critic Ian Gillespie lauding Bergmann as "a Canadian rock genius, doomed to hover around the edges of commercial obscurity", and Calgary Herald critic James Muretich calling the album "more tortured, timeless tunes of sex, drugs and rock 'n' roll by Canada's subculture answer to Ray Davies, Leonard Cohen and Paul Westerberg".

It won the Juno Award for Best Alternative Album in 1996. Bergmann followed up with Design Flaw, an album of rerecorded versions of songs from his earlier albums, in 1998, but did not record another full-length album of new material until The Apostate in 2016.

== Track listing ==
No.	Title	Length
1.	"Beatles in Hollywood"	5:33
2.	"Another Train Song"	3:33
3.	"In Betweens"	2:22
4.	"Buried Alive"	4:43
5.	"Guns and Heroin"	4:37
6.	"Some Fresh Hell"	4:27
7.	"Contract"	4:31
8.	"Jones"	3:36
9.	"Demolished"	3:48
10.	"Nearer My God to Thee"	5:28
11.	"Dive"	4:11
12.	"Stop the Time"	5:00
