= The Great Lake =

EP by Chalk Circle
- Released: 1986
- Recorded: Winter 1985 – Spring 1986
- Studio: Manta Sound, Toronto & Quest Recording Studio, Oshawa, Ontario
- Genre: Rock
- Label: Duke Street
- Producer: Chris Wardman

Chalk Circle chronology
The Great Lake (1986)	Mending Wall (1987)

Professional ratings
Review scores
Source	Rating
Allmusic	3/5 stars

The Great Lake is the debut EP by Chalk Circle released in 1986. The original release of the EP only featured six tracks. It was later re-released with three additional tracks on CD.

The EP contained two singles: "April Fool", a Top 10 hit in Canada, with its U2-like guitar chords, and "Me, Myself and I" also a Top 10 Canadian hit.

The EP's back photo (and the CD's front) was taken along Lake Shore Boulevard in Toronto on the shores of Lake Ontario, which is presumably also the subject of the album's title.

Chalk Circle was nominated for "Most Promising Group of the Year" at the 1986 Juno Awards.

== Track listing ==
All lyrics written by Chris Tait and music by Chalk Circle, except as noted.

=== EP: Duke Street / DSRD-41024 (Canada) ===
1. "April Fool" (Lyrics – D. Murphy) – 5:19
2. "Trains" – 5:05
3. "Big White Clouds" – 4:06
4. "Me, Myself and I" – 4:08
5. "The Great Lake" – 4:09
6. "Superman (Meets the Man of Steel)" – 5:16

=== CD: Duke Street / DSMD-41024 (Canada) ===
1. "April Fool" (Lyrics – D. Murphy) – 5:19
2. "Trains" – 5:05
3. "Big White Clouds" – 4:06
4. "Me, Myself and I" – 4:08
5. "The Great Lake" – 4:09
6. "Superman (Meets the Man of Steel)" – 5:16
7. "20th Century Boy" (Marc Bolan) – 3:42 *
8. "Come with Me" – 3:54 *
9. "Believe in Something" – 3:45 *
- 1988 CD reissue with three bonus tracks (tracks 8 and 9 feature as b-sides on "This Mourning" 12")

== Singles ==
- "April Fool"
- "Me, Myself and I"

== Album credits ==
=== Personnel ===
Chalk Circle:

- Chris Tait – vocals, guitars
- Brad Hopkins – bass guitars
- Derrick Murphy – drums
- Tad Winklarz – keyboards, saxophone

Other:

- Chris Wardman – wobbly guitar, acoustic guitar on "Superman", "Me, Myself and I"
- Jason Sniderman – keyboard programming on "20th Century Boy"
- Kenny MacLean – backing vocals on "20th Century Boy"
- Don Garbutt – computer programming on "20th Century Boy"
- Brian Leonard – tambourine on "Believe in Something"

=== Production ===
- Chris Wardman – producer, arranger
- Ron Searles – engineer
- Paul Lachapelle – engineer
- Aubrey Winfield – engineer, mixer on "Come with Me"
- Howie Weinberg – mastering as Masterdisk, New York City
