= Book of Rejection =

Studio album by Leslie Spit Treeo
- Released: 1992
- Recorded: 1991–1992
- Studios: Manta Eastern Sound Studios (basic tracks), Winfield Sound Rock 'n' Remote (overdubs)
- Genre: Folk rock
- Label: Capitol-EMI
- Producer: Chris Wardman

Book of Rejection is the second album by Canadian folk rock group Leslie Spit Treeo, released in 1992 on Capitol-EMI Canada.

The album's two main singles were "In Your Eyes" and "People Say". "In Your Eyes", the band's biggest hit, reached the Top 20 on the Canadian charts in the fall of 1992.

Guest musicians on the album included Jason Sniderman, Randy Bachman and the album's producer, Chris Wardman.

== Track listing ==
- All songs by Laura Hubert, Pat Langner and Jack Nicholson. Copyright Tag Tunes (Socan)
1. Angry Lifetime (4:24)
2. Too Easy Now (2:31)
3. Happy (3:57)
4. River Through My Fire (3:35)
5. In Your Eyes (3:22)
6. Book of Rejection (5:23)
7. Be a Clown (4:46)
8. What If (3:34)
9. People Say (4:01)
10. Sometimes I Wish (3:04)
11. Redirected (4:20)
12. She's a Slut (3:46)
13. Little Dog (2:56)
14. Falling Star (3:16)

== Personnel ==
=== The Leslie Spit Treeo ===
- Laura Hubert: Vocals, acoustic guitars
- Pat Langner: Vocals, "ugly" electric guitars and solos, sitar
- Jack Nicholson: Acoustic and electric guitars, dobro, mandolin, vocals
- Frank Randazzo: Bass
- Joel Anderson: Drums, percussion
