= Lori Yates =

- Origin: Oshawa, Ontario, Canada
- Genres: Alternative country, cowpunk
- Occupations: singer, songwriter
- Years active: 1986–present
- Labels: Columbia Nashville, Virgin Canada
- Website: https://loriyates.ca

Lori Yates is a Canadian alternative country music singer and songwriter.

== Biography ==
=== Early career ===
Lori Yates, was born in Oshawa, Ontario. Yates began her early music career performing with several Toronto-area bands, including Senseless, The Last Resorts, and Rang Tango. Drawing on her country-punk roots from Toronto’s Queen Street scene in the early 1980s, she fronted these groups before releasing her major label debut, Can’t Stop the Girl (Sony Nashville, 1988).

Senseless

Lori was a founding member of Senseless, 1978. She was discovered by Louis Yachnin, bass player for the Canadian rock band Lighthouse. "Senseless, became regular performers at the Woodbridge Hotel and Miss Edgar's Muddy Water Hotel, where they played Blondie covers" for local audiences.

Tensions arose when the guitarist reportedly declared, “Chicks don’t belong in rock,” during rehearsals. After struggling with the band’s volume and direction, Lori left the group but continued to pursue her musical career independently.

The Last Resorts

In 1981, Yates fronted The Last Resorts, a "punk/new wave band." They regularly played "Toronto punk clubs: Larry's Hideaway & the Turning Point."

Rang Tango

In 1987, Yates formed the band Rang Tango and independently recorded a 12 inch vinyl promotional disk. Sweetheart Avenue - Side A, Red Roses - Side B. The group "were considered pioneers of alternative country/cowpunk in Canada."

Yates was influenced by varied artists including Dolly Parton, Tanya Tucker, and Pink Floyd.

=== Nashville - Can’t Stop the Girl ===
Yates became a Nashville-based artist on the Columbia Records Nashville label. Her debut album Can't Stop the Girl was released worldwide in 1989. She was nominated for a Juno Award in 1990 as Best Female Country Vocalist, and was also nominated for a CCMA Award. She toured with such artists as Big Sugar, Steve Earle, The Nitty Gritty Dirt Band and Dwight Yoakam. Co-writers during this time included Guy Clark, Don Schlitz and Matraca Berg. Although she found some creative satisfaction as a songwriter Lori often felt out of place in Nashville’s music scene. Can’t Stop the Girl was produced by Grammy-winning producer Steve Buckingham, with whom she enjoyed working. The album had chart success with the singles “Scene of the Crime” and “Promises, Promises,” which both reached the Top 70 on Billboard’s Country Singles chart.

Yates recorded the duet "Brother To Brother" with Gregg Allman for his album No Stranger to the Dark: The Best of Gregg Allman and on the soundtrack to the Patrick Swayze film Next of Kin.

Breaking Point

She later signed with Virgin Music Canada and released her second album Breaking Point in 1994, a collection of roots, rock and soul. Rick Danko (The Band) and Jim Cuddy (Blue Rodeo) appeared as guest vocalists. Rick Danko (...described Lori Yates as having “that desperate Canadian sound“). She later toured with Blue Rodeo, Jann Arden, Colin James and Faith Hill. "Breaking Point showcased her stylistic versatility and deserved a better commercial fate."

During this time period, she also contributed vocals to numerous songs for the gothic-oriented sci-fi television show Forever Knight, eight of which later appeared on the series' two soundtrack volumes.

=== Untogether ===
In 1996, Yates released her second Virgin Music Canada album Untogether, a complete musical departure into melodic trip-hop with Toronto's Opium Concepts. The album was recorded at Metalworks Studios in Mississauga, Ontario.

Hey Stella!

In 1998, Yates founded the super group Hey Stella! with long-time collaborators Bazil Donovan of Blue Rodeo, guitarist David Baxter, and drummer Michelle Josef. They released their self titled album, Hey Stella! in 1999. The group became known for their regular Thursday-night performances at the Toronto venue Bar Code. The band developed a reputation for their powerful and unconventional approach to traditional country music, blending humour, emotional depth, and stellar musicianship in both their original material and covers. Their performances often concluded with Yates going out into the audience without a mic belting out Leonard Cohen’s song “So Long, Marianne” while everyone in the club sang along with her. In 2000, Hey Stella! was voted Best Local Band in Toronto's Now magazine readers’ poll.

The Book of Minerva

Yates moved to Hamilton, Ontario, with her family in 2002, where she played with late Brian Griffith, (Daniel Lanois, Emmylou Harris, Willie Nelson), Mike Eastman (Ronnie Hawkins), Jack Pedler (Teenage Head) and many notable Hamilton musicians.

In 2007, Yates produced the album The Book of Minerva with artists such as Bazil Donovan, Justin Rutledge and Tom Wilson.

She won "Songwriter of the Year" and Alternative Country Recording of the Year" at the 2007 Hamilton Music Awards on 18 November 2007.

Sweetheart of the Valley

Sweetheart of the Valley is Lori's seventh studio album. Released late October 2015, it received critical acclaim as Yates' best work yet. Recorded at Knob & Tube Toronto, QED Media and This Ain't Hollywood, Hamilton, she enlisted Hey Stella! (David Baxter, Bazil Donovan, Michelle Josef) as the recording band. Additional musicians include Steve Wood (pedal steel) and Stephen Miller (guitar). Rita Chiarelli, Terra Lightfoot, and Ginger St. James are among a choir of background vocals. Sweetheart of the Valley "shows the honky-tonk heroine...Lori Yates...at the very top of her game. This stellar collection of new songs showcase her twin talents as a compelling songwriter and the possessor of a voice that few can equal."

=== Matador ===
Matador was released in 2024. "It’s a beautifully-crafted work of nine original tracks, ringing with the true spirit of country — sorrow, heartache, danger and redemption." Matador was co-produced by Tim Vesely of Rheostatics and recorded at Blue Rodeo’s Woodshed Studio. The album features contributions from several well-known Canadian musicians, including Bazil Donovan, Jimmy Bowskill, Steve O’Connor, and the late David Baxter. O’Connor’s piano and organ arrangements introduced a new layer to Yates’s established sound. The track “Time After Time” was co-written with American songwriter Guy Clark.

Music scholar and Grammy Award winner Rob Bowman praised the album for its strong songwriting and emotive performances, calling Matador his favourite release of the year.

=== Present ===
She is an original member of power pop/punk band The Eveyln Dicks with Chris Houston (The Forgotten Rebels) and Buckshot Bebee, Jimmy Vapid (The Vapids) and Cleave Anderson (Battered Wives, Blue Rodeo).

Yates is the creator and producer of popular variety shows Johnny Cash – The Original Punk and Your Good Girl's Gonna Go Bad with The Nashville Rejects (Steve Miller, Ted Hawkins) as the back up band. She is the creator and producer of a popular ongoing six-week songwriting workshop combining group work, studio recording and live performance, The Creative Genius Songwriting Workshop.

Yates has gained a solid reputation as a photographer with her iPhone. As part of the i-phoneography movement, she shoots under the tag of #crazyates_xoxo. She has had three successful exhibitions:

- Killer Tomatoes, Hamilton's Finest Female Vocalists, 2015
- Framed, Hamilton Musicians & Creative Class, photo exhibit, 2014
- Disappearing Hamilton, photo exhibit, 2013

== Grants and awards ==
- City of Hamilton Arts Award – Established Artist 2014
- Ontario Arts Council – Songwriting Grant, 2014
- Hamilton Spectator People's Choice Awards 2012 – Favourite Female Vocalist, silver
- Songwriter of the Year – Hamilton Music Awards 2007
- Alternative Country Recording of the Year – Hamilton Music Awards 2007 for "The Book Of Minerva"
- Ontario Arts Council – Recording Grant, 2007
- SOCAN Award for No. 1 song "Usure De Jours"
- NOW Magazine "Best Band" Readers Poll – 2000
- Kensington Market Community Awards – Best Female Artist, 1993
- Juno Awards nomination 1990
- Canadian Country Music Association nomination 1990
- Inducted into the Frier's Music Museum as part of the "Shaking the Foundations; Women Trailblazers in Toronto Music, exhibit, 2025.

== Discography ==
=== Albums ===
Year	Title	Peak chart positions	
Year	Title	CAN Country	CAN
1989	Can't Stop The Girl	26	51
1994	Breaking Point	—	—
1996	Untogether	—	—
1999	Hey Stella!		
2007	The Book of Minerva	—	—
2015	Sweetheart of the Valley	—	—
2024	Matador		
"—" denotes releases that did not chart

=== Singles ===
Year	Title	Peak chart positions				Album
Year	Title	CAN Country	CAN AC	CAN	US Country	Album
1988	"Scene of the Crime"	51	—	—	77	Can't Stop the Girl
1989	"Promises, Promises"	45	—	—	78	Can't Stop the Girl
1994	"Make a Liar Out of Me"	59	15	81	—	Breaking Point
1994	"Li'l Darlin'"	32	—	—	—	Breaking Point
1994	"Rebel Angel"	38	—	—	—	Breaking Point
1997	"Lost Highway"	—	46	42	—	Untogether
"—" denotes releases that did not chart

=== Guest appearances ===
- The Lucky Ones album from Willie P. Bennett (1989)
- South at Eight, North at Nine album from Colin Linden (1993)
- Hell's Kitchen album from Leslie Spit Treeo (1994)
- In 1994, Lori Yates covered the song "Hepless" for the Neil Young Tribute Album Borrowed Tunes: A Tribute to Neil Young.

=== Soundtracks ===
- Next of Kin (1989)

Contributed a duet with Gregg Allman titled "Brother To Brother"

- Forever Knight - Original Television Soundtrack (1996)

Contributed vocals to "The Hunger", "Black Rose", "Touch The Night", "Dark Side of the Glass" and the intro to the Queen of Harps suite

- The Hanging Garden (1997)

Contributed the recording "The Future Is Here"

- Forever Knight - More Music from the Original Television Soundtrack (1999)

Contributed vocals to "The Night Calls My Name", "Heart of Darkness" and "Destiny's Edge"

=== Compilations and tributes ===
- Borrowed Tunes: A Tribute to Neil Young (1994)

Contributed a cover of the Neil Young composition "Helpless"

- Classic Country, Vol. 5 (2000)

Contributed the recording "Scene of the Crime"

- No Stranger to the Dark: The Best Of Gregg Allman (2002)

Features Allman and Yates' duet "Brother To Brother" from the Next of Kin soundtrack
