= Vultura Freeway =

Studio album by Art Bergmann
- Released: 2000
- Recorded: 1984
- Genre: Alternative rock
- Length: 40:05
- Label: Audio Monster

Art Bergmann chronology
| Design Flaw (1998) | Vultura Freeway (2000) | Lost Art Bergmann (2009) |

Vultura Freeway is the sixth studio album by Art Bergmann, released in 2000 on the Audio Monster record label. The album consisted of previously unreleased demo recordings Bergmann made in 1984 before releasing his debut album Crawl with Me in 1988. Several of the songs were rerecorded for the independent EPs he released with the band Poisoned before signing to Duke Street Records, or for his later solo albums.

== Track listing ==
All tracks are written by Art Bergmann except where noted

| No. | Title | Writer(s) | Length |
|---|---|---|---|
| 1. | "It Won’t Last" | Art Bergmann, Bill Scherk, Gordon Nicholl | 3:47 |
| 2. | "Emotion" | | 4:01 |
| 3. | "Poisoned" | | 4:12 |
| 4. | "Virgin Territory" | Bergmann, Scherk, Nicholl | 3:56 |
| 5. | "God’s Little Gift" | Bergmann, Scherk | 3:55 |
| 6. | "Yellow Pages" | | 4:20 |
| 7. | "Fade to Black" | | 3:31 |
| 8. | "Deathwatch" | | 3:53 |
| 9. | "Vultura Freeway" | | 4:04 |
| 10. | "Grey Area" | | 4:26 |
