= Lost Dakotas =

Canadian alternative country band

- Origin: Toronto, Ontario, Canada
- Genres: alternative country
- Years active: 1989–1996
- Labels: Cargo Records
- Past members: Greg McConnell; Paul Dakota; Adam Faux; Ron Duffy; Rick O'Brien; Tim Bovaconti; J.C. Orr

Lost Dakotas was a Canadian alternative country band in the 1990s. The band originally consisted of vocalist Paul Dakota and bassist Greg McConnell (formerly of Absolute Whores), who began in 1989 as a busking duo at the corner of Yonge and Dundas Streets in Toronto, Ontario.

Dakota and McConnell added guitarist Adam Faux and drummer Ron Duffy for their 1990 debut, Love to Play. Initially released as a limited edition cassette, the album completely sold out in just two days. The band's visuals, including posters, album art and animated video clips, were created by artist Erella Vent.

1991's Last Train to Kipling (a reference to Kipling station on the Toronto Transit Commission's Bloor-Danforth subway line) stayed in the campus radio charts in Chart for over 100 weeks. The album was most noted for a countrified cover of AC/DC's "Back in Black".

In 1992, Faux left to focus work on his previous band Pig Farm and was replaced by Rick O'Brien and later by Tim Bovaconti. The band supported the album with their first full-scale national tour in spring 1993.

Their third and final album, Sun Machine, was released in 1993 on Cargo Records. The album included a cover of Ned Sublette's "Cowboys Are Frequently, Secretly Fond of Each Other", 13 years before the song was made famous by Willie Nelson. At the 1993 Kumbaya Festival, the band performed the song live with rock singer Lee Aaron as guest vocalist. For their 1994 tour to support that album, the band was also joined by J.C. Orr, formerly of King Apparatus, as a second guitarist.

The band's final recording was a cover of Bob Snider's "You" on the 1996 tribute album Poetreason: The Songs of Bob Snider.

McConnell went on to form Stratochief, but died in 1999. He was replaced by Scott Bradshaw, who performed as the band's vocalist on both of their recorded albums. Erella Vent, now Erella Ganon, continues as an illustrator and writer. Adam Faux currently leads two bands with drummer Topher Stott, Hot Fo Gandhi and The Tiny Specks.

== Discography ==
=== Albums ===
- Love to Play (1990)
- Last Train to Kipling (1991)
- Sun Machine (1993)

=== Other appearances ===
- Kumbaya Album Nineteen Ninety Four (1994) - includes a live recording of "Cowboys Are Frequently Secretly"
- Poetreason: The Songs of Bob Snider (1996) - includes a live recording of "You"
