= Chocolate Chip Cookies (album) =

Studio album by Leslie Spit Treeo
- Released: 1996
- Label: Tag Tunes/Page Music
- Producer: Leslie Spit Treeo

Leslie Spit Treeo chronology
Hell's Kitchen (1994)	Chocolate Chip Cookies (1996)

Chocolate Chip Cookies is an album by Canadian folk rock band Leslie Spit Treeo, released in 1996. It is subtitled "A Rock & Roll Adventure".

The band intended to make "the mother of all concept albums." It contains a cover of Bob Snider's "Ancient Eyes". The band promoted the album by embarking on a full tour of Canada.

== Release ==
A double album, Chocolate Chip Cookies was originally released in a unique paper bag package similar to a cookie bag, with labelling that resembled the design of a Chips Ahoy! bag. Several weeks after the album's release, Nabisco threatened the band with a copyright infringement lawsuit, and in response, the band recalled all unsold copies of the album, held a bonfire in Toronto's High Park to burn the cookie bag packages, and rereleased the album in a conventional jewel case.

== Critical reception ==
Professional ratings
Review scores
Source	Rating
AllMusic	4.5/5 stars
Times Colonist	4.5/5 stars

The Times Colonist stated: "Those seeking Mellon Collie-type angst in their sprawling, double disc epics will take solace in 'Average Joe''s rallying chorus cry of 'Life sucks!' and ballad 'Book of Rejection''s assertion that 'self- esteem may be over-rated/You're going nowhere without some hatred'."

AllMusic wrote that "the whole, interspersed with Chipmunks-speed spoken-word snippets that more or less advance (or confuse) the narrative, is worthy of Frank Zappa's wry genius in its combination of self-mockery and pinpoint satire."

== Track listing ==
=== Disc One ===
1. Warning
2. Overture/Second
3. Nebulous
4. Bad Omen
5. Happily Ever After Again
6. Average Joe
7. Falling Down Again
8. Book of Rejection
9. The Single
10. Can't Stop
11. Talking
12. Bus to Nowhere
13. Chocolate Chip Cookies
14. Too You
15. Hell or Heaven
16. Bystander
17. Mole
18. Moth to a Flame
19. All Is Not Lost
20. Stuck in the Middle of a Song
21. Outro/Disappear

=== Disc Two ===
1. Oh Canada
2. Still Talking
3. Roly Poly
4. Soup Line
5. All on Myself
6. Ancient Eyes
7. Pirates
8. Lonely Only
9. How Much Is That Doggie
10. It's a Dog's Life
11. Warthogs Can Fly
12. People
13. Moderation
14. A Way In
15. The Single (Dance Remix)
16. So Close Yet So Far
17. UFO
18. Cathy
19. Sheila
20. Serendipity
21. Hold Strong
