= Rusty (band) =

Canadian alternative rock band

- Origin: Toronto, Ontario, Canada
- Genres: Alternative rock
- Years active: 1994–2000, 2011–present
- Labels: Handsome Boy; BMG
- Members: John Lalley; Ken MacNeil; Scott McCullough; John Sutton
- Past members: Jim Moore; Mitch Perkins; Bob Vespaziani

Rusty is a Canadian alternative rock band formed in 1994 in Toronto, Ontario, Canada. The band earned a 1996 Juno Award nomination in the category of Best Alternative Album for Fluke.

== History ==
Rusty's origins are in One Free Fall, a band from Wolfville, Nova Scotia, who moved to Toronto in 1988. That band's core members were vocalist Ken MacNeil, guitarist Sandy Graham, bassist Jim Moore and drummer Bob Vespaziani. Their first EP, Quoc-Te in 1991, was produced by Garth Richardson in Los Angeles, with drums played by Chad Smith of the Red Hot Chili Peppers, a band Richardson had previously worked with. One Free Fall signed to independent label Handsome Boy Records, owned by their manager Jeff Rogers and released the album Mud Creek in 1993 and collaborated with Art Bergmann on a cover of "Prisoners of Rock 'n Roll" for the Neil Young tribute album Borrowed Tunes: A Tribute to Neil Young, but broke up in 1994 before achieving any notable success.

Following their breakup, MacNeil, Moore and Vespaziani joined with former Doughboys member Scott McCullough to form Rusty, and recorded the EP Wake Me in 1994. A video for the song "Wake Me" would become a minor hit on MuchMusic. Released on Handsome Boy Records, the EP was popular on Canadian campus radio, and led to a major label distribution deal with BMG Records for their full-length album Fluke in July 1995. Vespaziani left the group and was replaced by Mitch Perkins.

Led by the hit single "Misogyny", which featured a video consisting of clips from Canadian filmmaker Bruce LaBruce's film Hustler White as well as Canadian singer Danko Jones, Fluke was the band's commercial breakthrough, also spawning the single "California", and earning a Juno Award nomination for Best Alternative Album. The album was produced by Chris Wardman, who also played guitar on the tracks "Groovy Dead" and "California".

During this time period Jim Moore played bass on the demos and one song for Art Bergmann's album What Fresh Hell is This? The album was also produced by Chris Wardman, it won the Juno album Award for the Alternative album of the year for 1996; Rusty's Fluke was also up for the award in the category.

In 1996, the band contributed a cover of "Let's Break Robert Out of Jail" to the compilation album A Tribute to Hard Core Logo. Also in 1996 the song "Punk" was included on soundtrack to Chris Farley's movie Black Sheep. The band also performed at 'Snow Job' that year, an annual television special and outdoor concert series, broadcast by MuchMusic.

The band's follow-up album, Sophomoric, was released in February 1997. The album featured the single "Empty Cell", which was a hit in Canada. The song's music video won a MuchMusic Video Award for "Best Concept Video". Perkins left the band that year and was replaced by former Bootsauce drummer John Lalley. Perkins left the group due to creative differences and released an electronic album independently with Andrew Massey under the name "Blu Pernu". This year the band also contributed a cover of "Scratches And Needles" by The Nils to the compilation album Scratches & Needles - A Tribute to the Nils from Magwheel Records.

In 1998, Rusty released their third full-length album, Out of Their Heads, which according to Jim Moore was written day by day in the studio and was done in three days. In May 1999, it was revealed that the band had broken up. The band played their farewell show on November 25, 2000, at The Opera House in Toronto.

=== Reunion, Dogs of Canada ===
In 2011, Rusty reunited for the 2011 NXNE festival. The lineup consisted of MacNeil, McCullough, Lalley and Jim Moore. The band has continued to perform occasional shows in the following years with John Sutton taking over on bass. Jim Moore moved to England in 2005 and played bass during Rusty's 2011 reunion show. He has since returned to playing drums (his first instrument) with several bands in England.

In December 2017, the band launched a crowdfunding for a new album through PledgeMusic.

Producer Chris Wardman posted Rusty's unreleased cover of Donovan's "Season of the Witch" on his SoundCloud page in 2012.

The band released the new album, titled Dogs of Canada, on June 23, 2018.

== Members ==
=== Current members ===
- Ken MacNeil – vocals (1994–2000, 2011–present)
- Scott McCullough – guitars (1994–2000, 2011–present)
- John Lalley – drums (1997–2000, 2011–present)
- John Sutton – bass (2011–present)

=== Former members ===
- Jim Moore – bass (1994–2000, two shows in 2011)
- Bob Vespaziani – drums (1994–1995)
- Mitch Perkins – drums (1995–1997)

== Discography ==
=== Albums ===
- Fluke (1995)
- Sophomoric (1997)
- Out of Their Heads (1998)
- Dogs of Canada (2018)

=== EPs ===
- Rusty (1994)

=== Singles ===
| Year | Single | Chart peaks | | | | Album |
| Year | Single | CAN | CAN Alt | US Alt | MM Countdown | Album |
|---|---|---|---|---|---|---|
| 1995 | "Wake Me" | — | — | 26 | — | Fluke |
| 1995 | "Groovy Dead" | — | — | — | — | Fluke |
| 1995 | "Misogyny" | — | 3 | — | 22 | Fluke |
| 1996 | "California" | — | 12 | — | — | Fluke |
| 1997 | "Empty Cell" | 24 | — | — | 12 | Sophomoric |
| 1997 | "Oh No Joe" | — | — | — | — | Sophomoric |
| 1997 | "It's Christmas Time (And I'm Poor)" | — | — | — | — | Out Of Their Heads |
| 1998 | "Soul For Sale" | — | — | — | — | Out Of Their Heads |
| 1998 | "Memories" | — | — | — | 20 | Out Of Their Heads |
| 2019 | "Home" | — | — | — | — | Dogs of Canada |
"—" denotes a release that did not chart.
