= Angel from Montgomery =

1971 John Prine song

Song by John Prine

from the album John Prine
- Released: January 1, 1971
- Studio: American Recording Studios, Memphis, Tennessee
- Genre: Country
- Length: 3:43
- Label: Atlantic
- Songwriter: John Prine
- Producer: Arif Mardin

"Angel from Montgomery" is a song written by John Prine, originally appearing on his self-titled 1971 album. The song has been covered extensively by various artists.

== Background ==
John Prine wrote "Angel from Montgomery" after a friend suggested writing "another song about old people," referring to Prine's song "Hello in There." Although Prine had "said everything I wanted to [about seniors] in 'Hello in There'" he was intrigued by the idea of "a song about a middle-aged woman who feels older than she is...[Eventually] I had this really vivid picture of this woman standing over the dishwater with soap in her hands...She wanted to get out of her house and her marriage and everything. She just wanted an angel to come to take her away from all this." Prine believes he likely was drawn to Montgomery as the song's setting by virtue of being a fan of Hank Williams, who had ties to that city.

Angel from Montgomery was the original title of the Cherie Bennett/Jeff Gottesfeld screenplay that became the 2006 movie Broken Bridges. The screenplay's setting of Montgomery was changed to the fictitious Armour Springs in the movie.

The song is used in the film Who Bombed Judi Bari?. It is also sung by Marc Menchaca, in the last episode of the series Ozark. In 2021, it was ranked at No. 350 on Rolling Stone's "Top 500 Greatest Songs of All Time". In June 2026, CBS News included the song in its list of the 250 essential American songs of the past 250 years.

== Other versions ==
John Prine introduced "Angel from Montgomery" on his self-titled debut album in 1971. Carly Simon recorded it, but did not release it, in 1972 in her first session for No Secrets, produced by Paul Buckmaster and featuring James Taylor's vocals and Danny Kortchmar on guitar. Simon recalls: "Elektra rejected [the tracks from that session] and...asked me to work with Richard Perry. [Elektra] didn't think Buckmaster would produce a hit record for me." Simon's version did not surface until she released her 1995 box set, Clouds in My Coffee, for which the track was finally mixed and mastered.

While Bonnie Koloc recorded "Angel from Montgomery" in 1972 on her album Hold on to Me, the song achieved its first high-profile artist cover in 1973 when John Denver included it—as "Angels from Montgomery"—on his Farewell Andromeda. But it was Bonnie Raitt's version, on her 1974 album Streetlights, that first attained wide recognition for the song. In a 2000 interview, Raitt stated: "I think 'Angel from Montgomery' probably has meant more to my fans and my body of work than any other song, and it will historically be considered one of the most important ones I've ever recorded. It's just such a tender way of expressing that sentiment of longing - like 'Hello in There' - without being maudlin or obvious. It has all the different shadings of love and regret and longing. It's a perfect expression from [a] wonderful genius."

Raitt has covered the song several times. She sang it in duet with John Prine in 1985 at a concert in tribute to Steve Goodman. (Prine, Goodman, and Bonnie Koloc were then considered the "trinity of the Chicago folk scene.") She performed the song with Rickie Lee Jones at the original Farm Aid benefit concert held 22 September 1985 in Champaign, Illinois; and with Tracy Chapman at the We the Planet Festival on 20 April 2003 in Golden Gate Park, San Francisco. On her 1995 live disc Road Tested, on which "Angel from Montgomery" serves as the concert finale, Raitt is joined on the song by Bryan Adams, Jackson Browne, Bruce Hornsby and Kim Wilson.

The Leslie Spit Treeo covered this song on their 1990 debut album, Don't Cry Too Hard, in a hard rock theme.

Keller Williams performed the song at one of his early recorded shows at Fin's in Virginia Beach on Oct. 4, 1994.

Susan Tedeschi recorded the song on her debut album, Just Won't Burn, released in 1998. It has since become a favorite, and she has also performed it often with the Tedeschi Trucks Band.

"Angel from Montgomery" is performed in the film Into the Wild by the characters Tracy Tatro (Kristen Stewart) and Christopher McCandless (Emile Hirsch). It does not appear on the soundtrack album. The chorus is sung briefly in the film Courage Under Fire by the character Captain Karen Emma Walden (portrayed by Meg Ryan) during one of the flashback sequences.

The song was heard on the live television benefit broadcast on CMT May 12, 2011, performed by Gretchen Wilson. The Music Builds concert and fundraiser was to benefit the American Red Cross in the wakes of the floods and tornadoes throughout the Southeastern United States in April and May 2011.

Ruth Langmore imagines her late uncle, Russ Langmore, performing the song in a wistful scene during the last episode of the fourth and final season of the Netflix series Ozark.

"Angel from Montgomery" is a concert staple of Hank Williams' granddaughter, Holly Williams.

Singer Eddie Money's daughter Jesse recorded a version of the song in 2024 for a future solo release inspired by Bonnie Raitt's version of the song.
