= Bombazine (album) =

Studio album by Meryn Cadell
- Released: September 14, 1993
- Recorded: 1993
- Genre: Pop
- Label: Sire
- Producers: John Tucker, Meryn Cadell

Meryn Cadell chronology
Angel Food for Thought (1991)	Bombazine (1993)	6 Blocks (1997)

Bombazine is the second album by the Canadian musician Meryn Cadell, released on September 14, 1993. The first single was "Window of Opportunity". Cadell supported the album with a North American tour.

== Production ==
Recorded in Toronto, the album was produced by John Tucker and Cadell. Cadell considered creating music for film and television before deciding to proceed with Bombazine. She prioritized her lyrics, changing melodies to accommodate the language, if need be. Ben Mink cowrote "Window of Opportunity". The Rheostatics played on "Steam Clean Express". "Janet Clark" is about a teller who falls in love with the man who robs her bank. "Curb" concerns a woman stuck in traffic after breaking up with her boyfriend. "Jonny and Betty" is about a gay man and a lesbian who are high school classmates and who later marry. "Bark on the Tree" reflects on a dissolved romantic relationship. "Georgian Bay, 24 & Forevermore" is about feelings of disconnection.

== Critical reception ==
Professional ratings
Review scores
Source	Rating
AllMusic	4/5 stars
Calgary Herald	B+

The Toronto Star said that "Cadell here reveals her ample vocal skills, which bring to mind Joni Mitchell on several folkier numbers and—no doubt the influence of working with Ben Mink—the torch sound of k.d. lang"; the paper later listed the album as the seventh best of 1993. The Calgary Herald opined, "From the scat-rap rhythms of 'Jonny and Betty' to the haunting folkish-pop strains of 'Mirror Room', Meryn is diverse and sensual." The Globe and Mail stated that "she's managed to turn both more serious and more musical without losing any of her breezy nonchalance or charm."

The Times Colonist called the songs "darker, spooky, enchanting and bruised... Real human stories of desperation, survival and triumph." The Washington Post stated, "There are echoes, too, of Suzanne Vega's mechanized folk pop on 'Voice for Gloria', but Cadell is far too distinctive, quirky and daring a writer for the comparisons to stick or the references to matter." The Knoxville News Sentinel praised the three spoken word pieces as the best tracks.

== Track listing ==
No.	Title	Length
1.	"Jonny and Betty"
2.	"Time O/O Lives"
3.	"Curb"
4.	"Janet Clark"
5.	"Georgian Bay, 24 & Forevermore"
6.	"Steam Clean Express"
7.	"Organ"
8.	"Abelyne"
9.	"Super"
10.	"Window of Opportunity"
11.	"Bark on the Tree"
12.	"Voice for Gloria"
13.	"Mirror Room"
14.	"Strength"
