= Chalk Circle (Canadian band) =

Canadian alternative rock band

- Origin: Newcastle, Ontario, Canada
- Genre: Alternative rock
- Years active: 1982–1990, 2006
- Labels: Duke Street, Universal
- Members: Chris Tait; Brad Hopkins; Jason Sniderman; Derrick Murphy
- Past members: Tad Winklarz
- Website: chalkcircle.ca

Chalk Circle was a Canadian alternative rock band formed in 1982 in Newcastle, Ontario. The band originally consisted of lead singer and guitarist Chris Tait, bassist Brad Hopkins, keyboardist Tad Winklarz and drummer Derrick Murphy.

== History ==
Formed in Newcastle, Ontario, Hopkins and Tait were paired with Terry Miller and Stani Veselinovic in 1982 as The Casualties. The band briefly changed its name to The Reactors and then to New Addition in 1984, and finally settled on the name Chalk Circle, taken from Bertolt Brecht's play The Caucasian Chalk Circle.

The band recorded a demo single "The World" (b/w "Black Pit") on cassette and played the Toronto area, subsequently winning the CASBY Award for Most Promising Non-Recording Group in 1985. After signing to Duke Street Records in Toronto, their 1986 debut release was a six-song EP called The Great Lake. Produced by Chris Wardman, it was recorded at Manta Sound in Toronto and Quest Recording Studio in Oshawa. The band's style saw them positively compared to British and Irish post-punk bands of the era, including U2, Echo and the Bunnymen and The Smiths.

The lead single "April Fool" became a hit single in Canada, along with another single "Me, Myself and I". The band produced videos for both tracks which were regularly featured on MuchMusic, and the EP went on to become Duke Street's biggest seller at that time. They received a Juno Award nomination for Most Promising Group at the Juno Awards of 1986.

Their second release was a full-length album entitled Mending Wall released in 1987, with the inspiration for the title coming from Robert Frost's famous poem. Recorded entirely on digital equipment, the crisp sounding album featured another Top 10 Canadian single "This Mourning", a blistering commentary about nuclear politics in the 'ray gun' era (Reagan Era) era of the late 1980s. The album would later be reissued with a cover version of T-Rex's "20th Century Boy", which also became a Canadian hit single.

The band's final album was 1989's As the Crow Flies, which spawned two singles, "Sons and Daughters" and "Together". It also included the song "Blue Heaven", which included guest vocals by labelmate Jane Siberry. The album was engineered by Michael Phillip Wojewoda, who received a Juno nomination for Best Recording Engineer at the Juno Awards of 1990.

Citing 'creative differences', the band broke up in 1990, and Tait formed the indie band Big Faith with Fergus Marsh, Michael Sloski and Ken Greer.

In 2006, Universal Music Group released a Chalk Circle greatest hits compilation as part of its 20th Century Masters series. The release prompted the band to reconvene after 15 years and in February of that year, they began rehearsals at the Cherry Beach rehearsal studios in Toronto in anticipation of possible reunion shows. On June 17, 2006, Chalk Circle played a reunion gig at Lee's Palace in Toronto.

In recent years they have played additional shows including on October 1, 2011 and December 12, 2015, with Blue Peter at the Phoenix in Toronto, and on November 12, 2011 in Montreal for the first time in 20 years at Corona Theatre. Most reunion concerts feature Jason Sniderman on keyboards instead of Winklarz. The band played a reunion concert on March 7, 2020 at a fundraising concert for breast cancer. On July 29, 2023, the band played a reunion concert in Chris Tait's hometown as part of the celebrations of the 100th anniversary of the Newcastle Community Hall.

== Discography ==
Year	Album details	RPM
1986	The Great Lake; Label: Duke Street Records	40
1987	Mending Wall; Label: Duke Street Records	24
1989	As the Crow Flies; Label: Duke Street Records	78
2006	The Best of Chalk Circle; Label: Universal Music Group	—

== Singles ==
=== Singles ===
Year	Single	Peak positions	Album
Year	Single	CAN	Album
1985	"The World"	—	non-album single
1986	"April Fool"	21	The Great Lake
1986	"Me, Myself and I"	92	The Great Lake
1987	"This Mourning"	28	Mending Wall
1987	"20th Century Boy"	44	Mending Wall
1987	"N.I.M.B.Y."	—	Mending Wall
1989	"Sons and Daughters"	—	As the Crow Flies
1989	"Together"	—	As the Crow Flies
