= Art Bergmann =

Canadian rock singer-songwriter

Art Bergmann CM
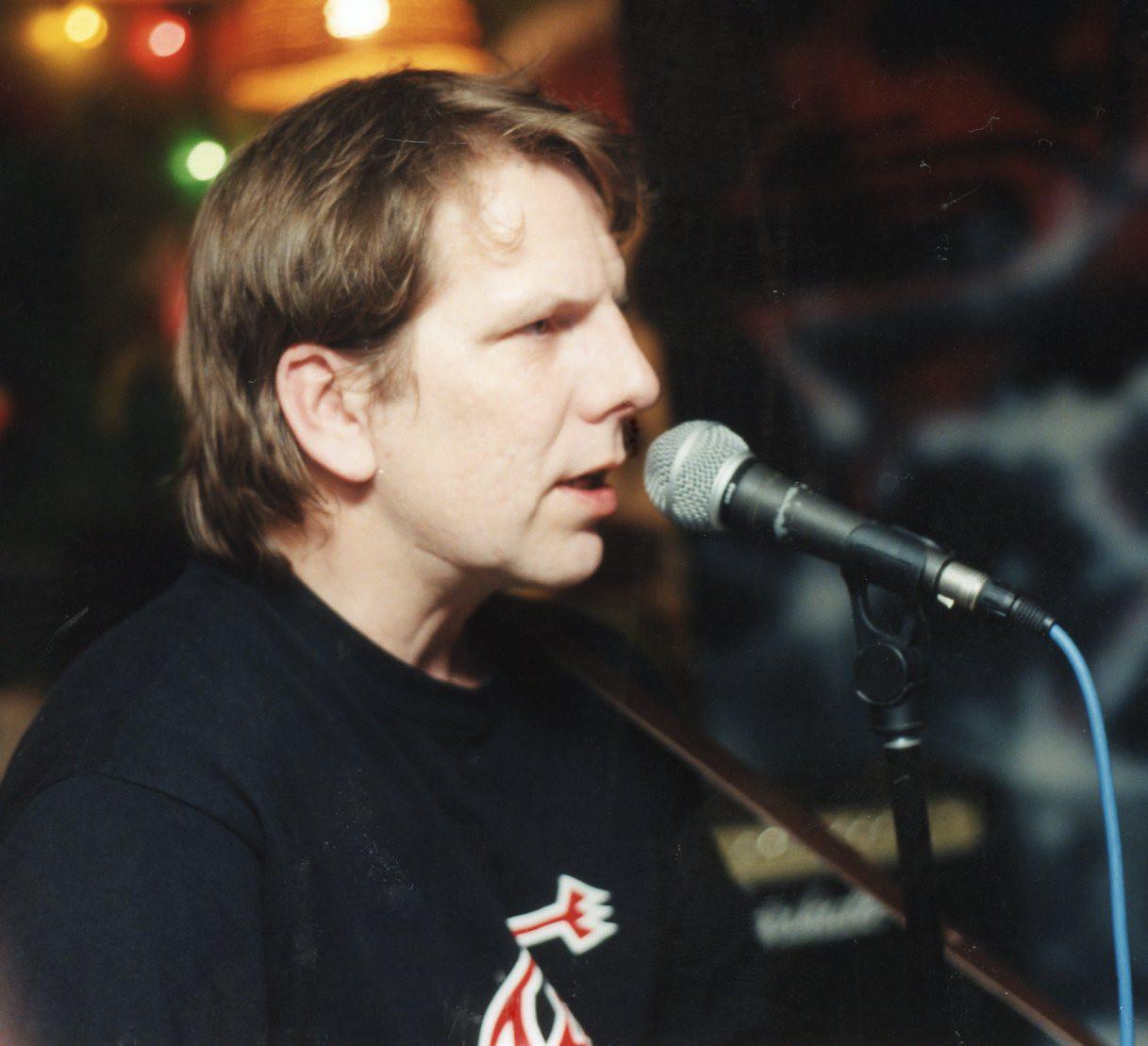
- Art Bergmann performing at the 10 Day Cafe in Stratford, Ontario in 1996.

Background information
- Born: Arthur Frank Bergmann; February 8, 1953 (age 73); Vancouver, British Columbia, Canada
- Genres: Punk rock; alternative rock
- Occupations: Singer; songwriter; guitarist
- Instruments: Vocals; guitar
- Years active: 1970s–present

Arthur Frank Bergmann CM (born February 8, 1953, in Vancouver, British Columbia) is a Canadian rock singer-songwriter who was one of the key figures in Canadian punk rock in the late 1970s. Bergmann was made a member of the Order of Canada in 2021.

== Punk bands ==
Art Bergmann began his musical career with an Abbotsford band called the Mount Lehman Grease Band. After Mount Lehman folded, he founded his own band called the Notorious Smorg Brothers, which he stocked with a myriad of different support artists.

Bergmann was later the lead singer and songwriter for Vancouver punk stalwarts Young Canadians (formerly The K-Tels). Although the Young Canadians only recorded two independent EPs and a single before breaking up, their song "Hawaii" (co-written with Ross Carpenter) is one of the classic Canadian punk anthems. Although long out of print, the EPs, along with some unreleased live material, were reissued in 1995 as the album No Escape.

== Solo career ==
In the 1980s, Bergmann played with Vancouver independent bands Los Popularos and Poisoned before the latter band signed to Duke Street Records in 1988. Due to confusion with the popular American band Poison which had marred the band's most recent tour, however, the label decided to bill the band's releases as solo albums by Bergmann.

He released his debut solo album, the John Cale-produced Crawl with Me, that year. He garnered a Juno Award nomination for Most Promising Male Vocalist at the Juno Awards of 1989, and James O'Mara and Kate Ryan were nominated for Best Music Video for Bergmann's "Our Little Secret".

1990's Sexual Roulette, produced by Chris Wardman, became Bergmann's mainstream breakthrough, spawning the rock radio hit "Bound for Vegas" and garnering him a deal with Polygram Records.

He followed up with a self-titled album on Polygram in 1991, again garnering significant radio airplay for the singles "Faithlessly Yours", "If She Could Sing", and "Message From Paul". Bergmann continued to tour extensively during this era. This included Big, Bad & Groovy, a package tour of Canadian artists that included Bergmann, Sons of Freedom, Pure, and headliners Bootsauce.

In 1994, he collaborated with One Free Fall on a cover of Neil Young's "Prisoners of Rock and Roll" for the tribute album Borrowed Tunes, leading to a new deal with Sony Records for 1995's What Fresh Hell Is This?. That album won the Juno Award for Best Alternative Rock Album at the Juno Awards of 1996, but the album was not a strong performer on the charts and he was then dropped from the label. Bergmann quit the music business for a period following his release by Sony, performing sporadically between 1995 and 1998.

The 1998 Design Flaw, produced by Peter J. Moore and released on the independent label Other People's Music, was a reworking of tracks from his first three albums, plus a cover of Gram Parsons' "Sin City". The songs featured Bergmann on acoustic guitar, with backing by Chris Spedding on electric. Bergmann then released Vultura Freeway, a compilation of unreleased demo recordings from the early 1980s, in 2000, with liner notes from Pointed Sticks front man Nick Jones.

Following Vultura Freeway, however, Bergmann withdrew from the music business for several years, due to health difficulties with degenerative arthritis.

In 2009, Bergmann's bassist Ray Fulber compiled the CD Lost Art Bergmann, which featured early demo versions of most of the songs that appeared on the 1988 John Cale produced album. These demo recordings served as a tonic to many fans as they have a more guitar driven sound than the keyboard heavy Cale produced sessions.

On 26 August 2014, Bergmann released Songs for the Underclass on the independent label (weewerk).

On 13 May 2016, Bergmann released The Apostate, his first full-length album of new material since 1995, on weewerk Records.

On 12 May 2017, Bergmann released Remember Her Name, a remastered edition of his self-titled 1991 album.

On 30 December 2020, Bergmann was made a Member of the Order of Canada, for his "indelible contributions to the Canadian punk music scene, and for his thought-provoking discourse on social, gender and racial inequalities."

On 21 May 2021, Bergmann released Late Stage Empire Dementia on (weewerk) Recordings. On 29 September 2023, he followed up with ShadowWalk: Legacy of Love, an album inspired by the death in 2022 of his wife Sherri Decembrini.

== Film appearances ==
Art Bergmann has appeared in two Bruce McDonald films, Highway 61 as Otto and Hard Core Logo as himself, and as a musician in Conjurer of Monikers. Additionally, he was featured in Bloodied but Unbowed, a film featured at the 2010 Vancouver Documentary Film Festival.

== Discography ==
- Crawl with Me (1988)
- Sexual Roulette (1990)
- Art Bergmann (1991)
- What Fresh Hell Is This? (1995)
- Design Flaw (1998)
- Vultura Freeway (2000)
- Lost Art Bergmann (2009)
- Songs for the Underclass (2014)
- The Apostate (2016)
- Remember Her Name (2017)
- Late Stage Empire Dementia (2021)
- ShadowWalk: Legacy of Love (2023)
