= Lost Art Bergmann =

Studio album by Art Bergmann
- Released: 2009
- Genre: Alternative rock
- Label: Bearwood Music
- Producer: Bob Rock; Paul Hyde

Art Bergmann chronology
Vultura Freeway (2000)	Lost Art Bergmann (2009)	Songs for the Underclass (2014)

Lost Art Bergmann is the seventh studio album by Art Bergmann, released in 2009 on the Bearwood Music record label. The album comprises early recordings which Bergmann and his band had made with producers Bob Rock and Paul Hyde prior to completing his debut album, Crawl with Me, with producer John Cale.

The album was compiled and remastered by Ray Fulber, the bassist in Bergmann's band. The original tapes had deteriorated so badly that Fulber had to bake them for six hours in a food dehydrator to make them playable again.

Many music journalists had criticized the original album's production, which downplayed Bergmann's guitar in favour of a keyboard-oriented sound that was uncharacteristic of Bergmann's normal musical style. The new album was more widely praised, with Vancouver Sun critic John Mackie calling it "the best album Art Bergmann never made".

== Track listing ==
1. "The Junkie Don't Care"
2. "To Tell the Truth"
3. "Black Heart"
4. "Who Will Ever Know"
5. "Final Cliché"
6. "My Empty House"
7. "Inside Your Love"
8. "Runaway Train"
9. "Our Little Secret"
10. "Ill Repute"
