= Songs for the Underclass =

Studio album by Art Bergmann
- Released: August 26, 2014
- Genre: Alternative rock
- Length: 24:09
- Label: Weewerk
- Producer: Lorrie Matheson

Art Bergmann chronology
Lost Art Bergmann (2009)	Songs for the Underclass (2014)	The Apostate (2016)

Songs for the Underclass is an EP by Art Bergmann, released August 26, 2014 on weewerk.

Prior to writing and recording the EP, Bergmann had spent several years effectively retired from the music business. Living on a farm in rural Alberta while recovering from degenerative arthritis, he continued to perform sporadic live shows and released two albums of archival demo recordings, but had not recorded a new album since 1998's Design Flaw. The EP, one of the most explicitly political works of Bergmann's career, was inspired by his renewed anger at the direction of contemporary politics, and was supported by his most extensive tour of concert dates since the 1990s.

== Track listing ==
No.	Title	Length
1.	"Drones of Democracy"	7:44
2.	"Company Store"	5:15
3.	"Ballad of a Crooked Man"	7:02
4.	"Your Cold Appraising Eye"	4:08
