= Don't Cry Too Hard =

Studio album by Leslie Spit Treeo
- Released: 1990
- Label: Capitol
- Producer: Chris Wardman

Don't Cry Too Hard is the debut album by Canadian folk rock band Leslie Spit Treeo, released in 1990. The album's primary single on radio was a cover of John Prine's "Angel from Montgomery", although the songs "Heat" and "The Sound" (which had previously appeared on the soundtrack to Bruce McDonald's film Roadkill) also garnered radio airplay.

Following the album's release, the band won the Juno Award for Most Promising Group at the Juno Awards of 1991.

== Critical reception ==
Professional ratings
Review scores
Source	Rating
AllMusic	4.5/5 stars
Calgary Herald	C+

Helen Metella of the Edmonton Journal praised the album's "stark but sturdy songs", writing that they were made special by the "throaty, elastic and daring performance of [lead singer Laura] Hubert, who can switch from dreamy folk (Separate) to deeply ironic C&W (Talkin') as quickly as most buskers can whip out the hat".

== Track listing ==
1. "Separate"
2. "Like Yesterday"
3. "Angel from Montgomery"
4. "Moon at Noon"
5. "UFO (Catch the Highway)"
6. "One Thought Too Long"
7. "Real"
8. "Heat"
9. "Dust"
10. "Talkin'"
11. "In the Round"
12. "The Sound"
