= Ontario Libertarian Party =

Provincial political party in Canada

Ontario Libertarian Party Parti libertarien de l'Ontario
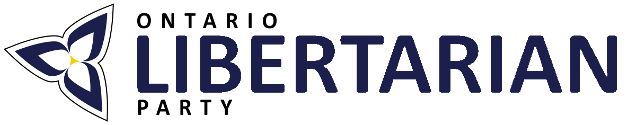
- Leader: Sean Conroy
- President: Michelle Lashbrook
- Deputy Leader: Justin Leroux
- Chairperson: Michelle Lashbrook
- Vice Chairman: Scott Marshall
- Secretary: Coreen Corcoran
- Chief Financial Officer: Neal Donnelly
- Founded: July 24, 1974
- Registered: August 18, 1976
- Headquarters: 5115 County Road 10 Fournier ON K0B 1G0
- Membership (2018): <600
- Ideology: Libertarianism
- Colours: Yellow

Website
- libertarian.on.ca

The Ontario Libertarian Party (OLP; French: Parti libertarien de l'Ontario) is a minor libertarian party in the Canadian province of Ontario.

The party is guided by a charter of principles, and proposes an Ontario charter of rights and freedoms which includes a section on immigration language restrictions. It holds that Ontario is a "sovereign state within the nation of Canada", and seeks to increase provincial autonomy.

== History ==
On May 26, 1974, Terry Coughlin was elected the first leader of the party at the Libertarian Party of Canada convention. The party was officially founded on July 24, 1974 in Whitby.

In 1978, a benefit concert named "Rock Against Repression" was organised by the punk group Battered Wives; proceeds were split between the Canadian Civil Liberties Association and Ontario Libertarian Party.

== Leaders ==
Leader	Term start	Term end	Notes
George Dance	June 9, 1995	1996	Interim
Sam Apelbaum	October 1996	November 5, 2011	
Allen Small	November 5, 2011	July 13, 2018	
Rob Ferguson	July 13, 2018	November 2, 2019	Interim
Keith Komar	November 2, 2019	October 24, 2021	
Mark Snow	October 24, 2021	November 15, 2025	
Sean Conroy	November 15, 2025	present	

== Election results ==
Results of the 2014 Ontario general election showing support for Libertarian candidates by riding

In the 2007 general election, the party fielded 25 candidates and obtained a total of 9,249 votes.

In the 2011 general election, the party ran 51 candidates and won a total of 19,387 votes; the party received 0.45% of the popular vote, which was more than double the number of candidates and votes received in 2007.

In the 2018 Ontario general election, the Libertarian Party ran in 117 out of 124 ridings, receiving 0.74% of the overall vote.

The party fielded only 16 candidates in the 2022 Ontario general election.

In 1986, president Kaye Sargent received 93 votes in the Cochrane North by-election. In 2024, leader Mark Snow received 129 votes, 0.35%, in a by-election in Bay of Quinte.

The party has never won a seat in the Legislative Assembly of Ontario.

Election results
Election year	Leader	No. of overall votes	% of overall total	No. of candidates run	No. of seats won	+/−	Presence
1975	Terry Coughlin	4,752	0.13%	17	0 / 125	New Party	Extra-parliamentary
1977	Paul Mollon	9,961	0.30%	31	0 / 125	0	Extra-parliamentary
1981	Scott Bell	7,087	0.22%	12	0 / 125	0	Extra-parliamentary
1985	Scott Bell	12,831	0.4%	17	0 / 125	0	Extra-parliamentary
1987	Kaye Sargent	13,514	0.36%	25	0 / 130	0	Extra-parliamentary
1990	James Stock	24,613	0.61%	45	0 / 130	0	Extra-parliamentary
1995	John Shadbolt	6,085	0.15%	7	0 / 130	0	Extra-parliamentary
1999	Sam Apelbaum	2,337	0.05%	7	0 / 103	0	Extra-parliamentary
2003	Sam Apelbaum	1,991	0.04%	5	0 / 103	0	Extra-parliamentary
2007	Sam Apelbaum	9,249	0.21%	25	0 / 107	0	Extra-parliamentary
2011	Sam Apelbaum	19,447	0.45%	51	0 / 107	0	Extra-parliamentary
2014	Allen Small	37,696	0.81%	74	0 / 107	0	Extra-parliamentary
2018	Allen Small	42,918	0.75%	117	0 / 124	0	Extra-parliamentary
2022	Mark Snow	5,242	0.11%	16	0 / 124	0	Extra-parliamentary
2025	Mark Snow	7,684	0.15%	17	0 / 124	0	Extra-parliamentary

== See also ==
- Libertarian Party candidates, 2003 Ontario provincial election
- List of Ontario general elections
- List of political parties in Canada
