= Slowburn (band) =

Canadian alternative rock band

- Origin: Vancouver, British Columbia, Canada
- Genres: Alternative rock
- Years active: 1990's
- Label: Handsome Boy Records
- Past members: Cliff Boyd; Charles Boname; Robert Watkins; Neil Atkinson; Harvey Windsor; Christopher Pollon

Slowburn was a Canadian alternative rock band, best known for the 1996 Alternative top-10 single "Whatever" from their self-titled album released on the Handsome Boy Records label and from the soundtrack to the 1995 movie My Teacher's Wife.

The video directed by Ulf Buddensieck from the second single from the album, "Hit the Ground", was nominated for a Much Music Best Independent Video award.

== History ==
Formed in Vancouver, Slowburn consisted of lead singer and rhythm guitarist Cliff Boyd, drummer Robert Watkins, lead guitarist Charles Boname, and a variety of bassists. Their first bassist was Neil Atkinson. Atkinson was followed by Harvey Windsor and finally, former Goldfish bassist Christopher Pollon. The original name for the band was Catherine Wheel, however because there was already a successful English band with the same name, they chose Slowburn before the release of their debut album Sparked in 1994. That same year, the band's song "Whatever" began to receive radio airplay.

In 1996, Slowburn released a self-titled album, that featured a re-recording of "Whatever" that originally appeared on Sparked, and two other singles: "Hit the Ground" and "Flesh + Bone". The album was recorded at Mushroom Studios, and mixed at Bryan Adams Home Studio by Randy Staub. Former Blue Peter guitarist Chris Wardman produced the album. The self-titled album was a moderate success on Canadian Campus Chart, debuting at No. 34 on April 30, 1996, and peaking at No. 16 on June 11.

In addition to success on the album charts, the single "Whatever" debuted at No. 28 on the RPM Alternative 30 charts on April 29, 1996, peaking at No. 10, where it stayed for two weeks in June 1996.

After touring extensively behind their self-titled album, the band broke up in the midst of finishing their third album. Only one song, "Galactic", from the unreleased album has appeared.

== Post breakup ==
After the band broke up, Charles Boname attended the British Columbia Institute of Technology and graduated in June 2001. Charles joined a Beatles tribute band named Fab Fourever, playing the part of George. They continue to tour North America and have been invited to Liverpool to play The Cave night club during the city’s Beatles festival.

Cliff Boyd spent several years in Europe, most notably in Chester, UK, where he completed an MSc in Information Systems at the University of Chester, before returning to Vancouver in 2009. Cliff currently works as a Web Designer and continues to write songs.

Bassist Christopher Pollon returned to journalism; he has authored two award-winning nonfiction books and is widely published as an environmental and business writer in magazines and newspapers across North America..
