= Kinetic Ideals =

- Origin: Toronto, Ontario, Canada
- Genres: Alternative rock, post-punk
- Years active: 1980–2014
- Labels: Mannequin Records
- Past members: Mike Rullman; Jean-Claude Chambers; Alan Murrell; Patrick Duffy; Jonathan Davies; Bruce PM
- Website: https://soundcloud.com/kinetic-ideals

Kinetic Ideals was a Canadian new wave band from Toronto, Ontario. They released one single and three EPs on the Mannequin record label, formed by Paul Abrahams, manager of the new romantic group Spoons (band).

Their first single, "Life In Shadow" / "Maze of Ways" was the second release on Burlington-based Mannequin, following on the Spoons debut. It had a rough and ready quality with a one-two punk beat that sounded a little retro even in 1980.

In 1981, they issued a five-track EP, Reason that established the sound they became known for, a moodier post-Joy Division groove that fit with other locals like Sheep Look Up and Breeding Ground. Brett Wickens was by now working for Peter Saville Associates in England, and designed an angular modernist cover in the mold of early New Order releases.

This combination of compelling music, improved production and visual design garnered the band critical acclaim. Mike Rullman (vocals), Jean-Claude Chambers (guitars), Alan Murrell (bass), and Jon Davies (drums), found themselves opening for visiting bands including A Teardrop Explodes, The Stranglers and Gang of Four. The song "Animalistic" topped the dance-club charts in Toronto in 1981, and was a live favourite.

Kinetic Ideals toured Canada and the US before heading to London, England, for a series of showcase gigs. While there, Jon Davies was struck by an automobile just after sound-check for a gig at the 101 Club. He did not return to Canada with the band.

In 1982, "Angular Sky" / "Fade Away" was released as a 12" but the sprawling disjointed songs did little to build an audience. A session steel drum player replaced the keyboard parts played live by Bruce PM.

Jon Davies left the band for good to join Breeding Ground and was replaced by a drum machine.

Their final release was the EP A Personal View in 1983. Pressed on white vinyl, it included "Me And The Sky", "Together", and "In A Second", songs that were more contemplative and less angry than earlier exercises in tension. The band's use of the Oberheim DMX drum machine is distinctive.

This recording was produced by Brett Wickens and engineered by Greg Roberts at Grant Avenue Studios, home of Daniel Lanois and various Brian Eno recordings.

Patrick Duffy was recruited as a new drummer, but recordings of this lineup were not released until 2013. Kinetic Ideals disbanded in 1986 after the vocalist Mikal Rulman left the band. The others continued as First Man Over.
