= April Fool (song) =

Single by Chalk Circle

from the album The Great Lake
- Released: 1986
- Recorded: 1986
- Genre: Post-punk, rock
- Length: 5:20
- Label: Duke Street
- Songwriters: Chalk Circle, Chris Tait
- Producer: Chris Wardman

Chalk Circle singles chronology
"The World" (1985)	"April Fool" (1986)	"Me, Myself and I" (1986)

"April Fool" (1986) is the second single from Canadian band Chalk Circle and the first from their debut EP, The Great Lake. Thirty years after its release, the song was received renewed popularity and was played on the radio once a day on Boom FM.

The original track was available on 7" and 12" singles. The 12" featured two remixes of the A-side as well as a remix of third single "Me, myself & I", which are still unavailable on CD.

== Track listing ==
All tracks are written by Chalk Circle.

Side one
No.	Title	Length
1.	"April Fool"	3:56

Side two
No.	Title	Length
2.	"Big White Clouds (Acoustic mix)"	2:48

== Track listing ==
All tracks are written by Chalk Circle.

Side A
No.	Title	Length
1.	"April Fool (April 1st)"	5:31

Side B
No.	Title	Length
1.	"April Fool (April 2nd)"	6:28
2.	"Me, myself & I (Precious mix)"	4:08

== Credits ==
=== Personnel ===
- Chris Tait - vocals, guitars
- Brad Hopkins - bass guitars
- Derrick Murphy - drums
- Tad Winklarz - keyboards, saxophone
- Patrick Miles - Lead guitars, acoustic guitar

=== Production ===
- Chris Wardman - producer, arranger
- Ron Searles - engineer
- Paul Lachapelle - engineer
- Howie Weinberg - mastering as Masterdisk, New York City
