= Mending Wall (album) =

Studio album by Chalk Circle
- Released: 1987
- Recorded: 1986–1987
- Genre: Rock
- Length: 42:51
- Label: Duke Street
- Producer: Chris Wardman

Chalk Circle chronology
| The Great Lake EP (1986) | Mending Wall (1987) | As the Crow Flies (1989) |

Mending Wall is the first album by the Canadian band Chalk Circle, released in 1987 on Duke Street Records. The band supported the album by touring with Crowded House. Mending Wall sold more than 50,000 copies before the end of 1987.

A reissue of the album included a cover of T-Rex's "20th Century Boy", which was released as a single. The subsequent reissue of The Great Lake EP, in 1988, also included the track as one of the bonus cuts.

== Production ==
The album was named after a Robert Frost poem. It was produced by Chris Wardman. "This Mourning" deals with nuclear annihilation, while "N.I.M.B.Y" (Not In My Back Yard) is about environmental issues. Frontman Chris Tait thought that the album failed to show the band's live sound.

== Critical reception ==
Professional ratings
Review scores
| Source | Rating |
|---|---|
| AllMusic | 2.5/5 stars |

The Ottawa Citizen wrote that "these are textured songs, rich in atmosphere... There are fluid guitar lines; a mixture of acoustic and electronic; a meeting of rock and folk." The Kingston Whig-Standard determined that "Tait has a British synth-band voice, but it's perfectly tailored to this kind of music." The Globe and Mail noted the "borrowed British post-punk moodiness."

== Track listing ==
CD: Duke Street Records / DSRD-31035 (Canada)

1. "This Mourning"
2. "My Artificial Sweetener"
3. "What Counts"
4. "N.I.M.B.Y."
5. "Empty Park"
6. "Hands"
7. "Park Island"
8. "Village"
9. "Who Can Say"

CD: Duke Street Records / DSMD-31035 (Canada)

1. "This Mourning"
2. "My Artificial Sweetener"
3. "What Counts"
4. "N.I.M.B.Y."
5. "20th Century Boy"
6. "Empty Park"
7. "Hands"
8. "Park Island"
9. "Village"
10. "Who Can Say"
- 1987 reissue adds "20th Century Boy"

== Singles ==
- "This Mourning"
- "20th Century Boy"
- "N.I.M.B.Y"
