= Art Bergmann (album) =

Studio album by Art Bergmann
- Released: 1991
- Recorded: Manta Sound
- Genre: Alternative rock
- Length: 40:22
- Label: Polygram Records
- Producer: Chris Wardman

Art Bergmann chronology
Sexual Roulette (1990)	Art Bergmann (1991)	What Fresh Hell Is This? (1995)

Art Bergmann is the third studio album by Art Bergmann, released in 1991 on Polygram Records.

The album included the singles "Faithlessly Yours", "If She Could Sing" and "Message from Paul". "Faithlessly Yours" peaked at #11 on RPM's rock charts, and at #50 in the magazine's general RPM100. "If She Could Sing" peaked at #63 in the RPM100. "Message from Paul", a song about an obsessive Paul Westerberg fan, charted at rock radio but did not cross over to the mainstream charts.

In 2017, Bergmann released a remastered edition of the album under the new title Remember Her Name.

== Track listing ==
All songs written by Art Bergmann except where noted.

No.	Title	Writer(s)	Length
1.	"Remember Her Name"		5:05
2.	"American Wife"	Art Bergmann, Jamey Koch	4:22
3.	"Message From Paul"		4:08
4.	"Faithlessly Yours"		3:44
5.	"Crackin' Up"		4:28
6.	"If She Could Sing"		3:28
7.	"Baby Needs Oil"		3:42
8.	"I Can't Change This World"		3:57
9.	"Ruin My Life"		3:07
10.	"God's Little Gift"		4:21
