= Sexual Roulette =

Studio album by Art Bergmann
- Released: 1990
- Genre: Alternative rock
- Length: 46:20
- Label: Duke Street
- Producer: Chris Wardman

Art Bergmann chronology
Crawl with Me (1988)	Sexual Roulette (1990)	Art Bergmann (1991)

Sexual Roulette is the second studio album by Art Bergmann, released in 1990 on Duke Street Records.

The album's title track is a song about HIV/AIDS. The album's most successful single was "Bound for Vegas", which received wide airplay on Canadian rock radio stations.

The album was favourably reviewed by music critics, with many calling it a much stronger album than Crawl with Me. It was named as one of the year's best albums by numerous critics, including John Mackie and Greg Potter of the Vancouver Sun, Tom Harrison of The Province and Mark Lepage of the Montreal Gazette. Lepage wrote that "there's a drunkard, a wife-beater or a psycho on every big-city street, and Vancouver's Art Bergmann writes and sings as if he's met them all", and Potter described the album as "Art Bergmann in Paul Westerbergish form" while simultaneously describing The Replacements' album All Shook Down as "Paul Westerberg in Art Bergmannish form".

== Track listing ==
No.	Title	Length
1.	"Bound for Vegas"	3:18
2.	"Sexual Roulette"	5:04
3.	"Bar of Pain"	3:31
4.	"Hospital Song"	3:43
5.	"Sleep"	4:40
6.	"Dirge No. 1"	6:19
7.	"Swamp Food Thing"	3:05
8.	"Gambol"	3:48
9.	"SheHit Me"	4:11
10.	"More Blue Shock"	4:37
11.	"Deathwatch"	4:04
