= Crawl with Me =

Studio album by Art Bergmann
- Released: July 5, 1988
- Genre: Alternative rock
- Length: 48:48
- Label: Duke Street
- Producer: John Cale

Art Bergmann chronology
Crawl with Me (1988)	Sexual Roulette (1990)

Crawl with Me is the debut solo studio album by Art Bergmann, released July 5, 1988 on Duke Street Records.

The album had originally been recorded in demo form by Bob Rock and Paul Hyde, but the studio release was produced by John Cale. The album received generally favourable reviews, although critics noted that Cale's production had toned down Bergmann's signature guitar sound in favour of a more keyboard-oriented production.

At the Juno Awards of 1989, Bergmann was nominated for Most Promising Male Vocalist, and James O'Mara and Kate Ryan were nominated for Best Music Video for Bergmann's "Our Little Secret".

In 2009, Bergmann's bassist Ray Fulber remastered the original Rock and Hyde demos for release as the album Lost Art Bergmann.

== Track listing ==
All songs written by Art Bergmann except where noted.

No.	Title	Writer(s)	Length
1.	"My Empty House"		4:09
2.	"Our Little Secret"		4:36
3.	"(We Want) The Most Wanted Man in Town"		4:30
4.	"Don't Be Late"		4:10
5.	"Runaway Train"	Art Bergmann, Gordon Nicholl	4:13
6.	"Final Cliché"		3:48
7.	"Crawl With Me"		4:21
8.	"The Junkie Don't Care"	Bergmann, Nicholl	4:55
9.	"Ill Repute"		6:00
10.	"Inside Your Love"		3:46
11.	"Charity"		4:20
