= Sherry Kean =

- Born: Sherry Huffman
- Origin: Toronto, Ontario, Canada
- Genres: Pop/Country
- Occupation: Singer
- Years active: 1983–1989
- Label: Capitol-EMI

Sherry Kean (born Sherry Huffman) is a former Canadian pop and country singer, who had a Canadian Top 40 hit in 1984 with "I Want You Back".

== Career ==
Kean was originally the lead vocalist for a Toronto band called The Sharks, consisting of herself, David Baxter, Bazil Donovan and Cleave Anderson. The band released only one single before Kean left to pursue a solo career. Baxter joined Kean's solo band, while Donovan and Anderson went on to join Blue Rodeo.

Kean performed backing vocals on ‘’Chinese Graffiti’’ by Blue Peter in 1981.

Kean signed to Capitol-EMI, and released the EP Mixed Emotions in 1983. The single "I Want You Back" was released in early 1984 and became a hit; it was followed by her full-length album debut, People Talk (Capitol ST-12328), later that year. Kean won the Juno Award for Most Promising Female Vocalist at the 1984 Juno Awards, and was also nominated for Female Vocalist of the Year at the U-Knows. "Would You Miss Me?" was also released as a single, but did not replicate the chart success of "I Want You Back".

Kean later released the country album Maverick Heart in 1987, which earned her another Juno Award nomination for Country Female Vocalist of the Year at the 1989 Juno Awards.

Kean left the music industry and had been a tour guide at the McCulloch Heritage Centre in Pictou, Nova Scotia.

== Personal life ==
She was married to musician David Baxter, and they shared a son, Sergei. Although they remained legally married until his death, they had also been separated. Baxter died in 2023.

== Discography ==
=== Albums ===
Year	Album	CAN
1983	Mixed Emotions (EP)	—
1984	People Talk	57
1987	Maverick Heart	—

=== Singles ===
Year	Single	Chart Positions			Album
Year	Single	CAN	CAN AC	CAN Country	Album
1984	"I Want You Back"	19	—	—	People Talk
1984	"Would You Miss Me"	93	—	—	People Talk
1988	"Diamonds & Pearls"	—	6	50	Maverick Heart
