= Sandra Shamas =

Canadian comedian (born 1957)

- Born: 1957; Sudbury, Ontario
- Occupations: Comedian, writer
- Writing career
- Period: 20th century, 21st century
- Genre: non-fiction

Sandra Shamas (born 1957) is a Canadian puppeteer, comedic actress, writer, director and producer.

== Biography ==
Shamas was born in Sudbury, Ontario to Lebanese parents. She moved to Toronto in 1980, where she held a variety of jobs before a workshop at The Second City inspired her to pursue a career in performing arts. She acted with Second City and Theatresports, and worked as a puppeteer on the children's series Fraggle Rock before deciding to strike out on her own.

In 1987, she premiered her first show, My Boyfriend's Back and There's Gonna Be Laundry at the Edmonton Fringe Festival. The show, a mixture of personal stories drawn from her own life and observational humour about dating and relationships, was a smash hit of the festival, and soon Shamas was on tour performing the show across the country. In 1989, she began performing the sequel, My Boyfriend's Back and There's Gonna Be Laundry II: The Cycle Continues. A third show, Wedding Bell Hell, dealing with wedding rituals such as the bridal shower and selection of the wedding rings and dress, made its debut in 1991. In 1993, she took Laundry to the Old Vic Theatre in London for her first performance outside Canada, and was well received by the British audience and critics.

After some time away from the spotlight, Shamas returned with a new series of shows, Wit's End, Wit's End II...Heart's Desire, and Wit's End III...Love Life. These shows revolved around her move to the country after buying a farm in Southern Ontario.

Shamas has been nominated for the Governor General's Award and the Stephen Leacock Award for the Laundry trilogy. She won a Gemini Award in 1991 for Best Performance in Comedy, and won the Best Theatre Award at the U.S. Comedy Arts Festival in March 2003.

Shamas' play The Big What Now premiered in 2017 at the Harbourfront Centre in Toronto. The Big What Now is about menopause and being a woman over the age of 50.

In January 2018, Shamas was appointed to the Order of Ontario.

== Books ==
- Sandra Shamas: a trilogy of performances (Mercury Press, 1997)
- Wit's end (Mercury Press, 2002)
