= Design Flaw =

Studio album by Art Bergmann
- Released: May 26, 1998
- Genre: Alternative rock
- Length: 47:28
- Label: Other People's Music
- Producer: Peter J. Moore

Art Bergmann chronology
What Fresh Hell Is This? (1995)	Design Flaw (1998)	Vultura Freeway (2000)

Design Flaw is the fifth studio album by Art Bergmann, released on the Other People's Music record label in 1998. The album featured acoustic recordings of songs, primarily from Bergmann's prior albums but also including a new Gram Parsons cover.

Calgary Herald music critic James Muretich named the album as one of the year's best, writing that "one of our best singer-songwriters of the last 20 years brilliantly delves into his repertoire of songs dealing with desire, drugs and dreams."

Bergmann's next release, 2000's Vultura Freeway, comprised unreleased recordings from the early 1980s. He did not release another newly recorded title until 2014's Songs for the Underclass.

== Track listing ==
All songs written by Art Bergmann except where noted.

No.	Title	Writer(s)	Length
1.	"Our Little Secret"		4:27
2.	"Crawl With Me"		5:26
3.	"Please Don't Be Late"		3:26
4.	"Hospital Song"		4:13
5.	"Sin City"	Gram Parsons, Chris Hillman	3:39
6.	"Faithlessly Yours"		3:47
7.	"Buried Alive"		3:27
8.	"She Hit Me"		3:46
9.	"More Blue Shock"		4:51
10.	"If She Could Sing"		3:32
11.	"Dive"		4:13
12.	"Hung out to Dry"		2:41
