= Laura Hubert =

Canadian rock and jazz singer

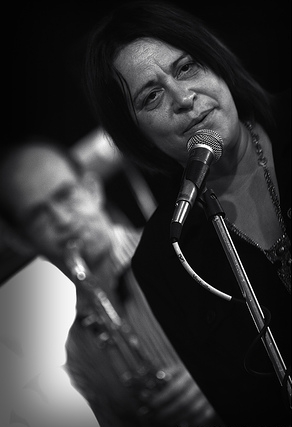
- Photo by James W. Dawson

Background information
- Born: Toronto, Ontario, Canada
- Genres: Alternative rock, jazz
- Occupation: Musician
- Instrument: Vocals
- Years active: 1980s–present

Laura Hubert is a Canadian rock and jazz singer. She was the lead vocalist for the alternative rock group Leslie Spit Treeo in the 1980s and 1990s, and has subsequently released three solo jazz CDs.

== Discography ==
- My Girlish Ways (2001)
- Live at the Rex (2002)
- Half Bridled (2004)
