= Scott B. Sympathy =

- Born: Scott Bradshaw
- Origin: Canada
- Genres: Indie rock Alternative country
- Occupation: singer-songwriter
- Years active: 1990–present
- Label: Ruffianrecords

Scott Bradshaw, who records as Scott B. Sympathy, is a Canadian indie rock and alternative country musician. He released several albums with his eponymously named band in the 1990s, and subsequently became a member of Stratochief following the 1999 death of that band's singer Greg McConnell.

== Background ==
Originally from Brantford, Ontario, Bradshaw moved to Toronto at age 20. He began performing on the Queen Street West club scene in the 1980s, both as a solo artist under the name Scott B. and with the band Scott B. Sympathy. The name "Scott B. Sympathy" was originally intended as the name of the band, with his own stage name simply being "Scott B." However, this was so frequently misunderstood by fans and music journalists that when crediting the band's 1996 album Long Way Down to "The Sympathy" still failed to resolve the confusion, Bradshaw eventually relented and adopted "Scott B. Sympathy" as his own stage name.

== Career ==
The band began as a regular act at Elvis Mondays, a regular alternative rock club night in Toronto organized by William New; Bradshaw also played as a supporting musician in New's own band Groovy Religion. The band's debut album, 1990s Neil Yonge Street, was titled with a pun combining Toronto's Yonge Street with the name of one of Bradshaw's idols, Neil Young. At this time the band had a rotating lineup, with Bradshaw as the only consistent member; Neil Yonge Street included contributions from Ian Blurton, Gord Cumming, Terry Carter, Don Kerr, Mike Duggan, Alisdair Jones, John Borra and Willie P. Bennett.

The band followed up with Drinking with the Poet in 1993, garnering radio airplay on alternative rock and campus radio stations and MuchMusic with the album's title track. By this time the band had a more stable lineup, including guitarist Gary Robertson, bassist Ron Bock and drummer Dave O'Sullivan. The same lineup remained in place for the band's 1996 album Long Way Down, which was credited to The Sympathy.

The band's final album, Unfinished Sympathy, was again titled with a pun, referencing Schubert's famous "Unfinished Symphony". (The album title bears no relation to Massive Attack's 1991 single "Unfinished Sympathy", which Bradshaw was unaware of at the time of the album's release.) The album included contributions from Ashley MacIsaac, Bazil Donovan, Tyler Yarema, Michelle Josef, Oh Susanna and Cindy Church.

Following the band's breakup and McConnell's death, Bradshaw joined Stratochief for a number of years, recording two albums with that band.

In 2010, he was playing in a duo with Cumming under the name "Massey Harris".

== Discography ==
=== Albums ===
- Neil Yonge Street (1990)
- Drinking With the Poet (1993)
- Long Way Down (1996), as The Sympathy
- Unfinished Sympathy (1999)
- Home Movies (2006), as Scott Bradshaw

=== Other Releases ===
- El Seven Nightclub (Big Sugar, 1993), track 13: "Sitting On Top Of The World", as Scott B.
- Elvis Monday Vol. 1 (Various Artists, 1994), track 5: "Distress"
- Changed: A Tribute To Change of Heart (Various Artists, 2001), track 5: "Winter's Over"

=== Stratochief ===
- Turbines for Speed (2001)
- In Search of the Seven Foot Woman (2002)

=== Massey Harris ===
- Massey-Harris (2020) EP
