= Handsome Boy Records =

- Founded: 1994
- Founder: Jeff Rogers
- Status: active
- Distributor(s): BMG
- Country of origin: Canada

Handsome Boy Records was a Canadian independent record label founded in 1994 in Toronto. It was distributed by BMG Music in Canada, and by other labels internationally including Atlantic Records.

== Background ==
Handsome Boy is owned by Jeff Rogers, a former manager of the band Crash Test Dummies. After the Dummies achieved international success with their album God Shuffled His Feet, Handsome Boy was formed in 1994, with its first release being One Free Fall's Mud Creek. Initially the label was self-distributed by the staff of Rogers's management company Swell.

Within less than a year, however, One Free Fall broke up and reformed as Rusty, who achieved greater success.

This led Handsome Boy to signing more artists, many of which were discovered through "Elvis Mondays" nights at Toronto's El Mocambo nightclub. Other artists who released material on Handsome Boy included hHead, Groovy Religion, Meryn Cadell, The Monoxides, Malcolm Burn, John Oswald and Slowburn. The label also released the soundtrack to Jeremy Podeswa's film Eclipse.

Through the 2000s, the label stopped releasing new material, although it remained in business as a "catalogue" label of its earlier releases while Rogers worked for Richard Branson and focused on tech, film and television projects. It did not release a new record until Street Pharmacy's album Divorce in 2012.
