= Chris Tait =

Canadian singer–songwriter and producer

Chris Tait is a Canadian singer–songwriter and producer, best known as the lead singer and guitarist for the rock band Chalk Circle and later the group Big Faith.

== Music career ==
=== Chalk Circle ===
Tait grew up in Newcastle, Ontario and his first band was called "The Casualties". After a few years in various bands he formed the group Chalk Circle (named after Bertolt Brecht's play The Caucasian Chalk Circle) with Brad Hopkins on bass and Derrick Murphy on drums. The new band recorded a demo single "The World" and played around Toronto, eventually winning a CASBY Award for "Most Promising Non-Recording Group" in 1985.

Chalk Circle signed a recording deal with Duke Street Records and released three albums with Tait on lead vocals and guitar: The Great Lake (1986), Mending Wall (1987) and As the Crow Flies (1989). The band had a Top 10 hit in Canada with their first single "April Fool" and another Canadian hit with their cover of T.Rex's "20th Century Boy".

In 2006, Tait and Chalk Circle briefly reunited for the release of their greatest hits collection.

=== Big Faith ===
After Chalk Circle broke up around 1990, Tait formed the group Big Faith with Ken Greer, Fergus Marsh and Mike Sloski.

Big Faith released two independent albums, Grounded in 1992 and Undertow in 1994, but saw less commercial success than Chalk Circle, and subsequently broke up.

=== Other projects ===
After the breakup of Big Faith, Tait pursued a career in advertising and promotion with a company that produced jingles. Tait has written music for various ads including the BMW MINI when it was re-launched in Canada in 2002.

In 2003, Tait released a solo album entitled Hello… my name is Chris Tait, which he produced independently in Canada. In 2004, he wrote a song titled "A Little Music" for the annual Coalition For Music Education in Canada promotion "Music Monday". That same year, Tait co-wrote and produced a demo for the band Oliver Black.

== Discography ==
With Chalk Circle:

- The Great Lake (EP) - 1986
- Mending Wall - 1987
- As the Crow Flies - 1989
- The Best of Chalk Circle - 2006

With Big Faith:

- Grounded - 1992
- Undertow - 1994

Solo:

- Hello… my name is Chris Tait - 2003
