= Battered Wives =

Canadian punk rock band

- Also known as: The Wives
- Origin: Toronto, Ontario, Canada
- Genre: Punk rock
- Years active: 1976–1980
- Labels: Bomb Records, Epic Records, Ready Records
- Past members: Toby Swann; Colin Fox; Robert Stewart; Larry Klassen; John Gibb; Cleave Anderson; Patrick Mooney

Battered Wives, aka The Wives was a Canadian punk rock band from Toronto, Ontario, Canada active during the late 1970s.

== History ==
The group got together on Toronto's Queen Street West. It originally consisted of Toby Swann (guitar, vocals), Colin Fox (drums), and Robert Stewart (bass, vocals). The group made a point of playing as loudly as possible. Fox was American; when he was arrested on drug charges, he was deported. The band fell apart, but Swann reformed it with a new line-up.

The reformed Battered Wives, consisting of Toby Swann (guitar and vocals), Larry "Jasper" Klassen (bass and vocals), John Gibb (guitar) and Cleave Anderson (drums), released their first album, Battered Wives in 1978. This spawned the hit singles "Daredevil", "Suicide", "Lover's Balls", and "Uganda Stomp (Bomp Idi Bomp)", which poked fun at the Ugandan dictator Idi Amin. Despite their name, and the fact that women's groups were picketing their concerts, the album sold 50,000 copies in Canada and was certified gold.

Anderson was averse to the negative attention and left the band; he was replaced by drummer Patrick Mooney. In 1979, the band released their second album, Cigarettes, as 'The Wives'. By now, there was considerable heat surrounding their name—and their logo, which was a clenched fist with the lipstick impression of a bleeding mouth. The group Women Against Violence Against Women had already picketed a record store that was selling their albums; when the band's 13-city tour with Elvis Costello and The Attractions was announced, the group booked a demonstration at Toronto's O'Keefe Centre and the band's manager claimed that they had received death threats. Under the adjusted name, the tour went ahead without incident. The most notable song from Cigarettes was "New Wave Robot". For his work on Cigarettes, the designer Rodney Bowes won a Juno for Best Album Graphics at the Juno Awards of 1980.

In 1978, a benefit concert named "Rock Against Repression" was organised by the Battered Wives with proceeds split between the CCLA and Ontario Libertarian Party.

The band released Live On Mother's Day in 1980, with the word 'Battered' inserted back into their name. This album was marred with lawsuits from various parties and did not really see the light of day. Then the group broke up.

Anderson became the drummer for Blue Rodeo. Swann went solo, releasing a cover of "Over the Rainbow" on his 1981 album Lullabies in Razorland. Klassen was working as recording artist in Toronto; he died on Thursday, December 8, 2016, at the age of 63.

== Discography ==
- Battered Wives (1978), Bomb Records
- Cigarettes (1980), Bomb Records, Epic Records
- Live On Mother's Day (1980), Ready Records
