= Bob Snider =

Canadian singer/songwriter

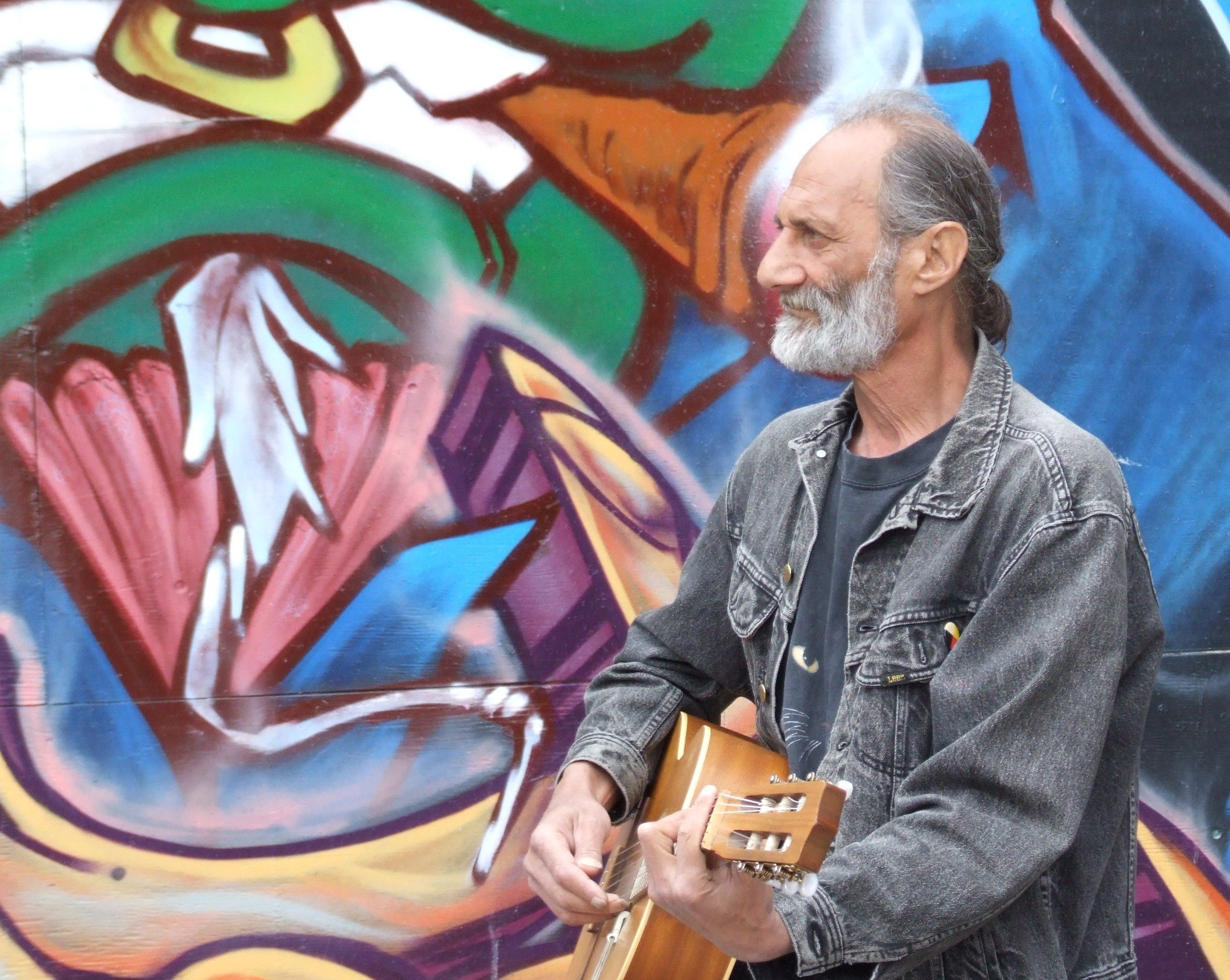
- Snider performing in Kensington Market, Toronto, Ontario, Canada

Background information
- Origin: Toronto, Ontario, Canada
- Genres: Folk
- Occupation: Singer-songwriter

Bob Snider is a Canadian singer/songwriter.

Snider grew up in Toronto and later moved to Bear River, Nova Scotia, Canada. Upon returning to Toronto in the 1980s, he befriended Bob Wiseman and other songwriters in the Toronto open stages at Fat Albert's coffee house. The Leslie Spit Treeo, Ron Sexsmith and Kyp Harness were notable friends. Bob Wiseman produced and arranged the debut record entitled You which garnered attention far and wide leading to a deal with EMI. A folk musician, Snider plays almost exclusively songs he has written himself, although notable exception was at the Bear River Reunion, where he played a cover of an old blues tune. Snider's songs have been covered by Ashley MacIsaac, Meryn Cadell and the Leslie Spit Treeo. Moxy Früvous has also covered Ash Hash on The 'b' Album. Over the years he could often be found busking in Toronto's Kensington Market district. In 2009, he relocated permanently to Bear River, Nova Scotia. His daughter, fabric artist/ designer Sarah Snider also lives there.

== Discography ==
- You (1989)
- Live at the Free Times Cafe (1989)
- Caterwaul & Doggerel (1995)
- Poetreason: The Songs of Bob Snider (1996)
- Words and Pictures (1997)
- Stealin' Home (2002)
- The Street Takes you In (2007)
- A Maze In Greys (2008)
