= Paul Humphrey (Canadian musician) =

Canadian singer-songwriter and musician (1959–2021)

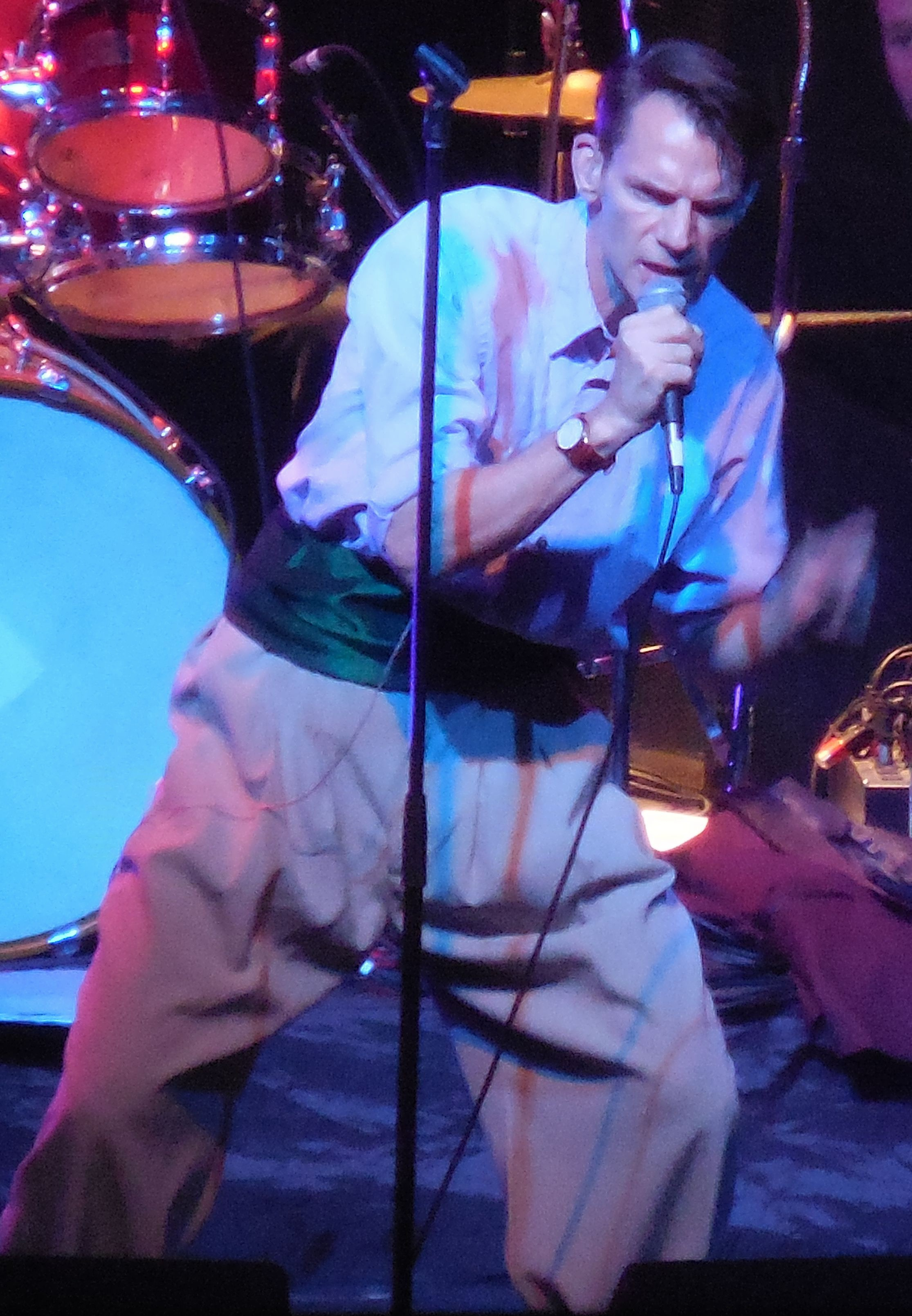
- Paul Humphrey fronting Blue Peter at the Phoenix Concert Theatre, 2015

Background information
- Born: September 22, 1959; Vancouver, British Columbia
- Died: April 4, 2021 (aged 61)
- Genres: New wave, pop, rock
- Occupation: Singer-songwriter
- Instruments: Vocals, keyboards, piano, guitar
- Years active: 1978–2021
- Label: Ready Records
- Formerly of: Blue Peter, Broken Arrow
- Website: PaulHumphrey.org

Paul Humphrey (22 September 1959 – 4 April 2021) was a Canadian singer-songwriter and musician who played keyboards and guitar and was best known as the lead singer for the 1980s Canadian new wave band Blue Peter. Humphrey had also been the leader of The Paul Humphrey Band, The Monkey Tree, and Broken Arrow.

== Blue Peter ==
Blue Peter was founded by Humphrey and Chris Wardman in the late 1970s when they were high school students. After attending York University, Humphrey dropped out of the theatre program to pursue music full time.

Humphrey sang lead, and was known for his low-timbred singing, compared at times to that of David Bowie and Bryan Ferry, as well as his "suave" looks and dancing style. His band mate Geoff McOuat credited the singer as being influenced by Frank Sinatra, Elvis Presley and elements of film noir.

While a member of Blue Peter, he earned the Male Vocalist of the Year award at 1984's CASBY Awards (then known as The U-Knows), held by CFNY radio in Toronto. Humphrey and Blue Peter performed shows occasionally, often as part of "retro" events, such as the Juno Awards 40th Anniversary Concert Series held at the Horseshoe Tavern in January 2011.

== Solo career ==
After stints with The Paul Humphrey Band and Monkey Tree, Humphrey formed Broken Arrow with Blue Peter bass player Ric Joudrey in 1997. Broken Arrow recorded and released two CDs, Bend (1997), and Four Ways to Centre (2000).

In 2007, Humphrey released a solo album, A Rumour of Angels, which he recorded with the Vancouver Symphony Orchestra. John Sakamoto selected People Let You Down from this album for mention in his Anti-Hit List in 2007, noting that the album's style was a significant departure from Humphrey's musical past. In 2008, Humphrey contributed vocals to Your Flight Tonight on ProCon's album Kingmaker.

== Personal life ==
Humphrey was born in Vancouver. He came from a musical family, and had three brothers who are also professional musicians; actor Mark Humphrey is a drummer, John Humphrey plays bass, and Andy Humphrey is a singer-songwriter/guitarist. His sister Lesley has modeled extensively. Early in his career Humphrey also made acting appearances in a few television series, including Friday the 13th: The Series and Captain Power and the Soldiers of the Future. Humphrey died at the age of 61 on April 4, 2021, after a long battle with multiple system atrophy, a rare degenerative disorder.
