= Meryn Cadell =

Canadian writer and performance artist

- Born: Brooklyn, New York, U.S.
- Occupations: Writer; Performance artist

Academic background
- Education: Ontario College of Art and Design

Academic work
- Discipline: Creative Writing (Song Lyrics and Libretto Writing)
- Institutions: University of British Columbia

Meryn Cadell is an American-Canadian writer and performance artist. He is an assistant professor of song lyrics and libretto writing in the Creative Writing Program at University of British Columbia.

== Early life and education ==
Cadell was born in Brooklyn, New York, grew up in Waterloo, Ontario, and he later moved to Toronto in the mid-1980s. Cadell is a graduate of the Ontario College of Art and Design.

== Career ==
Cadell re-released an independent cassette titled Mare-In Ka-Dell in 1988 while active as a performance artist in Toronto's Queen Street West scene. As a performance artist, he was particularly known for performing with a heating duct to add reverb.

Cadell soon signed to Intrepid Records, and recorded with Jim Creeggan of Barenaked Ladies, Bob Wiseman and members of Rheostatics. Those sessions were released in 1991 as the album Angel Food for Thought, whose first single "The Sweater" became a surprise hit in Canada in 1992 and was very popular on college radio and alternative stations in the United States. "The Sweater" is a spoken word monologue with a musical backing track—a remixed sample of Syd Dale’s jazzy instrumental track “Walk and Talk”. The monologue revolves around a girl's thoughts about a boy's sweater. Canadian figure skater Josée Chouinard performed a memorable, high-scoring routine to "The Sweater" at the 1997 Ladies' Professional Championships final in Pensacola, Florida.

In 1993, Cadell released a follow-up album, Bombazine, on Sire Records. This album featured guest appearances by Rheostatics, Ben Mink, Tyler Stewart, Anne Bourne and John Alcorn. Following the album, he took a hiatus from music to do human rights work with PEN Canada. Cadell also wrote an independent film, which was never produced.

In 1997, Cadell returned to music with the album 6 Blocks on the independent label Handsome Boy Records. Guest performers on this outing included Anne Bourne, Mary Margaret O'Hara, Chris Wardman and Jason Sniderman (Blue Peter), Paul Brennan (Odds) and Martin Tielli.

Following that album, Cadell retired from the music business. He then publicly came out as transgender on Bill Richardson's CBC Radio One program Bunny Watson on October 2, 2004, although Cadell had already been out to friends and family for a year.

In 2007, Bongo Beat released an expanded edition of Angel Food for Thought, including two tracks that were previously available only on cassette as well as the video for "The Sweater". The CD was remastered by Graemme Brown. Cadell is also known for the Christmas song "The Cat Carol".

== Personal life ==
Cadell is a transgender man who transitioned in 2003. In 2014 Cadell married composer Ian McAndrew. They live in Toronto, Canada.

== Discography ==
- MARE-in ka-DELL (1988)
- Angel Food for Thought (1991)
- "Barbie" (1992)
- Bombazine (1993)
- 6 Blocks (1997)
- Angel Food for Thought [bonus tracks] (2007)
