= Blue Peter (band) =

Canadian synthpop band founded 1978

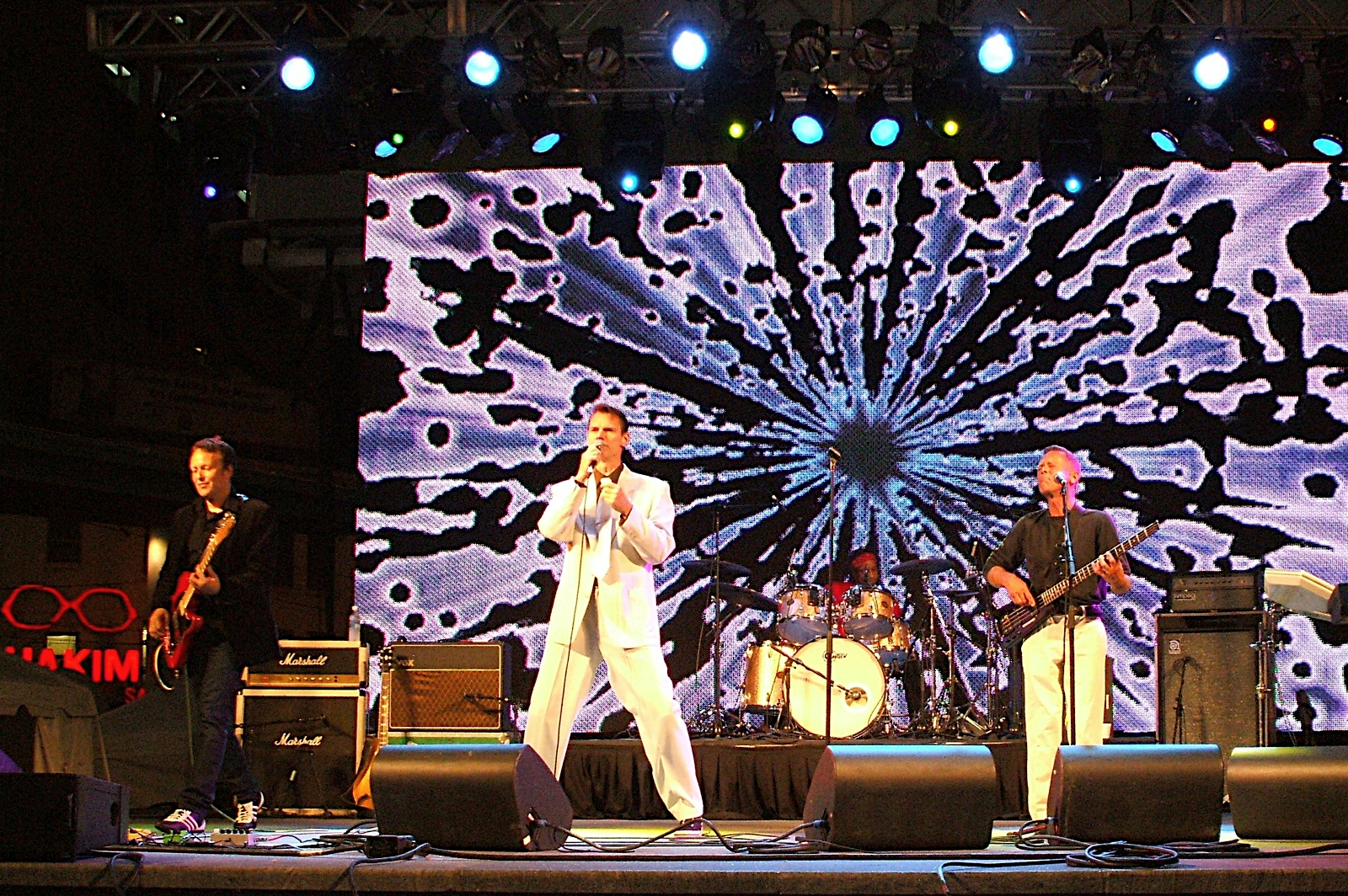
- Blue Peter in concert in September 2009

Background information
- Origin: Toronto, Ontario, Canada
- Genres: Rock, new wave, synthpop, alternative rock, pop rock
- Years active: 1978–1985, 2006–2011
- Labels: Ready Records, Universal Records
- Past members: Paul Humphrey; Rick Joudrey; Jason Sniderman; Owen Tennyson; Chris Wardman; Mike Bambrick; Geoff McOuat; Ron Tomlinson
- Website: bluepeterband.com

Blue Peter was a Canadian new wave synthpop band founded in 1978 in Markham, Ontario, by Chris Wardman and Paul Humphrey. In their heyday, Blue Peter opened for major international acts such as the Police and Simple Minds. The video for "Don't Walk Past", directed by Rob Quartly, was No. 85 on MuchMusic's top videos of the century list, and was played on MTV in the United States, in spite of the lack of American record distribution for the band. Humphrey died on April 4, 2021, after a long illness.

== History ==
Blue Peter was founded by guitarist/songwriter Chris Wardman and lead singer Paul Humphrey in the late 1970s, as a high school band. The initial lineup was rounded out by bassist Geoff McOuat and drummer Ron Tomlinson; this ensemble recorded Blue Peter's first EP, Test Patterns for Living, in 1979. In 1980, Mike Bambrick replaced Tomlinson on drums, and in the same year, the band released their first full-length album, Radio Silence.

Over the next couple of years, Blue Peter ran into difficulties with record labels and management, which led to them briefly releasing material on their own label, including "Chinese Graffiti" in 1981. Around this same time, McOuat left the band and was replaced by new bassist Rick Joudrey. After a year without label representation, Blue Peter returned to Ready Records in 1982, in time to release Up To You. "Chinese Graffiti" was included on the Up To You release, and won the band a CASBY Award (then known as the "U-Knows") for Single Of The Year in 1982.

When Falling was recorded, the band was fleshed out by the addition of Jason Sniderman on keyboards, and new drummer Owen Tennyson (replacing Bambrick). The album was their most successful, and would also prove to be their last. It spawned their biggest single, "Don't Walk Past", and its companion video, which won awards including "Best Video of 1983" from the Canadian Film and Television Association. The music video, inspired by Blade Runner, was created at the insistence of the band who saw British and American artists making visuals for MTV.

Falling ranked 24th on CFNY's Top 83 of '83. "Don't Walk Past", was ranked at number 92 in CFNY's Best 102 of the Decade, published in 1990. After Falling, Blue Peter had some of the tracks, including "Don't Walk Past", remixed by engineer Kevin Doyle and released these remixes as Version in 1984. That same year, Blue Peter won another CASBY, this time for Male Vocalist of the Year, for Paul Humphrey.

Later in 1984, Blue Peter demoed several tracks for a proposed new album (tentatively entitled Vertigo), but the band broke up in 1985 before the tracks were completed or released.

In 1997, the band issued the "best-of" compilation All Through The Night, which featured one newly overdubbed and mixed track from the Vertigo demo sessions called "Equalizer".

In 2006, Blue Peter reunited for a concert to commemorate the release of The Best of Ready :: 20th Century Masters — The Millennium Collection. The following year, the band reissued their catalog as three compilation CDs. The re-release of Falling included eight of the Vertigo demos as bonus tracks.

For the next decade or so, the band played a couple of concerts a year, including appearances at the Toronto International Film Festival in 2009 to promote the movie Suck, which featured music by them on its soundtrack. In January 2011, Blue Peter performed at the Horseshoe Tavern in Toronto as part of Juno Decades: Songs of the '80s.

== Live ==
Blue Peter performed across Canada between 1979 and 1985. Some notable opening slots included the Boomtown Rats (Toronto at El Mocambo), the Jam (Toronto at the Concert Hall, and Ottawa), Simple Minds at (Massey Hall in Toronto, and Montreal) and The Police at "The Police Picnic '83" in Toronto. In 1984, the band played a sold out show at Toronto's Ontario Place Forum.

== Discography ==
=== Albums and EPs ===
- Test Patterns for Living EP (1979)
- Radio Silence (1980)
- Up to You EP (1982)
- Falling (1983)

=== Remix EP ===
- Version (1983)

=== CD compilations ===
- All Through the Night (1997)
- The Best of Blue Peter, 20th Century Masters — The Millennium Collection (2006)
- Burning Bridges (released May 8, 2007) - Up to You and Version remastered + bonus tracks
- Falling (released May 8, 2007) - Falling remastered + 8 demos for an unreleased album to be called Vertigo
- Radio Silence (released May 8, 2007) - Radio Silence and Test Patterns for Living remastered + bonus tracks

=== Compilation appearances ===
- The Best of Ready Volume 1 :: 20th Century Masters — The Millennium Collection (released 2006), Ready Records compilation
- The Best of Ready Volume 2 :: 20th Century Masters — The Millennium Collection (released 2006), Ready Records compilation
- Retro Active 4 Rare & Remixed (released 2005) includes "Don't Walk Past" (F Version Original 12")
