= Ready Records =

- Founded: 1979
- Defunct: 1985
- Genre: Electropop; Indie rock
- Country of origin: Canada
- Location: Toronto, Ontario

Ready Records was a small but influential independent record label based out of Toronto, Canada that signed a number of new wave and indie rock bands from the early to mid-1980s. Focusing primarily on local Toronto-area talent, it released 7" and 12" singles, LPs, and cassettes. Founded in 1979 by Angus MacKay and Andy Crosbie, the label existed between 1979 and 1985, when it folded.

Its best selling group was the Spoons, but other acts that had minor hits or received national attention included Blue Peter, Colin Linden, and Manteca.

As part of their 20th Century Masters series, Universal released two collections entitled Best of Ready Vol. 1 and Best of Ready Vol. 2.

== Ready Records discography ==
The following partial discography is based upon information taken from existing Ready Records releases. Where two numbers appear in brackets beside a listing, the first denotes the LP release number, and the second the cassette release number.

- Demics – Talk's Cheap 5-song EP (RR 001)
- Steve Blimkie and the Reason - I Got This Feeling 7" single (BR 002)
- Regulators - That's Right Nothing's Left 7" single (BR 003)
- 102.1 Band - Working On The Radio 7" single (BR 004)
- Blue Peter - Test Patterns for Living 7-song EP (RR 005)
- Steve Blimkie and the Reason - Blimkie (BR 006)
- Battered Wives - Live on Mother's Day (LPBR 007)
- Blue Peter - Radio Silence (LPBR 009)
- The Extras - Bit Parts (LR 010)
- Colin Linden - Live (LR 011)
- Spoons - Stick Figure Neighbourhood (LR 012)
- Santers - Shot Down in Flames (LR 014/LR4 014)
- Steve Blimkie - Chasing Paper Tigers (LR 015/LR4 015)
- Fergus Hambleton - She's on the Other Side 7" single (RR 016)
- Manteca - Manteca (LR 017/LR4 017)
- Kevin Coyne - Pointing the Finger (LR 019)
- Spoons - Nova Heart/Symmetry 12" Single (SRB 020)
- Spoons - Nova Heart 7" Single (SR 201)
- Rosetta Stone - Hiding from Love 5-song EP (ER 012)
- The Extras - Road to Zambando (LR 022/LR4 022)
- Santers - Mayday 4-song EP (ER 023)
- Fergus Hambleton - Steal This Girl 12" Single (SRB 024)
- Blue Peter - Up to You 6-song EP (ER 025)
- Spoons - Arias & Symphonies (LR 027/LR4 027)
- Spoons - Arias & Symphonies 7" single (SR 271)
- Santers - Racing Time (LR 028/LR4 028)
- Spoons - Talkback 7" single (SR 393)
- Blue Peter - "Falling" (LR034)
- Blue Peter - "Don't Walk Past" 4-track 12" single
- Blue Peter - "Version" 4-song remix EP
- Teenage Head - Teenage Head
- Teenage Head - Top Down [Live]/Picture My Face
- Teenage Head - Endless Party (Live) (RR 046)
- Spoons - Tell No Lies 12" Single (SRB 048)
- Spoons - Romantic Traffic 7" Single (SR 482)
- Gordon Deppe - Listen To The City OST (LR 053)

== See also ==
- List of record labels
