= Jason Sniderman =

Canadian musician and businessman

Jason Sniderman is a Canadian musician and businessman. He was one of the chief executives of Sam the Record Man. He also played keyboards on a number of rock music albums, performed with the band Blue Peter, and later released several albums under the name Ensign Broderick. He is also the father of Canadian musician Cos Sylvan, who has been the live bassist for Swedish rock band Ghost since 2018.

== Early life ==
Sniderman grew up in Toronto, Ontario, the son of businessman Sam Sniderman. He was involved in the music industry from childhood through the family record store.

== Music career ==
Sniderman was a keyboard player in the new wave band Blue Peter, joining towards the end of their run in 1983, in time for the recording and release of their final album, Falling. He has appeared as a guest musician on albums by other Canadian artists, including contributing keyboards on Randy Bachman's album Any Road, Chalk Circle's recording of 20th Century Boy, and recordings produced by fellow Blue Peter member Chris Wardman. He played keyboards on the albums Presto and Clockwork Angels by Rush and Don't Cry Too Hard by Leslie Spit Treeo, and played piano on 6 Blocks by Meryn Cadell.

Sniderman is an Advisory Board Member of the Canadian Songwriters Hall of Fame and plays shows with Blue Peter a few times a year.

In March 2018, Sniderman released the album Feast of Panthers under the pseudonym Ensign Broderick, a musical alter ego he had first created in childhood. By November, Sniderman had released three more albums of music recorded decades earlier, and one album of new material, Bloodcrush.

== Sam the Record Man ==
Sniderman's father, Sam Sniderman, started selling records in his brother's radio store in the 1930s. His company grew into a national chain, with a flagship store on Yonge Street in Toronto. In the 1980s and 1990s, the chain was operated by Roblan Distributors with Jason Sniderman as Vice President. Sam retired in 2000, and the majority of the chain was closed in 2001 after filing for bankruptcy. Jason Sniderman and his brother Bobby saved the store's iconic neon signs, and re-opened the Yonge St. location in 2002. An attempt at building the Sam's brand with online sales was not enough, however, with the rise of mp3 downloads and competition from chains such as HMV down the street, Sam's was forced to close in 2007.
