= Leslie Spit Treeo =

- Genres: folk rock
- Years active: 1988–2000
- Labels: Capitol Records, Page Music
- Past members: Laura Hubert; Pat Langner; J.D. Nicholsen; Tag; Vince Montagano

Leslie Spit Treeo were a Canadian folk-rock band in the 1980s and 1990s. The band took its name from the Leslie Street Spit area of Toronto Harbour.

== History ==
The band originally consisted of vocalist Laura Hubert, guitarist Pat Langner and guitarist Jack (J.D.) Nicholsen. Tag, a dog, was the band's mascot, was listed as their official manager, and was sometimes directly credited as a contributing musician as some of the band's songs incorporated Tag's barking, growling or whining into the mix. They first began rehearsing as a band on the Leslie Street Spit, a public park area where they could bring Tag. All three of the human members had a background in theatre, as either actors or writers.

They began as a street busking collective, sometimes with Graeme Kirkland contributing on drums, and won a role in Bruce McDonald's 1989 film Roadkill, playing buskers in a field performing their song "The Sound". They signed to Capitol Records and released their debut album Don't Cry Too Hard in 1990, garnering airplay on rock radio stations with a cover of John Prine's "Angel from Montgomery" and with their own original song "UFO/Catch the Highway". They subsequently won a Juno Award for Most Promising Group at the Juno Awards of 1991. Around the same time, Nicholsen had an acting role in the film Perfectly Normal.

For their follow-up album, 1992's Book of Rejection, the band brought in guests Jason Sniderman on keyboards, Frank Randazzo on bass and Joel Anderson on drums. That album included some songs from The Book of Rejection, a theatrical show the band had collaborated on with actors Daniel Brooks, Don McKellar and Tracy Wright, and included the band's biggest hit, "In Your Eyes", a Top 20 hit in the fall of 1992 which featured Randy Bachman on guitar. But they felt that they lost creative control of the recording process, and broke their seven-album recording contract.

Nicholsen left the band in 1993 to focus on his acting career, notably appearing as Val in the 1994 film The Last Supper and as Mike Lout in Jasper, Texas. With the core of the band now down to the duo of Langner and Hubert, their 1994 indie album Hell's Kitchen was initially credited to The Spits since the band were no longer a "treeo", but when initial sales were slower than expected, it was re-released under the band's original name.

In 1995, the band appeared in another McDonald film, Dance Me Outside, again playing themselves in concert.

In 1996, the band released the double album Chocolate Chip Cookies in a cookie bag package that closely resembled Chips Ahoy! packaging; after Nabisco threatened the band with a lawsuit, the band burned all the packaging in a bonfire in Toronto's High Park and created a new cookie bag that did not resemble Chips Ahoy!. They re-released the album the following year in a conventional jewel case, with Tag on the cover. For that album's supporting tour, Langner and Hubert were joined by guitarist Jason Reed, bassist Shaun Noronha and drummer Vince Montagano.

Chocolate Chip Cookies was the band's last album. Hubert has released three solo jazz recordings and is a fixture on the Toronto jazz scene. Langner is a writer. Nicholsen, who has always been credited as J.D. Nicholsen, Jack Nichols or Jack Matthews in acting roles to avoid any potential confusion with the more famous actor Jack Nicholson, continues to act and sings with The Cameron Family Singers. Tag died in 2000, and was cited as the pretext for the band's breakup.

== Discography ==
- Don't Cry Too Hard (1990)
- Book of Rejection (1992)
- Hell's Kitchen (1994)
- Chocolate Chip Cookies (1996)

== Film appearances ==
- Roadkill, 1989
- Dance Me Outside, 1995
