= Chris Wardman =

Canadian music producer, musician and songwriter

- Origin: Canada
- Occupations: Music producer, musician, songwriter
- Instrument: Guitar
- Formerly of: Blue Peter
- Website: chriswardman.com

Chris Wardman is a Canadian music producer, musician and songwriter. Wardman was a founding member of Blue Peter, and was their lead guitarist and main contributing songwriter. Wardman was also a member of Breeding Ground in the late 1980s. Wardman has been actively producing albums for many Canadian acts, including Chalk Circle, Leslie Spit Treeo, Randy Bachman, and Emm Gryner. Wardman produced two albums for Art Bergmann, including Sexual Roulette in 1990. Meryn Cadell's most recent new release, 1997's 6 Blocks, was produced by Wardman, for which he hired, among others, former bandmate Jason Sniderman, and he performed on the album as well. The Watchmen credit Wardman with discovering them while playing at the Horseshoe Tavern in Toronto, and he produced their debut album, McLaren Furnace Room, which was certified gold in Canada in 1996. In his review of the album on Allmusic, Roch Parisien complimented Wardman's mix of the album for how he balanced lead singer Danny Greaves' vocals with the music production.

Wardman played on tour with Emm Gryner in 2011.
