= Corey Hart discography =

- Studio albums: 10
- Compilation albums: 8
- Singles: 45
- Video albums: 1
- Music videos: 31

This is the discography of Canadian singer-songwriter Corey Hart.

== Albums ==
=== Studio albums ===
Title	Album details	Peak chart positions							Certifications
Title	Album details	CAN	CAN (QUE)	AUS	GER	NZ	SWE	US	Certifications
First Offense	Released: 11 November 1983; Label: Aquarius, EMI America; Formats: LP, MC	8	11	76	—	—	—	31	CAN: 3× Platinum; US: Gold
Boy in the Box	Released: 14 June 1985; Label: Aquarius, EMI America; Formats: CD, LP, MC	1	1	35	59	31	—	20	CAN: Diamond; US: Gold
Fields of Fire	Released: 16 September 1986; Label: Aquarius, EMI America; Formats: CD, LP, MC	9	3	—	—	—	45	55	CAN: 2× Platinum; US: Gold
Young Man Running	Released: 23 June 1988; Label: Aquarius, EMI-Manhattan; Formats: CD, LP, MC	11	33	—	—	—	—	121	CAN: Platinum
Bang!	Released: 22 March 1990; Label: Aquarius, EMI; Formats: CD, LP, MC	25	27	150	—	—	46	134	
Attitude & Virtue	Released: 25 April 1992; Label: Sire; Formats: CD, LP, MC	73	—	—	—	—	—	—	
Corey Hart	Released: 15 October 1996; Label: Columbia; Formats: CD, MC	34	3	—	—	—	—	—	CAN: Platinum
Jade	Released: October 1998; Label: Columbia; Formats: CD, MC	—	9	—	—	—	—	—	
Ten Thousand Horses	Released: 5 April 2014; Label: Corey Hart Productions; Formats: digital download	—	—	—	—	—	—	—	
Dreaming Time Again	Released: 3 May 2019; Label: Warner Music Canada; Formats: CD; Released digitally as a five-track EP	3	—	—	—	—	—	—	
"—" denotes releases that did not chart or were not released in that territory.

=== Compilation albums ===
Title	Album details
The Singles	Released: April 1992; Label: Aquarius, EMI; Formats: CD, MC
I Can't Help Falling in Love with You	Released: 24 November 1993; Label: EMI; Formats: CD; Japan-only release
Sunglasses at Night	Released: 1995; Label: Aquarius; Formats: CD
The Best of Corey Hart	Released: 10 April 1998; Label: EMI-Capitol Special Markets; Formats: CD, MC
Boy in the Box – Greatest Hits Collection	Released: 1999; Label: KRB Music; Formats: CD
Classic Masters	Released: March 2002; Label: Capitol; Formats: CD
Best Of	Released: November 2003; Label: Aquarius; Formats: CD
Everything in My Heart	Released: 31 May 2019; Label: Aquarius; Formats: CD, LP, digital download

== Singles ==
Title	Year	Peak chart positions										Certifications	Album
Title	Year	CAN	CAN AC	CAN (QUE)	AUS	GER	NL	NZ	US	US AC	US Main	Certifications	Album
"Ooh Baby!" (as Cory Hart) (Note: "Ooh Baby!" was written by Paul Anka and released by Hart at the age of 14 in late 1976.)	1976	—	—	—	—	—	—	—	—	—	—		Non-album single
"Sunglasses at Night"	1984	24	—	—	16	21	48	17	7	—	15		First Offense
"It Ain't Enough"	1984	71	13	38	37	—	—	—	17	19	36		First Offense
"She Got the Radio"	1984	52	—	—	—	—	—	—	—	—	—		First Offense
"Lamp at Midnite"	1985	42	—	—	—	—	—	—	—	—	—		First Offense
"Never Surrender"	1985	1	1	1	20	37	—	38	3	8	8	CAN: Platinum	Boy in the Box
"Boy in the Box"	1985	7	5	8	—	—	—	—	26	—	—	CAN: Gold	Boy in the Box
"Everything in My Heart"	1985	1	3	7	—	—	—	—	30	39	—	CAN: Gold	Boy in the Box
"Eurasian Eyes"	1986	29	—	31	—	—	—	—	—	—	—		Boy in the Box
"I Am by Your Side"	1986	12	1	8	—	—	—	—	18	—	—		Fields of Fire
"Angry Young Man" (Note: "Angry Young Man" was only released in the UK and Europe.)	1986	—	—	—	—	—	—	—	—	—	—		Fields of Fire
"Can't Help Falling in Love"	1986	1	1	10	—	—	—	—	24	24	—	CAN: Gold	Fields of Fire
"Dancin' with My Mirror"	1987	33	—	—	—	—	—	—	88	—	—		Fields of Fire
"Take My Heart"	1987	58	15	50	—	—	—	—	—	—	—		Fields of Fire
"Too Good to Be Enough"	1987	24	—	48	—	—	—	—	—	—	—		Non-album single
"In Your Soul"	1988	2	—	4	—	—	—	—	38	—	—		Young Man Running
"Spot You in a Coalmine"	1988	12	—	34	—	—	—	—	—	—	—		Young Man Running
"Still in Love"	1988	24	—	—	—	—	—	—	—	—	—		Young Man Running
"Don't Take Me to the Racetrack"	1989	— (Note: "Don't Take Me to the Racetrack" didn't enter the RPM 100 Singles, but did peak at number 25 on the Cancon 40 Singles.)	—	—	—	—	—	—	—	—	—		Young Man Running
"A Little Love"	1990	13	—	7	73	—	—	—	37	—	—		Bang!
"Bang! (Starting Over)"	1990	30	—	36	—	—	—	—	—	—	—		Bang!
"Rain on Me"	1990	72	—	—	—	—	—	—	—	—	—		Bang!
"92 Days of Rain"	1992	22	—	31	—	—	—	—	—	—	—		Attitude & Virtue
"Baby When I Call Your Name"	1992	14	22	47	139	—	—	—	—	—	—		Attitude & Virtue
"Always"	1992	30	12	—	—	—	—	—	—	—	—		Attitude & Virtue
"I Want (Cool Cool Love)" [airplay]	1993	42	28	—	—	—	—	—	—	—	—		Attitude & Virtue
"Hymn to Love" (Note: "Hymn to Love" was only released in France, Japan, Quebec and the UK.)	1994	—	—	4	—	—	—	—	—	—	—		Edith Piaf Tribute (by various artists)
"Black Cloud Rain"	1996	2	3	5	—	—	—	—	—	—	—		Corey Hart
"Tell Me" [airplay]	1997	16	4	3	—	—	—	—	—	—	—		Corey Hart
"Third of June"	1997	13	6	1	—	—	—	—	—	—	—		Corey Hart
"Someone" [airplay]	1997	—	7	40	—	—	—	—	—	—	—		Corey Hart
"Là-bas" (with Julie Masse)	1998	—	—	1	—	—	—	—	—	—	—		Jade
"So Visible (Easy to Miss)"	1998	—	24	—	—	—	—	—	—	—	—		Jade
"Break the Chain" (promo-only release)	1999	—	16	46	—	—	—	—	—	—	—		Jade
"J'aimerai te retrouver" (Meggie featuring Corey Hart)	2006	—	—	30	—	—	—	—	—	—	—		Tête première (by Meggie)
"Truth Will Set U Free" (1Love featuring Corey Hart)	2012	—	—	—	—	—	—	—	—	—	—		Non-album singles
"Night Visions (Sunglasses)" (Papercha$er featuring Corey Hart)	2013	—	—	—	—	—	—	—	—	—	—		Non-album singles
"Another December"	2018	—	14	—	—	—	—	—	—	—	—		Dreaming Time Again
"Dreaming Time Again"	2019	—	—	—	—	—	—	—	—	—	—		Dreaming Time Again
"Tonight (I Wrote You This Song)	2019	—	29	—	—	—	—	—	—	—	—		Dreaming Time Again
"Sonny's Dream" (with Alan Doyle)	2019	—	—	—	—	—	—	—	—	—	—		Dreaming Time Again
"First Rodeo" (featuring Jim Cuddy)	2020	—	—	—	—	—	—	—	—	—	—		Dreaming Time Again
"Never Surrender (Angels)"	2020	—	—	—	—	—	—	—	—	—	—		Non-album singles
"Shoreline" (featuring Dante Hart)	2021	—	—	—	—	—	—	—	—	—	—		Non-album singles
"Morning Sun"	2021	—	—	—	—	—	—	—	—	—	—		Non-album singles
"—" denotes releases that did not chart or were not released in that territory.

== Videos ==
=== Video albums ===
Title	Album details
The Complete Aquarius Years 1983–1990: Chapter I – Life Is a Video	Released: November 1998; Label: Magada Héritage International; Formats: DVD

=== Music videos ===
Title	Year	Location	Director
"Sunglasses at Night"	1984	Toronto	Rob Quartly
"It Ain't Enough"	1984	Toronto	Rob Quartly
"Never Surrender"	1985	Toronto	Rob Quartly
"Boy in the Box"	1985	London	Michael Oblowitz
"Everything in My Heart"	1985	Boston	Rob Quartly
"Eurasian Eyes"	1986	Toronto	Rob Quartly
"I Am by Your Side"	1986	Alberta	Michael Oblowitz
"Angry Young Man"	1986	Rome	Rob Quartly
"Can't Help Falling in Love"	1986	London	Rob Quartly
"Dancin' with My Mirror"	1987	Toronto	Rob Quartly
"Take My Heart"	1987	Eastern Townships	Suzanne Rostock
"Too Good to Be Enough"	1987	New Orleans	Suzanne Rostock
"In Your Soul"	1988	New Mexico & Los Angeles	Meiert Avis
"Still in Love"	1988	Montreal	Corey Hart
"Bang! (Starting Over)"	1990	Los Angeles	Meiert Avis
"A Little Love"	1990	Los Angeles	Meiert Avis
"92 Days of Rain"	1992	Toronto	Rob Quartly
"Baby When I Call Your Name"	1992	Los Angeles	Leta Warner
"Hymn to Love"	1994	Paris	Meiert Avis
"Black Cloud Rain"	1996	Mexico City	Javier Aguilera
"Tell Me"	1997	Toronto	Javier Aguilera
"Third of June"	1997	Montreal	Lynne Charlevoix
"Là-bas"	1998	Mexico City	Javier Aguilera
"So Visible (Easy to Miss)"	1998	Mexico City	Javier Aguilera
"Break the Chain"	1999	Alliston	Tryan George
"Truth Will Set U Free"	2012	Barcelona & Sitges	Meiert Avis
"Night Visions (Sunglasses)"	2013	Miami	Marc Lostracco
"Another December"	2018	Montreal	Peter Guzda
"Dreaming Time Again"	2019	Havana	Peter Guzda
"Tonight (I Wrote You This Song)	2019	Nassau	Peter Guzda
"First Rodeo"	2020	Animated clip	Josh Raskin & Justin Broadbent
"Morning Sun"	2021	Toronto	Peter Guzda
