= List of number-one singles of 1985 (Canada) =

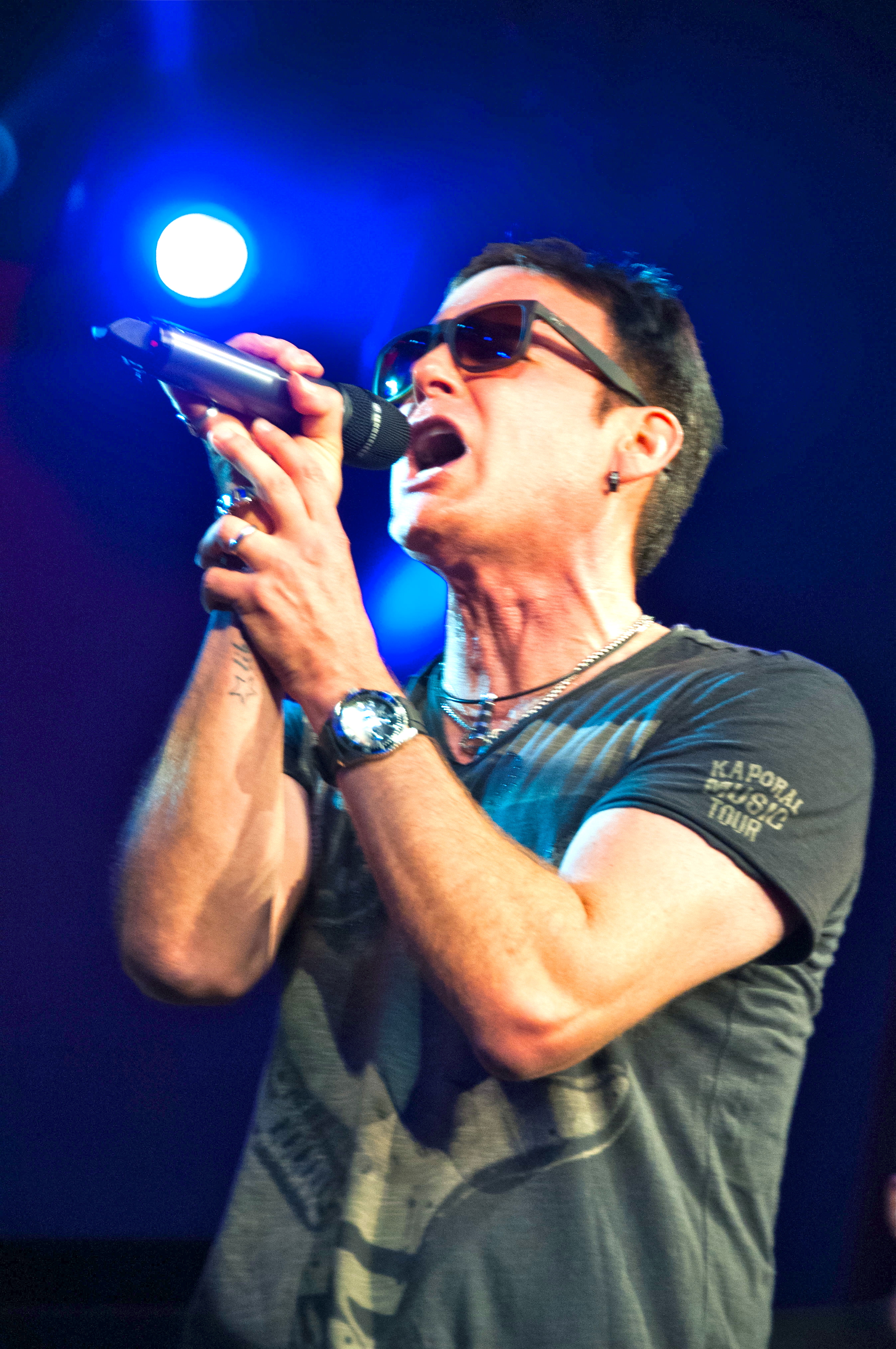
Canadian Corey Hart had the most successful record of Canada in 1985, "Never Surrender", which peaked atop the RPM Singles Chart for four weeks.

RPM was a Canadian magazine that published the best-performing singles of Canada from 1964 to 2000. Thirty-two songs peaked at number one this year, starting with "Do They Know It's Christmas?" by Band Aid and ending with "Say You, Say Me" by Lionel Richie. Not counting the number-one single from the magazine's first issue, "Do They Know It's Christmas?" was the first song to debut at number one on the RPM Singles Chart. Excluding the musical acts composing Band Aid, Northern Lights, and USA for Africa, 19 different artists reached the top spot for the first time in 1985.

This year, three artists earned more than one chart-topping single: Phil Collins, Madonna, and Tears for Fears. The three Canadian acts that peaked atop the chart in 1985 were supergroup Northern Lights, Corey Hart, and Platinum Blonde. Hart's single "Never Surrender" spent four weeks at number one and was the best-selling hit of the year. Foreigner, Tears for Fears, John Parr, and supergroup USA for Africa each topped the magazine's chart for three issues with their singles. Phil Collins spent the most weeks at number one, five, with "Easy Lover", "One More Night", and "Separate Lives".

Key
† Indicates best-performing single of 1985

== Chart history ==
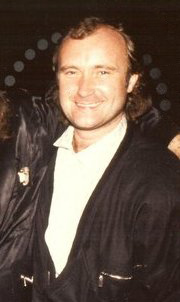
Phil Collins gained three Canadian number-one hits in 1985: "Easy Lover", "One More Night", and "Separate Lives".

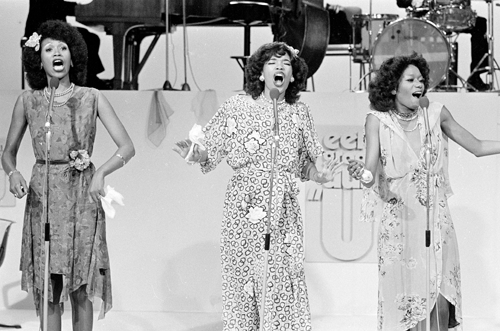
The Pointer Sisters earned their only Canadian number-one hit with "Neutron Dance" in March.

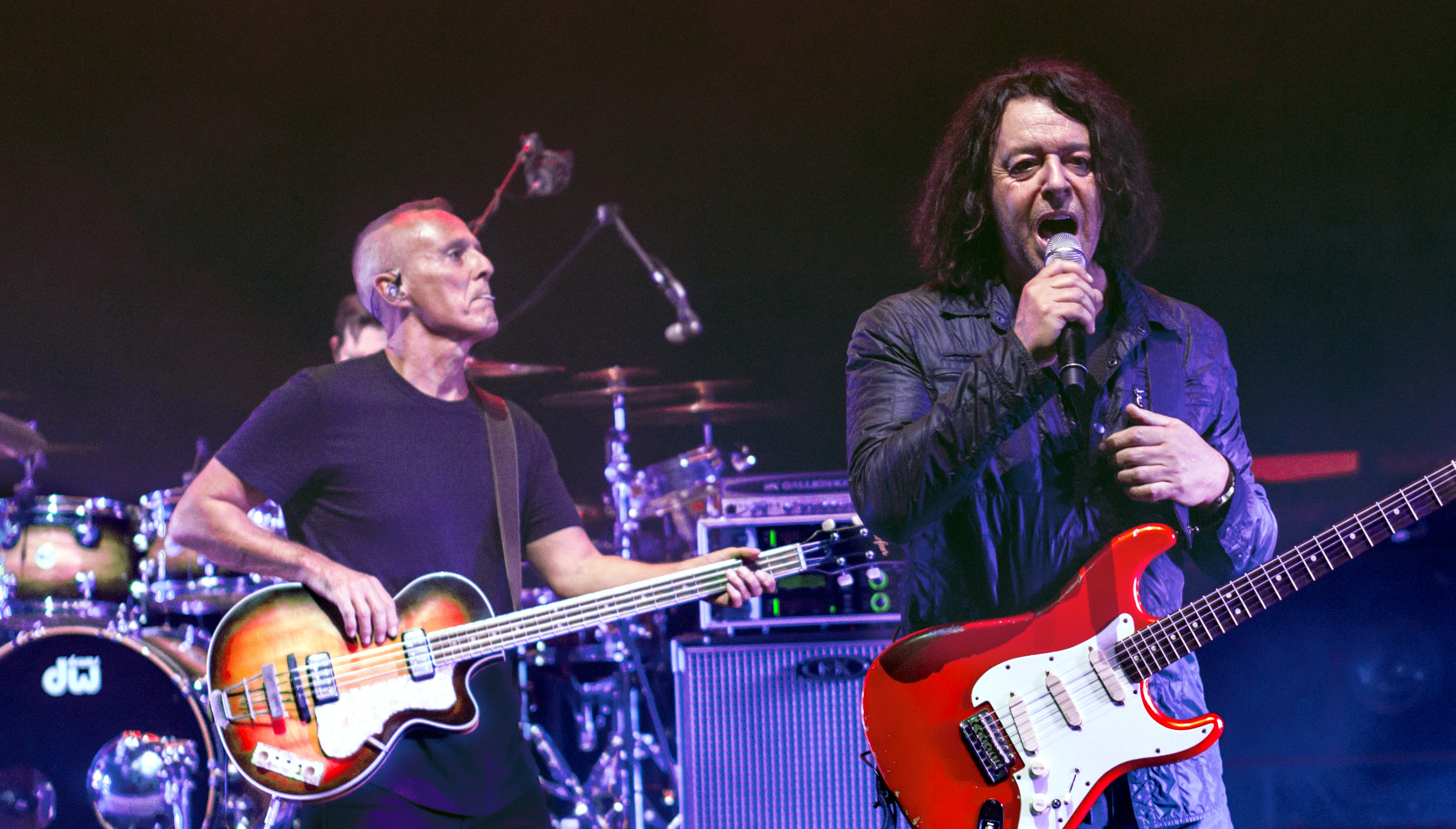
Tears for Fears held the number-one position for three weeks with "Shout" and "Everybody Wants to Rule the World".

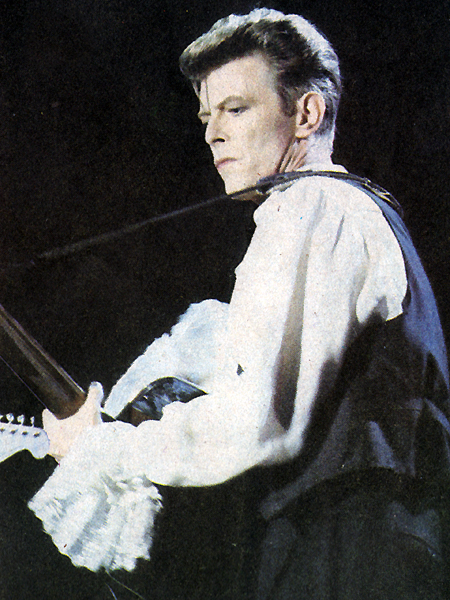
David Bowie (pictured) and Mick Jagger reached number one for two weeks in October with "Dancing in the Street".

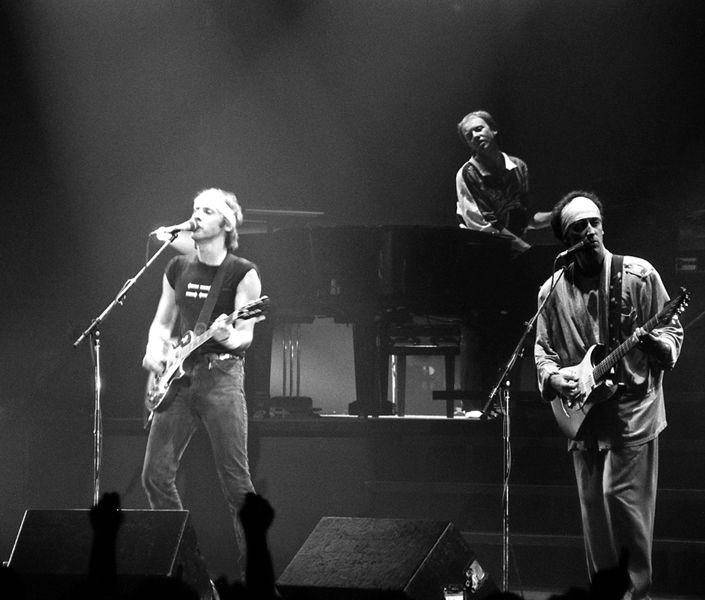
Dire Straits' "Money for Nothing" topped the RPM singles chart in late October.

Issue date	Song	Artist	Reference
5 January	"Do They Know It's Christmas?"	Band Aid	
12 January	"Do They Know It's Christmas?"	Band Aid	
19 January	"Like a Virgin"	Madonna	
26 January	"Careless Whisper"	George Michael	
2 February	"Careless Whisper"	George Michael	
9 February	"Easy Lover"	Philip Bailey and Phil Collins	
16 February	"Easy Lover"	Philip Bailey and Phil Collins	
23 February	"I Want to Know What Love Is"	Foreigner	
2 March	"I Want to Know What Love Is"	Foreigner	
9 March	"I Want to Know What Love Is"	Foreigner	
16 March	"Neutron Dance"	The Pointer Sisters	
23 March	"One More Night"	Phil Collins	
30 March	"Shout"	Tears for Fears	
6 April	"Shout"	Tears for Fears	
13 April	"Can't Fight This Feeling"	REO Speedwagon	
20 April	"Tears Are Not Enough"	Northern Lights	
27 April	"Tears Are Not Enough"	Northern Lights	
4 May	"We Are the World"	USA for Africa	
11 May	"We Are the World"	USA for Africa	
18 May	"We Are the World"	USA for Africa	
25 May	"Crazy for You"	Madonna	
1 June	"Don't You (Forget About Me)"	Simple Minds	
8 June	"Everybody Wants to Rule the World"	Tears for Fears	
15 June	"Everything She Wants"	Wham!	
22 June	"Everything She Wants"	Wham!	
29 June	"A View to a Kill"	Duran Duran	
6 July	"Never Surrender"†	Corey Hart	
13 July	"Never Surrender"†	Corey Hart	
20 July	"Never Surrender"†	Corey Hart	
27 July	"Never Surrender"†	Corey Hart	
3 August	"Every Time You Go Away"	Paul Young	
10 August	"You Spin Me Round (Like a Record)"	Dead or Alive	
17 August	"You Spin Me Round (Like a Record)"	Dead or Alive	
24 August	"The Power of Love"	Huey Lewis and the News	
31 August	"We Don't Need Another Hero (Thunderdome)"	Tina Turner	
7 September	"Crying Over You"	Platinum Blonde	
14 September	"St. Elmo's Fire (Man in Motion)"	John Parr	
21 September	"St. Elmo's Fire (Man in Motion)"	John Parr	
28 September	"St. Elmo's Fire (Man in Motion)"	John Parr	
5 October	"Dancing in the Street"	David Bowie and Mick Jagger	
12 October	"Dancing in the Street"	David Bowie and Mick Jagger	
19 October	"Cherish"	Kool & the Gang	
26 October	"Money for Nothing"	Dire Straits	
2 November	"Part-Time Lover"	Stevie Wonder	
9 November	"Part-Time Lover"	Stevie Wonder	
16 November	"Oh Sheila"	Ready for the World	
23 November	"Separate Lives"	Phil Collins and Marilyn Martin	
30 November	"Separate Lives"	Phil Collins and Marilyn Martin	
7 December	"We Built This City"	Starship	
14 December	"Broken Wings"	Mr. Mister	
21 December	"Say You, Say Me"	Lionel Richie	
28 December	"Say You, Say Me"	Lionel Richie	

== See also ==
- 1985 in music
- List of RPM number-one adult contemporary singles of 1985
- List of RPM number-one country singles of 1985
- List of Billboard Hot 100 number ones of 1985
- List of Cashbox Top 100 number-one singles of 1985
- List of Canadian number-one albums of 1985
