= List of number-one albums of 1985 (Canada) =

These are the Canadian number-one albums of 1985. The charts were compiled and published by RPM every Saturday.

== Number-one albums ==
†	This indicates the best performing album of the year.

Issue date	Album	Artist(s)	Ref
January 5	Volume 1	The Honeydrippers	
January 12	Volume 1	The Honeydrippers	
January 19	Volume 1	The Honeydrippers	
January 26	Make It Big	Wham!	
February 2	Make It Big	Wham!	
February 9	Make It Big	Wham!	
February 16	Make It Big	Wham!	
February 23	Reckless	Bryan Adams	
March 2	Reckless	Bryan Adams	
March 9	Make It Big	Wham!	
March 16	No Jacket Required †	Phil Collins	
March 23	No Jacket Required †	Phil Collins	
March 30	No Jacket Required †	Phil Collins	
April 6	No Jacket Required †	Phil Collins	
April 13	Songs from the Big Chair	Tears for Fears	
April 20	Songs from the Big Chair	Tears for Fears	
April 27	No Jacket Required †	Phil Collins	
May 4	No Jacket Required †	Phil Collins	
May 11	No Jacket Required †	Phil Collins	
May 18	No Jacket Required †	Phil Collins	
May 25	We Are the World	USA for Africa and various artists	
June 1	We Are the World	USA for Africa and various artists	
June 8	Songs from the Big Chair	Tears for Fears	
June 15	Songs from the Big Chair	Tears for Fears	
June 22	Songs from the Big Chair	Tears for Fears	
June 29	Songs from the Big Chair	Tears for Fears	
July 6	Songs from the Big Chair	Tears for Fears	
July 13	Songs from the Big Chair	Tears for Fears	
July 20	Songs from the Big Chair	Tears for Fears	
July 27	Boy in the Box	Corey Hart	
August 3	Boy in the Box	Corey Hart	
August 10	Boy in the Box	Corey Hart	
August 17	Boy in the Box	Corey Hart	
August 24	Boy in the Box	Corey Hart	
August 31	Boy in the Box	Corey Hart	
September 7	Boy in the Box	Corey Hart	
September 14	Brothers in Arms	Dire Straits	
September 21	Brothers in Arms	Dire Straits	
September 28	Brothers in Arms	Dire Straits	
October 5	Brothers in Arms	Dire Straits	
October 12	Brothers in Arms	Dire Straits	
October 19	Brothers in Arms	Dire Straits	
October 26	Brothers in Arms	Dire Straits	
November 2	Brothers in Arms	Dire Straits	
November 9	Brothers in Arms	Dire Straits	
November 16	Miami Vice	various artists	
November 23	Miami Vice	various artists	
November 30	Afterburner	ZZ Top	
December 7	Afterburner	ZZ Top	
December 14	Afterburner	ZZ Top	
December 21	Afterburner	ZZ Top	
December 28	Afterburner	ZZ Top	

== See also ==
- List of Canadian number-one singles of 1985
