= First Offense =

- U.S. album

Studio album by Corey Hart
- Released: 11 November 1983
- Recorded: 1982–1983
- Studios: Revolution Recording Studios, Cheadle Hulme, Greater Manchester, England; Eel Pie Studios, London, England
- Genres: New wave, synthrock
- Length: 41:28
- Labels: Aquarius (Canada) - AQR 537; EMI America (United States) - 2401861
- Producers: Jon Astley, Phil Chapman

Corey Hart chronology
First Offense (1983)	Boy in the Box (1985)

Singles from First Offense
- 1. "Sunglasses at Night" Released: January 21, 1984; 2. "It Ain't Enough" Released: 1984

Professional ratings
Review scores
Source	Rating
Allmusic	link

First Offense is the debut studio album by Canadian recording artist Corey Hart, released in 1983. It includes the hit single "Sunglasses at Night" and the ballad "It Ain't Enough". Hart was subsequently nominated for four Juno Awards and a Grammy Award for "Best New Artist".

== Background and writing ==
After meeting Billy Joel in a New York City recording studio, Hart was signed to Aquarius Records and went to England to record his first album. Much of it was recorded at Revolution Recording Studios in Cheshire, where owner Andy MacPherson helped him to gather a mix of British musicians who were known for their work in other bands, including Gary Tibbs (Adam and the Ants) on bass guitar, Paul Burgess (10cc) on drums and Michael Byron-Hehir (Sad Café) on guitar. Byron-Hehir became a full-time member of Hart's band for the next seven years. The album also features a cameo by Eric Clapton, playing the Dobro (resonator guitar); a fact mentioned in Hart's early promotional materials.

Hart had completed the album by August 1982, apart from "Sunglasses at Night" which had yet to be written. In a 1985 radio interview with CHUM-FM, Hart described how he returned to Canada and then wrote the song: "I wrote 'Sunglasses' and I said to the record company "I gotta do this song. I've just got to put it on the album" because ... it's just such an immediate song for me that when I wrote it, when I wrote the riff to that song, I said there's just something about it, some magic about this song. It was one of the only songs that I've written where I actually thought of the video at the time that I was writing it. I had that same gut feeling about 'Sunglasses' the minute I wrote it." The song, with its synthesizer-driven beat and distinctive guitar, was added to the album and became the hit lead single, rising to #7 on the Billboard Hot 100 charts.

The other singles from the album included the ballad "It Ain't Enough" which became a Top-20 hit, "She Got the Radio" which features a lead saxophone and "Lamp at Midnite". Hart toured North America and subsequently Europe and Australia on the strength of the "Sunglasses" single.

Three versions of First Offense were released. Both Canadian editions (on Aquarius Records) feature a black and white photograph of Hart on the cover standing against a brick wall. After the initial 1983 release, the track listing was amended for a revised 1985 issue, with one track being dropped, another added, and two tracks appearing in edited or remixed form. The U.S. edition (released on EMI in 1985) is more familiar as it is the cover used for all CD releases of the album (including the Canadian CD release) and features a colour close-up shot of Hart with stubble. Both versions of the Canadian LP edition feature an extra track, "Araby (She's Just a Girl)", which was not used on the EMI edition and has never been released on CD. As well, the initial Canadian LP edition features the track "Don't Keep Your Heart" which has similarly never been issued on CD.

In the liner notes, Hart dedicated the album to his mother Mindy.

== Track listings ==
All songs written by Corey Hart.

=== Original Canadian album (1983) ===
1. "Sunglasses at Night" - 3:58
2. "Peruvian Lady" - 4:20
3. "She Got the Radio" - 3:54
4. "It Ain't Enough" - 3:30
5. "Araby (She's Just a Girl)" - 3:40
6. "Does She Love You" - 3:31
7. "Cheatin' in School" - 4:24
8. "Don't Keep Your Heart" - 3:45
9. "The World Is Fire" - 5:03
10. "At the Dance" - 3:29
11. "Jenny Fey" - 3:35

=== Revised Canadian album (1983) ===
After the success of the initially non-LP single "Lamp At Midnite", the track listing and running order of First Offense was changed. The track "Don't Keep Your Heart" was dropped, "Lamp At Midnite" was added, "She Got The Radio" was shortened by about 15 seconds, and the single remix version of "It Ain't Enough" was substituted for the original album version.

1. "Sunglasses at Night" - 3:58
2. "Peruvian Lady" - 4:20
3. "She Got the Radio" - 3:39
4. "It Ain't Enough" - 3:29
5. "Araby (She's Just a Girl)" - 3:40
6. "Does She Love You" - 3:31
7. "Cheatin' in School" - 4:24
8. "Lamp at Midnite" - 4:10
9. "The World Is Fire" - 5:03
10. "At the Dance" - 3:29
11. "Jenny Fey" - 3:35

=== U.S. album (1984) ===
Compared to the revised Canadian version, the U.S. album featured an extended version of "Sunglasses at Night", restored the version of "She Got The Radio" back to its original length, and dropped "Araby (She's Just A Girl)". "Araby" saw release in the U.S. as the B-side of "It Ain't Enough". "Don't Keep Your Heart" (from the initial Canadian album release) was never issued in the U.S. in any form.

1. "Sunglasses at Night" - 5:20
2. "Peruvian Lady" - 4:21
3. "Lamp at Midnite" - 4:06
4. "She Got the Radio" - 3:56
5. "It Ain't Enough" - 3:31
6. "Does She Love You" - 3:35
7. "Cheatin' in School" - 4:25
8. "The World Is Fire" - 5:09
9. "At the Dance" - 3:31
10. "Jenny Fey" - 3:37

== Charts ==
Chart (1984)	Peak position
Australia (Kent Music Report)
US Billboard 200	31

== Awards ==
- The album was certified gold in the U.S. (over 500,000 sold) by the RIAA in January 1987.
- Hart was nominated for four Juno Awards in 1984 including "Male Vocalist of the Year", "Composer of the Year", "Single of the Year" and "Best Video" (winner).

== Music videos ==
Three music videos were produced for this album, all of them directed by Rob Quartly who was one of the most active Canadian music video directors at that time (and who went on to produce more videos for Hart).

The iconic video for "Sunglasses at Night" featured a futuristic vision of a police-run state with a young Hart wearing Ray-Ban Wayfarer sunglasses and trying to outrun the authorities. The video received heavy airplay on MTV and helped push the song up the Billboard charts. Quartly received the Juno Award for Video of the Year for "Sunglasses" in 1984.

Two versions of the video for the ballad "It Ain't Enough" were made, one redone for the U.S. market. The difference between these two versions is that one simply features Hart singing the song into a classic Shure model 55 microphone in a shadowy room, while the other focuses on a storyline of Hart trying to win back the affections of a girl. The audio is also different. The first version has the original mix of "It Ain't Enough", while the second version features the remix/single version, which adds a little guitar riff throughout the entire song.

The girl who appears as Hart's love interest in both the video for "Sunglasses" and one of the versions of "It Ain't Enough" is Laurie Brown, who was a host of The NewMusic and later became a VJ on MuchMusic.

== Personnel ==
- Corey Hart – lead vocals, backing vocals, keyboards
- Phil Chapman – keyboards
- Ritchie Close – keyboards
- Andy Barnett – lead guitar
- Jon Astley – rhythm guitar, backing vocals on "Peruvian Lady" and "At the Dance"
- Michael Hehir – rhythm guitar
- Andy MacPherson– rhythm guitar
- Eric Clapton – dobro guitar on "Jenny Fey"
- Gary Tibbs – bass
- Paul Burgess – drums, percussion
- Andy Hamilton – alto saxophone, tenor saxophone
- Tim Green – backing vocals on "Peruvian Lady" and "At the Dance"
- Phil Wooley – backing vocals on "Peruvian Lady" and "At the Dance"

== Production ==
- Jon Astley – producer, engineer
- Phil Chapman – producer, engineer
- Andy MacPherson – engineer
- Bob Ludwig – mastering at Masterdisk (New York City, New York).
- Greg Fulginiti – mastering at Artisan Sound Recorders (Hollywood, California).
- Henry Marquez – art direction
- Michael Diehl – design
- Jerry McGaraughty – back cover photography
- Raul Vega – front cover photography
