= List of RPM number-one adult contemporary singles of 1985 =

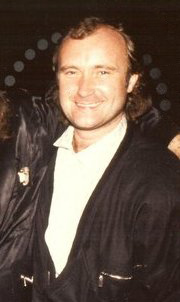
Phil Collins (pictured) spent the most weeks at number one in the chart, with "One More Night" (2 weeks) and "Separate Lives" (3 weeks)

In 1985, RPM magazine published a chart for top-performing singles in the adult contemporary category in Canada. The chart, entitled Adult Contemporary, undergone numerous name changes throughout its existence, becoming Adult Contemporary in August 1984 until the magazine's final publication in November 2000. In 1985, thirty-five individual songs topped the chart, which contained 30 positions and is based on record sales and adult contemporary radio station playlist submissions.

In RPM's first issue for 1985, the first adult contemporary number-one was a cover version of the 1950s hit "Sea of Love" by the short-lived supergroup The Honeydrippers, led by former Led Zeppelin members Robert Plant and Jimmy Page. After two weeks, "Sea of Love" would eventually be knocked off the top by Jermaine Jackson's "Do What You Do", which topped the chart for two weeks. "Do What You Do" would then be dethroned by Jack Wagner's "All I Need", which topped the chart the first week of February. A week later, "Careless Whisper" by Wham! would top the adult contemporary chart for the rest of February 1985, a week after the single topped the Canadian top 40 chart for two consecutive weeks. Wham! would have a second number-one adult contemporary hit with "Everything She Wants", which topped the chart for the week of June 8. Two artists would also have two number-one adult contemporary hits each for 1985, first with Phil Collins, with "One More Night" and "Separate Lives" (a duet with Marilyn Martin, from the White Nights soundtrack), and Stevie Wonder, with "Love Light in Flight" and "Part-Time Lover". Two Canadian acts would have at least one number-one adult contemporary hit for 1985, first with charity supergroup the Northern Lights with the single "Tears Are Not Enough" which topped the chart the week of May 11, followed by Corey Hart with "Never Surrender" the week of July 20. The final number-one on the chart for 1985 was Lionel Richie's "Say You, Say Me", which reached number-one on the final weeks of December.

== Chart history ==
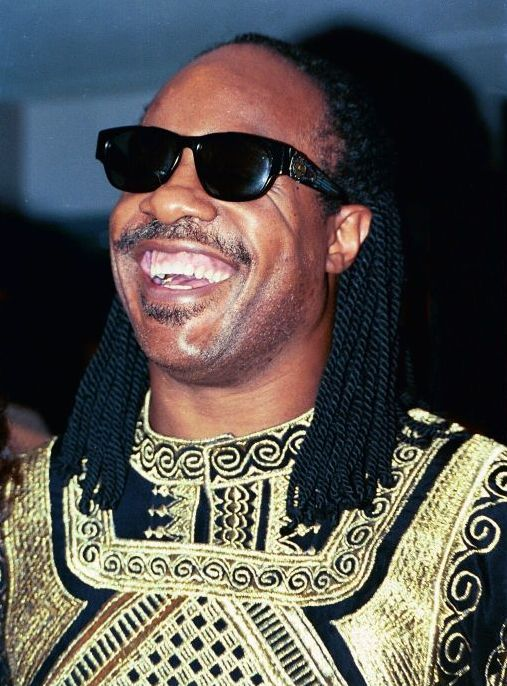
American singer Stevie Wonder (pictured in 1994) spent a total of four weeks at number one in the chart with "Love Light in Flight" (1 week) and "Part-Time Lover" (3 weeks)

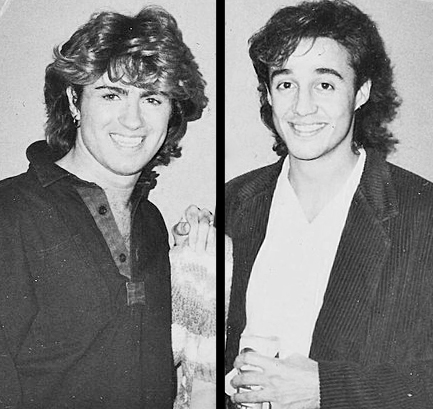
Wham! spent a total of four weeks at number one in the chart, including three weeks with "Careless Whisper".

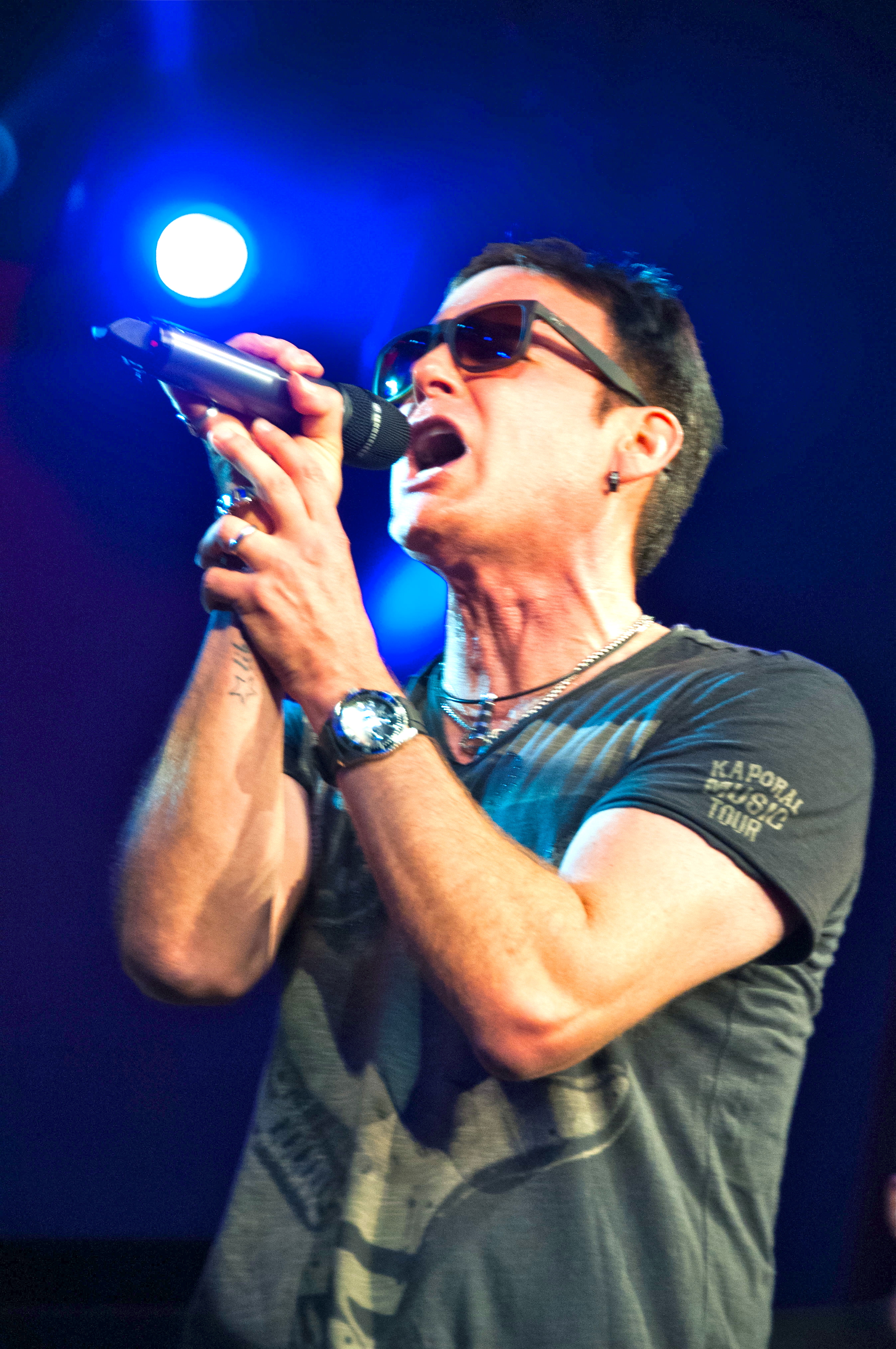
Canadian Corey Hart became the second Canadian artist to top the RPM adult contemporary chart with "Never Surrender".

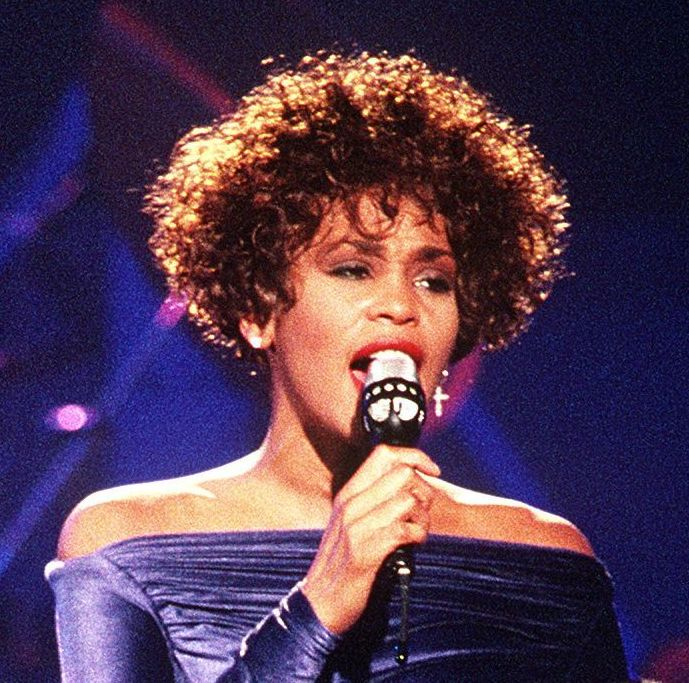
Whitney Houston charted her first number-one adult contemporary single in Canada with "Saving All My Love for You"

Chart history
Issue date	Title	Artist(s)	Ref.
January 5	"Sea of Love"	The Honeydrippers	
January 12	"Sea of Love"	The Honeydrippers	
January 19	"Do What You Do"	Jermaine Jackson	
January 26	"Do What You Do"	Jermaine Jackson	
February 2	"All I Need"	Jack Wagner	
February 9	"Careless Whisper"	Wham!	
February 16	"Careless Whisper"	Wham!	
February 23	"Careless Whisper"	Wham!	
March 2	"Love Light in Flight"	Stevie Wonder	
March 9	"You're the Inspiration"	Chicago	
March 16	"Crazy"	Kenny Rogers	
March 23	"Crazy"	Kenny Rogers	
March 30	"Hang On to Your Love"	Sade	
April 6	"Missing You"	Diana Ross	
April 13	"Too Late for Goodbyes"	Julian Lennon	
April 20	"One More Night"	Phil Collins	
April 27	"One More Night"	Phil Collins	
May 4	"Too Late for Goodbyes"	Julian Lennon	
May 11	"Tears Are Not Enough"	The Northern Lights	
May 18	"We Are the World"	USA for Africa	
May 25	"Rhythm of the Night"	DeBarge	
June 1	"Rhythm of the Night"	DeBarge	
June 8	"Everything She Wants"	Wham!	
June 15	"One Night in Bangkok"	Murray Head	
June 22	"Suddenly"	Billy Ocean	
June 29	"Axel F"	Harold Faltermeyer	
July 6	"Everybody Wants to Rule the World"	Tears for Fears	
July 13	"Everybody Wants to Rule the World"	Tears for Fears	
July 20	"Never Surrender"	Corey Hart	
July 27	"The Search Is Over"	Survivor	
August 3	"Everytime You Go Away"	Paul Young	
August 10	"Just As I Am"	Air Supply	
August 17	"Find a Way"	Amy Grant	
August 24	"Forever"	Kenny Loggins	
August 31	"Not Enough Love in the World"	Don Henley	
September 7	"You're Only Human (Second Wind)"	Billy Joel	
September 14	"You're Only Human (Second Wind)"	Billy Joel	
September 21	"Cherish"	Kool & the Gang	
September 28	"Cherish"	Kool & the Gang	
October 5	"We Don't Need Another Hero (Thunderdome)"	Tina Turner	
October 12	"Saving All My Love for You"	Whitney Houston	
October 19	"Saving All My Love for You"	Whitney Houston	
October 26	"Cry"	Godley & Creme	
November 2	"St. Elmo's Fire (Man in Motion)"	John Parr	
November 9	"Part-Time Lover"	Stevie Wonder	
November 16	"Part-Time Lover"	Stevie Wonder	
November 23	"Part-Time Lover"	Stevie Wonder	
November 30	"Separate Lives"	Phil Collins and Marilyn Martin	
December 7	"Separate Lives"	Phil Collins and Marilyn Martin	
December 14	"Separate Lives"	Phil Collins and Marilyn Martin	
December 21	"Say You, Say Me"	Lionel Richie	
December 28	"Say You, Say Me"	Lionel Richie	
