= Cheng Naishan =

Chinese writer

- Born: Chinese: 程乃珊; 1946; Shanghai, China
- Died: 22 April 2013 (aged 66–67); Shanghai, China
- Other names: Nancy Cheng, Cheng Nai-shan,
- Occupations: educator, writer
- Years active: 1965–2013
- Known for: works which focused on the culture and history of Shanghai

Cheng Naishan (Chinese: 程乃珊 1946 – 22 April 2013) was a writer from China who came from an upper-class background, had lived in Hong Kong, was trained in the English language, and was a Christian. Unlike her contemporaries, she taught English and later wrote in English. One of the most well-known of the Shanghai School (haipai) writing style, Cheng revived the literary legacy of the elites who had been rejected during the Cultural Revolution. She won numerous awards for her novels and short stories before embarking on a series of non-fiction works telling the history of "Old Shanghai".

== Early life ==
Cheng Naishan was born in 1946 in Shanghai, China, to Pan Zuojun (Chinese: 潘佐君) and the eldest son of the Cheng family. Her grandfather was Cheng Muhao (Chinese: 程慕灏), noted banker of the Qing dynasty bank who served as Deputy Director of the Bank of China in Kobe, Japan, treasurer and Deputy Manager of the Bank of China in Shanghai, Inspector of China Insurance Company and as the General Manager of the Bank of China in Hong Kong. When she was two years old, her family moved to Hong Kong, where she began her elementary education. She first studied at St. Mary's English School, but after two years, her father withdrew her and enrolled Cheng and her older brother in the elementary school attached to the communist-run Xiangdao Middle School. After completing the fourth grade, Cheng's family returned to Shanghai to manage the family business interests there. During her high school years, she loved watching films and became interested in how plots were developed. She was also encouraged to read and study by her parents. Her mother had been an aspiring writer, before the revolution. She completed high school in 1964 and as the Great Leap Forward had ended previously, she was not sent to work in the fields. She then attended Shanghai Teachers Training College graduating with a degree in English in 1965. Though her grandfather had helped the communist underground at the time of the revolution, during the Cultural Revolution (1966 until 1976), Cheng's family was persecuted because of their intellectual, bourgeois background and though they wanted to leave, they were aware it was too dangerous to even apply. Family heirlooms and treasures, like photographs and jewelry, were confiscated and lost or destroyed. and her mother was sent to a mental facility several times.

== Career ==
After completing her education, Cheng taught English at a Huimin Middle School (Chinese: 惠民中学英) in Shanghai until 1979. In that year, she published her first novel, Songs My Mother Taught Me (Mama jiao chang de ge) in the magazine Shanghai Literature. She had originally written the work after the Gang of Four were convicted, wanting to tell the story of her mother's tragedy. Filling two exercise books with her scribblings, Cheng asked friends to read them and give their opinion. They were moved by the work and encouraged her to submit it to the editorial department of Shanghai Literature. When the story was accepted, if she would allow it to be edited, Cheng was encouraged to quit her teaching job and pursue a career in writing. That work was followed by a collection of short stories, Death of a Swan, published in 1982. In 1985, she joined the Chinese Writers Association and that same year began working at their Shanghai branch as a professional writer and won the National Best Novella award for her story, Daughter’s Tribulations (Nüer jing, Chinese: 女儿经, 1985).

Cheng explored topics that were rarely dealt with by her contemporary writers. She wrote about upper-class urban life, while her peers predominantly wrote about peasants, soldiers and workers. Intellectuals, with university education, wanted to participate in the development of China, but they were not allowed to do so. One of the reasons Cheng wrote about them was to recover the story of the generation lost between the national entrepreneurs at the end of the Republican era and the beginning of the communist era. She also wrote themes exploring her Christianity, casting religion, in the mostly-atheist literary tradition, in a sympathetic light. Rather than directly writing about religion, Cheng demonstrated beliefs in the actions of her characters. In addition to writing her own stories, Cheng translated the works of other writers including a translation with her mother of Nien Cheng's Life and Death in Shanghai (1987) and Amy Tan's The Joy Luck Club (1989).

Cheng wrote over seventy novels and novellas, nearly a dozen of which have been translated into English, Esperanto, French, German and Japanese. The Daughter’s Tribulations was adapted for film and four other works were presented as television dramas. Her most known work, The Blue House (1983) was based upon relationships of people she had known in her past. A son who rejected his father because the father tried to force him into an arranged marriage and a relative of her husband's whose complicated relationships between his wife, his concubine and the sons of both women give glimpses into the cultural elites' lives during politically changing times. It examines family relationships, rehabilitation and inheritance. The book won the "Zhong Shan" Literary Award. Her work The Poor Street (1989), also featured as a television adaptation, was a break from previous works, presenting a view of the blue collar and lower class life in Shanghai's diverse population. Her book The Bankers (1989) covered three generations (her grandfather's, her parents' and her own) of Chinese history and life in Shanghai and is the fictionalized tale of her own grandfather's life.

In the 1990s, Cheng was able to use her Hong Kong citizenship to relocate there. She later traveled back and forth between Shanghai and Hong Kong, dividing her time between the cities for a decade before returning to Shanghai. Around the same time, Cheng wrote and published a series of non-fiction works, including Shanghai Tango (Shanghai tan'ge, Chinese: 上海探戈, 2002), Shanghai Lady (Shanghai nüren, Chinese: 上海女人, 2004), Shanghai Fashion (Shanghai shizhuang, Chinese: 上海时装, 2005), Shanghai Romance (Shanghai langmanshi, Chinese: 上海浪漫史, 2006) and Shanghai Saxophone (Shanghai sakesifeng, Chinese: 上海萨克斯风, 2007), which focused history of Shanghai. The illustrated books highlighted significant areas of the city's culture and were inspired when she realized that her grandchildren did not understand the history of their own city. She began collecting stories about various aspects of the city from old-timers, researching everything from the architecture to the people and legends of the city, "Old Shanghai", before the revolution.

== Death and legacy ==
Cheng died in Shanghai on 22 April 2013 after battling leukemia. Cheng's monumental work on documenting the history of Old Shanghai, though interrupted by her death, preserved a unique part of China's history.
