= Fan Xiaoqing =

Chinese writer

- 范小青
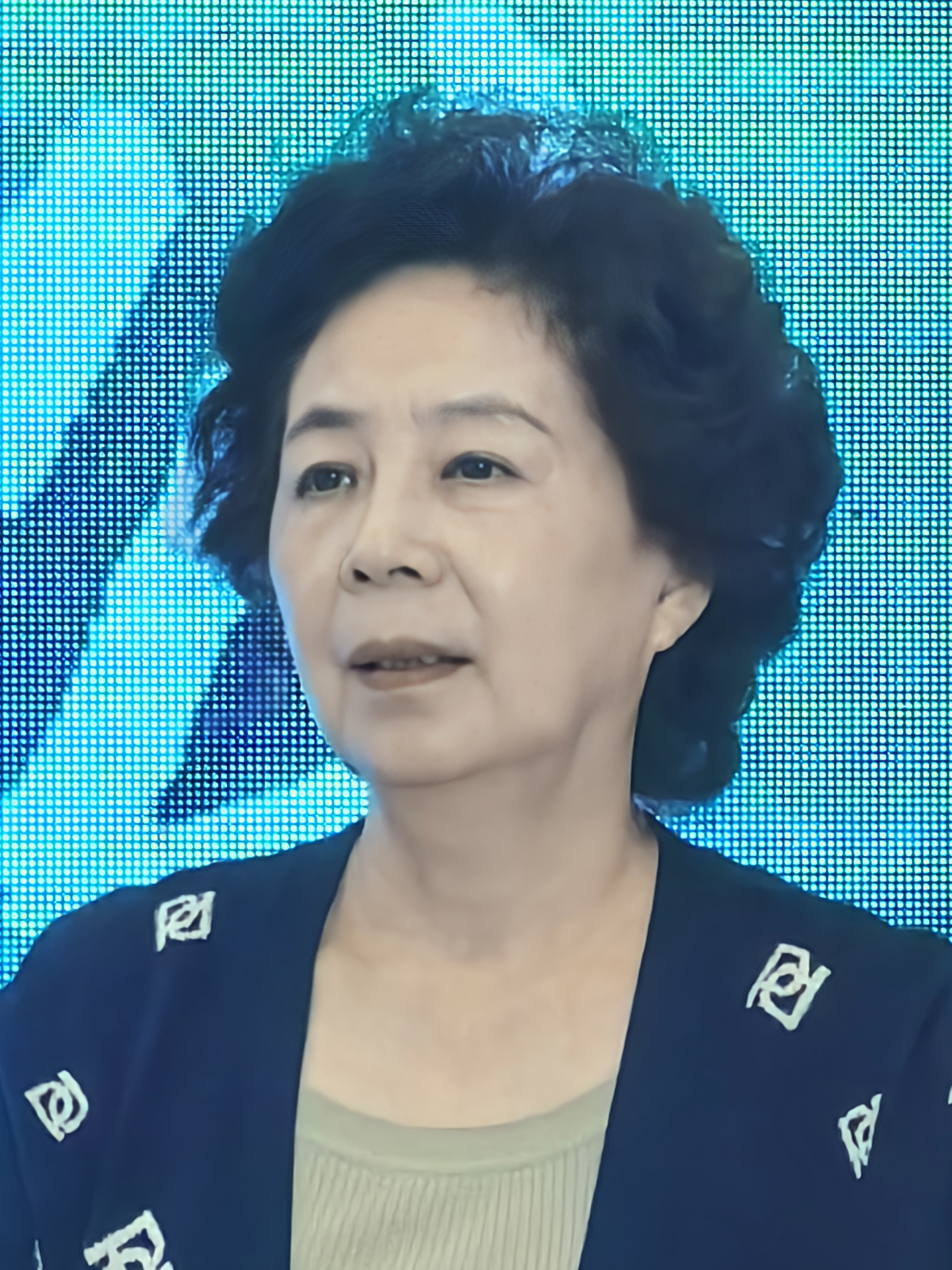
- Fan Xiaoqing in July 2026
- Born: 1955 (age 70–71); Shanghai, China
- Education: Soochow University
- Occupations: Novelist, screenwriter, nonfiction writer
- Relatives: Fan Xiaotian (brother)
- Writing career
- Language: Written Chinese
- Period: 1980–present

Fan Xiaoqing (born 1955; Chinese: 范小青) is a contemporary Chinese writer. A member of China's "new realist fiction movement," she writes about everyday life in her home province of Jiangsu.

== Biography ==
Fan was born in Shanghai in 1955, and grew up in Suzhou, Jiangsu province. She went to work in the countryside after high school, then attended the Suzhou Normal Academy, where she graduated with a degree in Chinese in 1982. She then worked at her alma mater, teaching art and literary theory.

Fan had published her first story in 1980, and five years later she left her teaching career and became a professional writer, joining the Jiangsu branch of the China Writers Association. She later served as president of the local branch.

She has written nearly 20 novels including Barefoot Doctor, Wan Quanhe (赤脚医生万泉和), the story of a rural doctor's struggles, and Female Comrade (女同志), a rare depiction of the inner lives of women in China's political sphere. She has also published dozens of short stories in both anthologies and solo collections. Several of her stories appear in English translation in the Chinese Literature Press series Contemporary Chinese Women Writers alongside Chi Li, Cheng Naishan, and others.

Fan has also written scripts for TV series including Fei's Children (费家有女) and Cadre (干部). In 2024, her novel Barefoot Doctor, Wan Quanhe was adapted into the film My Love Flows Like a Song (赤脚医生万泉和), directed by Fan Xiaotian and starring Guo Tao, Kong Lin, and Tien Niu.

Fan mainly writes about daily life in Suzhou and the difficulties of life in rural China, sometimes in a humorous tone. She is considered representative of the middle generation of modern Chinese writers who came into prominence in the 1980s, part of the "new realist fiction" movement.

Though her more recent works often deal with political subject matter, Fan is considered politically moderate and restrained. She previously served as a member of the National Committee of the Chinese People's Political Consultative Conference.

She was awarded the National Excellent Short Story Award of the Lu Xun Literary Prize for her 2006 story "City Living, Country Living." Her novel Expression of a City also won the Five-One Project Award.
