= Nien Cheng =

Chinese author (1915–2009)

- 姚念媛
- Born: January 28, 1915; Beijing, China
- Died: November 2, 2009 (aged 94); Washington, D.C., U.S.
- Citizenship: American
- Writing career
- Notable work: Life and Death in Shanghai

Chinese name
- Traditional Chinese: 鄭念
- Simplified Chinese: 郑念
Transcriptions
Standard Mandarin
- Hanyu Pinyin: Zhèng Niàn
- Wade–Giles: Cheng Nien

Nien Cheng or Zheng Nian (January 28, 1915 – November 2, 2009) was the pen name of Yao Nien-Yuan (Chinese: 姚念媛; pinyin: Yáo Niànyuán). She was a Chinese author known for recounting her experiences during the Cultural Revolution in her memoir Life and Death in Shanghai.

== Biography ==
Cheng was born into a rich landowning family in Beijing. She studied at Yenching University and later went to London to obtain a master's degree at the London School of Economics. She returned to China after graduation.

During her time in London, Cheng also met her husband Kang-chi Cheng and converted to Christianity. Upon their return to China, Kang-chi Cheng joined the Foreign Affairs ministry of the Nationalist government. The couple lived in Australia briefly, setting up an embassy there, and eventually moved to Shanghai. After the Chinese Communist Party came to power in 1949, Kang-chi Cheng served at Shell's office in Shanghai until his death from cancer in 1957. Nien Cheng then joined the company as an adviser. The couple had one daughter named Meiping, but she died under uncertain circumstances when her mother was in prison.

In 1966, Cheng was targeted by the Red Guards and accused of being a British spy, as she was both Western-educated and the widow of a former manager of a foreign firm in Shanghai.

Cheng's memoir documents her account of her subsequent confinement, which lasted for over six years. She managed to endure the tortures and abuses inflicted by the interrogators and never made any false confessions or perjuries. Cheng cited Mao Zedong's teachings to counter her interrogators, frequently turning the tide of the struggle sessions against them. Although the living conditions at the detention house were inhumanly squalid, Cheng still tried to maintain her dignity and keep her appearance decent. In 1973, when offered parole on the basis that her attitude had shown improvement, Cheng resisted leaving the detention house without first receiving official acknowledgment from her captors that she had been unjustly detained.

Upon her release, Cheng was relocated from her spacious home to two bedrooms on the second floor of a two-story building. Cheng continued her life under constant surveillance, including spying by the family on the first floor. When released from jail, Cheng was told that her daughter Meiping Cheng (Chinese: 郑梅萍; pinyin: Zhèng Méipíng) had committed suicide. After Cheng conducted a discreet investigation, she found that this scenario was impossible, and she came to believe that Meiping had been murdered by Maoists after she refused to denounce her mother. The alleged killer of Meiping, a rebel worker named Hu Yongnian, was arrested and given a suspended death sentence by Shanghai authorities in 1980, but he was eventually paroled in 1995.

Cheng lived in China until 1980. Using funds that her husband had placed in overseas bank accounts, she first emigrated to Canada and later to Washington, D.C., where she wrote the autobiography. Cheng never returned to China. She stated that the main reason she remained in her self-imposed exile was that she could not bear the constant reminder of her dead daughter at the sight of other young Chinese women. Meanwhile, Cheng also suspected that she was still a constant target of surveillance by the Chinese government. In an interview conducted in 1998, Cheng said she would never return to China until the portrait of Chairman Mao was removed from the gate of Tiananmen Square.

Cheng was a longtime friend of Nelson T. Johnson and his wife. After moving to Washington, D.C., Cheng traveled extensively and was a frequent speaker on the lecture circuit. She was also a close friend of Suzanne Hiltermann-Souloumiac, who encouraged her to write about her experiences. Nien and Suzanne exchanged several letters on Life and Death in Shanghai. Canadian singer Corey Hart recorded an instrumental song inspired by her memoir in his 1990 album Bang!

Cheng died of renal failure in Washington, D.C., on November 2, 2009.
