= It Ain't Enough =

Single by Corey Hart

from the album First Offense
- B-side: "Araby (She's Just a Girl)"
- Released: 1983 (Canada); 1984 (US)
- Recorded: April 1982, Revolution Studios UK
- Length: 3:28 (7" version)
- Label: EMI America (US)
- Songwriter: Corey Hart
- Producers: Jon Astley, Phil Chapman

Corey Hart singles chronology
"Sunglasses at Night" (1984)	"It Ain't Enough" (1983)	"She Got the Radio" (1984)

"It Ain't Enough" is a song by Canadian singer Corey Hart, released as the second single from his debut album, First Offense. The song was written by Hart and produced by Jon Astley and Phil Chapman.

There are two distinct mixes of the song, each one a hit in a different country. The original Canadian mix was issued on initial vinyl copies of Hart's debut album First Offense, and as a single in Canada. This version peaked at #4 on the Canadian charts. This "original mix" version was also featured in the song's original video, a performance-oriented clip featuring Hart and his band and saw inclusion in some CD releases, such as in Japan.

For the US single release, the song was remixed and a distinctive guitar lick was added that runs throughout the entire track. As well, the backing vocals before the sax solo were omitted; there are also several other subtler differences in the US mix. The video for "It Ain't Enough" was also altered; although the performance element remained, new footage was shot outside a bar in The Beaches neighbourhood of Toronto and intercut into the existing video to create a romantic storyline featuring Hart. This version of "It Ain't Enough" peaked at #17 on the US Billboard Hot 100 chart, and is the version found on all post-1984 issues of First Offense.

== Chart performance ==
Chart (1984–5)	Peak position
Australia (Kent Music Report)	37
Canadian RPM Singles	71
US Billboard Hot 100	17
US Billboard Adult Contemporary	19
