= Life and Death in Shanghai =

1987 autobiography

- Author: Nien Cheng
- Language: English
- Genre: Memoirs
- Publisher: Grove Press, Penguin Books
- Publication date: May 1987
- Publication place: United States
- Media type: Print
- Pages: 547 pages
- Awards: New York Times Bestseller New York Times Best Book of the Year (1987) Best Books for Public Libraries (1992) American Library Association’s Outstanding Books for The College Bound (1996)
- ISBN: 978-0-394-55548-5

Life and Death in Shanghai (Chinese: 上海生死劫) is an autobiographical memoir published in November 1987 by Chinese author Yao Nien-Yuan under the pen name Nien Cheng. Written while in exile in the United States, it tells the story of Cheng's arrest during the early days of the Cultural Revolution, her more than six years' of confinement, persecution, efforts to leave China, and life in exile.

== Background ==
Cheng was named "an enemy of the state" and arrested in late 1966 after the Red Guards looted her home. During her confinement, she was pressured to make a false confession that she was a spy for "the imperialists" because for many years after her husband's death she had continued to work as a senior partner for Shell in Shanghai. Cheng refused and was thus tortured.

She was eventually paroled under the pretense that her attitude had shown improvement. However, Cheng resisted leaving the detention house without receiving acknowledgment from her captors that she had been unjustly treated.

When released from jail in 1973, Cheng found that her daughter Meiping, who had been studying to become a film actress, had been murdered by the Red Guards, although the official position was that she had committed suicide. Cheng conducted a discreet investigation and found that this scenario was impossible. The alleged killer of Meiping, a rebel worker named Hu Yongnian, was arrested and given a suspended death sentence by Shanghai authorities in 1980, but was eventually paroled in 1995.

After being relocated from her spacious home to a mere two bedrooms on the second floor of a two-story building, Cheng continued her life under constant surveillance, including spying by the family living on the first floor.

She lived in China until 1980, when the political climate warmed enough for her to apply for a visa to the United States to visit family. She never returned, first emigrating to Canada, later to Washington, D.C., where she wrote the memoir.

== Summary ==
The memoir goes into great detail about Cheng's persecution, confinement, and torture, so much so that she said she had to put the manuscript away many times as she wrote it because the memories were so troubling.

== Reception ==
In a 1987 piece for the New York Times Books Review, J.M. Coetzee said the memoir provided "fascinating insights into thought reform in Mao's China" and that it tells "an absorbing story of resourcefulness and courage, spoiled only by a touch of self-righteousness: Mrs. Cheng is always right, her persecutors always wrong."

In a 1987 New York Times review, Christopher Lehmann-Haupt wrote: "Far from depressing, it is almost exhilarating to witness her mind do battle. Even in English, the keenness of her thought and expression is such that it constitutes some form of martial art, enabling her time and again to absorb the force of her interrogators’ logic and turn it to her own advantage.”

In a 1987 review for The Washington Post, Stanley Karnow wrote: "It is, on one level, a gripping, poignant chronicle of her courage, fortitude and, above all, stubborn integrity during more than six years of cold, hunger, disease, terror and humiliation in a Shanghai jail. At moments I could not continue reading, so vividly does she relate her agony. Yet, inevitably, I felt compelled to go back to its pages, riveted by her struggle to endure, which exalts the triumph of the human spirit over mindless inhumanity."

Elena Brunet of The Los Angeles Times wrote in a 1988 review: "A harrowing story of personal suffering and tragedy, and at the same time a savage and compelling indictment of Mao Zedong’s Cultural Revolution, if not of Chinese communism itself."

Inspired by the memoir, Corey Hart dedicated an instrumental song to Cheng titled "Ballade for Nien Cheng" in his 1990 album Bang!.

== Awards ==
Life and Death in Shanghai won multiple awards, including New York Times Best Book of the Year (1987) and American Library Association's Outstanding Books for The College Bound (1996), among others.

== See also ==
- Four Olds
- Five Black Categories
- Human rights in China
