= Everything in My Heart =

Single by Corey Hart

from the album Boy in the Box
- B-side: "Rudolph, The Red-Nosed Reindeer"
- Released: November 1985
- Studio: Le Studio, Morin Heights, Quebec
- Length: 4:16 (7")
- Label: Aquarius (CAN), EMI America (U.S.)
- Songwriter: Corey Hart
- Producers: Phil Chapman, Jon Astley and Corey Hart

Corey Hart singles chronology
| "Boy in the Box" (1985) | "Everything in My Heart" (1985) | "Eurasian Eyes" (1986) |

"Everything in My Heart" is a song by Canadian singer Corey Hart. It was released in November 1985 as the third single from Hart's sophomore album, Boy in the Box. The second chart-topper from the album (after "Never Surrender"), "Everything In My Heart" hit CAN #1 on January 18, 1986 (RPM) and was CRIA-certified Gold on January 29, 1986 (Music Canada).

On February 1, 1986, the same day that its parent album, 'Boy In The Box', was CRIA-certified Diamond for domestic shipments of one million units, "Everything In My Heart" peaked at US #30 (Billboard Hot 100).

The single was originally pressed in translucent red vinyl and its b-side featured a live recording of the seasonal Gene Autry Christmas classic, "Rudolph the Red Nosed Reindeer".

== Music video ==
The music video was directed by Rob Quartly and was filmed in Boston.

== Charts ==
| Chart (1985–86) | Peak position |
|---|---|
| Canada Top Singles (RPM) | 1 |
| US Billboard Hot 100 | 30 |
| US Billboard Adult Contemporary | 39 |
