= Judy Astley =

English illustrator and novelist

Judy Astley is an English illustrator and author of over 20 novels all published by Black Swan. Her first novel was published in 1994, and since then she has published one novel nearly every year. She has also written articles for The Times as well as short stories for My Weekly and Woman magazines.

== Biography ==
Judy Astley was born in Blackburn, Lancashire though has spent most of her life in Twickenham. Before becoming an author she spent some time as a freelance designer and dressmaker for Liberty. She is married to record producer Jon Astley and has two adult daughters.

== Bibliography ==
=== Children's books ===
- When One Cat Woke Up: A Cat Counting Book (1990)

=== Novels ===
- Just for the Summer (1994)
- Pleasant Vices (1995)
- Seven for a Secret (1996)
- Muddy Waters (1997)
- Every Good Girl (1998)
- The Right Thing (1999)
- Excess Baggage (2000)
- No Place for a Man (2001)
- Unchained Melanie (2002)
- Away from It All (2003)
- Size Matters (2004)
- All Inclusive (2005)
- Blowing It (2006)
- Laying the Ghost (2007)
- Other People's Husbands (2008)
- The Look of Love (2011)
- I Should Be So Lucky (2012)
- In the Summertime (2013)
- It Must Have Been the Mistletoe (2014)
- A Merry Mistletoe Wedding (2015)
