= Corey Hart (album) =

Studio album by Corey Hart
- Released: 15 October 1996
- Recorded: 1995–1996
- Studios: Record Plant, Rumbo Recorders, The Village Recorder and Westlake Studios (Los Angeles, California); Brooklyn Studios (Hollywood, California); Sound Stage Studios (Nashville, Tennessee)
- Genres: Pop; Rock
- Length: 47:09
- Label: Columbia
- Producers: Corey Hart; Humberto Gatica

Corey Hart chronology
Attitude & Virtue (1992)	Corey Hart (1996)	Jade (1998)

Corey Hart is the seventh album by Corey Hart, released in 1996. It generated four charting singles in Canada.

== Track listing ==
All songs written by Corey Hart, except as noted.

1. "Black Cloud Rain" - 4:22
2. "Someone" - 4:36
3. "Love Hurts" - 4:19 (Boudleaux Bryant)
4. "Third of June" - 4:36
5. "Simplicity" - 4:32
6. "Tell Me" - 3:35
7. "Angel of My Soul" - 4:25
8. "Sunflowers" - 4:58
9. "Kiss the Sky" - 3:18
10. "On Your Own" - 4:08
11. "India" - 4:20

== Personnel ==
- Corey Hart – lead vocals, backing vocals (1–8), arrangements (1, 2, 4–11)
- Claude Gaudette – programming (1, 10), keyboards (2–4, 6, 7, 11), Hammond B3 organ (8, 9)
- Tony Smith – keyboards (4, 5, 11)
- Greg Phillinganes – acoustic piano (7, 8)
- Dean Parks – acoustic guitar (1, 10)
- Tim Pierce – guitars (1–3, 6, 9), nylon guitar (1), acoustic guitar (4, 11), mandolin (4)
- Michael Thompson – slide guitar (1), acoustic guitar (2), guitars (3, 5, 7–9), electric guitar (4, 11), sitar (4), dobro (8)
- Pat Buchanan – guitars (2, 6)
- Michael Landau – guitars (4), electric guitar (10)
- Mike Brignardello – bass (2, 4–6, 9, 11)
- John Pierce – bass (3)
- Nathan East – bass (7, 8)
- Kenny Aronoff – drums (1–9), percussion (1, 5, 6, 9, 11)
- Rafael Padilla – percussion (4, 7, 11)
- Michael Haynes – trumpet (6)
- Julie Masse – backing vocals (1, 11)
- Dorian Sherwood – backing vocals (1, 5, 8–11)
- Yvonne Williams – backing vocals (5, 8, 9)

== Production ==
- Vito Luprano – executive producer
- Corey Hart – producer
- Humberto Gatica – producer, mixing, recording (1, 3–5, 7–11)
- Alex Rodriguez – recording
- Chuck Ainlay – recording (2, 6)
- Paul Boutin – recording assistant
- Chris Brooke – recording assistant
- Kevin Wright – recording assistant (1, 4, 7)
- Terry Bradshaw – recording assistant (2, 4, 5, 7, 8, 11)
- Graham Lewis – recording assistant (2, 6)
- Vlado Meller – mastering at Sony Music Studios (New York City, New York)
- Catherine McRae – art direction, design
- Randee St. Nicholas – photography
- Bruce Brault – managerment
