= Jade (Corey Hart album) =

Studio album by Corey Hart
- Released: 1998
- Recorded: 1997–1998
- Studios: Compass Point Studios (Nassau, Bahamas); Cove City Sound Studios (Long Island, New York, USA); Studio Mega (Paris, France); Studio Bateau-Lune (Sceaux, France)
- Genres: Pop; Rock
- Length: 47:48
- Label: Columbia
- Producers: Corey Hart; Erick Benzi (Track 5)

Corey Hart chronology
| Corey Hart (1996) | Jade (1998) |

Professional ratings
Review scores
| Source | Rating |
|---|---|
| AllMusic | 3/5 stars |

Jade is the eighth album by Corey Hart, released in 1998. Three singles were released from the album.

== Track listing ==
All songs written by Corey Hart.

1. "Let It Fly" – 3:55
2. "Without You" – 2:49
3. "You & I" – 3:51
4. "Break the Chain" – 4:27
5. "Là-Bas" (duet with Julie Masse) – 4:32
6. "So Visible (Easy to Miss)" – 4:14
7. "Jade" – 4:18
8. "Reconcile" – 4:09
9. "Above the Trees" – 4:16
10. "Bittersweet" – 3:43
11. "Believing" – 3:51
12. "Everytime You Smile" – 3:43

== Personnel ==
Musicians

- Corey Hart – vocals, keyboards (1, 3, 4, 7–10, 12), arrangements (1–4, 6–12), backing vocals (4), acoustic piano (8, 12)
- David "DibS" Shackney – keyboards (1–3), programming (1–3)
- Dave Katz – additional keyboards (2)
- Michel Corriveau – acoustic piano (2), Mellotron (4), Hammond B3 organ (6, 7, 11), keyboards (7), accordion (10), Wurlitzer electric piano (11)
- Erick Benzi – keyboards (4, 5, 12), programming (4), arrangements (5), additional keyboards (8), bass (12)
- Doug "DUG" McGuirk – guitars (1–3)
- Tim Pierce – guitars (1, 4, 11)
- Sylvain Quesnel – guitars (1–3, 8, 11)
- Danny Ranallo – guitars (1, 8, 10), dobro (12)
- Michael Thompson – guitars (1–4, 6–10), sitar (3), mandolin (6)
- Chris Goearicke – guitars (2)
- Gildas Arzel – guitars (5)
- Nicholas Mingot – guitars (5)
- Mike Brignardello – bass (1, 2, 7–9)
- John Pierce – bass (3, 6, 7, 10)
- Mike Boyko – drums (1, 3)
- Kenny Aronoff – percussion (1–3, 6–11), drums (2, 6–11)
- Julie Masse – backing vocals (1, 4, 8–10, 12), vocals (5)
- Dorian Sherwood – backing vocals (1–4, 6–11)

Handclaps on "Bittersweet"

- Kenny Aronoff
- Oswald "Ozzy Wiz" Bowe
- Bruce Brault
- Mike Brignardello

== Production ==
- Vito Luprano – executive producer
- Corey Hart – producer (1–4, 6–12)
- Doug "DUG" McGuirk – additional production (1–3)
- David "DibS" Shackney – additional production (1–3)
- Erick Benzi – additional production (4), producer (5)
- Humberto Gatica – additional production (4)
- Catherine McRae – art direction, design
- Randee St. Nicholas – photography
- Erika Gagnon – painting
- Marc Lostracco – painting
- Bruce Brault – management

Technical credits

- Vlado Meller – mastering at Sony Music Studios (New York City, New York)
- Terry Manning – recording (1–4, 7–12), mixing (6, 7, 9–12)
- Doug "DUG" McGuirk – mixing (1–3), additional engineer (1, 3)
- David "DibS" Shackney – mixing (1–3), additional engineer (1, 3)
- Humberto Gatica – mixing (4, 8)
- Oswald "Ozzy Wiz" Bowe – recording assistant, mix assistant (6, 7, 9–12)
