= Young Man Running =

Studio album by Corey Hart
- Released: 23 June 1988
- Recorded: 1987–1988
- Studios: Track 1 recorded at Sarm West Studios (London, UK); Tracks 2–11 recorded at AIR Studios (Montserrat)
- Genres: Pop; Rock
- Length: 41:36
- Labels: Aquarius (Canada); Manhattan (United States)
- Producers: Corey Hart; Andy Richards

Corey Hart chronology
| Fields of Fire (1986) | Young Man Running (1988) | Bang! (1990) |

Young Man Running is the fourth album by Corey Hart, released in 1988. It charted in the U.S., reaching #121, and generated the hit single, "In Your Soul", which reached #38.

== Track listing ==
All songs written by Corey Hart.

1. "Don't Take Me to the Racetrack" – 3:40
2. "In Your Soul" (with Ruby Turner) – 3:57
3. "Truth Will Set You Free" – 4:21
4. "Chase the Sun" – 3:18
5. "So It Goes..." – 3:48
6. "Still in Love" – 3:41
7. "Spot You in a Coalmine" (with Ruby Turner) – 4:50
8. "Lone Wolf" – 3:41
9. "No Love Lost" – 4:02
10. "Crossroad Caravan" – 2:43
11. "Chippin' Away" – 3:40
12. "21" (bonus track for Japanese release only)

== Personnel ==
- Corey Hart – lead vocals, keyboards, acoustic piano, backing vocals (1–7, 9, 10)
- Andy Richards – keyboards, Fairlight Series III programming
- Ray Coburn – additional keyboards
- Michael Hehir – electric guitars, acoustic guitars, dobro, mandolin, harmonica
- Russell Boswell – bass
- Greg Haver – drums
- Mel Collins – saxophones
- Andy Hamilton – saxophones
- Ruby Turner – backing vocals (2), lead vocals (7)
- Matt D'Arbanlay-Butler – leading thespian (5)
- Escolania de Montserrat – choir (8)
- The "Good 'Ole Boys" – backing vocals (11)

== Production ==
- Corey Hart – producer
- Andy Richards – producer (1, 2, 4, 5, 8, 9)
- Bruce Brault – executive producer
- Matt D'Arbanlay-Butler – engineer, recording, mixing
- Richard Edwards – assistant engineer
- Matt Howe – assistant engineer
- Paul Rushbrooke – technical assistant
- Rich Travali – technical assistant
- Bob Ludwig – mastering at Masterdisk (New York City, New York, USA)
- Erika Gargon – design, additional photography
- Herb Ritts – photography
- Rebecca Blake – additional photography
- Freddy Demann – management

== Charts ==
| Chart (1988) | Peak position |
|---|---|
| Canada Top Albums/CDs (RPM) | 11 |
| US Billboard 200 | 121 |

== Certifications ==
Certifications for Young Man Running
| Region | Certification | Certified units/sales |
|---|---|---|
| Canada (Music Canada) | Platinum | 100,000^{^} |
^{^} Shipments figures based on certification alone.
