= Bang! (Corey Hart album) =

Studio album by Corey Hart
- Released: March 12, 1990
- Recorded: 1989–1990
- Studios: Rumbo (Los Angeles, California); Can-Am (Tarzana, California)
- Genres: Pop; rock
- Length: 42:57
- Label: EMI
- Producers: Corey Hart; Greg Edward

Corey Hart chronology
Young Man Running (1988)	Bang! (1990)	Singles (1992)

Bang! is an album by the Canadian musician Corey Hart, released in 1990. It was his last album to chart in the U.S., reaching No. 134, and generated one hit single, "A Little Love", which reached No. 37. Hart supported the album with a North American tour.

== Production ==
The album was recorded in California. The track "Ballade for Nien Cheng" was inspired by Cheng's memoir Life and Death in Shanghai. "Chase the Sun" is a re-recorded version of a track from Hart's previous album, Young Man Running. Kenny Aronoff played drums.

== Critical reception ==
Professional ratings
Review scores
Source	Rating
AllMusic	2.5/5 stars

The Toronto Star wrote that Hart's voice "is a martyr's bleat that strains for soulfulness but ends up suggesting something closer to discomfort." The Orlando Sentinel noted Hart's "continuing bid to prove Canadian MOR can be just as middle-of-the-road as American MOR."

== Track listing ==
All songs written by Corey Hart.

1. "A Little Love" - 4:09
2. "Bang! (Starting Over)" - 3:48
3. "Rain on Me" - 4:38
4. "Chase the Sun" - 3:15
5. "Diamond Cowboy" - 4:32
6. "Icon" - 3:52
7. "Can't Stand Losin' You" - 4:30
8. "Kisses on the Train" - 4:15
9. "Art of Color" - 4:17
10. "Slowburn" - 2:50
11. "Ballade for Nien Cheng" - 2:51

== Personnel ==
- Corey Hart – lead vocals, backing vocals, keyboards, acoustic piano
- Charles Judge – keyboards
- Randy Kerber – additional keyboards
- Michael Landau – guitars
- Michael Hehir – additional guitars
- John Pierce – bass
- Kenny Aronoff – drums, percussion, additional backing vocals (1)
- Gerald Albright – saxophones
- Jimmy Z. – harmonica
- Doug Cameron – violin (7)
- Greg Edward – additional backing vocals (1)
- Ruby Turner – backing vocals

Production

- Corey Hart – producer
- Greg Edward – producer, recording, mixing
- Matt D'Arbanlay-Butler – engineer
- Jeff Poe – assistant engineer
- Andy Udoff – assistant engineer
- Toby Wright – assistant engineer
- Bob Ludwig – mastering at Masterdisk (New York City, New York)
- Julia Eisenthal – album coordinator
- Henry Marquez – art direction
- Erika Gagnon – art direction, design
- Dewey Nicks – photography
