= Rob Quartly =

Canadian music video & TV director

- Born: Robert Quartly

Robert Quartly is a Canadian music video, television and commercial director. During the 1980s, Quartly produced numerous Juno Award-winning music videos for artists, including Corey Hart, Gowan, Platinum Blonde and Rush. As both a director and a producer, he gave birth to Canada's music video production industry. Quartly has been recognized with JUNOs, CFTA personal achievement awards and his induction as the first member of the Much Music Hall of Fame.

His activity in the advertising industry has been equally successful with recognition at Cannes, Toronto and New York Art Directors Club, Bessies, Clios, One Show, Marketing Awards.

Television projects have seen him direct The Vacant Lot series, act as co-creator of the CBC show "The Triple Sensation", and create/direct/executive produce the CHUM comedy series "And Go,!"

Quartly is represented by Sugino Studio based in Toronto, Ontario.

== Selected videography ==
=== Music videos ===
- 1980 – "Jealous Girl" – The Extras
- 1982 – "Nova Heart" – Spoons
- 1983 – "Don't Walk Past" – Blue Peter
- 1983 – "Melody" – Boys Brigade
- 1983 – "Passion of Love" – Boys Brigade
- 1983 – "First Time for Everything" – Coney Hatch
- 1983 – "Shake It" – Coney Hatch
- 1983 – "Sunglasses at Night" – Corey Hart
- 1983 – "It Ain't Enough (version 1)" – Corey Hart
- 1983 – "Found You Out" – Drivers
- 1983 – "Stolen Treasure" – Drivers
- 1983 – "Talk All Night" – Drivers
- 1983 – "Tears on My Anorak" – Drivers
- 1983 – "Information" – Eric Martin
- 1983 – "A Little Good News" – Ann Murray
- 1983 – "Old Emotions" – Spoons
- 1984 – "I Wanna Go Back" – Billy Satellite
- 1984 – "Hold on to 18" – Black 'n Blue
- 1984 – "It Ain't Enough (version 2 for U.S.)" – Corey Hart
- 1984 – "Call of the Wild" – Gary O'
- 1984 – "Rock You" – Helix
- 1984 – "I Want You Back" – Sherry Kean
- 1984 – "Doesn't Really Matter" – Platinum Blonde
- 1984 – "Standing in the Dark" – Platinum Blonde
- 1985 – "Talk Talk" – Arrows
- 1985 – "Never Surrender" – Corey Hart
- 1985 – "Cryin' Over You" – Platinum Blonde
- 1985 – "Everything in My Heart" – Corey Hart
- 1985 – "A Criminal Mind" – Gowan
- 1985 – "Strange Animal" – Gowan
- 1985 – "The Big Money" – Rush
- 1986 – "Situation Critical" – Platinum Blonde
- 1986 – "Chains" – Arrows
- 1986 – "Heart of the City" – Arrows
- 1986 – "Cosmetics" by Gowan
- 1986 – "Don't Forget Me (When I'm Gone)" by Glass Tiger
- 1986 – "Eurasian Eyes" – Corey Hart
- 1986 – "Angry Young Man" – Corey Hart
- 1986 – "Can't Help Falling in Love" – Corey Hart
- 1986 – "Harmony" by Ian Thomas
- 1987 – "This Mourning" – Chalk Circle
- 1987 – "Dancin' with My Mirror" – Corey Hart
- 1987 – "Awake the Giant" – Gowan
- 1987 – "Moonlight Desires" – Gowan
- 1987 – "Easy to Tame" – Kim Mitchell
- 1988 – "Come Back to Me" – Barney Bentall
- 1989 – "I Can't Take It" – Billy Newton-Davis
- 1990 – "Where Does My Heart Beat Now" – Celine Dion
- 1992 – "92 Days of Rain" – Corey Hart

=== Other works ===
- 1993 – "The Vacant Lot" – TV Series
- 2004 – And Go! – TV series
- 2005 – "Milk Skaters" – commercial for Dairy Farmers of Canada, Ontario
- 2008 – Schneiders – commercial

== Awards ==
- 1984 – Winner – Juno Award for Video of the Year – for "Sunglasses at Night" by Corey Hart
- 1984 – Nominated – Juno Award for Video of the Year – for "I Want You Back" by Sherry Kean
- 1984 – Nominated – Juno Award for Video of the Year – for "Doesn't Really Matter" by Platinum Blonde
- 1984 – Nominated – Juno Award for Video of the Year – for "Standing in the Dark" by Platinum Blonde
- 1985 – Winner – Juno Award for Video of the Year – for "Criminal Mind" by Gowan
- 1985 – Nominated – Juno Award for Video of the Year – for "Strange Animal" by Gowan
- 1985 – Nominated – Juno Award for Video of the Year – for "Never Surrender" by Corey Hart
- 1986 – Nominated – Juno Award for Video of the Year – for "Cosmetics" by Gowan
- 1986 – Nominated – Juno Award for Video of the Year – for "Don't Forget Me (When I'm Gone)" by Glass Tiger
- 1986 – Nominated – Juno Award for Video of the Year – for "Harmony" by Ian Thomas
- 1987 – Nominated – Juno Award for Video of the Year – for "Easy to Tame" by Kim Mitchel
- 1990 – Winner – "Hall of Fame Award" – Canadian Music Video Awards (CMVAs) (now known as the MuchMusic Video Awards)
- Winner – Personal Achievement award – Canadian Film & Television Producers Association
