= Fields of Fire (album) =

Studio album by Corey Hart
- Released: 16 September 1986
- Recorded: 1985–1986
- Studios: Revolution Studios (Cheshire, UK); Le Studio (Morin-Heights, Québec, Canada)
- Genres: Pop; Rock
- Length: 52:27
- Labels: Aquarius (Canada); EMI America (United States)
- Producers: Corey Hart; Phil Chapman

Corey Hart chronology
Boy in the Box (1985)	Fields of Fire (1986)	Young Man Running (1988)

Singles from Fields of Fire
- 1. "I Am By Your Side" Released: September 1986; 2. "Angry Young Man" Released: September 1986; 3. "Can't Help Falling In Love" Released: November 1986; 4. "Dancin' With My Mirror" Released: February 1987; 5. "Take My Heart" Released: May 1987

Fields of Fire is the third album by Corey Hart, released in 1986. CRIA-certified Double Platinum on December 4, 1986, the album generated five charted singles: "I Am By Your Side" (CAN #12 on November 1, 1986; US #18 on Nov 15, 1986), "Can't Help Falling In Love" (CAN #1 on Jan 31, 1987; US #24 on Feb 21, 1987), "Dancing With My Mirror" (CAN #33 on Apr 18, 1987; US #88 on Apr 4, 1987), "Take My Heart" (CAN #58 on July 4, 1987). A fifth single, "Angry Young Man", was released in the European market, in September 1986.

Extracted from the album, Hart's version of the 1961 Elvis Presley hit, "Cant Help Falling In Love", became his third chart-topper in Canada.

In the US, 'Fields of Fire' peaked at #55 on the Billboard 200 chart, on November 15, 1986.

== Track listing ==
All tracks are written by Corey Hart, except where noted.

No.	Title	Length
1.	"I Am by Your Side"	4:35
2.	"Dancin' with My Mirror"	4:16
3.	"Take My Heart"	4:21
4.	"Angry Young Man"	3:43
5.	"Goin' Home"	5:18
6.	"Can't Help Falling in Love" (Weiss, Perretti, Creatore)	3:24
7.	"Broken Arrow"	5:42
8.	"Political Cry"	4:04
9.	"Is It Too Late?"	4:35
10.	"Jimmy Rae"	5:30
11.	"Blind Faith"	5:59

== Personnel ==
- Corey Hart – lead and backing vocals, keyboards
- Gary Breit – keyboards, backing vocals (5)
- Jon Carin – E-mu Emulator II programming, E-mu SP-12 drum programming
- Ritchie Close – E-mu Emulator II programming (6)
- Michael Hehir – lead and rhythm guitars, sitar (3)
- Russell Boswell – bass
- Bruce Moffat – drums
- Frank Opolko – tambourine (10)
- Andy Hamilton – saxophones

== Production ==
- Corey Hart – producer
- Phil Chapman – producer, engineer
- Richie Cannata – co-producer (4, 9, 10)
- Andy MacPherson – additional engineer (6)
- Bob Ludwig – mastering at Masterdisk (New York City, New York, USA)
- Erika Gagnon – design, photography
- Guido Harari – additional photography
- Bruce Brault – management
- Bob Ramaglia – management
