= Julie Masse =

Canadian pop singer (born 1970)

- Born: June 3, 1970 (age 56)
- Origin: Greenfield Park, Quebec, Canada
- Genres: Pop music
- Occupation: Singer
- Years active: 1990–present

Julie Masse (born June 3, 1970) is a Canadian pop singer.

== Biography ==
Masse was born in Greenfield Park, Quebec. She released her self-titled debut album in 1990, a French language album that made her a star in Quebec and France, with the singles "C'est Zéro", "Billy", "Sans t'oublier" and "Prends bien garde". Her second album, À Contre Jour, followed in 1992.

In 1993, she won the Juno Award for Best New Female Artist. She married cinematographer Sylvain Brault the same year.

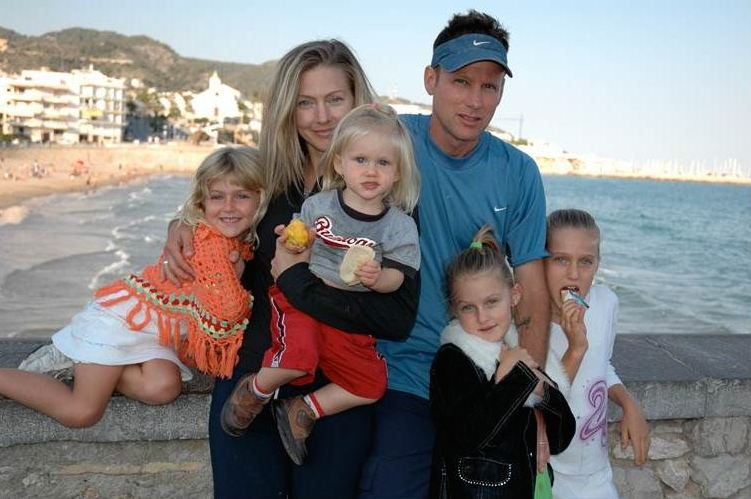
Picture of Masse and Family

In 1994, she released her debut English language album, Circle of One, on which she collaborated with Corey Hart (known for his early-1980s pop hits, such as "Sunglasses at Night"). Her relationship with Hart soon became romantic as well, and she divorced Brault in 1995.

She released a hits collection, Compilation, in 1996. She has not released another album since then, but has been a vocalist on Hart's albums and concert tours.

Hart and Masse married in 2000, and have four children together: daughters India, Dante and River, and son Rain. They now reside in The Bahamas.

== Discography ==
=== Albums ===
==== Studio albums ====
Title	Album details	Peak chart positions	Certifications
Title	Album details	CAN (QUE)	Certifications
Julie Masse	Released: 21 August 1990; Label: Victoire; Formats: CD, LP, MC	1	CAN: 2× Platinum
À contre jour	Released: 5 May 1992; Label: Victoire; Formats: CD, MC	3	CAN: Platinum
Circle of One	Released: 13 October 1994; Label: Surge; Formats: CD, MC	11	CAN: Gold

==== Compilation albums ====
Title	Album details	Peak chart positions
Title	Album details	CAN (QUE)
Compilation	Released: 16 September 1996; Label: Victoire; Formats: CD, MC	13

=== Singles ===
Title	Year	Peak chart positions			Album
Title	Year	CAN	CAN AC	CAN (QUE)	Album
"C'est zéro"	1990	—	—	3	Julie Masse
"Billy"	1990	—	—	4	Julie Masse
"Sans t'oublier"	1991	—	—	1	Julie Masse
"Prends bien garde"	1991	—	—	4	Julie Masse
"Les idées noires"	1992	—	—	1	À contre jour
"Dans les rues de nos cités" (France-only release)	1992	—	—	—	À contre jour
"À contre jour"	1992	—	—	4	À contre jour
"Comme on l'a choisi"	1992	—	—	2	À contre jour
"À quoi rêvent les millionnaires"	1993	—	—	13	À contre jour
"Tu peux t'en aller"	1993	—	—	11	À contre jour
"One More Moment"	1994	23	5	1	Circle of One
"Letting Go"	1995	57	12	26	Circle of One
"Love Is All I'm Looking For"	1995	—	20	46	Circle of One
"Là-bas" (with Corey Hart)	1998	—	—	1	Jade (by Hart)
"—" denotes releases that did not chart or were not released in that territory.
