= Sunglasses at Night =

Single by Corey Hart

from the album First Offense
- B-side: "At the Dance"
- Released: January 21, 1984 (US)
- Studio: London, England
- Genre: Synth-pop; new wave
- Length: 5:20 (LP version); 3:53 (7-inch version)
- Label: Aquarius (Canada); EMI America (worldwide)
- Songwriter: Corey Hart
- Producers: Jon Astley; Phil Chapman

Corey Hart singles chronology
"Ooh Baby!" (1976)	"Sunglasses at Night" (1984)	"It Ain't Enough" (1984)

Music video
- "Sunglasses at Night" on YouTube

"Sunglasses at Night" is a song by Canadian singer Corey Hart. It was released on November 11, 1983, as the first single from his debut album, 1983's First Offense, and became a chart hit, rising to number seven on the US Billboard Hot 100 and entering the top 40 in Australia, Canada, New Zealand, and West Germany. The song combines an unflagging synthesizer hook, characteristic arpeggio, rock guitar and cryptic lyrics. AllMusic has since described it as "an instant classic with its distinctive melody and catchy chorus".

According to co-producer Phil Chapman, the recording sessions for the album took place in a studio with air conditioning/heating vents directly above the mixing console. Air from the vents blew directly into the faces of the control room personnel, so they often wore sunglasses to protect their eyes. Hart, working on a new song, began to improvise lyrics that included the line "I wear my sunglasses at night."

== Composition ==
The song is performed in the key of B♭ minor in common time with a tempo of 127 beats per minute. Hart's vocals span from F_{3} to A♭_{4}. The song’s synthesizer riff uses a descending upper-leading tone sequence through the chords B♭m, Gdim, G♭, and B♭m (the G♭ resolving to the F in this chord).

== Music video ==
The music video, directed by Rob Quartly, shot at the Don Jail in Toronto, reflects the vision of a "fashion" police state, with scenes of Hart in a prison cell, without sunglasses, being strong-armed by police officers and paraded past various citizens wearing their regulation shades. Near the end of the video, Hart is taken to the office of a female police officer (who releases Hart in the song's end), played by Laurie Brown, who later became the host of The NewMusic as well as a VJ on MuchMusic. This video uses the shorter single version instead of the longer album version.

== Charts ==
=== Weekly charts ===
Chart (1984)	Peak position
Australia (Kent Music Report)	16
Canada Top Singles (RPM)	24
Netherlands (Single Top 100)	48
New Zealand (Recorded Music NZ)	17
US Billboard Hot 100	7
US Dance Club Songs (Billboard)	62
US Mainstream Rock (Billboard)	15
US Cash Box Top 100	7
West Germany (GfK)	21

=== Year-end charts ===
Chart (1984)	Rank
Australia (Kent Music Report)	94
Canada Top Singles (RPM)	100
US Billboard Hot 100	36
US Cash Box Top 100	62

== Covers and media ==
In 2002, a remix by the Canadian and Finnish duo Tiga and Zyntherius peaked at number 25 on the UK singles chart. British grime artist Skepta released a 2009 version that sampled the original, which reached number 64 on the same chart.

The song was featured in the 2002 video game Grand Theft Auto: Vice City on the fictional in-game radio station Wave 103. NME journalist Mark Beaumont credited the game for increasing awareness of the original 1980s version. The track plays a significant role in the 2022 film Nope, including a slowed remix on the film's soundtrack by Michael Abels.

In 2015, the Finnish hard rock supergroup The Local Band released a cover of the song, with Alexi Laiho as a member of the band. In 2024, German-American model and television host Heidi Klum released a cover with production by Dutch DJ and record producer Tiësto.

In 2026, American metalcore band Motionless in White released a cover of the song on their seventh studio album, Decades.
