= Attitude & Virtue =

Studio album by Corey Hart
- Released: 25 April 1992
- Recorded: 1991–1992
- Studios: Conway Studios and Post Logic Studios (Hollywood, California); The Hit Factory and Skyline Studios (New York City, New York)
- Genres: Pop; Rock
- Length: 44:35
- Label: Sire
- Producers: Corey Hart; Tom Lord-Alge; Richard Perry

Corey Hart chronology
Singles (1991)	Attitude & Virtue (1992)	Corey Hart (1996)

Professional ratings
Review scores
Source	Rating
AllMusic	2/5 stars

Attitude & Virtue is the sixth album by Corey Hart, released in 1992 by Sire Records. It generated four charting singles. It was first released in Japan on 25 April, before being released in Canada on 28 April.

== Background ==
The opening song, "Back in the Hand", is about Hart's rise as a young artist and later decline in popularity. "The song is autobiographical, sort of a positive statement from me", he told the Vancouver Sun. Hart added, "It's a song that I sit back and say, 'There are going to be peaks and valleys'."

The album as a whole was inspired by Hart's travels through Asia and Africa. The song "She's Everywhere" is a tribute to the worldwide popularity of singer-songwriter Madonna, while "Poster" expresses the anger and frustration Hart felt in China when he observed people his age whose individual choices were repressed for the collective good.

== Track listing ==
All songs written and arranged by Corey Hart.

1. "Back in the Hand" - 4:15
2. "Love and Money" - 4:09
3. "Baby When I Call Your Name" - 4:03
4. "She's Everywhere" - 4:20
5. "I Want (Cool Cool Love)" - 4:03
6. "Always" - 4:26
7. "Poster" - 4:09
8. "92 Days of Rain" - 5:46
9. "Without Your Love" - 4:51
10. "Sonnets from the Portuguese" - 4:33
11. "Baby When I Call Your Name" (instrumental version) - 4:03 (bonus track for Japanese release only)

== Personnel ==
- Corey Hart – vocals, backing vocals, acoustic piano (2–10)
- Jeff Bova – keyboards (1), acoustic piano (1)
- Greg Phillinganes – keyboards (2–10), Hammond organ (2–10)
- Simon Franglen – Synclavier, Synclavier programming (6)
- Tim Pierce – electric guitars, acoustic guitars, slide guitar, mandolin, sitar
- Marty Walsh – guitars (6)
- John Pierce – bass
- Kenny Aronoff – drums, percussion
- Gerald Albright – saxophones
- Ruby Turner – backing vocals
- Terence Trent D'Arby – additional vocals (2)
- Anna Lacazio – additional vocals (5)
- Duff McKagan – additional vocals (8)
- Jane Siberry – additional vocals (10)

== Production ==
- Corey Hart – producer (1–5, 7–10), associate producer (6)
- Tom Lord-Alge – producer (1–4, 9)
- Richard Perry – producer (6)
- Simon Franglen – associate producer (6)
- Shirley Divers – project coordinator
- Julie Larson – project coordinator
- Lisa Longville – project coordinator
- Erika Gagnon – art direction, design
- Peggy Sirota – photography
- Larry Frazin – management
- Larry Tollin – management
- Platinum Management, Inc. – management company

Technical credits

- Bob Ludwig – mastering at Masterdisk (New York City, New York)
- Tom Lord-Alge – engineer (1–4, 9), mixing (1–4, 7–9)
- Simon Franglen – engineer (6)
- Brian Malouf – mixing (6)
- Patrick Dillett – additional engineer (1–4, 9), engineer (5, 7, 8, 10), mixing (5, 10)
- Stephen Stewart-Short – additional engineer (6)
- Marnie O'Reilly – assistant engineer (1–5, 7–10)
- Michael Gilbert – mix assistant
- Katherine Miller – mix assistant
- Joe Perrera – mix assistant
- David Shiffman – mix assistant
