= Boy in the Box (album) =

Studio album by Corey Hart
- Released: June 14, 1985
- Recorded: 1984–1985
- Studios: Le Studio, Morin Heights, Quebec
- Genres: New wave; pop rock
- Length: 42:22
- Labels: Aquarius - 46166; EMI America
- Producers: Phil Chapman, Jon Astley, Corey Hart

Corey Hart chronology
First Offense (1983)	Boy in the Box (1985)	Fields of Fire (1986)

Singles from Boy in the Box
- 1. "Never Surrender" Released: 8 June 1985; 2. "Boy in the Box" Released: Sept. 1985; 3. "Everything in My Heart" Released: Nov. 1985; 4. "Eurasian Eyes" Released: 1986

Professional ratings
Review scores
Source	Rating
Allmusic	4/5 stars

Boy in the Box is the sophomore album by Canadian singer Corey Hart, released in 1985. The album generated four charted singles: "Never Surrender" (CAN #1 (4 weeks) beginning July 6, 1985; US #3 on Aug 17, 1985), title-track "Boy In the Box" (CAN #7 on Oct 12, 1985; US #26 on Nov 2, 1985), "Everything In My Heart" (CAN #1 on Jan 18, 1986; US #30 on Feb 1, 1986), and "Eurasian Eyes" (CAN #29 (3 weeks) beginning Mar 22, 1986).

On February 1, 1986, Hart became the second-ever Canadian artist (after Bryan Adams) to be awarded a Diamond disc from the CRIA (now Music Canada), as 'Boy In The Box' was certified for shipping one million units within his homeland alone.

Hart's single, "Never Surrender", was CRIA-certified Platinum on August 1, 1985. It also won a Juno Award, in November 1985, for "Single of the Year", and reached #1 on the US 'Hot 100 Sales' chart.

"Everything In My Heart", Hart's second #1 single from the album, was pressed in translucent red vinyl and its b-side featured a live recording of the seasonal Gene Autry Christmas classic, "Rudolph the Red Nosed Reindeer". The single was CRIA-certified Gold on January 29, 1986.

In the Spring of 1986, Hart's "Eurasian Eyes" was featured in the soundtrack of the Mickey Rourke and Kim Basinger-starring, Adrian Lyne-directed erotic-romantic flick, '9 1/2 Weeks'. Hart had written the song for graphic designer and photographer, Erika Gagnon, who was his girlfriend at the time.

Each single from the album featured music videos which garnered heavy-rotation airplay on both MuchMusic and MTV. Additionally, "Komrade Kiev" was a popular video in both North America and in Europe, but it wasn't officially released as a single.

== Track listing ==
All songs written by Corey Hart, except as noted.

1. "Boy in the Box" - 4:26
2. "Komrade Kiev" - 4:17
3. "Never Surrender" - 4:56
4. "Sunny Place, Shady People" - 4:18
5. "Eurasian Eyes" - 5:28
6. "Everything in My Heart" - 4:50
7. "Silent Talking" - 4:35
8. "Waiting for You" - 5:14
9. "Water from the Moon" - 3:42 (Hart, Russell Boswell)

== Charts ==
Chart (1985)	Peak position
Australia (Kent Music Report)	35
US Billboard 200	20

== Personnel ==
- Corey Hart – lead and backing vocals
- Gary Breit – keyboards
- Jon Astley – Fairlight programming, Oberheim DMX programming
- Michael Hehir – lead and rhythm guitars
- Russell Boswell – bass
- Bruce Moffet – percussion
- Andy Hamilton – saxophones
- Virgil Night – additional backing vocals on "Boy in the Box"
- Dalbello – additional backing vocals on "Sunny Place - Shady People"

== Production ==
- Corey Hart – producer
- Jon Astley – producer, engineer
- Phil Chapman – producer, engineer
- Bob Ludwig – mastering at Masterdisk (New York City, New York, USA)
- Henry Marquez – art direction
- Michael Hodgson – design
- Nels Israelson – front cover photography
- John Webber – back cover photography
- Bruce Brault – management

== Certifications ==
On February 1, 1986, Boy in the Box was certified diamond by Music Canada.
