= Never Surrender (Corey Hart song) =

1985 single by Corey Hart

Single by Corey Hart

from the album Boy in the Box
- B-side: "Water from the Moon"
- Released: June 7, 1985
- Studio: Le Studio (Quebec)
- Length: 4:58
- Label: Aquarius
- Songwriter: Corey Hart
- Producers: Phil Chapman; Jon Astley; Corey Hart

Corey Hart singles chronology
"Lamp at Midnite" (1985)	"Never Surrender" (1985)	"Boy in the Box" (1985)

Music video
- "Never Surrender" on YouTube

"Never Surrender" is a song written and performed by Canadian singer Corey Hart. It was released on June 7, 1985, as the lead single to his second studio album Boy in the Box (1985).

In Canada, the song topped the RPM 100 Singles chart for four consecutive weeks and was the most played song of 1985 on Canadian radio. In the United States, it became his highest-charting single on the Billboard Hot 100, peaking at number three in August 1985. "Never Surrender" would later receive the Juno Award for Single of the Year at the Juno Awards of 1985 and has been certified Platinum in Canada by Music Canada for physical sales of over 100,000 copies.

In 2019, Hart released an updated version of the song on his EP Dreaming Time Again, performed as a slow piano ballad with a new "angels lead you home" coda. He released the new version as a single in 2020, highlighting its message of hope and resilience during the COVID-19 pandemic.

== Composition ==
On the lyrical content, Hart said, "My mother influenced me with this ethic of never quitting on yourself or your dreams no matter how challenging or daunting. I also greatly admired Sir Winston Churchill, reading many biographies on his life. He used this expression 'Never Surrender' during the dark days of the Nazi attacks on Great Britain as a motivating inspiration for his countrymen."

== Critical reception ==
Dave Sholin of the Gavin Report rated it positively, saying Corey returns "even more force on a record that convinces me he is one of the mainstay singer/songwriters of the 80's." Stephen Thomas Erlewine of AllMusic, in a retrospective review for Boy in the Box, has since called "Never Surrender": "a soaring power ballad of empowerment, giving this album (Boy in the Box) a greater musical and emotional range than his (Hart's) debut." Regarding the song becoming another US hit single, Hart said "I really think it's difficult breaking into America regardless of where you're from. I don't think it's any more difficult for a Canadian act than for a band from Oklahoma".

== Music video ==
The music video features a story line of Hart leaving his home after an argument with his father and hitchhiking his way to a major city where he finds himself alone and ends with a 'live' performance with his band. Portions of the video were filmed on Yonge Street, Spadina Avenue and Queen Street West in downtown Toronto, including the now defunct Crest Grill. The video's director, Rob Quartly, had worked with Hart on three previous music videos and Quartly was again nominated for a Juno Award for his work on this video.

== Usage in media ==
"Never Surrender" has been featured in the Hulu series Future Man Episode 10 "Operation: Natal Attraction", the Netflix series Stranger Things, season 3, episode 1 "Suzie, Do You Copy?", The Goldbergs, season 7, episode 13 "Geoff the Pleaser", and in the Disney+ animated series What If...?, season 2, episode 2 "What If... Peter Quill Attacked Earth's Mightiest Heroes?".

== Track listing ==
7-inch single

1. "Never Surrender" – 4:23
2. "Water from the Moon" – 3:28

== Personnel ==
- Corey Hart – vocals
- Gary Breit – keyboards
- Jon Astley – Fairlight programming, Oberheim DMX
- Michael Hehir – guitars
- Russell Boswell – bass
- Bruce Moffet – percussion
- Andy Hamilton – saxophone
- Marilyn Martin – backing vocals

== Charts ==
=== Weekly charts ===
Weekly chart performance for "Never Surrender"
Chart (1985)	Peak position
Australia (Kent Music Report)	20
Canada Retail Singles (The Record)	1
Canada Top Singles (RPM)	1
New Zealand (Recorded Music NZ)	38
US Billboard Hot 100	3
US Adult Contemporary (Billboard)	8
US Adult Contemporary (Gavin Report)	9
US Top 40 (Gavin Report)	3
US Adult Contemporary (Radio & Records)	6
US AOR/Hot Tracks (Radio & Records)	6
US Contemporary Hit Radio (Radio & Records)	3
West Germany (GfK)	37

=== Year-end charts ===
Year-end chart performance for "Never Surrender"
Chart (1985)	Position
Canada Top Singles (RPM)	1
US Billboard Hot 100	44
US Adult Contemporary (Gavin Report)	58
US Top 40 (Gavin Report)	26
US Adult Contemporary (Radio & Records)	49
US AOR Tracks (Radio & Records)	73
US Contemporary Hit Radio (Radio & Records)	23

== Certifications ==
Certifications for "Never Surrender"
Region	Certification	Certified units/sales
Canada (Music Canada)	Platinum	100,000^{^}
^{^} Shipments figures based on certification alone.
