= Jon Astley =

British record producer (born 1951)

- Born: 1951 (age 74–75)
- Genres: Rock
- Occupations: Record producer; mastering engineer; musician

Jon Astley (born 1951) is a British record producer and mastering engineer. He is best known for his co-production work with Glyn Johns on the Who's eighth studio album Who Are You (1978), and later remastering supervision for all of the group's back catalogue reissues.

He also has produced albums for Eric Clapton, Barclay James Harvest, Corey Hart, and Deborah Harry and has mastered records for the Who, ABBA, George Harrison, Tori Amos, Eric Clapton, the Rolling Stones, the Pretty Things, Jools Holland, Tom Jones, Judas Priest, Cloven Hoof, Emmylou Harris, Ella Guru, Damien Dempsey, Tears for Fears, Led Zeppelin, Hothouse Flowers, Level 42, the Boomtown Rats, John Mayall, Marilyn Martin, Toto, Norah Jones, Stereophonics, KT Tunstall, Van Morrison, Paul McCartney, Peter Gabriel, Slade, Sting, Bono, Starlite Campbell Band and Anathema.

Astley also recorded and released two studio albums as a singer-songwriter in the late 1980s. His most commercially successful song was "Jane's Getting Serious", later popularized by a Heinz ketchup television commercial starring a pre-Friends Matt LeBlanc.

== Personal life ==
Astley is the son of composer Edwin "Ted" Astley. His sister Virginia Astley is a singer songwriter, and his other sister Karen was formerly married to Who guitarist Pete Townshend. He is married to novelist Judy Astley.

== Discography ==
=== Studio albums ===
- Everyone Loves the Pilot (Except the Crew) (1987)
- The Compleat Angler (1988)

=== Singles ===
Year	Title	Chart positions				Album
Year	Title	US Hot 100	US Modern Rock	US Mainstream Rock	NZ Top 50 Singles	Album
1987	"Jane's Getting Serious"	77	–	7	35	Everyone Loves the Pilot (Except the Crew)
1988	"Put This Love to the Test"	74	3	–	-	The Compleat Angler
