= Corey Hart (singer) =

Canadian musician (born 1962)

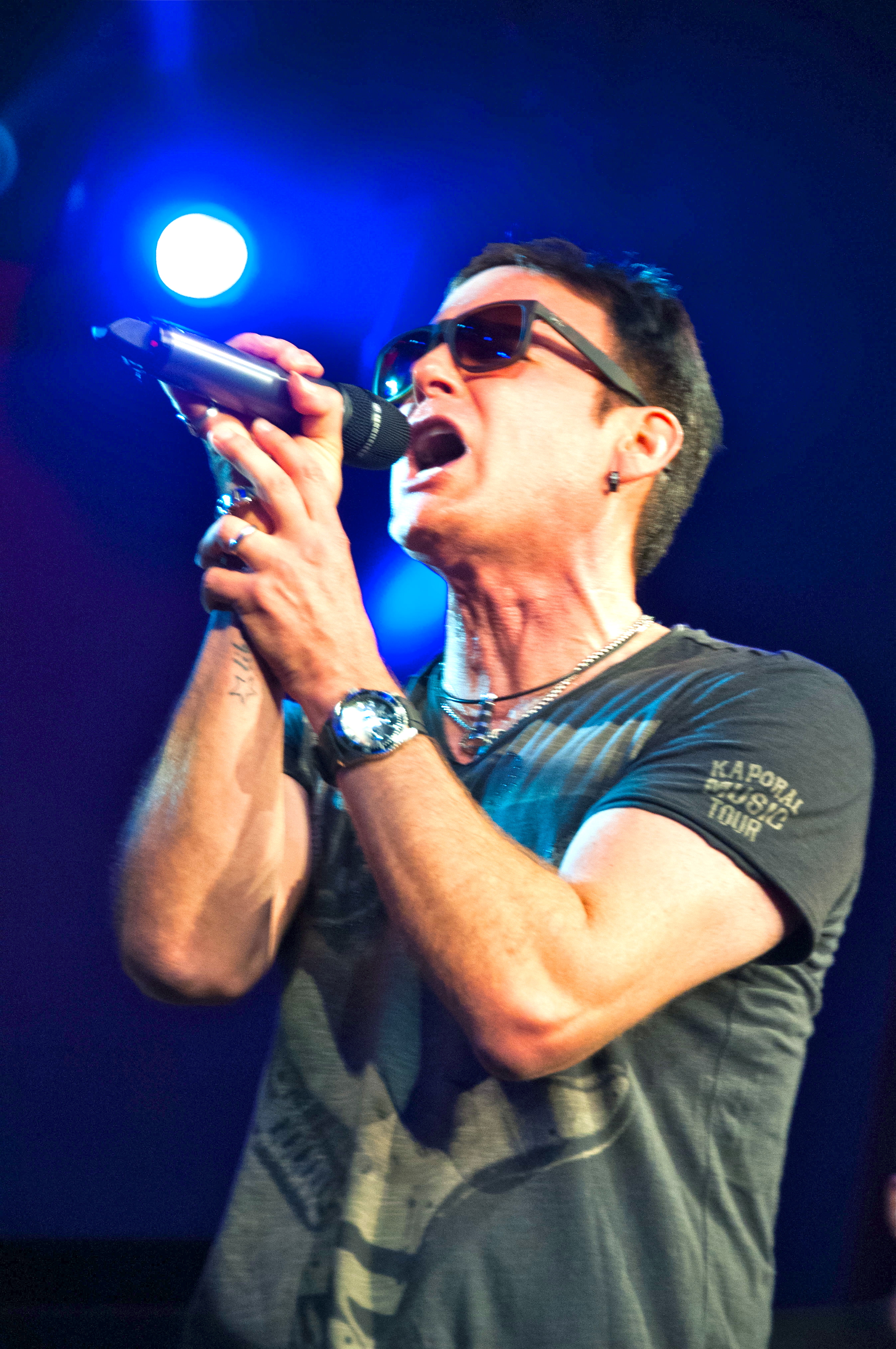
- Hart in 2012

Background information
- Born: Corey Mitchell Hart; May 31, 1962 (age 64); Montreal, Quebec, Canada
- Genres: Pop rock, adult contemporary
- Occupations: Singer, musician, songwriter
- Instruments: Vocals, keyboards, piano, guitar, drums
- Years active: 1980–present
- Labels: Aquarius, EMI America, Capitol, Sire, Columbia, Warner Music Canada
- Website: coreyhart.com

Corey Mitchell Hart (born May 31, 1962) is a Canadian singer, musician and songwriter known for his hit singles "Sunglasses at Night", "Never Surrender" and "It Ain't Enough". He has sold over 16 million records worldwide and recorded nine US Billboard Top 40 hits. In Canada, 30 of Hart's recordings have been Top 40 hits, including 11 in the Top 10, over the course of over 35 years in the music industry. Nominated for the Grammy Award for Best New Artist in 1984, Hart is an inductee of both Canadian Music Hall of Fame and Canada's Walk of Fame, and is also a multiple Juno award nominee and winner, including the Diamond Award for his best-selling album Boy in the Box. He has also been honoured by the American Society of Composers, Authors and Publishers (ASCAP) and the Society of Composers, Authors and Music Publishers of Canada (SOCAN).

== Early life ==
Hart was born on May 31, 1962, in Montreal, Quebec, the youngest of five children of Mina (née Weber) and Robert Hart, both Montreal natives. His paternal grandfather was a Ukrainian Jewish immigrant, while his mother was from a Romanian Jewish family. Hart's parents separated when he was 10 years old. Hart then lived with his mother and older brother Robbie in Montreal. He had an especially close relationship with his mother, to whom his first album First Offense was dedicated. Hart had little contact with his father, and this is reflected in some of his compositions, such as the 1998 song "Reconcile".

Hart's first experience as a performing artist came at age 11 when he sang "Ben" for Tom Jones in Miami. He also recorded songs with Paul Anka in Las Vegas during this time period. In 1980, Hart represented Canada in the World Popular Song Festival in Tokyo (along with singer Dan Hill), marking his first public performance of original material. Back in Canada, Hart reached out to Billy Joel who was on tour in the Montreal area at the time. Joel's backup band contacted him and Hart ended up recording several demos with them in Long Island, New York. Hart worked with several other Canadian studio musicians on demos before finally signing to the Aquarius Records label in 1982 at the age of 20. Several songs on his first album, including "The World Is Fire", reflect the rejections and difficulties Hart encountered along the path to getting a recording contract.

== Recording career ==
=== "Sunglasses at Night" and First Offense ===
Hart's debut album, First Offense, was recorded at Revolution Recording Studios in Manchester, England, in the spring of 1982. It was produced by Jon Astley, then best known for his work with The Who, and Phil Chapman. Released in 1983, First Offense featured the US Billboard Top 10 hit song "Sunglasses at Night" (No. 7) and Top 20 follow-up single "It Ain't Enough" (No. 17). The album went gold in the United States and quadruple platinum in Canada. First Offense initially received a modest response upon its Canadian release. It was only after garnering US success in the summer of 1984 that he became well-known in his native Canada.

First Offense also featured guitarist Eric Clapton on the record's closing track, "Jenny Fey".

Jon (Astley, producer) felt there was one song Eric Clapton would really like. So just out of the blue he sent him the song, and lo and behold Eric Clapton was on the phone saying he wanted to play on it and asking how I would mind if he did. I didn't. Eric was the classic gentleman. Here I was, this Canadian kid in England with big-time producers doing my first album and Clapton tells me, 'It's such a pretty song, so easy to play. The type of thing I'd write myself'.

The Juno-award-winning video for "Sunglasses at Night" (directed by Rob Quartly), which featured a futuristic, Orwellian society, helped propel the popularity of the track.

Hart toured the United States and Canada extensively in 1984 and early 1985, first as a supporting act for Culture Club, April Wine, Thomas Dolby, Hall & Oates and Rick Springfield, then later as a headline performer. First Offense was nominated for Best Album of the Year at that year's ADISQ Awards in Hart's native Quebec, where the singer was also nominated for Best New Artist. First Offense won the Félix.

=== "Never Surrender", Boy in the Box and Fields of Fire ===
Hart's second album was Boy in the Box, released in June 1985, which reached Diamond status in Canada (one million copies sold) by February 1986. It was the second album by a Canadian artist to do so. The album featured the hit single "Never Surrender" which spent nine consecutive weeks at No. 1 in Canada and peaked at No. 3 on the US Billboard Hot 100, also earning Hart an ASCAP Award as one of the most played songs of 1985. "Never Surrender" was the No. 2 song in the year-end Canadian charts in 1985, finishing second to the Northern Lights charity single "Tears Are Not Enough" in which Hart had also participated, alongside veteran Canadian artists Gordon Lightfoot, Neil Young, Joni Mitchell and Bryan Adams. Subsequent singles all charted in the Canadian and US Top 40 ("Boy in the Box", "Everything in My Heart" and "Eurasian Eyes"). In the US, Boy in the Box peaked at No. 20 on the Billboard 200 albums chart and went platinum.

Boy in the Box was nominated for a Juno Award as well as an ADISQ Award for Best Album, taking home a Félix for Hart in this category. "Never Surrender" won the Juno for Best Selling Single of 1985. Hart was also nominated for the Composer of the Year award at both the Junos and the ADISQ awards, winning a Félix in this field. He also received nods in the Juno categories of Best Video for "Never Surrender" and Best Male Vocalist of the Year, as well an ADISQ nomination for Concert of the Year. Hart also won the Félix for the Quebec artist achieving the most success outside Quebec in the Anglophone market, along with Best Male Artist. The following year Hart received Juno nominations for Composer of the Year and Best Selling Single for "Everything in My Heart".

In 1984 and 1985 Hart toured extensively in North America and Japan in support of Boy in the Box: Exhibition Stadium in Toronto, the Budokan in Tokyo, the Calgary Scotiabank Saddledome and the Forum in Montreal. He appeared frequently on Good Rockin' Tonite (Canada), Friday Night Videos and MTV (US), and Music Life (Japan), and toured Europe and Australasia.

Fields of Fire, Hart's third album release, came out in fall 1986 and went double platinum in Canada and achieved gold status in the US. It featured the US Top 20 hit single "I Am By Your Side", as well as the Canadian No. 1 single "Can't Help Falling in Love", originally performed by Elvis Presley. This was the first recorded cover version of a song Hart had released. The song was also a top 10 hit in the Philippines and Japan. Critics generally agreed that Fields of Fire displayed a new, more mature direction in Hart's songwriting.

With his third album, this young Canadian exhibits a growing maturity ... He's come a long way from singing about wearing 'Sunglasses at Night'.

— Boston Globe, September 1986

Fields of Fire earned Hart several nominations at the 1987 Juno Awards, in the categories of Best Male Vocalist of the Year, Best Album Graphics (done by Hart's partner Erika Gagnon), and Single of the Year for "Can't Help Falling in Love". The singer was also nominated for Best Male Artist and Album of the Year at that year's ADISQ Awards.

Once more Hart launched a world tour in support of the record. He performed sold-out concerts in Japan and made promotional appearances in Europe from fall 1986 through mid-1987. However, Hart's tour had to be halted prematurely in July 1987 after the then 25-year-old singer collapsed backstage from exhaustion after a concert in Canada. After nearly four years of constant touring and recording, he took some time off for rest and recuperation.

=== Young Man Running, Bang! and Attitude and Virtue ===
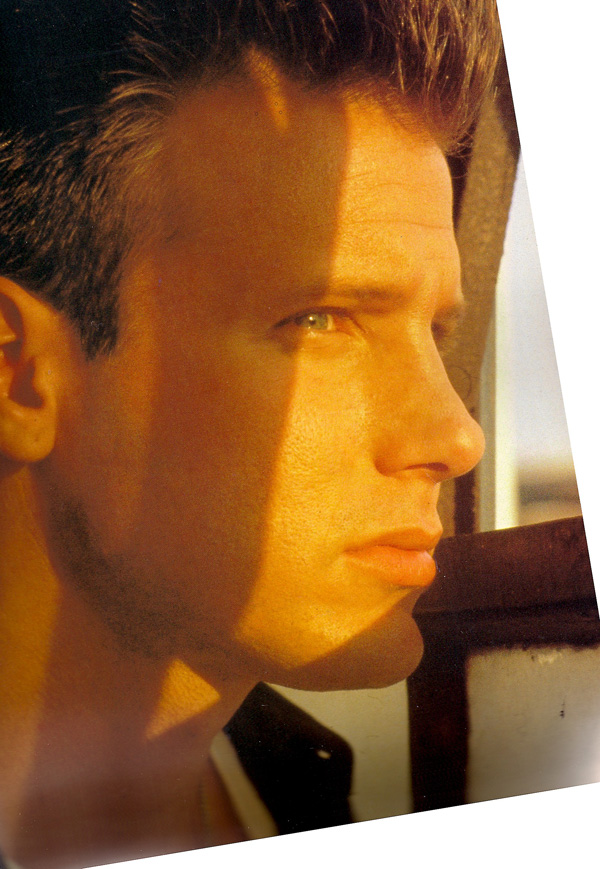
Hart in 1990

Hart returned to songwriting, leading to the singer's fourth album release, Young Man Running. Featuring the US Top 40 hit "In Your Soul" (which reached No. 2 in Canada), The album included experienced backing musicians, in particular Ruby Turner, and was largely produced by Hart himself.

His lyrics have always been serious-minded, but this time Hart's clever, obtuse artiness has given way to passages where he's actually speaking from the heart and intelligently too.

— James Muretich, Calgary Herald, July 2, 1988

Photographer Herb Ritts shot the cover and other photographs for the album. The video for "In Your Soul" featured location footage in New Mexico and Moab, Utah and was directed by Meiert Avis (U2, Bruce Springsteen).

Hart toured extensively in Japan and the Philippines in 1988, as well as in Canada's East Coast and Quebec where he spoke mostly in French. Hart again sold out the Budokan in Tokyo as well as arenas in other Japanese cities and the Ultra, a 13,000-seat venue outside Manila. Young Man Running received an ADISQ nomination for Album of the Year.

In early 1989 Hart returned to songwriting in preparation for what would be his final album with EMI America, Bang!. Recorded in Los Angeles, the release debuted in early 1990 to positive reviews and airplay on MTV. Bang! shipped platinum in Canada and hit the Japanese Top 20 two weeks into its release. The first single, "A Little Love", hit the US Top 40 in early 1990 and featured another video by Meiert Avis. Bang! also reunited Hart with Ruby Turner and featured drummer Kenny Aronoff (John Cougar Mellencamp) on drums and percussion.

Despite the success of the first single (a Top 10 hit in Canada), Bang! was less successful than previous albums in the US; EMI also failed to nominate Hart for any Juno Award categories that year. Hart was released from his contract with the company in August 1990. EMI later released a collection of Hart's singles on a compilation album, Singles in 1991. Hart did secure a nomination for Best Male Artist at the 1990 ADISQ awards.

Sire Records co-founder Seymour Stein approached Hart at this juncture and eventually signed him to Sire shortly thereafter. What followed was Hart's sole album for the label, Attitude & Virtue. Released in 1992, it appeared on the Top 40 in Canada, and featured several guest musicians including Jane Siberry, Duff McKagan of Guns N' Roses, Terence Trent D'Arby and the return of Ruby Turner. Three singles were released from the album: "Baby When I Call Your Name" (released in Canada and the United States), "92 Days of Rain" (released in Canada) and "Always" (released in Canada and the United States). All three singles charted in the Canadian Top 40. "Baby When I Call Your Name" and "92 Days of Rain" were accompanied by videos, the latter helmed by Hart's first director, Rob Quartly. The first song on the album, "Back in the Hand", summed up the prior decade in a celebration of feeling back in control of his musical career.

Hart received a Juno nomination for 1992 Best Male Vocalist of the Year. He then took a break from writing and touring ("Jane Hawtin Live", 1997). He released one single, a cover of Edith Piaf's "Hymn to Love", in 1994.

== Career rebirth ==
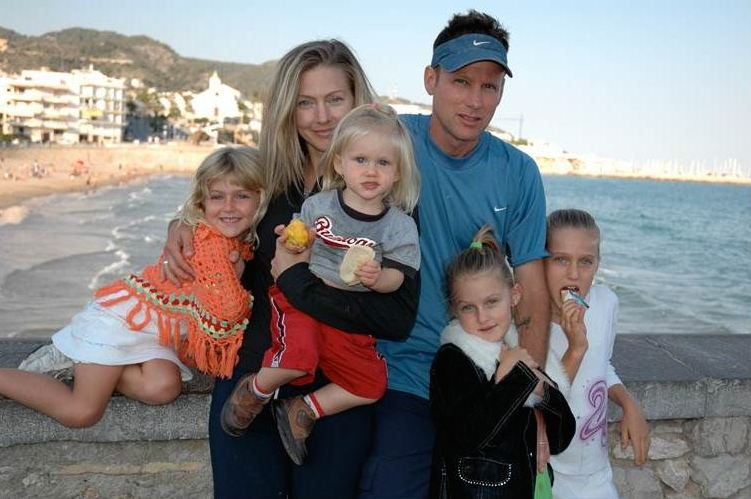
Hart family, 2007

=== Julie Masse, Corey Hart, Celine Dion and Jade ===
Hart presented an award at the Juno Awards of 1993 in Toronto with Julie Masse, a fellow nominee with two platinum selling albums in Quebec, Julie Masse and À Contre Jour. Upon seeing them together, Masse's manager suggested that Hart work with her on a new English language album. Hart co-produced and wrote five songs for Masse's gold-selling Circle of One, which was released in Canada in 1994 and marked the first time Hart had written and produced songs for an artist other than himself. This also led to their relationship as husband and wife and parents to four children. Hart was previously married to photographer/graphic designer Erika Gagnon from 1990 to 1994, and Masse to cinematographer Sylvain Brault from 1993 to 1994.

Following his work with Masse, Hart signed a new contract with Sony Music Canada and in 1996 released an eponymous CD Corey Hart. The album was co-produced by Humberto Gatica and contained some of Hart's most introspective work, spurred by his personal life changes. Sparked by the success of "Black Cloud Rain" which reached No. 2 on the Canadian Top 40, Corey Hart went platinum in Canada. The video for "Black Cloud Rain" was directed by Javier Aguilera, a young Mexican filmmaker. He toured across the country for the first time since the cancelled 1987 Fields of Fire tour, and subsequent singles from the album ("Tell Me", "Third of June" and "Someone") all reached the Canadian Top 40. Corey Hart also earned Hart more award nominations, including Juno nods for Best Male Vocalist of the Year and Best Producer for "Black Cloud Rain" and "Simplicity", a non-single album track, and Best Anglophone Quebec Artist at the ADISQ Awards.

In 1997, fellow Canadian Celine Dion released her Let's Talk About Love album, which featured the theme from the film Titanic, "My Heart Will Go On". Also on the album were two songs written and co-produced by Hart: the Canadian Top 40 hit "Miles to Go (Before I Sleep)" and "Where Is the Love". As documented in Dion's concert DVD Au cœur du stade, Dion's team reached out to Hart based on the recent success of Corey Hart in Canada and asked if he would write and produce for her. He was also nominated for the Juno Award for Best Producer for the Dion tracks. Later in 1999 Hart performed live in the US for the first time since the late 1980s as Dion's guest in St. Louis, Missouri and Ft. Lauderdale, Florida. Hart collaborated with Dion again on "Prayer", from her 2002 CD A New Day Has Come.

In 1998, Hart released a second album on Sony, Jade, featuring a duet with partner Masse on the Jean-Jacques Goldman song "Là-bas". The lead-off single "So Visible (Easy to Miss)" and follow-up release "Break the Chain" both charted in the Canadian Top 40, the singer gained yet another Juno Award nomination (for Best Male Vocalist of the Year) and Hart once again toured Canada in support of the album. After enjoying a comeback in Canada in the late 1990s, Hart again came to a personal crossroads.

All I had ever wanted or known since I was a boy was to be creating music. But I couldn't continue to record or tour if I aspired to be a 24/7 father to our children. The two worlds simply collide.

At the end of the millennium, Hart once again fell largely silent as he and Masse married and relocated to Nassau, Bahamas, to focus on raising their young family. He returned to Montreal in late 2002 for a two-night stand of concerts with the Montreal Symphony Orchestra, performing songs from Corey Hart and Jade as well as older hits to the accompaniment of the MSO.

== New directions ==
=== Siena Records and Walk in Beauty ===
In 2002, Seymour Stein of Sire Records reconnected with Hart. Stein offered Hart a boutique label with Sire/Warner Music Canada, Siena Records. The label, formed in 2003, went through several years of development while Hart pursued a suitable debut artist. He collaborated sporadically on individual songs with French-Canadian artists Garou and Wilfred Le Bouthillier in the mid-2000s, and performed with others including Meggie Lagacé on Quebec television. After an associate sent Hart a demo MP3 by little-known performer Marie-Christine Depestre, the singer, a Montreal native of Haitian descent, became Siena's first official signing.

In May 2011, Marie-Christine released her debut CD, Walk in Beauty, in Canada on Hart's label. Hart executive produced the album and wrote the bulk of the CD's songs Walk in Beauty features a cameo performance by music legend Stevie Wonder on the cover track "Keep on Runnin'" as well as a modern reworking of Hart's "Sunglasses at Night", reworked as "Girl in Shades" for Marie-Christine. Hart had refrained from granting interpolation rights to the song for over 25 years, despite requests by Sean P. Diddy Combs and Nelly Furtado. The CD also featured original compositions by Marie-Christine and its debut single, "Totally Random", became a hit in her native Quebec during the summer of 2011. To mark the launch, she and Hart engaged the media on a short promotional tour of major Canadian markets in May 2011. A second single, "Silence", was released in January 2012 to Canadian radio and a third single from the album, "Port Au Prince", debuted in May 2012.

=== 2011 relaunch ===
Starting in 2011, Hart began to increase his visibility on social media, appeared in a variety of charity events, and launched an online store featuring previously unreleased recordings.

In 2012, Hart's 30th year in the music industry, he collaborated with Canadian DJ 1Love on a remix of the song "Truth Will Set You Free" from Young Man Running. The single, "Truth Will Set U Free", was released globally to radio, and on Hart's website in June 2012 via Siena Records/Warner Music Canada. The song was Hart's first U.S. single in 20 years and Hart reunited with Meiert Avis for the video. "Truth" was originally penned for friends in the music business who were born gay, according to Hart, and disseminating the message of the song took on new resonance after 1Love approached him for permission to remix it.

With the Canadian Top 40 success of "Truth Will Set You Free", Hart made appearances at Pride celebrations in Toronto and London over the summer of 2012. IN September 2012, Hart performed to about 1.000 people at the CHUM FM "Back in the Day Bash" held at Toronto's Masonic Temple. Hart and his daughter Dante also appeared on CTV's "Marilyn Denis" chat show, where the singer performed his hit single "It Ain't Enough" live in the studio.

Hart later co-wrote and performed on a track from Canadian recording artist K-OS' album BLack on BLonde. The song, "Like a Comet (We Rollin')", was the first time Hart has performed or written in the hip hop genre. He also reworked his 1984 hit, "Sunglasses at Night", into a new interpretation called "Night Visions" with Chicago-based DJ production team Papercha$er. The single was released in October 2013.

== 2014–present ==
In April 2014, Hart released an EP, Ten Thousand Horses, on iTunes; the recording features duets with Jane Siberry and Masse, as well as previously unreleased tracks and a remake of the song "Without You" now called "Falling from Graceland".

On June 3 of that year, Hart marked the 30th anniversary of the release of his first single "Sunglasses at Night" at a farewell concert, "One Night: Three Decades of Music" in Montreal, Canada at the Bell Centre. The concert was postponed several days because of an NHL playoff run at the time by the Montreal Canadiens. Also released at the Montreal show was Hart's autobiography, Chasing the Sun: My Life in Music, which details behind-the-scenes stories of Hart's life and includes about 500 photos.

Hart then put his career mostly on hold to focus on parenting and family. However, shortly thereafter he was invited by Shania Twain to appear as part of Prince Edward Island's August 30 Founder's Week celebration. This was Hart's first visit to that province. During the show Hart did a cover version of local favorite Stompin' Tom Connors' "Bud the Spud".

Also in 2014 Hart released an acoustic version of "Face Brave", a song written for and performed by Jonathan Roy. Roy, the son of hockey player Patrick Roy, appeared onstage with Hart in PEI as well as at the June 3 farewell concert in Montreal. At a private fundraiser in Fort McMurray, Alberta in November 2014, Hart, Roy and backup singer Kim Richardson (along with Hart's band) recorded a live rehearsal performance of U2's 1992 single "One". The video was released on YouTube in November. Roy released an EP in Canada in 2016, Mr. Optimist Blues, featuring several songs written by Hart.

In 2016, Hart performed in Quebec for a national television audience during celebrations on June 24 and again during a local comedy festival on June 26.

In October 2016, Hart was honoured with a star on Canada's Walk of Fame. The induction ceremony gala was broadcast on CBC television, and in June 2017, Hart joined his fellow inductees including Jason Priestley and Darryl Sittler at the star unveiling in Toronto's Theatre District.

In July 2017, Hart returned to Calgary as a performer at the Calgary Stampede, playing to a crowd of about 11,000 at Ft. Calgary's Oxford Stomp stage. He performed in Boston a day later at a private event for longtime fans. In August he performed at Atlantic Fest in Newfoundland, his first return to the province in nearly 30 years.

A single, "Another December", was released on YouTube November 29, 2018. The song focuses on Hart's mother and the accompanying video features photos of her with family interspersed among present-day footage of Hart walking through Montreal. The video was a preview for a new EP; the title track "Dreaming Time Again" was released January 16, 2019, with an accompanying video filmed in Havana, Cuba featuring Hart's teenage son, Rain. The EP was released in the spring that year in association with Warner Brothers Music Canada, and Hart set out on a cross-country tour, beginning in St. John's, Newfoundland on May 31.

The Canadian Music Hall of Fame announced Hart's induction to its roster concomitant with the single release. Hart accepted the honour and performed live at the 2019 Juno Awards in London, Ontario, Canada on March 17, 2019. In the same year, he made a stunt appearance on the seventh season premiere of La Voix, performing his own hit song "Everything in My Heart" as a blind auditioner; he became an honorary member of Éric Lapointe's team, and made a return appearance in the finale, but was not officially a competitor.

In May 2020, Hart announced the release of a new version of his 1985 hit "Never Surrender", with the lyrics updated to reflect a message of resilience and hope during the COVID-19 pandemic.

In November 2026, he released his first novel, The Eternal Return.

== In media ==
Hart was briefly considered for the role of Marty McFly in the 1985 film Back to the Future. Producer Steven Spielberg sent Hart a copy of the script with an invitation for a screen test – a flattered Hart declined, preferring to focus on music instead of acting. Fellow Canadian Michael J. Fox eventually starred in the hit film.

During the mid-1980s, Hart was approached to record several songs for films. He mostly declined, preferring to write and record his own material; however, he did record the song "Hold On", written for the soundtrack to 1987's Beverly Hills Cop II. Hart's 1985 single, "Eurasian Eyes" (from Boy in the Box), was featured in the film 9½ Weeks and the final track from Fields of Fire, "Blind Faith", was featured in the January 16, 1987 episode of Miami Vice titled "Down for the Count, Pt. 2".

In 2002, "Sunglasses at Night" was featured in the award-winning video game Grand Theft Auto: Vice City for the Sony PlayStation 2. The song title is also a clue to the mystery in Lior Samson's debut novel, Bashert.

"Sunglasses at Night" was featured on the American horror/comedy show Scream Queens in 2015 and on the Netflix series Stranger Things in 2016. The song was also featured in a Gucci TV ad in 2017 and in the virtual showing of Balenciaga's SS 2021 collection. In 2019, "Never Surrender" was featured in Episode One, Season Three of Stranger Things.

Also in 2017, "Never Surrender" and "Sunglasses at Night", along with a storyline featuring Hart's 1985 concert tour, were featured in the Seth Rogen-produced comedy Future Man, released on Hulu on November 14. Hart himself also made a brief cameo in one episode ("Prelude to an Apocalypse") performing "Wolf", an original song written for the show.

"Sunglasses at Night" was also featured in Jordan Peele’s 2022 film Nope in a remixed format.

== Discography ==
- First Offense (1983)
- Boy in the Box (1985)
- Fields of Fire (1986)
- Young Man Running (1988)
- Bang! (1990)
- Attitude & Virtue (1992)
- Corey Hart (1996)
- Jade (1998)
- Ten Thousand Horses (2014)
- Dreaming Time Again (2019)

== Awards and nominations ==
- Canadian Music Hall of Fame, 2019 inductee for lifetime achievement in music.
- Canada's Walk of Fame, 2016 inductee for lifetime achievement in music.
- Canadian Recording Industry Association Diamond Award, Boy in the Box, January 1986 (over 1 million units sold). Hart was only the second Canadian artist to achieve this honor and BITB was the fastest-selling Diamond album to date at that time.
- Society of Composers, Authors and Music Publishers of Canada (SOCAN) "Classics" Awards for songs with over 100,000 plays on radio: "Sunglasses At Night", "It Ain't Enough", "Never Surrender", "Everything In My Heart", "I Am By Your Side", "In Your Soul", "Tell Me", and "Third of June". "Boy in the Box", "Eurasian Eyes" and "Black Cloud Rain" are also very close to passing this historic mark, likely around the end of 2012.
- In the US First Offense, Boy in the Box and Fields of Fire are all gold certified (500,000 copies of each sold). Boy in the Box is also certified platinum. In Canada First Offense went triple platinum (300,000 copies sold), and Hart achieved the aforementioned Diamond award for Boy in the Box (1 million), with a double platinum certification for Fields of Fire (200,000 sold), and platinum for Young Man Running, BANG! and Corey Hart (100,000 of each sold). Hart has also been awarded with several gold selling single awards for "Everything in My Heart", "Can't Help Falling in Love" and "Boy in the Box" and a platinum single award for "Never Surrender".

=== Juno Awards ===
- 1984 – Nominated: Best Male Vocalist of the Year, Composer of the Year (Sunglasses At Night), Single of the Year (Sunglasses At Night), Best Video (Sunglasses At Night). Won: Best Video (Sunglasses At Night)
- 1985 – Nominated: Best Male Vocalist of the Year, Composer of the Year (Never Surrender), Album of the Year (Boy in the Box), Best Selling Single (Never Surrender), Best Video (Never Surrender). Won: Best Selling Single (Never Surrender)
- 1986 – Nominated: Composer of the Year, Best Selling Single (Everything In My Heart)
- 1987 – Nominated: Best Male Vocalist of the Year, Best Album Graphics (Erika Gagnon for Fields Of Fire), Single of the Year (Can't Help Falling in Love)
- 1993 – Nominated: Best Male Vocalist of the Year
- 1997 – Nominated: Best Male Vocalist of the Year, Best Producer (Black Cloud Rain, Simplicity)
- 1998 – Nominated: Best Producer ("Miles to Go (Before I Sleep)" and "Where Is The Love" for Celine Dion)
- 1999 – Nominated: Best Male Vocalist of the Year
- 2003 – Nominated: Dance Recording of the Year (Sunglasses At Night 2002, Original 3 featuring Corey Hart)

=== ADISQ Awards ===
- 1984 – Nominated: Album of the Year (First Offense), Best New Artist. Won: Album of the Year (First Offense)
- 1985 – Nominated: Best Anglophone Quebec Artist, Composer of the Year (Never Surrender), Best Male Artist, Album of the Year (Boy in the Box), Concert of the Year (Le Spectrum Live ). Won: Best Anglophone Quebec Artist, Composer of the Year (Never Surrender), Best Male Artist, Album of the Year (Boy in the Box)
- 1986 – Nominated: Best Male Artist
- 1987 – Nominated: Best Male Artist, Album of the Year (Fields Of Fire)
- 1988 – Nominated: Album of the Year (Young Man Running)
- 1989 – Nominated: Best Male Artist
- 1990 – Nominated: Best Anglophone Quebec Artist
- 1997 – Nominated: Best Anglophone Quebec Artist

=== Other awards and nominations ===
- Gemini Awards, 1988 – Nominated: Best Variety Program and Best Performance in a Variety or Performing Arts Program or Series, Corey Hart Special, CBC TV
- Favorite Male Star, Pepsi-Cola Canada National Poll, July 1986
- CASBY Award, Male Vocalist of the Year, 1987
- Golden Gate Award, 1988, San Francisco International Film Festival – Best Variety or Performing Arts Program, Corey Hart Special, CBC TV

== See also ==
- Canadian rock
- List of diamond-certified albums in Canada
- List of people from Montreal
