= Glass Tiger discography =

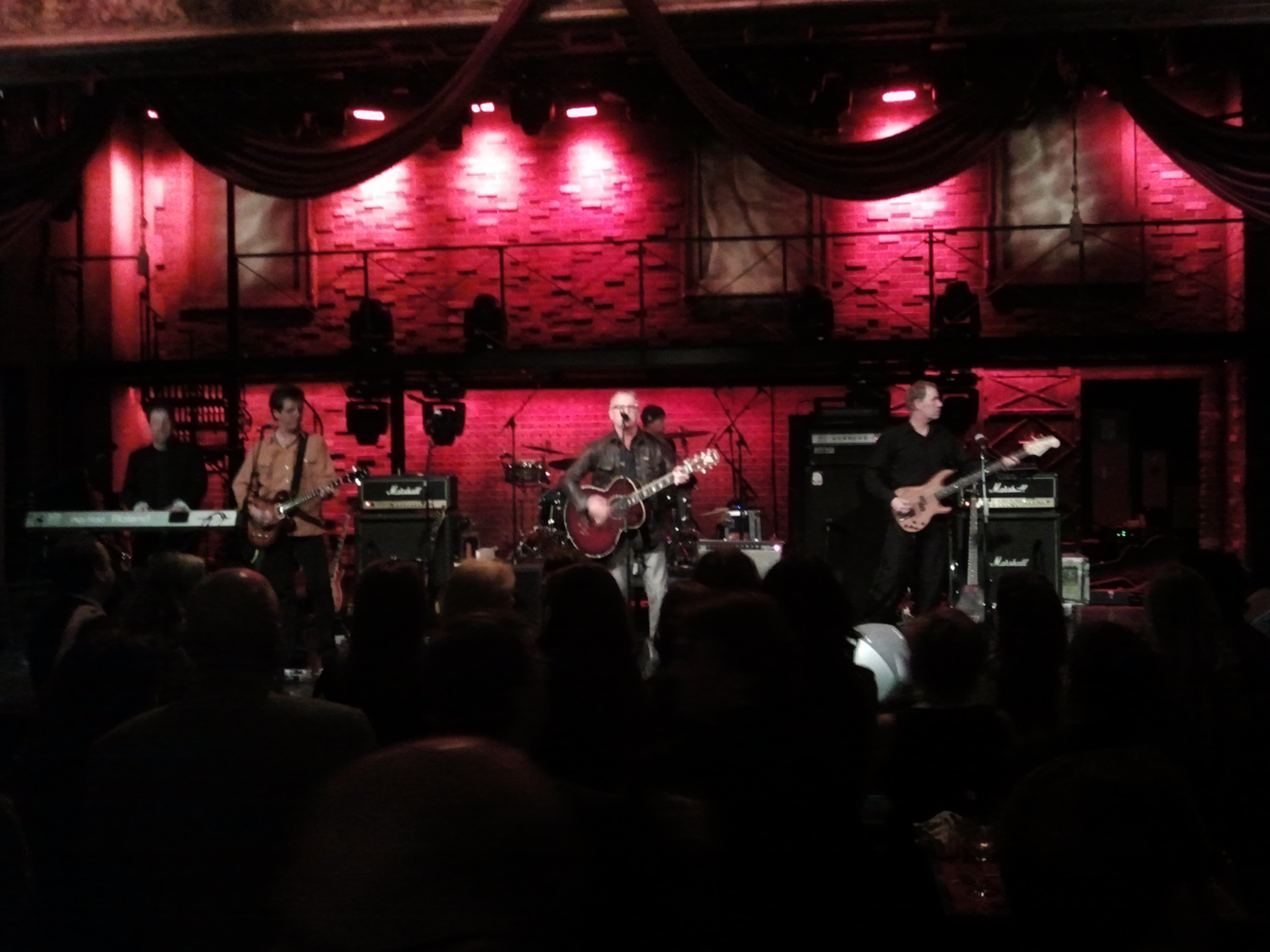
- Glass Tiger at a record company event, 2011.
- Studio albums: 3
- EPs: 2
- Compilation albums: 7
- Singles: 19
- Promotional singles: 6

Canadian rock band Glass Tiger has released three studio albums, seven compilation albums, two EPs, two live albums, nineteen singles and six promotional singles.

Glass Tiger debuted in 1986 with The Thin Red Line, which contains hit songs like "Don't Forget Me (When I'm Gone)" and "Someday", both written by Jim Vallance, the band's music producer. In the same year, their first EP, titled Special Mini Album, was released only in Germany under the seal of Toshiba EMI Ltd. In 1988, they released Diamond Sun, which was less successful than the previous one. In 1991 they published Simple Mission, which contains the single "My Town", a song played with Rod Stewart. Later came Simple Vision, their first video album in VHS format.

In 1993, they released their first compilation album, Air Time: The Best of Glass Tiger, which contains a new single called "Touch of Your Hand", their last single so far. In 1999, Back to Back was published, half of its songs are by Glass Tiger and the other half by Paul Carrack. In 2001 they released Premium Gold Collection, a compilation with 17 songs released by EMI.

Celebrating 20 years of making music, in 2005 EMI released No Turning Back: 1985–2005, an album that includes new songs such as one by the same name, "No Turning Back". In 2006, their first live album, Glass Tiger: Live in Concert, came out, and then Extended Versions came out under the Sony / BMG label. In June 2012 they released The Thin Red Line (Anniversary Edition) is in honor of 25 years of the original release. Two months later, Then... Now... Next was released a compilation with new songs under the EMI record label.

== Albums ==
=== Studio albums ===
List of studio albums, with selected chart positions and certifications
Title	Details	Peak chart positions				Certifications
Title	Details	CAN	GER	SWI	US	Certifications
The Thin Red Line	Released: June 11, 1986; Label: Capitol Records; Formats: CD, Cassette, LP	3	41	—	27	RIAA: Gold; CRIA: 4× Platinum
Diamond Sun	Released: April 13, 1988; Label: Capitol Records; Formats: CD, Cassette, LP	6	—	27	82	CRIA: 3× Platinum
Simple Mission	Released: March 22, 1991; Label: Capitol Records; Formats: CD, Cassette, LP	13	—	27	—	CRIA: Platinum
"—" Indicates that the album was not released or was not positioned in that territory.

=== Compilation albums ===
List of compilation albums, with certifications
Title	Details	Peak chart positions	Certifications
Title	Details	CAN	Certifications
Air Time: The Best of Glass Tiger	Released: 1993; Label: EMI Music Canada; Formats: CD, Cassette	–	CRIA: Gold
Back to Back	Released: August 17, 1999; Label: EMI-Capitol Special Markets; Formats: CD	–	
Premium Gold Collection	Released: April 10, 2001; Label: EMI; Formats: CD	–	
No Turning Back: 1985–2005	Released: March 1, 2005; Label: Capitol Records, EMI; Formats: CD, DVD	–	
Extended Versions	Released: November 28, 2006; Label: Sony BMG Music Entertainment; Formats: CD	–	
Then... Now... Next	Released: August 12, 2012; Label: EMI Canada; Formats: CD	–	
31	Released: February 16, 2018; Label: Halo Entertainment Group; Formats: CD, digital download	63	

=== EPs ===
List of EPs
Title	Details
Special Mini Album	Released: 1986; Label: Toshiba EMI Ltd; Formats: CD
33	Released: May 17, 2019; Label: Willow Music, Inc.; Formats: digital download

=== Live albums ===
List of live albums
Title	Details
Glass Tiger: Live	Released: March 19, 2005; Formats: CD
Glass Tiger: Live in Concert	Released: September 26, 2006; Label: Koch Records; Formats: DVD

== Singles ==
List of singles, with selected chart positions and certifications, showing year released and album name
Title	Year	Peak chart positions													Certifications	Album
Title	Year	CAN	CAN AC	AUS	GER	LUX	NED	NZ	SAF	UK	U.S. CB	US	US AC	US Rock	Certifications	Album
"Don't Forget Me (When I'm Gone)"	1986	1	—	9	32	22	40	27	8	29	3	2	30	17	CRIA: Platinum	The Thin Red Line
"Thin Red Line"	1986	19	—	91	48	—	74	—	—	—	—	—	—	—		The Thin Red Line
"Someday"	1986	14	4	97	26	18	—	—	—	66	8	7	4	—	CRIA: Gold	The Thin Red Line
"You're What I Look For"	1987	11	12	—	—	—	—	—	—	—	—	—	—	—		The Thin Red Line
"I Will Be There"	1987	29	—	—	—	—	—	—	—	—	33	34	—	21		The Thin Red Line
"I'm Still Searching"	1988	2	—	—	—	—	—	—	—	—	32	31	—	12		Diamond Sun
"Diamond Sun"	1988	5	—	—	34	—	—	—	—	78	—	—	—	—		Diamond Sun
"My Song"	1988	33	—	172	—	—	—	—	—	—	71	—	—	—		Diamond Sun
"Far Away from Here"	1988	—	—	—	—	—	—	—	—	—	—	—	—	—		Diamond Sun
"Send Your Love"	1988	—	—	—	—	—	—	—	—	—	—	—	—	—		Diamond Sun
"(Watching) Worlds Crumble"	1989	27	—	—	—	—	—	—	—	—	—	—	—	—		Diamond Sun
"Blinded"	1991	—	—	—	—	—	—	—	—	—	—	—	—	—		Simple Mission
"Animal Heart"	1991	4	—	—	—	—	—	—	—	—	—	—	—	—		Simple Mission
"Rhythm of Your Love"	1991	8	—	—	—	—	—	—	—	—	—	—	—	—		Simple Mission
"My Town" (feat. Rod Stewart)	1991	8	—	184	51	5	—	—	—	33	—	—	—	—		Simple Mission
"Rescued (By the Arms of Love)"	1991	8	30	—	—	—	—	—	—	—	—	—	—	—		Simple Mission
"Touch of Your Hand"	1993	34	—	—	—	—	—	—	—	—	—	—	—	—		Air Time: The Best of Glass Tiger
"I Take It Back"	2012	—	—	—	—	—	—	—	—	—	—	—	—	—		Then... Now... Next
"This Is Your Life"	2019	—	—	—	—	—	—	—	—	—	—	—	—	—		33
"—" denotes items which were not released in that country or failed to chart.

=== Promotional singles ===
List of singles, showing year released and album name
Title	Year	Album
"Looking at a Picture"	1986	The Thin Red Line
"Simple Mission"	1988	Simple Mission
"Give It Away"	2004	No Turning Back: 1985–2005
"No Turning Back"	2004	No Turning Back: 1985–2005
"Give Love for Christmas"	2005	Non-album single
"My Town" (Live)	2006	Glass Tiger: Live
