= Air Time: The Best of Glass Tiger =

Greatest hits album by Glass Tiger
- Released: 1993
- Recorded: 1985–1993
- Genres: Rock, pop rock
- Length: 1:12:06
- Label: Capitol
- Producers: Jim Vallance; Sam Reid; Tom Werman

Glass Tiger chronology
Simple Mission (1991)	Air Time: The Best of Glass Tiger (1993)	No Turning Back (2005)

Singles from Air Time: The Best of Glass Tiger
- 1. "Touch Of Your Hand" Released: 1993

Professional ratings
Review scores
Source	Rating
Allmusic	3/5 stars

Air Time: The Best of Glass Tiger is Glass Tiger's first Greatest Hits album. It contains all of their charting singles, both in their native Canada, and the United States from their first three studio albums. The compilation also includes two unreleased recordings: "After the Dance" and "Touch of Your Hand", this last song was released as a single: it entered in the Canadian charts and peaked at number 34 in January 1994.

Air Time: The Best of Glass Tiger was certified gold in Canada in 2005.

== Critical reception ==
AllMusic's Michael Sutton said the album "collects choice cuts from a group that is usually remembered for one song", drawing vocal comparisons of the band's singer Alan Frew to George Michael in "Don't Forget Me (When I'm Gone)" and musically similarities in "Animal Heart" with Def Leppard. However, he admits that the compilation "should've stopped with their second LP" because "by their third record, the group had become nearly unlistenable".

== Track listing ==
No.	Title	Writer(s)	Length
1.	"Don't Forget Me (When I'm Gone)"	Alan Frew; Sam Reid; Jim Vallance	4:05
2.	"Thin Red Line"	Frew; Reid; Al Connelly	4:53
3.	"Someday"	Frew; Connelly; Vallance	3:34
4.	"I Will Be There"	Frew; Michael Hanson; Connelly	3:23
5.	"You're What I Look For"	Frew; Hanson; Connelly	3:48
6.	"After the Dance"	Frew; Reid; Connelly	4:11
7.	"Diamond Sun"	Frew; Vallance	5:21
8.	"I'm Still Searching"	Frew; Reid; Hanson	3:56
9.	"My Song" (with The Chieftains)	Frew; Reid; Vallance	3:23
10.	"(Watching) Worlds Crumble"	Frew; Reid; Vallance	4:50
11.	"Animal Heart"	Connelly; Frew; Larry Dvoskin	3:49
12.	"Blinded"	Connelly; Frew; Dvoskin	4:36
13.	"Rhythm of Your Love"	Connelly; Frew	4:36
14.	"Rescued (By the Arms of Love)"	Frew; Wayne Parker; Rick Washbrook	4:13
15.	"Simple Mission"	Frew; Reid	4:34
16.	"My Town" (with Rod Stewart)	Connelly; Frew; Parker; Jim Cregan	4:48
17.	"Touch of Your Hand" (Demo Version)	Frew; Reid	4:06
Total length:			1:12:06

== Certifications ==
Certifications for Air Time: The Best of Glass Tiger
Region	Certification	Certified units/sales
Canada (Music Canada)	Gold	50,000^{^}
^{^} Shipments figures based on certification alone.
