= My Hometown (disambiguation) =

"My Hometown" is a 1984 single by Bruce Springsteen from the Born in the U.S.A. album. My Hometown may also refer to:

- "My Hometown" (Instant Star episode), 2008 TV episode
- "My Home Town", 1960 song by Paul Anka
- "Husavik (My Hometown)", 2020 song performed by Will Ferrell and My Marianne for the film Eurovision Song Contest: The Story of Fire Saga

== See also ==
- My Home (disambiguation)
- My Town (disambiguation)
- Hometown (disambiguation)
- My Home Village, 1949 Korean film
- Hometown, My Town, 1959 album by Tony Bennett
