= Ancient Evenings (disambiguation) =

Ancient Evenings may refer to:

- Ancient Evenings, a historical novel by author Norman Mailer
- "Ancient Evenings," a son by Glass Tiger from The Thin Red Line
