= My Town (Glass Tiger song) =

1991 single by Glass Tiger

Single by Glass Tiger

from the album Simple Mission
- B-side: "The Tragedy of Love"
- Released: August 1991
- Length: 4:51
- Label: Capitol; EMI
- Songwriters: Jim Cregan; Alan Frew; Alan Connelly; Wayne Parker
- Producers: Jim Cregan; Tom Werman

Glass Tiger singles chronology
"Rhythm of Your Love" (1991)	"My Town" (1991)	"Rescued (By the Arms of Love)" (1991)

Rod Stewart singles chronology
"You Are Everything" (1991)	"My Town" (1991)	"People Get Ready" (1992)

Music video
- "My Town" on YouTube

"My Town" is a song by Canadian band Glass Tiger. Released in August 1991 by Capitol and EMI Records as the fourth single from their third studio album, Simple Mission (1991), the song features British singer-songwriter Rod Stewart as an uncredited vocalist. Inspired by Celtic music, "My Town" was written by Glass Tiger bandmates Alan Frew, Alan Connelly and Wayne Parker, as well as Jim Cregan, who co-wrote two of Stewart's other hits. The song's lyrics are a tribute to Frew's hometown, Coatbridge, Scotland, and Stewart was invited to record the song with Glass Tiger because of his Scottish ancestry.

It became Glass Tiger's sixth top-10 hit in Canada, climbing to number eight on the RPM 100 Hit Tracks chart in November of the same year and ending the year as Canada's 52nd-most-successful single. In the United Kingdom, due to Stewart's appearance, the single became the band's first song to chart since "Diamond Sun" in 1988, peaking at number 33 on the UK Singles Chart. Elsewhere, "My Town" managed to chart in Germany, where it peaked at number 51.

== Background ==
"My Town" was written about Glass Tiger member Alan Frew's hometown of Coatbridge, Scotland. In an interview with Metal Express Radio, Frew said that he initially did not think to recruit Rod Stewart as a featured artist, despite spending time with him prior to the song's conception. The two men were having dinner one night when a person Stewart recognized asked Frew why he had not asked Stewart to sing on "My Town". Frew explained, "Rod asked me why he'd not been asked to sing on it and I'd said that I didn't want to play that card on him. He just said he wanted to sing on it, so he did and that's how he ended up singing on it."

== Composition and lyrics ==
Celtic singing and instrumentation were the main influences on the composition on "My Town". Despite Glass Tiger being a Canadian band, the "Scotia" in the song's lyrics does not refer to the Canadian province of Nova Scotia, but rather Scotland, which was called Scotia during the Middle Ages. One of the lyrics states that "Burlington Bertie", a music hall song composed by Harry B. Norris in 1900, will be in Frew's heart forever.

== Music video ==
The music video for the song, filmed in black-and-white, features numerous references to Scotland. However, Rod Stewart does not appear in the video nor in the recording used for this video.

== Track listings ==
- 7-inch single

A. "My Town" – 4:48
B. "The Tragedy of Love" – 4:31

- UK CD single
1. "My Town"
2. "The Tragedy of Love"
3. "Don't Forget Me (When I'm Gone)"
4. "Diamond Sun"
- UK 12-inch single

A1. "My Town"
B1. "The Tragedy of Love"
B2. "Don't Forget Me (When I'm Gone)"

== Personnel ==
Personnel are taken from the UK CD single liner notes.

Glass Tiger

- Alan Frew – writing, vocals
- Alan Connelly – writing, guitars
- Sam Reid – keyboards
- Wayne Parker – writing, electric bass

Others

- Jim Cregan – writing, production
- Rod Stewart – vocals (uncredited)
- Tom Werman – production
- Ed Thacker – mixing

== Charts ==
=== Weekly charts ===
Chart (1991)	Peak position
Australia (ARIA)	184
Canada Top Singles (RPM)	8
Europe (Eurochart Hot 100)	62
Europe (European Hit Radio)	12
Germany (GfK)	51
Luxembourg (Radio Luxembourg)	5
UK Singles (Official Charts)	33
UK Airplay (Music Week)	16

=== Year-end charts ===
Chart (1991)	Position
Canada Top Singles (RPM)	52

== Release history ==
Region	Date	Format(s)	Label(s)	Ref.
Canada	August 1991	—N/a	Capitol; EMI	
United Kingdom	October 14, 1991	7-inch vinyl; 12-inch vinyl; CD; cassette	Capitol; EMI	
Australia	February 10, 1992	CD; cassette	Capitol; EMI	
