= Someday (Glass Tiger song) =

1986 song by Glass Tiger

- 12-inch variant of standard artwork

Single by Glass Tiger

from the album The Thin Red Line
- B-side: "Vanishing Tribe"
- Released: 1986
- Recorded: 1985–1986
- Studio: Phase One Studios, Sounds Interchange, ESP Studios, Eastern Sound, & McLear Place (Toronto, Ontario); Le Studio, (Morin-Heights, Quebec); & Canada, Distorto Studios (Vancouver, British Columbia)
- Genre: Pop rock; new wave
- Length: 3:34
- Label: Capitol; Manhattan
- Songwriters: Jim Vallance; Alan Frew; Al Connelly
- Producer: Jim Vallance

Glass Tiger singles chronology
"Thin Red Line" (1986)	"Someday" (1986)	"You're What I Look For" (1987)

Music video
- "Someday" on YouTube

"Someday" is a song by Canadian pop band Glass Tiger. It was released on 1986 as the third single from their debut studio album The Thin Red Line through Capitol Records in Canada and Manhattan Records worldwide. The song was written by members Alan Frew and Al Connelly and by producer Jim Vallance. "Someday" also won a Juno Award in the category Single of the Year.

Following the success of "Don't Forget Me (When I'm Gone)", "Someday" reached No. 14 on Canada's RPM Top 100 and it was also a success in the U.S., reaching No. 7 on the Billboard Hot 100, while reaching lower positions in other countries.

== Composition ==
"Someday" is a mid-tempo pop rock ballad written by Alan Frew, Al Connelly and Jim Vallance. The track runs at 100 BPM and is in the key of D major. It runs at three minutes and thirty-seven seconds in the album version.

== Accolades ==
Year	Organization	Award	Result	Ref.
1987	Juno Award	Single of the Year	Won	

== Music video ==
The music video for "Someday" was directed by Storm Thorgerson, who had also directed the "Thin Red Line" clip previously. The clip shows Alan Frew talking with his "girlfriend" through a telephone call, alternating with scenes of the band performing the song, with two female backing vocalists.

== Track listing ==
7" single
No.	Title	Length
1.	"Someday"	3:34
2.	"Vanishing Tribe"	3:59

12" single
No.	Title	Length
1.	"Someday" (Extended Remix)	7:19
2.	"Someday" (Dub Mix)	6:26
3.	"Someday"	3:34

== Personnel ==
Credits adapted from The Thin Red Line and "Someday" liner notes.

Glass Tiger

- Alan Frew – vocals
- Al Connelly – guitars
- Sam Reid – keyboards
- Wayne Parker – bass
- Michael Hanson – drums, backing vocals

Additional musicians

- Jimmy Maelin – percussion (remix versions)

Design

- Jackie Murphy – design
- Heather Brown – design
- Beth Baptiste – photography
- Shoot That Tiger! – design, logo design
- Koppel & Scher – design

Production

- Jim Vallance – production
- Ed Thacker – mixing
- Michael Brauer – remixing
- Fernando Kral – remixing assistance

== Charts ==
=== Weekly charts ===
Chart (1986–1987)	Peak position
Australia (Kent Music Report)	97
Canada (The Record)	11
Canada (RPM)	14
Canada Adult Contemporary (RPM)	4
Germany (GfK Entertainment charts)	26
Luxembourg (Radio Luxembourg Singles)	18
UK Singles Chart	66
US Billboard Hot 100	7
US Adult Contemporary (Billboard)	4
US (Cash Box)	8
US (Radio & Records)	7

=== Year-end charts ===
Chart (1987)	Position
US Billboard Hot 100	69
US Adult Contemporary (Billboard)	50

== Certifications ==
Region	Certification	Certified units/sales
Canada (Music Canada)	Gold	50,000^{^}
^{^} Shipments figures based on certification alone.
