= Hometown =

Hometown, HomeTown, or Home Town may refer to:

- A hometown, the town where someone lives or the town that they come from, typically their place of birth.
- In developing nations particularly: native place, village of origin in newly urbanized societies.

== Film and television ==
- Hometown (film), a 1983 Japanese film
- Hometown (American TV series), a 1985 American comedy-drama adapted from the 1983 film The Big Chill
- Home Town (TV series), an American home-renovation series
- Hometown (South Korean TV series), a 2021 television series
- Hometown (Indian TV series), a 2025 Telugu-language crime drama television series

== Music ==
=== Groups ===
- HomeTown (band), a 2010s Irish boy band
- The Hometown Band, a 1970s Canadian band

=== Albums ===
- Hometown!, by the Dubliners, 1972
- Hometown (Asian Kung-Fu Generation album) or the title song, 2018
- Hometown (BamBam EP), 2025
- HomeTown (HomeTown album), 2015
- Hometown (Hush album), 1998
- Hometown (Ten Second Epic album), 2009
- Hometowns, by the Rural Alberta Advantage, 2008

=== Songs ===
- "Home Town" (song), by Joe Jackson, 1986
- "Hometown" (Sheppard song), 2018
- "Hometown", by Andy Burrows from Company, 2012
- "Hometown", by Cleopatrick from The Boys, 2018
- "Hometown", by Diplo from Diplo Presents Thomas Wesley, Chapter 1: Snake Oil, 2020
- "Hometown", by Halsey from The Great Impersonator, 2024
- "Hometown", by Kane Brown from Kane Brown, 2016
- "Hometown", by Miss Kittin and The Hacker, 2007
- "Hometown", by Neffex, 2017
- "Hometown", by Sea Girls, 2021
- "Hometown", by Twenty One Pilots from Blurryface, 2015

== Places ==
- Hometown, Illinois, United States
- Hometown, Pennsylvania, United States
- Hometown, West Virginia, United States

== Other uses ==
- AOL Hometown, a defunct web-hosting service
- HomeTown, an Indian furniture retailer owned by Future Group
