= My Home =

My Home may refer to:

== Films ==
- Mera Pind, a 2008 Punjabi romantic musical comedy film

== Music ==
- My Home (Dvořák), Můj domov, an overture by Antonín Dvořák
- "My Home" (traditional pipe tune)

=== Songs ===
- "My Home" (Kanjani Eight song), 2011
- My Home (Myles Smith song), 2023
- "My Home", 1962 song by Christine Campbell; written by Ruvin, Ladbrooke, James
- "My Home", 1988 song by Kamahl; written by Jackie Trent, Tony Hatch
- "My Home", 2012 song by Nneka
- "My Home", a song by Got7 from their 2016 album Flight Log: Turbulence
- "My Home", a song by Thousand Foot Krutch from their 2007 album The Flame in All of Us

== See also ==
- "My Hometown", a 1984 single by Bruce Springsteen
