= My Town =

My Town may refer to:

- Mytown (organization) (Multicultural Youth Tour of What's Now), a youth organization in Boston, Massachusetts, U.S.

== Music ==
- Mytown, an Irish boy band, a predecessor of the pop rock band The Script
  - Mytown (album), their self-titled album
- My Town (album), an album by Montgomery Gentry
  - "My Town" (Montgomery Gentry song), the title track
- "My Town" (Glass Tiger song), 1991
- "My Town" (Hollywood Undead song), 2011
- "My Town", a song by Buck-O-Nine from Twenty-Eight Teeth
