= My Home (traditional pipe tune) =

Traditional Scottish or Northumbrian pipe tune

"My Home" is a traditional Scottish or Northumbrian pipe tune. It is used by military bands as a march past, but a slow march contrasting with quick march pasts such as "Highland Laddie".

== Recordings ==
- 1956 Jack Armstrong on Northumbrian Pipe Music
- 1964 The Gordon Highlanders Military Band and Pipe and Drum Corps
- 1969 The Pipes And Drums Of The Tenth Princess Mary's Own Gurkha Rifles
