= Al Connelly =

Canadian guitarist (born 1960)

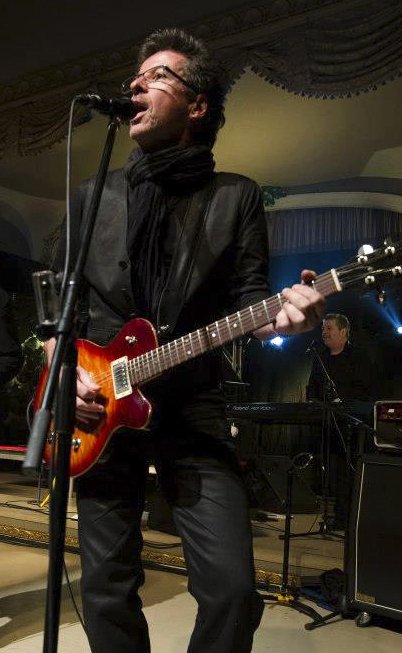
- Connelly in 2013

Background information
- Born: Alan Connelly; October 2, 1960 (age 65); Montreal, Quebec, Canada
- Genres: Rock, world music, reggae, R&B, blues, and pop
- Occupations: Songwriter, guitarist, vocalist
- Years active: 1983–present
- Member of: Glass Tiger
- Website: glasstiger.ca

Alan Connelly is a Canadian guitarist and songwriter. He is a founding member of the rock band Glass Tiger. He and his band received five Canadian music industry JUNO Awards and were nominated for Best New Artist at the 1987 Grammy Awards.

== Early life ==
Connelly attended Huron Heights Secondary School in Newmarket, Ontario.

== Career ==
In Toronto, Frew and Wayne Parker joined forces with keyboardist Sam Reid and drummer Michael Hanson, to form the band Tokyo, which later developed into Glass Tiger. Connelly was asked to join the new band in 1983.

In 1986, Glass Tiger released its first album, The Thin Red Line. The album went quadruple platinum in Canada and gold in the United States. Two of its songs, "Don't Forget Me (When I'm Gone)" and "Someday", reached the Top 10 in the U.S. charts. Glass Tiger won three 1986 Juno Awards: Album of the Year for The Thin Red Line, Single of the Year for "Don't Forget Me (When I'm Gone)", and Most Promising Group of the Year. The band won two more Juno Awards in 1987 and was nominated for a Grammy Award for Best New Artist.

The band released a second album, Diamond Sun, in 1988. The album was certified triple platinum in Canada and featured the single "I'm Still Searching", which peaked at #2 in Canada.

Glass Tiger went on hiatus in 1993. After pursuing other projects, the band reformed in 2003 with new drummer Chris McNeil and began touring again.

In 2009, Glass Tiger, including Connelly, played to the Canadian Armed Forces stationed in Kandahar, Afghanistan, and at Camp Mirage.

As of 2015, Connelly continued to write and produce solo work or with various musicians and performers in world music, reggae, R&B, blues, rock, and pop.

== Discography ==
=== Studio albums ===
- In Another Life (2004)

=== with Glass Tiger ===
- The Thin Red Line (1986)
- Diamond Sun (1988)
- Simple Mission (1991)
- 31 (2018)
- 33 (2019)
- Songs for a Winter's Night (2020)
