= The Thin Red Line (album) =

Studio album by Glass Tiger
- Released: February 17, 1986
- Recorded: 1985–1986
- Studios: Phase One Studios, Sounds Interchange, ESP Studios, Eastern Sound, McLear Place (Toronto, Ontario); Le Studio (Morin-Heights, Quebec); Distorto Studios (Vancouver, British Columbia)
- Genres: Pop, rock, pop rock
- Length: 41:59
- Labels: Capitol (Canada); Manhattan (USA)
- Producer: Jim Vallance

Glass Tiger chronology
The Thin Red Line (1986)	Diamond Sun (1988)

Singles from The Thin Red Line
- 1. "Don't Forget Me (When I'm Gone)" Released: January 27, 1986; 2. "The Thin Red Line" Released: July 21, 1986; 3. "Someday" Released: November 24, 1986; 4. "You're What I Look For" Released: February 23, 1987; 5. "I Will Be There" Released: May 4, 1987

Professional ratings
Review scores
Source	Rating
Allmusic	3.5/5 stars

The Thin Red Line is the debut album by Canadian band Glass Tiger. It was released by Manhattan Records in Canada on February 17, 1986.

The album is most famous for the single "Don't Forget Me (When I'm Gone)". The song, which featured backup vocals by Bryan Adams, reached #1 on the Canadian charts and #2 in the United States. A follow-up single, "Someday", was also successful, reaching #7 in the United States and #14 in Canada.

== Critical reaction ==
Both Greg Burliuk of the Kingston Whig-Standard and Evelyn Erskine of the Ottawa Citizen compared the album to the music of Duran Duran. Erskine dismissed the album and opined that the band "has yet to find its own musical direction", while Burliuk called the album uneven but praised the singles "Don't Forget Me", "Someday" and "You're What I Look For".

== Reception ==
The album was certified quadruple platinum in Canada and went gold in the United States.

It debuted on the RPM100 album charts in RPM the week of March 1, 1986, and peaked at #3 on the charts in the week of April 26. It remained in the top 100 for 67 weeks overall, concluding its chart run in the week of July 20, 1987. In the magazine's year-end charts, it placed as the 16th top-selling album of 1986, and the 27th top-selling album of 1987. It was named the 14th top-selling album of the year in The Record's year-end chart for 1986.

In the United States, the album peaked at #27 in the Billboard 200 in the week of February 7, 1987.

== Awards ==
At the Juno Awards of 1986, the album won the Juno Award for Album of the Year. "Don't Forget Me (When I'm Gone)" also won for Single of the Year, and the band won Most Promising Group. "Someday" won Single of the Year at the Juno Awards of 1987, the first time in the award's history that the same artist won the award in two consecutive years for singles from the same album.

At the Grammy Awards in 1987, the band were nominated for Best New Artist.

The band swept the Rock Express magazine reader's poll in 1987, winning Top Canadian Group, Top Canadian Album for The Thin Red Line, and Top Canadian Single for "Don't Forget Me".

== Track listing ==
No.	Title	Writer(s)	Length
1.	"Thin Red Line"	Alan Frew; Sam Reid; Al Connelly	4:57
2.	"Don't Forget Me (When I'm Gone)"	Frew; Reid; Jim Vallance	4:08
3.	"Closer to You"	Frew; Reid; Michael Hanson; Wayne Parker	3:37
4.	"Vanishing Tribe"	Frew; Reid; Connelly; Hanson; Parker	4:06
5.	"Looking at a Picture"	Frew; Reid; Connelly; Hanson; Parker; Gerald O'Brien	4:02
6.	"The Secret"	Frew; Reid	0:47
7.	"Ancient Evenings"	Frew; Connelly; Reid; Hanson; Parker	4:55
8.	"Ecstasy"	Frew; Reid; Connelly	4:25
9.	"Someday"	Frew; Connelly; Vallance	3:37
10.	"I Will Be There"	Frew; Connelly; Hanson	3:28
11.	"You're What I Look For"	Frew; Connelly; Hanson	3:50
Total length:			41:59

== Personnel ==
=== Glass Tiger ===
- Alan Frew – vocals
- Al Connelly – guitars
- Sam Reid – keyboards
- Wayne Parker – bass
- Michael Hanson – drums, backing vocals

=== Additional musicians ===
- Additional keyboards, background vocals: Jim Vallance
- Background vocals: Marc Lafrance, Paul Janz, Bryan Adams (on "Don't Forget Me", "I Will Be There"), Dalbello, and Sharon Lee Williams
- Additional guitars: Keith Scott
- Additional bass: Doug Edwards (on "Don't Forget Me")
- Harmonica: David Pickell
- Horns: Chase Sanborn, Charles Gray, Russ Little
- Arrangements: Glass Tiger, Jim Vallance, and Gerald O'Brien

=== Production ===
- Engineering: Mike Jones, Paul Northfield, Jim Vallance, Lorne Feld, Mike Baskerville, Hayward Parrott, and Robin Brouwers
- Assistance: Randy Staub, Angelo Civiero, Robert Digioia, and Steve Ibelshauser
- Mixing: Ed Thacker and Sam Reid ("The Secret")
- Producing on "The Secret": Sam Reid
- Mastering: Bob Ludwig
- Photography: Deborah Samuel
- Design: Heather Brown
- Cover Concept Deborah Samuel and Dal Heslip
- Logo: Shoot That Tiger!

== Charts ==
Chart (1986-87)	Peak position
Australian Albums (Kent Music Report)	87
Canada Top Albums/CDs (RPM)	3
German Albums (Offizielle Top 100)	41
US Billboard 200	27

== Certifications ==
Region	Certification	Certified units/sales
Canada (Music Canada)	4× Platinum	400,000^{^}
United States (RIAA)	Gold	500,000^{^}
^{^} Shipments figures based on certification alone.
