= Simple Mission =

Studio album by Glass Tiger
- Released: 1991
- Recorded: 1990
- Studios: A&M, Los Angeles, Sunset Sound Factory, Hollywood, and Distorto, Vancouver, British Columbia, Canada
- Genre: Pop
- Length: 53:59
- Label: Capitol
- Producer: Tom Werman

Glass Tiger chronology
Diamond Sun (1988)	Simple Mission (1991)	Air Time: The Best of Glass Tiger (1993)

Singles from Simple Mission
- 1. "Animal Heart" Released: 1991; 2. "Rhythm Of Your Love" Released: 1991; 3. "My Town" Released: August 1991; 4. "Rescued (By The Arms Of Love)" Released: 1991

Simple Mission is the third album by the Canadian band Glass Tiger, released in 1991.

The single "My Town" features Rod Stewart on lead vocals alongside Alan Frew, and reached No. 33 on the UK, marking the band's second highest position in that country. "Animal Heart" received a Juno Award nomination. The album was certified platinum in Canada.

== Production ==
The album was produced mostly by Tom Werman. Tony Thompson played drums on the majority of its tracks. The band attempted to incorporate rock styles alongside its pop.

== Critical reception ==
Professional ratings
Review scores
Source	Rating
Windsor Star	B

The Toronto Star wrote: "By the fourth or fifth listen, one senses the pure, unvarnished Glass Tiger, and that's a band still very much rooted in the ethos of mid-'70s arena-rock, a hybrid of your basic REO Speedwagon, Foreigner, Journey and Kansas." The Windsor Star noted that the album "has a raunchier, gutsier sound on most of the tunes, a conscious effort on their part to emphasize guitar rather than keyboards." The Edmonton Journal concluded that "every cut on this uneven effort is slathered with rackety electric guitar riffs and self-consciously aggressive vocals that ape everyone from Aerosmith's Steve Tyler to Corey Hart."

== Track listing ==
No.	Title	Writer(s)	Length
1.	"Blinded"	Connelly, Frew, Dvoskin	4:38
2.	"Animal Heart"	Connelly, Frew, Dvoskin	3:50
3.	"Let's Talk"	Frew, Reid, Vallance	4:23
4.	"Where Did Our Love Go"	Frew, Reid, Vallance	4:31
5.	"My Town"	Connelly, Frew, Parker, Cregan	4:49
6.	"The Rhythm of Your Love"	Connelly, Frew	4:38
7.	"Spanish Slumber"	Frew, Reid	1:29
8.	"Simple Mission"	Frew, Reid	4:34
9.	"Stand or Fall"	Frew, Reid, Vallance, Sandford	3:59
10.	"Rescued (By the Arms of Love)"	Frew, Parker, Washbrook	4:16
11.	"One to One"	Frew, Reid, Vallance	4:30
12.	"One Night Alone"	Frew, Reid, Vallance	4:06
13.	"(She Said) Love Me Like a Man"	Frew, Reid, Vallance	4:09

Produced by Tom Werman except:

- track 5, produced by Tom Werman and Jim Cregan
- track 7, produced by Sam Reid
- track 11, produced by Tom Werman and Jim Vallance

== Personnel ==
Glass Tiger

- Al Connelly – guitars
- Wayne Parker – electric bass
- Sam Reid – keyboards
- Alan Frew – vocals

Additional musicians

- Drums: Tony Thompson (except tracks 4 and 6)
- Drums: John Keane (tracks 4 and 6)
- Backing vocals: Tom Kelly, Tommy Funderburk, Rique Franks, Jeff Scott Soto, Mark Free, Paul Rafferty
- Spanish voice: Maria Del Rey
- Vocals on "My Town": Rod Stewart
- Acoustic guitar on "My Town": Jim Cregan
- Additional guitars: Tim Pierce
- Additional keyboards on "One to One": Jim Vallance
- Saxophone solo on "Where Did Our Love Go": Gary Herbig
- Extra percussion: Alex Acuña
- String Arrangement on "Where Did Our Love Go": James Newton Howard

Production

- Associate Producer: Sam Reid
- Engineering: Eddie DeLena
- Mixing: Eddie DeLena and David Thoener
- Assistance: Neal Avron, Ed Goodreau, Greg Goldman, and Efren Herrera
- Additional Engineering: Neal Avron
- Recording: Jim Vallance
- Mastering: Stephen Marcussen (Precision Lacquer, Los Angeles)

== Charts ==
Chart (1991)	Peak position
Canada Top Albums/CDs (RPM)	13
Swiss Albums (Schweizer Hitparade)	27

== Certifications ==
Region	Certification	Certified units/sales
Canada (Music Canada)	Platinum	100,000^{^}
^{^} Shipments figures based on certification alone.
