= Native place =

Concept of origin

Someone's native place is a concept of specific rural settlement origin particularly found in rapidly urbanizing societies. This in Asia and elsewhere may be linked to the rural home of grandparents and ancestors of first and second or third generation city-born descendants. In China this is known as jiāxiāng (zh:家乡), among other terms, and is legally entrenched in the hukou registration. In Korea this is known as kohyang (ko:고향) and related to nostalgia for rural life. This concept is distinct from notions of tribe, region or nation and is specifically anchored on specific settlements. Whereas European notions of sub-national homeland such as German heimat or Swedish hembygd may have a larger regional identity, and in literature this a trope in romanticism, in Asia the native place is highly localized. In India "native place" can refer to one's origin from very distant ancestors.
