= Music Express (magazine) =

Magazine

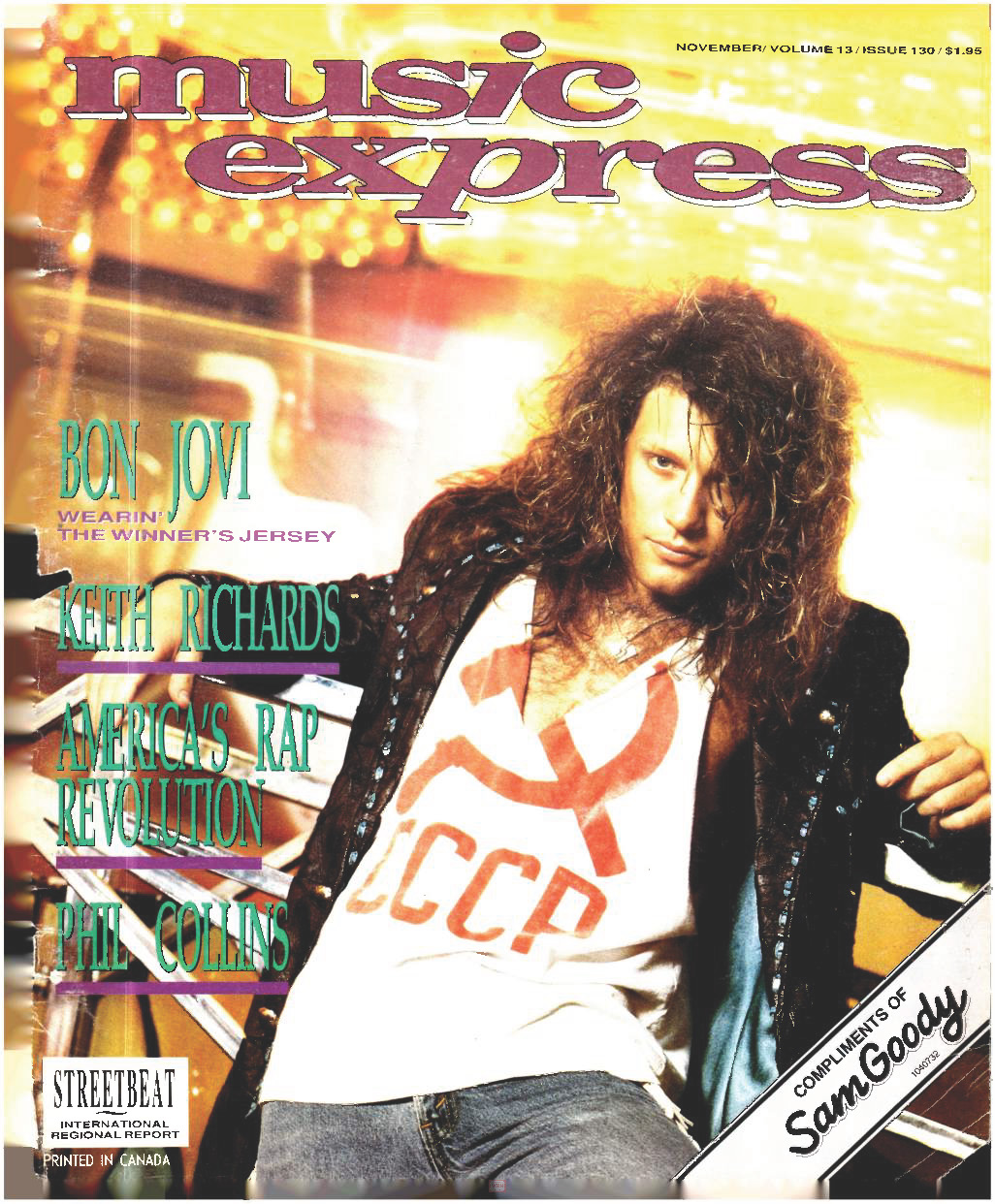
- Issue cover dated November 1988, featuring Jon Bon Jovi
- Editor: Various
- Categories: Music magazine
- Frequency: Monthly
- Publisher: Conny J. Kunz (1978-1990); Keith Sharp (1990-1992)
- First issue: October 1976
- Final issue Number: December 1996; Vol. 17, no. 178
- Company: Rock Express Communications
- Country: Canada
- Language: English
- Website: themusicexpress.ca
- ISSN: 0848-9645

Music Express (abbreviated ME on later covers) was a Canadian music magazine. Published as a print magazine from 1976 to 1996, it ceased operations that year but was relaunched as an online magazine in 2012 until publisher Keith Sharp's death in 2024.

== History ==
Music Express traces its roots to Calgary in October 1976, when 23‑year‑old Calgary Herald sportswriter Keith Sharp produced a one‑off tabloid called Alberta Music Express. Two years later he brought on the publisher Conny Kunz, and in February 1980 the pair moved the operation to Toronto, rebranding it simply Music Express and marketing it as "The Pulse of Canadian Music." The relocation, which placed the magazine closer to the country's record‑industry centre, quickly attracted stronger label advertising and news‑stand distribution, transforming the title into Canada's largest monthly consumer music magazine with an average print run of about 50 000 copies through the 1980s. Music Express primarily covered rock and pop music, with a focus on Canadian music.

The magazine's ambitions expanded beyond Canada in 1986, when Sharp negotiated a deal for Music Express to serve as the in‑house title for the 1 100‑store U.S. Musicland-Sam Goody chain. Circulation spiked, peaking at 1.2 million copies for the December 1987 issue featuring the singer Michael Jackson, a figure believed to be the highest single print run ever achieved by a Canadian music magazine.

The momentum faltered after the Musicland‑Sam Goody agreement ended in 1990. Alternative circulation efforts proved unsustainable, and new ownership took control in 1992, changing the magazine's name first to Soundcan and then Impact. Sharp was removed as editor‑in‑chief in early 1993, and although former staff continued Impact for three more years, the original Music Express era had effectively closed. Undeterred, Sharp launched the bi‑monthly lifestyle publication Access in 1994, maintaining national distribution until 2010. After Access folded, he revived the Music Express brand online, focusing on Canadian rock through a website and newsletter that operated until his death on 18 October 2024 at the age of 71.

== Legacy ==
Music Express filled a gap in Canada's media landscape at a time when few national music outlets existed besides the trade journal RPM and local weeklies. Its broad circulation provided a platform for Canadian talent seeking visibility both at home and in the United States, and it served as an early training ground for many journalists and photographers. Former Access editor Sean Plummer credited Sharp's "hustler" mentality for giving young journalists long, practical apprenticeships at a time when "magazines folded left and right," opportunities he says he "wouldn't have had otherwise." The journalist Larry LeBlanc noted that by bringing a national focus to Canadian music in the late‑1970s and 1980s, Music Express supplied coverage that "wasn't much there" before, reinforcing its role as a catalyst for domestic artists seeking national recognition.
