= Diamond Sun =

Studio album by Glass Tiger
- Released: April 13, 1988
- Recorded: 1987–1988
- Studios: Le Studio, Morin-Heights, Quebec, Canada, Distorto, Vancouver, British Columbia, Canada, Phase One, and Eastern Sound Toronto, Ontario, Canada, Windmill Lane, Dublin, Ireland
- Genre: Pop rock
- Length: 46:54
- Labels: Capitol (Canada); EMI Manhattan (USA)
- Producer: Jim Vallance

Glass Tiger chronology
The Thin Red Line (1986)	Diamond Sun (1988)	Simple Mission (1991)

Singles from Diamond Sun
- 1. "I'm Still Searching" Released: 1988; 2. "Diamond Sun" Released: 1988; 3. "My Song" Released: 1988; 4. "Send Your Love" Released: 1989; 5. "(Watching) Worlds Crumble" Released: 1989

Diamond Sun is the second album by Canadian band Glass Tiger. It was released by EMI Manhattan Records on April 13, 1988. The album was certified triple platinum in Canada and featured the single "I'm Still Searching", which peaked at No. 2 in Canada. The album was produced by Jim Vallance.

== Critical reception ==
Professional ratings
Review scores
Source	Rating
AllMusic	2.5/5 stars

Cashbox gave the album a highly positive forecast, predicting that both "AOR and Top 40 radio" would be "instantly receptive to the slickly produced Diamond Sun." The review also highlighted the inclusion of the "powerful" track "My Song," noting that it featured a guest appearance by Celtic group The Chieftains. The Globe and Mail deemed the album "melodic, vaguely anthemic pop-rock."

== Track listing ==
No.	Title	Writer(s)	Length
1.	"Diamond Sun"	Alan Frew; Jim Vallance	5:22
2.	"Far Away from Here"	Frew; Michael Hanson; Sam Reid	4:08
3.	"I'm Still Searching"	Frew; Hanson; Reid	3:58
4.	"A Lifetime of Moments"	Frew; Hanson	4:58
5.	"It's Love U Feel"	Frew; Reid; Vallance	5:32
6.	"My Song" (with the Chieftains)	Frew; Reid; Vallance	3:26
7.	"(Watching) Worlds Crumble"	Frew; Reid; Vallance	4:53
8.	"Send Your Love"	Frew; Hanson	4:28
9.	"Suffer in Silence"	Frew; Reid	3:35
10.	"This Island Earth"	Frew; Hanson; Reid	6:30
Total length:			46:54

== Personnel ==
Glass Tiger

- Alan Frew - vocals
- Sam Reid - keyboards
- Al Connelly - guitars
- Wayne Parker - electric bass
- Michael Hanson - drums, additional guitars

Additional musicians

- Backing vocals: Dalbello, Arnold Lanni, Sheree Jeacocke, Colina Phillips
- Additional guitars: Keith Scott
- Additional drums and keyboards: Jim Vallance
- Additional fretless bass: Rene Worst
- Saxophone: Earl Seymour
- Synclavier programming: John Grier

Production

- Recording: Jim Vallance, Randy Staub, Tom Henderson, and Brian Masterson
- Mixing: Ed Thacker
- Assistance: Randy Staub, Paul Milner, Glen Robinson, Darren Millar, Joe Mancuso, and Ciaran Byrne
- Producing on track 6: Sam Reid
- Mastering: Bob Ludwig at Masterdisk, NY
- Art direction, design, and sculpture: Heather Brown
- Photography: Douglas Brown
- Group photography: Alison Wardman

== Charts ==
Chart (1988)	Peak position
Canada Top Albums/CDs (RPM)	6
German Albums (Offizielle Top 100)	34
Swiss Albums (Schweizer Hitparade)	27
US Billboard 200	82

== Certifications ==
Region	Certification	Certified units/sales
Canada (Music Canada)	3× Platinum	300,000^{^}
^{^} Shipments figures based on certification alone.
