= Glass Tiger =

Canadian rock band

- Glass Tiger performing in 2026

Background information
- Also known as: Tokyo (1981–1983)
- Origin: Newmarket, Ontario, Canada
- Genres: Pop rock; soft rock; synth-rock
- Years active: 1981–1993; 2003–present
- Labels: EMI Manhattan (USA); Capitol; Warner Canada
- Members: Al Connelly; Alan Frew; Wayne Parker; Sam Reid; Chris McNeill
- Past members: Michael Hanson
- Website: www.glasstiger.ca

Glass Tiger is a Canadian rock band from Newmarket, Ontario that formed in 1981. The band has released five studio albums. Its 1986 debut album, The Thin Red Line, went quadruple platinum in Canada and gold in the United States. Two singles from that album, "Don't Forget Me (When I'm Gone)" and "Someday", reached the U.S. Top 10. Glass Tiger has won five Juno Awards and was nominated for the Grammy Award for Best New Artist in 1987. In 2025, the band was inducted into the Canadian Music Hall of Fame.

== History ==
In Newmarket, Ontario, a band called Tokyo formed in 1981. The band's members were vocalist Alan Frew and bassist Wayne Parker (both from local band Onyx), along with keyboardist Sam Reid (from River Drive Park band The End) and drummer Michael Hanson. Guitarist Al Connelly joined the band in 1983. The band later changed its name to Glass Tiger.

In 1986, Glass Tiger released its first album, The Thin Red Line; it was produced by Jim Vallance (who co-wrote two songs) and Bryan Adams made a memorable vocal cameo on the lead single "Don't Forget Me (When I'm Gone)". This album went quadruple platinum in Canada and gold in the United States. Two of its songs, "Don't Forget Me (When I'm Gone)" and "Someday", reached the Top 10 in the U.S. charts. Glass Tiger won three 1986 Juno Awards: Album of the Year for The Thin Red Line, Single of the Year for "Don't Forget Me (When I'm Gone)", and Most Promising Group of the Year. The album's producer, Jim Vallance, was named Composer of the Year. The band won two more Juno Awards in 1987 and was nominated for a Grammy Award for Best New Artist. The band performed in the United States as part of Journey’s Raised on Radio Tour and on Tina Turner's European Break Every Rule Tour. On June 3, 1989, the band performed at the opening celebration of the Skydome.

The band released a second album, Diamond Sun, in 1988. The album was certified triple platinum in Canada and featured the single "I'm Still Searching", which peaked at #2 in Canada. Hanson left the band in 1988 following the release of Diamond Sun.

Glass Tiger's third album, Simple Mission, was released in 1991 by Capitol Records. The album received radio play in Canada and Europe. It was certified platinum in Canada.

The band went on hiatus in 1993. After pursuing other projects, the band reformed in 2003 with new drummer Chris McNeil and began touring again.

In March 2009, Glass Tiger and members of the NHL alumni visited Canadian Forces stationed in Kandahar, Afghanistan. The visit included live performances, and footage was shown on an episode of Entertainment Tonight Canada. The band returned to Afghanistan for a second performance in 2010.

In 2012, Glass Tiger toured across Canada with the band Roxette, and performed as part of Penticton, British Columbia's "Rock The Peach Music Fest" On July 1, 2013, Glass Tiger performed a free concert in Leduc, Alberta, as part of a Canada Day Celebration. Glass Tiger performed at a number of festivals in the summer of 2017. On September 23, 2017, Glass Tiger performed at Canada Games Plaza in Prince George, British Columbia. The free concert was held to thank the city for receiving over 11,000 evacuees from the southern interior who had been displaced by various wildfires.

In February 2018, to celebrate 31 years of making music together, the band released an album entitled 31. Produced by Scottish/Canadian country artist Johnny Reid, the album includes special guest contributions from Julian Lennon ("Thin Red Line"), Alan Doyle ("My Song"), Véronic DiCaire ("Someday") and Susan Aglukark and David R. Maracle ("Diamond Sun").

In May 2019, Glass Tiger released their fifth studio album, 33. Following the release of 33, the band joined Corey Hart on his Never Surrender cross-Canada tour in June 2019. The band continued to perform a number of headlining shows throughout the summer and performed as part of the Sopot International Song Festival in Poland.

On May 15, 2025, Glass Tiger was inducted into the Canadian Music Hall of Fame.

== Band members ==
Current

- Al Connelly – guitar, backing vocals (1981–1993, 2003–present)
- Alan Frew – vocals, guitar, tambourine (1983–present)
- Wayne Parker – bass, backing vocals (1981–1993, 2003–present)
- Sam Reid – keyboards, piano, backing vocals (1981–1993, 2003–present)
- Chris McNeill – drums (2003–present)

Former

- Michael Hanson – drums, guitar, backing vocals (1981–1988)

== Discography ==
=== Studio albums ===
Title	Album details	Peak chart positions			Certifications (sales thresholds)
Title	Album details	CAN	AUS	US	Certifications (sales thresholds)
The Thin Red Line	Release date: February 17, 1986; Label: Capitol; Formats: CD, cassette	3	77	27	RIAA: Gold; MC: 4× Platinum
Diamond Sun	Release date: 13 April 1988; Label: EMI Manhattan; Formats: CD, cassette	6	—	82	MC: 3× Platinum
Simple Mission	Release date: 22 March 1991; Label: Capitol; Formats: CD, cassette	11	—	—	MC: Platinum
31	Release date: 16 February 2018; Label: Halo Entertainment Group; Formats: CD	—	—	—	
33	Release date: 17 May 2019; Label: Willow Music; Formats: CD - EP on Vinyl	—	—	—	
Songs for a Winter's Night	Release date: 30 October 2020; Label: Willow Music; Formats: CD - Vinyl	—	—	—	
"—" denotes releases that did not chart.

=== Live albums ===
- Live (2006)

=== Compilation albums ===
- Air Time: The Best of Glass Tiger (1993)
- No Turning Back: 1985–2005 (2005)
- Then, Now, Next (2012)

=== Singles ===
Title	Release	Peak chart positions					Certifications (sales threshold)	Album
Title	Release	CAN	US	US Rock	UK	AUS	Certifications (sales threshold)	Album
"Don't Forget Me (When I'm Gone)"	1986	1	2	17	29	9	MC: Platinum	The Thin Red Line
"Thin Red Line"	1986	19	—	—	—	91		The Thin Red Line
"Someday"	1986	14	7	—	66	97	MC: Gold	The Thin Red Line
"You're What I Look For"	1987	11	—	—	—	—		The Thin Red Line
"I Will Be There"	1987	29	34	21	—	—		The Thin Red Line
"I'm Still Searching"	1988	2	31	12	—	—		Diamond Sun
"Diamond Sun"	1988	5	—	—	78	—		Diamond Sun
"My Song" (featuring The Chieftains)	1988	19	—	—	—	—		Diamond Sun
"Far Away From Here"	1988	—	—	—	—	—		Diamond Sun
"Send Your Love"	1988	—	—	—	—	—		Diamond Sun
"(Watching) Worlds Crumble"	1989	27	—	—	—	—		Diamond Sun
"Blinded"	1991	—	—	—	—	—		Simple Mission
"Animal Heart"	1991	4	—	—	—	—		Simple Mission
"Rhythm of Your Love"	1991	8	—	—	—	—		Simple Mission
"My Town" (featuring Rod Stewart)	1991	8	—	—	33	—		Simple Mission
"Rescued (By the Arms of Love)"	1991	8	—	—	—	—		Simple Mission
"Touch of Your Hand"	1993	34	—	—	—	—		Air Time: The Best of Glass Tiger
"—" denotes a recording that did not chart or was not released in that territory.

NB: "My Song" (1988) missed the Billboard Hot 100, but peaked at number 71 on the Cash Box Top 100 Singles chart.

NB: "Don't Forget Me" and "Someday" both reached the Billboard AC chart, peaking at #30 and #4 respectively.

== Awards and nominations ==
Award	Year (Note: Indicates the year of ceremony. Each year is linked to the article about the awards held that year, wherever possible.)	Recipient(s) and nominee(s)	Category	Result	Ref.
Juno Awards	1986	The Thin Red Line	Album of the Year	Won	
Juno Awards	1986	Glass Tiger	Most Promising Group of the Year	Won	
Juno Awards	1986	"Don't Forget Me (When I'm Gone)"	Best Selling Single	Won	
Juno Awards	1986	"Don't Forget Me (When I'm Gone)"	Best Video	Nominated	
Grammy Award	1987	Glass Tiger	Best New Artist	Nominated	
Juno Awards	1987	"Someday"	Single of the Year	Won	
Juno Awards	1987	Glass Tiger	Canadian Entertainer of the Year	Nominated	
Juno Awards	1989	Glass Tiger	Canadian Entertainer of the Year	Won	
Juno Awards	1989	Glass Tiger	Best Group	Nominated	
Juno Awards	1989	"Diamond Sun"	Single of the Year	Nominated	
Juno Awards	1989	Diamond Sun	Album of the Year	Nominated	
Juno Awards	1992	"Animal Heart"	Single of the Year	Nominated	
Juno Awards	1992	Glass Tiger	Group of the Year	Nominated	
