= Alan Frew =

- Alan Frew, 2011.

Background information
- Born: 8 November 1956 (age 69); Coatbridge, Scotland
- Origin: Newmarket, Ontario, Canada
- Genres: Rock; alternative rock
- Occupations: Singer, musician, author, public speaker
- Instruments: Vocals; guitar
- Years active: 1983–present
- Label: Capitol
- Website: alanfrewworld.com

Alan Graham Frew (born November 8, 1956) is a Scottish-Canadian singer, songwriter, actor, and author, who is the lead singer of the Canadian rock band Glass Tiger. He has also released three solo albums.

== Early life ==
Born 8 November 1956, in Coatbridge, Scotland, Frew moved to Newmarket, Ontario, at age 16 with his family.

== Musical career ==
In 1983, Frew and others formed Glass Tiger. In 1986, the band released its first album, The Thin Red Line. Two of its songs, "Don't Forget Me (When I'm Gone)" and "Someday", reached the Top 10 in the U.S. charts. The Thin Red Line went quadruple platinum in Canada and gold in the United States. Glass Tiger was nominated for a Grammy Award for Best New Artist in 1987 and has won five Canadian Juno Awards.

Frew and Stephan Moccio co-wrote "I Believe", which "became the theme song for Canada's Olympic Broadcast Consortium for the 2010 Winter Games in Vancouver" and "Free to Be", which is used by the Toronto Maple Leafs as their theme song.

Frew portrayed the character Ewan McCauley in the 2010 Canadian comedy film GravyTrain.

In 2025, amid the controversy around Donald Trump's trade war against Canada, Frew released the solo single "Canada's Song (Free to Be Strong and Free)". He performed the song at concerts on Glass Tiger's This Island Earth tour, and on the This Hour Has 22 Minutes election special.

== Personal life ==
On 20 August 2015, Frew suffered a stroke causing trauma to his right side. As of January 2018, Frew had made a full recovery.

== Awards and recognition ==
Frew has received the Queen's Diamond Jubilee Medal "in recognition of his service to the Canadian arts, and for his dedication to helping poverty-stricken children". With co-writer Sharon Brennan, Frew wrote The Action Sandwich: A Six Step Recipe to Success by Doing What You're Already Doing (ISBN 978-0-9736863-9-5), a 2007 autobiography.

== Discography ==
=== Solo albums ===
- Hold On (1994)
- Wonderland (2000)
- 80290 Rewind (2015)

=== with Glass Tiger ===
- The Thin Red Line (1986)
- Diamond Sun (1988)
- Simple Mission (1991)
- 31 (2018)
- 33 (2019)

=== Solo singles ===
- "Healing Hands" (1994) [#8 CAN]
- "So Blind" (1995)
- "Canada's Song (Free to Be Strong and Free)" (2025)
