= Sam Reid (musician) =

Canadian keyboardist

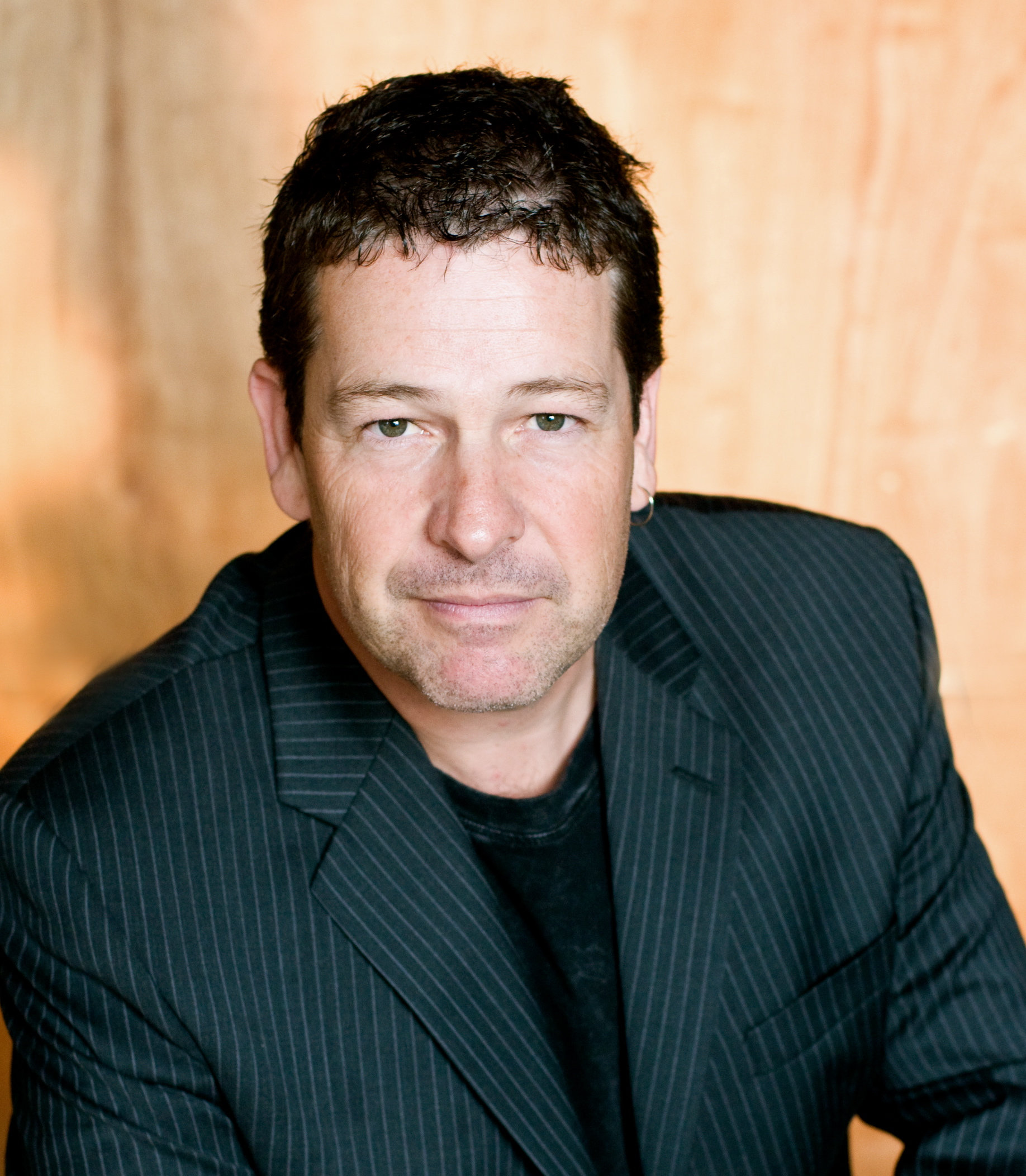
- Reid in 2008

Background information
- Born: 1 December 1963 (age 62); Brampton, Ontario, Canada
- Genre: Rock
- Occupations: Keyboardist, songwriter, musician. producer
- Years active: 1983–present
- Member of: Glass Tiger
- Website: www.samreid.ca

Samuel Reid (born 1 December 1963) is the founding keyboardist with the Canadian rock band, Glass Tiger. He and his band were honoured with five Canadian Music Industry Juno Awards, multiple Canadian SOCAN Classic Awards and were nominated for a Best New Artist Grammy Award.

== Career achievements ==
Juno Awards

- 1989 Glass Tiger Canadian Entertainer of the Year
- 1987 Glass Tiger Single of the Year – "Someday"
- 1986 Glass Tiger Album of the Year-The Thin Red Line
- 1986 Glass Tiger Single of the Year – "Don't Forget Me"
- 1986 Glass Tiger Most Promising Group of the Year
- 1986 Glass Tiger American Grammy Nomination – Best New Artist

Gold & Platinum Records
-Nearly every Glass Tiger record went Gold or Platinum

== Discography ==
=== with Glass Tiger ===
- The Thin Red Line (1986)
- Diamond Sun (1988)
- Simple Mission (1991)
- 31 (2018)

=== with Rik Emmett ===
- The Spirit of Christmas (1999)
