= Don't Forget Me (When I'm Gone) =

1986 single by Glass Tiger

Single by Glass Tiger

from the album The Thin Red Line
- B-side: "Ancient Evenings"
- Released: 1986
- Genre: Pop rock
- Length: 4:05
- Label: Capitol
- Songwriters: Alan Frew; Sam Reid; Jim Vallance
- Producer: Jim Vallance

Glass Tiger singles chronology
"Don't Forget Me (When I'm Gone)" (1986)	"Thin Red Line" (1986)

Music video
- "Don't Forget Me (When I'm Gone)" (international) by Glass Tiger on YouTube
- "Don't Forget Me (When I'm Gone)" (Canadian) by Glass Tiger on YouTube

"Don't Forget Me (When I'm Gone)" is a song by Canadian rock band Glass Tiger. It was released in 1986 as the lead from their debut album, The Thin Red Line (1986). The song reached number one in Canada and number two in the United States. The song features backing vocals by fellow Canadian rock singer Bryan Adams.

== Background ==
In 1985, Glass Tiger chose Jim Vallance to produce the band's debut album. At the time, Vallance was primarily known as a songwriter, having written most frequently (and successfully) with Bryan Adams (who can be heard providing background vocals towards the end of this song). He also had some previous production experience, having produced one album apiece for Adams, Doug and the Slugs and CANO in the early 1980s. The band's lead vocalist Alan Frew recalled: "It worked out great because we were all at the same stage of development. He didn't change the sound of the band at all. He let us experiment but wasn't afraid to get heavy-handed when he had to." Vallance composed "Don't Forget Me (When I'm Gone)" with the band, while Adams provided backing vocals. Frew - "On the very first day that we met Jim Vallance, he picked us up at the airport and to break the ice asked us what we were listening to. One was Tears for Fears. We went to his house and drank tea and listened to some tunes. 'Everybody Wants to Rule the World' came on and we really liked the shuffle beat. So we went into the studio and based on this shuffle beat, we wrote 'Don't Forget Me (When I'm Gone)'. First day, first song."

== Composition ==
The track runs at 110 BPM and is in the key of A major. It runs at four minutes and eight seconds in the album version. Frew's vocals span from E_{3} to G_{4}.

== Release and reception ==
"Don't Forget Me (When I'm Gone)" topped the Canadian RPM Top 100 in March 1986, and spent two weeks at number 1. The single was certified platinum by the Canadian Recording Industry Association in July. The song reached number 2 on the Billboard Hot 100, number 1 on the Singles Sales chart and number 6 on the Hot 100 Airplay chart. The song also peaked at number 3 on the Cash Box Top 100 chart, 17 on the Mainstream Rock chart, number 30 on the Adult Contemporary chart. At the end of 1986, the song placed at number 34 on Billboard and number 50 on the Cash Box year end singles chart. The single reached the top 10 in Australia, number 27 in New Zealand, number 29 in the United Kingdom, and number 40 in the Netherlands.

Frew credited the song's chart performance to "solid record company involvement" and the band's international appeal. "We aren't rewriting musical history by any means," he added. "But our melody lines are strong and mature enough to appeal to the English-speaking world." The song won the 1986 Juno Award for Single of the Year, and was named top Canadian single in the Rock Express magazine readers' poll awards in 1987. In 1996, the Society of Composers, Authors and Music Publishers of Canada honored the song for airing more than 100,000 times on Canadian radio.

== Music videos ==
The song's original music video, made for the Canadian market, mixed performance footage with a storybook concept. Directed by Rob Quartly, the video was nominated for Best Video at the Juno Awards of 1986. This version was the first video to air on the MuchMoreRetro digital cable music video channel when it launched on September 4, 2003. A second video was created for other markets, according to Manhattan Records Vice President of A&R Bruce Garfield. He noted that "Steven Reed, our senior vice president of marketing, took a very strong stand because the Canadian video was too cutesy and directed solely toward the youth market." Garfield added, "It didn't focus enough on the artistic integrity and entertainment aspect of the band." The newer version, which has a concert setting, received heavy rotation on MTV.

== Legacy ==
Glass Tiger performed the song during an episode of the 2005 NBC reality television program Hit Me, Baby, One More Time.

On June 9, 2023, the band appeared on the final episode of the long-running The Marilyn Denis Show, performing "Don't Forget Me (When I'm Gone)" with some lyric alterations to reflect that the viewing audience would not forget retiring host Marilyn Denis.

== Track listings ==
7-inch vinyl (Canada, Australia, Europe, U.S.)

1. "Don't Forget Me (When I'm Gone)" – 4:05
2. "Ancient Evenings" – 4:50

12-inch vinyl (Canada)

1. "Don't Forget Me (When I'm Gone)" (extended version) – 7:10
2. "Don't Forget Me (When I'm Gone)" (single mix) – 4:05
3. "Do You Wanna Dance (With Me)" – 3:58

== Charts ==
=== Weekly charts ===
Chart (1986)	Peak position
Australia (Kent Music Report)	9
Canada Retail Singles (The Record)	1
Canada Top Singles (RPM)	1
Ireland (IRMA)	26
Luxembourg (Radio Luxembourg)	22
Netherlands (Dutch Top 40)	40
Netherlands (Single Top 100)	40
New Zealand (Recorded Music NZ)	27
South Africa (Springbok Radio)	8
UK Singles (OCC)	29
US Billboard Hot 100	2
US Adult Contemporary (Billboard)	30
US Album Rock Tracks (Billboard)	17
West Germany (GfK)	32

=== Year-end charts ===
Chart (1986)	Rank
Canada Top Singles (RPM)	4
US Billboard Hot 100	34

Chart (1987)	Rank
Australia (Kent Music Report)	76

== Certifications ==
Region	Certification	Certified units/sales
Canada (Music Canada)	Platinum	100,000^{^}
^{^} Shipments figures based on certification alone.
